= Congratulations: 50 Years of the Eurovision Song Contest =

Television programme

Date and venue
- Air date: 22 October 2005
- Venue: Forum Copenhagen; Copenhagen, Denmark

Organisation
- Organiser: European Broadcasting Union (EBU)
- Executive supervisor: Svante Stockselius (EBU); Kjell Ekkolm (EBU); Søren Therkelsen (DR); Anders Kierulf (DR)

Production
- Host broadcaster: Danish Broadcasting Corporation (DR)
- Director: Lars Hammer
- Executive producer: Jan Frifelt
- Musical director: Michael Bojesen
- Presenters: Katrina Leskanich; Renārs Kaupers

Vote
- Voting system: Each country awarded 1–8, 10, and 12 points to ten songs; the five songs with the most points progressed to a second round of voting, where each country awarded 6–8, 10, and 12 points.
- Winning song: "Waterloo" by ABBA

Congratulations: 50 Years of the Eurovision Song Contest was a television programme organised by the European Broadcasting Union (EBU) to commemorate the Eurovision Song Contest's fiftieth anniversary and to determine the contest's most popular entrant of its fifty years. Hosted by Katrina Leskanich and Renārs Kaupers, the event took place at Forum, in Copenhagen, Denmark, on 22 October 2005. The host broadcaster was the Danish Broadcasting Corporation (DR). Fourteen songs from the contest's first half-century, chosen through an internet poll and by a jury, contested the event.

Thirty-one EBU-member countries broadcast the concert (although notably France, Italy, and the United Kingdom did not) and televoting and juries in these countries decided the winner. A total of 2.5 million votes were cast during the live broadcast. The event was won by the song "Waterloo" by group ABBA, who did not attend; the act had originally won the contest for Sweden in 1974.

To coincide with the event, the EBU released two double album CDs featuring Eurovision songs from the previous fifty years. Two DVDs with original Eurovision performances of these songs were also released.

== Organisation ==
In November 2002, Jürgen Meier-Beer from the Reference Group of the European Broadcasting Union (EBU) announced plans to organize a special jubilee programme in 2005 to celebrate the 50th anniversary of the Eurovision Song Contest. At the time no host broadcaster was announced, with German broadcaster Norddeutscher Rundfunk (NDR) and the Dutch broadcasting organization Nederlandse Omroep Stichting (NOS) reportedly as potential hosts.

=== Change of host broadcaster ===
In June 2004, the EBU announced that it was to hold a concert to celebrate fifty years of the contest. The event was to be held on 16 October 2005 at the Royal Albert Hall in London, United Kingdom. The British Broadcasting Corporation (BBC) was to be the host broadcaster for the concert. The Royal Albert Hall was reportedly unavailable, so in August 2004 the EBU announced that Denmark's DR would stage the event instead. Eurovision Song Contest supervisor Svante Stockselius said that their previous experience of hosting Eurovision events (the 2001 contest and the first Junior Eurovision in 2003) were influential in the EBU's choice. The event was codenamed Extravaganza.

1998 Eurovision winner Dana International, who appeared at the event, later went to suggest that the reason behind the change of host broadcaster was also due to the fact that the BBC wanted to present the show "with humour" as though to poke fun at the contest, an idea that proved to be less popular with the EBU. The BBC ended up not broadcasting the show from Copenhagen, and went on to broadcast their own 50th anniversary programme, Boom Bang-a-Bang: 50 Years of Eurovision, in May 2006. The programme featured archive footage and highlights of past contests, along with a performance of that year's UK entry by Daz Sampson and was hosted by Terry Wogan.

=== Selection of venue and hosts ===
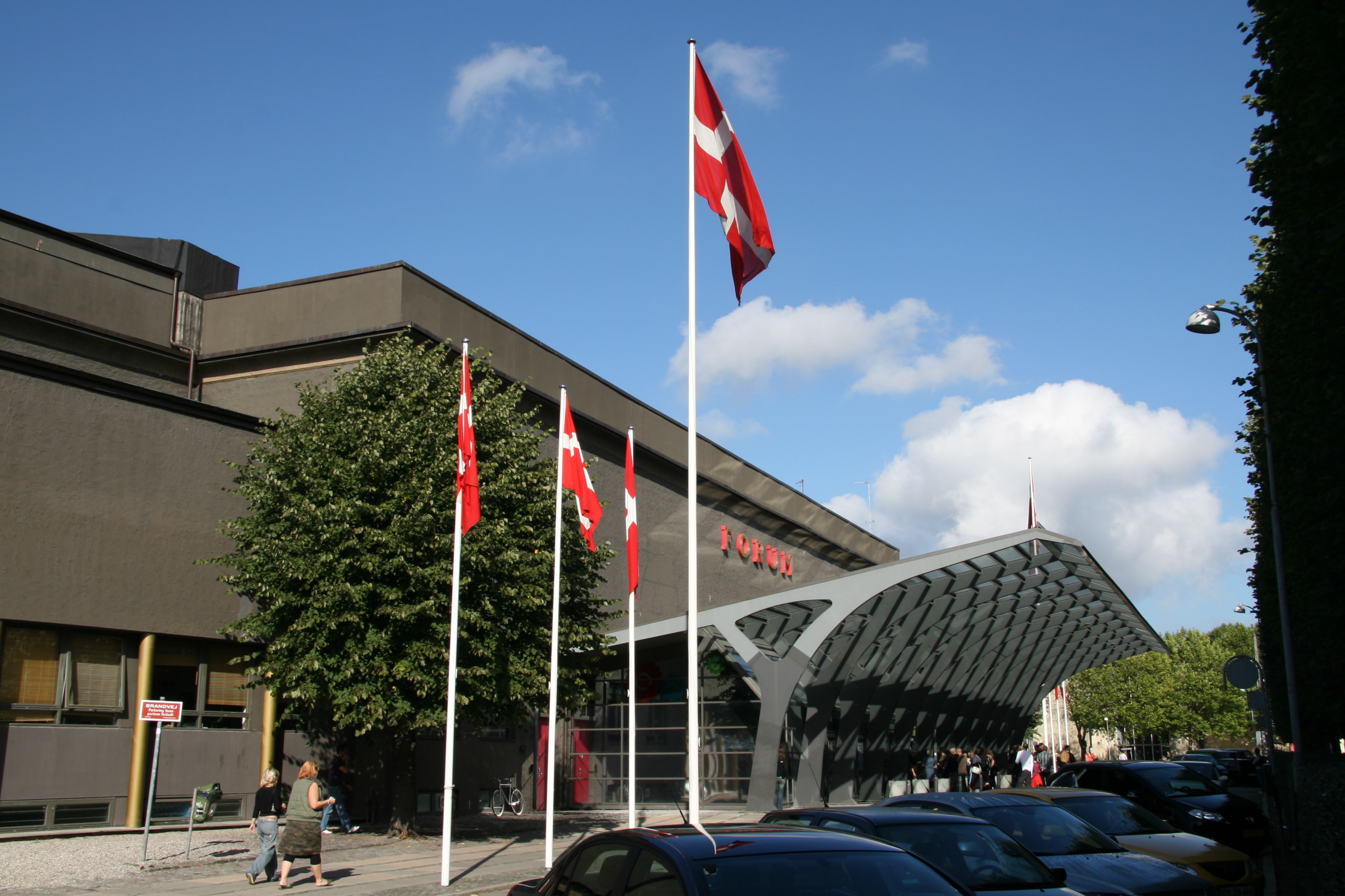
Forum Copenhagen, venue for the concert

On 25 October 2004, Copenhagen was confirmed as the host city for the event, which was now scheduled to take place on 22 October 2005. In May 2005 Congratulations was confirmed as the official name of the concert. A month later DR announced that Forum Copenhagen would host the programme. The chosen venue had previously hosted the first edition of the Junior Eurovision Song Contest.

On 9 September 2005, DR announced that Katrina Leskanich and Renārs Kaupers would present the concert. Leskanich was the lead singer of Katrina and The Waves, who won the contest for the United Kingdom in 1997. Kaupers is the lead singer of Latvian group Brainstorm, who represented Latvia in 2000 as the country's debut in the contest. Tickets for the event went on sale on 22 August 2005 from 10:00 (CET) and sold out in just over one hour. The event was attended by an audience of 6,000.

== Participating songs ==
Fourteen songs competed in Congratulations. In May 2005, the EBU opened a poll on its website to decide ten songs that would contest the event. Voters chose their two favourite songs from each of five decades: 1956 to 1965, 1966 to 1975, 1976 to 1985, 1986 to 1995 and 1996 to 2005. The remaining four songs would be selected by the EBU's Reference Group.

On 16 June 2005 the fourteen chosen songs were announced, although no indication was given as to which had been chosen online and which by the Reference Group. Eleven of the fourteen songs were Eurovision winners; only "Nel blu, dipinto di blu", "Congratulations" and "Eres tú" (which all finished in the top three at the contest) were not. Two countries, the United Kingdom and Ireland, were represented twice on the list. Johnny Logan, who won the contest twice for Ireland as a singer, had both of his songs featured on the list.

=== First round ===
All 31 countries broadcasting the contest voted in the first round. The five songs that are marked in orange qualified to the second and final round.

R/O	Year	Country	Artist	Song	Language	Place	Points
1	1968	United Kingdom	Cliff Richard	"Congratulations"	English	8	105
2	1980	Ireland	Johnny Logan	"What's Another Year"	English	12	74
3	1998	Israel	Dana International	"Diva"	Hebrew	13	39
4	1973	Spain	Mocedades	"Eres tú"	Spanish	11	90
5	1982	Germany	Nicole	"Ein bißchen Frieden"	German	7	106
6	1958	Italy	Domenico Modugno	"Nel blu, dipinto di blu"	Italian	2	200
7	1974	Sweden	ABBA	"Waterloo"	English	1	331
8	2000	Denmark	Olsen Brothers	"Fly on the Wings of Love"	English	6	111
9	1965	Luxembourg	France Gall	"Poupée de cire, poupée de son"	French	14	37
10	2003	Turkey	Sertab Erener	"Everyway That I Can"	English	9	104
11	1988	Switzerland	Celine Dion	"Ne partez pas sans moi"	French	10	98
12	1987	Ireland	Johnny Logan	"Hold Me Now"	English	3	182
13	1976	United Kingdom	Brotherhood of Man	"Save Your Kisses for Me"	English	5	154
14	2005	Greece	Helena Paparizou	"My Number One"	English	4	167

=== Second round ===
All 31 countries broadcasting the contest voted in the second round.

R/O	Year	Country	Artist	Song	Language	Place	Points
1	1958	Italy	Domenico Modugno	"Nel blu, dipinto di blu"	Italian	2	267
2	1974	Sweden	ABBA	"Waterloo"	English	1	329
3	1987	Ireland	Johnny Logan	"Hold Me Now"	English	3	262
4	1976	United Kingdom	Brotherhood of Man	"Save Your Kisses for Me"	English	5	230
5	2005	Greece	Helena Paparizou	"My Number One"	English	4	245

== Scoreboard ==
Both juries and televoting were used at Congratulations; both having an equal influence over the vote. In the first round of voting, the number of songs was reduced to five. Each country awarded points from one to eight, then ten and finally twelve for their ten most popular songs. Unlike in the Contest proper, viewers were allowed to vote for songs which had represented their country. The top five songs were then subjected to another round of voting, where only six points and above were awarded. The voting was conducted in private, and the results were not announced until after the show. The song with the most points in the second round was the winner.

The full scoreboard is as follows:

=== First round ===
Voting results in the first round
		Total score	Andorra	Austria	Belgium	Bosnia and Herzegovina	Croatia	Cyprus	Denmark	Finland	Germany	Greece	Iceland	Ireland	Israel	Latvia	Lithuania	Macedonia	Malta	Monaco	Netherlands	Norway	Poland	Portugal	Romania	Russia	Serbia and Montenegro	Slovenia	Spain	Sweden	Switzerland	Turkey	Ukraine
Songs	"Congratulations"	105	8	10		1	5	8	6	1	2	3	5	5		5			10		3	4	7	2	4		1	1	2	7			5
Songs	"What's Another Year"	74	2		4			6	5	4	1	6		8			3	3	2	3	6	6		4	6						1	4	
Songs	"Diva"	39			3			1		3					12	2	2			1						6	2		3				4
Songs	"Eres tú"	90	10		10	5			3	10	4				10			1			12			6				3	12			1	3
Songs	"Ein bißchen Frieden"	106	1	3		2	3	3	4	5	3		8	6	2	7	7		1		4	5	5	7	3	1	3	8	4	4	4	3	
Songs	"Nel blu, dipinto di blu"	200	6	7	6	7	10	5		8	7	8	7	2	4	6	8	7	6	8		2	6	8	7	10	8	10	8	5	8	10	6
Songs	"Waterloo"	331	12	12	12	8	12	10	12	12	12	7	10	10	8	12	12	8	8	12	10	12	12	12	8	12	12	12	10	12	10	8	12
Songs	"Fly on the Wings of Love"	111	3	5	1		6		10		6		12	7		10	10	2	7	2		8	3		1	3		4		8	3		
Songs	"Poupée de cire, poupée de son"	37		8	8		1			2		1			3					7			1			2			1	1			2
Songs	"Everyway That I Can"	104			2	10		2		6	8	4	4	3	7	1	1	4			8				5	5	5	2	5	3	7	12	
Songs	"Ne partez pas sans moi"	98	7	1		3	2		1			5	1	1	1	4		10	3	10	2	1	8	3		4	4			2	12	5	8
Songs	"Hold Me Now"	182		4	5	6	8	7	7	7	10	10	2	12	5		4	12	12	5	7	10	2	5	10		10	7		6	6	2	1
Songs	"Save Your Kisses for Me"	154	4	6		4	7	4	8			2	3		6	8	6	6	5	6	5	7	10	10	2	8	6	6	6		2	7	10
Songs	"My Number One"	167	5	2	7	12	4	12	2		5	12	6	4		3	5	5	4	4	1	3	4	1	12	7	7	5	7	10	5	6	7

==== 12 points ====
Below is a summary of the maximum 12 points each country awarded in the first round:

N.	Contestant	Nation(s) giving 12 points
18	"Waterloo"	Andorra, Austria, Belgium, Croatia, Denmark, Finland, Germany, Latvia, Lithuania, Monaco, Norway, Poland, Portugal, Russia, Serbia and Montenegro, Slovenia, Sweden, Ukraine
4	"My Number One"	Bosnia and Herzegovina, Cyprus, Greece, Romania
3	"Hold Me Now"	Ireland, Macedonia, Malta
2	"Eres tú"	Netherlands, Spain
1	"Fly on the Wings of Love"	Iceland
1	"Everyway That I Can"	Turkey
1	"Ne partez pas sans moi"	Switzerland
1	"Diva"	Israel

=== Second round ===
Voting results in the second round
		Total score	Andorra	Austria	Belgium	Bosnia and Herzegovina	Croatia	Cyprus	Denmark	Finland	Germany	Greece	Iceland	Ireland	Israel	Latvia	Lithuania	Macedonia	Malta	Monaco	Netherlands	Norway	Poland	Portugal	Romania	Russia	Serbia and Montenegro	Slovenia	Spain	Sweden	Switzerland	Turkey	Ukraine
Songs	"Nel blu, dipinto di blu"	267	10	10	8	10	8	7	6	10	12	8	10	7	7	8	12	8	8	10	6	6	8	8	7	10	7	10	10	7	10	12	7
Songs	"Waterloo"	329	12	12	12	8	10	10	12	12	7	7	12	10	10	12	10	10	10	12	12	12	12	7	8	12	10	12	12	12	12	8	12
Songs	"Hold Me Now"	262	6	7	10	7	12	8	10	8	8	10	8	12	8	6	6	12	12	7	10	10	6	12	12	6	8	8	6	8	7	6	6
Songs	"Save Your Kisses for Me"	230	7	8	6	6	6	6	8	7	6	6	7	6	12	10	8	7	6	8	8	8	10	10	6	8	6	7	8	6	6	7	10
Songs	"My Number One"	245	8	6	7	12	7	12	7	6	10	12	6	8	6	7	7	6	7	6	7	7	7	6	10	7	12	6	7	10	8	10	8

==== 12 points ====
Below is a summary of the maximum 12 points each country awarded in the second round:

N.	Contestant	Nation(s) giving 12 points
17	"Waterloo"	Andorra, Austria, Belgium, Denmark, Finland, Iceland, Latvia, Monaco, Netherlands, Norway, Poland, Russia, Slovenia, Spain, Sweden, Switzerland, Ukraine
6	"Hold Me Now"	Croatia, Ireland, Macedonia, Malta, Portugal, Romania
4	"My Number One"	Bosnia and Herzegovina, Cyprus, Greece, Serbia and Montenegro
3	"Nel blu, dipinto di blu"	Germany, Lithuania, Turkey
1	"Save Your Kisses for Me"	Israel

== Performances ==
The show started with the traditional Eurovision "Te Deum" theme followed by a message from Cliff Richard. After a quick montage of all 14 songs, the orchestra began playing "Ding-a-Dong" (Netherlands 1975), with dancers on stage. "A-Ba-Ni-Bi" (Israel 1978), "Le dernier qui a parlé..." (France 1991), and "Dschinghis Khan" (Germany 1979) was also played and accompanied by choreography, which was then followed by "Love Shine a Light" (United Kingdom 1997) sung by the co-host, Katrina Leskanich, who came out with flag holders of all the countries that have participated in Eurovision up to that point.

Throughout the telecast, a number of highlights segments were presented which showed montages of various Eurovision performances which were either interesting, notable or unorthodox. There were six assortments, which were under the categories described by the hosts as 'past winners', 'political, daring, larger than life', 'cute men', 'unforgettable interpretation of dance', 'girlpower' and 'close/narrow second-place finishers'. A number of former Eurovision artists returned to help introduce and present the show, including Carola Häggkvist, Massiel, Dana International, Birthe Wilke, Anne-Marie David, Sandra Kim, Elisabeth Andreassen, Hanne Krogh, Olsen Brothers, Emilija Kokić, Marie Myriam, Sertab Erener, Helena Paparizou, Nicole and Hugo, Cheryl Baker, and Lys Assia. Cliff Richard and Nicole gave pre-recorded messages as they were unable to attend.

During the show, there were many presentations by various guest artists during the voting and tallying period. These consisted of the Finnish shouting choir Mieskuoro Huutajat, Riverdance (the 1994 interval act), Ronan Keating (the 1997 co-host), and Johnny Logan, singing his new single "When a Woman Loves a Man", as well as an appearance by the Belgian duo of 1973, Nicole and Hugo.

There were three medleys, consisting of live performances of past Eurovision songs. The first consisted of : Dana International, singing "Parlez-vous français ?" (originally performed by Baccara for Luxembourg in 1978, 7th place); Carola Haggkvist, singing "Främling" (Sweden 1983, 3rd); Alsou, singing "Solo" (Russia 2000, 2nd); Fabrizio Faniello, singing "Another Summer Night" (Malta 2001, 9th); Marie Myriam, singing "L'amour est bleu" (originally performed by Vicky Leandros for Luxembourg in 1967, 4th); Richard Herrey, singing "Let Me Be the One" (originally performed by The Shadows for the United Kingdom in 1975, 2nd); and Thomas Thordarson, singing "Vi maler byen rød" (originally performed by Birthe Kjær for Denmark in 1989, 3rd).

The second consisted of: Gali Atari, singing "Hallelujah" (Israel 1979, winner); Bobbysocks!, singing "La det swinge" (Norway 1985, winner); Anne-Marie David, singing "Après toi" (originally sung by Vicky Leandros for Luxembourg in 1972, winner); Lys Assia, singing "Refrain" (Switzerland 1956, winner); Sandra Kim singing "Non ho l'età" (originally sung by Gigliola Cinquetti for Italy in 1964, winner); and Bucks Fizz singing "Making Your Mind Up" (United Kingdom 1981, winner).

The third and final medley consisted of: Eimear Quinn, singing "The Voice" (Ireland 1996, winner); Charlie McGettigan and Jakob Sveistrup, singing "Rock 'n' Roll Kids" (originally sung by McGettigan and Paul Harrington for Ireland in 1994, winner); Jakob Sveistrup, singing "Talking to You" (Denmark 2005, 9th); and Linda Martin, singing "Why Me?" (Ireland 1992, winner). All four singers –Quinn, McGettigan, Sveistrup, and Martin– acted as backup singers during the show. They were also joined by the Olsen Brothers for a brief, Eurovision-themed version of their song "Walk Right Back".

=== Medleys ===
Opening medley

- Netherlands 1975: "Ding-a-dong" by Teach-In
- Israel 1978: "A-Ba-Ni-Bi" by Izhar Cohen and the Alphabeta
- France 1991: "Le Dernier qui a parlé..." by Amina
- Germany 1979: "Dschinghis Khan" by Dschinghis Khan
- United Kingdom 1997: "Love Shine a Light" by Katrina and the Waves

Winners of Eurovision

- Switzerland 1956: "Refrain" by Lys Assia
- Netherlands 1959: "Een beetje" by Teddy Scholten
- Denmark 1963: "Dansevise" by Grethe and Jørgen Ingmann
- Austria 1966: "Merci, Chérie" by Udo Jürgens
- Spain 1969: "Vivo cantando" by Salomé
- Ireland 1970: "All Kinds of Everything" by Dana
- Luxembourg 1973: "Tu te reconnaîtras" by Anne-Marie David
- France 1977: "L'Oiseau et l'Enfant" by Marie Myriam
- United Kingdom 1981: "Making Your Mind Up" by Bucks Fizz
- Sweden 1984: "Diggi-Loo Diggi-Ley" by Herreys
- Ireland 1993: "In Your Eyes" by Niamh Kavanagh
- Norway 1995: "Nocturne" by Secret Garden
- Sweden 1999: "Take Me to Your Heaven" by Charlotte Nilsson
- Latvia 2002: "I Wanna" by Marie N

Unforgettable performances

- Norway 1980: "Sámiid ædnan" by Sverre Kjelsberg and Mattis Hætta
- United Kingdom 1981: "Making Your Mind Up" by Bucks Fizz
- (Sweden) 1985: Host Lill Lindfors suffering a wardrobe malfunction live in the show.
- Germany 2000: "Wadde hadde dudde da?" by Stefan Raab
- Belgium 1980: "Euro-Vision" by Telex
- Israel 2000: "Sameach" by PingPong
- Ukraine 2005: "Razom nas bahato" by GreenJolly
- Latvia 2002: "I Wanna" by Marie N
- Slovenia 2002: "Samo ljubezen" by Sestre
- Iceland 1997: "Minn hinsti dans" by Paul Oscar
- Norway 2005: "In My Dreams" by Wig Wam
- Finland 1976: "Pump-Pump" by Fredi and the Friends
- Belgium 1973: "Baby, Baby" by Nicole and Hugo
- Austria 1981: "Wenn du da bist" by Marty Brem
- Israel 1987: "Shir Habatlanim" by Datner and Kushnir
- Yugoslavia 1991: "Brazil" by Bebi Dol
- Sweden 2000: "When Spirits Are Calling My Name" by Roger Pontare
- Switzerland 1979: "Trödler und Co" by Peter, Sue and Marc, Pfuri, Gorps and Kniri
- France 1994: "Je suis un vrai garçon" by Nina Morato
- Germany 1998: "Guildo hat euch lieb!" by Guildo Horn
- Moldova 2005: "Boonika bate doba" by Zdob și Zdub
- Austria 2003: "Weil der Mensch zählt" by Alf Poier
- Denmark 1957: "Skibet skal sejle i nat" by Birthe Wilke and Gustav Winckler

Men in Eurovision

- France 1961: "Printemps, avril carillonne" by Jean-Paul Mauric
- Spain 1962: "Llámame" by Víctor Balaguer
- Belgium 1969: "Jennifer Jennings" by Louis Neefs
- Norway 1968: "Stress" by Odd Børre
- Spain 1970: "Gwendolyne" by Julio Iglesias
- Finland 1967: "Varjoon – suojaan" by Fredi
- Netherlands 1982: "Jij en ik" by Bill van Dijk
- United Kingdom 1962: "Ring-A-Ding Girl" by Ronnie Carroll
- Italy 1965: "Se piangi, se ridi" by Bobby Solo
- Israel 1974: "Natati La Khayay" by Poogy
- Belgium 1973: "Baby, Baby" by Nicole and Hugo
- Belgium 1974: "Fleur de liberté" by Jacques Hustin
- Luxembourg 1976: "Chansons pour ceux qui s'aiment" by Jürgen Marcus
- Austria 1957: "Wohin, kleines Pony?" by Bob Martin
- Italy 1980: "Non so che darei" by Alan Sorrenti
- Ireland 1966: "Come Back to Stay" by Dickie Rock
- Sweden 1980: "Just nu!" by Tomas Ledin
- Austria 1959: "Der K und K Kalypso aus Wien" by Ferry Graf
- Russia 1995: "Kolybelnaya dlya vulkana" by Philipp Kirkorov
- Denmark 1980: "Tænker altid på dig" by Bamses Venner
- Austria 1991: "Venedig im Regen" by Thomas Forstner
- Iceland 1986: "Gleðibankinn" by ICY
- Malta 1975: "Singing This Song" by Renato

Dancing in Eurovision

- Germany 1959: "Heute Abend wollen wir tanzen geh'n" by Alice and Ellen Kessler
- Belgium 1983: "Rendez-vous" by Pas de Deux
- Denmark 1966: "Stop – mens legen er go'" by Ulla Pia
- Turkey 1987: "Şarkım Sevgi Üstüne" by Seyyal Taner and Lokomotif
- Germany 1977: "Telegram" by Silver Convention
- United Kingdom 1982: "One Step Further" by Bardo
- Austria 1977: "Boom Boom Boomerang" by Schmetterlinge
- Luxembourg 1978: "Parlez-vous français ?" by Baccara
- Germany 1979: "Dschinghis Khan" by Dschinghis Khan
- Austria 1982: "Sonntag" by Mess
- Spain 1977: "Enséñame a cantar" by Micky
- Denmark 1981: "Krøller eller ej" by Tommy Seebach and Debbie Cameron
- Belgium 1973: "Baby, Baby" by Nicole and Hugo
- United Kingdom 1983: "I'm Never Giving Up" by Sweet Dreams
- Denmark 1983: "Kloden drejer" by Gry Johansen
- Sweden 1985: "Bra vibrationer" by Kikki Danielsson
- Portugal 1982: "Bem bom" by Doce
- Norway 1986: "Romeo" by Ketil Stokkan
- Ireland 1969: "The Wages of Love" by Muriel Day
- Greece 2002: "S.A.G.A.P.O." by Michalis Rakintzis
- France 2004: "À chaque pas" by Jonatan Cerrada
- Yugoslavia 1983: "Džuli" by Daniel
- United Kingdom 1987: "Only the Light" by Rikki
- Greece 2004: "Shake It" by Sakis Rouvas
- Netherlands 1966: "Fernando en Filippo" by Milly Scott

Women in Eurovision

- Sweden 1963: "En gång i Stockholm" by Monica Zetterlund
- Spain 1961: "Estando contigo" by Conchita Bautista
- Spain 1990: "Bandido" by Azúcar Moreno
- Germany 1975: "Ein Lied kann eine Brücke sein" by Joy Fleming
- Netherlands 1993: "Vrede" by Ruth Jacott
- Greece 1991: "I anixi" by Sophia Vossou
- Spain 1983: "¿Quién maneja mi barca?" by Remedios Amaya
- United Kingdom 1996: "Ooh Aah... Just a Little Bit" by Gina G
- Russia 1997: "Primadonna" by Alla Pugacheva
- Norway 1966: "Intet er nytt under solen" by Åse Kleveland
- Monaco 1967: "Boum-Badaboum" by Minouche Barelli
- Portugal 1969: "Desfolhada portuguesa" by Simone de Oliveira
- Spain 1965: "¡Qué bueno, qué bueno!" by Conchita Bautista
- Croatia 2002: "Everything I Want" by Vesna Pisarović
- Greece 2003: "Never Let You Go" by Mando
- Belgium 1973: "Baby, Baby" by Nicole and Hugo
- Norway 1976: "Mata Hari" by Anne-Karine Strøm
- France 1967: "Il doit faire beau là-bas" by Noëlle Cordier
- Italy 1992: "Rapsodia" by Mia Martini
- Croatia 1999: "Marija Magdalena" by Doris Dragović
- Portugal 1966: "Ele e ela" by Madalena Iglésias
- Monaco 1971: "Un banc, un arbre, une rue" by Séverine
- Netherlands 1965: "'t Is genoeg" by Conny Vandenbos
- Portugal 1988: "Voltarei" by Dora

Eurovision favourites

- Luxembourg 1978: "Parlez-vous français ?" (English version) by Baccara (performed by Dana International)
- Sweden 1983: "Främling" by Carola
- Russia 2000: "Solo" by Alsou
- Malta 2001: "Another Summer Night" by Fabrizio Faniello
- Luxembourg 1967: "L'amour est bleu" by Vicky Leandros (performed by Marie Myriam)
- United Kingdom 1975: "Let Me Be the One" by The Shadows (performed by Richard Herrey)
- Denmark 1989: "Vi maler byen rød" by Birthe Kjær (performed by Tomas Thordarson)

Eurovision winners medley

- Israel 1979: "Hallelujah" (English version) by Gali Atari (of Milk and Honey)
- Norway 1985: "La det swinge" by Bobbysocks!
- Luxembourg 1972: "Après toi" by Anne-Marie David
- Switzerland 1956: "Refrain" by Lys Assia
- Italy 1964: "Non ho l'età" by Gigliola Cinquetti (performed by Sandra Kim)
- United Kingdom 1981: "Making Your Mind Up" by Bucks Fizz (Cheryl Baker, Mike Nolan and Shelley Preston)

Second places

- France 1976: "Un, deux, trois" by Catherine Ferry
- United Kingdom 1972: "Beg, Steal or Borrow" by The New Seekers
- United Kingdom 1961: "Are You Sure?" by The Allisons
- Spain 1979: "Su canción" by Betty Missiego
- Germany 1987: "Lass die Sonne in dein Herz" by Wind
- France 1991: "Le Dernier qui a parlé..." by Amina
- Germany 1981: "Johnny Blue" by Lena Valaitis
- Israel 1982: "Hora" by Avi Toledano
- Switzerland 1963: "T'en va pas" by Esther Ofarim
- Spain 1995: "Vuelve conmigo" by Anabel Conde
- Switzerland 1958: "Giorgio" by Lys Assia
- Iceland 1999: "All Out of Luck" by Selma
- France 1990: "White and Black Blues" by Joëlle Ursull
- Sweden 1966: "Nygammal vals" by Lill Lindfors and Svante Thuresson
- Denmark 2001: "Never Ever Let You Go" by Rollo and King
- Norway 1996: "I evighet" by Elisabeth Andreassen

Medley "backing vocals"

- Ireland 1996: "The Voice" performed by Eimear Quinn
- Ireland 1994: "Rock 'n' Roll Kids" performed by Charlie McGettigan and Jakob Sveistrup
- Denmark 2005: "Talking to You" performed by Jakob Sveistrup
- Ireland 1992: "Why Me?" performed by Linda Martin

== Broadcasts ==
A total of thirty-five countries broadcast the event, but only thirty-one participated in the voting.

Broadcasters and commentators in voting countries
Country	Broadcaster	Channel(s)	Commentator(s)	Ref(s)
Andorra	RTVA	ATV		
Austria	ORF	ORF 2 (Note: Deferred broadcast at 22:10 CET (21:00 UTC))	Elisabeth Engstler and Christian Ludwig	
Belgium	VRT	Eén		
Belgium	RTBF	La Une, RTBF Sat	Jean-Pierre Hautier	
Bosnia and Herzegovina	BHRT	BHT 1		
Croatia	HRT	HRT 1		
Cyprus	RIK			
Denmark	DR	DR1	Nicolai Molbech	
Finland	YLE	YLE TV2	Jaana Pelkonen and Heikki Seppälä	
Finland	YLE	YLE Radio Suomi	Sanna Kojo	
Finland	YLE	YLE Radio Vega	Hans Johansson	
Germany	ARD	Südwest Fernsehen, WDR Fernsehen		
Greece	ERT	NET	Elizabeth Filippouli	
Iceland	RÚV	Sjónvarpið, Rás 2		
Ireland	RTÉ	RTÉ Two	Marty Whelan	
Israel	IBA			
Latvia	LTV	LTV1		
Lithuania	LRT			
Macedonia	MRT			
Malta	PBS	TVM	Tony Micallef	
Monaco	TMC Monte Carlo		Bernard Montiel and Yves Lecoq	
Netherlands	TROS	Nederland 2	Willem van Beusekom	
Norway	NRK	NRK1	Jostein Pedersen	
Poland	TVP	TVP1		
Portugal	RTP	RTP1		
Romania	TVR			
Russia	Channel One			
Serbia and Montenegro	RTS	RTS 1		
Slovenia	RTVSLO	SLO 1	Mojca Mavec	
Spain	TVE	La Primera	José María Íñigo and Beatriz Pécker	
Sweden	SVT	SVT1	Pekka Heino	
Switzerland	SRG SSR	SF 1		
Switzerland	SRG SSR	TSR 1	Jean-Marc Richard	
Switzerland	SRG SSR	TSI 1		
Turkey	TRT	TRT 1		
Ukraine	NTU	Pershyi Natsionalnyi		

Broadcasters and commentators in non-voting countries
Country	Broadcaster	Channel(s)	Commentator(s)	Ref(s)
Albania	RTSH			
Armenia	AMPTV			
Australia	SBS	SBS TV (Note: Deferred broadcast on 23 October at 20:30 AEST (10:30 UTC))	Marty Whelan	
Hungary	MR	Petőfi Rádió (Note: Delayed broadcast on 15 November at 23:15 CET (22:15 UTC))	Erzsébet Jeney	
Kosovo	RTK	RTK		

=== Viewing figures ===
Estimated viewership by country (in millions)
Country	Viewership
Austria	0.80
Belgium	1 (VRT)
Cyprus	0.07
Denmark	1.42
Finland	0.44
Germany	0.63 (SWR, WDR)
Netherlands	1.2
Norway	0.97
Poland	3.2
Portugal	0.85
Spain	2.83
Sweden	2

=== Non-participating countries ===
Countries that have previously competed but were not involved with the broadcast or voting of the contest;

- Belarus
- Bulgaria
- Estonia
- France
- Italy
- Luxembourg
- Moldova
- Morocco
- Slovakia
- United Kingdom

The BBC (UK), RAI (Italy) and France Télévisions chose not to broadcast the event. Søren Therkelsen, the commissioning editor of the event, said he was "disappointed" at the broadcasters' decision not to transmit the show. The BBC chose not to carry the event as it was "too remote" for British audiences.

== Official album ==
Cover art of the official album

To coincide with the broadcast of the programme, an official compilation album for the 50th anniversary titled The Very Best of the Eurovision Song Contest (also known as Congratulations: 50 Years of the Eurovision Song Contest), was put together by the European Broadcasting Union and released by CMC International on 21 October 2005. The compilation featured over 100 songs, including all Eurovision Song Contest winners from 1956 until 2005 and a selection of all-time favourites, that was divided into 2 separate double CDs: 1956–1980 and 1981–2005. The 22-page booklet includes information about the entries, contestants and venues.
