= Spain in the Eurovision Song Contest 1987 =

- Eurovision Song Contest 1987
- Participating broadcaster: Televisión Española (TVE)
- Country: Spain
- Selection process: Internal selection
- Announcement date: Artist: 3 April 1987; Song: 11 April 1987

Competing entry
- Song: "No estás solo"
- Artist: Patricia Kraus
- Songwriters: Rafael Martínez; Rafael Trabucchelli; Patricia Kraus

Placement
- Final result: 19th, 10 points

Participation chronology

Spain was represented at the Eurovision Song Contest 1987 with the song "No estás solo", composed by Rafael Martínez and Rafael Trabucchelli, with lyrics by Patricia Kraus, and performed by Kraus herself. The Spanish participating broadcaster, Televisión Española (TVE), internally selected its entry for the contest. The song, performed in position 9, placed nineteenth out of twenty-two competing entries with 10 points.

== Before Eurovision ==
Televisión Española (TVE) internally selected "No estás solo" performed by Patricia Kraus as its entry for the Eurovision Song Contest 1987. The song was composed by Rafael Martínez and Rafael Trabucchelli, and had lyrics by Kraus herself. The performer was announced on 3 April 1987. The song was premiered on the TVE show Sábado noche on 11 April. She also recorded an English version of the song titled "With love".

== At Eurovision ==
On 9 May 1987, the Eurovision Song Contest was held at the Centenary Palace in Brussels hosted by the Radio-télévision belge de la Communauté française (RTBF), and broadcast live throughout the continent. Kraus performed "No estás solo" 9th on the evening, following Portugal and preceding Turkey. Eduardo Leiva conducted the event's orchestra performance of the Spanish entry. At the close of the voting "No estás solo" had received 10 points, all from Greece, placing 19th in a field of 22.

TVE broadcast the contest in Spain on TVE 2 with commentary by Beatriz Pécker. Before the event, TVE aired a talk show hosted by Isabel Borondo introducing the Spanish jury, which continued after the contest commenting on the results.

=== Voting ===
TVE assembled a jury panel with eleven members. The following members comprised the Spanish jury:

- Fran de Gonari – designer and stylist
- Concepción Meller – housewife
- Feliciano Castañes – taxi driver
- Miguel Durán Campos – general director of ONCE
- Pilar Zanca – businesswoman
- Raúl Díaz – student
- José Fernández – waiter
- María Rosa Sánchez – telephonist
- Marieta Lainz – navigator
- José Miguel García – metro driver
- Francisco Ortega – businessman

The jury was chaired by Luis Calvo. The jury awarded its maximum of 12 points to Italy.

Points awarded to Spain
Score	Country
12 points	
10 points	Greece
8 points	
7 points	
6 points	
5 points	
4 points	
3 points	
2 points	
1 point	

Points awarded by Spain
Score	Country
12 points	Italy
10 points	Ireland
8 points	Portugal
7 points	Belgium
6 points	Yugoslavia
5 points	Netherlands
4 points	Iceland
3 points	Norway
2 points	Finland
1 point	Germany
