= France in the Eurovision Song Contest 1987 =

- Eurovision Song Contest 1987
- Participating broadcaster: Antenne 2
- Country: France
- Selection process: National final
- Selection date: 4 April 1987

Competing entry
- Song: "Les mots d'amour n'ont pas de dimanche"
- Artist: Christine Minier
- Songwriters: Marc Minier; Gérard Curci

Placement
- Final result: 14th, 44 points

Participation chronology

France was represented at the Eurovision Song Contest 1987 with the song "Les mots d'amour n'ont pas de dimanche", composed by Marc Minier, with lyrics by Gérard Curci, and performed by Christine Minier. The French participating broadcaster, Antenne 2, selected its entry via a national final, which would prove to be the last French national final until 1999. At the time of her participation, Minier was not a professional singer, nor did she subsequently launch a professional career.

== Before Eurovision ==
=== National final ===
Antenne 2 held the national final on 4 April 1987, hosted by Marie-Ange Nardi and Patrick Simpson. Ten songs took part with the winner chosen by a panel of television viewers who were telephoned and asked to vote on the songs.

| R/O | Artist | Song | Points | Place |
|---|---|---|---|---|
| 1 | Jacques Payan | "Vivre libre" | 74 | 7 |
| 2 | Pascale Fontenel | "Bonheur ordinateur" | 28 | 10 |
| 3 | Isabelle Gautier | "Ciné-climat" | 29 | 9 |
| 4 | Patrick Alès | "À tout vent" | 137 | 3 |
| 5 | Cathy Solo | "Manolito" | 58 | 8 |
| 6 | Christine Minier | "Les mots d'amour n'ont pas de dimanche" | 163 | 1 |
| 7 | Pascal Tafuri | "Délit de fuite" | 110 | 6 |
| 8 | Marilyne and Marina | "Marilyne et Marina" | 150 | 2 |
| 9 | Joël Barret | "La clef du temps" | 126 | 5 |
| 10 | Damien Natangelo | "Vivre pour aimer" | 127 | 4 |

== At Eurovision ==
On the evening of the final Minier performed 15th in the running order, following the United Kingdom and preceding Germany. At the close of voting "Les mots d'amour n'ont pas de dimanche" had received 44 points, placing France 14th of the 22 entries. The French jury awarded its 12 points to the Netherlands.

=== Voting ===
Points awarded to France
| Score | Country |
|---|---|
| 12 points | Luxembourg |
| 10 points | Ireland |
| 8 points | |
| 7 points | |
| 6 points | |
| 5 points | Germany; Italy |
| 4 points | Greece; Iceland |
| 3 points | |
| 2 points | Switzerland |
| 1 point | Netherlands; Norway |

Points awarded by France
| Score | Country |
|---|---|
| 12 points | Netherlands |
| 10 points | Israel |
| 8 points | Denmark |
| 7 points | Greece |
| 6 points | Germany |
| 5 points | Cyprus |
| 4 points | Norway |
| 3 points | Sweden |
| 2 points | Yugoslavia |
| 1 point | Ireland |
