= Aleksandersen =

Aleksandersen is a Norwegian patronymic surname, literally meaning "son of Aleksander". It may refer to:

- Åge Aleksandersen (born 1949), Norwegian singer, songwriter and guitarist
- Frank Aleksandersen (born 1953), Norwegian singer and drummer
- Oddny Aleksandersen (born 1942), Norwegian politician
