= Eurovision Song Contest 1987 =

International song competition

Date and venue
- Final: 9 May 1987
- Venue: Centenary Palace; Brussels, Belgium

Organisation
- Organiser: European Broadcasting Union (EBU)
- Scrutineer: Frank Naef

Production
- Host broadcaster: Radio-télévision belge de la Communauté française (RTBF)
- Director: Jacques Bourton
- Executive producer: Michel Gehu
- Musical director: Jo Carlier
- Presenter: Viktor Lazlo

Participants
- Number of entries: 22
- Returning countries: Greece; Italy
- Participation map: Competing countries Countries that participated in the past but not in 1987

Vote
- Voting system: Each country awarded 1-12 point(s) to their 10 favourite songs
- Winning song: Ireland "Hold Me Now"

The Eurovision Song Contest 1987 was the 32nd edition of the Eurovision Song Contest, held on 9 May 1987 at the Centenary Palace in Brussels, Belgium, and presented by Viktor Lazlo. It was organised by the European Broadcasting Union (EBU) and host broadcaster Radio-télévision belge de la Communauté française (RTBF), who staged the event after winning the 1986 contest for Belgium with the song "J'aime la vie" by Sandra Kim.

Broadcasters from twenty-two countries participated in the contest with Greece and Italy returning to the competition after their absences the previous year. This set the record for the highest number of competing countries up until that point.

The winner was Ireland with the song "Hold Me Now" by Johnny Logan, who had also won the 1980 contest. He became the first performer to have won the Eurovision Song Contest twice. Germany, Italy, Yugoslavia, Netherlands and Denmark rounded out the top five. Turkey finished in last place, earning nul points for the second time, after 1983.

== Location ==
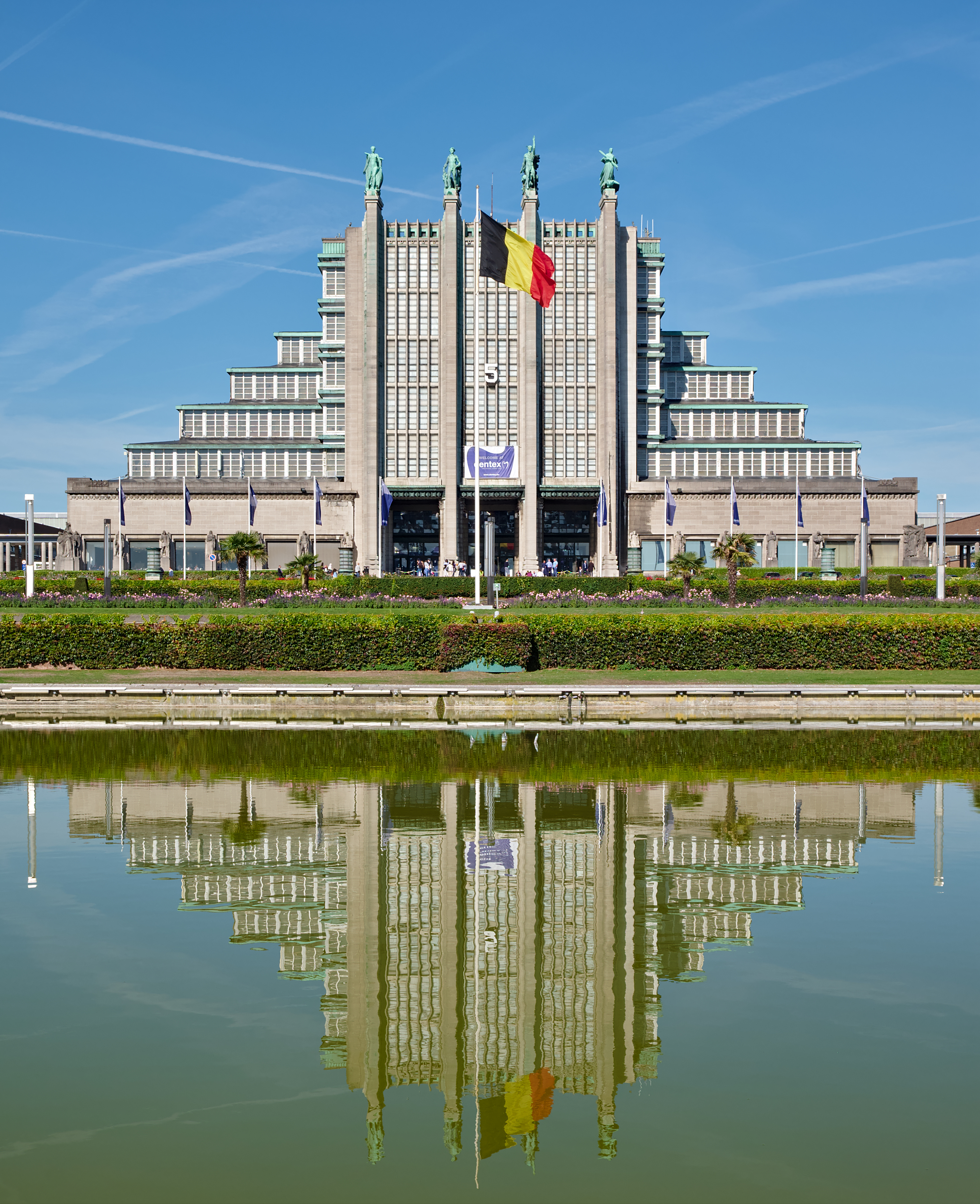
The Centenary Palace of the Brussels Exhibition Centre, host venue of the 1987 contest

The contest took place at the Brussels Exhibition Centre (Brussels Expo) in Brussels, Belgium. These are a set of exhibition halls built from 1930 on the Heysel/Heizel Plateau (Heysel Park) in Laeken (northern part of the City of Brussels) to celebrate the centenary of Belgian Independence. The Centenary Palace (French: Palais du Centenaire, Dutch: Eeuwfeestpaleis), where the main stage was located, is one of the remaining buildings of the Brussels International Exposition of 1935. Currently, it is still being used for trade fairs, as well as concerts, usually for bigger acts and artists.

=== Host city selection process ===
Locations of the considered venues: the chosen venue is marked in blue, while the eliminated locations are marked in red.

As part of the selection process of the host city and venue, a joint committee including members from the two Belgian broadcasters, Walloon Radio-télévision belge de la Communauté française (RTBF) and Flemish Belgische Radio- en Televisieomroep (BRT), was formed, which proposed to hold the contest in the Bourla Theatre as both locations proposed by RTBF, namely the Centenary Palace in Brussels and the Patinoire de Coronmeuse in Liège, would have required heavy renovation works to meet the proposed technical specifications for the contest. Nevertheless, RTBF demanded the event be held in Brussels due to its symbolism as the perceived capital of the European Union, and on 6 October 1986 it announced that the contest would be held at the Centenary Palace without consulting it with BRT. The Flemish newspaper Het Laatste Nieuws reported that BRT proposed to instead host the contest at the Cirque Royal, adding that it would withdraw from co-organising the contest if its counteroffer was not chosen. Despite this, RTBF moved forward with its plans and confirmed that the Centenary Palace as the host venue, with BRT committing to its decision of abandoning the hosting project but keeping the duties of competing in the contest representing Belgium.

== Participants ==
Eurovision Song Contest 1987 – Participation summaries by country
- Austria; Belgium; Cyprus; Denmark; Finland; France; Germany; Greece; Iceland; Ireland; Israel; Italy; Luxembourg; Netherlands; Norway; Portugal; Spain; Sweden; Switzerland; Turkey; United Kingdom; Yugoslavia

The Eurovision Song Contest 1987 was the biggest contest to date, and it was also the first in which 22 countries competed. Only Malta, Monaco and Morocco failed to compete out of all the countries which had entered the contest in the past. To date, this was the largest number of countries participating in the contest, with the maximum number up until then being 20. As this had never happened, the EBU was forced to review the rules and production calendar after this edition, and fearing that the number would increase again, it was decided that from this edition onwards, the maximum number of participants would also be 22. This was a problematic question over the next six years as new and returning nations indicated an interest in participating, but they could not be accommodated.

Several of the performing artists had previously competed as lead artists in past editions for the same country. Gary Lux had represented Austria in 1983 as part of Westend, and in 1985 as a soloist; and he had additionally provided backing vocals in 1984. Alexia had represented Cyprus in 1981 as part of Island. Wind had represented Germany in 1985. Johnny Logan had won the contest for Ireland in 1980.

Eurovision Song Contest 1987 participants
Country	Broadcaster	Artist	Song	Language	Songwriter(s)	Conductor
Austria	ORF	Gary Lux	"Nur noch Gefühl"	German	Stefanie Werger; Kenneth Westmore	Richard Oesterreicher
Belgium	BRT	Liliane Saint-Pierre	"Soldiers of Love"	Dutch	Marc De Coen; Liliane Keuninckx; Gyuri Spies	Freddy Sunder
Cyprus	CyBC	Alexia	"Aspro mavro" (Άσπρο μαύρο)	Greek	Andreas Papapavlou; Maria Papapavlou	Jo Carlier
Denmark	DR	Bandjo with Anne-Cathrine Herdorf	"En lille melodi"	Danish	Helge Engelbrecht; Jacob Jonia	Henrik Krogsgaard
Finland	YLE	Vicky Rosti	"Sata salamaa"	Finnish	Petri Laaksonen; Veli-Pekka Lehto	Ossi Runne
France	Antenne 2	Christine Minier	"Les mots d'amour n'ont pas de dimanche"	French	Gérard Curci; Marc Minier	Jean-Claude Petit
Germany	BR (Note: On behalf of the German public broadcasting consortium ARD)	Wind	"Laß die Sonne in dein Herz"	German	Bernd Meinunger; Ralph Siegel	Laszlo Bencker
Greece	ERT	Bang	"Stop" (Στοπ)	Greek	Vassilis Dertilis; Thanos Kalliris	Giorgos Niarchos
Iceland	RÚV	Halla Margrét	"Hægt og hljótt"	Icelandic	Valgeir Guðjónsson	Hjálmar H. Ragnarsson
Ireland	RTÉ	Johnny Logan	"Hold Me Now"	English	Seán Sherrard	Noel Kelehan
Israel	IBA	Datner and Kushnir	"Shir Habatlanim" (שיר הבטלנים)	Hebrew	Zohar Laskov	Kobi Oshrat
Italy	RAI	Umberto Tozzi and Raf	"Gente di mare"	Italian	Giancarlo Bigazzi; Raf Riefoli; Umberto Tozzi	Gianfranco Lombardi
Luxembourg	CLT	Plastic Bertrand	"Amour amour"	French	Roger Jouret; Alec Mansion	Alec Mansion
Netherlands	NOS	Marcha	"Rechtop in de wind"	Dutch	Peter Koelewijn	Rogier van Otterloo
Norway	NRK	Kate Gulbrandsen	"Mitt liv"	Norwegian	Hanne Krogh; Rolf Løvland	Terje Fjærn
Portugal	RTP	Nevada	"Neste barco à vela"	Portuguese	Alfredo Azinheira; Jorge Mendes	Jaime Oliveira
Spain	TVE	Patricia Kraus	"No estás solo"	Spanish	Patricia Kraus; Rafael Martínez; Rafael Trabucchelli	Eduardo Leiva
Sweden	SVT	Lotta Engberg	"Boogaloo"	Swedish	Christer Lundh; Mikael Wendt	Curt-Eric Holmquist
Switzerland	SRG SSR	Carol Rich	"Moitié moitié"	French	Jean-Jacques Egli	No conductor
Turkey	TRT	Seyyal Taner and Grup Lokomotif	"Şarkım Sevgi Üstüne"	Turkish	Olcayto Ahmet Tuğsuz	Garo Mafyan
United Kingdom	BBC	Rikki	"Only the Light"	English	Richard Peebles	Ronnie Hazlehurst
Yugoslavia	JRT	Novi fosili	"Ja sam za ples" (Ја сам за плес)	Serbo-Croatian	Stevo Cvikić; Rajko Dujmić	Nikica Kalogjera

== Production and format ==
=== Host broadcaster rule ===
By 1986, Belgium had participated in the Eurovision Song Contest 30 times since making its debut at the first contest in 1956 along six other countries. Belgium was the only one of the seven founding countries to have never won the contest and had only finished in the top five four times (with "Un peu de poivre, un peu de sel" by Tonia in 1966 placing fourth, "L'amour ça fait chanter la vie" by Jean Vallée in 1978 placing second, "Si tu aimes ma musique" by Stella in 1982 placing fourth, and "Avanti la vie" by Jacques Zegers in 1984 placing fifth).

Their Eurovision victory in 1986, with J'aime la vie by Sandra Kim, occurred amidst a complex political situation in Belgium. The country was undergoing massive constitutional reforms in which the Belgian state was transitioning from a centralized to a federal system. This was due to rising tensions between the two major linguistic regions of Belgium, Dutch-speaking Flanders and French-speaking Wallonia. Both regions had had independent broadcasters since 1960 (BRT in Flanders and RTBF in Wallonia) but had still agreed to jointly host the contest in the event of a Belgian victory. While the triumph of "J'aime la vie" in 1986 – an entry sent by French-speaking RTBF – reignited a sense of national union across all Belgian regions, the two regional broadcasters weren't able to overcome their disagreements and joint host the competition. During the production of the event, BRT eventually withdrew from the project and RTBF organised the contest alone as host broadcaster. As a consequence, the host country images in Eurovision 1987 mostly showed footage of Wallonia. BRT still remained in charge of the participation in the contest competing for Belgium.

=== Budget ===
Holding the contest in Belgium caused several legal changes in the country's system and forced the implementation of most of the modern rules and regulations on the monetization of public television. This led to the authorization of advertising, sponsorships, and marketing actions in the two public channels in the country. As a consequence, the RTBF was also allowed to sell sponsorship quotas for the event, setting a new precedent for the Eurovision Song Contest.

For RTBF, this decision was a relief as the event was almost entirely privately funded. This opened the doors to the commercial potential of the event itself, starting a period of modernization and increased interest for the event. Apart from the latent tensions, after the end of the contest the then-president of the BRT Cas Goossens praised RTBF for their "perfect organization" while at the same time regretting that the two broadcasters were not able to collaborate. He added that the cost of hosting the Eurovision Song Contest would have been difficult to justify to the Flemish taxpayers.

=== Rehearsals ===
Dress rehearsals began on 24–25 April.

== Contest overview ==
Results of the Eurovision Song Contest 1987
R/O	Country	Artist	Song	Points	Place
1	Norway	Kate Gulbrandsen	"Mitt liv"	65	9
2	Israel	Datner and Kushnir	"Shir Habatlanim"	73	8
3	Austria	Gary Lux	"Nur noch Gefühl"	8	20
4	Iceland	Halla Margrét	"Hægt og hljótt"	28	16
5	Belgium	Liliane Saint-Pierre	"Soldiers of Love"	56	11
6	Sweden	Lotta Engberg	"Boogaloo"	50	12
7	Italy	Umberto Tozzi and Raf	"Gente di mare"	103	3
8	Portugal	Nevada	"Neste barco à vela"	15	18
9	Spain	Patricia Kraus	"No estás solo"	10	19
10	Turkey	Seyyal Taner and Grup Lokomotif	"Şarkım Sevgi Üstüne"	0	22
11	Greece	Bang	"Stop"	64	10
12	Netherlands	Marcha	"Rechtop in de wind"	83	5
13	Luxembourg	Plastic Bertrand	"Amour amour"	4	21
14	United Kingdom	Rikki	"Only the Light"	47	13
15	France	Christine Minier	"Les mots d'amour n'ont pas de dimanche"	44	14
16	Germany	Wind	"Laß die Sonne in dein Herz"	141	2
17	Cyprus	Alexia	"Aspro mavro"	80	7
18	Finland	Vicky Rosti	"Sata salamaa"	32	15
19	Denmark	Bandjo with Anne-Cathrine Herdorf	"En lille melodi"	83	5
20	Ireland	Johnny Logan	"Hold Me Now"	172	1
21	Yugoslavia	Novi fosili	"Ja sam za ples"	92	4
22	Switzerland	Carol Rich	"Moitié moitié"	26	17

=== Spokespersons ===
Each participating broadcaster appointed a spokesperson who was responsible for announcing the votes for its respective country via telephone. Known spokespersons at the 1987 contest are listed below.

- Belgium – An Ploegaerts
- Finland – Solveig Herlin
- Iceland – Guðrún Skúladóttir
- Netherlands – Ralph Inbar
- Sweden – Jan Ellerås
- United Kingdom – Colin Berry
- Yugoslavia – Ljiljana Tipsarević

== Detailed voting results ==
Detailed voting results
		Total score	Norway	Israel	Austria	Iceland	Belgium	Sweden	Italy	Portugal	Spain	Turkey	Greece	Netherlands	Luxembourg	United Kingdom	France	Germany	Cyprus	Finland	Denmark	Ireland	Yugoslavia	Switzerland
Contestants	Norway	65			4		7	10	7		3			4			4	7	3	5	3	2		6
Contestants	Israel	73	2		1	5	6	4		10				3		4	10	8		7		5		8
Contestants	Austria	8							1				7											
Contestants	Iceland	28	4				4				4		6					10						
Contestants	Belgium	56	5	2	3				6		7	4			5	8		4	5	3			4	
Contestants	Sweden	50		12		8	1		3	7		2					3		7		7			
Contestants	Italy	103		3	6	3	5	1		12	12	8			4	1		12	1	4		12	12	7
Contestants	Portugal	15									8		5					2						
Contestants	Spain	10											10											
Contestants	Turkey	0																						
Contestants	Greece	64				1	2	6	8					5	7	5	7		12		6		5	
Contestants	Netherlands	83		5	2				10		5	7	3		8	3	12			2	2	6	8	10
Contestants	Luxembourg	4								2						2								
Contestants	United Kingdom	47		10	5		3	5		3		3			1				2	1	4	3	2	5
Contestants	France	44	1			4			5				4	1	12			5				10		2
Contestants	Germany	141	3	8	10	12	10	7	4	5	1	6		10	6	10	6		6	10	12	7	7	1
Contestants	Cyprus	80	6			6		2					12	2		6	5	3		6	10	8	10	4
Contestants	Finland	32	10					3		4	2		1	8	2			1					1	
Contestants	Denmark	83	7	6	7	7		8	2	1		1	8	6		7	8			8		4		3
Contestants	Ireland	172	8	4	12		12	12	12	8	10	10		12	10	12	1	6	8	12	5		6	12
Contestants	Yugoslavia	92	12	7	8	10	8			6	6	12	2				2		10		8	1		
Contestants	Switzerland	26		1		2						5		7	3				4		1		3	

=== 12 points ===
Below is a summary of all 12 points in the final:

N.	Contestant	Nation(s) giving 12 points
8	Ireland	Austria, Belgium, Finland, Italy, Netherlands, Sweden, Switzerland, United Kingdom
5	Italy	Germany, Ireland, Portugal, Spain, Yugoslavia
2	Germany	Denmark, Iceland
2	Yugoslavia	Norway, Turkey
1	Cyprus	Greece
1	France	Luxembourg
1	Greece	Cyprus
1	Netherlands	France
1	Sweden	Israel

== Broadcasts ==
Each participating broadcaster was required to relay the contest via its networks. Non-participating EBU member broadcasters were also able to relay the contest as "passive participants". Broadcasters were able to send commentators to provide coverage of the contest in their own native language and to relay information about the artists and songs to their television viewers.

It was reported that 500 million viewers in 25 countries would see the contest. Known details on the broadcasts in each country, including the specific broadcasting stations and commentators are shown in the tables below.

Broadcasters and commentators in participating countries
Country	Broadcaster	Channel(s)	Commentator(s)	Ref(s)
Austria	ORF	FS1	Ernst Grissemann	
Belgium	BRT	TV1	Luc Appermont	
Belgium	BRT	BRT 2		
Belgium	RTBF	RTBF1	Claude Delacroix	
Belgium	RTBF	Radio Deux		
Cyprus	CyBC	RIK, A Programma		
Denmark	DR	DR TV	Jørgen de Mylius	
Finland	YLE	TV1, 2-verkko	Erkki Toivanen	
France	Antenne 2		Patrick Simpson-Jones	
Germany	ARD	Erstes Deutsches Fernsehen	Lotti Ohnesorge and Christoph Deumling	
Greece	ERT	ERT		
Iceland	RÚV	Sjónvarpið, Rás 1	Kolbrún Halldórsdóttir	
Ireland	RTÉ	RTÉ 1	Marty Whelan	
Ireland	RTÉ	RTÉ FM3	Larry Gogan	
Israel	IBA	Israeli Television		
Italy	RAI	Rai Due (Note: Deferred broadcast at 22:45 (CEST))	Rosanna Vaudetti	
Italy	Videouno			
Luxembourg	CLT	RTL Télévision	Frédérique Ries	
Luxembourg	CLT	RTL plus	Matthias Krings	
Netherlands	NOS	Nederland 1	Willem van Beusekom	
Norway	NRK	NRK Fjernsynet, NRK P2	John Andreassen	
Portugal	RTP	RTP1		
Spain	TVE	TVE 2	Beatriz Pécker	
Sweden	SVT	TV1	Fredrik Belfrage	
Sweden	RR	SR P3	Jacob Dahlin	
Switzerland	SRG SSR	SRG Sportkette	Bernard Thurnheer	
Switzerland	SRG SSR	SSR Chaîne Sportive	Serge Moisson	
Switzerland	SRG SSR	SSR Canale Sportivo		
Switzerland	Radio 24			
Turkey	TRT	TV1		
United Kingdom	BBC	BBC1	Terry Wogan	
United Kingdom	BBC	BBC Radio 2 (Note: Simulcast on BBC Radio 1 VHF, BBC Radio Cambridgeshire, BBC Radio Devon, BBC Radio Humberside, BBC Radio Leeds, BBC Radio Leicester, BBC Radio Oxford, BBC Radio Solent, BBC Radio Wales, and BBC Radio York.)	Ray Moore	
Yugoslavia	JRT	TV Beograd 1, TV Zagreb 1, TV Novi Sad, TV Sarajevo 1, TV Titograd 1	Ksenija Urličić	
Yugoslavia	JRT	TV Koper-Capodistria		
Yugoslavia	JRT	TV Ljubljana 1	Vesna Pfeifer	
Yugoslavia	JRT	TV Prishtina		
Yugoslavia	JRT	TV Skopje 1		

Broadcasters and commentators in non-participating countries
Country	Broadcaster	Channel(s)	Commentator(s)	Ref(s)
Australia	SBS	SBS TV (Note: Delayed broadcast on 11 May 1987 at 20:30 (AEST))		
Bulgaria	BT	BT 1 (Note: Delayed broadcast on 6 June 1987 at 22:10 (EEST))		
Czechoslovakia	ČST	II. program (Note: Delayed broadcast on 6 June 1987 at 16:55 (CEST))		
Faroe Islands	SvF			
Greenland	KNR	KNR (Note: Delayed broadcast on 23 May 1987 at 20:05 (WGST))		
Hungary	MTV	MTV2 (Note: Deferred broadcast the following day at 20:00 (CEST))	István Vágó	
Jordan	JRTV	JTV2		
Poland	TP	TP1 (Note: Delayed broadcast on 23 May 1987 at 20:00 (CEST))		
South Korea	KBS	1TV (Note: Delayed broadcast on 29 May 1987 at 21:50 (KST))		
South Korea	KBS	2FM (Note: Delayed broadcast on 16 May 1987 at 11:00 (KST))		
Soviet Union	CT USSR	Programme One (Note: Delayed broadcast on 4 June 1987 at 23:25 (MSD))		
Soviet Union	ETV			

== See also ==
- Eurovision Young Dancers 1987
