= Denmark in the Eurovision Song Contest 1987 =

- Eurovision Song Contest 1987
- Participating broadcaster: Danmarks Radio (DR)
- Country: Denmark
- Selection process: Dansk Melodi Grand Prix 1987
- Selection date: 28 February 1987

Competing entry
- Song: "En lille melodi"
- Artist: Bandjo with Anne-Cathrine Herdorf
- Songwriters: Helge Engelbrecht; Jacob Jonia

Placement
- Final result: 5th, 83 points

Participation chronology

Denmark was represented at the Eurovision Song Contest 1987 with the song "En lille melodi", composed by Helge Engelbrecht, with lyrics by both Engelbrecht and Jacob Jonia, and performed by Anne-Cathrine Herdorf, supported by the group Bandjo. The Danish participating broadcaster, Danmarks Radio (DR), organised the Dansk Melodi Grand Prix 1987 in order to select its entry for the contest.

== Before Eurovision ==
=== Dansk Melodi Grand Prix 1987 ===
Danmarks Radio (DR) held its national final titled Dansk Melodi Grand Prix 1987 at the Tivoli Concert Hall in Copenhagen on 28 February 1987 at 20:15 CEST. It was broadcast on DR TV and also on Greenland's KNR-TV in a delayed broadcast on 14 March. The program was produced by Jens Bom, with the set being designed by Ole Koefoed, and was hosted by Jørgen de Mylius. Ten songs, which were accompanied by a orchestra led by Henrik Krogsgaard, took part in the competition, with the winner being decided by voting from five regional juries in two rounds. In the first round, the five lowest-placed songs were eliminated without full voting being revealed, then the remaining five were voted on again to give the winner. Other participants included past and future Danish representatives Dario Campeotto, Tommy Seebach, Birthe Kjær and Kirsten Siggaard of Hot Eyes.

First Round – 28 February 1987
R/O	Artist	Song	Composer	Lyricist	Result
1	Kirsten Siggaard	"Farvel og tak"	Søren Bundgaard	Keld Heick	Qualified
2	Dorthe Kollo and Johnny Reimar	"Sig mig hva' du ude på"	Jacob Jonia		—N/a
3	Trine Dyrholm	"Danse i måneskin"	Frans Bak	Niller	Qualified
4	Dario Campeotto	"Stjerner på himlen"	Kjeld Ruud Hansen	Merete Ruud Hansen	—N/a
5	Keld and Hilda Heick	"Ha' det godt"	Carsten Lehn	Hilda Heick; Keld Heick	—N/a
6	Lille Palle	"Good-bye Joe"	Ole Bredahl		—N/a
7	Birthe Kjær	"Hva' er du ude på"	Per Meilstrup	Hilda Heick; Keld Heick	Qualified
8	Tommy Seebach	"Det' gratis"	Tommy Seebach	Keld Heick	Qualified
9	Anne-Cathrine Herdorf and Drengene	"En lille melodi"	Helge Engelbrecht	Helge Engelbrecht; Jacob Jonia	Qualified
10	Limelight	"Helt normalt"	Torben Lundgren		—N/a

Second Round – 28 February 1987
R/O	Artist	Song	Regional Juries					Total	Place
R/O	Artist	Song	North and West Jutland	Zealand and Islands	East and South Jutland	Greater Copenhagen	Funen	Total	Place
1	Tommy Seebach	"Det' gratis"	6	2	6	1	2	17	4
2	Trine Dyrholm	"Danse i måneskin"	2	4	4	4	6	20	3
3	Anne-Cathrine Herdorf and Drengene	"En lille melodi"	8	8	8	8	8	40	1
4	Kirsten Siggaard	"Farvel og tak"	1	1	1	2	1	6	5
5	Birthe Kjær	"Hva' er du ude på"	4	6	2	6	4	22	2

== At Eurovision ==
On the night of the final, Herdorf performed 19th in the running order, following Finland and preceding eventual contest winners Ireland. At the close of voting the song had received 83 points, placing Denmark joint 5th (with the Netherlands) of the 22 entries. The Danish jury awarded its 12 points to Germany.

The contest was broadcast on DR TV, with commentary by Jørgen de Mylius.

=== Voting ===
Points awarded to Denmark
Score	Country
12 points	
10 points	
8 points	Finland; France; Greece; Sweden
7 points	Austria; Iceland; Norway; United Kingdom
6 points	Israel; Netherlands
5 points	
4 points	Ireland
3 points	Switzerland
2 points	Italy
1 point	Portugal; Turkey

Points awarded by Denmark
Score	Country
12 points	Germany
10 points	Cyprus
8 points	Yugoslavia
7 points	Sweden
6 points	Greece
5 points	Ireland
4 points	United Kingdom
3 points	Norway
2 points	Netherlands
1 point	Switzerland
