= Switzerland in the Eurovision Song Contest 1987 =

- Eurovision Song Contest 1987
- Participating broadcaster: Swiss Broadcasting Corporation (SRG SSR)
- Country: Switzerland
- Selection process: Concorso Eurovisione della Canzone 1987: Finale Svizzera
- Selection date: 31 January 1987

Competing entry
- Song: "Moitié moitié"
- Artist: Carol Rich
- Songwriter: Jean-Jacques Egli

Placement
- Final result: 17th, 26 points

Participation chronology

Switzerland was represented at the Eurovision Song Contest 1987 with the song "Moitié moitié", written by Jean-Jacques Egli, and performed by Carol Rich. The Swiss participating broadcaster, the Swiss Broadcasting Corporation (SRG SSR), selected its entry for the contest through a national final.

== Before Eurovision ==
=== Regional selections ===
The Swiss Broadcasting Corporation (SRG SSR) held a national final to select its entry for the Eurovision Song Contest 1987. Each division of SRG SSR — Swiss German and Romansh broadcaster Schweizer Fernsehen der deutschen und rätoromanischen Schweiz (SF DRS), Swiss French broadcaster Télévision suisse romande (TSR), and Swiss Italian broadcaster Televisione Svizzera di lingua italiana (TSI) — used its own method to select its entries for the final. Eligible songs were required to have been composed by songwriters from Switzerland or Liechtenstein, and the deadline for the song registration was on 10 October 1986.

SF DRS reported that due to low results of the Swiss-German songs in the previous Swiss selection, a jury would decide its three songs for the final from a lineup of ten songs. However, it is unknown if this preliminary round materialized, since there are no known mentions of it on Swiss broadcast guides. It is also unknown how the remaining regional broadcasters selected their songs.

=== Concorso Eurovisione della Canzone 1987: Finale Svizzera ===
TSI staged the national final on 31 January 1987 at 20:30 (CET) at its studios in Lugano. It was hosted by Letizia Brunati. The final was broadcast on TV DRS (with commentary by Beat Antenen), TSR (with commentary by Serge Moisson), and TSI. Daniela Simons (who represented Switzerland in 1986), Stefan Milenković, and Pep Bou made guest appearances.

Ten songs were initially set to compete in the national final, with three songs in French, German, and Italian, and one in Romansh. Among the participants was Marc Dietrich — who represented Switzerland in 1971, 1976, 1979, and 1981 as a member of Peter, Sue and Marc. Ils Furbazs would later represent Switzerland in 1989. "Mit Musik bin ich niemals allein" by Annetta Philip was previously presented in the 1986 Swiss-German preliminary round. "Amoureux d'elle" by Claude Lander was later disqualified due to Lander withdrawing from the selection, citing personal reasons. He offered Alexandre Castel to perform in the event in his place, but the offer was rejected by the organizers.

Participating entries
Broadcaster	Artist(s)	Song	Songwriter(s)		Language
Broadcaster	Artist(s)	Song	Composer(s)	Lyricist	Language
RTSI	Gianni Maselli	"I giorni miei"	Anita Huguenin		Italian
RTSI	Paolo Monte	"Questa vida"	Renato Mascetti		Italian
RTSI	Rita Nessi and I Team	"Dimentica"	Aldo Pitchen		Italian
SF DRS	Annetta Philip	"Mit Musik bin ich niemals allein"	Hazy Osterwald	Günter Loose	German
SF DRS	Manuela Felice	"Die Liebe ist eine Reise"	Claudia Felice; Manuela Felice	Manuela Felice	German
SF DRS	Marc Dietrich	"Nostradamus"	Peter Reber		German
SF DRS	Ils Furbazs	"Da cumpignia"	Marie-Louise Werth		Romansh
TSR	Carol Rich	"Moitié moitié"	Jean-Jacques Egli		French
TSR	Pierre Alain and Atlas	"Les pianos de l'Atlantique"	Pierre Alain		French
TSR	~~Claude Lander~~	~~"Amoureux d'elle"~~	~~Claude Lander~~	~~Alexandre Castel~~	French

The voting consisted of regional public votes which were sent to the three divisions of SRG SSR (SF DRS, TSR, TSI: German-Romansh, French, and Italian speaking, respectively), a press jury, and a jury of music experts. The winner was the song "Moitié, moitié", composed by Jean-Jacques Egli and performed by Carol Rich.

Final — 31 January 1987
R/O	Artist(s)	Song	Regional Juries			Press Jury	Expert Jury	Total	Place
R/O	Artist(s)	Song	DRS	TSR	TSI	Press Jury	Expert Jury	Total	Place
1	Rita Nessi and I Team	"Dimentica"	2	3	1	1	6	13	8
2	Manuela Felice	"Die Liebe ist eine Reise"	5	7	7	6	1	26	4
3	Paolo Monte	"Questa vita"	3	2	5	5	2	17	6
4	Carol Rich	"Moitié, moitié"	10	10	10	7	8	45	1
5	Marc Dietrich	"Nostradamus"	8	6	8	10	7	39	2
6	Gianni Maselli	"I giorni miei"	1	1	3	2	5	12	9
7	Pierre Alain and Atlas	"Les pianos de l'Atlantique"	6	5	6	4	4	25	5
8	Anetta Philip	"Mit Musik bin ich niemals allein"	4	4	2	3	3	16	7
9	Ils Furbazs	"Da cumpignia"	7	8	4	8	10	37	3

== At Eurovision ==
At the Eurovision Song Contest 1987, held at the Centenary Palace in Brussels, the Swiss entry was the twenty-second and last entry of the night following Yugoslavia. For the first time, Switzerland did not send a conductor for their song. At the close of voting, Switzerland had received 26 points in total; finishing in seventeenth place out of twenty-two countries.

=== Voting ===
Each participating broadcaster assembled a jury panel with at least eleven members. The jurors awarded 1-8, 10, and 12 points to their top ten songs.

Points awarded to Switzerland
Score	Country
12 points	
10 points	
8 points	
7 points	Netherlands
6 points	
5 points	Turkey
4 points	Cyprus
3 points	Luxembourg; Yugoslavia
2 points	Iceland
1 point	Denmark; Israel

Points awarded by Switzerland
Score	Country
12 points	Ireland
10 points	Netherlands
8 points	Israel
7 points	Italy
6 points	Norway
5 points	United Kingdom
4 points	Cyprus
3 points	Denmark
2 points	France
1 point	Germany
