= Finland in the Eurovision Song Contest 1987 =

- Eurovision Song Contest 1987
- Participating broadcaster: Yleisradio (Yle)
- Country: Finland
- Selection process: National final
- Selection date: 21 February 1987

Competing entry
- Song: "Sata salamaa"
- Artist: Vicky Rosti
- Songwriters: Petri Laaksonen; Veli-Pekka Lehto

Placement
- Final result: 15th, 32 points

Participation chronology

Finland was represented at the Eurovision Song Contest 1987 with the song "Sata salamaa", composed by Petri Laaksonen, with lyrics by Veli-Pekka Lehto, and performed by Vicky Rosti. The Finnish participating broadcaster, Yleisradio (Yle), selected its entry in the contest through a national final.

== Before Eurovision ==
=== National final ===
Yleisradio (Yle) invited ten composers for the competition. The Finnish national final was held on 21 February 1987 at its studios in Helsinki. It was hosted by Finland's two previous Eurovision entrants, Laila Halme and Lasse Mårtenson. For the first time in three years, a national postcard poll decided the winner. The results were announced on 13 March 1987, and the winning entry was "Sata salamaa", performed by Vicky Rosti and composed by Petri Laaksonen and Veli-Pekka Lehto.

Final – 21 February 1987
R/O	Artist	Song	Songwriter(s)	Televote	Place
1	Matti Esko	"Isäni maa"	Veikko Samuli; Juha Vainio	4,513	6
2	Leena Nilsson	"Ei yhtään laivaa"	Matti Puurtinen; Timo Hämäläinen	1,074	9
3	Kisu	"Kiitos ja anteeks!"	Kisu Jernström; Impi Riimi	1,001	10
4	Vicky Rosti	"Sata salamaa"	Petri Laaksonen; VeePee Lehto	16,935	1
5	Jorma Kääriäinen	"Tuuli soittaa"	Mika Siekkinen; Kari Kuivalainen	2,589	7
6	Paula Koivuniemi and Viljaset	"Musiikki on niinku se on"	Esa Nieminen; Juha Vainio	8,753	3
7	Johnny Lee Michaels	"Kesätuuli"	Pertti Neumann	15,369	2
8	Jussi Halme and Helena Miller	"Hei, me lennetään"	Jussi Halme; Mika Sundqvist	4,925	5
9	Leena Nilsson Family	"Eilinen uudelleen"	Kari Kuivalainen	1,383	8
10	Tauski and Co.	"Communication"	Roni Kamras; Risto Asikainen	7,294	4

== At Eurovision ==
Rosti performed eighteenth on the night of the contest, following Cyprus and preceding Denmark. While at Brussels, she was credited as "Vicky Rosti" and performed with the band Boulevard, neither of which she did at the national final. At the close of the voting it had received 32 points, placing 15th in a record-setting field of 22 competing countries.

=== Voting ===
Points awarded to Finland
Score	Country
12 points	
10 points	Norway
8 points	Netherlands
7 points	
6 points	
5 points	
4 points	Portugal
3 points	Sweden
2 points	Luxembourg; Spain
1 point	Germany; Greece; Yugoslavia

Points awarded by Finland
Score	Country
12 points	Ireland
10 points	Germany
8 points	Denmark
7 points	Israel
6 points	Cyprus
5 points	Norway
4 points	Italy
3 points	Belgium
2 points	Netherlands
1 point	United Kingdom
