= Yugoslavia in the Eurovision Song Contest 1987 =

- Eurovision Song Contest 1987
- Participating broadcaster: Jugoslavenska radiotelevizija (JRT)
- Country: Yugoslavia
- Selection process: Jugovizija 1987
- Selection date: 7 March 1987

Competing entry
- Song: "Ja sam za ples"
- Artist: Novi fosili
- Songwriters: Rajko Dujmić; Stevo Cvikić

Placement
- Final result: 4th, 92 points

Participation chronology

Yugoslavia was represented at the Eurovision Song Contest 1987 with the song "Ja sam za ples", composed by Rajko Dujmić, with lyrics by Stevo Cvikić, and performed by the band Novi fosili. The Yugoslav participating broadcaster, Jugoslavenska radiotelevizija (JRT), selected its entry through Jugovizija 1987. The selection process used a revised system for nominations and scoring. In the Contest itself the song was ranked fourth out of 22, winning 92 points.

== Before Eurovision ==
=== Jugovizija 1987 ===
The Yugoslav national final to select their entry for the Eurovision Song Contest was held on 7 March 1987 at the Sava Centre in Belgrade, and was hosted by Dejan Đurović and Ivana Stanković.

In 1987, new procedures were introduced about the selection of the songs and voting: all TV studios nominated two songs as guaranteed participants (a total of 16) and 8 more were selected based on their quality. Some of the studios did not enter any extra songs chosen, while TV Zagreb entered four, making six in total. The total of 24 songs competing was the greatest number for the period 1981-1991. The new voting system allowed the juries of the individual TV studios to be able to vote for their own entries, and most of them took this opportunity, as they did in the following four years. Every jury member (3 from each TV studio – 24 in total) could vote only for five songs, and this marginalized many of the songs, with five songs failing to win any points.

The winning entry was "Ja sam za ples", performed by Novi fosili, composed by Rajko Dujmić and written by Stevo Cvikić.

Final – 7 March 1987
R/O	Broadcaster	Artist	Song	Points	Place
1	RTV Ljubljana	Hazard	"Nocoj"	0	20
2	RTV Titograd	Makadam	"Usne od nara"	1	18
3	RTV Ljubljana	Moulin Rouge	"Bye Bye Baby"	26	6
4	RTV Skopje	Kaliopi	"Emanuel"	19	10
5	RTV Novi Sad	Suzana Perović	"U meni vatru ugasi"	0	20
6	RTV Ljubljana	Big Ben	"Moja Marie"	5	17
7	RTV Belgrade	Tereza Kesovija	"Ko mi je kriv"	46	3
8	RTV Pristina	Violeta Rexhepagiqi	"Nuk te haroj"	0	20
9	RTV Zagreb	Grupa 777	"Spavaj samo spavaj"	7	15
10	RTV Zagreb	Novi fosili	"Ja sam za ples"	74	1
11	RTV Novi Sad	Crveni koralji	"Dovoljno je"	1	18
12	RTV Titograd	Daniel and Ana Sasso	"Oprosti mi"	12	12
13	RTV Zagreb	Josipa Lisac	"Gdje Dunav ljubi nebo"	24	8
14	RTV Pristina	Vivien	"Fedora"	10	13
15	RTV Zagreb	Andrea and Tomica Jambrošić	"Poljubi me"	0	20
16	RTV Titograd	Group Familija	"Samo ljubav"	26	6
17	RTV Sarajevo	Hari Mata Hari	"Nebeska kraljica"	8	14
18	RTV Zagreb	Meri Trošelj	"Ludo zelena"	0	20
19	RTV Belgrade	Suzana Mančić	"Vreme nežnosti"	16	11
20	RTV Zagreb	Massimo Savić	"Samo jedan dan"	53	2
21	RTV Skopje	Ana Kostovska	"Anuška"	31	5
22	RTV Belgrade	Bebi Dol	"Zrno nežnosti"	43	4
23	RTV Sarajevo	Seid Memić Vajta	"Opusti se"	6	16
24	RTV Sarajevo	Indexi	"Bila jednom ljubav jedna"	24	8

Entries submitted by broadcaster whose jury members were voting

Detailed Regional Jury Votes
R/O	Song	RTV Pristina			RTV Zagreb			RTV Skopje			RTV Sarajevo			RTV Novi Sad			RTV Belgrade			RTV Titograd			RTV Ljubljana			Total
1	"Nocoj"																									0
2	"Usne od nara"						1																			1
3	"Bye Bye Baby"	3	1														2	3		7		5	3	1	1	26
4	"Emanuel"							5	5	7		1								1						19
5	"U meni vatru ugasi"																									0
6	"Moja Marie"										1			1		3										5
7	"Ko mi je kriv"		2	1	3		3				3			2	2	2	7	2	7	5		7				46
8	"Nuk te haroj"																									0
9	"Spavaj samo spavaj"																				5			2		7
10	"Ja sam za ples"	7	7	7	5	7	7	3	2	3			2				3	7	3	2	2	2	2	3		74
11	"Dovoljno je"															1										1
12	"Oprosti mi"			2						1										3	3	3				12
13	"Gdje Dunav ljubi nebo"							1	3				1								1	1	5	5	7	24
14	"Fedora"	1	3	3								3														10
15	"Poljubi me"																									0
16	"Samo ljubav"				1			2	1	2				3	1								7	7	2	26
17	"Nebeska kraljica"						3							5												8
18	"Ludo zelena"																									0
19	"Vreme nežnosti"	5	5	5		1																				16
20	"Samo jedan dan"				7	5	5				7	5	7	7	3			5	2							53
21	"Anuška"	2			2			7	7	5					5		1	1	1							31
22	"Zrno nežnosti"										2	2	5		7	7	5		5		7				3	43
23	"Opusti se"																						1		5	6
24	"Bila jednom ljubav jedna"					2	2				5	7	3			5										24

== At Eurovision ==
The contest was broadcast on television on: TV Beograd 1, TV Zagreb 1, TV Novi Sad, TV Sarajevo 1, and TV Titograd 1, all with commentary provided by Ksenija Urličić; TV Ljubljana 1 with commentary provided by Vesna Pfeifer; and on TV Koper-Capodistria, TV Prishtina, and TV Skopje 1.

Yugoslavia performed 21st on the night of the contest, following Ireland and preceding Switzerland. At the close of the voting the song had received 92 points, placing 4th in a field of 22 competing countries. The 12 points from the Yugoslav jury were awarded to Italy.

The members of the Yugoslav jury included Fedor Janušić, Valentina Miovska, Ljubiša Terzić, Vera Županić, Ljiljana Ljolja, Mirjana Vukčević, Karolina Savić, Branislav Kitanović, Dušan Cincar, Dimitrije Savić, and Slobodanka Veselinović.

=== Voting ===
Points awarded to Yugoslavia
Score	Country
12 points	Norway; Turkey
10 points	Cyprus; Iceland
8 points	Austria; Belgium; Denmark
7 points	Israel
6 points	Portugal; Spain
5 points	
4 points	
3 points	
2 points	France; Greece
1 point	Ireland

Points awarded by Yugoslavia
Score	Country
12 points	Italy
10 points	Cyprus
8 points	Netherlands
7 points	Germany
6 points	Ireland
5 points	Greece
4 points	Belgium
3 points	Switzerland
2 points	United Kingdom
1 point	Finland

=== Controversy ===
After the contest, many viewers in Yugoslavia criticized the Yugoslav jury, believing its votes had contributed to Novi Fosili finishing fourth rather than achieving a higher placing. Jury member Slobodanka Veselinović rejected the accusations, explaining that Eurovision rules required jurors to score each song immediately after its performance and that the results were finalized before the voting began. She argued that the jury had no opportunity to adjust its votes according to the standings and that the criticism reflected public disappointment with Yugoslavia's final result rather than any irregularity in the voting process. She stated that the jury members themselves had hoped for a stronger result for Novi Fosili and were disappointed when the Yugoslav votes ultimately confirmed the group's drop from contention for the top positions.
