= Cyprus in the Eurovision Song Contest 1987 =

- Eurovision Song Contest 1987
- Participating broadcaster: Cyprus Broadcasting Corporation (CyBC)
- Country: Cyprus
- Selection process: Internal selection
- Announcement date: 26 January 1987

Competing entry
- Song: "Aspro mavro"
- Artist: Alexia
- Songwriters: Andreas Papapavlou; Maria Papapavlou

Placement
- Final result: 7th, 80 points

Participation chronology

Cyprus was represented at the Eurovision Song Contest 1987 with the song "Aspro mavro", written by Andreas Papapavlou, with lyrics by Maria Papapavlou, and performed by Alexia. The Cypriot participating broadcaster, the Cyprus Broadcasting Corporation (CyBC), internally selected its entry for the contest.

== Before Eurovision ==
=== Internal selection ===
The Cyprus Broadcasting Corporation (CyBC) announced it would participate in the Eurovision Song Contest 1987 on 4 November 1986, and on the same day opened a submission period for Cypriot artists and composers to submit songs until 10 January 1987. Conflicting sources claim that between 59 and 61 submissions had been received.

The internal selection was held on 26 January 1987 in a CyBC studio in Nicosia. The results were decided by an 18-member jury consisting of CyBC employees and people in the music industry, although conflicting reports claimed there was a 19-member jury. The selection consisted of several stages and lasted over ten hours, from around 9:00 EET until 19:20 EET. In the last stage, only two songs remained and each jury member had one vote to give to one song. The results of the internal selection were announced immediately after the internal selection in a news broadcast.

It is known that composers Philippos Nikolaidis, George Theofanous, and Andreas Christou, had submitted songs to the internal selection.

Internal selection final stage - 26 January 1987
Artist	Song	Songwriter(s)	Votes	Place
Alexia	"Aspro mavro" (Άσπρο μαύρο)	Andreas Papapavlou; Maria Papapavlou	12	1
Dimitris Christodoulidis		Dimitris Christodoulidis	6	2

Jury members
- Christodoulos Achilleoudis – music inspector for Secondary Education
- Vasos Argyridis – composer
- Lakis Charalambous – musician and singer
- Themis Christodoulou – former head of music programmes at CyBC
- Antonis Christoforidis – sound engineer at CyBC
- Barry Evangeli – disc jockey
- Martyn Ford – arranger
- Chloe Ioannidou – CyBC music programme officer
- Lygia Konstantinidou – senior manager of music programmes at CyBC
- Georgios Kotsonis – music composer
- Marinos Mitellas – music teacher
- Marios Papadopoulos – musician and partner of CyBC
- Fryni Papadopoulou – announcer for CyBC
- Nagia Rousou – CyBC TV programme operator
- Georgios Salachoris – CyBC music programme manager
- Marios Skordis – CyBC TV programme officer
- Michalis Stavridis – music inspector for Primary Education
- Neophytos Taliotis – CyBC TV programme manager

==== Controversy ====
There was some controversy around how the selection was done behind closed doors and no part of the selection was broadcast to the public like had been done in the previous three years. Dimitris Christodoulidis, the runner-up in the selection, wrote a letter to Simerini complaining about the secrecy of the selection. One journalist complained to the general director of CyBC that he was violently removed from the CyBC premises by an employee when trying to get access to the studio where the selection was taking place. Six composers filed separate lawsuits against CyBC, both with the Supreme Court and Nicosia District Court, including Philippos Nikolaidis George Theofanous, Dimitris Christodoulidis, and Andreas Christou. CyBC responded to the complaints, assuring that the selection was carried out objectively according to the regulations of the selection.

== At Eurovision ==
On the night of the final Alexia performed seventeenth in the running order, following Germany and preceding Finland. At the close of voting "Aspro mavro" had received 80 points, placing Cyprus 7th out of 22 countries. The Cypriot jury awarded its 12 points to Greece.

=== Voting ===
Points awarded to Cyprus
Score	Country
12 points	Greece
10 points	Denmark; Yugoslavia
8 points	Ireland
7 points	
6 points	Finland; Iceland; Norway; United Kingdom
5 points	France
4 points	Switzerland
3 points	Germany
2 points	Netherlands; Sweden
1 point	

Points awarded by Cyprus
Score	Country
12 points	Greece
10 points	Yugoslavia
8 points	Ireland
7 points	Sweden
6 points	Germany
5 points	Belgium
4 points	Switzerland
3 points	Norway
2 points	United Kingdom
1 point	Italy
