= Netherlands in the Eurovision Song Contest 1987 =

- Eurovision Song Contest 1987
- Participating broadcaster: Nederlandse Omroep Stichting (NOS)
- Country: Netherlands
- Selection process: Artist: Internal selection Song: Nationaal Songfestival 1987
- Selection date: 25 March 1987

Competing entry
- Song: "Rechtop in de wind"
- Artist: Marcha
- Songwriter: Peter Koelewijn

Placement
- Final result: 5th, 83 points

Participation chronology

The Netherlands was represented at the Eurovision Song Contest 1987 with the song "Rechtop in de wind", written by Peter Koelewijn, and performed by Marcha. The Dutch participating broadcaster, Nederlandse Omroep Stichting (NOS), selected its entry for the contest through a national final, after having previously selected the performer internally.

== Before Eurovision ==
=== Nationaal Songfestival 1987 ===
Nederlandse Omroep Stichting (NOS) held the national final on 25 March 1987 at the Koninklijk Conservatorium in the Hague, hosted by Astrid Joosten. Six songs, all performed by Marcha, took part, with the winner being decided by juries in the twelve Dutch provinces, who each awarded a minimum of 5 points and a maximum of 30 points per song. "Rechtop in de wind" emerged an easy victor, the outright choice of nine of the juries, with a winning points margin of almost twice the number separating the other five songs.

Final – 25 March 1987
R/O	Song	Points	Place
1	"Verliefd zijn"	191	4
2	"Big Ben of Nôtre Dame"	213	2
3	"Rechtop in de wind"	296	1
4	"Morgen"	208	3
5	"Het leven is een cadeau"	170	6
6	"Buiten jou"	182	5

Detailed Regional Jury Votes
R/O	Song	Zeeland	North Brabant	Groningen	Limburg	Drenthe	North Holland	Gelderland	Utrecht	Friesland	Flevoland	South Holland	Overijssel	Total
1	"Verliefd zijn"	20	19	13	15	19	11	12	11	24	5	23	19	191
2	"Big Ben of Nôtre Dame"	17	21	16	14	18	16	28	21	20	14	8	20	213
3	"Rechtop in de wind"	20	17	25	26	25	30	18	29	27	28	24	27	296
4	"Morgen"	20	28	13	24	16	12	16	16	15	21	17	10	208
5	"Het leven is een cadeau"	15	9	18	15	18	11	11	17	10	17	13	16	170
6	"Buiten jou"	13	11	20	11	9	25	20	11	9	20	20	13	182

== At Eurovision ==
On the night of the final Marcha performed 12th in the running order, following Greece and preceding Luxembourg. At the close of voting "Rechtop in de wind" had received 83 points from 14 countries, placing the Netherlands 5th of the 22 entries, their first top 5 finish since 1980. The Dutch jury awarded its 12 points to Ireland.

The Dutch conductor at the contest was Rogier van Otterloo for the fifth and last time, only a few months before his death in January 1988.

The contest was broadcast on Nederland 1, with commentary by Willem van Beusekom.

The members of the Dutch jury included Ruud van den Bosch, Rixt Hilverda, Chantal Keijzer, Mylène Höhle, Fred Jonker, Simone Albers, John van Suijlekom, Ton Snijders, Arend van de Werf, René Pauli, and Ditta de Vroed.

=== Voting ===
Points awarded to the Netherlands
Score	Country
12 points	France
10 points	Italy; Switzerland
8 points	Luxembourg; Yugoslavia
7 points	Turkey
6 points	Ireland
5 points	Israel; Spain
4 points	
3 points	Greece; United Kingdom
2 points	Austria; Denmark; Finland
1 point	

Points awarded by the Netherlands
Score	Country
12 points	Ireland
10 points	Germany
8 points	Finland
7 points	Switzerland
6 points	Denmark
5 points	Greece
4 points	Norway
3 points	Israel
2 points	Cyprus
1 point	France
