= Shir Habatlanim =

1987 song by Lazy Bums

Single by Lazy Bums
- Language: Hebrew
- Released: 1987
- Songwriter: Zohar Laskov

Eurovision Song Contest 1987 entry
- Country: Israel
- Artists: Avi Kushnir; Natan Datner
- As: Lazy Bums
- Language: Hebrew
- Composer: Zohar Laskov
- Lyricist: Zohar Laskov
- Conductor: Kobi Oshrat

Finals performance
- Final result: 8th
- Final points: 73

Entry chronology
- ◄ "Yavo Yom" (1986)
- "Ben Adam" (1988) ►

"Shir Habatlanim" (Hebrew script: שיר הבטלנים; "The Bums' Song") is a song performed by the comedic duo Lazy Bums (Hebrew: הבטלנים, romanized: HaBatlanim). It represented Israel in the Eurovision Song Contest 1987, finishing 8th, scoring 73 points. It was the subject of a resignation threat by Yitzhak Navon, the Israeli Minister of Education.

== Music, act, and lyrics ==
The act consisted of two actors, Nathan Datner and Avi Kushnir, dressed in black suits and ties in the style of the Blues Brothers, who performed alone in a talking style presentation, accompanied by a minimalist orchestra score conducted by a similarly attired conductor. The two men danced in unison, with coordinated arm and feet shuffling, walking across the stage which at times descended into chaotic flailing, pulling faces and a handstand. At times they pulled sunglasses perched off their heads down, and concluded their performance by falsely walking away before jumping back at the audience.

The lyrics describe the daily routine of an idle loafer, evidently unemployed, who wakes up in the morning at 10 a.m., and who cannot see the sun because the shutters, and then a block of buildings impedes his view. It describes his routine of making coffee and smoking, and feeding the birds so that they come and sing the "Lazy Bums' Song". It then describes how the lazy guy directs his dog to do the grocery errands, before going for a walk with the dog (accompanied with a pantomimed lifted-leg gesture), and then at the end of the day, having his view of the moon blocked by the buildings. The verses are interspersed with the chorus, a repetition of the nonsense words hupa, hole hupa, hupa hole.

== At Eurovision ==
It was selected to represent Israel after placing first in the 1987 Kdam-Eurovision preliminaries, where it tallied 79 points, defeating fifteen other Israeli artists' entries including as 1978 Eurovision winner Izhar Cohen. About halfway through the qualifying performance, Kushnir had a momentary lapse and forgot some of the lyrics, but recovered almost immediately. This was the largest pre-Eurovision competition to date, presented by Yardena Arazi and Yoram Arbel on April 1, 1987.

At Eurovision, the song was performed second in a field of 22 on the night, following Norway's Kate with "Mitt liv" and preceding Austria's Gary Lux with "Nur noch Gefühl".

== Reception and legacy ==
It was the first time that a satirical comic act had been selected to represent Israel. This raised the ire of the Minister of Education, Yitzhak Navon, who threatened his resignation if the song represented Israel on the night of the contest. Although the performance went ahead, he did not fulfill his threat to resign.

The song went on to achieve success, primarily amongst the younger demographic who appreciated their slapstick style presentation, especially in Iceland, where the duo later toured and performed live and in television shows. An English version of the song was also recorded.

In 1988, Swedish record company manager and later populist politician Bert Karlsson recorded a Swedish cover version entitled "Hoppa Hulle". In 1996, Brazilian children's host Xuxa made a cover of the song "Huppa-Hule", with Brazilian Portuguese lyrics and melody, in her album Tô de bem com a vida.
