= Norway in the Eurovision Song Contest 1987 =

- Eurovision Song Contest 1987
- Participating broadcaster: Norsk rikskringkasting (NRK)
- Country: Norway
- Selection process: Melodi Grand Prix 1987
- Selection date: 28 February 1987

Competing entry
- Song: "Mitt liv"
- Artist: Kate Gulbrandsen
- Songwriters: Rolf Løvland; Hanne Krogh

Placement
- Final result: 9th, 65 points

Participation chronology

Norway was represented at the Eurovision Song Contest 1987 with the song "Mitt liv", written by Rolf Løvland and Hanne Krogh, and performed by Kate Gulbrandsen. The Norwegian participating broadcaster, Norsk rikskringkasting (NRK), selected its entry through the Melodi Grand Prix 1987.

== Before Eurovision ==
=== Melodi Grand Prix 1987 ===
Norsk rikskringkasting (NRK) held the Melodi Grand Prix 1987 on 28 February 1987 at the Château Neuf in Oslo, hosted by Eldbjørg Vaage. Ten songs took part in the final, with the winner chosen by voting from seven regional juries. Other participants included Finn Kalvik (who represented Norway in 1981) and Tor Endresen, making the first of seven appearances at Melodi Grand Prix before finally being successful on his eighth attempt in 1997.

Final – 28 February 1987
R/O	Artist	Song	Songwriter(s)	Points	Place
1	Tor Endresen and Thowsen Band	"Hemmelig drøm"	Knut Koppang	27	9
2	Egil Eldøen	"Til kvarandre"	Per Røise	13	10
3	Kjersti Bergesen	"Go-go"	Harald Græsdahl; Kjersti Bergesen; Tore Holm	54	3
4	Sigvart Dagsland	"I samme båt"	Amund Enger; Erik Hillestad	38	7
5	Håkon Iversen	"Mange millioner"	Håkon Iversen; Kaj Jordahl	56	2
6	Kate Gulbrandsen	"Mitt liv"	Rolf Løvland; Hanne Krogh	60	1
7	Olav Stedje	"Snurra på barten"	Jonas Fjeld; Ingvar Moe	40	5
8	Catwalk	"Dialog"	Tore Aas; Eyvind Skeie	40	5
9	Finn Kalvik	"Malene"	Finn Kalvik	42	4
10	Frank Aleksandersen	"Tru mæ"	Frank Aleksandersen; Tore Hansen	36	8

Detailed Regional Jury Votes
R/O	Song	Trondheim	Bergen	Elverum	Stavanger	Tromsø	Oslo	Kristiansand	Total
1	"Hemmelig drøm"	5	6	2	2	2	7	3	27
2	"Til kvarandre"	2	1	1	1	6	1	1	13
3	"Go-go"	3	7	12	12	10	8	2	54
4	"I samme båt"	7	4	3	7	8	2	7	38
5	"Mange millioner"	12	8	7	10	1	12	6	56
6	"Mitt liv"	10	12	8	5	3	10	12	60
7	"Snurra på barten"	4	10	5	4	7	5	5	40
8	"Dialog"	1	3	10	6	12	4	4	40
9	"Malene"	6	5	4	8	5	6	8	42
10	"Tru mæ"	8	2	6	3	4	3	10	36

== At Eurovision ==
On the night of the final Gulbrandsen performed first in the running order, preceding Israel. At the close of voting "Mitt liv" had picked up 65 points (the highest a 10 from Sweden), placing Norway 9th of the 22 entries. The Norwegian jury awarded its 12 points to Yugoslavia.

=== Voting ===
Points awarded to Norway
Score	Country
12 points	
10 points	Sweden
8 points	
7 points	Belgium; Germany; Italy
6 points	Switzerland
5 points	Finland
4 points	Austria; France; Netherlands
3 points	Cyprus; Denmark; Spain
2 points	Ireland
1 point	

Points awarded by Norway
Score	Country
12 points	Yugoslavia
10 points	Finland
8 points	Ireland
7 points	Denmark
6 points	Cyprus
5 points	Belgium
4 points	Iceland
3 points	Germany
2 points	Israel
1 point	France
