= Sweden in the Eurovision Song Contest 1987 =

- Eurovision Song Contest 1987
- Participating broadcaster: Sveriges Television (SVT)
- Country: Sweden
- Selection process: Melodifestivalen 1987
- Selection date: 21 February 1987

Competing entry
- Song: "Boogaloo"
- Artist: Lotta Engberg
- Songwriters: Mikael Wendt; Christer Lundh

Placement
- Final result: 12th, 50 points

Participation chronology

Sweden was represented at the Eurovision Song Contest 1987 with the song "Boogaloo", composed by Mikael Wendt, with lyrics by Christer Lundh, and performed by Lotta Engberg. The Swedish participating broadcaster, Sveriges Television (SVT), selected its entry through Melodifestivalen 1987.

The original lyrics of the song, including its title "Fyra Bugg och en Coca-Cola", with which it won the Melodifestivalen, were changed for Eurovision at the request of the European Broadcasting Union, as two trademarks were mentioned.

== Before Eurovision ==
=== Melodifestivalen 1987 ===
Melodifestivalen 1987 was the selection for the 27th song to represent Sweden at the Eurovision Song Contest. It was the 26th time that this system of picking a song had been used. 1,502 songs were submitted to Sveriges Television (SVT) for the competition. The final was held in Lisebergshallen in Gothenburg on 21 February 1987, was presented by Fredrik Belfrage and broadcast on TV1 and was not broadcast on radio. The winning song's lyrics –and title– were changed for the Eurovision Song Contest as it mentioned two trademarks: chewing gum brand Bugg and soft drink brand Coca-Cola.

R/O	Artist	Song	Songwriter(s)	Result
1	Sound of Music	"Alexandra"	Peter Grönvall; Angelique Widengren; Nanne Nordqvist	Qualified
2	Annica Jonsson	"Nya illusioner"	Mikael Wendt och Christer Lundh	—N/a
3	Cyndee Peters	"När morgonstjärnan brinner"	Bobby Ljunggren; Håkan Almqvist; Ingela 'Pling' Forsman	Qualified
4	Paul Sahlin and Anne Kihlström	"Ung och evig"	Paul Sahlin; Alf Brink	—N/a
5	Jan-Eric Karlzon	"Flyktingen"	Jan-Eric Karlzon; Kenth Larsson	—N/a
6	Baden-Baden	"Leva livet"	Anders Nylander; Margareta Karlsson	—N/a
7	Arja Saijonmaa	"Högt över havet"	Lasse Holm	Qualified
8	Robert Wells	"Sommarnatt"	Göran Folkestad; Jan-Olov Ståhl	—N/a
9	Style	"Hand i hand"	Christer Sandelin; Tommy Ekman	Qualified
10	Lena Philipsson	"Dansa i neon"	Tim Norell; Peo Thyrén; Ola Håkansson	Qualified
11	Anna Book	"Det finns en morgondag"	Jan Askelind; Ingela 'Pling' Forsman	—N/a
12	Lotta Engberg	"Fyra Bugg och en Coca Cola"	Mikael Wendt; Christer Lundh	Qualified

Artist	Song	Points	Place
Sound of Music	"Alexandra"	44	4
Cyndee Peters	"När morgonstjärnan brinner"	46	3
Arja Saijonmaa	"Högt över havet"	58	2
Style	"Hand i hand"	29	6
Lena Philipsson	"Dansa i neon"	43	5
Lotta Engberg	"Fyra Bugg och en Coca Cola"	59	1

Voting
Song	15–20	20–25	25–30	30–35	35–40	40–45	45–50	50–55	55–60	Total
"Alexandra"	10	1	10	6	8	4	2	1	2	44
"När morgonstjärnan brinner"	6	10	4	4	1	1	8	6	6	46
"Högt över havet"	8	2	2	8	6	8	10	10	4	58
"Hand i hand"	1	8	1	2	2	6	4	4	1	29
"Dansa i neon"	4	4	8	10	4	2	1	2	8	43
"Fyra Bugg och en Coca Cola"	2	6	6	1	10	10	6	8	10	59

== At Eurovision ==
As the song mentioned the trademark brands Coca-Cola and the Swedish chewing gum Bugg, the European Broadcasting Union demanded that the lyrics be changed before the Eurovision final, so the song was renamed "Boogaloo". It was drawn to perform at start position 12. After the voting, Sweden had received 50 points and finished in 12th place (out of 22). This was the worst placement for Sweden in eight years.

=== Voting ===
Points awarded to Sweden
Score	Country
12 points	Israel
10 points	
8 points	Iceland
7 points	Cyprus; Denmark; Portugal
6 points	
5 points	
4 points	
3 points	France; Italy
2 points	Turkey
1 point	Belgium

Points awarded by Sweden
Score	Country
12 points	Ireland
10 points	Norway
8 points	Denmark
7 points	Germany
6 points	Greece
5 points	United Kingdom
4 points	Israel
3 points	Finland
2 points	Cyprus
1 point	Italy
