= Israel in the Eurovision Song Contest 1987 =

- Eurovision Song Contest 1987
- Participating broadcaster: Israel Broadcasting Authority (IBA)
- Country: Israel
- Selection process: Kdam Eurovision 1987
- Selection date: 1 April 1987

Competing entry
- Song: "Shir Habatlanim"
- Artist: Datner and Kushnir
- Songwriter: Zohar Laskov

Placement
- Final result: 8th, 73 points

Participation chronology

Israel was represented at the Eurovision Song Contest 1987 with the song "Shir Habatlanim", written by Zohar Laskov, and performed by Datner and Kushnir. The Israeli participating broadcaster, the Israel Broadcasting Authority (IBA), selected its entry for the contest through Kdam Eurovision 1987.

== Before Eurovision ==
=== Kdam Eurovision 1987 ===
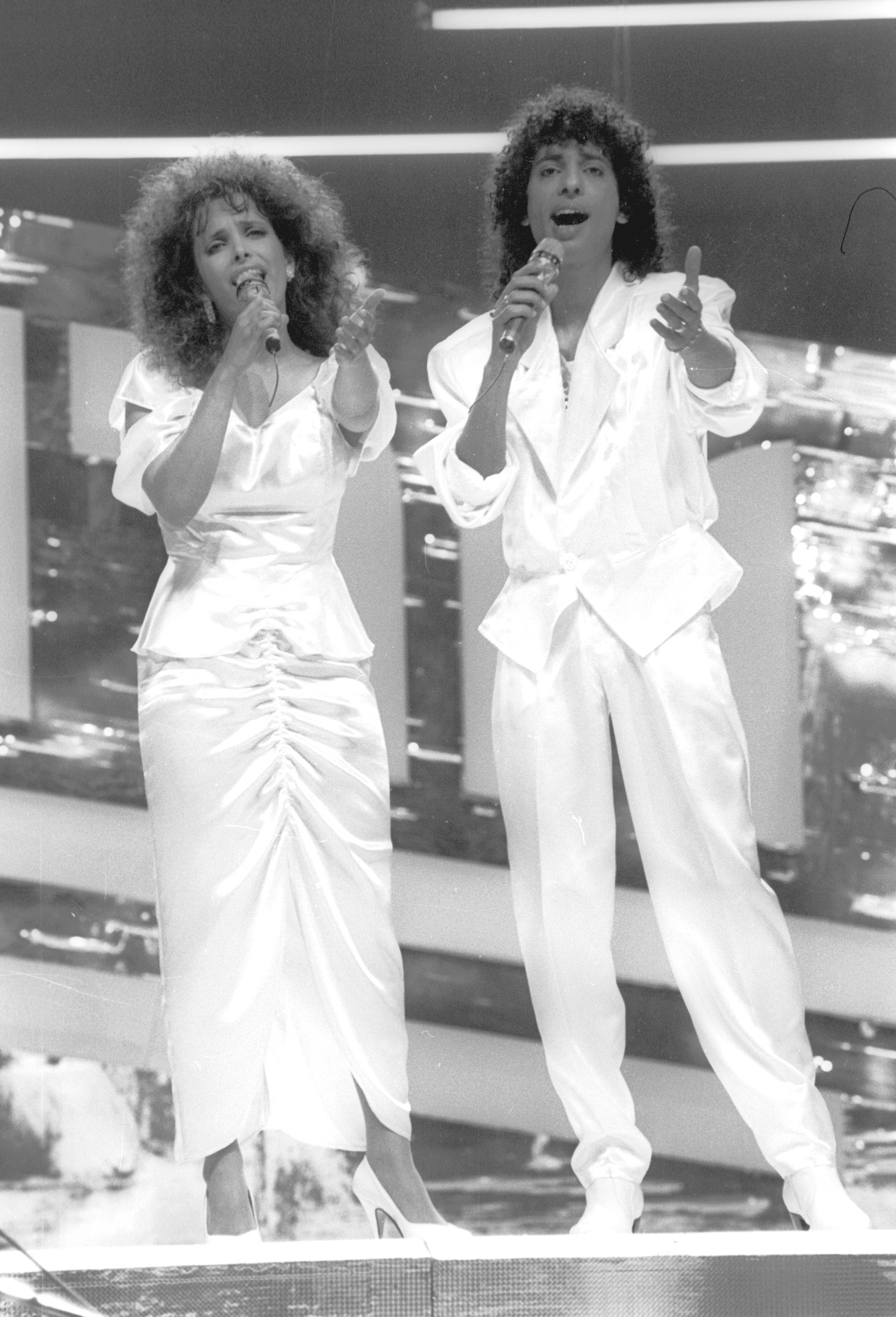
Izhar Cohen with his sister Vardina, during the Kdam Eurovision 1987

The 1987 edition of the Kdam Eurovision was the largest edition of the contest up to that point. Sixteen songs were in contention to represent Israel in Belgium, and rather than only use the votes of regional jury panels as was standard procedure, five of them were joined by three televoting regions and a vote of the audience watching the show in the auditorium. Said auditorium was the Cinerama in Tel Aviv, which marked the first time that the Israeli selection took place outside of Jerusalem. The final was held on 1 April 1987, with co-hosts Yardena Arazi (a former Eurovision co-host and contestant in her own right, whom the IBA would select as its international representative again the following year) and presenter Yoram Arbel. For the first time since the 1979 heats, an orchestra was present, with each composition's respective arranger leading the orchestra. However, according to Kobi Oshrat (the conductor and arranger behind several entries that year, including the eventual winner), all the music had been pre-recorded, and the musicians in the pit were miming, as the IBA did not have the budget for effective sound quality.

Among the competitors was Izhar Cohen, who had previously scored Israel's first Eurovision victory with the song "A-Ba-Ni-Bi" in 1978 and later earned them a fifth-place finish in 1985 with "Ole, Ole". He was joined here by his sister, fellow singer Vardina Cohen. Also making an early appearance were Moshe and Orna Datz, better known as Duo Datz, who would go on to win the 1991 national final and finish third in Eurovision 1991 with the song "Kan". Also competing, as he had in several prior selections, was Svika Pick, who would later write "Diva" with Yoav Ginai and help Dana International secure Israel's third Eurovision win eleven years later. Dafna Dekel, who represented Israel in 1992 with the song "Ze Rak Sport" and co-hosted the 1999 contest, appeared here as a member of Dorit & Friends.

The voting was close, with few points separating the top four songs. However, to great surprise, it was Datner and Kushnir's novelty song "Shir Habatlanim", an ode to the virtues of an easygoing life sung by the duo in Blues Brothers-inspired outfits, that took the lead by thirteen points over frequent national finalist Ilana Avital and earned the right to fly the Israeli flag in Brussels. As one of many apocryphal stories regarding Israel's Eurovision history goes, the Minister of Culture (later clarified to be Yitzhak Navon) threatened to resign if the duo remained the Israeli representatives. They did, and he did not.

Final – 1 April 1987
R/O	Artist	Song	Conductor	Points	Place
1	Arik Sinai and Brur-Chail Group	"Lahzor ha'bayta" (לחזור הביתה)	Yoram Zadok	29	8
2	Ilana Avital	"Dai li dai" (די לי די)	Kobi Oshrat	66	2
3	Dudu Fisher	"Kinor" (כינור)	Ronny Weiss	35	7
4	Lahakat Shir	"Shir" (שיר)	David Krivoshei	55	6
5	Yaron Chadad	"Ulay halayla" (אולי הלילה)	Eldad Shrem	1	16
6	Vardina and Izhar Cohen	"Musica hi neshika la'netzach" (מוזיקה היא נשיקה לנצח)	Ronny Weiss	59	5
7	Haim Moshe	"Eretz ahuva" (ארץ אהובה)	Nansi Brandes	13	12
8	Orna and Moshe Datz	"Cupidon" (קופידון)	Ilan Gilboa	63	4
9	Dorit and Friends	"Yerushalem" (ירושלם)	Nansi Brandes	16	9
10	Etti Ankri	"Nostalgia" (נוסטלגיה)	David Krivoshei	3	14
11	Daliah Cohen and the Guys from Afikim	"Hey hopa" (היי הופה)	David Krivoshei	3	14
12	Svika Pick	"Domino" (דומינו)	David Krivoshei	14	10
13	Gitit Shoval	"Ha'klik" (הקליק)	David Krivoshei	14	10
14	Miki Kam	"Kazino olami" (קזינו עולמי)	Kobi Oshrat	65	3
15	Israela Krovoshey	"Airobica" (אירוביקה)	David Krivoshei	7	13
16	Natan Datner and Avi Kushnir	"Shir Habatlanim" (שיר הבטלנים)	Kobi Oshrat	79	1

Detailed Votes
R/O	Song	Beersheba	Petah Tikva	Acre	Rishon LeZion	Kibbutz Maoz Haim	Jerusalem	Or Yehuda	Cinerama	Haifa	Total
1	"Lahzor ha'bayta"			3	5	6	2	4	6	3	29
2	"Dai li dai"	8	10	7	8	4	12	6	10	1	66
3	"Kinor"	3	8	2	3		5		7	7	35
4	"Shir"	5	6	5	7	7	6	10	8	4	55
5	"Ulay halayla"							1			1
6	"Musica hi neshika la'netzach"	6	4	8	10	3	10	8	4	6	59
7	"Eretz ahuva"	4	1	4		1	3				13
8	"Cupidon"	7	7	10	6	8	4	7	2	12	63
9	"Yerushalem"		3	1	4			2	1	5	16
10	"Nostalgia"				1					2	3
11	"Hey hopa"								3		3
12	"Domino"	2						12			14
13	"Ha'klik"	1			2	10	1				14
14	"Kazino olami"	12	12	12		5	8		8	8	65
15	"Airobica"		2			2		3			7
16	"Shir habatlanim"	10	5	6	12	12	7	5	12	10	79

== At Eurovision ==
Israel performed second on the night of the contest, following Norway and preceding Austria. Israel placed eighth with 73 points. Israel's jury awarded twelve points to Sweden.

=== Voting ===
Points awarded to Israel
Score	Country
12 points	
10 points	France; Portugal
8 points	Germany; Switzerland
7 points	Finland
6 points	Belgium
5 points	Iceland; Ireland
4 points	Sweden; United Kingdom
3 points	Netherlands
2 points	Norway
1 point	Austria

Points awarded by Israel
Score	Country
12 points	Sweden
10 points	United Kingdom
8 points	Germany
7 points	Yugoslavia
6 points	Denmark
5 points	Netherlands
4 points	Ireland
3 points	Italy
2 points	Belgium
1 point	Switzerland
