= Turkey in the Eurovision Song Contest 1987 =

- Eurovision Song Contest 1987
- Participating broadcaster: Turkish Radio and Television Corporation (TRT)
- Country: Turkey
- Selection process: 11. Eurovision Şarkı Yarışması Türkiye Finali
- Selection date: 21 February 1987

Competing entry
- Song: "Şarkım Sevgi Üstüne"
- Artist: Seyyal Taner and Grup Lokomotif
- Songwriter: Olcayto Ahmet Tuğsuz

Placement
- Final result: 22nd, 0 points

Participation chronology

Turkey was represented at the Eurovision Song Contest 1987 with the song "Şarkım Sevgi Üstüne", written by Olcayto Ahmet Tuğsuz, and performed by Seyyal Taner and Grup Lokomotif. The Turkish participating broadcaster, the Turkish Radio and Television Corporation (TRT), selected its entry through a national final.

== Before Eurovision ==
=== 11. Eurovision Şarkı Yarışması Türkiye Finali ===
The Turkish Radio and Television Corporation (TRT) held the national final on 21 February 1987 at its studios in Ankara, hosted by television presenter and Turkish commentator Bülend Özveren. Ten songs competed and the winner was determined by a sixteen-member jury.

Other participants included past and future Turkish representative MFÖ (1985 and 1988), Arzu Ece (1989 as part of the Grup Pan and 1995) and Kayahan (1990).

Final – 21 February 1987
R/O	Artist	Song	Lyricist	Composer	Conductor	Points	Place
1	Seden Kutlubay, Vedat Sakman & Grup Piramit	"Hayat Pencerenin Dışında"	Nezih Topuzlu	Selmi Andak	Uğur Dikmen	0	3
2	Grup Denk	"Paydos"	Bora Ebeoğlu	Melih Kibar		2	2
3	Grup FM	"Keloğlan"	Selçuk Başar	Selçuk Başar		0	3
4	Kayahan, Emel Müftüoğlu, Erdal Çelik, Yeşim Vatan, Ayşe Özşahin	"Güneşli Bir Resim Çiz Bana"	Kayahan Açar	Kayahan Açar	Ümit Eroğlu	0	3
5	Fatih Erkoç	"Dünya Barışı İçin"	Fatih Erkoç	Fatih Erkoç	Garo Mafyan	0	3
6	Aşkın Nur Yengi, Harun Kolçak & Grup Periyod	"Güzel Şeyler Söyle"	Aysel Gürel	Onno Tunç	Garo Mafyan	0	3
7	MFÖ	"No Problem"	Mazhar Alanson	Mazhar Alanson; Fuat Güner; Özkan Uğur	Turhan Yükseler	0	3
8	Ahmet Özhan	"Gülümse Biraz"	Cansın Erol	Selahattin İçli	Turhan Yükseler	0	3
9	Arzu Ece & Cihan Okan	"Bir Gün Bize Yetmez"	Kayahan Açar	Attila Özdemiroğlu	Turhan Yükseler	0	3
10	Seyyal Taner & Grup Lokomotif	"Şarkım Sevgi Üstüne"	Olcayto Ahmet Tuğsuz	Olcayto Ahmet Tuğsuz	Garo Mafyan	14	1

== At Eurovision ==
On the night of the contest, Turkey performed 10th following Spain and preceding Greece. At the close of voting Turkey had received no points (or, as Eurovision fans refer to the phenomenon, nul points) placing Turkey last out of 22 entries. At the time this was the worst last placing for a country as it was the largest contest. This was also the third time Turkey came last in the contest and the second time they had received zero points. This is the final contest to date in which Turkey finished last.

=== Voting ===
Turkey did not receive any points at the Eurovision Song Contest 1987.

Points awarded by Turkey
Score	Country
12 points	Yugoslavia
10 points	Ireland
8 points	Italy
7 points	Netherlands
6 points	Germany
5 points	Switzerland
4 points	Belgium
3 points	United Kingdom
2 points	Sweden
1 point	Denmark
