= Ireland in the Eurovision Song Contest 1987 =

- Eurovision Song Contest 1987
- Participating broadcaster: Radio Telefís Éireann (RTÉ)
- Country: Ireland
- Selection process: Eurosong '87
- Selection date: 8 March 1987

Competing entry
- Song: "Hold Me Now"
- Artist: Johnny Logan
- Songwriter: Seán Sherrard

Placement
- Final result: 1st, 172 points

Participation chronology

Ireland was represented at the Eurovision Song Contest 1987 with the song "Hold Me Now", written and performed by Johnny Logan. The Irish participating broadcaster, Radio Telefís Éireann (RTÉ), selected its entry through a national final. The entry eventually won the Eurovision Song Contest.

== Before Eurovision ==
=== Eurosong '87 ===
Radio Telefís Éireann (RTÉ) held the national final on 8 March 1987, at the Gaiety Theatre in Dublin, hosted by Marty Whelan and former Irish Eurovision participant Maxi. Nine songs competed, and the winner was chosen by an "expert" jury, which included Linda Martin, who represented Ireland in 1984 and would do so again in 1992.

R/O	Artist	Song	Points	Place
1	Rosie Hunter	"I'm in a Tizzy"	64	7
2	Jody McStravick	"Louise"	60	8
3	Charlie McGettigan	"Are You Shy"	75	3
4	Valerie Armstrong	"Ó d'imigh tú uaim"	71	4
5	Spyder Sympson	"All My Life"	69	5
6	Loudest Whisper	"Whisper, Whisper"	51	9
7	Paul Duffy	"Every Single Move She Makes"	95	2
8	Jenni Stanley	"You're Not Around"	68	6
9	Johnny Logan	"Hold Me Now"	114	1

Detailed Jury Votes
R/O	Song	Larry Gogan	Twink	Paddy Murray	Lynne Fitzgerald	Brian D'Arcy	Linda Martin	Pete St. John	Eve Jones	Frank McNamara	Michael O'Riordan	Helen Quinn	Jackie Hayden	Total
1	"I'm in a Tizzy"	6	4	4	3	6	6	6	6	5	6	6	6	64
2	"Louise"	5	4	6	4	6	5	5	5	6	5	5	4	60
3	"Are You Shy"	7	5	8	5	8	5	5	8	6	7	5	6	75
4	"Ó d'imigh tú uaim"	6	7	6	4	7	7	7	6	7	5	4	5	71
5	"All My Life"	6	5	6	4	6	6	6	7	7	7	5	4	69
6	"Whisper, Whisper"	5	4	3	2	5	5	6	4	4	7	3	3	51
7	"Every Single Move She Makes"	8	8	8	6	8	9	7	9	9	8	8	7	95
8	"You're Not Around"	6	5	5	4	6	6	6	6	5	7	6	6	68
9	"Hold Me Now"	9	10	10	8	10	10	10	10	10	9	10	8	114

== At Eurovision ==
The Eurovision Song Contest 1987 was held at the Palais du Centenaire, Eeuwfeestpaleis in Brussels, Belgium.

"Hold Me Now" was performed twentieth in the running order on the evening of the contest, following Denmark and preceding Yugoslavia, which meant that Logan performed third last, as he had done seven years earlier. The song went on to win the contest with 172 points, a substantial thirty-one-point margin over Germany.

Although many former winners have returned to perform at the contest, Logan was the only singer to have won the Eurovision Song Contest twice until Loreen in 2023.

The contest was broadcast on RTÉ 1 (with commentary by Marty Whelan) and on radio station RTÉ FM3 (with commentary by Larry Gogan).

=== Voting ===
Points awarded to Ireland
Score	Country
12 points	Austria; Belgium; Finland; Italy; Netherlands; Sweden; Switzerland; United Kingdom
10 points	Luxembourg; Spain; Turkey
8 points	Cyprus; Norway; Portugal
7 points	
6 points	Germany; Yugoslavia
5 points	Denmark
4 points	Israel
3 points	
2 points	
1 point	France

Points awarded by Ireland
Score	Country
12 points	Italy
10 points	France
8 points	Cyprus
7 points	Germany
6 points	Netherlands
5 points	Israel
4 points	Denmark
3 points	United Kingdom
2 points	Norway
1 point	Yugoslavia

== Congratulations: 50 Years of the Eurovision Song Contest ==
"Hold Me Now" was one of fourteen Eurovision songs chosen by fans to participate in the Congratulations 50th anniversary special in 2005. It was one of two Irish entries, both by Logan, to feature in the show (the other being "What's Another Year").

"Hold Me Now" was drawn to appear twelfth, following "Ne partez pas sans moi" by Celine Dion (the winner after Logan) and preceding "Save Your Kisses for Me" by Brotherhood of Man. Like the majority of performances that evening, it was largely played out with a dance troupe appearing alongside footage of Logan's 1987 performance. Near the end of the performance, Logan appeared and lip-synced the last chorus. At the end of the first round, "Hold Me Now" was announced as one of the songs proceeding to the second round. It was later revealed that "Hold Me Now" finished third, with 182 points.

In the final round, "Hold Me Now" held its third place, with an improved score of 262 points. In both the first and second round, Ireland was able to award themselves twelve points, a practice usually not allowed in standard Eurovision editions.

=== Voting ===
Points awarded to "Hold Me Now" (Round 1)
Score	Country
12 points	Ireland; Macedonia; Malta
10 points	Germany; Greece; Norway; Romania; Serbia and Montenegro
8 points	Croatia
7 points	Cyprus; Denmark; Finland; Netherlands; Slovenia
6 points	Bosnia and Herzegovina; Sweden; Switzerland
5 points	Belgium; Israel; Monaco; Portugal
4 points	Austria; Lithuania
3 points	
2 points	Iceland; Poland; Turkey
1 point	Ukraine

Points awarded to "Hold Me Now" (Round 2)
Score	Country
12 points	Croatia; Ireland; Macedonia; Malta; Portugal; Romania
10 points	Belgium; Denmark; Greece; Netherlands; Norway
8 points	Cyprus; Finland; Germany; Iceland; Israel; Serbia and Montenegro; Slovenia; Sweden
7 points	Austria; Bosnia and Herzegovina; Monaco; Switzerland
6 points	Andorra; Latvia; Lithuania; Poland; Russia; Spain; Turkey; Ukraine
