= Cyndee Peters =

American singer (born 1946)

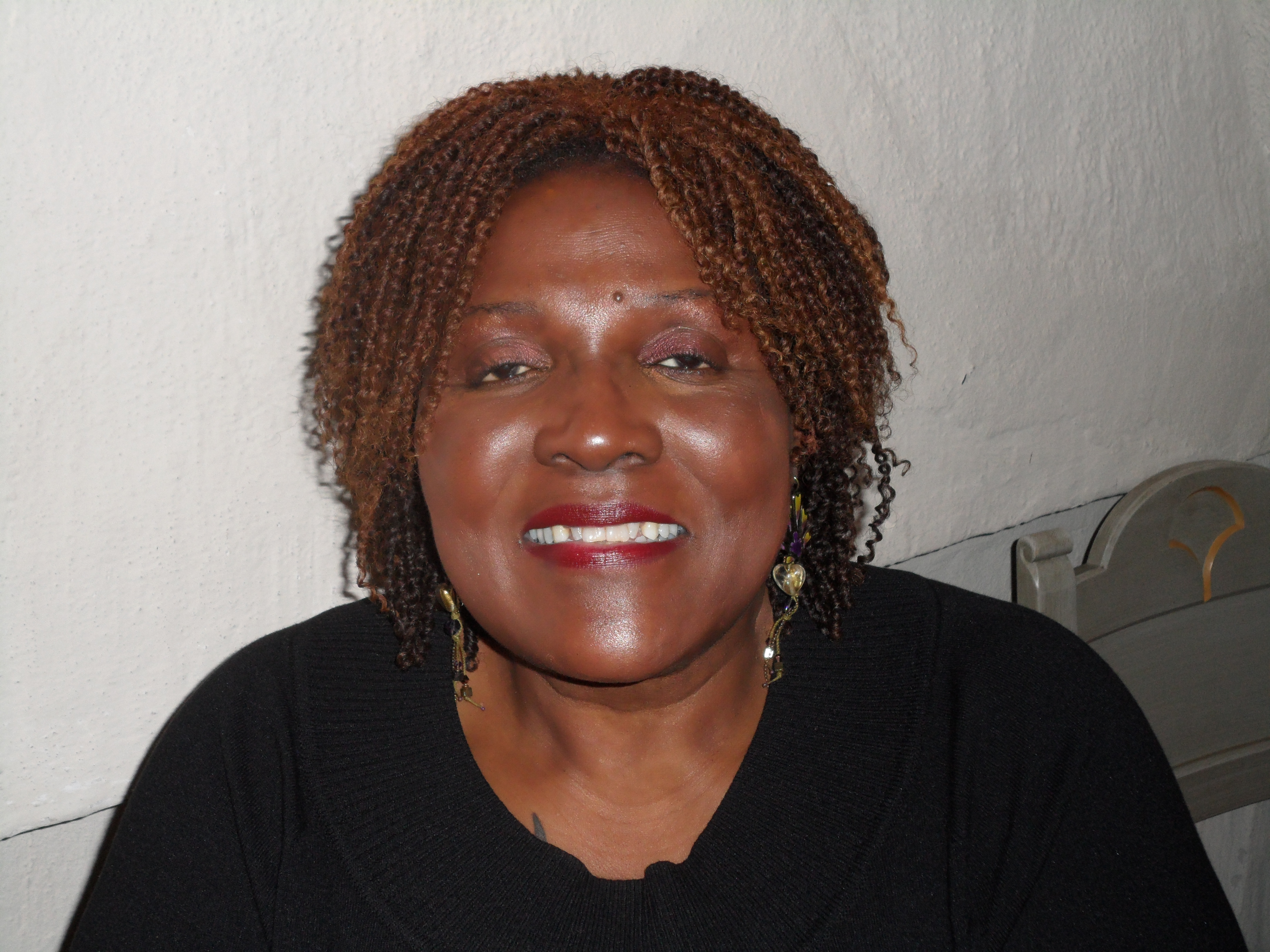
- Peters inside the Backen Church in 2012

Background information
- Birth name: Cynthia Mana Pettice
- Born: September 8, 1946 (age 78); Granite Falls, North Carolina, U.S.
- Genres: Gospel
- Years active: 1973–

Cynthia Mana Pettice Strandell (born September 8, 1946), known professionally as Cyndee Peters, is an American–Swedish gospel singer and author in Sweden. She was born in 1946 in Granite Falls, North Carolina.

In addition to featuring in TV shows and concerts, she has also written two books:

- Timme för Timme, dag för dag (1988); 2nd edition 2005
- Vidare (1994)

In 1987 she came third in the Melodifestivalen, the Swedish selection for the Eurovision Song Contest, with the song När morgonstjärnan brinner.

Over the years she has worked with many artists, including Liza Minnelli and Natalie Cole. She lived in the Swedish town of Sollentuna for many years until moving back to the US in 2011. In 2004 she became an honorary member of the Swedish organisation Vasa Order of America.
