= Carol Rich =

Swiss singer

- Born: Anne-Lyse Caille; 15 February 1962 (age 63); Villorsonnens, Switzerland
- Origin: Villorsonnens, Switzerland
- Genres: Pop, Chanson
- Occupation: Singer
- Website: Carol Rich

Carol Rich (born Anne-Lyse Caille 15 February 1962) is a Swiss singer, best known for her participation in the 1987 Eurovision Song Contest.

After studying classical singing at the Conservatoire de Fribourg, Rich turned towards popular music and in 1984 made her first appearance in the Swiss Eurovision Song Contest selection, where her song "Tokyo Boy" could only manage seventh place, but was moderately successful when released as a single.

Rich returned in 1987, and this time was successful with "Moitié, moitié" ("Half and Half") being chosen as the Swiss entry for the 32nd Eurovision Song Contest, held on 9 April in Brussels. Although "Moitié, moitié" drew the coveted last spot in the performance order, the uptempo song did not prove memorable enough to win over the juries, finishing the evening in 17th place of the 22 entries. Rich entered her final Eurovision selection with "Donner la main" in 1991, finishing fourth.

In 1990, Rich moved to Paris, where she worked with Francis Lai and Roland Romanelli before taking a lengthy career break during which she gave birth to two children. She returned to performing in 1999, now with a mixed repertoire of popular songs, traditional chansons and gospel music. In the 2000s, Rich continues to tour and has released three albums.

== Albums discography ==
- 1990: Longs les Jours
- 2000: Veux-tu vivre avec moi
- 2003: Adieu l'Armailli! (with Patrick Menoud)
- 2006: Si c'était à revivre

Awards and achievements
Preceded by Daniela Simmons with "Pas pour moi"	Switzerland in the Eurovision Song Contest; 1987	Succeeded by Céline Dion with "Ne partez pas sans moi"
