= Germany in the Eurovision Song Contest 1987 =

- Eurovision Song Contest 1987
- Participating broadcaster: ARD (Note: Arbeitsgemeinschaft der öffentlich-rechtlichen Rundfunkanstalten der Bundesrepublik Deutschland) – Bayerischer Rundfunk (BR)
- Country: Germany
- Selection process: Ein Lied für Brüssel
- Selection date: 26 March 1987

Competing entry
- Song: "Laß die Sonne in dein Herz"
- Artist: Wind
- Songwriters: Ralph Siegel; Bernd Meinunger

Placement
- Final result: 2nd, 141 points

Participation chronology

Germany was represented at the Eurovision Song Contest 1987 with the song "Laß die Sonne in dein Herz", composed by Ralph Siegel, with lyrics by Bernd Meinunger, and performed by the band Wind. The German participating broadcaster on behalf of ARD, Bayerischer Rundfunk (BR), selected their entry through a national final. This was the second of three appearances by Wind at Eurovision; they had previously finished second for Germany in 1985 and would return to the contest in 1992. The Eurovision performance included future Milli Vanilli member Rob Pilatus.

== Before Eurovision ==
=== Ein Lied für Brüssel ===
Bayerischer Rundfunk (BR) held the national final on 26 March 1987 at the Frankenhalle in Nuremberg, hosted by Christopher Deumling. Twelve acts presented their entries live and the winner was selected by a panel of approximately 500 people who had been selected as providing a representative cross-section of the German public.

Other participants included the following year's Germany entrants Maxi and Chris Garden, and Michael Hoffmann, who had represented Germany in 1983 as half of Hoffmann & Hoffmann.

Final – 26 March 1987
R/O	Artist	Song	Composer(s)	Points	Place
1	Helen Christie	"Lieder der Freiheit"	Ralph Siegel, Bernd Meinunger	3,059	8
2	Michael Hoffmann	"Ich geb' nicht auf"	Günther Moll, Michael Hoffmann	3,190	5
3	Rouge	"Einer von uns"	Rainer Pietsch, Werner Schüler, Volker Constanz	3,166	6
4	Wind	"Laß die Sonne in dein Herz"	Ralph Siegel, Bernd Meinunger	4,445	1
5	Sandy Derix	"Träume tun weh"	Ralph Siegel, Bernd Meinunger	2,902	11
6	Bernd Schütz Band	"Visionen in der Nacht"	Bernd Schütz, Frank Hoppe	2,929	10
7	Michaela	"Das Licht eines neuen Morgens"	Rainer Pietsch, Bernd Meinunger	3,054	9
8	Bernhard Brink	"So bin ich ohne dich"	Joachim Heider, Gregor Rottschalk	3,355	3
9	Maxi and Chris Garden	"Frieden für die Teddybären"	Ralph Siegel, Bernd Meinunger	4,370	2
10	New Generation	"Viel zu schön"	Bernd Schütz, Frank Hoppe	2,864	12
11	Denise	"Die Frau im Spiegel"	Walter Gerke, Mick Hannes	3,320	4
12	Cassy	"Aus"	Ralph Siegel, Bernd Meinunger	3,126	7

== At Eurovision ==
On the evening of the final Wind performed 16th in the running order, following France and preceding Cyprus. At the close of voting "Laß die Sonne in dein Herz" had received 141 points, placing Germany second of the 22 entries. The German jury awarded its 12 points to Italy.

Wind became the first act, and to date still the only one, to have finished in second place twice at Eurovision.

The contest was broadcast on Erstes Deutsches Fernsehen, with commentary by Lotti Ohnesorge and Christoph Deumling. The show was watched by 10.16 million viewers in Germany.

=== Voting ===
Points awarded to Germany
Score	Country
12 points	Denmark; Iceland
10 points	Austria; Belgium; Finland; Netherlands; United Kingdom
8 points	Israel
7 points	Ireland; Sweden; Yugoslavia
6 points	Cyprus; France; Luxembourg; Turkey
5 points	Portugal
4 points	Italy
3 points	Norway
2 points	
1 point	Spain; Switzerland

Points awarded by Germany
Score	Country
12 points	Italy
10 points	Iceland
8 points	Israel
7 points	Norway
6 points	Ireland
5 points	France
4 points	Belgium
3 points	Cyprus
2 points	Portugal
1 point	Finland
