= Frank Aleksandersen =

Norwegian singer, drummer and lyricist (born 1953)

Frank Aleksandersen (born 30 May 1953, in Namsos) is a Norwegian singer, drummer and lyricist. For a while, he was the drummer for the jazz-inspired band Vanessa. He is the cousin of the trønderrocker Åge Aleksandersen.

As a 17-year-old, he moved to Oslo to become a hairdresser.

== Album releases ==
Frank appeared on the Venessa album City Lips, which was released in 1975. His first solo album as a singer was Tilbake til meg selv, and was a pop album. The album was released in 1979, and was followed with a new album two years later, Krampe. His third album, Frank, came in 1982, and his music returned closer to rock. For while, he recorded under the name Frank Aleksandersen Band. On the album Vi e som vi e, recorded in Trondheim in 1985, he had the help of Åge Aleksandersen, Marius Müller and Jonas Fjeld, among others. In 1991, came the record Rundt i ring, and he now sang in bokmål and eastern dialect in place of trøndersk. This album was also more pop-focussed than previously. In 1995 came the album Det æ har å gi. In 2005, he recorded a new album, Uhørt, in Fagerborg Studio in Oslo.

== Discography ==
- Tilbake til meg selv (EMI, 1979)
- Krampe (EMI, 1981)
- Frank (EMI, 1982)
- Vi e som vi e (Studio B, 1983)
- Stille før stormen (EMI, 1985)
- Rundt i ring (Ringreven, 1991)
- Det æ har å gi (Tylden & Co., 1995)
- Uhørt (2005)
- TBA (2010)

== Melodi Grand Prix record ==
Frank has taken part in the Melodi Grand Prix with the following songs:

- 1982 Vi får, vi gir, vi går, vi blir (3rd place in the Norwegian final)
- 1986 Stille før stormen (7th place in the Norwegian final)
- 1987 Tru mæ (8th place in the Norwegian final)
