= Kate Gulbrandsen =

Norwegian singer (born 1965)

Kate Gulbrandsen (born 6 August 1965 in Slemmestad) is a Norwegian singer. In 1986 she represented Norway at the Yamaha Song Festival in Tokyo with the song "Carnival". She won the Norwegian national final Melodi Grand Prix 1987 in a very close regional vote, giving her the opportunity to compete for Norway at the Eurovision Song Contest 1987 with the song "Mitt liv" (My Life), written by Rolf Løvland and Hanne Krogh. She went on to place ninth overall.

Gulbrandsen tried to represent Norway again in 1989, singing "Nærhet" (Closeness) at the Melodi Grand Prix, although was unplaced. The song was rerecorded by Gulbrandsen in 1991, with a slightly different arrangement.

Her version of Jørn Hansen's "Med gullet for øyet" was the official song of the 1998 Winter Paralympics in Nagano, Japan.

In 2004, after more than ten years away from the Norwegian popular music scene, Kate made a musical comeback in country style with two new tracks reaching Norsktoppen, Norway's main pop chart. These included a new version of the Dolly Parton hit "Jolene", which was included on her 2005 album release "Vi to" (We Two). Kate's "Jolene" spent 11 weeks in Norsktoppen, and was cited as the 8th most popular song of Norsktoppen in 2004.

Today she lives in Hokksund with her daughter Sandra. She is still remembered well as one of Norway's former Eurovision singers, and appeared in the audience at one of the semifinals for the 2009 Melodi Grand Prix contest in Norway, where a tribute to her 1987 participation was shown.

In 2023, she returned to the Norwegian Melodi Grand Prix contest with her song "Tårer i Paradis" (Tears in Paradise). She participated in the first semi-final on 14 January, but ultimately didn't qualify to the final.

== Discography ==
- The Beauty and the Beat (1987)
- Sol om natten (1991)
- Vi to (2005)

Awards and achievements
Preceded by Ketil Stokkan with "Romeo"	Norway in the Eurovision Song Contest; 1987	Succeeded by Karoline Krüger with "For vår jord"
