= Alexia Vassiliou =

Cypriot singer-songwriter

- Αλεξία Βασιλείου
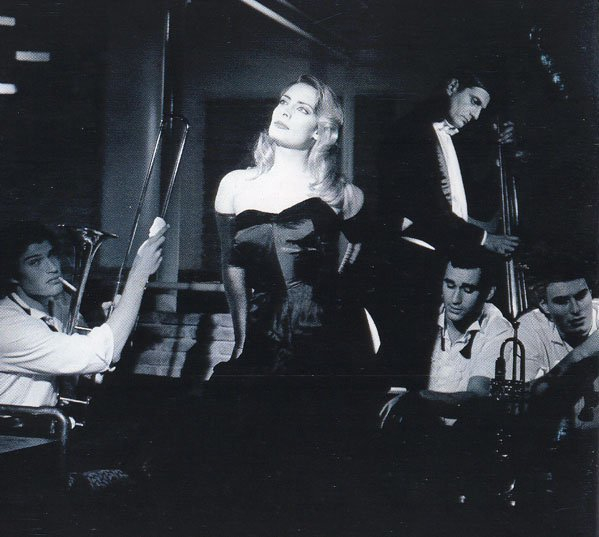
- Born: 5 February 1964 (age 62); Famagusta, Cyprus
- Education: Berklee College of Music
- Occupation: singer
- Known for: 40 years of entertaining including twice at Eurovision

Alexia Vassiliou (Greek: Αλεξία Βασιλείου; born 5 February 1964) is a Cypriot singer-songwriter. She has represented her country in the Eurovision contest in 1981 and 1987. She became a refugee at age ten and still gives concerts for the United Nations High Commissioner for Refugees.

== Life ==
Vassiliou was born in Famagusta in north east Cyprus in 1964. On 14 August 1974 the town was invaded by Turkish forces and she and her family fled the town as refugees. A resolution of the situation of a divided island was abandoned by the United Nations in 2017.

She trained in music in Boston at the Berklee College of music. She was a teenager when she was part of her country's entry in the Eurovision contest in 1981. In 1987 she returned to Eurovision again as Cyprus's entry as a solo singer.

In 1996 one of her many albums included a collaboration with the American musician Chick Corea. In 2013 she returned to the house where she was born and met the elderly couple who live in what was her family's home. She still considers herself a refugee and she has given concert's supported by the interior ministry and the United Nations High Commissioner for Refugees (UNHCR). In 2018 she arranged a course for some of the 100 unaccompanied refugee children living in Cyprus and awaiting asylum. The children attend school but Vassiliou and the UNHCR hope that the course will allow them to reconnect with themselves.

In 2023 the Department of Antiquities of Cyprus's Deputy Ministry of Culture organised a free concert at the Cyprus Museum, in the country's capital of Lefkosia. The concept concert included traditional Cypriot songs as well as jazz tunes. Its theme was the female god Kypris and it was said to be inspired by the museum's contents.
