= United Kingdom in the Eurovision Song Contest 1987 =

- Eurovision Song Contest 1987
- Participating broadcaster: British Broadcasting Corporation (BBC)
- Country: United Kingdom
- Selection process: A Song for Europe 1987
- Selection date: 10 April 1987

Competing entry
- Song: "Only the Light"
- Artist: Rikki
- Songwriter: Richard Peebles

Placement
- Final result: 13th, 47 points

Participation chronology

The United Kingdom was represented at the Eurovision Song Contest 1987 with the song "Only the Light", written and performed by Rikki. The British participating broadcaster, the British Broadcasting Corporation (BBC), selected its entry through a national final.

== Before Eurovision ==
=== A Song for Europe 1987 ===
In a change to previous years, 10 songs were performed instead of the usual eight. None of the performers had ever performed in A Song for Europe before, and none of the writers had ever written for the contest before. As well as Music Publisher's Association selecting some of the songs, songs from record publishers were also submitted. They were selected in the following manner (as recounted by the radio commentator during the interval act): "Around 400 songs were selected by the Music Publisher's Association and the British Phonographic Industries. These songs were reviewed by 10 juries of 6 people, whittling them down to 50 songs. They were down reduced to 20 songs, which were sent to the BBC, and the 10 were chosen by producer Brian Whitehouse, Mike Batt, Bruce Welch, some radio and television producers, and representatives from the MPA and BPI".

==== Final ====
The final was held on 10 April 1987, live from Studio 1 of the BBC Television Centre in London. The contest was hosted by Terry Wogan. It was also broadcast on BBC Radio 2, and this was the first and only instance in which the radio commentator could also be heard on television, passing comment after each song, and during the interval act. The BBC Concert Orchestra under the direction of Ronnie Hazlehurst as conductor accompanied all the songs, but despite performing live, the orchestra were off-screen, behind the set. Hazlehurst's arrangement of the title music which had made its debut the previous year, was an upbeat arrangement of the traditional Te Deum music and was used again for the title sequence. The interval act was a pre-recorded dancing performance by The Anthony Van Laast Dancers.

Nine regional juries located in Birmingham, Cardiff, Manchester, Belfast, Edinburgh, London, Norwich, Newcastle, and Bristol voted for the songs. Juries ranked the songs internally and awarded 15 points to their favourite, 12 to the second, 10 to the third, 9 to the fourth, 8 to the fifth, 7 to the sixth, 6 to the seventh, 5 to the eighth, 3 to the ninth and 1 to their least preferred.

A Song for Europe 1987 – 10 April 1987
| R/O | Artist | Song | Songwriter(s) | Points | Place |
|---|---|---|---|---|---|
| 1 | Rikki | "Only the Light" | Richard Peebles | 112 | 1 |
| 2 | Siy | "Lion Within" | David Hughes; Richard Marcangelo | 48 | 8 |
| 3 | Mike Stacey | "I Want You" | Steve Thompson; John Verity | 72 | 5 |
| 4 | Mal Pope | "Everybody" | Mal Pope | 58 | 7 |
| 5 | Ann Turner | "Too Hot to Handle" | Bob Heatlie | 101 | 2 |
| 6 | Ian Prince | "Master of the Game" | Ian Prince | 34 | 10 |
| 7 | Gordon Campbell | "Just Let Me" | Gordon Campbell | 43 | 9 |
| 8 | Zuice | "Bless Your Lucky Stars" | Stephen Carmichael | 78 | 3 |
| 9 | John T Ford | "What You Gonna Do" | John T. Ford; Malcolm Poole | 75 | 4 |
| 10 | Heavy Pettin' | "Romeo" | Gordon Bonner; Gary Moat; Steve Hayman | 60 | 6 |

Detailed Jury Votes
| R/O | Song | Belfast | Birmingham | Bristol | Edinburgh | Cardiff | Manchester | London | Newcastle | Norwich | Total |
|---|---|---|---|---|---|---|---|---|---|---|---|
| 1 | "Only the Light" | 12 | 7 | 15 | 15 | 8 | 10 | 15 | 15 | 15 | 112 |
| 2 | "Lion Within" | 6 | 3 | 10 | 3 | 5 | 9 | 8 | 3 | 1 | 48 |
| 3 | "I Want You" | 8 | 5 | 9 | 6 | 9 | 6 | 9 | 10 | 10 | 72 |
| 4 | "Everybody" | 10 | 1 | 12 | 8 | 6 | 8 | 7 | 1 | 5 | 58 |
| 5 | "Too Hot to Handle" | 9 | 12 | 8 | 12 | 15 | 12 | 12 | 9 | 12 | 101 |
| 6 | "Master of the Game" | 1 | 8 | 1 | 1 | 3 | 5 | 5 | 7 | 3 | 34 |
| 7 | "Just Let Me" | 7 | 3 | 7 | 10 | 1 | 3 | 1 | 5 | 6 | 43 |
| 8 | "Bless Your Lucky Stars" | 5 | 9 | 5 | 5 | 12 | 15 | 10 | 8 | 9 | 78 |
| 9 | "What You Gonna Do" | 15 | 10 | 6 | 7 | 7 | 7 | 3 | 12 | 8 | 75 |
| 10 | "Romeo" | 3 | 15 | 3 | 9 | 10 | 1 | 6 | 6 | 7 | 60 |
Jury Spokespersons
Belfast – Stefanie Callister; Birmingham – Pamela Armstrong; Bristol – Angela Rippon; Edinburgh – Louise Welsh; Cardiff – Iwan Thomas; Manchester – John Mundy; London – Colin Berry; Newcastle – Simon Willis; Norwich – Susan Osman

== At Eurovision ==
"Only the Light" was performed 14th in the running order on the night of the contest, following Luxembourg and preceding France. At the close of the voting, United Kingdom had received 47 points, placing 13th out of 22 competing countries. It was the worst performing entry of the UK up to that point, and would remain so for the next 13 years, until 2000.

The British jury awarded its 12 points to the contest winners Ireland.

=== Voting ===
Points awarded to the United Kingdom
| Score | Country |
|---|---|
| 12 points | |
| 10 points | Israel |
| 8 points | |
| 7 points | |
| 6 points | |
| 5 points | Austria; Sweden; Switzerland |
| 4 points | Denmark |
| 3 points | Belgium; Ireland; Portugal; Turkey |
| 2 points | Cyprus; Yugoslavia |
| 1 point | Finland; Luxembourg |

Points awarded by the United Kingdom
| Score | Country |
|---|---|
| 12 points | Ireland |
| 10 points | Germany |
| 8 points | Belgium |
| 7 points | Denmark |
| 6 points | Cyprus |
| 5 points | Greece |
| 4 points | Israel |
| 3 points | Netherlands |
| 2 points | Luxembourg |
| 1 point | Italy |
