= Garo Mafyan =

- Born: 24 February 1951 (age 74); Istanbul, Turkey
- Genres: Pop
- Occupation(s): Musician, composer, music producer
- Instrument(s): Piano, pipe organ
- Years active: 1980–present

Garo Mafyan (born 24 February 1951) is a Turkish musician, composer and music producer of Armenian descent.

== Personal life ==
He grew up in Erenköy, Istanbul. He is married to Gülyüz (née Bayraktaroğlu) Mafyan, and has a daughter named Damla. He is related to Agop Dilaçar, head western languages specialist of the Turkish Language Association, as well as Levon Aşçiyan, the last palace doctor.
