= Gente di mare =

1987 Umberto Tozzi and Raf song

Single by Umberto Tozzi & Raf
- Language: Italian
- Released: 1987
- Composer: Giancarlo Bigazzi
- Lyricists: Umberto Tozzi; Raffaele Riefoli

Umberto Tozzi singles chronology
"Si può dare di più" (1987)	"Gente di mare" (1987)	"Immensamente" "Tu sei di me" (1988)

Raffaele Riefoli singles chronology
"London Town" (1987)	"Gente di mare" (1987)	"Inevitabile follia" (1988)

Eurovision Song Contest 1987 entry
- Country: Italy
- Artists: Umberto Tozzi; Raffaele Riefoli
- As: Umberto Tozzi & Raf
- Language: Italian
- Composer: Giancarlo Bigazzi
- Lyricists: Umberto Tozzi; Raffaele Riefoli
- Conductor: Gianfranco Lombardi

Finals performance
- Final result: 3rd
- Final points: 103

Entry chronology
- ◄ "Magic Oh Magic" (1985)
- "Vivo (Ti scrivo)" (1988) ►

"Gente di mare" ("Seafarers", lit. "People of the Sea") is a song recorded by Italian duo Umberto Tozzi & Raf. It represented Italy in the Eurovision Song Contest 1987, placing third.

== Description and performance ==
The song is a blues-influenced ballad, in which the singers describe the qualities of the "people of the sea". They describe themselves as "people of the plain", who are "prisoners of this city", while contrasting that with the freedom of the people of the sea "who leave [things] behind".

The song was performed seventh on the night, following Sweden's "Boogaloo" by Lotta Engberg and preceding Portugal's "Neste barco à vela" by Nevada. At the close of voting, it had received 103 points, placing 3rd in a field of 22.

While not winning the contest, the song achieved considerable popularity, becoming a Top 10 hit in most parts of Continental Europe and Scandinavia in the summer of 1987 (#7 in Switzerland, #8 in Austria, #6 in Sweden) and was included on the compilations of Winners and Classics produced to coincide with the Congratulations special in late 2005.

It was succeeded as Italian representative at the 1988 contest by Luca Barbarossa with "Vivo (Ti scrivo)".

== Charts ==
=== Weekly charts ===
Chart (1987)	Peak position
Austria (Ö3 Austria Top 40)	8
Belgium (Ultratop 50 Flanders)	5
Italy (FIMI)	3
Italy Airplay (Music & Media)	2
Netherlands (Dutch Top 40)	20
Netherlands (Single Top 100)	21
Sweden (Sverigetopplistan)	6
Switzerland (Schweizer Hitparade)	7
West Germany (GfK)	39

== Certifications ==
Region	Certification	Certified units/sales
Italy (FIMI) Sales and streaming since 2009	Gold	50,000^{‡}
^{‡} Sales+streaming figures based on certification alone.
