= 1991 in Nordic music =

The following is a list of notable events and releases that happened in Nordic music in 1991.

== Events ==
- January – A-ha break a Guinness World Record for the biggest rock concert attendance when they attract an audience of 198,000 at the Maracanã stadium during the Rock in Rio II festival.
- 22 March – On the first day of Norway's Vossajazz festival, Per Jørgensen is awarded the festival prize.
- 4 May – Following a tie-break, Sweden's "Fångad av en stormvind", performed by Carola, wins the 36th Eurovision Song Contest in Rome. Of the other Scandinavian countries, Norway finish 17th, Denmark 19th and Finland 20th.
- August – Swedish glam rock band The Ark form and hold their first rehearsals in Rottne.
- unknown date – Denmark's national baroque orchestra, Concerto Copenhagen, gives its first concerts.

== Classical works ==
- Einar Englund – Clarinet Concerto
- Ulf Grahn – Vid Ales stenar
- Vagn Holmboe
  - To the Calm Sea
  - To the Unsettled Weather
- Kaija Saariaho – Nuits, adieux

== Film and TV scores ==
- Geir Bøhren and Bent Åserud – The Polar Bear King
- Joachim Holbek – Europa
- Sigvald Tveit – Sesam stasjon

== Hit singles ==
- 2 X Kaj – "Alle Børnene" (#1 Denmark)
- A-ha – "Move to Memphis" (#2 Norway)
- Army of Lovers – "Crucified" (#1 Belgium; #2 Greece, Netherlands; #8 Sweden)
- Cut 'N' Move
  - "Spread Love" (#1 Denmark)
  - "Take No Crap (Get Serious)" (#1 Denmark)
- Juice Leskinen – "Pienestä pitäen" (#1 Finland)
- Roxette – "Joyride" (#1 Australia, Denmark, Germany, Netherlands, Norway, Sweden, US)
- Sielun Veljet – "Laatikoita" (#1 Finland)

== Eurovision Song Contest ==
- Denmark in the Eurovision Song Contest 1991
- Finland in the Eurovision Song Contest 1991
- Iceland in the Eurovision Song Contest 1991
- Norway in the Eurovision Song Contest 1991
- Sweden in the Eurovision Song Contest 1991

== Births ==
- 29 May – Matoma, Norwegian DJ and record producer

== Deaths ==
- 24 March – Albert Järvinen, Finnish rock guitarist (born 1950; heart attack)
- 1 April – Bjarne Nerem, Norwegian jazz saxophonist (born 1923).
- 8 April – Per Yngve Ohlin, aka 'Dead', Swedish vocalist (born 1969; suicide)
- 7 July – Jan Wølner, Norwegian classical pianist (born 1909)
- 31 July – Magne Elvestrand, Norwegian pianist, harpsichordist and organist (born 1914)
- 16 October – Ole Beich, rock bassist (born 1955; drowned)
- 18 October – Gunnar Sønstevold, Norwegian composer (born 1912)
