= Spain in the Eurovision Song Contest 1991 =

- Eurovision Song Contest 1991
- Participating broadcaster: Televisión Española (TVE)
- Country: Spain
- Selection process: Internal selection
- Announcement date: 5 April 1991

Competing entry
- Song: "Bailar pegados"
- Artist: Sergio Dalma
- Songwriters: Julio Seijas; Luis Gómez-Escolar

Placement
- Final result: 4th, 119 points

Participation chronology

Spain was represented at the Eurovision Song Contest 1991 with the song "Bailar pegados", composed by Julio Seijas, with lyrics by Luis Gómez-Escolar, and performed by Sergio Dalma. The Spanish participating broadcaster, Televisión Española (TVE), internally selected its entry for the contest. The song, performed in position 19, placed fourth out of twenty-two competing entries with 119 points.

== Before Eurovision ==
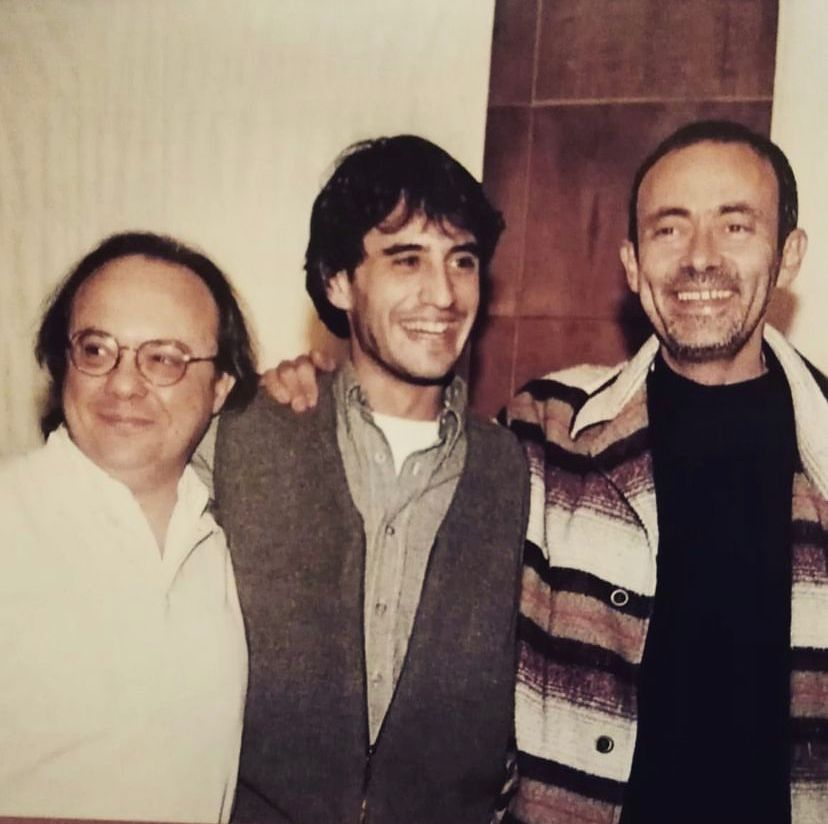
Left to right: Julio Seijas, Sergio Dalma, and Luis Gómez-Escolar.

Televisión Española (TVE) internally selected "Bailar pegados" performed by Sergio Dalma as its entry for the Eurovision Song Contest 1991. The song was composed by Julio Seijas, and had lyrics by Luis Gómez-Escolar. The song was premiered on the TVE show ¡Viva el espectáculo! on 5 April 1991.

== At Eurovision ==
On 4 May 1991, the Eurovision Song Contest was held at Stage 15 of Cinecittà studios in Rome hosted by Radiotelevisione italiana (RAI), and broadcast live throughout the continent. Dalma performed "Bailar pegados" 19th on the evening, following Belgium and preceding the United Kingdom. In his introductory video postcard, Dalma sang Rocky Roberts' "Sono tremendo". Eduardo Leiva conducted the event's orchestra performance of the Spanish entry. At the close of the voting "Bailar pegados" had received 119 points, placing 4th in a field of 22.

TVE broadcast the contest in Spain on TVE 2 with commentary by Tomás Fernando Flores. It was watched by nearly 5 million people in average. Before the event, TVE aired a talk show hosted by Isabel Gemio introducing the Spanish jury, which continued after the contest commenting on the results.

=== Voting ===
TVE assembled a jury panel with sixteen members. The following members comprised the Spanish jury:

- Antonio Sempere – journalist
- Maisa Lloret – rhythmic gymnast
- Marcos Fernández – student
- Celia Cosgaya – student
- Gabriel Jaraba – journalist
- María Antonia Valls – journalist
- Paco Clavel – artist
- Salomé – singer, won Eurovision for Spain in 1969
- Loles León – actress
- Alfonso del Real – actor
- María Casal – actress
- Ricardo Cantalapiedra – journalist
- Nuria Esther Martín – dancer
- Jesús de Vega – physician
- María Eugenia Castellanos – public relations
- Begoña Castro – dancer

The jury was chaired by Francisco Soriano. The jury awarded its maximum of 12 points to Israel.

Points awarded to Spain
Score	Country
12 points	Cyprus; Switzerland
10 points	Greece
8 points	Portugal; Turkey; Yugoslavia
7 points	Austria; Germany
6 points	Belgium; France; Ireland; Luxembourg; Malta
5 points	
4 points	Finland; Norway; Sweden
3 points	
2 points	Iceland; Israel
1 point	United Kingdom

Points awarded by Spain
Score	Country
12 points	Israel
10 points	Portugal
8 points	France
7 points	Italy
6 points	Malta
5 points	Greece
4 points	Sweden
3 points	Belgium
2 points	Turkey
1 point	Germany
