= Cyprus in the Eurovision Song Contest 1991 =

- Eurovision Song Contest 1991
- Participating broadcaster: Cyprus Broadcasting Corporation (CyBC)
- Country: Cyprus
- Selection process: National final
- Selection date: 2 March 1991

Competing entry
- Song: "S.O.S."
- Artist: Elena Patroklou
- Songwriters: Kypros Charalambous; Andreas Christou

Placement
- Final result: 9th, 60 points

Participation chronology

Cyprus was represented at the Eurovision Song Contest 1991 with the song "S.O.S.", composed by Kypros Charalambous, with lyrics by Andreas Christou, and performed by Elena Patroklou. The Cypriot participating broadcaster, the Cyprus Broadcasting Corporation (CyBC), selected its entry through a national final.

== Before Eurovision ==
=== Epilogí Tragoudioú Giourovízion ===
==== Competing entries ====
The Cyprus Broadcasting Corporation (CyBC) announced its intention to participate in the Eurovision Song Contest 1991 on 25 September 1990. CyBC then opened a submission period for Cypriot artists and composers to submit songs from 22 November 1990 until 10 January 1991. By the end of the submission period, 72 entries had been submitted. On 10 February 1991, a 15-member jury panel, along with a chairman and four non-voting members, listened to the submitted songs and decided the eight competing entries.

Competing entries
R/O	Artist	Song	Songwriter(s)
3	Andri Kyriazi	"Mitera Gi" (Μητέρα Γη)	Giannakis Varnavas
6	Panikos Charalambous	"Eleftheria" (Ελευθερία)	Petros Giannakis
14	Antonis Saralis	"E, kai ti egine" (Ε, και τι έγινε)	Savvas Savva, Tonia Kyriakou
18	Elena Patroklou	"S.O.S."	Kypros Charalambous, Andreas Christou
55	Evridiki	"O epomenos aionas" (Ο επόμενος αιώνας)	Giorgos Theofanous, Leonidas Malenis
56	Yiannis Dimitriou	"Mila mou, mila mou" (Μίλα μου, μίλα μου)	Giorgos Anastasiou Stavrou, Giorgos Karavokyris
59	Kostas Violaris	"En i mana mou pou ftaiei" (Εν η μάνα μου που φταίει)	Kostas Violaris
62	Yianna Panayidou and Savvas Savva	"Psachno gia elpida" (Ψάχνω για ελπίδα)	Savvas Savva, Maria Kourou

Competing entry selection jury members
Non-voting	Tasos Georgios – chief television operator at CyBC (chairman); Panos Ionaddis – head of television programmes at CyBC; Michalis Stylianou – CyBC chief accountant; Stavros Panagidis – CyBC first accounting officer; Christakis Ioannou – checked validity of entered submissions
Voting	Themis Christodoulou; Marinos Mitelas; Christodoulos Achilleovdis; Michalis Stavridis; Antonis Christoforidis; Maro Skordi; Giorgos Siecherlis; Mike Sarridis; Sempouch Apkarian; Giannis Adeilinis; Takis Thomas; Lysandros Avrasmidis; Giorgos Kotsonis; Lygia Konstantinidou; Marios Skordis

==== Final ====
The final was broadcast live at 21:10 (EET) on RIK on 2 March 1991 in a show named Epilogí Tragoudioú Giourovízion (Greek: Επιλογή Τραγουδιού Γιουροβίζιον). The final was held in the International Convention Centre in Nicosia, and was hosted by Evi Papamichail. The results were decided by a 24-member jury. The running order was drawn at random.

Final - 2 March 1991
R/O	Artist	Song	Points	Place
1	Yiannis Dimitriou	"Mila mou, mila mou" (Μίλα μου, μίλα μου)	103	6
2	Antonis Saralis	"E, kai ti egine" (Ε, και τι έγινε)	124	4
3	Andri Kyriazi	"Mitera Gi" (Μητέρα Γη)	116	5
4	Evridiki	"O epomenos aionas" (Ο επόμενος αιώνας)	153	2
5	Elena Patroklou	"S.O.S."	196	1
6	Yianna Panayidou and Savvas Savva	"Psachno gia elpida" (Ψάχνω για ελπίδα)	62	7
7	Kostas Violaris	"En i mana mou pou ftaiei" (Εν η μάνα μου που φταίει)	32	8
8	Panikos Charalambous	"Eleftheria" (Ελευθερία)	150	3

== At Eurovision ==
On the night of the final, Elena Patroklou performed 21st in the running order, following the United Kingdom and preceding Italy. At the close of voting "S.O.S." had received 60 points, placing Cyprus ninth out of 22 countries. The Cypriot jury awarded its 12 points to Spain.

=== Voting ===
Points awarded to Cyprus
Score	Country
12 points	France; Greece; Malta
10 points	
8 points	
7 points	
6 points	Israel
5 points	Ireland
4 points	Luxembourg
3 points	Iceland; Portugal
2 points	Yugoslavia
1 point	Germany

Points awarded by Cyprus
Score	Country
12 points	Spain
10 points	Greece
8 points	Switzerland
7 points	France
6 points	Sweden
5 points	Israel
4 points	Portugal
3 points	Germany
2 points	Luxembourg
1 point	United Kingdom
