= Yugoslavia in the Eurovision Song Contest 1991 =

- Eurovision Song Contest 1991
- Participating broadcaster: Jugoslavenska radiotelevizija (JRT)
- Country: Yugoslavia
- Selection process: Jugovizija 1991
- Selection date: 9 March 1991

Competing entry
- Song: "Brazil"
- Artist: Baby Doll
- Songwriters: Zoran Vračević; Dragana Šarić

Placement
- Final result: 21st, 1 point

Participation chronology

Yugoslavia was represented at the Eurovision Song Contest 1991 with the song "Brazil" (Бразил), composed by Zoran Vračrvić, with lyrics by Dragana Šarić, and performed by Šarić herself under her stage name Bebi Dol. The Yugoslavian participating broadcaster, Jugoslavenska radiotelevizija (JRT), organized a national final, JRT izbor za pjesmu Evrovizije – Sarajevo '91, to select its entry for the contest. This was the penultimate entry from Yugoslavia in the Eurovision Song Contest.

== Before Eurovision ==
=== Jugovizija 1991 ===
TV Sarajevo (TVSa) staged the Yugoslav national final on 9 March 1991 at its television Studio A in Sarajevo, hosted by Draginja Balać and Senad Hadžifejzović. The formal name of the contest was JRT izbor za pjesmu Evrovizije – Sarajevo '91. There were 16 songs in the final, from all subnational public broadcasters. This was the final Jugovizija participation for the broadcasters in Croatia, Macedonia, and Slovenia before the countries declared their independence later in the same year.

The winner was chosen by the votes of twenty-four jurors coming from eight broadcasting stations, one three-member jury for each of the subnational public broadcasters of JRT. Each jury was consisted of at least two professionals within the music industry, and one under age of 30. Each of the jurors gave points to their favorite songs according to a system with the ascending format of going from 1–3, 5 and finally 7 points. The subnational public broadcasters could vote for their own entries. The winning entry was "Brazil", performed by Serbian singer Bebi Dol, composed by Zoran Vračević and written by Bebi Dol herself.

The tensions in Yugoslavia at the time were showing through Jugovizija. The contest was held under the presumption that an entry from Croatian Radiotelevision (HTV) wouldn't win the contest, with high tensions between the Yugoslav federal institutions led by the Serbian president Slobodan Milošević and the Croatian president Franjo Tuđman. With Milošević exerting control over institutions Montenegro, Vojvodina and Kosovo - including the broadcasters - the three broadcasters were pressured to vote in a similar fashion to Serbian TV Belgrade (TVBg). The winning song, "Brazil" by Bebi Dol, received points from Belgrade (Serbia), Titograd (Montenegro), Novi Sad (Vojvodina) and Priština (Kosovo), and received no points from Sarajevo (Bosnia & Herzegovina), Ljubljana (Slovenia), Skopje (Macedonia) and Zagreb (Croatia). The favourite candidate from Croatia, "Daj, obuci levisice" by Danijel Popović, received no points from Belgrade and Priština.

Final – 9 March 1991
R/O	Broadcaster	Artist	Song	Points	Place
1	HTV	Tedi Spalato	"Gospode moj"	29	5
2	RTV Belgrade	Zorana Pavić	"Ritam ljubavi"	26	6
3	RTV Pristina	Milica Milisavljević-Dugalić	"Sta će nebo reći"	20	10
4	RTV Belgrade	Bebi Dol	"Brazil"	68	1
5	RTVSLO	Miran Rudan	"Ne reci goodbye"	5	15
6	RTV Sarajevo	Jelena Džoja	"Čuvaj se ljubavi"	9	13
7	RTV Skopje	Margarita Hristova	"Daj mi krilja"	3	16
8	RTV Novi Sad	Vesna Ivić	"Ime"	11	11
9	HTV	Ivana Banfić	"Daj, povedi me"	57	3
10	RTVSLO	Helena Blagne	"Navaden majski dan"	25	7
11	RTV Belgrade	Šeri	"Da li već spavaš"	6	14
12	TVCG	Ponoćni express	"Pjesma o tebi"	22	8
13	RTV Novi Sad	Tony Cetinski	"Marina"	22	8
14	HTV	Daniel	"Ma daj obuci levisice"	66	2
15	RTV Skopje	Anastasija Nizamova-Muhić	"Molitva"	11	11
16	RTV Sarajevo	Zerina Cokoja	"Bez tebe"	52	4

Entries submitted by broadcaster whose jury members were voting

Detailed Jury Votes
R/O	Song	HTV			RTV Belgrade			RTV Pristina			RTVSLO			RTV Sarajevo			RTV Skopje			RTV Novi Sad			TVCG			Total
R/O	Song	Stipica Kalogjera	Danijela Bilbija	Ivica Krajač	Boba Stefanović	Katarina Gojković	Laza Ristovski	Ljiljana Đorđević	Dragan Nikolić	Anđela Karaferić	Nino Robić	Tomaž Domicelj	Tanja Ribič	Fadil Redžić	Jadranka Crnogorac	Anton Josipović	Mario Lipša	Jana Andreevska	Stole Popov	Mladen Vranešević	Gordana Dean-Gačić	Jovan Adamov	Goran Pejović	Aco Đukanović	Rade Keković	Total
1	"Gospode moj"	3	2	2							2	7	7	1	2	3										29
2	"Ritam ljubavi"				3	2	2	3	2	2										5	3			1	3	26
3	"Sta će nebo reći"							5	5	5								5								20
4	"Brazil"				7	7	7	7	7	7										7	7	5	2	3	2	68
5	"Ne reci goodbye"										5															5
6	"Čuvaj se ljubavi"													5	3							1				9
7	"Daj mi krilja"																1	1							1	3
8	"Ime"						1													3		7				11
9	"Daj, povedi me"	1	7	5	1	5	5				7	3	2		5	7			1	2	5		1			57
10	"Navaden majski dan"	5	1	1			3				3	2	1					7				2				25
11	"Da li već spavaš"				5			1																		6
12	"Pjesma o tebi"								1	3						1							5	5	7	22
13	"Marina"	2	3	3	2	3								2			3		2	1	1					22
14	"Ma daj obuci levisice"	7	5	7								1	5	7	7	5	5	2	5		2	3	3	2		66
15	"Molitva"														1		7		3							11
16	"Bez tebe"					1		2	3	1	1	5	3	3		2	2	3	7				7	7	5	52

== At Eurovision ==
Bebi Dol was the first performer on the night of the contest, preceding Iceland. At the close of the voting the song had received only 1 point, coming 21st in the field of 22 competing countries, beating only Austria. The Yugoslav jury awarded its 12 points to Israel.

The contest was broadcast on TV Belgrade 1, TVCG 1, TV Novi Sad, TV Prishtina (all with commentary by Mladen Popović), and on HTV 1 (on a delay), TV Sarajevo 1, TV Slovenija 1, TV Skopje 1 (all with commentary by Ksenija Urličić).

=== Voting ===
Points awarded to Yugoslavia
Score	Country
12 points	
10 points	
8 points	
7 points	
6 points	
5 points	
4 points	
3 points	
2 points	
1 point	Malta

Points awarded by Yugoslavia
Score	Country
12 points	Israel
10 points	France
8 points	Spain
7 points	Italy
6 points	Sweden
5 points	Switzerland
4 points	Greece
3 points	Ireland
2 points	Cyprus
1 point	Malta
