= Ireland in the Eurovision Song Contest 1991 =

- Eurovision Song Contest 1991
- Participating broadcaster: Radio Telefís Éireann (RTÉ)
- Country: Ireland
- Selection process: Eurosong '91
- Selection date: 30 March 1991

Competing entry
- Song: "Could It Be That I'm in Love"
- Artist: Kim Jackson
- Songwriter: Liam Reilly

Placement
- Final result: 10th, 47 points

Participation chronology

Ireland was represented at the Eurovision Song Contest 1991 with the song "Could It Be That I'm in Love", written by Liam Reilly, and performed by Kim Jackson. The Irish participating broadcaster, Radio Telefís Éireann (RTÉ), selected its entry through Eurosong '91. Reilly had already represented Ireland in 1990, with Jackson providing backing vocals for that entry.

== Before Eurovision ==
=== Eurosong '91 ===
Radio Telefís Éireann (RTÉ) held Eurosong '91 on 30 March 1991 at the RTÉ Television Centre in Dublin, hosted by Pat Kenny. Originally, eight songs were set to compete, but one was withdrawn the week before the contest, bringing the number of songs to seven. The winner was selected by ten regional juries. After the regional juries had voted, songs 5 and 7 were tied. A special tiebreak jury was called to determine the winner, choosing "Could It Be That I'm in Love".

R/O	Artist	Song	Points	Place
1	Patricia Moloney	"Captivity"	42	7
2	Brian O'Reilly	"Too Many Questions"	88	3
3	Flo McSweeney	"Why Can't Forever Last?"	65	5
4	Mike Sherrard	"When Do I Get Over You?"	53	6
5	Kim Jackson	"Could It Be That I'm in Love"	94	1
6	Passion	"Sa deireadh thiar"	86	4
7	Jane Hennessy	"Dream Come True"	93	2

Detailed Regional Jury Votes
R/O	Song	Athlone	Cork	Dublin	Dundalk	Galway	Gweedore	Killarney	Limerick	Sligo	Waterford	Total
1	"Captivity"	4	4	4	4	4	4	5	5	4	4	42
2	"Too Many Questions"	6	10	6	7	12	10	12	6	7	12	88
3	"Why Can't Forever Last?"	5	5	8	8	8	6	6	7	6	6	65
4	"When Do I Get Over You?"	7	7	5	5	6	5	4	4	5	5	53
5	"Could It Be That I'm In Love?"	12	8	10	10	10	7	10	10	8	8	93
6	"Sa deireadh thiar"	8	6	7	12	5	12	7	12	10	7	86
7	"Dream Come True"	10	12	12	6	7	8	8	8	12	10	93

== At Eurovision ==
"Could It Be that I'm in Love" was performed eleventh in the running order on the night of the contest, following Turkey and preceding Portugal. At the close of the voting sequence, Ireland had 47 points, tying them with the United Kingdom for tenth place.

RTÉ 1 broadcast the contest with Pat Kenny providing the television commentary. Kenny had previously handled the radio coverage between 1980 and 1982 and later hosted the 1988 Contest. RTÉ Radio 1 also broadcast the contest with commentary provided by Larry Gogan. RTÉ appointed Eileen Dunne as its spokesperson to announce the Irish jury vote.

=== Voting ===
Points awarded to Ireland
Score	Country
12 points	
10 points	
8 points	Luxembourg
7 points	Denmark
6 points	
5 points	Belgium
4 points	Malta; Turkey; United Kingdom
3 points	Italy; Switzerland; Yugoslavia
2 points	Finland; Germany
1 point	Austria; Israel

Points awarded by Ireland
Score	Country
12 points	Malta
10 points	Italy
8 points	Israel
7 points	France
6 points	Spain
5 points	Cyprus
4 points	Finland
3 points	Sweden
2 points	Switzerland
1 point	Greece
