= Israel in the Eurovision Song Contest 1991 =

- Eurovision Song Contest 1991
- Participating broadcaster: Israel Broadcasting Authority (IBA)
- Country: Israel
- Selection process: Kdam Eurovision 1991
- Selection date: 27 March 1991

Competing entry
- Song: "Kan"
- Artist: Duo Datz
- Songwriter: Uzi Hitman

Placement
- Final result: 3rd, 139 points

Participation chronology

Israel was represented at the Eurovision Song Contest 1991 with the song "Kan", written by Uzi Hitman, and performed by Duo Datz. The Israeli participating broadcaster, the Israel Broadcasting Authority (IBA), selected its entry for the contest through Kdam Eurovision 1991.

== Before Eurovision ==
=== Kdam Eurovision 1991 ===
The Israel Broadcasting Authority (IBA) held the national final on 27 March 1991, hosted by Danny Roup and Shira Gera. 12 songs competed in the final held of 27 March 1991, where 7 regional juries chose the winner. There was an orchestra however, it was still performed in playback. After the 12 songs were performed, Daniel Pe'er hosted an awarding show of all Israeli Shows. Voting was done after the awarding.

Although the competition featured an orchestra for the twelve competing entries, the performances were not fully live. According to conductors such as Kobi Oshrat, Eldad Shrem, and Nanssi Brandes, the original plan was for the orchestra to perform the music live. However, due to budgetary constraints—particularly the cost of hiring a sound technician—the production ultimately relied on prerecorded backing tracks.

As a result, the orchestra played live accompaniment alongside the playback track rather than performing the entire arrangement live. This differed from the approach used in 1987, where the instrumental accompaniment was performed entirely through playback. In this instance, the orchestra functioned largely as a prop during the performances.

During the awarding segment, however, the music was performed live by the orchestra under the direction of David Krivoshei.

The winner was Duo Datz with the song "Kan".

Final – 27 March 1991
R/O	Artist	Song	Conductor	Points	Place
1	Adam	"Yachad na'amod" (יחד נעמוד)	Eldad Shrem	53	2
2	Elinor Aharon and Tzeirey Tel-Aviv	"Tze'ira" (צעירה)	Ilan Gilboa	49	4
3	Ilana Avital	"Ahavati ha'achrona" (אהבתי האחרונה)	Nansi Brandes	14	9
4	Shir	"Kol shana" (כל שנה)	David Krivoshei	51	3
5	Shimi Tavori	"Mitga'age'ah la'romantica" (מתגעגע לרומנטיקה)	Eldad Shrem	5	11
6	Yoel Lerner and Moti Dichne	"Primadonna" (פרימדונה)	Kobi Oshrat	11	10
7	Tal Amir	"Mikol hashtikot" (מכל השתיקות)	Kobi Oshrat	2	12
8	Shlomi Shabat	"Mikan" (מכאן)	Yoram Zadok	41	5
9	Ofira Yossefi	"Olam" (עולם)	Yoram Zadok	35	7
10	Uri Fineman	"Hava nagila, gila" (הבה נגילה, גילה)	Nansi Brandes	41	5
11	Puncher	"Bella" (בלה)	Kobi Oshrat	34	8
12	Duo Datz	"Kan" (כאן)	Kobi Oshrat	70	1

Detailed Regional Jury Votes
R/O	Song	Jerusalem	Dimona	Ariel	Kibbutz Palmach Tzova	Haifa	Petah Tikva	Tel Aviv	Total
1	"Yachad na'amod"	8	10	8	3	8	6	10	53
2	"Tze'ira"	7	7	3	10	10	8	4	49
3	"Ahavati ha'achrona"	2	6			4	1	1	14
4	"Kol shana"	12	3	7	7	7	10	5	51
5	"Mitga'age'ah la'romantica"			2	1			2	5
6	"Primadonna"	1	1	1	5	3			11
7	"Mikol hashtikot"						2		2
8	"Mikan"	6	5	5	8	2	7	8	41
9	"Olam"	3	4	6	6	5	5	6	35
10	"Hava nagila, gila"	5	12	10	2	1	4	7	41
11	"Bella"	4	2	4	12	6	3	3	34
12	"Kan"	10	8	12	4	12	12	12	70

== At Eurovision ==
Duo Datz performed 15th on the night of the contest, following Norway and preceding Finland. At the close of the voting it had received 139 points, placing 3rd in a field of 22.

=== Voting ===
Points awarded to Israel
Score	Country
12 points	Spain; Turkey; Yugoslavia
10 points	Denmark; Iceland; United Kingdom
8 points	Belgium; Ireland; Malta; Switzerland
7 points	Norway
6 points	Finland; Sweden
5 points	Cyprus; Greece; Luxembourg
4 points	Portugal
3 points	France
2 points	
1 point	

Points awarded by Israel
Score	Country
12 points	France
10 points	Sweden
8 points	Switzerland
7 points	Turkey
6 points	Cyprus
5 points	United Kingdom
4 points	Greece
3 points	Italy
2 points	Spain
1 point	Ireland
