= Austria in the Eurovision Song Contest 1991 =

- Eurovision Song Contest 1991
- Participating broadcaster: Österreichischer Rundfunk (ORF)
- Country: Austria
- Selection process: National final
- Selection date: 16 March 1991

Competing entry
- Song: "Venedig im Regen"
- Artist: Thomas Forstner
- Songwriters: Robby Musenbichler; Hubert Moser; Wolfgang Eltner

Placement
- Final result: 22nd, 0 points

Participation chronology

Austria was represented at the Eurovision Song Contest 1991 with the song "Venedig im Regen", written by Robby Musenbichler, Hubert Moser, and Wolfgang Eltner, and performed by Thomas Forstner. The Austrian participating broadcaster Österreichischer Rundfunk (ORF), selected its entry through a national final.

== Before Eurovision ==
=== National final ===
Österreichischer Rundfunk (ORF) held the national final on 16 March 1991 at its studios in Vienna, hosted by Andreas Steppan and Nicole Fendesack. The winner was decided by televoting (50%) and an expert jury (50%).

Final – 16 March 1991
R/O	Artist	Song	Place
1	Alex	"Zurück zu dir"	8
2	Erwin Bros	"Nur vom Frieden zu reden"	4
3	Natascha	"Gebt den Kindern dieser Welt..."	10
4	Three Girl Madhouse	"1001"	9
5	Anita	"Land in Sicht"	7
6	Fresh	"Spürst du..."	6
7	Tony Wegas	"Wunder dieser Welt"	2
8	Curt Strohm	"Feuer"	5
9	Alex and Elisa	"Du und ich"	3
10	Thomas Forstner	"Venedig im Regen"	1

== At Eurovision ==
Forstner performed 6th on the night of the contest, following Switzerland's "Canzone per te" by Sandra Simó and preceding Luxembourg's "Un baiser volé" by Sarah Bray. At the close of the voting the song had received zero points, placing last of 22.

=== Voting ===
Austria did not receive any points at the Eurovision Song Contest 1991.

Points awarded by Austria
Score	Country
12 points	France
10 points	Sweden
8 points	Switzerland
7 points	Spain
6 points	United Kingdom
5 points	Luxembourg
4 points	Malta
3 points	Belgium
2 points	Greece
1 point	Ireland
