= Switzerland in the Eurovision Song Contest 1991 =

- Eurovision Song Contest 1991
- Participating broadcaster: Swiss Broadcasting Corporation (SRG SSR)
- Country: Switzerland
- Selection process: Concours Eurovision de la Chanson
- Selection date: 23 February 1991

Competing entry
- Song: "Canzone per te"
- Artist: Sandra Simó
- Songwriter: Renato Mascetti

Placement
- Final result: 5th, 118 points

Participation chronology

Switzerland was represented at the Eurovision Song Contest 1991 with the song "Canzone per te", written by Renato Mascetti, and performed by Sandra Simó. The Swiss participating broadcaster, the Swiss Broadcasting Corporation (SRG SSR), selected its entry through a national final.

== Before Eurovision ==
=== Regional selections ===
The Swiss Broadcasting Corporation (SRG SSR) held a national final to select its entry for the Eurovision Song Contest 1991. Each division of SRG SSR — Swiss German and Romansh broadcaster Schweizer Fernsehen der deutschen und rätoromanischen Schweiz (SF DRS), Swiss French broadcaster Télévision suisse romande (TSR), and Swiss Italian broadcaster Televisione Svizzera di lingua italiana (TSI) — used its own method to select its entries for the final. Eligible songs were required to have been composed by songwriters from Switzerland or Liechtenstein, and applicants could register their songs in a cassette tape until 27 October 1990.

In total, 143 songs were submitted (with 18 being invalid), of which nine were selected: three each in French, German and Italian. It is unknown how the regional broadcasters selected their songs.

=== Concours Eurovision de la Chanson ===
TSR staged the national final on 23 February 1991 at 20:40 (CET) at the Casino du Rivage in Vevey. It was hosted by Lolita Morena, with Benoît Kaufman accompanying the orchestra. The national final was broadcast on TSR, SF, and TSI. The show was also aired on TV5 Europe in 9 April and on TV5 Québec Canada, in 14 May. Egon Egemann, who had represented Switzerland in 1990, made a guest appearance.

Among the participating artists were Daniela Simons, who had represented Switzerland in 1986; and Carol Rich, who represented Switzerland in 1987.

Participating entries
Broadcaster	Artist(s)	Song	Songwriter(s)		Language
Broadcaster	Artist(s)	Song	Composer(s)	Lyricist(s)	Language
RTSI	Marco, Daria & Mattia Zappa	"La nave va…"	Marco Zappa		Italian
RTSI	Daniela Simons	"Come finirà?"	Atilla Şereftuğ	Nella Martinetti	Italian
RTSI	Sandra Simó	"Canzone per te"	Renato Mascetti		Italian
SF DRS	Christine Nachbauer	"Segel im wind"	Philipp Martin Christen		German
SF DRS	R.C.O.	"Ruhelos"	Willi Rüegsegger	Heinz Neuenschwander; Willi Rüegsegger	German
SF DRS	Chris Lorens	"Ein ganzes leben lang"	Chris Lorens		German
TSR	Claude Lander	"Laissez-le vivre"	Claude Lander		French
TSR	Suisse Home	"Home Suisse Home"	Claude Lander; Joël Grammson; Pierre Collet		French
TSR	Carol Rich	"Donner la main"	Dom Torche		French

The voting consisted of regional public votes which were sent to the three divisions of SRG SSR (SF DRS, TSR, TSI: German-Romansh, French, and Italian speaking, respectively), a press jury, and an "expert" jury. The winner was the song "Canzone per te", composed by Renato Mascetti and performed by Sandra Simó, who received the maximum number of points available.

Final – 23 February 1991
R/O	Artist	Song	Regional Juries			Press Jury	Expert Jury	Total	Place
R/O	Artist	Song	DRS	TSI	TSR	Press Jury	Expert Jury	Total	Place
1	Marco, Daria & Mattia Zappa	"La nave va…"	4	7	2	1	8	22	5
2	Christine Nachbauer	"Segel im wind"	2	2	4	3	2	13	8
3	Claude Lander	"Laissez-le vivre"	1	3	1	5	1	11	9
4	R.C.O.	"Ruhelos"	6	4	5	2	3	20	6
5	Daniela Simons	"Come finirà?"	8	8	8	7	7	38	2
6	Suisse Home	"Home Suisse Home"	3	1	3	4	4	15	7
7	Sandra Simó	"Canzone per te"	10	10	10	10	10	50	1
8	Chris Lorens	"Ein ganzes leben lang"	7	6	7	8	6	34	3
9	Carol Rich	"Donner la main"	5	5	6	6	5	27	4

== At Eurovision ==
At the Eurovision Song Contest 1991, held at Cinecittà Studios in Rome, the Swiss entry was the tenth entry of the night following Austria and preceding Greece. The Swiss conductor at the contest was Flaviano Cuffari. At the close of voting, Switzerland had received 118 points in total; finishing in fifth place out of twenty-two countries.

The contest was broadcast on TV DRS (with commentary by Bernard Thurnheer) and through a second audio programme on TSR Chaîne nationale (with commentary by Lolita Morena) and on TSI Canale nazionale.

=== Voting ===
Each participating broadcaster assembled a jury panel with at least eleven members. The jurors awarded 1-8, 10, and 12 points to their top ten songs.

Points awarded to Switzerland
Score	Country
12 points	Belgium; Luxembourg
10 points	
8 points	Austria; Cyprus; Israel; Sweden; United Kingdom
7 points	Greece
6 points	Germany; Portugal
5 points	Denmark; Finland; Iceland; Yugoslavia
4 points	France; Italy
3 points	Norway
2 points	Ireland; Turkey
1 point	

Points awarded by Switzerland
Score	Country
12 points	Spain
10 points	Sweden
8 points	Israel
7 points	France
6 points	Malta
5 points	United Kingdom
4 points	Iceland
3 points	Ireland
2 points	Italy
1 point	Portugal
