= Bailar pegados =

1991 single by Sergio Dalma

Single by Sergio Dalma

from the album Sintiéndonos la piel
- Language: Spanish
- Released: 1991
- Recorded: Winter 1990–91
- Studio: Sonoland, Madrid
- Genre: Latin ballad
- Length: 4:36 (Original version); 3:00 (Eurovision version)
- Label: Horus
- Composer: Julio Seijas
- Lyricist: Luis Gómez-Escolar
- Producers: Seijas; Gómez-Escolar

Sergio Dalma singles chronology
"Esa chica es mía" (1989)	"Bailar pegados" (1991)	"Cómo me gusta" (1991)

Music video
- "Bailar pegados" on YouTube

Eurovision Song Contest 1991 entry
- Country: Spain
- Artist: Sergio Dalma
- Language: Spanish
- Composer: Julio Seijas
- Lyricist: Luis Gómez-Escolar
- Conductor: Eduardo Leiva

Finals performance
- Final result: 4th
- Final points: 119

Entry chronology
- ◄ "Bandido" (1990)
- "Todo esto es la música" (1992) ►

"Bailar pegados" (Spanish pronunciation: [bajˈlaɾ peˈɣaðos]; "Dancing Closely") is a song recorded by Spanish singer Sergio Dalma, with music composed by Julio Seijas and lyrics written by Luis Gómez-Escolar. It is the first single from Dalma's second studio album Sintiéndonos la piel, represented Spain in the Eurovision Song Contest 1991, placing fourth, and over time it has become one of his signature songs.

== Background ==
=== Conception ===
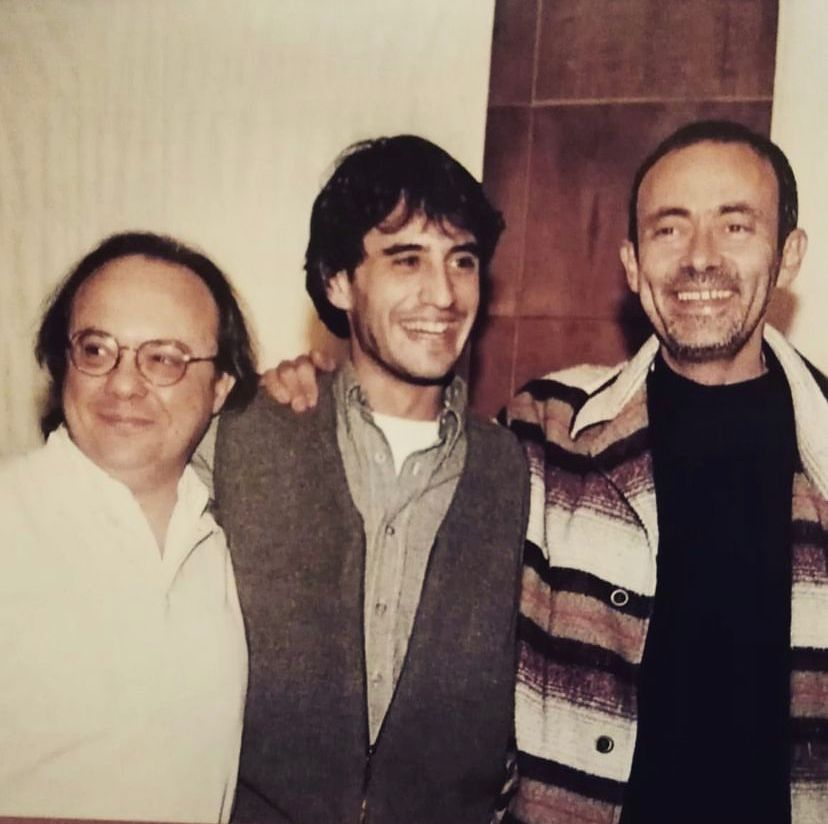
Left to right: Julio Seijas, Sergio Dalma, and Luis Gómez-Escolar.

"Bailar pegados" was composed by Julio Seijas with lyrics by Luis Gómez-Escolar and was recorded by Sergio Dalma for his second studio album Sintiéndonos la piel. It is a romantic ballad in which Dalma sings: "dancing closely is dancing like the sea dances with the dolphins / heart to heart in just one ballroom". Dalma also recorded the song in French as "Danser contre toi" with lyrics by Pierre Grosz and Italian as "Ballare stretti" with lyrics by Paolo Limiti.

=== Eurovision ===
Televisión Española (TVE) internally selected the song as its entrant for the 36th edition of the Eurovision Song Contest. For the song to participate in the contest, it was necessary to remove a verse and a chorus so that it fit into three minutes.

On 4 May 1991, the Eurovision Song Contest was held at Cinecittà studios in Rome hosted by Radiotelevisione italiana (RAI), and broadcast live throughout the continent. In his introductory video postcard, Dalma sang Rocky Roberts' "Sono tremendo". He performed "Bailar pegados" nineteenth on the night, following Belgium's "Geef het op" by Clouseau and preceding United Kingdom's "A Message to Your Heart" by Samantha Janus. Eduardo Leiva conducted the event's orchestra in the performance of the Spanish entry.

At the close of voting, it had received 119 points, placing fourth in a field of twenty-two. It was succeeded as Spanish entry at the 1992 contest by "Todo esto es la música" by Serafín Zubiri.

== Chart history ==
=== Weekly charts ===
Chart (1991–1992)	Peak position
US Hot Latin Songs (Billboard)	6

=== Year-end charts ===
Chart (1991)	Position
US Hot Latin Songs (Billboard)	37

== Legacy ==
=== Other performances ===
- David Civera performed the song in the show Europasión, aired on La 1 of Televisión Española on 21 May 2008 to choose by popular vote the best song that Spain has sent to Eurovision winning the competition

=== Impersonations ===
Dalma performances singing "Bailar pegados" were recreated several times in different talent shows:

- In the first episode of the second season of Tu cara me suena aired on 1 October 2012 on Antena 3, Javier Herrero impersonated Dalma singing "Bailar pegados" replicating the performance at Eurovision.
- In the eleventh episode of the first season of Tu cara me suena aired on 2–4 December 2013 on Telefe, Pablo Granados impersonated Dalma singing "Bailar pegados" and sang in duo with him.
- In the sixteenth episode of the sixth season of Tu cara me suena aired on 2 February 2018 on Antena 3, Raúl Pérez impersonated Dalma singing "Bailar pegados" replicating the performance at Eurovision.
