= Greece in the Eurovision Song Contest 1991 =

- Eurovision Song Contest 1991
- Participating broadcaster: Hellenic Broadcasting Corporation (ERT)
- Country: Greece
- Selection process: Ellinikós Telikós 1991
- Selection date: 29 March 1991

Competing entry
- Song: "I anixi"
- Artist: Sophia Vossou
- Songwriter: Andreas Mikroutsikos

Placement
- Final result: 13th, 36 points

Participation chronology

Greece was represented at the Eurovision Song Contest 1991 with the song "I anixi" (Η άνοιξη), written by Andreas Mikroutsikos, and performed by Sophia Vossou. The Greek participating broadcaster, the Hellenic Broadcasting Corporation (ERT), selected its entry through a national final.

== Before Eurovision ==
=== Ellinikós Telikós 1991 ===
The Hellenic Broadcasting Corporation (ERT) held the national final on 29 March 1991 at its television studios in Athens, hosted by Dafni Bokota. The songs were presented as video clips and the winning song was chosen by a panel of "experts".

Final – 29 March 1991
R/O	Artist	Song	Place
1	Sophia Vossou	"I anixi"	1
2	Nikos Galatis	"Rapounzel"	—
3	Anna Vassilakopoulou	"Apopse"	—
4	Louisa Konne	"Mia melodia"	—
5	Fotis Fotiadis and Georgia Strantzou	"Koita me sta matia"	—
6	Jick Nakassian	"Paratiro"	—
7	Lia Vissi	"Agapa ti gi"	2
8	Takis Biniaris	"Opou kai na 'sai"	—
9	Giorgos Polychroniadis	"Ochi"	—
10	Nemessis	"Mazi"	—

== At Eurovision ==
Sophia Vossou performed fourth on the night of the contest, following Malta and preceding Switzerland. At the end of the contest, Greece had scored 36 points, placing 13th in a field of 22.

The contest was broadcast on ET1.

=== Voting ===
Points awarded to Greece
Score	Country
12 points	
10 points	Cyprus
8 points	
7 points	
6 points	
5 points	Malta; Spain
4 points	Israel; Yugoslavia
3 points	
2 points	Austria; Italy
1 point	Belgium; Finland; Ireland; Norway

Points awarded by Greece
Score	Country
12 points	Cyprus
10 points	Spain
8 points	France
7 points	Switzerland
6 points	Italy
5 points	Israel
4 points	Portugal
3 points	United Kingdom
2 points	Malta
1 point	Finland
