= Germany in the Eurovision Song Contest 1991 =

- Eurovision Song Contest 1991
- Participating broadcaster: ARD (Note: Arbeitsgemeinschaft der öffentlich-rechtlichen Rundfunkanstalten der Bundesrepublik Deutschland) – Sender Freies Berlin (SFB)
- Country: Germany
- Selection process: Ein Lied für Rom
- Selection date: 21 March 1991

Competing entry
- Song: "Dieser Traum darf niemals sterben"
- Artist: Atlantis 2000
- Songwriters: Helmut Frey; Alfons Weindorf

Placement
- Final result: 18th, 10 points

Participation chronology

Germany was represented at the Eurovision Song Contest 1991 with the song "Dieser Traum darf niemals sterben", composed by Alfons Weindorf, with lyrics by Helmut Frey, and performed by six-member group Atlantis 2000. The German participating broadcaster on behalf of ARD, Sender Freies Berlin (SFB), selected their entry through a national final.

== Before Eurovision ==
=== Ein Lied für Rom ===
The national final was held on 21 March 1991 at the Friedrichstadtpalast in Berlin, and hosted by Hape Kerkeling. Ten songs took part and the winner was chosen by a panel of 1,000 people, selected as providing a representative cross-section of the German public, who were telephoned and asked to choose their favourite song. One of the other participants was Cindy Berger, who had represented Germany at Eurovision in 1974 as half of duo Cindy & Bert.

The final was broadcast on Erstes Deutsches Fernsehen and on former DDR radio station Radio aktuell.

Final – 21 March 1991
R/O	Artist	Song	Songwriter(s)	Percentage	Place
1	Tanja Jonak	"Hand in Hand in die Sonne"	Jean Frankfurter, Irma Holder	9.5%	6
2	Susan Schubert	"Du bist mehr"	Willy Klüter, Anna Rubach	10.8%	5
3	Cindy Berger	"Nie allein"	Rainer Pietsch, Werne Schüler	6.4%	7
4	Barbara Cassy	"Hautnah ist nicht nah genug"	Luis Rodríguez, Peter Zentner	14.1%	4
5	Connie & Komplizen	"Jedesmal"	Dirk Schiller	2.8%	10
6	Vox & Vox	"Tief unter der Haut"	Andreas Lebbing	14.9%	3
7	Stefan de Wolff	"Herz an Herz"	Stefan de Wolff, Andreas Bärtles	3.7%	9
8	Ziad & Sandrina	"Die Wächter der Erde"	Walter J.W. Schmid, Alf Schwegeler	15.2%	2
9	Atlantis 2000	"Dieser Traum darf niemals sterben"	Alfons Weindorf, Helmut Frey	18.5%	1
10	Strandjungs	"Junge Herzen"	Marco Junger, Bernd Morawitz	4.1%	8

== At Eurovision ==
On the night of the final Atlantis 2000 performed 17th in the running order, following Finland and preceding Belgium. At the close of voting "Dieser Traum darf niemals sterben" had received only 10 points, placing Germany 18th of the 22 entries, the country's lowest Eurovision finish to that date. The German jury awarded its 12 points to contest winners Sweden.

The contest was broadcast on Erstes Deutsches Fernsehen (with commentary by Max Schautzer) and on SSVC Television. The show was watched by 6.28 million viewers in Germany.

=== Voting ===
Points awarded to Germany
Score	Country
12 points	
10 points	
8 points	
7 points	
6 points	Denmark
5 points	
4 points	
3 points	Cyprus
2 points	
1 point	Spain

Points awarded by Germany
Score	Country
12 points	Sweden
10 points	Malta
8 points	France
7 points	Spain
6 points	Switzerland
5 points	Iceland
4 points	Norway
3 points	Luxembourg
2 points	Ireland
1 point	Cyprus
