= Turkey in the Eurovision Song Contest 1991 =

Iki Dakika, Eurovision entry

- Eurovision Song Contest 1991
- Participating broadcaster: Turkish Radio and Television Corporation (TRT)
- Country: Turkey
- Selection process: 15. Eurovision Şarkı Yarışması Türkiye Finali
- Selection date: 9 March 1991

Competing entry
- Song: "İki Dakika"
- Artist: Can Uğurluer, İzel Çeliköz and Reyhan Karaca
- Songwriters: Şevket Uğurluer; Aysel Gürel

Placement
- Final result: 12th, 44 points

Participation chronology

Turkey was represented at the Eurovision Song Contest 1991 with the song "İki Dakika", composed by Şevket Uğurluer, with lyrics by Aysel Gürel, and performed by Can Uğurluer, İzel Çeliköz and Reyhan Karaca. The Turkish participating broadcaster, the Turkish Radio and Television Corporation (TRT), selected its entry through a national final.

== Before Eurovision ==
=== 15. Eurovision Şarkı Yarışması Türkiye Finali ===
The Turkish Radio and Television Corporation (TRT) held the national final on 9 March 1991 at its studios in Ankara, hosted by Bülend Özveren. Fourteen songs competed and the winner was determined by the votes of eight regional juries.

Final – 9 March 1991
R/O	Artist	Song	Lyricist	Composer	Points	Place
1	İzel Çeliköz, Reyhan Karaca & Can Uğurluer	"İki Dakika"	Aysel Gürel	Şevket Uğurluer	68	1
2	Cenk Sökmen	"Öyle Bir Dünya"	Aysel Gürel	Selçuk Başar	26	10
3	Şebnem Özsaran	"Yalnızlığım"	Müfit Bayraşa	Sadun Ersönmez	37	6
4	Grup 4x1	"Hey Sen"	Serap Turgay	Özkan Turgay	36	7
5	Fatih Erkoç	"Üzüleceksin"	Kamil Özler	Kamil Özler	4	13
6	Arzu Ece & Gür Akad	"Sessiz Geceler"	Aysel Gürel	Uğur Başar	60	2
7	Melis Sökmen & Ercüment Vural	"Son Defa"	Aysel Gürel	Uğur Başar	51	5
8	Rüya Ersavcı & Grup Turkish Delight	"Turkish Delight"	Hulki Aktunç	Dağhan Baydur	54	3
9	Sonat Bağcan	"Dün Gibi"	Bahadır Şahin	Can Atilla	9	11
10	Fatih Erkoç	"Gülbeyaz Sokağı"	Fatih Erkoç	Fatih Erkoç	27	9
11	Grup Festival	"Festival"	Aysel Gürel	Selçuk Başar	54	3
12	Cemil Sağyaşar	"Gel"	Cemil Sağyaşar	Cemil Sağyaşar	8	12
13	Cenk Sökmen	"Belki Bir Gün"	Bertan Öngören	Bertan Öngören	2	14
14	Adnan Göyken	"Hamburger"	Adnan Göyken	Adnan Göyken	28	8

Detailed Regional Jury Votes
R/O	Song	Ankara	Istanbul	İzmir	Antalya	Mersin	Diyarbakır	Trabzon	Erzurum	Total
1	"İki dakika"	4	12	7	12	7	12	10	4	68
2	"Öyle bir dünya"	8	6	1	3	2	2	4		26
3	"Yalnızlığım"	1	4	12	6	6		5	3	37
4	"Hey sen"			2	8	5	8	7	6	36
5	"Üzüleceksin"		3			1				4
6	"Sessiz geceler"	3	7	6	5	12	5	12	10	60
7	"Son defa"	12	8	5	4	8	3	6	5	51
8	"Turkish Delight"	10		8	10	4	7	8	7	54
9	"Dün gibi"	6	1				1		1	9
10	"Gülbeyaz sokağı"	7	10	3		3		2	2	27
11	"Festival"	5	5	10	7	10	6	3	8	54
12	"Gel"		2		1		4	1		8
13	"Belki bir gün"	2								2
14	"Hamburger"			4	2		10		12	28

== At Eurovision ==
On the night of the contest the trio performed 10th in the running order following France and preceding Ireland. At the close of the voting the song had received 44 points placing Turkey 12th. 7 participants had voted for İki Dakika. The Turkish jury awarded its 12 points to Israel.

=== Voting ===
Points awarded to Turkey
Score	Country
12 points	
10 points	
8 points	Denmark; Italy
7 points	France; Israel; Malta
6 points	
5 points	United Kingdom
4 points	
3 points	
2 points	Spain
1 point	

Points awarded by Turkey
Score	Country
12 points	Israel
10 points	Italy
8 points	Spain
7 points	Malta
6 points	Sweden
5 points	Portugal
4 points	Ireland
3 points	Luxembourg
2 points	Switzerland
1 point	Norway
