= Eurovision Song Contest 1991 =

International song competition

Date and venue
- Final: 4 May 1991
- Venue: Stage 15; Cinecittà Studios; Rome, Italy

Organisation
- Organiser: European Broadcasting Union (EBU)
- Scrutineer: Frank Naef

Production
- Host broadcaster: Radiotelevisione italiana (RAI)
- Director: Riccardo Donna
- Executive producer: Silvia Salvetti
- Musical director: Bruno Canfora
- Presenters: Gigliola Cinquetti; Toto Cutugno

Participants
- Number of entries: 22
- Returning countries: Malta
- Non-returning countries: Netherlands
- Participation map: Competing countries Countries that participated in the past but not in 1991

Vote
- Voting system: Each country awarded 12, 10, 8-1 point(s) to their 10 favourite songs
- Winning song: Sweden "Fångad av en stormvind"

The Eurovision Song Contest 1991 was the 36th edition of the Eurovision Song Contest, held on 4 May 1991 at Stage 15 of the Cinecittà Studios in Rome, Italy, and presented by Gigliola Cinquetti and Toto Cutugno. It was organised by the European Broadcasting Union (EBU) and host broadcaster Radiotelevisione italiana (RAI), who staged the event after winning the 1990 contest for Italy with the song "Insieme: 1992" by Cutugno. Cinquetti had also won the contest for Italy in 1964.

Broadcasters from twenty-two countries participated in the contest, with Malta making its first appearance in sixteen years, having last participated in 1975, while the Netherlands decided not to participate because the date of the event coincided with the country's Remembrance of the Dead commemorations. It was also the first time that Germany was represented as a single state following the reunification of East and West Germany.

For the first time since 1969, the contest resulted in a draw for first place, with both France and Sweden being awarded the same number of points. The contest's tie-break procedure was implemented for the first time in its history, which resulted in Sweden being declared the winner because its entry, "Fångad av en stormvind", written by Stephan Berg and performed by Carola, had received a greater number of top scores from the other competing countries than the French entry; it was Sweden's third win in the contest overall. Alongside France, Israel, Spain and Switzerland rounded out the top five.

== Location ==
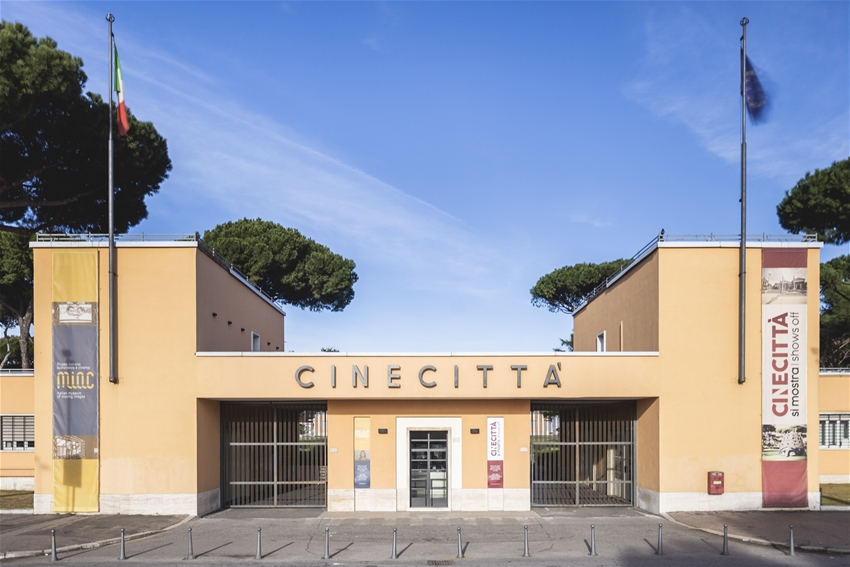
Entrance to the Cinecittà Studios, Rome – host venue of the 1991 contest

Location of Sanremo (the original host city) and the capital, Rome (the eventual host city).

The 1991 contest took place in Rome, Italy, following the country's victory at the 1990 contest with the song "Insieme: 1992", performed by Toto Cutugno. It was the second time that Italy had hosted the contest, following the 1965 event held in Naples. Prior to the 1990 contest, the EBU had considered the idea of only having the winner of the previous contest host an edition every second year, with the host broadcaster of odd numbered years being chosen through a bidding process. Belgrade and Amsterdam had shown interest in hosting the 1991 contest, but ultimately Italy was chosen to host after winning the contest. The chosen venue was Stage 15 of the Cinecittà Studios, the largest film studios in Europe which had previously been the filming location for several American and Italian blockbuster films, particularly during the 1950s and 1960s.

The Italian organisers had originally intended that the contest be held in the Teatro Ariston in Sanremo, where the annual Sanremo Music Festival is held. The Sanremo festival had been a major influence and inspiration for the formation of the Eurovision Song Contest, and RAI had wanted to pay tribute to the contest's origins by hosting the event in the town. The choice of Sanremo and Ariston as host of the event was initially rejected by the EBU, citing concerns regarding the size of the venue as well as organisational and security shortcomings. In an effort to address some of the concerns, the comune of Sanremo proposed hosting the event in three locations across the Ariston area, with the Teatro Ariston, Piazza Colombo and the old flower market on Corso Garibaldi being combined using temporary structures to form a single venue. Although plans to hold the contest in Sanremo continued to be developed as late as January 1991, by February doubts over the feasibility of holding the event in Sanremo became insurmountable, due to instability in the Middle East and the outbreak of the Gulf War, and ultimately the organisers opted to relocate the contest to a more secure location, eventually confirming on 18 February that the event would be held in Rome. Despite the relocation, Sanremo remained a partner of the 1991 contest and pre-recorded footage of the city was featured during the live broadcast.

== Participants ==
Eurovision Song Contest 1991 – Participation summaries by country
- Austria; Belgium; Cyprus; Denmark; Finland; France; Germany; Greece; Iceland; Ireland; Israel; Italy; Luxembourg; Malta; Norway; Portugal; Spain; Sweden; Switzerland; Turkey; United Kingdom; Yugoslavia

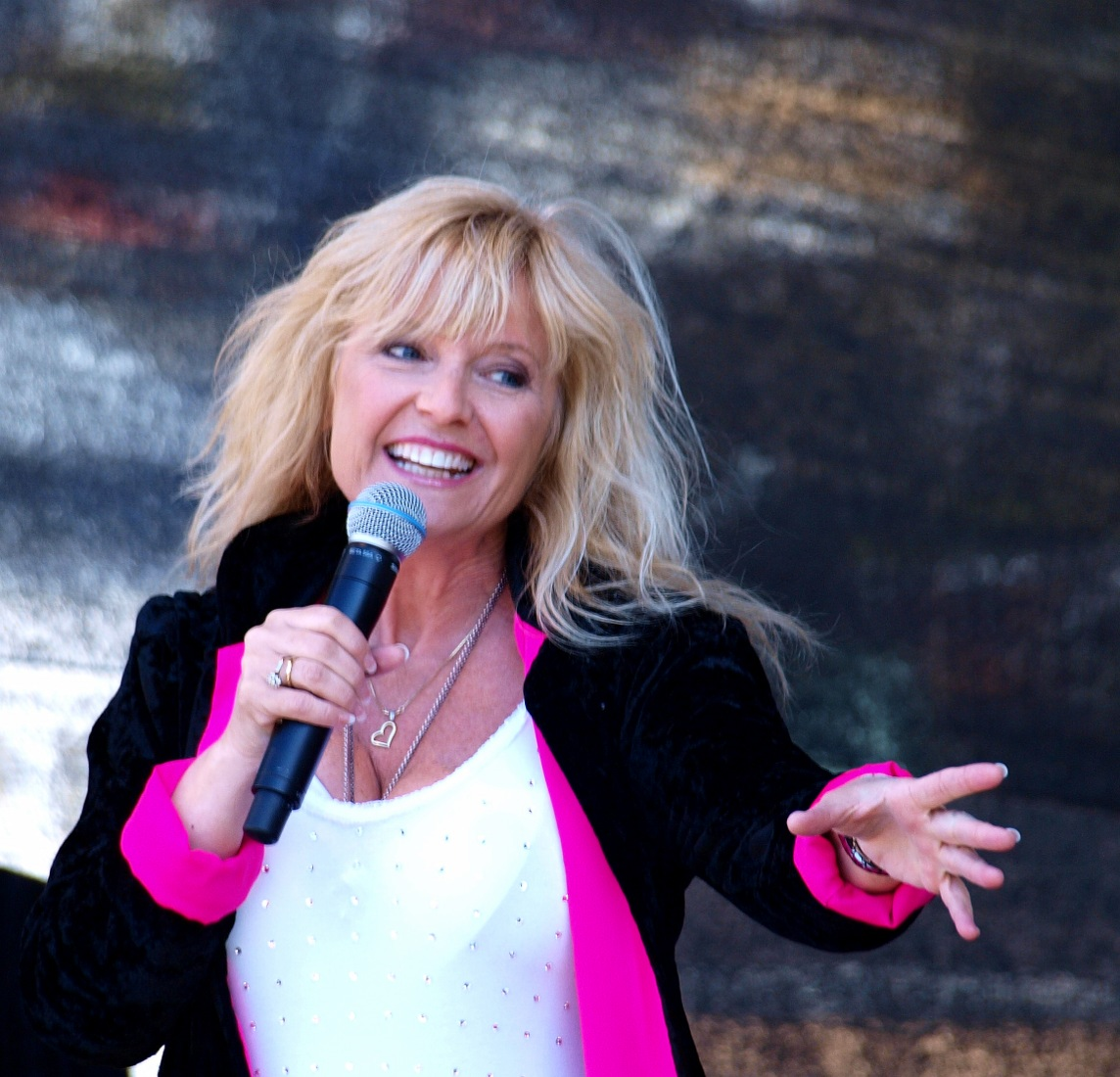
Hanne Krogh (pictured in 2010), winner of the 1985 contest with the group Bobbysocks! for Norway, participated again in 1991 as a member of Just 4 Fun.

A total of twenty-two countries participated in the 1991 contest. Of the countries that participated in 1990, the Netherlands were the only country that failed to make a return, as the date of the contest clashed with the country's Remembrance of the Dead commemorations. Malta – which had last participated in the contest sixteen years before, in 1975 – ultimately filled the vacant slot. Malta had attempted to make a return to the contest before; however, it was prevented from doing so due to the cap on participation numbers set by the EBU.

This contest marked the first time that Germany competed as a unified country, following the reunification of East and West Germany into a single state; until this point all German entrants in previous contests had represented the former West Germany.

Several artists that had previously competed in the contest returned to participate in this year's event: Stefán Hilmarsson, who competed alongside Eyjólfur Kristjánsson for Iceland, was a member of Beathoven who had represented Iceland in Dublin 1988; Thomas Forstner made a second appearance for Austria following the 1989 contest; Carola also returned for the second time for Sweden after her participation in 1983; and the members of Norway's Just 4 Fun featured two previous participating artists, namely Eiríkur Hauksson, who had competed in the 1986 for Iceland as part of the group ICY, and Hanne Krogh, who had represented Norway twice before, in 1971 as a solo artist and in 1985 as a member of the group Bobbysocks!, the latter appearance ultimately winning the contest outright. Additionally, Kit Rolfe performed as backing vocalist for the United Kingdom's Samantha Janus, having previously been lead vocalist of the group Belle and the Devotions that had represented the UK at the 1984 contest.

Eurovision Song Contest 1991 participants
Country	Broadcaster	Artist	Song	Language	Songwriter(s)	Conductor
Austria	ORF	Thomas Forstner	"Venedig im Regen"	German	Wolfgang Eltner; Hubert Moser; Robby Musenbichler	Richard Oesterreicher
Belgium	BRTN	Clouseau	"Geef het op"	Dutch	Jan Leyers; Bob Savenberg; Koen Wauters; Kris Wauters	Roland Verlooven
Cyprus	CyBC	Elena Patroklou	"S.O.S."	Greek	Kypros Charalambous; Andreas Christou	Alexander Kirov Zografov
Denmark	DR	Anders Frandsen	"Lige der hvor hjertet slår"	Danish	Michael Elo	Henrik Krogsgaard
Finland	YLE	Kaija	"Hullu yö"	Finnish	Ile Kallio; Jukka Välimaa	Olli Ahvenlahti
France	Antenne 2	Amina	"C'est le dernier qui a parlé qui a raison"	French	Amina Annabi; Wasis Diop	Jérôme Pillement
Germany	SFB (Note: On behalf of the German public broadcasting consortium ARD)	Atlantis 2000	"Dieser Traum darf niemals sterben"	German	Helmut Frey; Alfons Weindorf	Hermann Weindorf
Greece	ERT	Sophia Vossou	"Anixi" (Άνοιξη)	Greek	Andreas Mikroutsikos	Haris Andreadis
Iceland	RÚV	Stefán and Eyfi	"Nína"	Icelandic	Eyjólfur Kristjánsson	Jón Ólafsson
Ireland	RTÉ	Kim Jackson	"Could It Be That I'm in Love"	English	Liam Reilly	Noel Kelehan
Israel	IBA	Duo Datz	"Kan" (כאן)	Hebrew	Uzi Hitman	Kobi Oshrat
Italy	RAI	Peppino di Capri	"Comme è ddoce 'o mare"	Neapolitan	Giampiero Artegiani; Marcello Marocchi	Bruno Canfora
Luxembourg	CLT	Sarah Bray	"Un baiser volé"	French	Patrick Hippert; Linda Lecomte; Mick Wersant	Francis Goya
Malta	PBS	Paul Giordimaina and Georgina	"Could It Be"	English	Paul Abela; Raymond Mahoney	Paul Abela
Norway	NRK	Just 4 Fun	"Mrs. Thompson"	Norwegian	Dag Kolsrud; P.G. Roness; Kaare Skevik Jr.	Pete Knutsen
Portugal	RTP	Dulce	"Lusitana paixão"	Portuguese	Fred Micaelo; Zé da Ponte; Jorge Quintela	Fernando Correia Martins
Spain	TVE	Sergio Dalma	"Bailar pegados"	Spanish	Luis Gómez-Escolar; Julio Seijas	Eduardo Leiva
Sweden	SVT	Carola	"Fångad av en stormvind"	Swedish	Stephan Berg	Anders Berglund
Switzerland	SRG SSR	Sandra Simó	"Canzone per te"	Italian	Renato Mascetti	Flaviano Cuffari
Turkey	TRT	Can Uğurluer, İzel Çeliköz and Reyhan Karaca	"İki Dakika"	Turkish	Aysel Gürel; Şevket Uğurluer	Turhan Yükseler
United Kingdom	BBC	Samantha Janus	"A Message to Your Heart"	English	Paul Curtis	Ronnie Hazlehurst
Yugoslavia	JRT	Baby Doll	"Brazil" (Бразил)	Serbo-Croatian	Dragana Šarić; Zoran Vračević	Slobodan Marković

== Production ==
The Eurovision Song Contest 1991 was produced by the Italian public broadcaster Radiotelevisione italiana (RAI). Silvia Salvetti was the executive producer, Riccardo Donna was the director, Luciano Ricceri served as designer, and Bruno Canfora was the musical director leading an assembled orchestra of 57 musicians. A separate musical director could be nominated by each participating delegation to lead the orchestra during its country's performance, with the host musical director also available to conduct for those countries which did not nominate their own conductor. On behalf of the contest organisers, the European Broadcasting Union (EBU), the event was overseen by Frank Naef as scrutineer.

The running order draw, to determine in which position each country would perform, was held on 18 February 1991, the same date that Rome was confirmed as the host city of the contest and the announcement of the twenty-two competing countries.

Rehearsals for the participating artists began on 29 April 1991. Two technical rehearsals were conducted for each participating delegation in the week approaching the contest, with countries rehearsing in the order in which they would perform. The first rehearsals of 40 minutes' duration were held on 29 and 30 April, with the second rehearsals, each lasting 35 minutes, held on 1 and 2 May. Three dress rehearsals were held with all artists, two held in the afternoon and evening of 3 May and one final rehearsal in the afternoon of 4 May. An audience was present for the second dress rehearsal on the evening of 3 May. About 300 journalists covered the event.

The production value of the 1991 contest came in for much criticism during the build-up and following the event, which may be partly explained by the relatively late change in contest venue from Sanremo to Rome. Rehearsals in the contest venue regularly started late as the orchestra failed on many occasions to arrive at the venue on time, and during the live broadcast, a number of technical mishaps occurred, including lighting failure during several of the entries and the failure of the venue's sound system during the Swedish entry. The voting sequence was also notably haphazard and several mistakes required rectification during the show, with Naef regularly called upon by the presenters for clarification.

== Format ==
Each participating broadcaster submitted one song, which was required to be no longer than three minutes in duration and performed in the language, or one of the languages, of the country which it represented. A maximum of six performers were allowed on stage during each country's performance, and all participants were required to have reached the age of 16 in the year of the contest. Each entry could utilise all or part of the live orchestra and could use instrumental-only backing tracks, however any backing tracks used could only include the sound of instruments featured on stage being mimed by the performers.

The results of the 1991 contest were determined through the same scoring system as had first been introduced in 1975: each country awarded twelve points to its favourite entry, followed by ten points to its second favourite, and then awarded points in decreasing value from eight to one for the remaining songs which featured in the country's top ten, with countries unable to vote for their own entry. The points awarded by each country were determined by an assembled jury of sixteen individuals, which was required to be split evenly between men and women and by age. Each jury member voted in secret and awarded between one and ten votes to each participating song, excluding that from their own country and with no abstentions permitted. The votes of each member were collected following the country's performance and then tallied by the non-voting jury chairperson to determine the points to be awarded. In any cases where two or more songs in the top ten received the same number of votes, a show of hands by all jury members was used to determine the final placing. In a change to the rules compared to previous editions, half of the jury members in each country were now represented by music experts, comprising among other professions singers, composers, lyricists, musicians, conductors, music journalists, record company employees and radio or television producers. Only two members in each country were allowed to come from record companies, and no employees of the participating broadcasters themselves were allowed to sit on the juries.

=== Postcards ===
Each entry was preceded by a video postcard which served as an introduction to each country, as well as providing an opportunity for transition between entries and allow stage crew to make changes on stage. The postcards for the 1991 contest featured pre-recorded clips of the competing artists performing short sections from Italian songs, superimposed onto images of Italian landmarks and locations which were intended to represent the artists' personalities. The song each artist performed during their postcard is listed below by order of performance, alongside the originator of the song in brackets:

1. Yugoslavia – "Non ho l'età" (Gigliola Cinquetti)
2. Iceland – "Se bastasse una canzone" (Eros Ramazzotti)
3. Malta – "Questo piccolo grande amore" (Claudio Baglioni)
4. Greece – "Caruso" (Lucio Dalla)
5. Switzerland – "Un'estate italiana" (Edoardo Bennato and Gianna Nannini)
6. Austria – "Adesso tu" (Eros Ramazzotti)
7. Luxembourg – "Sarà perché ti amo" (Ricchi e Poveri)
8. Sweden – "Non voglio mica la luna" (Fiordaliso)
9. France – "La partita di pallone" (Rita Pavone)
10. Turkey – "Amore scusami" (John Foster)
11. Ireland – "Nel blu, dipinto di blu" (Domenico Modugno)
12. Portugal – "Dio, come ti amo" (Domenico Modugno / Gigliola Cinquetti)
13. Denmark – "Nessun dorma" (from Giacomo Puccini's opera Turandot)
14. Norway – "Santa Lucia" (traditional)
15. Israel – "Lontano dagli occhi" (Sergio Endrigo / Mary Hopkin)
16. Finland – "Maruzzella" (Renato Carosone)
17. Germany – "L'Italiano" (Toto Cutugno)
18. Belgium – "Musica è" (Eros Ramazzotti)
19. Spain – "Sono tremendo" (Rocky Roberts)
20. United Kingdom – "Ricordati di me" (Antonello Venditti)
21. Cyprus – "Io che amo solo te" (Sergio Endrigo)
22. Italy – "Champagne" (Peppino di Capri)

== Contest overview ==
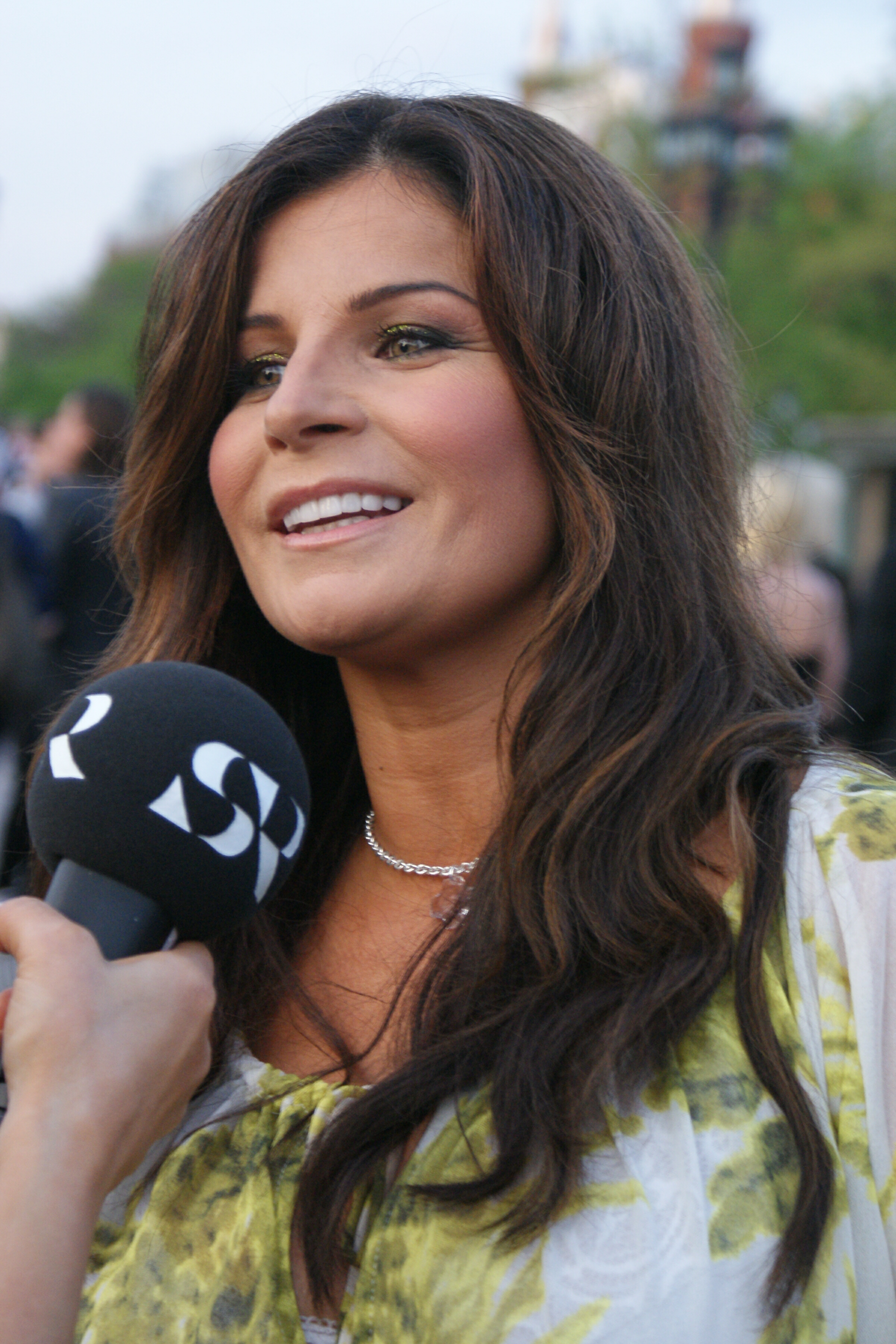
Sweden's Carola (pictured in 2009) won the contest following a draw for first place and a tie-break procedure being implemented.

The contest took place on 4 May 1991 at 21:00 (CEST) with a duration of 3 hours and 13 minutes. The show was presented by the Italian singers Gigliola Cinquetti and Toto Cutugno, the two artists which up until this point had won the contest for Italy in 1964 and 1990 respectively. Unlike the majority of previous contest presenters, who had conducted the events in English and French, for the majority of the 1991 contest the two presenters spoke solely in Italian, with only the voting sequence being conducted in Italian, English, and French.

The opening of the contest featured a pre-recorded music video of the American singer Sara Carlson performing "Celebration", which was followed by live performances from the contest hosts of their Eurovision winning songs, Cutugno's "Insieme: 1992" and Cinquetti's "Non ho l'età". The interval act comprised a performance by the Italian quick-change artist and illusionist Arturo Brachetti. The trophy awarded to the winners was presented at the end of the broadcast by Albert Scharf as the President of the European Broadcasting Union.

The winner was Sweden represented by the song "Fångad av en stormvind", written by Stephan Berg and performed by Carola. It was Sweden's third contest victory, following wins in 1974 and 1984. For the first time since 1969, and for only the second time ever in the contest's history, the voting sequence resulted in a draw for first place, with both France and Sweden finishing with 146 points each. The tie-break rules introduced for the 1989 contest were thus enacted: for any ties for first place the country which received the most 12 points would be declared the winner; if a tie still remained after examining the 12 points, each country's 10 points would then be compared to determine a winner. Both France and Sweden had scored four 12 point scores, however as Sweden had scored five 10 points compared to France's two they were declared the winners. During the traditional winner's reprise performance, Carola performed part of the winning song in English, with lyrics written by Richard Hampton.

Results of the Eurovision Song Contest 1991
R/O	Country	Artist	Song	Points	Place
1	Yugoslavia	Baby Doll	"Brazil"	1	21
2	Iceland	Stefán and Eyfi	"Nína"	26	15
3	Malta	Paul Giordimaina and Georgina	"Could It Be"	106	6
4	Greece	Sophia Vossou	"Anixi"	36	13
5	Switzerland	Sandra Simó	"Canzone per te"	118	5
6	Austria	Thomas Forstner	"Venedig im Regen"	0	22
7	Luxembourg	Sarah Bray	"Un baiser volé"	29	14
8	Sweden	Carola	"Fångad av en stormvind"	146	1
9	France	Amina	"C'est le dernier qui a parlé qui a raison"	146	2
10	Turkey	Can Uğurluer, İzel Çeliköz and Reyhan Karaca	"İki Dakika"	44	12
11	Ireland	Kim Jackson	"Could It Be That I'm in Love"	47	10
12	Portugal	Dulce	"Lusitana paixão"	62	8
13	Denmark	Anders Frandsen	"Lige der hvor hjertet slår"	8	19
14	Norway	Just 4 Fun	"Mrs. Thompson"	14	17
15	Israel	Duo Datz	"Kan"	139	3
16	Finland	Kaija	"Hullu yö"	6	20
17	Germany	Atlantis 2000	"Dieser Traum darf niemals sterben"	10	18
18	Belgium	Clouseau	"Geef het op"	23	16
19	Spain	Sergio Dalma	"Bailar pegados"	119	4
20	United Kingdom	Samantha Janus	"A Message to Your Heart"	47	10
21	Cyprus	Elena Patroklou	"S.O.S."	60	9
22	Italy	Peppino di Capri	"Comme è ddoce 'o mare"	89	7

=== Spokespersons ===
Each participating broadcaster appointed a spokesperson, connected to the contest venue via telephone lines and responsible for announcing, in English or French, the votes for its respective country. Known spokespersons at the 1991 contest are listed below.

- Finland – Heidi Kokki
- Ireland – Eileen Dunne
- Italy – Rosanna Vaudetti
- Luxembourg – Jean-Luc Bertrand
- Malta – Dominic Micallef
- Sweden – Bo Hagström
- Turkey – Canan Kumbasar
- United Kingdom – Colin Berry

== Detailed voting results ==
Jury voting was used to determine the points awarded by all countries. The announcement of the results from each country was conducted in the order in which they performed, with the spokespersons announcing their country's points in English or French in ascending order. The detailed breakdown of the points awarded by each country is listed in the tables below.

Detailed voting results of the Eurovision Song Contest 1991
		Total score	Yugoslavia	Iceland	Malta	Greece	Switzerland	Austria	Luxembourg	Sweden	France	Turkey	Ireland	Portugal	Denmark	Norway	Israel	Finland	Germany	Belgium	Spain	United Kingdom	Cyprus	Italy
Contestants	Yugoslavia	1			1																			
Contestants	Iceland	26					4			10									5					7
Contestants	Malta	106	1			2	6	4	10	**12**	2	7	**12**	7		6			10	4	6	7		10
Contestants	Greece	36	4		5			2					1			1	4	1		1	5		10	2
Contestants	Switzerland	118	5	5		7		8	**12**	8	4	2	2	6	5	3	8	5	6	**12**		8	8	4
Contestants	Austria	0																						
Contestants	Luxembourg	29		4				5		1		3		2	4				3	2		3	2	
Contestants	Sweden	**146**	6	**12**			10	10	7			6	3	10	**12**	8	10	8	**12**	10	4	**12**	6	
Contestants	France	146	10	7	3	8	7	**12**		5			7	5		**12**	**12**	10	8	7	8	6	7	**12**
Contestants	Turkey	44			7						7				8		7				2	5		8
Contestants	Ireland	47	3		4		3	1	8			4			7		1	2	2	5		4		3
Contestants	Portugal	62		8		4	1		2	7	10	5			1	2		7			10		4	1
Contestants	Denmark	8								3						5								
Contestants	Norway	14		6					1			1			2				4					
Contestants	Israel	139	**12**	10	8	5	8		5	6	3	**12**	8	4	10	7		6		8	**12**	10	5	
Contestants	Finland	6		1		1							4											
Contestants	Germany	10													6						1		3	
Contestants	Belgium	23						3		2	5							3			3	2		5
Contestants	Spain	119	8	2	6	10	**12**	7	6	4	6	8	6	8		4	2	4	7	6		1	**12**	
Contestants	United Kingdom	47			10	3	5	6	3		1			1	3		5			3			1	6
Contestants	Cyprus	60	2	3	**12**	**12**			4		**12**		5	3			6		1					
Contestants	Italy	89	7		2	6	2				8	10	10	**12**		10	3	**12**			7			

=== 12 points ===
The below table summarises how the maximum 12 points were awarded from one country to another. The winning country is shown in bold. France and Sweden each received the maximum score of 12 points from four of the voting countries, with Cyprus and Israel receiving three sets of 12 points each, and Italy, Malta, Spain and Switzerland each receiving two sets of maximum scores.

Distribution of 12 points awarded at the Eurovision Song Contest 1991
N.	Contestant	Nation(s) giving 12 points
4	France	Austria, Israel, Italy, Norway
4	**Sweden**	Denmark, Germany, Iceland, United Kingdom
3	Cyprus	France, Greece, Malta
3	Israel	Spain, Turkey, Yugoslavia
2	Italy	Finland, Portugal
2	Malta	Ireland, Sweden
2	Spain	Cyprus, Switzerland
2	Switzerland	Belgium, Luxembourg

== Broadcasts ==
Each participating broadcaster was required to relay the contest via its networks. Non-participating member broadcasters were also able to relay the contest as "passive participants". Broadcasters were able to send commentators to provide coverage of the contest in their own native language and to relay information about the artists and songs to their television viewers. These commentators were typically sent to the venue to report on the event, and were able to provide commentary from small booths constructed at the back of the venue.

In addition to the participating countries, the contest was also reportedly broadcast in Bulgaria, Czechoslovakia, Hungary, Poland, Romania and the Soviet Union via Intervision, and in Australia, Cape Verde, Guinea-Bissau, Mozambique, South Africa and South Korea, with an estimated global audience of up to 800 million viewers.

Known details on the broadcasts in each country, including the specific broadcasting stations and commentators are shown in the tables below.

Broadcasters and commentators in participating countries
Country	Broadcaster	Channel(s)	Commentator(s)	Ref.
Austria	ORF	FS1		
Belgium	BRTN	TV1, TV2	André Vermeulen	
Belgium	BRTN	Radio 2		
Belgium	RTBF	RTBF1	Claude Delacroix	
Cyprus	CyBC	RIK, A Programma	Evi Papamichail	
Denmark	DR	DR TV	Camilla Miehe-Renard	
Denmark	DR	DR P3	Jesper Bæhrenz and Andrew Jensen	
Finland	YLE	TV1	Erkki Pohjanheimo	
Finland	YLE	Radiomafia	Kai Ristola	
Finland	YLE	Riksradion	Johan Finne, Paul Olin and Wille Wilenius	
France	Antenne 2		Léon Zitrone	
Germany	ARD	Erstes Deutsches Fernsehen	Max Schautzer	
Germany	SSVC	SSVC Television		
Greece	ERT	ET1		
Iceland	RÚV	Sjónvarpið, Rás 2	Arthúr Björgvin Bollason	
Ireland	RTÉ	RTÉ 1	Pat Kenny	
Ireland	RTÉ	RTÉ Radio 1	Larry Gogan	
Israel	IBA	Israeli Television, Reshet Gimel		
Italy	RAI	Rai Uno	No commentary	
Luxembourg	CLT	RTL TV, RTL Lorraine		
Malta	PBS	TVM		
Norway	NRK	NRK Fjernsynet, NRK P2	John Andreassen and Jahn Teigen	
Portugal	RTP	RTP Canal 1		
Spain	TVE	TVE 2	Tomás Fernando Flores	
Sweden	SVT	TV2	Harald Treutiger	
Sweden	RR	SR P3	Rune Hallberg and Kalle Oldby	
Switzerland	SRG SSR	TV DRS	Bernard Thurnheer	
Switzerland	SRG SSR	TSR Chaîne nationale (Note: Broadcast through a second audio programme on TV DRS)	Lolita Morena	
Switzerland	SRG SSR	TSI Canale nationale		
Turkey	TRT	TV1		
United Kingdom	BBC	BBC1 (Note: Additional live broadcast on BBC World Service Television)	Terry Wogan	
United Kingdom	BBC	BBC Radio 2	Ken Bruce	
Yugoslavia	JRT	TV Beograd 1, TVCG 1, TV Novi Sad, TV Prishtina	Mladen Popović	
Yugoslavia	JRT	HTV 1, (Note: Delayed broadcast by HTV due to nationwide mourning within Croatia following the deaths of Croatian police officers, as part of the wider Croatian War of Independence) TV Sarajevo 1, TV Slovenija 1, TV Skopje 1	Ksenija Urličić	

Broadcasters and commentators in non-participating countries
Country	Broadcaster	Channel(s)	Commentator(s)	Ref.
Australia	SBS	SBS TV (Note: Deferred broadcast the following day at 14:30 (AEST))		
Czechoslovakia	ČST	ČTV, (Note: Delayed broadcast on 27 July 1991 at 21:25 (CEST)) S1		
Faroe Islands	SvF			
Greenland	KNR	KNR (Note: Deferred broadcast at 21:10 (WGST))		
Hungary	MTV	MTV1	István Vágó	
Poland	TP	TP1		
Romania	TVR	TVR 1		
South Korea	KBS	KBS2 (Note: Delayed broadcast on 11 May 1991 at 20:00 (KST))		
Soviet Union	CT USSR	Programme One (Note: Also broadcast deferred via the Orbita satellite broadcasting system in the Soviet Far East)		
Soviet Union	ETV			

== Notes and references ==
=== Bibliography ===
- Murtomäki, Asko (2007). Finland 12 points! Suomen Euroviisut (in Finnish). Helsinki, Finland: Teos. ISBN 951-851-106-3.
- O'Connor, John Kennedy (2010). The Eurovision Song Contest: The Official History (2nd ed.). London, United Kingdom: Carlton Books. ISBN 978-1-84732-521-1.
- Raykoff, Ivan; Tobin, Robert Deam (2007). A Song for Europe: Popular Music and Politics in the Eurovision Song Contest. Farnham, United Kingdom: Ashgate Publishing. ISBN 978-0-7546-5878-8.
- Roxburgh, Gordon (2016). Songs for Europe: The United Kingdom at the Eurovision Song Contest. Vol. Three: The 1980s. Prestatyn, United Kingdom: Telos Publishing. ISBN 978-1-84583-118-9.
- Roxburgh, Gordon (2020). Songs for Europe: The United Kingdom at the Eurovision Song Contest. Vol. Four: The 1990s. Prestatyn, United Kingdom: Telos Publishing. ISBN 978-1-84583-163-9.
- Thorsson, Leif; Verhage, Martin (2006). Melodifestivalen genom tiderna : de svenska uttagningarna och internationella finalerna [Melodifestivalen through the ages: the Swedish selections and international finals] (in Swedish). Stockholm, Sweden: Premium Publishing. ISBN 91-89136-29-2.
