= United Kingdom in the Eurovision Song Contest 1991 =

- Eurovision Song Contest 1991
- Participating broadcaster: British Broadcasting Corporation (BBC)
- Country: United Kingdom
- Selection process: A Song for Europe 1991
- Selection date: 29 March 1991

Competing entry
- Song: "A Message to Your Heart"
- Artist: Samantha Janus
- Songwriter: Paul Curtis

Placement
- Final result: 10th, 47 points

Participation chronology

The United Kingdom was represented at the Eurovision Song Contest 1991 with the song "A Message to Your Heart", written by Paul Curtis, and performed by Samantha Janus. The British participating broadcaster, the British Broadcasting Corporation (BBC), selected its entry through a national final.

== Before Eurovision ==
=== A Song for Europe 1991 ===
The British Broadcasting Corporation (BBC) held A Song for Europe 1991 on 29 March 1991, hosted by Terry Wogan. Following the somewhat negative comments by one member of the celebrity panel in 1990, the panel idea was dropped in 1991. The BBC Concert Orchestra under the direction of Ronnie Hazlehurst as conductor accompanied all the songs, the musicians appearing on camera for the first time since 1978.

The eight songs in contention to represent the United Kingdom were presented during Terry Wogan's Wogan chat show on BBC1. Two songs were presented during each of four broadcasts between 20 and 27 March.

A separate results show was broadcast on BBC1 the same evening. BBC Radio 2 simulcast the final, with commentary by Ken Bruce, but did not broadcast the results show.

Malcolm Roberts had been one of six singers who had jointly represented Luxembourg in the Eurovision Song Contest 1985, thus becoming the second entrant in a British national final to have participated in Eurovision for another nation, after Dan Duskey (aka Michael Palace) in 1986.

A Song for Europe 1991 – 29 March 1991
| R/O | Artist | Song | Composer(s) | Televote | Place |
|---|---|---|---|---|---|
| 1 | The Ravenscroft Partnership | "We Will Protect You" | Raf Ravenscroft, Julian Littman, R. Young | 36,047 | 5 |
| 2 | Christopher Ellis | "Straight to Your Heart" | Christopher Ellis | 14,231 | 7 |
| 3 | Samantha Janus | "A Message to Your Heart" | Paul Curtis | 108,896 | 1 |
| 4 | Christie | "Nothing On This Earth" | Nigel Stock | 17,296 | 6 |
| 5 | Malcolm Roberts | "One Love" | Malcolm Roberts | 11,250 | 8 |
| 6 | Lorraine Craig | "A Little Bit of Heaven" | Tony Moore | 61,589 | 3 |
| 7 | Julie Finney | "True Love" | Bim Sinclair, Bud Sinclair | 58,146 | 4 |
| 8 | Brendan Faye | "Lover Come In" | Brendan Faye | 95,696 | 2 |

== At Eurovision ==
Samantha Janus went on to represent United Kingdom in the Eurovision Song Contest 1991, she performed 20th on the night, after Spain and before Cyprus, finishing 10th with 47 points. Her backing singers on the night (as they had been in the UK final) were Zoe Picot, Lucy Moorby and Lyn Paul's sister Nikki Belcher. They were supported at the back of the stage by session singers Hazell Dean and former Belle and the Devotions lead singer Kit Rolfe.

The contest was broadcast on BBC1 and BBC World Service Television (with commentary by Terry Wogan) and on radio station BBC Radio 2 (with commentary by Ken Bruce)

=== Voting ===
Points awarded to the United Kingdom
| Score | Country |
|---|---|
| 12 points | |
| 10 points | Malta |
| 8 points | |
| 7 points | |
| 6 points | Austria; Italy |
| 5 points | Israel; Switzerland |
| 4 points | |
| 3 points | Belgium; Denmark; Greece; Luxembourg |
| 2 points | |
| 1 point | Cyprus; France; Portugal |

Points awarded by the United Kingdom
| Score | Country |
|---|---|
| 12 points | Sweden |
| 10 points | Israel |
| 8 points | Switzerland |
| 7 points | Malta |
| 6 points | France |
| 5 points | Turkey |
| 4 points | Ireland |
| 3 points | Luxembourg |
| 2 points | Belgium |
| 1 point | Spain |
