= Anders Frandsen =

Danish musician, actor and TV presenter

- Born: 8 December 1960; Copenhagen, Denmark
- Died: 1 January 2012 (aged 51); Hellerup, Denmark
- Occupations: Singer; actor; tv-presenter

Anders Frandsen (8 December 1960 – c. 1 January 2012) was a Danish musician, singer, actor and TV presenter. He was born in Copenhagen.

== Career ==
Although Frandsen was not a trained actor, he appeared in theatre performances during the 1980s. He later became a TV presenter on Danish Kanal 2, alongside Camilla Miehe-Renard.

In 1991 he came to fame when he won the Dansk Melodi Grand Prix (the Danish national final for the Eurovision Song Contest) with the song Lige der hvor hjertet slår, composed by Michael Elo. The song didn't do well at the Eurovision Song Contest 1991, and placed 19th with only 8 points. That didn't hurt his popularity however, and the following year at the Danish national final, he was the host.

He then became a TV host on TV3 for the next few years. He appeared on many shows, such as "Knald eller Fald" (a dating programme) and "Stjerneskud" (a talent competition for look-alikes), and also presented the network's morning TV. In 1997, he slowly disappeared from TV again.

He later resurfaced at the Danish Melodi Grand Prix final in 2001, presenting one of the songs, and also guest-starred in an episode of Ørnen (a Danish TV series) in 2004. In 2005 he guest-starred in an episode of the Danish TV show Twist & Shout, on TV2 Charlie.

== Death ==
On the evening of 1 January 2012, Frandsen was found lifeless in his Hellerup apartment by friends, who called emergency services, who pronounced him dead on site. Frandsen had brought a garden barbecue into his bedroom and lit it, causing death by carbon monoxide poisoning. A suicide note was also discovered, but the exact time of death is not known. Frandsen was 51.

Preceded by Lonnie Devantier with Hallo Hallo	Denmark in the Eurovision Song Contest; 1991	Succeeded by Lotte Nilsson & Kenny Lübcke with Alt det som ingen ser
