= Kaija Kärkinen =

Finnish singer and actress (born 1962)

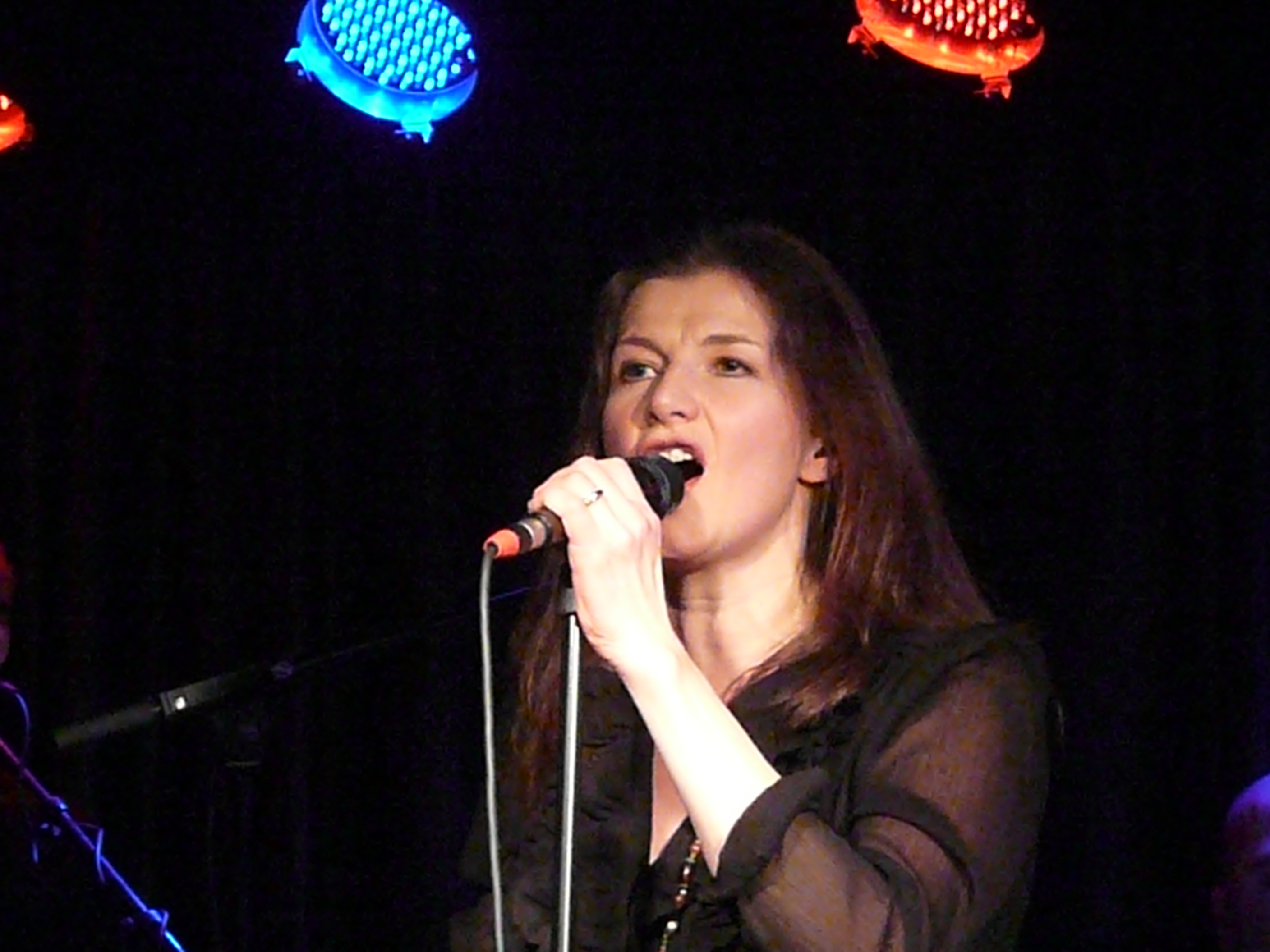
- Kaija Kärkinen during her concert in Mikkeli.

Background information
- Born: 9 September 1962 (age 63); Sodankylä, Finland
- Occupations: singer, actress

Kaija Kärkinen (born 9 September 1962) is a Finnish singer and actress. She represented Finland in the Eurovision Song Contest 1991, with the song "Hullu yö", finishing 20th.

Kärkinen was born in Sodankylä. She started her career in the group Lato as a vocalist. After her Eurovision appearance, she started working as a duo with Finnish musician and guitarist Ile Kallio, releasing a number of albums.

== Discography ==
=== Albums ===
- 1991: Mustaa vettä
- 1995: Sade
- 1996: Lupaus
- 1997: Suuri salaisuus
- 1999: Noitavoimaa
- 2000: Kaikki oikeudet
- 2002: Kymmenen laulua
- 2004: Kuka saa kyyneleet
- 2005: Sodassa ja rakkaudessa
- 2008: Saman taivaan alla
- 2012: Köyhän naisen paratiisi

Preceded by Beat with Fri?	Finland in the Eurovision Song Contest; 1991	Succeeded by Pave Maijanen with Yamma, yamma
