= Finland in the Eurovision Song Contest 1991 =

- Eurovision Song Contest 1991
- Participating broadcaster: Yleisradio (Yle)
- Country: Finland
- Selection process: National final
- Selection date: 2 March 1991

Competing entry
- Song: "Hullu yö"
- Artist: Kaija
- Songwriters: Ile Kallio; Jukka Välimaa

Placement
- Final result: 20th, 6 points

Participation chronology

Finland was represented at the Eurovision Song Contest 1991 with the song "Hullu yö", composed by Ile Kallio, with lyrics by Jukka Välimaa, and performed by Kaija. The Finnish participating broadcaster, Yleisradio (Yle), selected its entry through a national final.

== Before Eurovision ==
=== National final ===
Ten entries were selected for the competition from 414 submissions received during a submission period as well as from composers and music publishers directly invited by Yleisradio (Yle). The national final was held on 2 March 1991 at the Typhon Hall in Turku, hosted by Kati Bergman. The winner chosen by an "expert" jury, which included Tina Pettersson, who had represented Finland in 1990 with the group Beat, and veteran Finnish Eurovision conductor Ossi Runne. Each juror distributed their points between 1–8 and 10 for each song, and 12 for the best song. Other participants included former Finnish representatives Riki Sorsa (1981) and Kirka (1984).

Jerry Lee Lewis was supposed to perform as an interval act since he was going to have a concert after the final. However, Yle's editor manager of entertainment, Erkki Pohjanheimo, arrived during the final to inform that Lewis had refused to perform. Instead, Lewis's band with the lead of Kenny Lovelace performed as an interval act.

Final – 2 March 1991
R/O	Artist	Song	Songwriter(s)	Points	Place
1	Riki Sorsa	"Viimeinen tie"	Hans Sjöblom	91	3
2	Anna Hanski	"Elämän haitari"	Ilpo Murtojärvi, Jukka Alihanka	36	9
3	Mervi Hiltunen and Jake Voutilainen	"Kauneimmat lauseet"	Jake Voutilainen, Hector	30	10
4	Arja Koriseva	"Enkelin silmin"	Matti Puurtinen, Turkka Mali	67	5
5	Samuli Edelmann	"Peggy"	Jarmo Nikku, Hector	95	2
6	Kaija Kärkinen	"Hullu yö"	Ile Kallio, Jukka Välimaa	109	1
7	Clifters	"I Love You"	Jiri Nikkinen, Jaana Rinne	51	7
8	Nina Moberg	"Kuinka voisinkaan"	Jokke Seppälä, Hector	64	6
9	Kirka	"Taivas ja maa"	Kisu Jernström, Kassu Halonen, Vexi Salmi	88	4
10	Arja Koriseva	"Molto presto"	Jukka Vuolle	49	8

Detailed Jury Votes
R/O	Song	Tarleena Sammalkorpi	Harri Merilahti	Aiju Ahlakorpi	Tommi Liuhala	Meiju Suvas	Tapio Sihvonen	Oona Tuomi	Asko Murtomäki	Jarmo Vanhapelto	Tina Pettersson	Ossi Runne	Total
1	"Viimeinen tie"	4	8	8	7	7	10	12	12	7	8	8	91
2	"Elämän haitari"	3	2	2	4	1	6	1	3	8	4	2	36
3	"Kauneimmat lauseet"	2	1	1	6	3	3	4	1	1	3	5	30
4	"Enkelin silmin"	4	3	4	7	6	5	5	10	10	6	7	67
5	"Peggy"	12	10	12	12	10	8	8	8	8	3	4	95
6	"Hullu yö"	10	12	10	8	8	12	10	7	12	10	10	109
7	"I Love You"	8	6	7	5	4	4	8	2	3	2	2	51
8	"Kuinka voisinkaan"	4	7	6	6	6	5	6	6	4	7	7	64
9	"Taivas ja maa"	6	5	5	10	12	8	7	5	6	12	12	88
10	"Molto presto"	4	1	3	4	4	6	5	4	3	5	10	49

== At Eurovision ==
On the night of the final Kärkinen performed 16th in the running order, following Israel and preceding Germany. Kärkinen was accompanied by Pirjo Aittomäki, Pemo Ojala and Anita Pajunen as backing vocalists. The performance's choreography was made by Mikko Rasila. At the close of voting "Hullu yö" had received 6 points, placing Finland 20th of the 22 entries. The Finnish jury awarded its 12 points to Italy.

The contest was broadcast on TV1 (with commentary by Erkki Pohjanheimo) and on radio stations Radiomafia (with commentary by Kai Ristola) and Swedish-language station Riksradion (with commentary by Johan Finne, Paul Olin and Wille Wilenius).

=== Voting ===
Points awarded to Finland
Score	Country
12 points	
10 points	
8 points	
7 points	
6 points	
5 points	
4 points	Ireland
3 points	
2 points	
1 point	Greece; Iceland

Points awarded by Finland
Score	Country
12 points	Italy
10 points	France
8 points	Sweden
7 points	Portugal
6 points	Israel
5 points	Switzerland
4 points	Spain
3 points	Belgium
2 points	Ireland
1 point	Greece
