= Bagatelle (band) =

Irish rock band

- Origin: Bray, County Wicklow, Ireland
- Genres: Rock; Irish Folk Music; Pop
- Years active: 1978 – present
- Labels: Polygram, Universal
- Past members: Liam Reilly (Keyboards); Ken Doyle (Bass); John O'Brien (Guitar); Wally McConville (Drums)

Bagatelle were an Irish rock band that first formed in August 1978. They are known for their popular pop hits such as "Second Violin", "Leeson Street Lady" and "Summer in Dublin", their best known song.

== Career ==
The band formed in Bray, County Wicklow, Ireland. Fellow Irish musician Bono commented on the impact that Bagatelle had on U2 in the early days of their career. Larry Mullen, of the same band, once said that he used to call them "Baga-Money", in reference to their fame, and that he wished that his band could be as successful as Bagatelle.

Bagatelle shared stages with artists such as Bob Marley, Don McLean and Jose Feliciano. Their albums were produced by Phil Coulter and the late Gus Dudgeon, who also produced for David Bowie and Elton John. Bagatelle appeared on the "Self Aid" concert in the mid-1980s with U2 and Van Morrison.

When the original Bagatelle re-formed the band in 1992, Polygram (now Universal), their record label, decided to release The Best of Bagatelle and Liam Reilly, and followed this with Bagatelle Gold. The band returned to touring in 2010 and released an album of cover versions entitled Under The Covers.

Although the band never attained international acclaim, they remain a hugely popular band in their home nation of Ireland. However, the hit "Second Violin" was such a success in Uruguay that it still remains popular today.

The group's lead singer and principal songwriter Liam Reilly died unexpectedly on 1 January 2021, aged 65.

== Discography ==
=== Albums ===
- Bagatelle (1980) ("Boat")
- Bagatelle (1981) ("Waterfall")
- Are We Keeping You Up? (1982)
- Gold: The Best of Bagatelle (1985)
- Cry Away the Night (1987)
- Under the Covers (2010) Recorded and released on Irish record label Celtic Collections
