= Norway in the Eurovision Song Contest 1991 =

- Eurovision Song Contest 1991
- Participating broadcaster: Norsk rikskringkasting (NRK)
- Country: Norway
- Selection process: Internal selection
- Announcement date: 16 March 1991

Competing entry
- Song: "Mrs. Thompson"
- Artist: Just 4 Fun
- Songwriters: Dag Kolsrud (music); P.G. Roness & Kaare Skevik Jr (lyrics)

Placement
- Final result: 17th, 14 points

Participation chronology

Norway was represented at the Eurovision Song Contest 1991 with the song "Mrs. Thompson", performed by the supergroup Just 4 Fun, which consisted of Hanne Krogh, Eirikur Hauksson, Marianne Anthonsen and Jan Groth. Krogh had previously represented Norway in 1971 and 1985 as part of Bobbysocks, while Hauksson had previously represented Iceland in 1986 as part of ICY.

For the first and only time in Norwegian Eurovision history, the song was selected internally after the participating broadcaster, Norsk rikskringkasting (NRK), cancelled the scheduled Melodi Grand Prix 1991 due to the 140 submitted entries all being considered "unacceptable". The cancellation caused considerable uproar and controversy among songwriters and fans, which resulted in an alternative, unofficial final being held on 23 February 1991.

== Before Eurovision ==
=== Cancelled Melodi Grand Prix 1991 ===
Norsk rikskringkasting (NRK) had originally scheduled Melodi Grand Prix 1991 to be held on 16 March 1991, but shockingly announced on 17 February that the contest had been cancelled due to sub-standard entries in the 140 submitted songs, which the jury considered had "low quality and lacked originality". Among the refused entries was "I evighet", which ended up finishing second in the 1996 contest in Oslo five years later, and entries from former Eurovision songwriters Arne Bendiksen and Philip Kruse - both of which objected to the cancellation and later took part in the alternative final on TV3 as jury members.

Head of musical entertainment at NRK, Totto Osvold, defended the jury, stating that the preceding years had shown a "steady decline in quality" and that intervention was inevitable. Despite multiple attempts at negotiations from several organisations and artists, NRK stood by the cancellation.

=== Alternative TV3 final (Ikväll: Robert Aschberg) ===
Competing broadcaster TV3 responded by hastily arranging their own national final as a special episode of the Norwegian-Swedish co-produced talk show Ikväll: Robert Aschberg, which featured eight of the refused singers and songwriters competing. It was broadcast on 23 February 1991, less than a week after NRKs announcement, and hosted by talk show host Robert Aschberg.

The competition, which lasted just over an hour, had two juries; one from Sweden, which included former Eurovision winner Richard Herrey of the Herreys (1984); and one from Norway which had several Eurovision alumni; Arne Bendiksen (1964 and 1971), Philip Kruse (1973 and 1974), and Elisabeth Andreasson (Sweden 1982 as part of Chips, and Norway 1985 as part of Bobbysocks.)

Alternative TV3 final - 23 February 1991
| R/O | Artist | Song | Songwriter(s) | | Points | Place |
| R/O | Artist | Song | Composer(s) | Lyricist(s) | Points | Place |
|---|---|---|---|---|---|---|
| 1 | Kristin Svendsen | "Stjerners tegn" | Lars Solstad | | 10 | 4 |
| 2 | Kitty Bumbulucz | "Kvinnen" | Kjell Karlsen | | 4 | 7 |
| 3 | Petter Wavold | "Når alle bruan é brent" | Petter Wavold | | 14 (Note: In the tie-breaking vote, "Ett liv" received 7 votes while "Når alle bruan é brent" received 2.) | 2 |
| 4 | Harald Tønsager | "Mer enn en drøm" | Harald Tønsager | | 2 | 8 |
| 5 | Mari Maurstad | "Du kan godt få lov" | Atle Bakken | Trond Brænne | 6 | 6 |
| 6 | Nick Borgen | "Den fineste jenta i klassen" | Nick Borgen | | 13 | 3 |
| 7 | Heidi Halvorsen | "Ett liv" | Harald Græsdahl | Tore Bakkland Holm | 14 | 1 |
| 8 | Anita Bogen | "Æ ska aldri gå i fra dæ" | Rolf Graf | | 9 | 5 |

Each of the eight songs competing were performed on stage, after which the juries gave the songs 1 through 8 points in alternating, ascending order (each jury gave their 1 point, then each their 2 points etc.). After both juries had voted there was a tie for first place, so each jury member were given a secret ballot to vote for one of the entries. The alternative final was won by "Ett liv" by Heidi Halvorsen, but since TV3 wasn't a member of EBU it was considered ineligible for entry, and also refused by NRK who had by then already begun work on an internal selection.

=== Internal selection and broadcast ===
NRK selected the group Just 4 Fun to represent Norway in the contest. The group had been formed a year earlier to take part in a three-week show of 1960s music but became an unexpected hit that extended their collaboration into a five-month tour and subsequent album. With the 140 submitted entries being refused, NRK gave the task of composing a new entry to Dag Kolsrud, P.G. Roness and Kaare Skevik Jr, who wrote and composed "Mrs. Thompson" for the occasion.

To compensate for the cancelled national final, NRK produced the variety special "Bare for gøy!" (literal: just for fun), a play on the name of the group, and hosted by Jahn Teigen on 16 March 1991. In addition to the reveal and first ever performance of the selected entry, the show featured performances of multiple previous Eurovision entries by their original singers and held an informal vote to choose the best MGP winner (in which the winner from 1985, "La det swinge", was selected).

== At Eurovision ==
On 4 May 1991, the Eurovision Song Contest was held at Stage 15 of Cinecittà studios in Rome hosted by Radiotelevisione italiana (RAI), and broadcast live throughout the continent. Just 4 Fun performed "Mrs. Thompson" 14th in the running order, following Denmark and preceding Israel. The entry was conducted by Pete Knutsen in his third Eurovision appearance conducting. At the close of voting it had received 14 points, placing 17th of the 22 entries.

=== Voting ===
Points awarded to Norway
| Score | Country |
|---|---|
| 12 points | |
| 10 points | |
| 8 points | |
| 7 points | |
| 6 points | Iceland |
| 5 points | |
| 4 points | Germany |
| 3 points | |
| 2 points | Denmark |
| 1 point | Luxembourg, Turkey |

Points awarded by Norway
| Score | Country |
|---|---|
| 12 points | France |
| 10 points | Italy |
| 8 points | Sweden |
| 7 points | Israel |
| 6 points | Malta |
| 5 points | Denmark |
| 4 points | Spain |
| 3 points | Switzerland |
| 2 points | Portugal |
| 1 point | Greece |
