= Belgium in the Eurovision Song Contest 1991 =

- Eurovision Song Contest 1991
- Participating broadcaster: Belgische Radio- en Televisieomroep (BRT)
- Country: Belgium
- Selection process: Artist: Internal selection Song: Euro-Clouseau
- Selection date: 9 March 1991

Competing entry
- Song: "Geef het op"
- Artist: Clouseau
- Songwriters: Kris Wauters; Koen Wauters; Bob Savenberg; Jan Leyers

Placement
- Final result: 16th, 23 points

Participation chronology

Belgium was represented at the Eurovision Song Contest 1991 with the song "Geef het op", written by Kris Wauters, Koen Wauters, Bob Savenberg, and Jan Leyers, and performed by the band Clouseau. The Belgian participating broadcaster, Flemish Belgische Radio- en Televisieomroep (BRT), selected its entry through a national final, after having previously selected the performer internally.

== Before Eurovision ==
=== Euro-Clouseau ===
Clouseau were chosen internally by Flemish broadcaster Belgische Radio- en Televisieomroep (BRT) to be that year's Belgian representatives. In June 1990, the BRT had signed an agreement with Clouseau to represent Belgium in the Eurovision Song Contest, but this agreement was not revealed to the public until 1 September 1990. On 9 March 1991, Euro-Clouseau was broadcast live at 20:10 CET on TV1. Euro-Clouseau was held in the Casino Cursaal in Ostend and was hosted by Jessica de Caluwe. The show featured archive footage of Clouseau's career, and Clouseau also performed several songs from their repertoire, three of which ("Geef het op", "Hilda", and "Ik kan zonder jou") were candidate songs for the Eurovision Song Contest. The band made their own choice from the three songs and announced "Geef het op" as the song they would perform in Rome.

Final – 9 March 1991
R/O	Song	Songwriters	Place
1	"Geef het op"	Koen Wauters, Kris Wauters, Bob Savenberg, Jan Leyers	1
2	"Hilda"	Koen Wauters, Kris Wauters, Bob Savenberg	–
3	"Ik kan zonder jou"	Koen Wauters, Kris Wauters, Bob Savenberg, Karel Theys	–

== At Eurovision ==
On the evening of the final Clouseau performed 18th in the running order, following Germany and preceding Spain. At the close of the voting "Geef het op" had received 23 points from seven countries (the highest being 5 from France and Italy), placing Belgium 16th out of 22 entries. The Belgian jury awarded its 12 points to Switzerland.

The contest was broadcast on TV1, TV2 (both with commentary by André Vermeulen), RTBF1 (with commentary by Claude Delacroix) and on radio station Radio 2.

=== Voting ===
Points awarded to Belgium
Score	Country
12 points	
10 points	
8 points	
7 points	
6 points	
5 points	France; Italy
4 points	
3 points	Austria; Finland; Spain
2 points	Sweden; United Kingdom
1 point	

Points awarded by Belgium
Score	Country
12 points	Switzerland
10 points	Sweden
8 points	Israel
7 points	France
6 points	Spain
5 points	Ireland
4 points	Malta
3 points	United Kingdom
2 points	Luxembourg
1 point	Greece
