= Sophia Vossou =

Greek singer (born 1961)

Sophia Vossou Σοφία Βόσσου
- Born: Sophia Skouphitsa; 5 December 1961 (age 64); Patras, Greece
- Origin: Athens, Greece
- Genres: Contemporary laiko, laiko
- Occupations: Singer, television presenter, producer
- Years active: 1979–present

Sophia Vossou (Greek: Σοφία Βόσσου; born 5 December 1961) is a Greek singer best known abroad for representing Greece at the Eurovision Song Contest 1991 where she was placed 13th with the song "I Anixi".

== Biography ==
Vossou was born in 1961 in Patras. She grew up in Athens where she studied music. In 1984 she took part in the Thessaloniki Song Contest where she won first prize. Following her success, Vossou began singing in nightclubs and soon released her first record Sophia, a pop and rock album. From the mid-1990s she started singing folk music with minor success. Her album, San Alitissa (Like A Tramp), was released in 2002, but was not a commercial success. She then cooperated with a group formed by Orthodox Christian monks, recording two pop/rock/gospel music with them.

=== Radio and television ===
Apart from her musical career, Vossou produced popular shows for the radio and television. She was the hostess of a very popular morning show on Mega Channel and continued her television career with another morning show on another Greek channel, while in 2006 she was one of the teachers in Dream Show, a talent show on Alpha Channel. She continued to work for Alpha by co-hosting a morning TV show with her former partner Andreas Mikroutsikos and his current wife. Apart from that she appeared on stage as a crazy maid, along with her comedian friend Elda Panopoulou. Vossou also had a supporting role on the sitcom Ola stin Taratsa for Alpha. In 2014, she participated in the show Your Face Sounds Familiar 2 broadcast by ANT1.

=== Eurovision Song Contest 1991 ===
In 1991, Vossou and Andreas Mikroutsikos were chosen to represent Greece at the Eurovision Song Contest in Rome with the song "I Anixi" (Spring). The song was successful in Greece, certifying platinum. "I Anixi" scored 36 points and ranked 13th among 22 at the Eurovision final in Rome.

== Discography ==
Personal Discography

| Year | Title | Certification |
|---|---|---|
| 1987 | Me hilies strofes | |
| 1988 | Erotas keravnovolos | |
| 1989 | Ektos Edras | |
| 1990 | Ta 28 moy xronia | |
| 1991 | "I Anixi" [single] | Platinum |
| 1993 | "Laika monopatia" [single] | Platinum |
| 1994 | Kali Akroasi | |
| 1994 | Ola edo tha meinoun | |
| 1996 | Me kourases [CD single] | Platinum |
| 1996 | Na me proseheis | |
| 2000 | Tha eimai edo | |
| 2002 | San alitissa | |
| 2002 | Stou fegariou tin agalia | |

Compilations

- Christougenna me ta asteria (Christmas with the Stars)
- SOS
- Konta sas (Close to you)
- Eurosongs
- Tihi Vouno (Crazy Luck)/OST
- Na maste pali edo Adrea (Here we are again Adrea)
- Join the club
- Villa Mercedes

| Preceded by Christos Callow & Wave with Horis skopo | Greece in the Eurovision Song Contest; 1991 | Succeeded by Cleopatra with Olou tou kosmou i elpida |
