= Michael Elo =

Danish musician

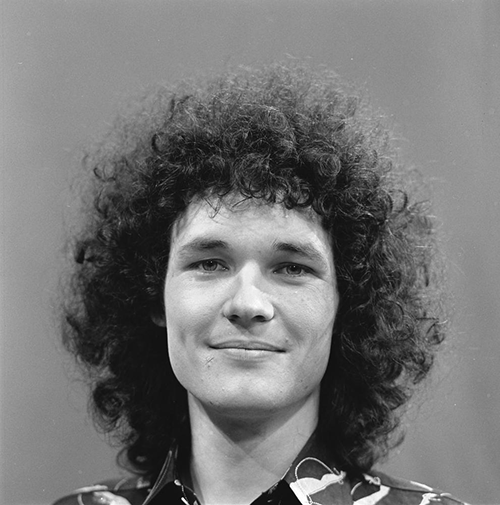
- Michael Elo in 1974, on AVRO's TopPop.

Background information
- Born: 16 March 1949 (age 76)

Michael Elo is a Danish musician and voice actor. He composed the Danish Eurovision Song Contest 1991 entry, "Lige der hvor hjertet slår", which was performed by Anders Frandsen.

Before that, Michael Elo had appeared several times in Eurovision as a backing singer for the Danish entries.

Since his 1991 entry, Michael Elo was seen as one of the judges on the Danish "look-alike" talent competition "Stjerneskud" in 1995, and he has also voiced several cartoons in the Danish language, as well as written translated lyrics for Disney songs and more.

Currently he is retired and lives outside Hillerød.
