= Kiev Connolly =

Irish songwriter, producer and musician

Kevin "Kiev" Connolly (born 5 April 1956) is an Irish songwriter, producer and musician. His group, Kiev Connolly and The Missing Passengers, represented Ireland at the Eurovision Song Contest 1989.

== Early life and education ==
Born in Ballymote, County Sligo, Connolly attended school in Cork. He moved to Germany in 1978, and worked as a studio musician and producer in West Berlin.

== Career ==
Connolly formed the pop group "The Missing Passengers" in 1985. The group secured a recording contract with Ariola/RCA in Germany and "toured Europe extensively". In 1985, the group performed Connolly's song "Did She Tell You" on both the Extratour program Radio Bremen/ARD, and the Musik Convoy program on WDR/ARD. Connolly returned to Ireland in 1987.

In 1989, Kiev Connolly and The Missing Passengers represented Ireland at the Eurovision Song Contest 1989 with Connolly's song The Real Me. The song reached number 17 in the Irish Singles Chart in May 1989. Yugoslavia won the Eurovision Song Contest that year.

In 2000, Connolly established Feature Music Studios. Connolly was involved in arranging and producing several live performances and albums of The Wolfe Tones. This included credits on the Wolfe Tones' 2001 album "You'll Never Beat the Irish". He also occasionally supported the Wolfe Tones, in performances, on keyboards and guitar.

Awards and achievements
Preceded by Jump the Gun with "Take Him Home"	Ireland in the Eurovision Song Contest (with The Missing Passengers); 1989	Succeeded by Liam Reilly with "Somewhere in Europe"
