= Iceland in the Eurovision Song Contest 1991 =

- Eurovision Song Contest 1991
- Participating broadcaster: Ríkisútvarpið (RÚV)
- Country: Iceland
- Selection process: Söngvakeppni Sjónvarpsins 1991
- Selection date: 9 February 1991

Competing entry
- Song: "Nína"
- Artist: Stefán and Eyfi
- Songwriter: Eyjólfur Kristjánsson

Placement
- Final result: 15th, 26 points

Participation chronology

Iceland was represented at the Eurovision Song Contest 1991 with the song "Nína", written by Eyjólfur Kristjánsson, and performed by Stefán Hilmarsson and Eyjólfur Kristjánsson. The Icelandic participating broadcaster, Ríkisútvarpið (RÚV), selected its entry through Söngvakeppni Sjónvarpsins 1991. The entry finished in 15th place out of 22 entries with 26 points.

== Before Eurovision ==
=== Söngvakeppni Sjónvarpsins 1991 ===
Ríkisútvarpið (RÚV) organised the sixth edition of Söngvakeppni Sjónvarpsins in order to select its entry for the Eurovision Song Contest 1991. RÚV held the contest on 9 February 1991 at its television studios in Reykjavík, hosted by Valgeir Guðjónsson. 10 songs competed, with the winner being decided through the votes of 8 regional juries and an expert jury. The winner was Stefán Hilmarsson and Eyjólfur Kristjánsson with the song "Draumur um Nínu", written by Kristjánsson.

Final – 9 February 1991
R/O	Artist	Song	Points	Place
1	Sigrún Eva Ármannsdottir and Jóhannes Eiðsson	"Lengi lifi lifið"	62	3
2	Ruth Reginalds and Ingvar Grétarsson	"Í fyrsta sinn"	47	4
3	Sigriður Guðnadóttir	"Mér þykir rétt að þú fáir að vita það"	30	9
4	Jóhanna Linnet	"Stjarna"	39	6
5	Helga Möller, Erna Þórarinsdóttir, Kristján Gíslason and Arnar Freyr Gunnarsson	"Í dag"	76	2
6	Ivar Halldórsson	"Í einlægni"	33	7
7	Kristján Gíslason	"Stefnumót"	19	10
8	Ruth Reginalds	"Í leit að þér"	45	5
9	Eyjólfur Kristjánsson and Stefán Hilmarsson	"Draumur um Ninu"	97	1
10	Sigriður Guðnadóttir and Áslaug Fjóla Magnúsdóttir	"Á fullri ferð"	32	8

== At Eurovision ==
=== Voting ===
Points awarded to Iceland
Score	Country
12 points	
10 points	Sweden
8 points	
7 points	Italy
6 points	
5 points	Germany
4 points	Switzerland
3 points	
2 points	
1 point	

Points awarded by Iceland
Score	Country
12 points	Sweden
10 points	Israel
8 points	Portugal
7 points	France
6 points	Norway
5 points	Switzerland
4 points	Luxembourg
3 points	Cyprus
2 points	Spain
1 point	Finland
