= 1950 in Nordic music =

The following is a list of notable events and compositions of the year 1950 in Nordic music.

== Events ==
- 9 March – The Iceland Symphony Orchestra is officially founded.
- unknown date – Finnish musical group Kipparikvartetti is brought together by Harry Bergström for the film Beautiful Vera, starring Kauko Käyhkö and Tuija Halonen.

== New works ==
- Karl-Birger Blomdahl – Symphony No. 3, "Facetter"
- Eivind Groven
  - Hjalarljod Overture, Op. 38
  - Piano Concerto, Op. 39a
- Vagn Holmboe – Symphony No. 7
- Allan Pettersson – Concerto for String Orchestra No. 1
- Hilding Rosenberg – Piano Concerto

== Popular music ==
- Kauko Käyhkö - "Rovaniemen markkinoilla"

== Film music ==
- Kai Gullmar & Sune Waldimir - Anderssonskans Kalle
- Sven Gyldmark - De Røde Heste
- Jerry Högstedt & Yngve Sköld - Kvartetten som sprängdes
- Erland von Koch & Lille Bror Söderlundh - Den vita katten'

== Births ==
- 28 January – Gro Anita Schønn, Norwegian singer and actor (died 2001)
- 5 April – Agnetha Fältskog, Swedish singer (ABBA)
- 12 April – Ivar Frounberg, Danish organist and composer
- 9 May – Kjell Solem, Norwegian musician (died 2010)
- 29 September – Pálmi Gunnarsson, Icelandic musician and songwriter
- 21 December – Lillebjørn Nilsen, Norwegian guitarist, singer and songwriter (died 2024)

== Deaths ==
- 17 February – Anna Bartels, Swedish operatic soprano (born 1869)
- 23 February – Cally Monrad, Norwegian singer and actress (born 1879)
- 16 March – Vilhelm Dybwad, Norwegian songwriter, writer of comedies and revues (born 1863)
- 2 April – Adolf Wiklund, Swedish composer (born 1879)
- 5 April – William Farre, Norwegian composer (born 1874)
- 6 April – Signe Lund, Norwegian composer (born 1868)
- 25 May – Niels Clemmensen, Danish pianist and composer (born 1900)
- 3 August – Georg Høeberg, Danish violinist, conductor and composer (born 1872)

== See also ==
- 1950 in Denmark
- 1950 in Iceland
- 1950 in Norwegian music
- 1950 in Sweden
