= Savvas Savva =

Cypriot composer

Savvas Savva (born 1958 in Nicosia, Cyprus), is a Cypriot composer, professor of musicology and pianist.

Savvas Savva started playing the piano at an early age with Olga Mavronicola, at the local branch of the Hellenic Conservatory. Later, he continued his studies at the Hellenic Conservatory of Athens and concentrated on orchestration under Anastasios Remoundos. Following a competition in Cyprus, he won a scholarship to study at the Tchaikovsky Conservatory in Moscow. There, he studied composition under Albert Simeonovich Leman and piano under Rimma Anatolevna Hanannina. He graduated from the conservatory with a degree in composition and musicology.

During his time in Moscow, Savvas took part in three competitions in free piano improvisation, winning first prize on all three occasions. On completion of his studies, he performed concerts and recitals in many countries, including Mexico, Romania, USA, Panama, Italy, Spain, Germany, Austria, Australia, England, Greece and Cyprus where he is still permanently based. In several of his concerts, he plays his own compositions.

Savvas has co-operated with many other composers, singers and song-makers from around the world. Many orchestras have included works of his into their program; amongst which the Moscow State Academy Orchestra, the Orchestra of the City of Athens, the Bucharest National Radio Orchestra, the Jaenae Filarmonia, the Duke University Symphony Orchestra, the Cyprus Symphony Orchestra, the Athens Trio, the Europaea Kamerata, Oltenia Philharmonic Orchestra Craiova, the Choir and Orchestra of Stockholm and others.

Savvas has written music for a large number of films, documentaries, and theatrical plays, whereas his classical repertoire is endless. His catalogue of compositions includes Symphonies (7), concertos for piano (3), violin, cello and flute, works for solo piano, chamber music, Ballets (2), Opera, songs and many other works including the Concerto for 10 pianos and orchestra (“Medieval Cyprus”) and the Dancing Suite for 10 pianos (“Dances and Songs of my Country”).

Savvas received 1st prize from the Cyprus Theatrical Organization for his composition “Little Tragedies” of Alexander Pushkin. In October 2005 Steinway & Sons included Savvas in its list of Steinway Artists, an honor for both himself and Cyprus as this involves the greatest artists worldwide. Savvas is the new president of Cyprus composers center.
