= Liam Reilly =

Irish singer (1955–2021)

- Born: Liam O'Reilly; 29 January 1955; Dundalk, Ireland
- Died: 1 January 2021 (aged 65)
- Occupations: Singer; songwriter; musician
- Instruments: Vocals; keyboards
- Years active: 1978–2020
- Formerly of: Bagatelle

Liam Reilly (29 January 1955 – 1 January 2021) was an Irish singer-songwriter and a member of the group Bagatelle, formed in 1978 by drummer Walter (Wally) McConville along with bass player Ken Doyle and guitarist John O’Brien.

== Career ==
In 1980, while recording the band's debut album, Reilly had received an offer from producer Gus Dudgeon, known for his work with Elton John and David Bowie, to begin a solo career in return for leaving the other band members to their own devices. However, Reilly refused and insisted on sticking by the other members as they had done the same for him until that point. After leaving the group in the mid-1980s, he moved to Savannah, Georgia and began a solo career. While in Savannah, he recorded an album entitled Savannah Souvenir which featured much of Reilly's keyboards and vocals and was produced by Phil Hadaway. In 1988 he was a finalist in the Irish heats of the Eurovision Song Contest with the song "Lifeline", finishing in second place. Reilly came back to win the Irish national final in 1990 with "Somewhere in Europe". He subsequently performed it at the Eurovision Song Contest that year staged in Zagreb and was placed joint second out of the 22 entries. As a composer, Reilly returned to Eurovision in Rome in 1991 where his song "Could It Be That I'm in Love", performed by Kim Jackson, was placed equal tenth.

In 1990, he co-produced an album with American producer Phil Hadaway, Throwing Caution to the Wind (Polydor 847535-4), recorded at Westland Studios Dublin and Reeltime Recording, Savannah, Georgia, USA. All songs were written by Liam Reilly except 'Georgia on My Mind' and 'Moonriver'.

== Death ==
Per a family statement, Reilly died "suddenly but peacefully" at his home in Dundalk, Ireland, on 1 January 2021, aged 65. He is buried in St. Patrick’s Cemetery in Dundalk.

Awards and achievements
Preceded by Kiev Connolly and The Missing Passengers with "The Real Me"	Ireland in the Eurovision Song Contest; 1990	Succeeded by Kim Jackson with "Could It Be That I'm in Love"
