= Denmark in the Eurovision Song Contest 1991 =

Denmark in the Eurovision

- Eurovision Song Contest 1991
- Participating broadcaster: Danmarks Radio (DR)
- Country: Denmark
- Selection process: Dansk Melodi Grand Prix 1991
- Selection date: 16 March 1991

Competing entry
- Song: "Lige der hvor hjertet slår"
- Artist: Anders Frandsen
- Songwriter: Michael Elo

Placement
- Final result: 19th, 8 points

Participation chronology

Denmark was represented at the Eurovision Song Contest 1991 with the song "Lige der hvor hjertet slår", written by Michael Elo, and performed by Anders Frandsen. The Danish participating broadcaster, Danmarks Radio (DR), organised the Dansk Melodi Grand Prix 1991 in order to select its entry for the contest.

== Before Eurovision ==
=== Dansk Melodi Grand Prix 1991 ===
Danmarks Radio (DR) held the Dansk Melodi Grand Prix 1991 on 16 March at the Music Hall in Aarhus, hosted by Camilla Miehe-Renard and Mek Pek. Ten songs took part with the winner being decided by two rounds of televoting. In the first round the bottom five songs were eliminated, then the remaining five were voted on again to give the winner. One of the other participants was Birthe Kjær, who had finished third at Eurovision in 1989.

First Round – 16 March 1991
R/O	Artist	Song	Songwriter(s)	Result
1	Birthe Kjær	"Din musik – min musik"	Kim Sjøgren, Keld Heick	Advanced
2	Lise Dandanell and Lars Berthelsen	"Casanova"	Frans Bak	—N/a
3	Lars Nielsen	"King Kong Baby"	Christian Winding, Bent Hesselmann	—N/a
4	Anders Frandsen	"Lige der hvor hjertet slår"	Michael Elo	Advanced
5	Käte and Per	"Var der ellers noget du ville"	Per Damgaard, Viggo Happel	—N/a
6	Helle Børgensen	"Afrodite af i dag"	Wolfgang Käfer, Daniel Käfer	—N/a
7	Pernille Petersen	"Casino"	Iver Lind Greiner, Keld Heick	Advanced
8	The Boys	"Vinder hvisker"	Klaus Phanareth, Kim Otto Jacobsen	—N/a
9	Annette Heick and Egil Eldøen	"Du er musikken i mit liv"	George Keller, Hilda Heick, Keld Heick	Advanced
10	Ulla Bjerre & Ole Bredahl	"Med exprestog til Kina"	Ole Bredahl	Advanced

Second Round – 16 March 1991
R/O	Artist	Song	Televote	Place
1	Birthe Kjær	"Din musik – min musik"	2,411	3
2	Anders Frandsen	"Lige der hvor hjertet slår"	3,819	1
3	Pernille Petersen	"Casino"	1,398	5
4	Annette Heick and Egil Eldøen	"Du er musikken i mit liv"	1,402	4
5	Ulla Bjerre and Ole Bredahl	"Med exprestog til Kina"	3,099	2

== At Eurovision ==
On the night of the final Frandsen performed 13th in the running order, following Portugal and preceding Norway. At the close of voting "Lige der hvor hjertet slår" had received 8 points, placing Denmark 19th of the 22 entries. It was the country's worst Eurovision placement up to that point, and it would remain so until 1993. The Danish jury awarded its 12 points to contest winners Sweden.

The contest was broadcast on DR TV (with commentary by Camilla Miehe-Renard) and on radio station DR P3 (with commentary by Jesper Bæhrenz and Andrew Jensen).

=== Voting ===
Points awarded to Denmark
Score	Country
12 points	
10 points	
8 points	
7 points	
6 points	
5 points	Norway
4 points	
3 points	Sweden
2 points	
1 point	

Points awarded by Denmark
Score	Country
12 points	Sweden
10 points	Israel
8 points	Turkey
7 points	Ireland
6 points	Germany
5 points	Switzerland
4 points	Luxembourg
3 points	United Kingdom
2 points	Norway
1 point	Portugal
