= Sweden in the Eurovision Song Contest 1991 =

- Eurovision Song Contest 1991
- Participating broadcaster: Sveriges Television (SVT)
- Country: Sweden
- Selection process: Melodifestivalen 1991
- Selection date: 31 March 1991

Competing entry
- Song: "Fångad av en stormvind"
- Artist: Carola
- Songwriter: Stephan Berg

Placement
- Final result: 1st, 146 points

Participation chronology

Sweden was represented at the Eurovision Song Contest 1991 with the song "Fångad av en stormvind", written by Stephan Berg, and performed by Carola. The Swedish participating broadcaster, Sveriges Television (SVT), selected its entry through Melodifestivalen 1991. Carola had already represented Sweden at the 1983 contest. The entry eventually won the Eurovision Song Contest after having to apply the tiebreaker rule because it ended with the same number of points as the entry from France. This was the third ever victory for Sweden in the contest.

== Before Eurovision ==
=== Melodifestivalen 1991 ===
Melodifestivalen 1991 was the selection for the 31st song to represent Sweden at the Eurovision Song Contest. It was the 30th time that this system of picking a song had been used. 1,323 songs were submitted to Sveriges Television (SVT) for the competition. The final was held in the Malmö Stadsteater in Malmö on 31 March 1991, presented by Harald Treutiger and was broadcast on TV2 and Sveriges Radio's P3 network. Carola Häggkvist went on to win that year's Eurovision Song Contest in Rome, Sweden's third Eurovision win. The show was watched by 5,880,000 people.

R/O	Artist	Song	Songwriter(s)	Place
1	Laila Dahl	"Annie"	Arne Höglund	Qualified
2	Pernilla Wahlgren	"Tvillingsjäl"	Lena Philipsson	—N/a
3	Diana Nuñez	"Kärlekens dans"	Christina Beijbom, Lars Beijbom	—N/a
4	John Ekedahl	"Stanna du i dina drömmar"	John Ekedahl	—N/a
5	Jessica Wimert	"Änglar"	Per Andréasson, Anders Dannvik	—N/a
6	Towe Jaarnek	"Ett liv med dig"	Ingela 'Pling' Forsman, Bobby Ljunggren, Håkan Almqvist	Qualified
7	Jim Jidhed	"Kommer du ihåg mig?"	Peter Karlsson, Joakim Hagleitner	Qualified
8	Carola	"Fångad av en stormvind"	Stephan Berg	Qualified
9	Tove Naess	"Låt mig se ett under"	Stephan Berg	Qualified
10	Sharon Dyall	"Ge mig ett svar"	Pål Svenre, Linus Bergström	—N/a

Artist	Song	Songwriter(s)	Points	Place
Laila Dahl	"Annie"	Arne Höglund	33	4
Towe Jaarnek	"Ett liv med dig"	Ingela 'Pling' Forsman, Bobby Ljunggren, Håkan Almqvist	46	2
Jim Jidhed	"Kommer du ihåg mig?"	Peter Karlsson, Joakim Hagleitner	45	3
Carola	"Fångad av en stormvind"	Stephan Berg	78	1
Tove Naess	"Låt mig se ett under"	Stephan Berg	29	5

Voting
Song	Luleå	Örebro	Umeå	Norrköping	Falun	Karlstad	Sundsvall	Växjö	Stockholm	Gothenburg	Malmö	Total
"Annie"	4	6	6	2	1	4	1	2	1	2	4	33
"Ett liv med dig"	2	1	2	8	6	6	2	4	8	6	1	46
"Kommer du ihåg mig?"	6	2	8	6	2	2	6	1	2	4	6	45
"Fångad av en stormvind"	8	8	4	4	8	8	8	8	6	8	8	78
"Låt mig se ett under"	1	4	1	1	4	1	4	6	4	1	2	29

== At Eurovision ==
One of the favourites to win, Carola sang eighth on the night of the contest, following Luxembourg and preceding France. At the close of the voting, she had received 146 points, placing joint first place with France's "C'est le dernier qui a parlé qui a raison" performed by Amina. After the four-way tie at the 1969 contest, a tie-break system had been implemented, where a count-back on the number of top points awarded was used. Both countries received four 1st-place votes, but Sweden gained five 2nd-place votes versus two for France, making Sweden the winner. Carola earned the third ever victory for Sweden.

=== Voting ===
Points awarded to Sweden
Score	Country
12 points	Denmark; Germany; Iceland; United Kingdom
10 points	Austria; Belgium; Israel; Portugal; Switzerland
8 points	Finland; Norway
7 points	Luxembourg
6 points	Cyprus; Turkey; Yugoslavia
5 points	
4 points	Spain
3 points	Ireland
2 points	
1 point	

Points awarded by Sweden
Score	Country
12 points	Malta
10 points	Iceland
8 points	Switzerland
7 points	Portugal
6 points	Israel
5 points	France
4 points	Spain
3 points	Denmark
2 points	Belgium
1 point	Luxembourg
