= Reyhan Karaca =

Turkish singer (born 1970)

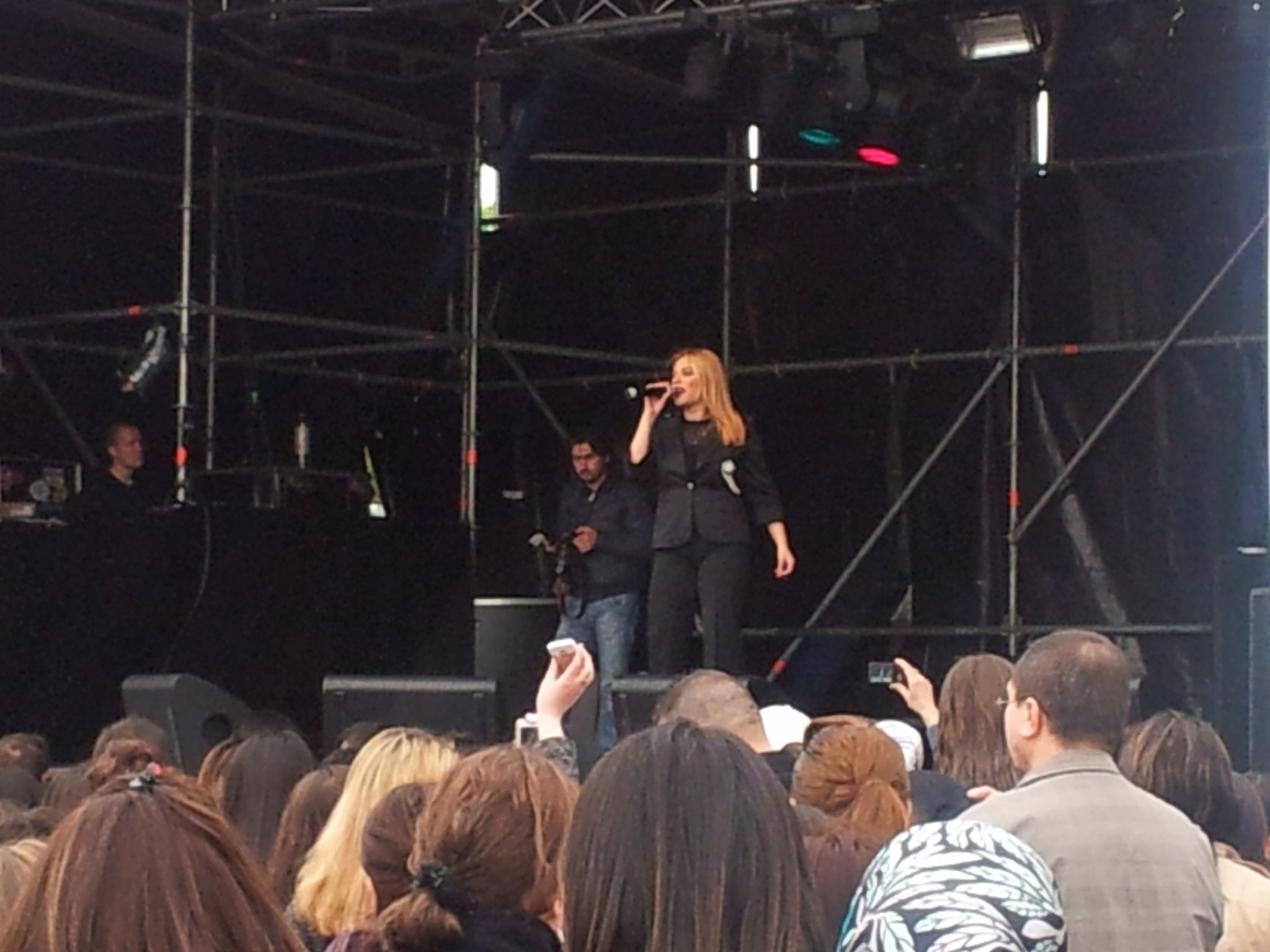
- Karaca performing in Brussels, May 2012

Background information
- Born: Reyhan Soykarcı; 8 November 1970 (age 55); Istanbul, Turkey
- Genres: Pop
- Occupation: Singer
- Years active: 1991–present
- Labels: Tempa Foneks; Yaşar Kekeva Plakçılık; Aral Müzik; Ozan Video; Seyhan Müzik; DMC; Ossi Müzik; GNL Entertainment

Reyhan Soykarcı, better known as Reyhan Karaca (born 8 November 1970) is a Turkish singer.

== Early life and education ==
Karaca was born as the daughter of actor Ahmet Karaca in Harbiye, Şişli. She grew up in a family that was closely associated with music. At the age of 8, she won the Istanbul Children's Choir award. After attending Harbiye Primary School, she passed the exams of Istanbul Technical University Turkish Music State Conservatory, and continued her education at the Instrument-Training Department. Her admiration of George Michael, led her pursue a musical career in 1984.

She completed her secondary and college education at the Istanbul Technical University. She received her master's degree at the Istanbul Technical University Music Department. After her graduation, she worked as an instructor in Istanbul Technical University State Conservatory for three years. She also taught music at a private high school for a year and at a private college for a year.

== Career ==
She started her professional music life in 1987. She worked as a backing vocalist and instrumentalist for a number of musicians. In 1988, Karaca and Melih Kibar sought to represent Turkey at the Eurovision Song Contest but were eliminated in the qualifiers. In 1990, she started working for Zerrin Özer as a backing vocalist for seven years. In 1991, together with İzel and Can Uğurluer, she represented Turkey at the Eurovision Song Contest 1991. They were placed 12th with 44 points.

Following her participation in the contest, she received a number of offers to make her first studio album. In 1993, Karaca released her first studio album Başlangıç under the direction of Garo Mafyan. She did not promote the album as it was not made in accordance with the musical mode of that period.

Her main breakthrough came on 20 May 1997, when her second studio album Sevdik Sevdalandık was released.

In 2012, Karaca concentrated more on her acting career. She joined the Abdullah Sahin Spot Theater team and had a role in the play Öldüm Öldüm Dirildim alongside Abdullah Şahin, Merve Sevi, İpek Tanrıya, Ali Yaylı, and İrem Mercan. In the same year, Ossi Müzik released her maxi single Yaz on 5 June 2012. Hakan Eren served as the album's producer, and Alper Atakan was its music director. The album features Emel Müftüoğlu's 1994 "Sevmek En Büyük Devlet", written by Şehrazat, as well as the song "Yüz Yıldır Yalnızım", originally composed by Zeki Güner.

On 13 January 2015, the GNL Entertainment and DMC distributed her single "Sobe", which was produced by Isaac Angel, written by Murat Güneş, and composed by American musician James Hayden Gallagher. The song was recorded at a studio in New York. Its music video was shot in Philadelphia and New York City. On 13 May 2015, DMC released her new single "Şans", which was written by Ayla Çelik and arranged by James Hayden Gallagher. The song was again recorded in New York. Isaac Angel served as the art and image director, and Gökhan Özdemir directed its music video, which was shot in New York, New Jersey, and Philadelphia.

On 5 January 2016, TRT Kent Radio Istanbul started airing Karaca's radio program Reyhan Karaca ile Başarı Öyküleri. Each week, Karaca shed light on the stories of famous guests and artists from different sectors. On 20 April 2016, DMC released her new single "Kelebek", which was written by Berksan and composed by Turaç Berkay Özer. Gökhan Özdemir directed its music video, which was shot in the US and Turkey.

On 7 May 2018, Karaca released her new single "Roma", which was written by Selahattin Erhan, and composed by Okan Akı. Yaşar Kekeva Plakçılık produced the single. Dancers and model Ali Yücel accompanied Karaca in the music video directed by Gökhan Özdemir in the Beykoz shoe factory.

== Discography ==
=== Albums ===
- Başlangıç (1993)
- Sevdik Sevdalandık (1997)
- Yaman Olacak (2000)
- Mesela (2003)
- İmza (2007)

=== Singles ===
- "Sevmeyi Bilmeyen Adam" (2009)
- "Yeniden" (2010)
- "Yaz" (2012)
- "Hep Mi Dertliyiz" (from Extra Orchestra's album) (2014)
- "Sobe" (2015)
- "Şans" (2015)
- "Kelebek" (2016)
- "Roma" (2018)
- "Umarsız" (2018)
- "Laga Luga" (2019)
- "Aşk Tutulması" (2020)
- "Bi Zahmet" (2020)
- "Tam 12'Den" (2021)
