= Le Dernier qui a parlé... =

1991 song by Amina Annabi

Single by Amina

from the album Yalil
- Language: French
- Released: 1991
- Recorded: 1991, France
- Genre: World music
- Length: 3:10
- Label: Philips
- Composer: Wasis Diop
- Lyricist: Amina Annabi
- Producer: Martin Meissonnier

Eurovision Song Contest 1991 entry
- Country: France
- Artist: Amina
- Language: French
- Composer: Wasis Diop
- Lyricist: Amina Annabi
- Conductor: Jérôme Pillement

Finals performance
- Final result: 2nd
- Final points: 146

Entry chronology
- ◄ "White and Black Blues" (1990)
- "Monté la riviè" (1992) ►

Official performance video
- "C'est le dernier qui a parlé qui a raison" on YouTube

"Le Dernier qui a parlé..." (French pronunciation: [lə dɛʁnje ki a paʁle]; "The last to have spoken...") is a song recorded by singer-songwriter Amina, with music composed by Wasis Diop and lyrics by Amina herself. It represented France in the Eurovision Song Contest 1991, performed as "C'est le dernier qui a parlé qui a raison" ("It's the last to have spoken who is right").

== Background ==
=== Conception ===
"Le Dernier qui a parlé..." lyrics were written by Amina to music composed by Wasis Diop. Lyrically, she sings about the truth of the saying referenced in the title. She also extends it to "it's the loudest one to have spoken who is right".

=== Eurovision ===
Antenne 2 internally selected the song as its entrant for the 36th edition of the Eurovision Song Contest.

On 4 May 1991, the Eurovision Song Contest was held at Cinecittà studios in Rome hosted by Radiotelevisione italiana (RAI), and broadcast live throughout the continent. In her introductory video postcard, Amina sang Rita Pavone's "La partita di pallone". She performed "C'est le dernier qui a parlé qui a raison" ninth on the night, following Sweden's "Fångad av en stormvind" by Carola and preceding Turkey's "İki Dakika" by İzel Çeliköz, Reyhan Karaca & Can Uğurluer. Jérôme Pillement conducted the event's orchestra in the performance of the Swedish entry.

At the close of voting, the song had received 146 points, the same number of points as the Swedish entry. Both songs had received also the same number of twelve-point sets. However, Sweden was given the victory as it had received more ten-point votes than France, as that was the tie breaker procedure at the time. That rule had been introduced in order to avoid a split victory, as it had happened at the 1969 contest. This was the first and the last time that procedure was used. France placed second in a field of twenty-two that year. It was the last time France finished in the top 3 until thirty years later in the 2021 contest.

The song was succeeded as French representative at the 1992 contest by "Monté la riviè" by Kali.

== Track listings ==
CD single

1. "Le Dernier qui a parlé..." — 3:10
2. "Neila" — 4:25

CD maxi

1. "Le Dernier qui a parlé..." (remix) — 4:36
2. "Neila" — 4:25
3. "Le Dernier qui a parlé..." — 3:16

7" single

1. "Le Dernier qui a parlé..." — 3:10
2. "Neila" — 4:25

== Chart history ==
=== Weekly charts ===
Chart (1991)	Peak position
Austria (Ö3 Austria Top 40)	22
Belgium (Ultratop 50 Flanders)	23
France (SNEP)	30
Netherlands (Single Top 100)	41
Sweden (Sverigetopplistan)	19
