= Go (Scott Fitzgerald song) =

Song by Scott Fitzgerald

Single by Scott Fitzgerald
- Released: 1988
- Songwriter: Julie Forsyth

Eurovision Song Contest 1988 entry
- Country: United Kingdom
- Artist: Scott Fitzgerald
- Language: English
- Composer: Julie Forsyth
- Lyricist: Julie Forsyth
- Conductor: Ronnie Hazlehurst

Finals performance
- Final result: 2nd
- Final points: 136

Entry chronology
- ◄ "Only the Light" (1987)
- "Why Do I Always Get it Wrong?" (1989) ►

"Go", is a song written by Julie Forsyth (a member of the pop group Guys 'n' Dolls and the daughter of English entertainer Bruce Forsyth), and performed by Scott Fitzgerald. It represented the United Kingdom in the Eurovision Song Contest 1988. Bruce Forsyth and his wife were in the audience at the contest, supporting their daughter.

Fitzgerald won the right to perform at the contest, held in Dublin, by winning the UK national final, A Song for Europe, where he was the eighth singer to perform. Fitzgerald was also the first singer to be chosen to represent the United Kingdom via a national telephone vote. In Dublin, the song was performed fourth on the night, after Finland's Boulevard with "Nauravat silmät muistetaan", and before Turkey's Mazhar-Fuat-Özkan with "Sufi."

At the end of judging that evening, "Go" took the second-place slot with 136 points. Turkey, Belgium and Italy awarded their 12-point designations to the UK that evening. In one of the closest voting rounds up to that time, the UK lost the competition by one point to Switzerland's representative, Canadian singer Céline Dion, with her song "Ne partez pas sans moi". According to author and contest historian John Kennedy O'Connor, this was the closest contest yet, with the winning margin being just 0.73%. The strong showing in the 1988 contest was an indicator of things to come for the United Kingdom, as it would become the first of eleven straight top ten placings in the contest, and the first of four second-place finishes in the next six years.

In a departure from the past two years, an easy listening ballad was on offer this year, telling the story of two former lovers meeting by chance. Fitzgerald, in the role of the lovesick man, relates the sad story; his former lover had left him years before for another man, and now that she has returned, so has all the sorrow he felt.

After Eurovision, the song placed at No. 52 on the UK Singles Chart. The song was later covered by Russian singer Philipp Kirkorov.

== Charts ==
Chart (1988)	Peak position
UK Singles Official Charts Company	52

Preceded by "Only the Light" by Rikki	United Kingdom in the Eurovision Song Contest; 1988	Succeeded by "Why Do I Always Get it Wrong?" by Live Report
