= Yugoslavia in the Eurovision Song Contest 1988 =

- Eurovision Song Contest 1988
- Participating broadcaster: Jugoslavenska radiotelevizija (JRT)
- Country: Yugoslavia
- Selection process: Jugovizija 1988
- Selection date: 12 March 1988

Competing entry
- Song: "Mangup"
- Artist: Srebrna krila
- Songwriters: Rajko Dujmić; Stevo Cvikić

Placement
- Final result: 6th, 87 points

Participation chronology

Yugoslavia was represented at the Eurovision Song Contest 1988 with the song "Mangup" (Мангуп), written by Rajko Dujmić and Stevo Cvikić, and performed by Srebrna krila. The Yugoslav participating broadcaster, Jugoslavenska radiotelevizija (JRT), selected its entry through Jugovizija 1988.

== Before Eurovision ==
=== Jugovizija 1988 ===
The Yugoslav national final was held on 12 March 1988 at the Cankarjev dom in Ljubljana, hosted by Miša Molk and Bogdan Barovič. There were originally meant to be 16 songs competing, but "Noć u suzama" performed by Jasna Gospić had to be withdrawn as the singer was ill in hospital. The winning song was chosen by the votes of 8 regional juries.

The new voting system introduced in 1987 allowed the juries from each TV studio to be able to vote for their own entries. Most of them used this opportunity, as well as in the following years. Every jury member (3 from every TV studio - 24 in total) could vote only for 5 songs.

Final – 12 March 1988
R/O	Broadcaster	Artist	Song	Points	Place
1	RTV Ljubljana	Moni, Simona and Urša	"Lahko je reči ljubim te"	7	13
2	RTV Skopje	Maja Odžaklievska and Gu-Gu	"Te ljubam ludo"	42	5
3	RTV Sarajevo	Zerina Cokoja and Narcis Vučina	"Voljeću te"	21	8
4	RTV Pristina	Edmond Islami	"Kaltrina"	10	11
5	RTV Sarajevo	Arnela Konaković	"Slatki snovi"	12	10
6	RTV Titograd	Mito Zoranić	"To mora da je ljubav"	4	14
7	RTV Ljubljana	Meta Močnik	"Še in še"	10	11
8	RTV Novi Sad	Sunčeve pege	"Zaboravi sve"	39	6
9	RTV Zagreb	Oliver Dragojević	"Dženi"	51	2
10	RTV Belgrade	Alen Slavica	"Suzan"	4	14
11	RTV Novi Sad	Meri Cetinić	"Ne sudite mi noćas"	15	9
12	RTV Belgrade	Bebi Dol	"Zatvori mama prozore"	49	3
13	RTV Zagreb	Srebrna krila	"Mangup"	87	1
14	RTV Ljubljana	Moulin Rouge	"Johnny je moj"	43	4
15	RTV Zagreb	Grupa 777	"Tiha noć"	38	7

Entries submitted by broadcaster whose jury members were voting

Detailed Regional Jury Votes
R/O	Song	RTV Sarajevo			RTV Ljubljana			RTV Skopje			RTV Pristina			RTV Titograd			RTV Novi Sad			RTV Zagreb			RTV Belgrade			Total
1	"Lahko je reči ljubim te"				1		2					2											2			7
2	"Te ljubam ludo"				2	2	3	5	5	3				7	5	7	1					1		1		42
3	"Voljeću te"		1																	2		3	1	7	7	21
4	"Kaltrina"										3		1					3			3					10
5	"Slatki snovi"	2		2														1	7							12
6	"To mora da je ljubav"													1	1	2										4
7	"Še in še"					1	1											7	1							10
8	"Zaboravi sve"	1		5				1			2		3	3	2		5	5	3	1		2	3	2	1	39
9	"Dženi"	7	2	3				7	2	1					3	5	7		2	7	2				3	51
10	"Suzan"		3	1																						4
11	"Ne sudite mi noćas"				3	3		2		7																15
12	"Zatvori mama prozore"	5	5						1	5		1	5	2		1	3		5		1		7	3	5	49
13	"Mangup"	3			7	7	7	3	3	2	5	7	7	5	7	3		2		5	7	7				87
14	"Johnny je moj"				5	5	5				7	5	2				2						5	5	2	43
15	"Tiha noć"		7	7					7		1	3								3	5	5				38

== At Eurovision ==
The contest was broadcast on television on: TV Beograd 1, TV Novi Sad, TV Prishtina, TV Sarajevo 1, and TV Zagreb 1, all with commentary provided by Oliver Mlakar; and on TV Ljubljana 1.

On the night of the contest Yugoslavia performed last 21st, following Portugal. At the close of voting it had received 87 points, placing 6th in a field of 21.

=== Voting ===
Points awarded to Yugoslavia
Score	Country
12 points	Denmark; Iceland; Israel
10 points	
8 points	United Kingdom
7 points	Luxembourg; Turkey
6 points	Italy; Sweden
5 points	
4 points	Austria; Greece
3 points	France; Ireland
2 points	Switzerland
1 point	Finland

Points awarded by Yugoslavia
Score	Country
12 points	France
10 points	Norway
8 points	Germany
7 points	Netherlands
6 points	Switzerland
5 points	Italy
4 points	Spain
3 points	Luxembourg
2 points	Ireland
1 point	Israel
