= Israel in the Eurovision Song Contest 1988 =

- Eurovision Song Contest 1988
- Participating broadcaster: Israel Broadcasting Authority (IBA)
- Country: Israel
- Selection process: Artist: Internal selection Song: Kdam Eurovision 1988
- Selection date: 27 March 1988

Competing entry
- Song: "Ben Adam"
- Artist: Yardena Arazi
- Songwriters: Boris Dimitshtein; Ehud Manor

Placement
- Final result: 7th, 85 points

Participation chronology

Israel was represented at the Eurovision Song Contest 1988 with the song "Ben Adam", composed by Boris Dimitshtein, with lyrics by Ehud Manor, and performed by Yardena Arazi. The Israeli participating broadcaster, the Israel Broadcasting Authority (IBA), selected its entry for the contest through Kdam Eurovision 1988, after having previously selected the performer internally.

== Before Eurovision ==
=== Kdam Eurovision 1988 ===
For the 1988 edition of Israel's annual national selection, Yardena Arazi was internally selected by the Israel Broadcasting Authority (IBA) to be the national representative. Previously, she had represented Israel in 1976 as a member of Chocolate, Menta, Mastik, who finished sixth with the song "Emor Shalom". She also co-hosted the 1979 contest alongside Daniel Pe'er in Jerusalem. She competed in the national finals in 1982, 1983, and 1985, finishing as runner-up in the first two and third in the latter, and co-hosted the 1987 national final alongside Yoram Arbel. For 1988, seeing as she had a high stature in Israeli popular music and still wished to compete, the IBA decided it was only fair to let her automatically take the slot as the country's representative, and use the national final to select her song.

IBA held Kdam Eurovision 1988 on 27 March 1988 at its studios in Jerusalem, hosted by Rivka Michaeli. Arazi performed four songs, from which four national juries selected the one that would compete in Ireland. "Ben Adam", composed by Boris Dimitshtein and written by Ehud Manor (who also wrote the lyrics to several prior and future Israeli entries, including 1978 Eurovision winner "A-Ba-Ni-Bi"), was eventually chosen as the Israeli entry.

R/O	Song	Points	Place
1	"Kmo bahatchala"	29	4
2	"Ben Adam"	48	1
3	"Karov layam"	31	3
4	"Hi rokedet"	40	2

== At Eurovision ==
As the story goes, when Arazi was initially approached to compete in Ireland, she consulted with her psychic, as she was very superstitious and wanted to be sure it was the right call. Her psychic informed her that the song drawn ninth would win the 1988 contest - which, as it happened, was the slot Israel was drawn to perform in (following the Netherlands and preceding Switzerland). She agreed to do it, only to be moved up to perform eighth following the withdrawal of Cyprus (who had been drawn to perform second). Switzerland, who were now performing ninth, did in fact win. However, Arazi was reportedly still in high spirits during her week in Dublin.

Israel placed seventh among the twenty-one competing entries. Her backing performers included two members of Milk and Honey, who won the 1979 edition with "Hallelujah". The Israeli jury awarded their twelve points to Yugoslavia's "Mangup" by Srebrna krila.

=== Voting ===
Points awarded to Israel
Score	Country
12 points	
10 points	Belgium; France; Portugal; Switzerland
8 points	
7 points	
6 points	Finland; Iceland; Spain
5 points	Germany; Luxembourg
4 points	United Kingdom
3 points	Greece; Italy; Netherlands
2 points	Austria
1 point	Ireland; Yugoslavia

Points awarded by Israel
Score	Country
12 points	Yugoslavia
10 points	United Kingdom
8 points	Turkey
7 points	Netherlands
6 points	Denmark
5 points	Germany
4 points	Switzerland
3 points	Finland
2 points	Spain
1 point	Norway
