= Norway in the Eurovision Song Contest 1988 =

- Eurovision Song Contest 1988
- Participating broadcaster: Norsk rikskringkasting (NRK)
- Country: Norway
- Selection process: Melodi Grand Prix 1988
- Selection date: 26 March 1988

Competing entry
- Song: "For vår jord"
- Artist: Karoline Krüger
- Songwriters: Anita Skorgan; Erik Hillestad

Placement
- Final result: 5th, 88 points

Participation chronology

Norway was represented at the Eurovision Song Contest 1988 with the song "For vår jord", composed by Anita Skorgan, with lyrics by Erik Hillestad, and performed by Karoline Krüger. The Norwegian participating broadcaster, Norsk rikskringkasting (NRK), selected its entry through the Melodi Grand Prix 1988.

== Before Eurovision ==
=== Melodi Grand Prix 1988 ===
Norsk rikskringkasting (NRK) held the Melodi Grand Prix 1988 at the Château Neuf in Oslo, hosted by Dan Børge Akerø.

==== Competing entries ====
Competing entries
Artist	Song	Composer(s)
Anita Kanstad	"Je ne sais pas"	Anita Kanstad; Bjørn Terje Bråthen
Carsten Loly (Mannen i boksen)	"Jeg lever i en boks"	Lars Kilevold
David Chocron and Band	"Mitt land, og"	David Chocron
Elisabeth Moberg and Terry Heart	"Natten er din og min"	Kristian Lindeman; Trygve Hoff
Iselin Alme and Tor Endresen	"Lengt"	Helge Iberg; Tove Karoline Knutsen
Jahn Teigen	"Glasnost"	Jahn Teigen; Knut Meiner
Jan Eggum	"Deilige drøm"	Jan Eggum
Karina Hjelen and Lars Jones	"Du skal leve"	Lars Jones; Grete Moljord
Karoline Krüger	"For vår jord"	Anita Skorgan; Erik Hillestad
Lise Haavik	"Jeg vil elske deg"	Lise Haavik
Odd Arvid Eilertsen, Tor Kjelsberg and Sverre Kjelsberg	"Åpne dører"	Odd Arvid Eilertsen; Sverre Kjelsberg; Ragnar Olsen
Ola Fjellvikås	"Hei go go"	Ole Salsten; Marit Vollen
Siri Gellein	"Nå"	Nissa Nyberget; Idar Lind
Stig Gjendem	"Din tur"	Arne Akselvoll
Tore Hansen	"Sove i natt"	Tore Hansen
Trond Armand Larsen and Krist Juuhl	"Hvor er du"	Trond Armand Larsen; Krist Juuhl

==== Semi-finals ====
Before the final, sixteen songs took part over four semi-finals, held as part of the Norwegian talk show LørDan. Four songs were paired in each semi-final, and the winner from each pair, chosen by a panel of 1,000 viewers, qualified for the final, along with two losing songs which were given wildcards.

The first semi-final was held on 30 January 1988. Four songs competed in pairs with the winner from each pair qualifying for the final.

Semi-final 1 – 30 January 1988
R/O	Artist	Song	Viewer Vote	Place	Result
Duel 1
1	Siri Gellein	"Nå"	26.5%	2	—N/a
2	Trond Armand Larsen and Krist Juuhl	"Hvor er du"	73.5%	1	Qualified
Duel 2
3	Anita Kanstad	"Je ne sais pas"	26.4%	2	Wildcard
4	Jahn Teigen	"Glasnost"	73.6%	1	Qualified

The second semi-final was held on 13 February 1988. Four songs competed in pairs with the winner from each pair qualifying for the final.

Semi-final 2 – 13 February 1988
R/O	Artist	Song	Viewer Vote	Place	Result
Duel 1
1	David Chocron and Band	"Mitt land, og"	71%	1	Qualified
2	Jan Eggum	"Deilige drøm"	29%	2	Wildcard
Duel 2
3	Lise Haavik	"Jeg vil elske deg"	44%	2	—N/a
4	Tore Hansen	"Sove i natt"	56%	1	Qualified

The third semi-final was held on 27 February 1988. Four songs competed in pairs with the winner from each pair qualifying for the final.

Semi-final 3 – 27 February 1988
R/O	Artist	Song	Viewer Vote	Place	Result
Duel 1
1	Odd Arvid Eilertsen, Tor Kjelsberg and Sverre Kjelsberg	"Åpne dører"	12%	2	—N/a
2	Ola Fjellvikås	"Hei go go"	88%	1	Qualified
Duel 2
3	Karina Hjelen and Lars Jones	"Du skal leve"	47%	2	—N/a
4	Iselin Alme and Tor Endresen	"Lengt"	53%	1	Qualified

The fourth semi-final was held on 12 March 1988. Four songs competed in pairs with the winner from each pair qualifying for the final.

Semi-final 4 – 12 March 1988
R/O	Artist	Song	Viewer Vote	Place	Result
Duel 1
1	Stig Gjendem	"Din tur"	23%	2	—N/a
2	Karoline Krüger	"For vår jord"	77%	1	Qualified
Duel 2
3	Elisabeth Moberg and Terry Heart	"Natten er din og min"	69%	1	Qualified
4	Carsten Loly (Mannen i boksen)	"Jeg lever i en boks"	31%	2	—N/a

==== Final ====
Ten songs took part in the final, with the winner chosen by voting from seven regional juries. Other participants included three-time Norwegian representative and Melodi Grand Prix regular Jahn Teigen, and Tor Endresen, who would represent Norway in 1997.

Final – 26 March 1988
R/O	Artist	Song	Points	Place
1	David Chocron and Band	"Mitt land og"	42	5
2	Ola Fjellvikås	"Hei go go"	54	3
3	Elisabeth Moberg and Terry Heart	"Natten er din og min"	38	7
4	Jahn Teigen	"Glasnost"	55	2
5	Jan Eggum	"Deilige drøm"	16	10
6	Tore Hansen	"Sove i natt"	41	6
7	Trond Armand Larsen and Krist Juuhl	"Hvor er du"	18	9
8	Karoline Krüger	"For vår jord"	65	1
9	Anita Kanstad	"Je ne sais pas"	25	8
10	Iselin Alme and Tor Endresen	"Lengt"	52	4

Detailed Regional Jury Votes
R/O	Song	Vadsø	Bodø	Trondheim	Lillehammer	Bergen	Oslo	Kristiansand	Total
1	"Mitt land og"	5	8	6	7	2	10	4	42
2	"Hei go go"	6	5	10	10	8	8	7	54
3	"Natten er din og min"	2	10	4	2	6	6	8	38
4	"Glasnost"	8	2	8	12	10	5	10	55
5	"Deilige drøm"	1	6	1	1	1	3	3	16
6	"Sove i natt"	12	4	5	4	7	4	5	41
7	"Hvor er du"	3	3	2	3	3	2	2	18
8	"For vår jord"	7	7	12	8	12	7	12	65
9	"Je ne sais pas"	10	1	3	5	4	1	1	25
9	"Lengt"	4	12	7	6	5	12	6	52

== At Eurovision ==
On the night of the final Krüger performed 15th in the running order, following Greece and preceding Belgium. At the close of voting "For vår jord" had picked up 88 points (including a maximum 12 from the United Kingdom), placing Norway 5th of the 21 entries. The Norwegian jury awarded its 12 points to Sweden.

=== Voting ===
Points awarded to Norway
Score	Country
12 points	United Kingdom
10 points	Yugoslavia
8 points	Ireland; Sweden
7 points	Finland; Greece; Netherlands; Portugal
6 points	
5 points	Denmark; Iceland
4 points	Italy
3 points	Austria; Belgium
2 points	
1 point	Germany; Israel

Points awarded by Norway
Score	Country
12 points	Sweden
10 points	Denmark
8 points	Switzerland
7 points	Ireland
6 points	Luxembourg
5 points	United Kingdom
4 points	Germany
3 points	Italy
2 points	Spain
1 point	France
