= Jump the Gun (band) =

Irish pop and rock band

- Origin: Ireland
- Genre: Rock / Pop
- Years active: 1984–1990
- Past members: Roy Taylor; Eric Sharpe; Peter Eades; Jimmy Compton; Ciaran Wilde; Brian O'Reilly

Jump the Gun were an Irish pop and rock band, best known for competing in the Eurovision Song Contest 1988 with the song "Take Him Home". They scored 79 points, finishing eighth in the contest. The song spent five weeks in the Irish Singles Chart in 1988, peaking at number three.

The group consisted of Roy Taylor on lead vocals and bass guitar with Eric Sharpe on guitar, Peter Eades on piano and keyboards, Brian O'Reilly on drums, and Ciaran Wilde on saxophone. O'Reilly and Wilde joined the group shortly before Eurovision 1988, while original drummer Jimmy Compton quit in protest of them entering.

Taylor had experienced success in Ireland during the late 1970s/early 1980s as part of the group, Roy Taylor, Karen Black and the Nevada. The other members of the group had all been members of Irish show bands during the 1980s.

Singer and bass player Roy Taylor died of motor neurone disease on 1 June 2023. He was 66.

== Discography ==
Singles:

- 1984 - "Western Road" (Midas Records)
- 1985 - "Two Can Play" (Libra Records)
- 1987 - "Bad Habits" (Bus Records)
- 1988 - "Take Him Home" (Monitor Records) IRE #3
- 1990 - "Peaceful Paradise" (with Lorraine McCourt) IRE #30

Awards and achievements
Preceded by Johnny Logan with "Hold Me Now"	Ireland in the Eurovision Song Contest; 1988	Succeeded by Kiev Connolly and The Missing Passengers with "The Real Me"
