= Marjorie (singer) =

- Born: Marjo-Riitta Nieminen; 15 December 1965; Valkeakoski, Finland
- Died: 13 October 2024 (aged 58)
- Genres: Schlager music
- Instrument: Vocals

Marjo-Riitta Nieminen (15 December 1965 – 13 October 2024), known by her stage name Marjorie, was a Finnish singer who recorded Schlager music and pop music. She was a coloratura soprano.

== Biography ==
Marjorie received an electric harmonica at the age of five and started playing the piano at the age of six. Marjorie founded her first band, Albatross, in 1986, when she also began touring regularly. At the same time, the singer studied music education at the University of Jyväskylä and classical singing at the Central Finland Conservatory with Maila Haavisto. She graduated with a Master of Philosophy in 1991.

In 1988, Marjorie participated in the Finnish Eurovision Song Contest pre-selection competition with Eeva Kiviharju's composition "Tie". She performed on the Kivikasvot show. She tried her own variety show performances in 1992, 1994 and 1996. Marjorie also participated in the Eurovision pre-selections in 1989 with the song "Kahden juhla", in 1990 with the song "Tuuli " and in 1993 as a guest artist with the songs "Legenda" and "Aika täätää väin täätä".

Marjorie recorded her first solo album, Huone 213, in 1992. This and the album Auringon häät, released two years later, were released on EMI's Odeon label. Her third solo album was Täyttä elämää, released in 1998. In 2001, the live album Rakkausten kirtkulku, based on a concert tour with Marjorie, Eija Kantola and Anneli Saaristo, was released. The best-known of Marjorie's recordings are "Huone 213", "Täyttä elämää", "Korttitalo vaan" (ABBA's "The Winner Takes It All"), "Warum" and "Jouluyön rauha " , recorded as a duet with Jari Sillanpää.

Marjorie performed in musicals at Seinäjoki City Theatre, Tampere Theatre and Comedy Theatre Arena, among others, and the singer's voice has been heard in the Walt Disney animated film Mary Poppins and as the interpreter of the theme melody for Toy Story 2.

Marjorie died on 13 October 2024 at the age of 58. She was twice married and has a daughter named Katariina, who also sings.

== Albums ==
- Huone 213 (CD, Odeon 1992)
- Valaiskoon (CD, 1993) - a charity album made largely by musicians from Central Finland, which supported the Finnish Church Aid Somalia project
- Auringon häät (CD, Odeon 1994)
- Retkipatjan tarinoita (CD, Teatteri Eurooppa Neljä 1996)
- Täyttä elämää (CD, Hot Shots 1998)
- Rakkausten kirtkulku (CD, AXR 2001)

== See also ==
- List of songs by Marjorie

== Sources ==
- Latva, Tony & Tuunainen, Petri: Iskelmän tähtitaivas. 500 suomalaista viihdetaiteilijaa. WSOY, 2004. ISBN 9510278173
