= Turkey in the Eurovision Song Contest 1988 =

- Eurovision Song Contest 1988
- Participating broadcaster: Turkish Radio and Television Corporation (TRT)
- Country: Turkey
- Selection process: 12. Eurovision Şarkı Yarışması Türkiye Finali
- Selection date: 13 February 1988

Competing entry
- Song: "Sufi"
- Artist: MFÖ
- Songwriters: Mazhar Alanson; Fuat Güner; Özkan Uğur

Placement
- Final result: 15th, 37 points

Participation chronology

Turkey was represented at the Eurovision Song Contest 1988 with the song "Sufi", written by Mazhar Alanson, Fuat Güner, and Özkan Uğur, and performed by themselves under their stage name MFÖ. The Turkish participating broadcaster, the Turkish Radio and Television Corporation (TRT), selected its entry through a national final. MFÖ had already represented Turkey at the 1985 contest.

== Before Eurovision ==
=== 12. Eurovision Şarkı Yarışması Türkiye Finali ===
The national final featured songs written by seventeen composers directly invited by the Turkish Radio and Television Corporation (TRT). However, Attila Özdemiroğlu, one of the invited composers, did not submit a song for unknown reasons.

The final took place on 13 February 1988 at the TRT Studios in Ankara, hosted by Canan Kumbasar. Sixteen songs competed and the winner was determined by an expert jury. As there was a tie at the end of the voting, the head of the jury selected "Sufi" performed by MFÖ as the winner.

Final – 13 February 1988
R/O	Artist	Song	Lyricist	Composer	Place
1	Kayahan & 3. Nesil	"Sokak Kedisi"	Kayahan Açar		—N/a
2	Grup Gündoğarken	"Resimler Resimler"	İlhan Şeşen		—N/a
3	MFÖ	"Sufi"	Mazhar Alanson	Mazhar Alanson; Fuat Güner; Özkan Uğur	1
4	Sevingül Bahadır	"Bulutlar"	Meltem Bal	Aslıgül Kırıcı	—N/a
5	Grup Tema	"Zig Zag"	Mazhar Alanson	Selçuk Başar	—N/a
6	Grup Vizyon	"Diskotek"	İlhan İrem	Esin Engin	—N/a
7	Grup 88	"Fazla Vaktim Yok"	Nezih Topuzlu	Selmi Andak	—N/a
8	Aysun Kocatepe	"Bir Dolu Yaz"	Ali Kocatepe		—N/a
9	Cantekin	"Kim?"	Zeynep Sayan	Erol Sayan	—N/a
10	Grup Piramit	"Sana Bağlamıştım"	Grup Piramit		—N/a
11	Grup Denk	"Onikiden"	Bora Ebeoğlu	Turhan Yükseler	2
12	Grup Efekt	"Camdan Bir Ev"	Zeynep Talu	Melih Kibar	—N/a
13	Ultraviyole	"Yurtta Barış Dünyada Barış"	İlhan İrem		—N/a
14	Zafer Olcay	"Barış ve Sevgi Dolu"	Adnan Ergil	Buğra Uğur	—N/a
15	Emel Müftüoğlu & Erdal Çelik	"Aşk Yaşamaya Değer"	Emel Müftüoğlu; Erdal Çelik	Uğur Başar	—N/a
16	Fatih Erkoç	"Bitmesin Bu Sonbahar"	Cansın Erol	Selahattin İçli	—N/a

== At Eurovision ==
On the night of the contest MFÖ performed fifth, after the United Kingdom and before the Netherlands. At the close of the voting Sufi had received 37 points, placing Turkey fifteenth. The Turkish jury awarded its 12 points to the United Kingdom.

=== Voting ===
Points awarded to Turkey
Score	Country
12 points	
10 points	
8 points	Germany; Israel
7 points	
6 points	France
5 points	Spain
4 points	Luxembourg; Sweden
3 points	
2 points	
1 point	Netherlands; United Kingdom

Points awarded by Turkey
Score	Country
12 points	United Kingdom
10 points	Switzerland
8 points	France
7 points	Yugoslavia
6 points	Netherlands
5 points	Spain
4 points	Italy
3 points	Greece
2 points	Ireland
1 point	Germany
