= Germany in the Eurovision Song Contest 1988 =

- Eurovision Song Contest 1988
- Participating broadcaster: ARD (Note: Arbeitsgemeinschaft der öffentlich-rechtlichen Rundfunkanstalten der Bundesrepublik Deutschland) – Bayerischer Rundfunk (BR)
- Country: Germany
- Selection process: Ein Lied für Dublin
- Selection date: 31 March 1988

Competing entry
- Song: "Lied für einen Freund"
- Artist: Maxi & Chris Garden
- Songwriters: Ralph Siegel; Bernd Meinunger

Placement
- Final result: 14th, 48 points

Participation chronology

Germany was represented at the Eurovision Song Contest 1988 with the song "Lied für einen Freund", composed by Ralph Siegel, with lyrics by Bernd Meinunger, and performed by Maxi & Chris Garden. The German participating broadcaster on behalf of ARD, Bayerischer Rundfunk (BR), selected their entry through a national final. Maxi & Chris Garden had finished second in the 1987 national final.

== Before Eurovision ==
=== Ein Lied für Dublin ===
Bayerischer Rundfunk (BR) held the national final on 31 March 1988 at the Frankenhalle in Nuremberg, hosted by Jenny Jürgens. The national final was broadcast on Erstes Deutsches Fernsehen and on radio station WDR 4.

Twelve acts presented their entries live and the winner was selected by a panel of approximately 600 people who had been selected as providing a representative cross-section of the German public. Among the other participants was Cindy Berger, who had represented Germany in 1974 as half of Cindy and Bert.

One of the songs which failed to qualify for the 1988 German national final, "Das Beste" by male-female duo Duett, later became embroiled in controversy when it was entered by the same performers in the 1990 Austrian national final, which it duly won in dramatic circumstances after the female singer had appeared to faint onstage during the initial performance. When the song's previous history subsequently came to light, Austrian broadcaster ORF had no choice but to disqualify it as a clear violation of Eurovision rules, handing the 1990 Austrian ticket to original runner-up Simone Stelzer.

Final – 31 March 1988
| R/O | Artist | Song | Songwriter(s) | Points | Place |
|---|---|---|---|---|---|
| 1 | Thomas and Thomas | "Träumen kann man nie zuviel" | Jean Frankfurter; Irma Holder | 2,388 | 12 |
| 2 | Tommy Steiner | "Insel im Wind" | Hanne Haller; Bernd Meinunger; Ramona Leiß | 3,185 | 6 |
| 3 | Tammy Swift | "Tanzen geh'n" | Ralph Siegel; Bernd Meinunger | 3,172 | 7 |
| 4 | Bernhard Brink and Gilda | "Komm' ins Paradies" | Matthias Reim; Jörg Wiesner; Ingrid Reith | 3,538 | 3 |
| 5 | Michaela | "Ein kleines Wunder" | Rainer Pietsch; Bernd Meinunger | 3,171 | 8 |
| 6 | G. G. Anderson | "Hättest du heut' Zeit für mich" | Ekki Stein; G. G. Anderson; Siegward Kastning | 3,508 | 4 |
| 7 | Rendezvous | "Du bist ein Stern für mich" | Hans-Rolf Schade; Werner Petersburg; Jutta Gröters | 2,826 | 10 |
| 8 | Ann Thomas | "Regenbogenland" | Hanne Haller; Bernd Meinunger; Ramona Leiß | 3,351 | 5 |
| 9 | Heartware | "Ich geb' dir mein Herz" | Jacques van Eijck; John Möring | 3,021 | 9 |
| 10 | Maxi & Chris Garden | "Lied für einen Freund" | Ralph Siegel; Bernd Meinunger | 4,475 | 1 |
| 11 | Christian Francke | "In deiner Hand" | Christian Franke; Andrea Andergast | 2,596 | 11 |
| 12 | Cindy Berger | "Und leben will ich auch" | Rainer Pietsch; Bernd Meinunger | 3,769 | 2 |

== At Eurovision ==
On the evening of the final the duo performed 11th in the running order, following Ireland and preceding Austria. At the close of voting, "Lied für einen Freund" had received 48 points, placing Germany 14th of the 21 entries. The German jury awarded its 12 points to contest winners Switzerland.

The contest was broadcast on Erstes Deutsches Fernsehen, with commentary by 1982 winner Nicole and Claus-Erich Boetzkes. The show was watched by 8.61 million viewers in Germany.

=== Voting ===
Points awarded to Germany
| Score | Country |
|---|---|
| 12 points | |
| 10 points | |
| 8 points | Iceland; Yugoslavia |
| 7 points | |
| 6 points | Denmark; Ireland |
| 5 points | Israel; United Kingdom |
| 4 points | Norway |
| 3 points | Spain |
| 2 points | Portugal |
| 1 point | Turkey |

Points awarded by Germany
| Score | Country |
|---|---|
| 12 points | Switzerland |
| 10 points | United Kingdom |
| 8 points | Turkey |
| 7 points | Ireland |
| 6 points | Netherlands |
| 5 points | Israel |
| 4 points | Denmark |
| 3 points | France |
| 2 points | Italy |
| 1 point | Norway |
