= Finland in the Eurovision Song Contest 1988 =

- Eurovision Song Contest 1988
- Participating broadcaster: Yleisradio (Yle)
- Country: Finland
- Selection process: National final
- Selection date: 13 February 1988

Competing entry
- Song: "Nauravat silmät muistetaan"
- Artist: Boulevard
- Songwriters: Pepe Willberg; Kirsti Willberg

Placement
- Final result: 20th, 3 points

Participation chronology

Finland was represented at the Eurovision Song Contest 1988 with the song "Nauravat silmät muistetaan", composed by Pepe Willberg, with lyrics by Kirsti Willberg, and performed by the band Boulevard. The Finnish participating broadcaster, Yleisradio (Yle), selected its entry in the contest through a national final.

== Before Eurovision ==
=== National final ===
Twelve entries were selected for the competition from 233 received submissions. Yleisradio (Yle) held the national final on 13 February 1988 at the Kulttuuritalo in Helsinki, hosted by Sini Sovijärvi. Twelve songs took part with the winner chosen by voting from six regional juries. Each jury group distributed their points as follows: 1–6, 8 and 10 points. Other participants included former Finnish representatives Ami Aspelund (1983) and Sonja Lumme (1985). Two of the songs, Helena Miller's "Svart och vitt" and Benny Törnroos's "I november", were written in Swedish; the other 10 songs were written in Finnish.

In addition to the performances of the competing entries, the interval act featured Jarkko Toivonen performing "Batacuda" and "Brazil".

Final – 13 February 1988
R/O	Artist	Song	Songwriter(s)	Points	Place
1	Boulevard	"Nauravat silmät muistetaan"	Pepe Willberg; Kirsti Willberg	38	1
2	Tarja Ylitalo	"Maata vaadin taivaanrantaa"	Jyrki Niemi; Mika Sundqvist	2	12
3	Helena Miller	"Svart och vitt"	Veikko Samuli; Marita Lindquist	37	2
4	Kari Tapio	"Tää kaipuu"	Kari Kuuva	12	9
5	Ami Aspelund	"Amor amor"	Petri Laaksonen; VeePee Lehto	32	3
6	Sonja Lumme	"Vielä jaksan odottaa"	Matti Siitonen	9	10
7	Tauski Peltonen	"Uuteen elämään"	Esko M. Toivonen	13	8
8	Benny Törnroos	"I november"	Roni Kamras; Marita Lindquist; Benny Törnroos	8	11
9	Mikko Alatalo	"Tuhat ja yksi yöta"	Pertti Niemi; Jorma Toiviainen	19	6
10	Marjorie	"Tie"	Eeva Kiviharju	20	5
11	Timo, Jonna and Beat	"Mayday Mayday"	Timo Tervo; Turkka Mali	29	4
12	Tauski, Tutta and Christa	"Lasikaupunki"	Kari Kuuva	15	7

Detailed Regional Jury Votes
R/O	Song	Rovaniemi	Turku	Jyväskylä	Kajaani	Helsinki	Joensuu	Total
1	"Nauravat silmät muistetaan"	3	8	5	8	8	6	38
2	"Maata vaadin taivaanrantaa"			2				2
3	"Svart och vitt"	10	5	6		6	10	37
4	"Tää kaipuu"		1	4	4		3	12
5	"Amor amor"	8	6	3	2	5	8	32
6	"Vielä jaksan odottaa"	6			1	2		9
7	"Uuteen elämään"		2		6	1	4	13
8	"I november"	4	4					8
9	"Tuhat ja yksi yöta"	5	3	1	5	4	1	19
10	"Tie"	2		8		10		20
11	"Mayday Mayday"	1	10	10	3		5	29
12	"Lasikaupunki"				10	3	2	15

== At Eurovision ==
On the night of the final Boulevard performed third in the running order, following Sweden and preceding the United Kingdom. The band had to deal with a technical malfunction when the backing track temporarily faded out halfway through the song. At the close of voting "Nauravat silmät muistetaan" had received only 3 points, placing Finland 20th of the 21 entries, ahead only of the nul-points song from Austria. The Finnish jury awarded its 12 points to Luxembourg.

Among the members of the Finnish jury was Ilpo Hakasalo.

=== Voting ===
Points awarded to Finland
Score	Country
12 points	
10 points	
8 points	
7 points	
6 points	
5 points	
4 points	
3 points	Israel
2 points	
1 point	

Points awarded by Finland
Score	Country
12 points	Luxembourg
10 points	United Kingdom
8 points	Italy
7 points	Norway
6 points	Israel
5 points	Switzerland
4 points	Denmark
3 points	France
2 points	Ireland
1 point	Yugoslavia
