= Ireland in the Eurovision Song Contest 1988 =

- Eurovision Song Contest 1988
- Participating broadcaster: Radio Telefís Éireann (RTÉ)
- Country: Ireland
- Selection process: Eurosong '88
- Selection date: 6 March 1988

Competing entry
- Song: "Take Him Home"
- Artist: Jump the Gun
- Songwriter: Peter Eades

Placement
- Final result: 8th, 79 points

Participation chronology

Ireland was represented at the Eurovision Song Contest 1988 with the song "Take Him Home", written by Peter Eades, and performed by Jump the Gun. The Irish participating broadcaster, Radio Telefís Éireann (RTÉ), selected its entry through a national final. In addition, RTÉ was also the host broadcaster and staged the event at the RDS Simmonscourt Pavilion in Dublin, after winning the previous edition with the song "Hold Me Now" by Johnny Logan.

== Before Eurovision ==
=== Eurosong '88 ===
Radio Telefís Éireann (RTÉ) held on 6 March 1988 at the Olympia Theatre in Dublin, the national final, Eurosong '88, hosted for the second year in succession by Marty Whelan (who would provide commentary for RTÉ's broadcast of the contest from 2000 onwards, although he did provided the television commentary once before, in 1987), and Maxi (who had represented Ireland in 1973 as a soloist, and again in 1981 as part of the group Sheeba). Eight songs competed in the event, and the winner was selected by a panel of twelve "experts", each of whom awarded each song a score from one to eight points. One member of the panel was Sandy Kelly who had represented Ireland in 1982 as a member of The Duskeys.

Liam Reilly would go on to represent Ireland in 1990 (finishing joint 2nd with France). Reilly would also compose the Irish entry in 1991.

R/O	Artist	Song	Points	Place
1	Tranz-Am	"Tearing Up My Heart"	44	7
2	Fabienne	"Dance to My Own Tune"	36	8
3	Timara Galassi	"Friends Forever"	58	5
4	Paul Duffy	"Stop Messin' Around"	70	3
5	Grace Dunne	"Tar Liom Anois"	53	6
6	Jump the Gun	"Take Him Home"	92	1
7	Liam Reilly	"Lifeline"	85	2
8	Leanne and Hotline	"In and Out of Love"	60	4

Detailed Jury Votes
R/O	Song	Kevin Sharkey	Sandy Kelly	Deke O'Brien	Maria Doyle	Michael O'Riordan	Olivia Treacy	Kevin Hough	Jane Cassidy	Alf McCarthy	Fiona Looney	Peter Collins	John Buckley	Total
1	"Tearing Up My Heart"	3	4	3	3	5	5	4	3	3	3	4	4	44
2	"Dance to My Own Tune"	3	2	2	4	4	4	3	3	2	2	4	3	36
3	"Friends Forever"	4	5	4	3	6	6	5	6	4	5	5	5	58
4	"Stop Messin' Around"	5	7	5	5	8	8	7	4	5	5	5	6	70
5	"Tar Liom Anois"	5	4	6	2	5	4	4	5	4	4	6	4	53
6	"Take Him Home"	8	8	8	8	7	8	8	8	8	7	7	7	92
7	"Lifeline"	7	7	7	6	8	7	7	7	7	7	8	7	85
8	"In and Out of Love"	4	6	5	3	5	6	6	4	5	5	6	5	60

== At Eurovision ==
"Take Him Home" was performed tenth in the running order on the night of the contest, following Switzerland and preceding Germany. At the close of the voting sequence, the song had received 79 points, placing eighth out of 21 songs.

Mike Murphy was providing the commentary for RTÉ 1 viewers, whilst Larry Gogan was commentating for listeners on RTÉ Radio 1. RTÉ appointed John Skehan as its spokesperson to announce the Irish jury's votes.

=== Voting ===
Points awarded to Ireland
Score	Country
12 points	Spain
10 points	
8 points	
7 points	Denmark; Germany; Norway; Sweden
6 points	Austria; Netherlands
5 points	Belgium; Portugal
4 points	France; Switzerland
3 points	United Kingdom
2 points	Finland; Turkey; Yugoslavia
1 point	

Points awarded by Ireland
Score	Country
12 points	Luxembourg
10 points	Switzerland
8 points	Norway
7 points	United Kingdom
6 points	Germany
5 points	Sweden
4 points	Denmark
3 points	Yugoslavia
2 points	Netherlands
1 point	Israel
