= Scott Fitzgerald (singer) =

Scottish singer and actor (born 1948)

- Born: William McPhail; 28 April 1948 (age 78); Glasgow, Scotland
- Genres: Musical theatre, glam rock, pop
- Occupations: Musician, actor
- Instrument: Vocals
- Years active: 1970s–present
- Labels: GTO, United Artists, RCA

Scott Fitzgerald (born William McPhail; 28 April 1948) is a Scottish singer and musical actor, who experienced international music chart success in the 1970s and later represented the United Kingdom at the Eurovision Song Contest 1988 where he finished second, only one point behind Celine Dion.

== Career ==
Fitzgerald was born in Glasgow, Scotland, and began his career on the GTO label, releasing the singles "Judy Played The Jukebox" in 1974 and the title track to glam rock movie Never Too Young To Rock in 1975, where he featured alongside glam rock acts Mud, The Glitter Band and The Rubettes.

=== "If I Had Words" ===
Fitzgerald's greatest success was with "If I Had Words", a duet with Yvonne Keeley and also featuring the St. Thomas More School Choir. The lyrics and arrangement were by Jonathan Hodge, a prolific writer of television jingles and movie themes, who also produced the single. The tune was taken from the main theme of the Maestoso from Saint-Saëns Symphony No. 3 in C minor (Symphony with organ) with an added reggae beat. It reached number 3 in the UK Singles Chart in 1978, and later went on to be a hit in Australia, Ireland, New Zealand, Belgium, the Netherlands and Scandinavia, selling more than one million copies.

The song also featured in the score for the 1995 film Babe, sung both by Farmer Hoggett (James Cromwell) and by a trio of mice (a sped-up version of Fitzgerald's original). It was partially incorporated into the film's suite (instrumental). In 1999, the band Westlife collaborated with the Vard Sisters to record the song.

=== Eurovision ===
In 1988, he was the first ever artist chosen by telephone vote to sing the UK's entry in the Eurovision Song Contest with the song "Go". The song was written and composed by Julie Forsyth, daughter of the entertainer Bruce Forsyth. Forsyth joined Fitzgerald on stage at the contest in Dublin, alongside her husband Dominic Grant (also of Guys 'n' Dolls) and Des Dyer (formerly of Jigsaw), to perform backing vocals. Ronnie Hazlehurst conducted the live orchestration. Fitzgerald came second in the contest, by one point, to Switzerland's winning entry performed by Celine Dion. "Go" reached number 52 in the UK Singles Chart in April 1988.

Fitzgerald reunited with Yvonne Keeley in 1992 for the single "United We Stand", which was released on Red Bullet Records. In 2010 Fitzgerald and Keeley reunited for the final time in an all star version of ''If I had words'' for Charity in the Netherlands which featured Gordon, Patricia Paay, Thomas Berge and many others.

== Personal life ==
Fitzgerald is married to Shereen Fitzgerald and has three children – Liam Paul Patrick McPhail (from a previous relationship), Neeley Fitzgerald, and the singer-songwriter Ki Fitzgerald, an original member of the UK boy band Busted and hit songwriter to artists around the world. His son co-wrote Monsters for Saara Aalto's Finland entry into Eurovision Song Contest 2018, adding to the family's Eurovision history.

Awards and achievements
| Preceded by Rikki with "Only the Light" | United Kingdom in the Eurovision Song Contest; 1988 | Succeeded by Live Report with "Why Do I Always Get it Wrong?" |
