= Spain in the Eurovision Song Contest 1988 =

- Eurovision Song Contest 1988
- Participating broadcaster: Televisión Española (TVE)
- Country: Spain
- Selection process: Internal selection
- Announcement date: Artist: 16 March 1988

Competing entry
- Song: "La chica que yo quiero (Made in Spain)"
- Artist: La Década
- Songwriters: Enrique Piero; Francisco Dondiego

Placement
- Final result: 11th, 58 points

Participation chronology

Spain was represented at the Eurovision Song Contest 1988 with the song "La chica que yo quiero (Made in Spain)", composed by Enrique Piero, with lyrics by Francisco Dondiego, and performed by the group La Década Prodigiosa credited as La Década. The Spanish participating broadcaster, Televisión Española (TVE), internally selected its entry for the contest. The song, performed in position 6, placed eleventh out of twenty-one competing entries with 58 points.

== Before Eurovision ==
Televisión Española (TVE) internally selected "La chica que yo quiero (Made in Spain)" performed by the group La Década Prodigiosa as its entry for the Eurovision Song Contest 1988. The song was composed by Enrique Piero, and had lyrics by Francisco Dondiego. The members of the group were Manolo Aguilar, Cecilia Blanco, Ana Nery Fragoso, Javier de Juan, Carmelo Martínez, Manuel Rodríguez, Manuel Santisteban, and José Subiza. They were announced as the performers on 16 March 1988. For the contest, they were credited simply as La Década. The name of the song and the songwriters were announced on 21 March.

== At Eurovision ==
On 30 April 1988, the Eurovision Song Contest was held at the RDS Simmonscourt Pavilion in Dublin hosted by Radio Telefís Éireann (RTÉ), and broadcast live throughout the continent. La Década performed "La chica que yo quiero (Made in Spain)" 6th on the evening, following Turkey and preceding the Netherlands. They were dressed for the occasion by Francis Montesinos and Antonio Alvarado. Since the contest rules only allow a maximum of six people on stage, and as they were a group of eight members, de Juan conducted the event's orchestra, and Martínez was left out. At the close of the voting the Spanish entry had received 58 points, placing 11th in a field of 21.

TVE broadcast the contest in Spain on TVE 2 with commentary by Beatriz Pécker. Before the event, TVE aired a talk show hosted by Marta Sánchez introducing the Spanish jury, which continued after the contest commenting on the results.

=== Voting ===
TVE assembled a jury panel with sixteen members. The following members comprised the Spanish jury:

- Laura Valenzuela – television presenter, presented the 1969 contest
- María Vidaurreta – teacher
- José Coronado – actor
- Jaime Adrada – architect
- Caty Arteaga – ballet dancer
- Antonio de Senillosa – writer
- Paquita Torres – Miss Europe 1967
- Mario Pardo – actor
- Pepe Oneto – journalist
- Jorge Sanz – actor
- Emma Suárez – actress
- Lola Forner – actress, Miss Spain 1979
- Miguel Báez Spínola "El Litri" – bullfighter
- Analía Gadé – actress
- Pepe Barroso – businessman
- Cyra Toledo – model

The jury was chaired by Matilde Jarrín. The jury awarded its maximum of 12 points to Ireland.

Points awarded to Spain
Score	Country
12 points	
10 points	
8 points	Austria; Greece; Italy
7 points	
6 points	Belgium; Luxembourg; Switzerland
5 points	Turkey
4 points	Yugoslavia
3 points	
2 points	Iceland; Israel; Norway
1 point	Denmark

Points awarded by Spain
Score	Country
12 points	Ireland
10 points	United Kingdom
8 points	Switzerland
7 points	Italy
6 points	Israel
5 points	Turkey
4 points	Portugal
3 points	Germany
2 points	France
1 point	Denmark
