= Eurovision Song Contest 1988 =

International song competition

Date and venue
- Final: 30 April 1988
- Venue: RDS Simmonscourt Pavilion; Dublin, Ireland

Organisation
- Organiser: European Broadcasting Union (EBU)
- Scrutineer: Frank Naef

Production
- Host broadcaster: Radio Telefís Éireann (RTÉ)
- Director: Declan Lowney
- Executive producer: Liam Miller
- Musical director: Noel Kelehan
- Presenters: Pat Kenny; Michelle Rocca

Participants
- Number of entries: 21
- Non-returning countries: Cyprus
- Participation map: Competing countries Countries that participated in the past but not in 1988

Vote
- Voting system: Each country awarded 12, 10, 8-1 point(s) to their 10 favourite songs
- Winning song: Switzerland "Ne partez pas sans moi"

The Eurovision Song Contest 1988 was the 33rd edition of the Eurovision Song Contest, held on 30 April 1988 at the RDS Simmonscourt Pavilion in Dublin, Ireland, and presented by Pat Kenny and Michelle Rocca. It was organised by the European Broadcasting Union (EBU) and host broadcaster Radio Telefís Éireann (RTÉ), who staged the event after winning the 1987 contest for Ireland with the song "Hold Me Now" by Johnny Logan.

Broadcasters from 22 countries submitted entries, however, Cyprus ultimately rescinded its entry after its selected song was determined to have been performed several years prior to the contest, breaking the contest rules. The winner was Switzerland with the song "Ne partez pas sans moi", composed by Atilla Şereftuğ, with lyrics by Nella Martinetti, and performed by Céline Dion. It was Switzerland's second contest win, and remains as of 2026 the last winning song to be performed in French. The United Kingdom, Denmark, Luxembourg, and Norway rounded out the top five positions, with the UK achieving its eleventh runner-up placing, while Austria placed last for the sixth time, receiving nul points for the second time.

== Location ==
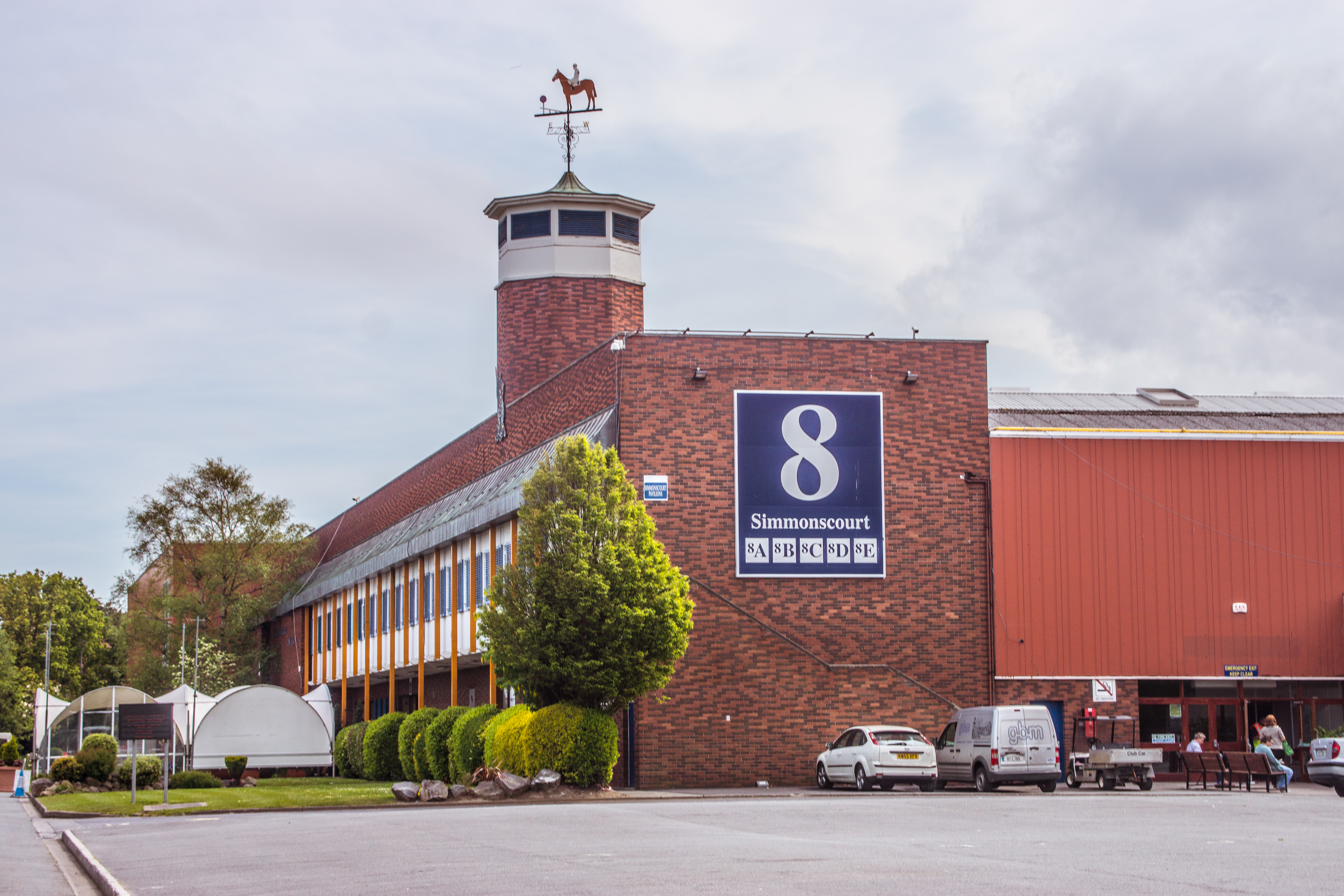
RDS Simmonscourt Pavilion – host venue of the 1988 contest

The 1988 contest took place in Dublin, Ireland, following the country's victory at the 1987 edition with the song "Hold Me Now", performed by Johnny Logan. It was the third time that Ireland hosted the contest, following the 1971 and 1981 events also held in Dublin.

The selected venue was the Simmonscourt Pavilion of the Royal Dublin Society, a multi-purpose venue in the Ballsbridge area of the city and previous host of the contest in 1981. RDS Simmonscourt, following construction of the stage and other technical elements, was expected to accommodate approximately 1,500 audience members.

== Participants ==
Eurovision Song Contest 1988 – Participation summaries by country
- Austria; Belgium; ~~Cyprus~~; Denmark; Finland; France; Germany; Greece; Iceland; Ireland; Israel; Italy; Luxembourg; Netherlands; Norway; Portugal; Spain; Sweden; Switzerland; Turkey; United Kingdom; Yugoslavia

Broadcasters from the same 22 countries that participated the previous year submitted entries for the 1988 contest, with the draw to determine the running order of the entries held on 11 December 1987. However, a number of weeks before the event, it was discovered that the song selected to represent Cyprus, "Thimame", written by John Vickers and Aristos Moschovakis, and sung by Yiannis Dimitrou, previously competed in the 1984 Cypriot national selection under the title "San to rok-en-rol", and was therefore ineligible to compete at the contest. The Cyprus Broadcasting Corporation (CyBC) subsequently announced on 12 March 1988 that it nullified the selection of "Thimame" as its entry; as the rules of the national selection did not provide for a second-placed song to be declared, and as there was not enough time to stage a second selection process to determine a replacement entry, CyBC was ultimately unable to participate in the contest.

Several artists who competed in the 1988 edition of the contest participated in the previous editions for the same country. Tommy Körberg represented Sweden in 1969; the duo Hot Eyes, also known as Kirsten and Søren, represented Denmark in 1984 and in 1985; the group MFÖ represented Turkey in 1985; Dora represented Portugal in 1986; and Yardena Arazi returned to compete as a solo artist, after representing Israel in 1976 as part of the group Chocolate Menta Mastik, and co-hosting the 1979 contest. Additionally, Boulevard previously performed as the backing group for Finland in 1987, and among Yardena Arazi's backing vocalists were Yehuda Tamir and Reuven Gvirtz, members of the Israeli group Milk and Honey that won the contest for Israel in 1979.

Each participating delegation could nominate a separate musical director to lead the orchestra during its country's performance, with the host musical director also available to conduct for those countries that did not nominate their own conductor. All entries were accompanied by the orchestra, except for Iceland and Italy, who were accompanied solely by backing track. In the case of the Italian entry, the backing track used featured the contest's first fade-out ending.

Eurovision Song Contest 1988 participants
Country	Broadcaster	Artist	Song	Language	Songwriter(s)	Conductor
Austria	ORF	Wilfried	"Lisa Mona Lisa"	German	Ronnie Herbholzheimer; Klaus Kofler; Wilfried Scheutz	Harald Neuwirth
Belgium	RTBF	Reynaert	"Laissez briller le soleil"	French	Philippe Anciaux; Joseph Reynaerts; Dany Willem	Dany Willem
Denmark	DR	Hot Eyes	"Ka' du se hva' jeg sa'"	Danish	Søren Bundgaard; Keld Heick	Henrik Krogsgaard
Finland	YLE	Boulevard	"Nauravat silmät muistetaan"	Finnish	Kirsti Willberg; Pepe Willberg	Ossi Runne
France	Antenne 2	Gérard Lenorman	"Chanteur de charme"	French	Claude Lemesle; Gérard Lenorman	Guy Mattéoni
Germany	BR (Note: On behalf of the German public broadcasting consortium ARD)	Maxi & Chris Garden	"Lied für einen Freund"	German	Bernd Meinunger; Ralph Siegel	Michael Thatcher
Greece	ERT	Afroditi Fryda	"Clown" (Κλόουν)	Greek	Dimitris Sakislis	Haris Andreadis
Iceland	RÚV	Beathoven	"Sókrates"	Icelandic	Sverrir Stormsker	No conductor
Ireland	RTÉ	Jump the Gun	"Take Him Home"	English	Peter Eades	Noel Kelehan
Israel	IBA	Yardena Arazi	"Ben Adam" (בן אדם)	Hebrew	Boris Dimitshtein; Ehud Manor	Eldad Shrem
Italy	RAI	Luca Barbarossa	"Ti scrivo"	Italian	Luca Barbarossa	No conductor
Luxembourg	CLT	Lara Fabian	"Croire"	French	Jacques Cardona; Alain Garcia	Régis Dupré
Netherlands	NOS	Gerard Joling	"Shangri-La"	Dutch	Peter de Wijn	Harry van Hoof
Norway	NRK	Karoline Krüger	"For vår jord"	Norwegian	Erik Hillestad; Anita Skorgan	Arild Stav
Portugal	RTP	Dora	"Voltarei"	Portuguese	José Calvário; José Niza	José Calvário
Spain	TVE	La Década	"La chica que yo quiero (Made in Spain)"	Spanish	Francisco Dondiego; Enrique Piero	Javier de Juan
Sweden	SVT	Tommy Körberg	"Stad i ljus"	Swedish	Py Bäckman	Anders Berglund
Switzerland	SRG SSR	Céline Dion	"Ne partez pas sans moi"	French	Nella Martinetti; Atilla Şereftuğ	Atilla Şereftuğ
Turkey	TRT	MFÖ	"Sufi (Hey Ya Hey)"	Turkish	Mazhar Alanson; Fuat Güner; Özkan Uğur	Turhan Yükseler
United Kingdom	BBC	Scott Fitzgerald	"Go"	English	Julie Forsyth	Ronnie Hazlehurst
Yugoslavia	JRT	Srebrna krila (Note: Credited on screen as "Silver Wings")	"Mangup" (Мангуп)	Serbo-Croatian	Stevo Cvikić; Rajko Dujmić	Nikica Kalogjera

== Production ==
The Eurovision Song Contest 1988 was produced by the Irish public broadcaster Radio Telefís Éireann (RTÉ). Liam Miller served as executive producer, Declan Lowney served as director, Paula Farrell and Michael Grogan served as designers, and Noel Kelehan served as musical director, leading the RTÉ Concert Orchestra. On behalf of the contest organisers, the European Broadcasting Union (EBU), the event was overseen by Frank Naef as executive supervisor. The presenters of the contest were broadcaster Pat Kenny, and television announcer and Miss Ireland 1980 Michelle Rocca; the duo were announced by RTÉ in February 1988 following auditions held in the previous weeks. It was the first time since 1979 that more than one person presented the contest.

Several technical innovations and improvements were introduced with the 1988 contest, spearheaded by Miller and Lowney, whose goal was to increase the contest's appeal among a younger audience. The traditional physical scoreboard was replaced by a computer-generated version, displayed on two video walls provided by Philips and constructed on either side of the stage. These video walls also displayed the performances and footage of the artists in the green room during the voting sequence, allowing the audience in the arena to see the televised footage within the venue for the first time. Similar to the previous year's edition, the 1988 contest implemented a modern feel within both the stage design by Paula Farrell and Michael Grogan, and the graphic design by Maria Quigley. The stage, at over 40 metres (130 ft) in length, was the largest ever built for the contest at that point, and took up almost a third of the 18,000 m^{2} (190,000 sq ft) space within the Simmonscourt Pavilion. The stage design, which created an illusion of depth, alongside tight camera shots of the audience and creative lighting use, resulted in an overall impression that the contest was being held in a vast and packed arena, rather than the modest space of the Simmonscourt Pavilion. To avoid interruptions in the broadcast, the television signal was transmitted to the other broadcasters feeding the Eurovision network by two ways: via the main terrestrial microwave relay link network via Belfast and London, and via satellite as a backup. While it was not the first contest recorded in stereo, it was the first in which the audio signal was transmitted in stereo to the other broadcasters via the Eurovision terrestrial network.

Rehearsals for the participating artists began on 25 April 1988. Two technical rehearsals were conducted for each participating delegation in the week approaching the contest, with countries rehearsing in the order in which they would perform. The first rehearsals, comprising a 15-minute stage call and 35-minute performance, were held on 25 and 26 April, followed by a press conference for each delegation and the accredited press. Each country's second rehearsals were held on 27 and 28 April, with a 10-minute stage call and 25 minutes for performances. On 28 April, the contest venue received a visit from the Taoiseach Charles Haughey. Three dress rehearsals were held with all artists, held in the afternoon and evening of 29 April and in the afternoon of 30 April; the second rehearsal was filmed with a live audience present as a production stand-by in case the live event was disrupted. During the contest week, Sweden's Tommy Körberg had been suffering from a throat infection; although he was able to perform during the event-proper, the songwriter of the Swedish entry, Py Bäckman, performed the entry in his stead at the 29 April evening dress rehearsal.

== Format ==
Each participating country submitted one song limited to three minutes or less and performed in the language, or one of the languages, of the country which it represented. Up to six performers were allowed on stage during each entry, accompanied by the orchestra and/or a backing track; any backing tracks had to include all the instruments featured on stage being mimed by the performers and could not contain vocals of any kind.

The results of the 1988 contest were determined through the scoring system introduced in 1975: each country awarded twelve points to its favourite entry, followed by ten points to its second favourite, and then awarded points in decreasing value from eight to one for the remaining eight songs in the country's top ten, with countries unable to vote for their own entry. The points awarded by each country were determined by an assembled jury of sixteen individuals, who were all required to be members of the public with no connection to the music industry, split evenly between men and women and across four age groups: 15–25, 26–35, 36–45, and 46–60. Each jury member voted in secret and awarded between one and ten votes to each participating song, excluding that from their own country and with no abstentions permitted; these votes were placed at the end of each country's performance and collected and tallied by the non-voting jury chairperson, who determined the points distribution after all countries performed. When two or more songs in the top ten received the same number of votes, a show of hands by all jury members was used to determine the final placing. The jury composition and voting process were modified slightly compared to the 1987 contest, due to the increase in the number of participating countries in recent years, expanding from eleven members who awarded between one and five votes for each song.

As established at the 1970 contest, in the event that two or more countries finished in first place with the same number of points after all countries awarded their points, the artists representing these countries would perform their entries again, and the juries in all countries not involved in the tie-break would determine the winner, with each country's jury selecting their favourite of the entries by a show of hands of all jurors. If after all countries determined their favourites and there was still a tie for first place, the countries involved in this tie would be declared joint winners.

== Contest overview ==
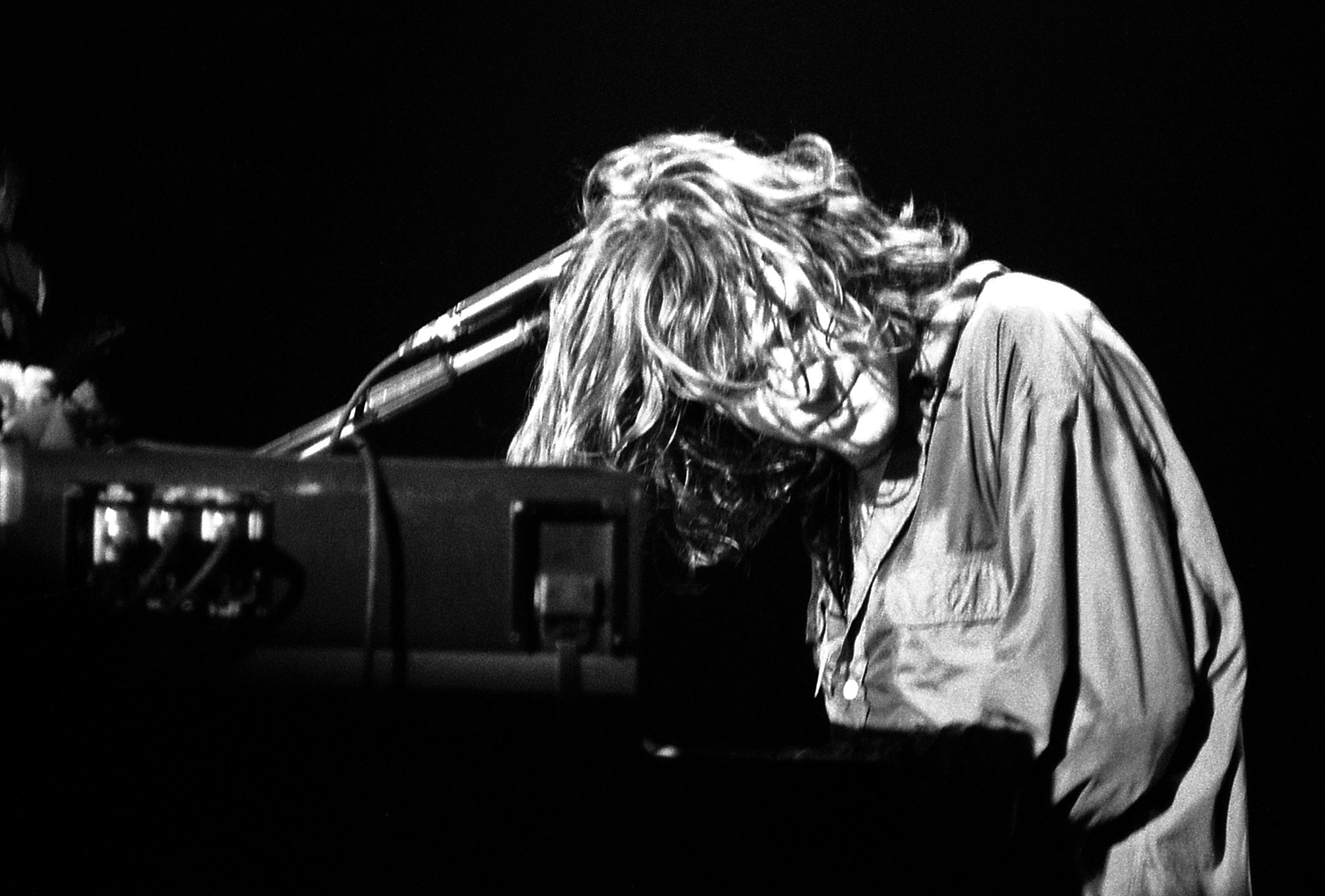
Liam Ó Maonlaí, lead singer of the Hothouse Flowers (pictured in 1990)

The contest took place on 30 April 1988 at 20:00 (IST) with a duration of 2 hours and 50 minutes. Had Cyprus participated as planned, the country was drawn to perform in position number two.

The contest was opened by a video montage highlighting ancient Celtic structures, items and mythology pertaining to prehistoric Ireland, transitioning to footage of modern-day Ireland and Dublin. This was followed by a performance of the previous year's winning entry, "Hold Me Now", by Johnny Logan. The interval act was the Irish rock group Hothouse Flowers, with a music video of their song "Don't Go"; the group's lead singer Liam Ó Maonlaí also appeared on stage before the music video played to explain the meaning behind the song – first in Irish, then in English – while playing piano. The music video, featuring the Hothouse Flowers performing the song in eleven European countries, received funding from the European Economic Community as part of the organisation's goal of advancing European integration. The trophy awarded to the winners was presented at the end of the broadcast by Johnny Logan.

The winner was Switzerland represented by the song "Ne partez pas sans moi", composed by Atilla Şereftuğ, written by Nella Martinetti and performed by Céline Dion. It was Switzerland's second Eurovision win, following its victory at the inaugural edition in 1956. It also remains, as of 2026, the last time that a song in the French language has won. The United Kingdom finished in second place for the eleventh time, while Austria finished in last place for the sixth time, and achieved its second nul points result.

Results of the Eurovision Song Contest 1988
R/O	Country	Artist	Song	Points	Place
1	Iceland	Beathoven	"Sókrates"	20	16
2	Sweden	Tommy Körberg	"Stad i ljus"	52	12
3	Finland	Boulevard	"Nauravat silmät muistetaan"	3	20
4	United Kingdom	Scott Fitzgerald	"Go"	136	2
5	Turkey	MFÖ	"Sufi (Hey Ya Hey)"	37	15
6	Spain	La Década	"La chica que yo quiero (Made in Spain)"	58	11
7	Netherlands	Gerard Joling	"Shangri-La"	70	9
8	Israel	Yardena Arazi	"Ben Adam"	85	7
9	Switzerland	Céline Dion	"Ne partez pas sans moi"	137	1
10	Ireland	Jump the Gun	"Take Him Home"	79	8
11	Germany	Maxi & Chris Garden	"Lied für einen Freund"	48	14
12	Austria	Wilfried	"Lisa Mona Lisa"	0	21
13	Denmark	Hot Eyes	"Ka' du se hva' jeg sa'"	92	3
14	Greece	Afroditi Fryda	"Clown"	10	17
15	Norway	Karoline Krüger	"For vår jord"	88	5
16	Belgium	Reynaert	"Laissez briller le soleil"	5	18
17	Luxembourg	Lara Fabian	"Croire"	90	4
18	Italy	Luca Barbarossa	"Ti scrivo"	52	12
19	France	Gérard Lenorman	"Chanteur de charme"	64	10
20	Portugal	Dora	"Voltarei"	5	18
21	Yugoslavia	Srebrna krila	"Mangup"	87	6

=== Spokespersons ===
Each participating broadcaster appointed a spokesperson, connected to the contest venue via telephone lines and responsible for announcing, in English or French, the votes for its respective country. Known spokespersons at the 1988 contest are listed below.

- Finland – Solveig Herlin
- Iceland – Guðrún Skúladóttir
- Ireland – John Skehan (Note: Confirmed by host Pat Kenny during the broadcast.)
- Norway – Andreas Diesen
- Sweden – Maud Uppling
- United Kingdom – Colin Berry
- Yugoslavia – Miša Molk

== Detailed voting results ==
Jury voting was used to determine the points awarded by all countries. The results were announced in the order of performance, with the spokespersons announcing their country's points in English or French in ascending order. The detailed breakdown of the points awarded by each country is listed in the tables below.

The 1988 contest has become notable for its tense voting sequence right until the final jury announced its points. With three countries left to vote, the United Kingdom had a fifteen-point lead over Switzerland, however, this gap was closed to only five points going into the final jury. When the Yugoslav jury awarded Switzerland 6 points, it appeared that victory was within reach for the UK as the camera cut to a crestfallen Céline Dion in the green room. However, the British entry received no points from Yugoslavia, leading Switzerland to win the contest by one point. It remains one of the closest margins of victory in the contest's history, and the closest result since 1969, when there was a four-way tie for first place. It also marked the second time that the UK came in second place with only one point separating it from the winner, following the 1968 contest.

Detailed voting results of the Eurovision Song Contest 1988
		Total score	Iceland	Sweden	Finland	United Kingdom	Turkey	Spain	Netherlands	Israel	Switzerland	Ireland	Germany	Austria	Denmark	Greece	Norway	Belgium	Luxembourg	Italy	France	Portugal	Yugoslavia
Contestants	Iceland	20		1					4						4					1	2	8	
Contestants	Sweden	52	3			2			8			5			8		**12**	1	3	10			
Contestants	Finland	3								3													
Contestants	United Kingdom	136	1	5	10		**12**	10		10	5	7	10	10	10	6	5	**12**	8	**12**		3	
Contestants	Turkey	37		4		1		5	1	8			8						4		6		
Contestants	Spain	58	2				5			2	6			8	1	8	2	6	6	8			4
Contestants	Netherlands	70				6	6			7	7	2	6			**12**			**12**	5			7
Contestants	Israel	85	6		6	4		6	3		10	1	5	2		3		10	5	3	10	10	1
Contestants	Switzerland	**137**	7	**12**	5	10	10	8	10	4		10	**12**			10	8	4	1	7	1	**12**	6
Contestants	Ireland	79		7	2	3	2	**12**	6		4		7	6	7		7	5			4	5	2
Contestants	Germany	48	8			5	1	3		5		6			6		4					2	8
Contestants	Austria	0																					
Contestants	Denmark	92	10	3	4			1	**12**	6	1	4	4	**12**			10	7			**12**	6	
Contestants	Greece	10					3														7		
Contestants	Norway	88	5	8	7	**12**			7	1		8	1	3	5	7		3		4		7	10
Contestants	Belgium	5																			5		
Contestants	Luxembourg	90	4	10	**12**	7			5		**12**	**12**		1	2	2	6	8		2		4	3
Contestants	Italy	52			8		4	7			8		2	5			3		2		8		5
Contestants	France	64		2	3		8	2	2		3		3	7	3	5	1	2	10			1	**12**
Contestants	Portugal	5						4								1							
Contestants	Yugoslavia	87	**12**	6	1	8	7			**12**	2	3		4	**12**	4			7	6	3		

=== 12 points ===
The below table summarises how the maximum 12 points were awarded from one country to another. The winning country is shown in bold. Denmark, Luxembourg, Switzerland, the United Kingdom and Yugoslavia received the maximum score of 12 points from three of the voting countries, the Netherlands received two sets of 12 points, and France, Ireland, Norway and Sweden each received one maximum score.

Distribution of 12 points awarded at the Eurovision Song Contest 1988
N.	Contestant	Nation(s) giving 12 points
3	Denmark	Austria, France, Netherlands
3	Luxembourg	Finland, Ireland, Switzerland
3	**Switzerland**	Germany, Portugal, Sweden
3	United Kingdom	Belgium, Italy, Turkey
3	Yugoslavia	Denmark, Iceland, Israel
2	Netherlands	Greece, Luxembourg
1	France	Yugoslavia
1	Ireland	Spain
1	Norway	United Kingdom
1	Sweden	Norway

== Broadcasts ==
Each participating broadcaster was required to relay the contest via its networks. Non-participating EBU member broadcasters could also relay the contest as "passive participants". Broadcasters were able to provide commentary, enabling coverage of the contest in their own native language and to relay information about the artists and songs to their viewers, with 33 booths constructed in the contest venue to accommodate commentators on-site in Dublin covering the event. Over 40 television and radio broadcasters were expected to relay the event, with an estimated audience of 600 million viewers. The contest was also reportedly broadcast in the countries of Eastern Europe via Intervision, and in Australia and South Korea.

Known details on the broadcasts in each country, including the specific broadcasting stations and commentators are shown in the tables below.

Broadcasters and commentators in participating countries
Country	Broadcaster	Channel(s)	Commentator(s)	Ref.
Austria	ORF	FS1	Ernst Grissemann	
Belgium	RTBF	RTBF1	Pierre Collard-Bovy	
Belgium	BRT	TV1	Luc Appermont	
Belgium	BRT	BRT 2	Erik Bayens	
Denmark	DR	DR TV, DR P2	Jørgen de Mylius	
Finland	YLE	TV1, 2-verkko	Erkki Pohjanheimo	
France	Antenne 2		Lionel Cassan	
Germany	ARD	Erstes Deutsches Fernsehen	Nicole and Claus-Erich Boetzkes	
Greece	ERT	ET1	Dafni Bokota	
Iceland	RÚV	Sjónvarpið, Rás 1	Hermann Gunnarsson	
Ireland	RTÉ	RTÉ 1	Mike Murphy	
Ireland	RTÉ	RTÉ FM3	Larry Gogan	
Israel	IBA	Israeli Television, Reshet Gimel		
Italy	RAI	Rai Tre	Daniele Piombi	
Luxembourg	CLT	RTL Télévision (Note: Additional broadcast on Canal 21 and RTL-TVI)	Valérie Sarn	
Luxembourg	CLT	RTL plus		
Netherlands	NOS	Nederland 3	Willem van Beusekom	
Norway	NRK	NRK Fjernsynet, NRK P2	John Andreassen	
Portugal	RTP	RTP1		
Spain	TVE	TVE 2	Beatriz Pécker	
Sweden	SVT	TV2	Bengt Grafström	
Sweden	RR	SR P3	Kalle Oldby	
Switzerland	SRG SSR	SRG Sportkette	Bernard Thurnheer	
Switzerland	SRG SSR	SSR Chaîne Sportive	Serge Moisson	
Switzerland	SRG SSR	SSR Canale Sportivo	Giovanni Bertini	
Turkey	TRT	TV1		
United Kingdom	BBC	BBC1	Terry Wogan	
United Kingdom	BBC	BBC Radio 2 (Note: Simulcast on BBC Radio 1 VHF, and BBC Radio Cambridgeshire, BBC Radio Cleveland, BBC Radio Cumbria, BBC Radio Derby, BBC Radio Devon, BBC Radio Newcastle, BBC Radio Oxford, BBC Radio Shropshire, BBC Radio Solent, BBC Radio Stoke, BBC Radio Wales, and BBC Radio WM.)	Ken Bruce	
Yugoslavia	JRT	TV Beograd 1, TV Novi Sad, TV Prishtina, TV Sarajevo 1, TV Zagreb 1	Oliver Mlakar	
Yugoslavia	JRT	TV Ljubljana 1		

Broadcasters and commentators in non-participating countries
Country	Broadcaster	Channel(s)	Commentator(s)	Ref.
Australia	SBS	SBS TV (Note: Deferred broadcast the following day at 19:30 (AEST))		
Bulgaria	BT	BT 1 (Note: Delayed broadcast on 28 May 1988 at 22:15 (EEST))		
Canada	CBC	Radio-Canada (Note: Delayed broadcast in a shortened format on 30 May 1988 at 19:00 (EDT))	Céline Dion and René Angélil	
Cyprus	CyBC	RIK, A Programma		
Czechoslovakia	ČST	II. program (Note: Delayed broadcast in a shortened format on 29 May 1988 at 17:35 (CEST))		
Faroe Islands	SvF			
Greenland	KNR	KNR (Note: Delayed broadcast on 2 May 1988 at 20:45 (WGST))		
Hungary	MTV	MTV2	István Vágó	
Jordan	JRTV	JTV2		
Poland	TP	TP1 (Note: Delayed broadcast on 14 May 1988 at 20:00 (CEST))		
South Korea	KBS	KBS2 (Note: Delayed broadcast in a shortened format on 29 May 1988 at 14:40 (KST))		
Soviet Union	CT USSR	Programme One (Note: Delayed broadcast on 28 May 1988 at 22:10 (MSD)) (Note: Also broadcast deferred via the Orbita satellite broadcasting system in the Soviet Far East)		
Soviet Union	ETV			

== Legacy ==
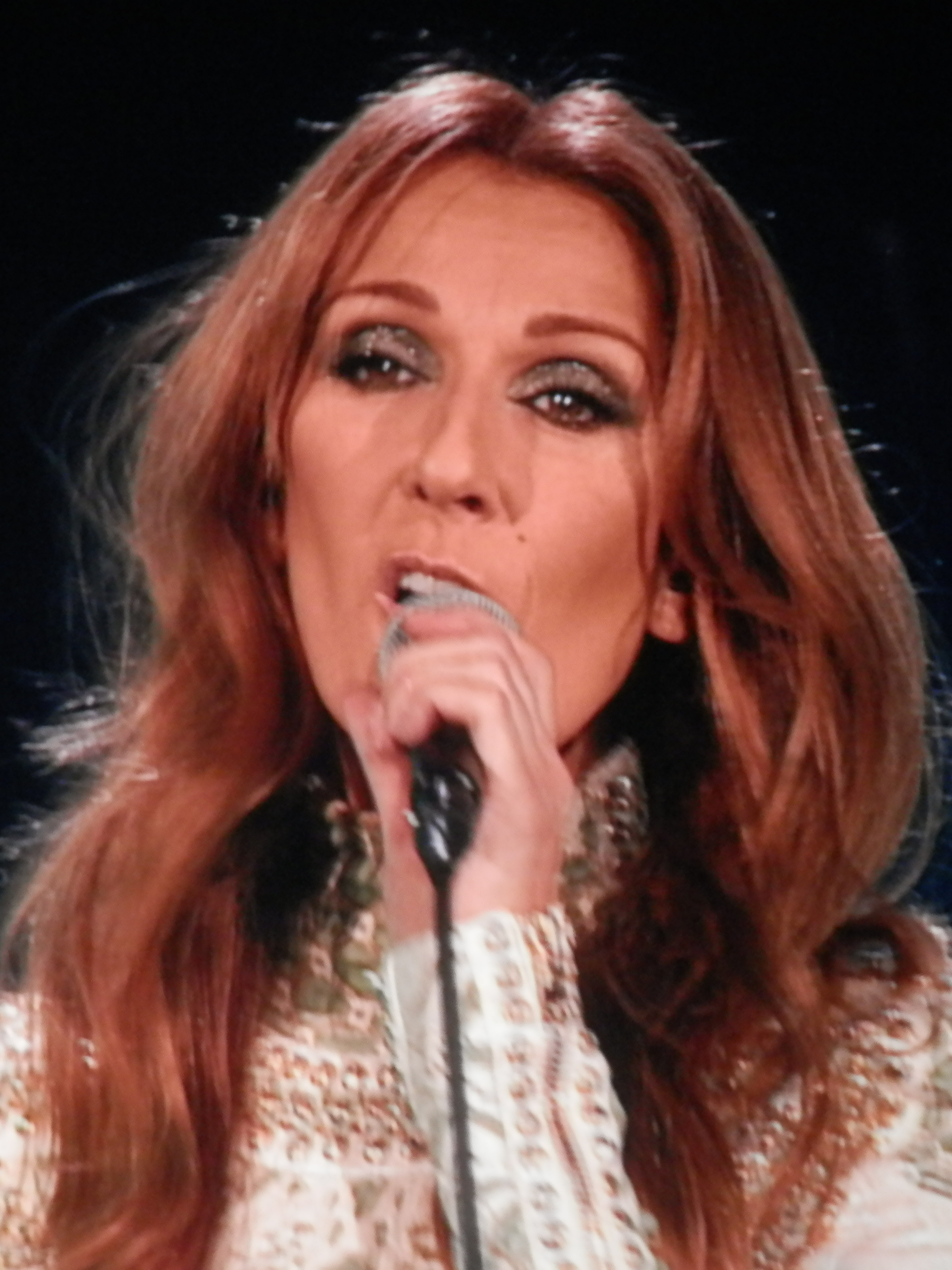
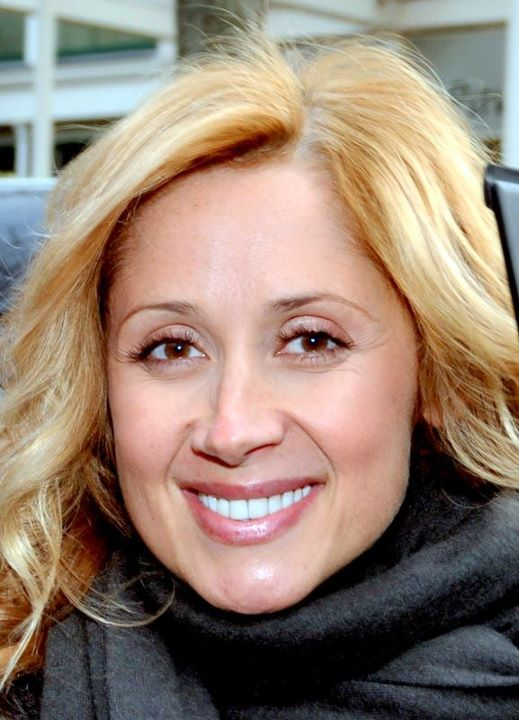
Francophone artists Céline Dion (left; pictured in 2013) and Lara Fabian (right; pictured in 2012) both achieved global success following the contest.

The 1988 contest is considered to be the launchpad for Switzerland's winning artist Céline Dion and Luxembourg's Lara Fabian, contributing to their global notability and success.

Although Dion's winning song "Ne partez pas sans moi" was not a major commercial success in singles charts across Europe, winning the contest provided a sizeable boost to her global platform, and reportedly allowed her manager and future husband René Angélil to successfully negotiate a four-fold budget increase for her first English-language album, Unison. This album sold over four million copies upon its release in 1990 and has since been certified gold in France and the UK, platinum in the United States, and seven-times platinum in Canada. Dion performed the album's lead single, "Where Does My Heart Beat Now", as an opening act at the following year's contest. It became her first global hit, peaking at number four on the Billboard Hot 100 in the US in addition to hitting the top 20 in Norway, Ireland and France. Dion has since become one of the world's best-selling music artists, with more than 200 million total global album sales.

Belgian-born Fabian moved to Quebec in the years following the contest, where she embarked on a career in French-speaking North America, gaining success with her self-titled debut album in 1991 and breaking through further with follow-up album Carpe diem in 1994. English-language success would soon follow, with the release of the album Lara Fabian and her first English-language single "I Will Love Again", which charted within the top 40 on the Billboard Hot 100 and topped the magazine's Dance Club Songs chart, in 2000. With over 20 million album sales worldwide, Fabian is considered the best-selling Belgian-born female artist of all time and among the best-selling Belgian-born artists in general.

"Ne partez pas sans moi" was subsequently nominated in 2005 to compete in Congratulations: 50 Years of the Eurovision Song Contest, a special broadcast organised as a part of the contest's anniversary celebrations to determine the contest's most popular entry of its first 50 year run. One of 14 entries chosen to compete, the song ultimately finished in tenth place.

In the UK, entertainer Bruce Forsyth, whose daughter Julie wrote "Go", nominated Yugoslavia on the TV show Room 101, where celebrities nominate things to be banished from the world. Forsyth said that Yugoslavia needed to give the UK one point in order to win the contest, but they gave them nothing, leading to Dion's victory. Dion later appeared on The National Lottery Live when Forsyth was hosting, during which Forsyth made reference to Dion beating his daughter, but blamed Yugoslavia for the loss.

== Notes and references ==
=== Bibliography ===
- Knox, David Blake (2015). Ireland and the Eurovision: The Winners, the Losers and the Turkey. Stillorgan, Dublin, Ireland: New Island Books. ISBN 978-1-84840-429-8.
- Murtomäki, Asko (2007). Finland 12 points! Suomen Euroviisut (in Finnish). Helsinki, Finland: Teos. ISBN 978-951-851-106-2.
- O'Connor, John Kennedy (2010). The Eurovision Song Contest: The Official History (2nd ed.). London, United Kingdom: Carlton Books. ISBN 978-1-84732-521-1.
- Roxburgh, Gordon (2014). Songs for Europe: The United Kingdom at the Eurovision Song Contest. Vol. Two: The 1970s. Prestatyn, United Kingdom: Telos Publishing. ISBN 978-1-84583-093-9.
- Roxburgh, Gordon (2016). Songs for Europe: The United Kingdom at the Eurovision Song Contest. Vol. Three: The 1980s. Prestatyn, United Kingdom: Telos Publishing. ISBN 978-1-84583-163-9.
- Thorsson, Leif; Verhage, Martin (2006). Melodifestivalen genom tiderna : de svenska uttagningarna och internationella finalerna [Melodifestivalen through the ages: the Swedish selections and international finals] (in Swedish). Stockholm, Sweden: Premium Publishing. ISBN 91-89136-29-2.
- West, Chris (2020). Eurovision! A History of Modern Europe Through the World's Greatest Song Contest (Updated ed.). London, United Kingdom: Melville House UK. ISBN 978-1-911545-55-2.
