= Belgium in the Eurovision Song Contest 1988 =

- Eurovision Song Contest 1988
- Participating broadcaster: Radio-télévision belge de la Communauté française (RTBF)
- Country: Belgium
- Selection process: Finale Nationale du Concours Eurovision de la Chanson 1988
- Selection date: 28 February 1988

Competing entry
- Song: "Laissez briller le soleil"
- Artist: Reynaert
- Songwriters: Joseph Reynaerts; Dany Willem; Philippe Anciaux

Placement
- Final result: 18th, 5 points

Participation chronology

Belgium was represented at the Eurovision Song Contest 1988 with the song "Laissez briller le soleil", written by Joseph Reynaerts, Dany Willem, and Philippe Anciaux, and performed by Reynaert himself. The Belgian participating broadcaster, Walloon Radio-télévision belge de la Communauté française (RTBF), selected its entry through a national final.

== Before Eurovision ==
=== Finale Nationale du Concours Eurovision de la Chanson 1988 ===
Wallon broadcaster Radio-télévision belge de la Communauté française (RTBF) had the turn to participate in the Eurovision Song Contest 1988 representing Belgium. It held the national final on 28 February 1988 at 20:05 CET in its studios in Brussels, hosted by Patrick Duhamel. The winner was chosen by an expert jury and a public jury, consisting of 500 selected television viewers. The full results of the voting were not made public, and only the winning song was announced.

Final – 28 February 1988
R/O	Artist	Song	Songwriter(s)	Result
1	Cap Segal	"Les couleurs de tes nuits"	Nicole Maquinay; Guy Cabay	—N/a
2	Gil Cassan	"Fragile"	Jean-Marie Renuart	—N/a
3	Yannick Darkman and Samantha Gilles	"Exister pour aimer"	Claire Van Gheluwe; Toni Kolenberg; Fred Beekmans	—N/a
4	Nathalie D.	"S'évader"	Richard Drachman	—N/a
5	Marianne Eden and Nico Zangardi	"L'oeil médiatique"	Nico Zangardi; R. Festraets	—N/a
6	Frank Michael and Martine Laurent	"Mélodie"	Jonet; Frank Michael	—N/a
7	Chantal Nicaise	"On a..."	Chantal Nicaise	—N/a
8	Gianni Polizzi	"Betty Blue"	Pierre Lebattant; Gianni Polizzi; T. Patt	—N/a
9	Reynaert	"Laissez briller le soleil"	Dany Willem; Joseph Reynaerts; Philippe Anciaux	1
10	Frédéric Ruyman	"Puisque l'amour ne suffit pas"	Frédéric Ruyman	—N/a
11	Fabienne Sevrin	"Laissez-nous croire"	Fabienne Sevrin; R. Canteli; P. Julien	—N/a
12	Toxic	"Perdu dans l'infini"	Bruno Emsens; Bernard Meeus	—N/a

== At Eurovision ==
The contest was broadcast on RTBF1 (with commentary by Pierre Collard-Bovy) and TV1 (with commentary by Luc Appermont). It was also broadcast on radio station BRT 2.

On the night of the final Reynaert performed 16th in the running order, following Norway and preceding Luxembourg. At the close of the voting "Laissez briller le soleil" had received 5 points, placing Belgium joint 18th (with Portugal) of the 21 entries. The Belgian jury awarded its 12 points to the United Kingdom.

=== Voting ===
Points awarded to Belgium
Score	Country
12 points	
10 points	
8 points	
7 points	
6 points	
5 points	France
4 points	
3 points	
2 points	
1 point	

Points awarded by Belgium
Score	Country
12 points	United Kingdom
10 points	Israel
8 points	Luxembourg
7 points	Denmark
6 points	Spain
5 points	Ireland
4 points	Switzerland
3 points	Norway
2 points	France
1 point	Sweden
