= La Década Prodigiosa =

Spanish music group

- Origin: Spain
- Years active: 1985–present
- Members: Javier Enzo; Lorena René; RobertoVelasco; Rachel Lamb
- Past members: Javier de Juan; Manel Santisteban; Manuel Aguilar; Manolo Rodríguez; Cecilia Blanco; Ana Nery; Carmelo Martínez; José Subiza; Paco Morales; Mikel Herzog; Paloma Blanco; Carlos Santamaría

La Década Prodigiosa (Spanish: [la ˈðekaða pɾoðiˈxjosa]; "The Prodigious Decade"), also known as just La Década, is a Spanish music group formed in the mid-eighties that participated in the Eurovision Song Contest 1988.

La Década Prodigiosa came up in 1985 as a project directed by Javier de Juan (drums), Manel Santisteban (piano) and Manuel Aguilar (bass) to produce an album of medleys of popular Spanish songs from the sixties. Several session singers collaborated in this first album, Los Años 60, Vol. I. Due to the success of the album, a band of eight members was formed in 1986 for the second album (Los Años 60, Vol. II): Manolo Rodríguez, Cecilia Blanco, Ana Nery, Carmelo Martínez and Jose Subiza joined the three creators. The band toured Spain with their own show.

In 1988, La Década was internally chosen by broadcaster Televisión Española to represent Spain at the 33rd Eurovision Song Contest in Dublin with one of their first original songs, "La chica que yo quiero (Made in Spain)". As only six people were allowed on stage by EBU rules, Javier de Juan directed the orchestra and Manolo Rodríguez stayed backstage. La Década finished eleventh out of 21 entries.

Since then, the group has survived many replacements of members, even though in the mid-nineties their popularity began to decline. The artists that have been part of the several lineups of the groups include Paco Morales (1986–1987, 1991–1994), Mikel Herzog (1989–1991), Paloma Blanco (1991–1997) or Carlos Santamaria (1991–1998). As of 2015, the group consists of Javier Enzo, Keisy, Jesús Lara and Patrizia Navarro.

The group participated at the Benidorm Song Festival 1996 with the song "Las ganas de vivir" and got the third prize. In 2001 they achieved the second place, named Hi Priority for the occasion, in the Spanish preselection for the Eurovision Song Contest with the song "A nadie como a ti", and they participated at the Benidorm Song Festival as Karma with the same song. In 2005 and 2007 they tried to represent Spain at Eurovision again, and in 2006 they finally won the Benidorm Song Festival with the song "A ti".

== Discography (albums) ==
- Los Años 60, Vol. I (1985)
- Los Años 60, Vol. II (1986)
- Los Años 70 (1987)
- Los 80, Vol I. (1988)
- Los 80, Vol II. (1989)
- Lo mejor en vivo de los 60, 70 y 80 (1990)
- Licencia para bailar (1991)
- La Década (1993)
- Baila con La Década (1994)
- Disneymania (1995)
- Las Ganas de Vivir (1997)
- Lo Mejor de La Década Prodigiosa (1999)
- Seguimos de fiesta con los 80 y 90 (2002)
- Una década latina (2003)
- Los éxitos internacionales de los 80's (2004)
- Technostalgia (2006)
- Cien Mil Kilómetros (2009)
- Spanish Dance (2010)
- Made in Spain, el Musical de tu vida (2012)
- Eres tú (2014)
- 30 años contigo (2015)

Awards and achievements
Preceded by Patricia Kraus with "No estás solo"	Spain in the Eurovision Song Contest; 1988	Succeeded by Nina with "Nacida para amar"
