= Denmark in the Eurovision Song Contest 1988 =

- Eurovision Song Contest 1988
- Participating broadcaster: Danmarks Radio (DR)
- Country: Denmark
- Selection process: Dansk Melodi Grand Prix 1988
- Selection date: 27 February 1988

Competing entry
- Song: "Ka' du se hva' jeg sa'?"
- Artist: Hot Eyes
- Songwriters: Søren Bundgaard; Keld Heick

Placement
- Final result: 3rd, 92 points

Participation chronology

Denmark was represented at the Eurovision Song Contest 1988 with the song "Ka' du se hva' jeg sa'?", composed by Søren Bundgaard, with lyrics by Keld Heick, and performed by Hot Eyes. The Danish participating broadcaster, Danmarks Radio (DR), organised the Dansk Melodi Grand Prix 1988 in order to select its entry for the contest. This was the last of three Eurovision appearances for the duo. Their Eurovision performance is noted for the fact that Kirsten was heavily and very visibly pregnant at the time.

== Before Eurovision ==
=== Dansk Melodi Grand Prix 1988 ===
Danmarks Radio (DR) held the Dansk Melodi Grand Prix 1988 on 27 February at 19:45 (CEST), hosted by Jørgen de Mylius at TV-Byen in Gladsaxe. The national final was also broadcast in Greenland's KNR-TV on a delayed broadcast in 6 March. Ten songs took part with the winner being decided by voting from five regional juries. Firstly the five lowest-placed songs were eliminated without full voting being revealed, then the remaining five were voted on again to give the winner.

First Round – 27 February 1988
R/O	Artist	Song	Songwriter(s)	Result
1	Anne Mette and Hip Hop	"Du kan gå med"	Turid N. Christensen; Ole Brockmann	—N/a
2	Paul Mathiasen	"Til dig"	Niels Bystrup; Esther Traneberg	—N/a
3	Snapshot	"Tid til lidt kærlighed"	James Price; Adam Price	Qualified
4	Stig Rossen	"Vi danser rock og rul"	Jørn Hansen; Helge Engelbrecht	Qualified
5	Anne Marie Busk	"9½ minut"	Tommy Hansen; Jens Folmer Jepsen	—N/a
6	Lulu	"Johnny B. Goode"	Knud Thormod	Qualified
7	Henriette Lykke	"Det' okay"	Per Meilstrup; Keld Heick	Qualified
8	Anne Karin	"Gi' naturen chancen"	Mikael Andersen; Leif Maibom	—N/a
9	Kirsten and Søren	"Ka' du se hva' jeg sa'?"	Søren Bundgaard; Keld Heick	Qualified
10	Sirius	"Ene"	Leif Svorin	—N/a

Second Round – 27 February 1988
R/O	Artist	Song	Regional Juries					Total	Place
R/O	Artist	Song	North and West Jutland	Zealand and Islands	East and South Jutland	Greater Copenhagen	Funen	Total	Place
1	Lulu	"Johnny B. Goode"	1	2	6	2	2	13	5
2	Kirsten and Søren	"Ka' du se hva' jeg sa'?"	8	8	1	6	6	29	1
3	Snapshot	"Tid til lidt kærlighed"	4	4	8	8	1	25	2
4	Stig Rossen	"Vi danser rock og rul"	2	1	2	4	8	17	4
5	Henriette Lykke	"Det' okay"	6	6	4	1	4	21	3

== At Eurovision ==
On the night of the final Hot Eyes performed 13th in the running order, following Austria and preceding Greece. At the close of voting "Ka' du se hva' jeg sa'?" had received 92 points, placing Denmark third of the 21 entries, the country's best placing since the victory of Grethe and Jørgen Ingmann in 1963. The Danish jury awarded its 12 points to Yugoslavia.

The contest was broadcast on DR TV and on radio station DR P2, with commentary by Jørgen de Mylius.

=== Voting ===
Points awarded to Denmark
Score	Country
12 points	Austria; France; Netherlands
10 points	Iceland; Norway
8 points	
7 points	Belgium
6 points	Israel; Portugal
5 points	
4 points	Finland; Germany; Ireland
3 points	Sweden
2 points	
1 point	Spain; Switzerland

Points awarded by Denmark
Score	Country
12 points	Yugoslavia
10 points	United Kingdom
8 points	Sweden
7 points	Ireland
6 points	Germany
5 points	Norway
4 points	Iceland
3 points	France
2 points	Luxembourg
1 point	Spain
