= Netherlands in the Eurovision Song Contest 1988 =

- Eurovision Song Contest 1988
- Participating broadcaster: Nederlandse Omroep Stichting (NOS)
- Country: Netherlands
- Selection process: Artist: Internal selection Song: Nationaal Songfestival '88
- Selection date: 23 March 1988

Competing entry
- Song: "Shangri-La"
- Artist: Gerard Joling
- Songwriter: Peter de Wijn

Placement
- Final result: 9th, 70 points

Participation chronology

The Netherlands was represented at the Eurovision Song Contest 1988 with the song "Shangri-La", written by Peter de Wijn, and performed by Gerard Joling. The Dutch participating broadcaster, Nederlandse Omroep Stichting (NOS), selected its entry through a national final, after having previously selected the performer internally.

== Before Eurovision ==
=== Nationaal Songfestival '88 ===
Nederlandse Omroep Stichting (NOS) held the national final on 23 March 1988 at 20:10 CEST in the Congresgebouw in The Hague, hosted by Astrid Joosten. The national final was broadcast on Nederland 2. All songs were performed by Gerard Joling, who was internally selected by the broadcaster to sing for the Netherlands, with the winning song being chosen by a 55-member jury who gave each song a mark out of 6.

Final – 23 March 1988
R/O	Song	Points	Place
1	"Heel verliefd"	222	2
2	"Shangri-La"	283	1
3	"Happy End in Hollywood"	213	4
4	"December in April"	165	5
5	"Doolang doolang"	156	6
6	"Mijn droom"	219	3

== At Eurovision ==
The contest was broadcast on Nederland 3 (with commentary by Willem van Beusekom). Joling performed 7th on the night of the contest, following Spain and preceding Israel. His song received 70 points, placing 9th of 22 competing countries.

The Dutch conductor at the contest was Harry van Hoof.

Among the members of the Dutch jury were Hans van den Berg and Bert Tuk.

=== Voting ===
Points awarded to the Netherlands
Score	Country
12 points	Greece; Luxembourg
10 points	
8 points	
7 points	Israel; Switzerland; Yugoslavia
6 points	Germany; Turkey; United Kingdom
5 points	Italy
4 points	
3 points	
2 points	Ireland
1 point	

Points awarded by the Netherlands
Score	Country
12 points	Denmark
10 points	Switzerland
8 points	Sweden
7 points	Norway
6 points	Ireland
5 points	Luxembourg
4 points	Iceland
3 points	Israel
2 points	France
1 point	Turkey
