= Wilfried (singer) =

Austrian singer-songwriter and actor

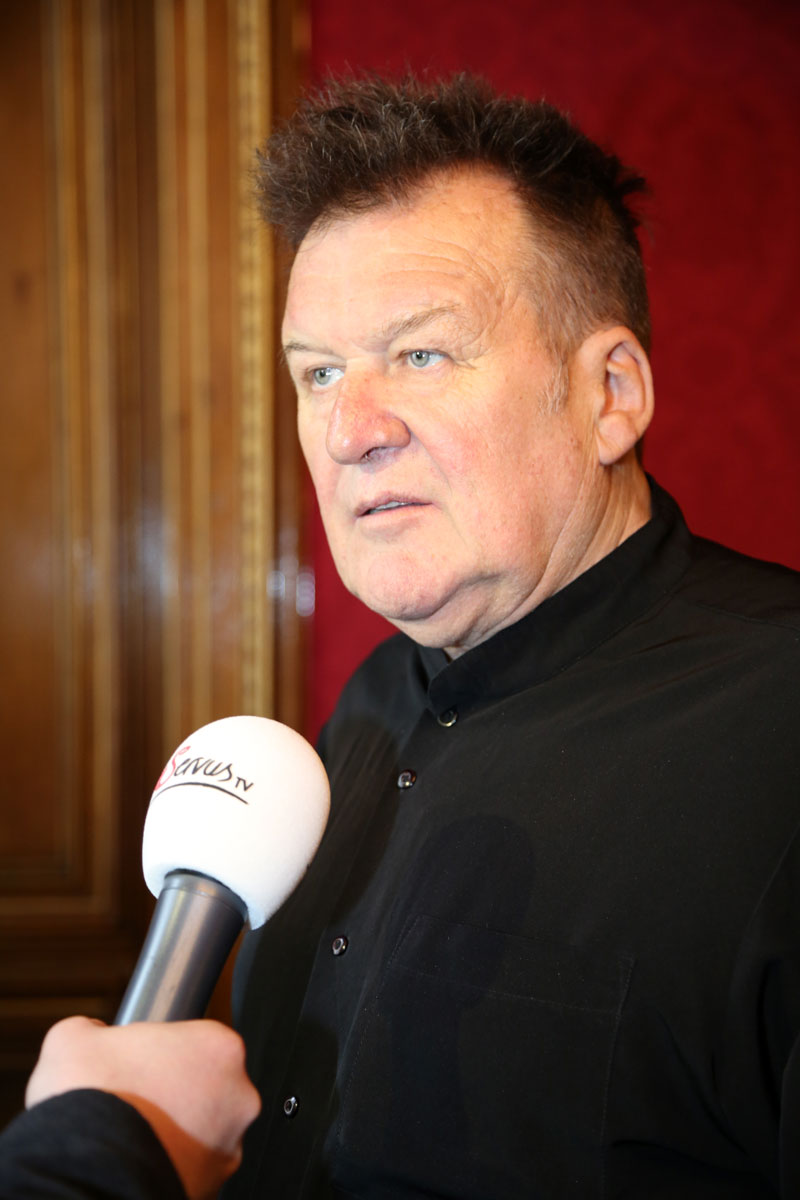

Background information
- Born: Wilfried Scheutz; 24 June 1950; Bad Goisern am Hallstättersee, Austria
- Died: 16 July 2017 (aged 67) Lilienfeld, Austria
- Genres: Pop, soft rock
- Occupations: Vocals, songwriter, actor
- Years active: 1973–2017

Wilfried (born Wilfried Scheutz; 24 June 1950 – 16 July 2017) was an Austrian singer-songwriter and actor.

== Life and career ==
Scheutz was born in Bad Goisern am Hallstättersee, Austria. He was known for representing Austria in the Eurovision Song Contest 1988 with his song "Lisa Mona Lisa". His acting career was known for his role in Hilde, das Dienstmädchen (1986). From 1978 to 1979 he was a singer for the Austrian band Erste Allgemeine Verunsicherung.

== Death ==
Wilfried died in Lilienfeld, Austria on 16 July 2017 from complications of cancer at the age of 67.

== Discography ==
Albums

- 1974: The Crazy Baby
- 1979: Nights In The City
- 1980: Make Up
- 1981: Ganz Normal
- 1982: Wunschkonzert
- 1983: Ja
- 1984: Sehr sehr arg
- 1985: Ganz oder gar net
- 1986: Nachts in der City - Live
- 1987: Leicht
- 1988: Feuer auf dem Dach
- 1990: Berg und Tal
- 1990: Der weiche Kern
- 1992: Gemma!
- 1994: Katerfrühstück feat. Wilfried
- 2012: Tralalala
- 2013: Wieder da! Das Live Album
- 2017: Gut Lack

Singles

- 1973: Mary, Oh Mary
- 1973: Ziwui, Ziwui
- 1973: Woodpecker's Music
- 1974: `s Katherl
- 1974: Go, Go, Go
- 1975: Country Blues
- 1976: Neonliacht Maria
- 1976: Dobermann
- 1976: Teifi eini - Tieifi aussi
- 1977: Tanz, Franz!
- 1978: Hey Big Brother
- 1978: Nights In The City
- 1978: Johnny's Discothek
- 1979: In The Middle Of The Night
- 1980: I've Got To Have A Reggae On My LP
- 1980: Telephone Terror
- 1980: I'm In
- 1981: Highdelbeeren
- 1981: Buhuhuhu hu
- 1981: Ich hab' zuviel Power
- 1981: Keiner liebt dich
- 1982: Orange
- 1983: Lass mi bei dir sein
- 1983: Mir san alle froh (Alles leiwand)
- 1984: I Like Donnerstag
- 1984: Weit, so weit
- 1984: Wudu
- 1985: Südwind
- 1985: Masqumje
- 1985: Nix hat Nagel
- 1986: Nachts in der City
- 1986: Morgenstern
- 1987: Leicht
- 1987: Ikarus
- 1988: Lisa Mona Lisa
- 1988: Gratuliere Österreich
- 1988: Nur noch mit dir
- 1989: Musique, mon amour
- 1990: Ebensee
- 1990: Sag warum

Preceded by Gary Lux with "Nur noch Gefühl"	Austria in the Eurovision Song Contest; 1988	Succeeded by Thomas Forstner with "Nur ein Lied"
