= Sweden in the Eurovision Song Contest 1988 =

- Eurovision Song Contest 1988
- Participating broadcaster: Sveriges Television (SVT)
- Country: Sweden
- Selection process: Melodifestivalen 1988
- Selection date: 27 February 1988

Competing entry
- Song: "Stad i ljus"
- Artist: Tommy Körberg
- Songwriter: Py Bäckman

Placement
- Final result: 12th, 52 points

Participation chronology

Sweden was represented at the Eurovision Song Contest 1988 with the song "Stad i ljus", written by Py Bäckman, and performed by Tommy Körberg. The Swedish participating broadcaster, Sveriges Television (SVT), selected its entry through Melodifestivalen 1988. Körberg had already represented Sweden in 1969.

== Before Eurovision ==
=== Melodifestivalen 1988 ===
Melodifestivalen 1988 was the selection for the 28th song to represent Sweden at the Eurovision Song Contest. It was the 27th time that this system of picking a song had been used. 1,100 songs were submitted to Sveriges Television (SVT) for the competition. The final was held in the Malmö Stadsteater in Malmö on 27 February 1988, presented by Bengt Grafström and was broadcast on TV2 and was not broadcast on radio. The show was watched by 4,464,000 people.

| R/O | Artist | Song | Songwriter(s) | Place |
|---|---|---|---|---|
| 1 | Karin Ljung and Michael Nannini | "Säg är det sant?" | Karin Ljung; Michael Nannini | —N/a |
| 2 | Uffe Persson | "Nästa weekend" | Ingela 'Pling' Forsman; Lasse Holm | —N/a |
| 3 | All of a Sudden | "Dansa med vindarna" | Paul Kvanta; Fredrik Möller | Qualified |
| 4 | Billy Gezon | "Måndag i mitt liv" | Ulf Nordquist | —N/a |
| 5 | Haakon Pedersen | "Bang, en explosion" | Monica Forsberg; Bertil Engh | Qualified |
| 6 | Annica Burman | "I en ding ding värld" | Bruno Glenmark; Lars Andersson | Qualified |
| 7 | Sten Nilsson and Nilsonettes | "Kärlek är..." | Monica Forsberg; Ebbe Nilsson; Sten Nilsson; Vidar Alsterberg | —N/a |
| 8 | Lena Philipsson | "Om igen" | Ingela 'Pling' Forsman; Bobby Ljunggren; Håkan Almqvist | Qualified |
| 9 | Siw Malmkvist | "Det är kärlek" | Susanne Wigforss; Jonas Warnerbring | —N/a |
| 10 | Paul Rein | "Bara du och jag" | Paul Rein | —N/a |
| 11 | Tommy Körberg | "Stad i ljus" | Py Bäckman | Qualified |
| 12 | Lotta Engberg and Triple & Touch | "100%" | Monica Forsberg; Torgny Söderberg | Qualified |

| Artist | Song | Points | Place |
|---|---|---|---|
| All of a Sudden | "Dansa med vindarna" | 26 | 5 |
| Haakon Pedersen | "Bang, en explosion" | 33 | 4 |
| Annica Burman | "I en ding ding värld" | 19 | 6 |
| Lena Philipsson | "Om igen" | 55 | 2 |
| Tommy Körberg | "Stad i ljus" | 84 | 1 |
| Lotta Engberg and Triple & Touch | "100%" | 47 | 3 |

Detailed Voting Result
| Song | Luleå | Örebro | Karlstad | Umeå | Norrköping | Falun | Växjö | Gothenburg | Sundsvall | Stockholm | Malmö | Total |
|---|---|---|---|---|---|---|---|---|---|---|---|---|
| "Dansa med vindarna" | 2 | 4 | 3 | 1 | 1 | 4 | 1 | 2 | 2 | 4 | 2 | 26 |
| "Bang, en explosion" | 3 | 3 | 2 | 2 | 6 | 2 | 4 | 3 | 3 | 2 | 3 | 33 |
| "I en ding ding värld" | 1 | 1 | 1 | 4 | 3 | 1 | 2 | 1 | 1 | 3 | 1 | 19 |
| "Om igen" | 6 | 6 | 6 | 6 | 4 | 3 | 6 | 4 | 4 | 6 | 4 | 55 |
| "Stad i ljus" | 8 | 8 | 8 | 8 | 8 | 8 | 8 | 6 | 6 | 8 | 8 | 84 |
| "100%" | 4 | 2 | 4 | 3 | 2 | 6 | 3 | 8 | 8 | 1 | 6 | 47 |

== At Eurovision ==
Sweden performed second at the contest and received a total of 52 points and finished 12th.

=== Voting ===
Points awarded to Sweden
| Score | Country |
|---|---|
| 12 points | Norway |
| 10 points | Italy |
| 8 points | Denmark; Netherlands |
| 7 points | |
| 6 points | |
| 5 points | Ireland |
| 4 points | |
| 3 points | Iceland; Luxembourg |
| 2 points | United Kingdom |
| 1 point | Belgium |

Points awarded by Sweden
| Score | Country |
|---|---|
| 12 points | Switzerland |
| 10 points | Luxembourg |
| 8 points | Norway |
| 7 points | Ireland |
| 6 points | Yugoslavia |
| 5 points | United Kingdom |
| 4 points | Turkey |
| 3 points | Denmark |
| 2 points | France |
| 1 point | Iceland |
