= MFÖ =

Turkish pop and rock band

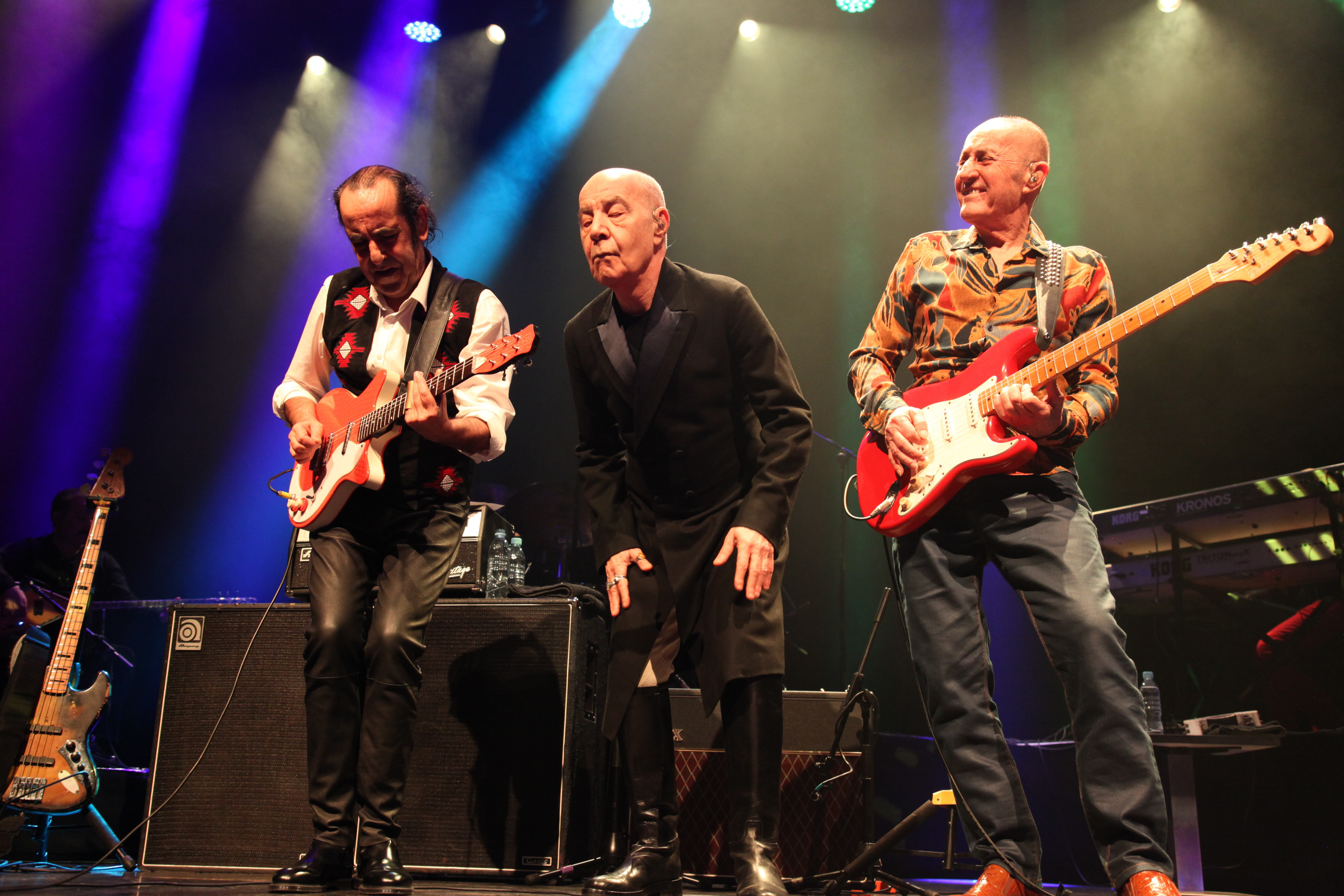
- MFÖ in 2018

Background information
- Also known as: Mazhar Fuat Özkan
- Origin: Turkey
- Genres: Sufi music, Anatolian Rock, Funk rock, Pop music
- Years active: 1980–2023
- Labels: Balet Plak, MMY, Raks Müzik, DMC
- Past members: Mazhar Alanson; Fuat Güner; Özkan Uğur

Mazhar Fuat Özkan (MFÖ) was a Turkish pop and rock band consisted of members Mazhar Alanson, Fuat Güner, and Özkan Uğur. While many of their songs poke fun at common Turkish types ("Ali Desidero", "Piskopatım") or satirise prejudice and corruption ("Deli Deli", "Rüşvet"), others are more spiritual in nature, showing their interest in Sufism ("Sufi", "Ateş-i Aşka").

In 1965, Mazhar Alanson and Fuat Güner first met at a record shop when Alanson saw Güner with a Beatles record in his hand and offered then a stranger Güner to listen the record together. Alanson and Güner would then start to work together and play in the Turkish band, Kaygısızlar, which includes other well known Turkish musicians like Ali Serdar, Semih Oksay, Fikret Kızılok, and Barış Manço. Having also played with Kaygısızlar, Özkan Uğur would start working with other musicians like Erkin Koray, Ersen ve Dadaşlar, and Kurtalan Ekspres after Kaygisizlar separated in 1971.

The same year, in 1971, Mazhar Alanson and Fuat Güner recorded the only album of Mazhar-Fuat. The title of the LP is Türküz Türkü Çağırırız. Following this LP's commercial failure, in 1976, Alanson and Güner formed the band, İpucu Beşlisi, with Özkan Uğur, Ayhan Sicimoğlu, and Galip Boransu, which would separate in 1978.

In 1984, MFÖ would release their first LP Ele Güne Karşı Yapayalnız which turned out to be a big hit. Though, it is accepted MFÖ is officially established in 1971 when Özkan Uğur first played with Alanson and Güner.

On July 8 2023, member of the band Özkan Uğur died due to a relapse of the lymphoma cancer he had previously survived.

== Reputation ==
The trio represented Turkey twice in the Eurovision Song Contest; in 1985 at Gothenburg, Sweden they ranked 14th with Didai Didai Dai, and in 1988 at Dublin, Ireland, performing the song Sufi to finish in 15th place.

Famous Turkish musicians, such as Sertab Erener, Feridun Düzağaç, Sezen Aksu, Gülben Ergen, Gripin, and Hümeyra played MFÖ song covers in their albums and concerts.

Peter Murphy translated MFÖ song "Buselik Makamına" as "Big Love of a Tiny Fool" in English and included it on a studio album and a concert album.

MFÖ has been involved in many aid campaigns. They have participated in charity events especially on street animals, education, spinal cord paralysis.

== Discography ==
=== Studio albums ===
- Ele Güne Karşı Yapayalnız (1984)
- Peki Peki Anladık (1985)
- Vak the Rock (1986)
- No Problem (1987)
- Geldiler (1990)
- Agannaga Rüşvet (1992)
- Dönmem Yolumdan (1992)
- M.V.A.B. (1995)
- AGU (2006)
- Ve MFÖ (2011)
- Kendi Kendine (2017)

=== 45s and singles ===
- Aşık Oldum (I Fell in Love) / Didai Didai Dai (1985)
- Sufi (1988)
- MFÖ (2003)
- Sude (with ER-SEEn) (2019)
- Küsme Bana (2024)

=== Compilation albums ===
- The Best of MFÖ (1989)
- Collection (2003)
- MFÖ Box Set (2013)
- MFÖ En İyiler Akustik, Vol. 1 (2025)

=== Concert albums ===
- MFÖ Senfonik Konser (2007)

Awards and achievements
Preceded by Beş Yıl Önce, On Yıl Sonra with "Halay"	Turkey in the Eurovision Song Contest; 1985	Succeeded by Klips ve Onlar with "Halley"
Preceded by Seyyal Taner & Lokomotif with "Şarkım Sevgi Üstüne"	Turkey in the Eurovision Song Contest; 1988	Succeeded by Pan with "Bana Bana"
