= United Kingdom in the Eurovision Song Contest 1988 =

- Eurovision Song Contest 1988
- Participating broadcaster: British Broadcasting Corporation (BBC)
- Country: United Kingdom
- Selection process: A Song for Europe 1988
- Selection date: 25 March 1988

Competing entry
- Song: "Go"
- Artist: Scott Fitzgerald
- Songwriter: Julie Forsyth

Placement
- Final result: 2nd, 136 points

Participation chronology

The United Kingdom was represented at the Eurovision Song Contest 1988 with the song "Go", written by former Guys 'n' Dolls member Julie Forsyth, and performed by Scott Fitzgerald. The British participating broadcaster, the British Broadcasting Corporation (BBC), selected its entry through a national final.

== Before Eurovision ==
=== A Song for Europe 1988 ===
==== Submissions and selection ====
A total of 182 songs were submitted and at no time during the judging phase were the names of either the composers, authors or publishers divulged.

On the first listening phase, seven sessions at 26 songs per session were heard. Every song entered was played for 150 seconds each and voted upon. Eight judges consisting of music publishers' professional staff and members of the record buying public represented by staff of PRS and MCPS. When adding the votes, the MPA office checked whether any member of the panel had any interest in the songs and if found that an interest existed, that member's vote was replaced by an average mark. The twelve songs from each session with the highest points were put forward to the Second Listening.

The Second Listening consisted of four sessions with 21 songs per session. All songs reaching this stage were mixed and re-numbered so that they were not played in the same order as first listening. Songs were then played again for 150 seconds each and voted upon. Eight judges consisting of similar representatives as the first session but individuals called at different times so that they did not appear with the same people as previous voting. When adding these votes, the MPA office checked whether any member of the panel had any interest in the songs and if found that an interest existed, that member's vote was replaced by an average mark. Eleven songs from each session with the highest points went forward to Third Listening.

With the third listening, this consisted of one session divided into four sections at 11 songs per section, making a total of 44 songs. All songs reaching this stage were again mixed and re-numbered so that they were not played in the same order as previous listenings. The songs were played for two minutes each and voted upon. Fifteen judges consisting of similar representatives as previous sessions but also invited were special guests which included successful songwriters and record producers. No member serving on this panel had any interest in any of the songs. Top 3 from each session automatically put through to the final 20. Bottom 4 from each section were eliminated. Middle 4 from each session put forward for Fourth listening.

On the Fourth Listening was one session of 16 songs. All songs reaching this stage were again mixed and re-numbered so that they were not played in the same order as previous hearings. Songs were played for 2 minutes each and voted upon. Continuation of third session and therefore the same judges were in attendance. The 8 songs with the highest score went forward to Fifth and final listening.

The Fifth Listening was consisted of one session of 20 songs to be reduced to 8 songs for the A Song for Europe broadcast. The listening was held at a meeting at the BBC Television Centre under the auspices of James Moir, Head of Variety. Judges consisting of Radio 2 and Television producers, representatives of the Music Publishers Association (MPA), British Phonographic Industry and British Academy of Songwriters Composers and Authors.

The final 8 competing entries were previewed on both Wogan and on BBC Radio 2.

==== Format ====
The 1987 contest was something of an experiment when compared to other contests of the era, with studio set was much larger, 10 songs were used instead of 8, and the songs were picked by the Music Publisher's Association, and the record industry, in order to have a selection of songs that were more contemporary pop, instead of just songs that could win the Eurovision Song Contest. All of this changed in 1988 as the 8 song format returned, the songs were screened by just the MPA, and as such the songs were less contemporary than in the previous contest. Also gone was the regional jury voting to decide the winner.

For the first time since 1975, the public voted on the songs, although this time it was by telephone voting instead of postcards. Also introduced was a celebrity panel, to comment on the songs. They had no role in the selection of the winner, merely to pass comment. The panel were Mike Batt who discussed songs 2 and 6, Bruce Welch who had been runner-up in the contest with The Shadows talked about songs 4 and 8, Gloria Hunniford who passed comment on songs 3 and 7 and George Martin who talked about songs 1 and 5.

Additionally for the first time, the phone numbers to call appeared on screen and prior to the end of part one, a reprise of all the competing songs was played. A total of 337,557 telephone votes were cast.

==== Final ====
The BBC held the final on 25 March 1988 at Studio 1 of the BBC Television Centre in London. It was hosted by Terry Wogan. The theme music and title sequence were the same the one used in the previous year, a revamped Te Deum. The BBC Concert Orchestra under the direction of Ronnie Hazlehurst as conductor accompanied all the songs, but despite performing live, the orchestra were off-screen, behind the set. The contest was broadcast on Radio 2 and BBC1.

The winner was chosen by televoting, which was "Go" performed by Scott Fitzgerald.

A Song for Europe 1988 – 25 March 1988
R/O	Artist	Song	Songwriter(s)	Televotes	Place
1	Catwalk	"Till the Night"	Pete Bellotte; Dave Cooke	22,358	7
2	Camino	"High Windows"	Duncan Browne; Sebastian Graham Jones	41,528	3
3	Zoe Nicholas	"Just a Memory"	Zoe Nicholas; Ray Monk	27,783	6
4	FNAC	"Make Your Dreams Come True"	Jim Cozens	28,946	5
5	Klass	"One More Chance"	James Oliver	19,504	8
6	Clinging to the Wreckage	"Heart to Heart"	Carol Grimes; Maclek Hrybowicz	30,382	4
7	Two-Ché	"This is the Kiss"	Mike Berry; Mel Simpson	73,785	2
8	Scott Fitzgerald	"Go"	Julie Forsyth	93,271	1

== At Eurovision ==
The contest was staged at the RDS Simmonscourt Pavilion in Dublin on 30 April. 21 nations took part and the UK performed in 4th position, following Finland and preceding Turkey. The UK finished in second place with 136 points, one point behind the winning country Switzerland.

BBC 1 broadcast the final on television, with commentary provided by Terry Wogan. Ray Moore had been scheduled to provide the radio commentary for BBC Radio 2, but Moore was undergoing treatment for cancer at the time, so Ken Bruce fulfilled the commitments. This was Bruce's first involvement with presenting the Eurovision for radio. Bruce would go on to do the radio commentary until 2022. The BBC appointed Colin Berry as its spokesperson to announce the British jury votes.

The members of the UK jury included Nicola Chapman, Terry Clarke, Alfred Collet, Geoff Dennis, James Douglas, Alison Fox, Mike Goss, Carol Holroyd, Muir Johnson, Karen Marsden, Mavis Masters, Molly Roberts, Andrew Sidell, Renate Smith, Paul Tunnicliffe, and Robert Unsworth.

"Go" was a minor hit in the UK charts.

=== Voting ===
Points awarded to the United Kingdom
Score	Country
12 points	Belgium; Italy; Turkey
10 points	Austria; Denmark; Finland; Germany; Israel; Spain
8 points	Luxembourg
7 points	Ireland
6 points	Greece
5 points	Norway; Sweden; Switzerland
4 points	
3 points	Portugal
2 points	
1 point	Iceland

Points awarded by the United Kingdom
Score	Country
12 points	Norway
10 points	Switzerland
8 points	Yugoslavia
7 points	Luxembourg
6 points	Netherlands
5 points	Germany
4 points	Israel
3 points	Ireland
2 points	Sweden
1 point	Turkey
