= Switzerland in the Eurovision Song Contest 1988 =

- Eurovision Song Contest 1988
- Participating broadcaster: Swiss Broadcasting Corporation (SRG SSR)
- Country: Switzerland
- Selection process: Concours Eurovision de la Chanson '88
- Selection date: 6 February 1988

Competing entry
- Song: "Ne partez pas sans moi"
- Artist: Céline Dion
- Songwriters: Atilla Şereftuğ; Nella Martinetti

Placement
- Final result: 1st, 137 points

Participation chronology

Switzerland was represented at the Eurovision Song Contest 1988 with the song "Ne partez pas sans moi", composed by Atilla Şereftuğ, with lyrics by Nella Martinetti, and performed by Céline Dion. The Swiss participating broadcaster, the Swiss Broadcasting Corporation (SRG SSR), selected its entry through a national final. The entry went on to win the Eurovision Song Contest.

== Before Eurovision ==
=== Regional selections ===
The Swiss Broadcasting Corporation (SRG SSR) held a national final to select its entry for the Eurovision Song Contest 1988. Each division of SRG SSR — Swiss German and Romansh broadcaster Schweizer Fernsehen der deutschen und rätoromanischen Schweiz (SF DRS), Swiss French broadcaster Télévision suisse romande (TSR), and Swiss Italian broadcaster Televisione Svizzera di lingua italiana (TSI) — used its own method to select its entries for the final. Eligible songs were required to have been composed by songwriters from Switzerland or Liechtenstein.

It is unknown how the regional broadcasters selected their songs, but 181 total songs were submitted (with 28 being invalid), of which ten were selected: three in French, German, and Italian, and one in Romansh. Among the rejected artists in the TSR preselection were Alain Morisod and Arlette Zola, the latter of whom represented Switzerland in 1982.

=== Concours Eurovision de la Chanson '88 ===
TSR staged the national final on 6 February 1988 at 20:40 (CET) at the Théâtre de Beausobre in Morges. It was hosted by Serge Moisson. The national final was broadcast on TV DRS (with commentary by Beat Antenen; also in Romansh commentary by Mariano Tschuor on TSR), TSR, and TSI (via TSR, with commentary by Giovanni Bertini). Popular theater troupe Mummenschanz made a guest appearance.

Ten songs were initially set to compete in the national final, with three songs in French, German, and Italian, and one in Romansh. Among the participants was Furbaz, who would later represent Switzerland in 1989. "Smile" by Yama, who was initially drawn to be the first song to perform, was later withdrawn by the composer due to the artist not meeting the age requirement and being less than 17 years old.

Participating entries
Broadcaster	Artist(s)	Song	Songwriter(s)		Language
Broadcaster	Artist(s)	Song	Composer(s)	Lyricist	Language
RTSI	Renato Mascetti	"L'isola"	Renato Mascetti		Italian
RTSI	Cocktail Band	"Tu sei"	Andreas Messerli	Beat Gfeller	Italian
RTSI	~~Yama~~	~~"Smile"~~	~~Daniele Christen~~		Italian
SF DRS	Hertz	"Muet"	Angelo Clematide; Carlo Schuster; Max Walter	Max Walter	German
SF DRS	Bernadette	"Balalaika in der Sommernacht"	Günter Loose		German
SF DRS	Manuela Felice	"Gibt es auf der Welt denn keine Liebe mehr?"	Enrico Peyer	Erica Brunelli	German
SF DRS	Furbaz	"Sentiments"	Marie-Louise Werth		Romansh
TSR	Isabelle Alba	"Clown dans la sciure"	Eric Weber	Pierre Alain	French
TSR	Gemo	"Prisonnier de l'amour"	Marco Schiess		French
TSR	Céline Dion	"Ne partez pas sans moi"	Atilla Şereftuğ	Nella Martinetti	French

The voting consisted of regional public votes from 50 individuals each which were sent to the three divisions of SRG SSR (SF DRS, TSR, TSI: German-Romansh, French, and Italian speaking, respectively), a press jury, and a 14-member expert jury. The winner was the song "Ne partez pas sans moi", composed by Atilla Şereftuğ, with lyrics by Nella Martinetti, and performed by Céline Dion.

Final — 6 February 1988
R/O	Artist(s)	Song	Regional Juries			Press Jury	Expert Jury	Total	Place
R/O	Artist(s)	Song	DRS	TSR	TSI	Press Jury	Expert Jury	Total	Place
1	Hertz	"Muet"	4	1	1	3	5	14	7
2	Isabelle Alba	"Clown dans la sciure"	1	3	2	4	3	13	8
3	Renato Mascetti	"L'isola"	6	4	10	8	7	35	3
4	Bernadette	"Balalaika in der Sommernacht"	5	8	3	6	2	24	5
5	Furbaz	"Sentiments"	7	7	6	7	10	37	2
6	Cocktail Band	"Tu sei"	8	6	7	5	4	30	4
7	Gemo	"Prisonnier de l'amour"	3	5	5	2	8	23	6
8	Manuela Felice	"Gibt es auf der Welt denn keine Liebe mehr?"	2	2	4	1	1	10	9
9	Céline Dion	"Ne partez pas sans moi"	10	10	8	10	6	44	1

== At Eurovision ==
At the Eurovision Song Contest 1988, held at the RDS Simmonscourt Pavilion in Dublin, the Swiss entry was the ninth entry of the night following Israel and preceding Ireland. The Swiss conductor at the contest was Atilla Şereftuğ, who composed the song and the 1986 Swiss entry, in which he also conducted. At the close of voting, Switzerland had received 137 points in total; and won the contest by a single point ahead of the United Kingdom.

This is the second of three instances where Switzerland won the Eurovision Song Contest, with their first victory being in the inaugural edition in 1956 with "Refrain" by Lys Assia and in 2024 with "The Code" by Nemo.

=== Voting ===
Each participating broadcaster assembled a jury panel with at least eleven members. The jurors awarded 1-8, 10, and 12 points to their top ten songs.

Points awarded to Switzerland
Score	Country
12 points	Germany; Portugal; Sweden
10 points	Greece; Ireland; Netherlands; Turkey; United Kingdom
8 points	Norway; Spain
7 points	Iceland; Italy
6 points	Yugoslavia
5 points	Finland
4 points	Belgium; Israel
3 points	
2 points	
1 point	France; Luxembourg

Points awarded by Switzerland
Score	Country
12 points	Luxembourg
10 points	Israel
8 points	Italy
7 points	Netherlands
6 points	Spain
5 points	United Kingdom
4 points	Ireland
3 points	France
2 points	Yugoslavia
1 point	Denmark

== Congratulations: 50 Years of the Eurovision Song Contest ==
In 2005, "Ne partez pas sans moi" was one of fourteen songs chosen by Eurovision fans and an EBU reference group to participate in the Congratulations anniversary competition. It was the only Swiss entry featured, although several Swiss entries were featured in clip montages and Lys Assia, who won the first-ever contest on behalf of Switzerland, made an appearance performing her winning entry "Refrain." The special was broadcast live on all three major Swiss public broadcasters, with 1991 Swiss entrant Sandra Studer commentating in German, Serge Moisson commentating in French, and Sandy Altermatt commentating in Italian.

"Ne partez pas sans moi" appeared eleventh in the running order, following "Everyway That I Can" by Sertab Erener and preceding "Hold Me Now" by Johnny Logan. Like the majority of entries that night, the performance was mostly by a group of dancers alongside footage of Dion's Eurovision performance, as Dion did not make an in-person appearance. At the end of the first round, "Ne partez pas sans moi" was not one of the five entries announced as proceeding to the second round. It was later revealed that the song finished tenth with 98 points.

=== Voting ===
Points awarded to "Ne partez pas sans moi" (Round 1)
Score	Country
12 points	Switzerland
10 points	Macedonia; Monaco
8 points	Poland; Ukraine
7 points	Andorra
6 points	
5 points	Greece; Turkey
4 points	Latvia; Russia; Serbia and Montenegro
3 points	Bosnia and Herzegovina; Malta; Portugal
2 points	Croatia; Netherlands; Sweden
1 point	Austria; Denmark; Iceland; Ireland; Israel; Norway
