= Iselin Alme =

Norwegian singer and stage actress

- Born: July 10, 1957 (age 69); Oslo, Norway

Iselin Alme (born 10 July 1957) is a Norwegian singer and stage actress. Alme was born in Oslo, but moved to Stavanger at an early age. She performed in variety shows before getting the role as Maria in West Side Story at Det Norske Teatret in 1982. Since then, she has acted in several roles, both in musicals and in plays. Among the productions she has taken part in are Godspell, A Chorus Line, Cats and Oklahoma, as well as Ionesco's La Leçon at Riksteatret. Alme has done a little screen work, but had a small role in the TV comedy "Pilen flyttebyrå" in 1987. After she married and had children in the early 1990s, she largely disappeared from the public eye, but has remained active in minor productions. She is the granddaughter of author Johan Borgen.
