= Cyprus in the Eurovision Song Contest 1988 =

- Eurovision Song Contest 1988
- Participating broadcaster: Cyprus Broadcasting Corporation (CyBC)
- Country: Cyprus
- Selection process: Internal selection
- Announcement date: 10 February 1988

Competing entry
- Song: "Thimame"
- Artist: Yiannis Dimitrou
- Songwriters: John Vickers; Aristos Moschovakis

Placement
- Final result: Withdrawn

Participation chronology

Cyprus was to be represented at the Eurovision Song Contest 1988. The Cypriot participating broadcaster, the Cyprus Broadcasting Corporation (CyBC), internally selected its entry for the contest, which was the song "Thimame", written by John Vickers and Aristos Moschovakis, and performed by Yiannis Dimitrou. On 12 March 1988, the broadcaster announced its withdrawal from the contest, after it was discovered that the entry had broken the rules of the contest by having already participated in the 1984 national final, and not having enough time to find a new entry. Cyprus was drawn to perform second in the contest.

== Before Eurovision ==
=== Internal selection ===
The Cyprus Broadcasting Corporation (CyBC) opened a submission period for composers to submit their entries until 9 January 1988. A total of 56 songs were submitted and on 10 February 1988, from 9:00 EET until 19:00 EET, a 16-member jury listened to the received submissions and chose the winning song.

In the final round of the internal selection, "Thimame", composed by John Vickers and Aristos Moschovakis, and performed by Yiannis Dimitrou won with 14 out of 16 votes (the other 2 votes went to the second-placing song). "Thimame" had taken part in the 1984 national final, and had also been sent to the CyBC twice for two different years.

Jury members
- Christodoulos Achilleoudis – music inspector for Secondary Education
- Lakis Charalambous – musician and singer
- Themis Christodoulou – former head of music programmes at CyBC
- Antonis Christoforidis – sound engineer at CyBC
- Barry Evangeli – disc jockey
- Chloe Ioannidou – CyBC music programme officer
- Lygia Konstantinidou – senior writer of music programmes at CyBC
- Georgios Kotsonis – composer and senior director of music programmes at CyBC
- Marinos Mitelas – music teacher and choir director
- Marios Papadopoulos – musician and partner of CyBC
- Georgios Salachoris – CyBC music programme officer
- Mike Sarridis – musician and partner of CyBC
- Nick Skins – musician and partner of CyBC
- Marios Skordis – CyBC TV programme officer
- Michalis Stavridis – music inspector for Primary Education
- Neophytos Taliotis – CyBC TV programme officer

=== Withdrawal ===
Not long after the song was announced to the public, newspapers were reporting that the song had broken the rules of the Eurovision Song Contest and of the Cypriot internal selection. The rules of the Cypriot internal selection stated that submitted songs must not have been heard by the public prior to 31 March 1988, and "Thimame" had been aired to the public as part of the 1984 national final. The full lyrics had also been published in magazines. Additionally, the composers of a song must not be known by the internal selection jury panel during the selection procedure, and while the composers of the songs had not been revealed during the 1984 Cypriot national final, they were published in newspapers from the time and this could have broken the impartiality rule of the jury panel, had any of the jury members seen those newspaper articles. It was later revealed that jury members had brought this up during the selection procedure, but the chairman of the jury had ignored their concerns. Additionally, the rules of the selection stated that all competing composers and lyricists must be Cypriot nationals, which John Vickers was not.

CyBC held unsuccessful meetings on 26 February and 28 February to resolve the problems with "Thimame", but were unable to reach a conclusion. On 11 March 1988, CyBC held another meeting and decided to withdraw "Thimame" as the Cypriot entry, announcing their decision on 12 March 1988. The regulations of the internal selection meant that the second placed song could not be used as a back-up entry, and as there was no sufficient time to find a new entry, CyBC withdrew from the Eurovision Song Contest 1988.

Aristos Moschovakis filed a court case against CyBC, believing the disqualification of "Thimame" on 11 March 1988 to be unlawful according to the regulations of the selection. The Supreme Court of Cyprus made a decision on 7 April 1988 and ruled in favour of CyBC, reaching three conclusions: that the decision to select "Thimame" was illegal as the selection jury was misled into believing it was a valid entry; that the decision to submit "Thimame" to the competition was illegal as it breached the conditions of the selection; and that the decision to withdraw the entry was legal.

== At Eurovision ==
Although Cyprus had withdrawn from the contest by 12 March 1988, there were several instances after the withdrawal where other sources believed Cyprus was still to be participating. Cyprus was drawn to perform second and was advertised in the Radio Times' information about the preview programme of the contest. "Thimame" also appears as song number two, in accordance to its initial performance draw, on the record release Melodi Grand Prix 1988 – the compilation disc of the contest's entries.
