= İlhan İrem =

Turkish singer and songwriter (1955–2022)

- Born: İlhan Aldatmaz; 1 April 1955; Bursa, Turkey
- Died: 28 July 2022 (aged 67) Istanbul, Turkey
- Genres: Rock; symphonic rock
- Occupations: Singer; composer
- Years active: 1969–2021

İlhan İrem (born İlhan Aldatmaz; 1 April 1955 – 28 July 2022) was a Turkish singer and songwriter.

== Early life ==
İlhan İrem was born in 1955 in Bursa. He had quite a free and happy childhood.

== Music career ==
He started taking solfeggio and singing lessons at secondary school but his music career started in high school during a period in which he was chosen as a soloist by the upper levels of the school orchestra. In 1970, Meltemler Orchestra, of which he was a member, won the first place in Marmara Region at the High School Music Contest organized by the Milliyet newspaper. During this period, he received offers from many professional music groups in Istanbul, but he preferred to stay in Bursa until 1972.

=== 1970s ===
In this period, he produced single plaques and romantic hit pieces, and in 1973 with his own resources he produced his first song Birleşsin Bütün Eller – Bazen Neşe Bazen Keder but could not receive the success he had intended. After record companies refused to give songs written by him to other artists, he produced his second song "Yazık Oldu Yarınlara – Haydi Sil Gözlerini" which made him one of the most popular singers in Turkey.

His fourth song, which he published in 1976, was removed from the market by the record label as a result of the pressures that they faced which addressed the issue of him questioning the god in the song. In 1976, he released his first LP record İlhan İrem 1973–1976. "Havalar Nasıl", "İşte Hayat", "Son Selam", "Ayrılık Akşamı", "Sen Bilirsin", and "Bal Ağızlım" all became number-one hits on music charts.

=== 1980s ===
In his own words, İrem decided to stay away from " the insincere people and meaningless crowds" and from "the popular culture that deals more with shapes rather than what people produce".

His search for a music style initiated with the theme of sadness in his songs in the '70s to the theme of peace and metaphysics in '80s. During that period he also wrote a rock symphony. After the publication of "Bezgin" which consisted of his compositions in 1981, he released the symphonic rock trilogy, which was the product of a seven-year work in 1983, and was prepared in three separate albums Pencere (1983), Köprü (1985), and Ve Ötesi (1987). The first album in the trilogy Pencere won a Golden Butterfly Award in 1983.

In 1984, he represented Turkey at the Golden Orfe Competition in Bulgaria. He also won the Journalists's Special Award.

In 1985, the second album from his trilogy Köprü and his first book Pencere... Köprü... Ve Ötesi... were released. In the book, İlhan İrem's musical narrative in Rock Symphony was written and a comprehensive research of Burak Eldem, İzzet Eti and Adnan Özer on İlhan İrem's music were included with the lines of this story. Again in 1986 he wrote the lyrics for the song "Halley" which was composed by Melih Kibar for Turkey to be presented at the Eurovision Song Contest and they received the best rating for Turkey up to that time. In 1987, the final album from his trilogy Ve Ötesi and a second book titled Uzaklarda Biri Var were released. They were followed by the albums Dünden Yarına, and Uçun Kuşlar Uçun, which was released in 1989. Ministry of Culture granted permission for taking the song "Blues For Molla" out of the album and including it in Uçun Kuşlar Uçun.

The invective that he had written following Khomeini's death fatwa for Salman Rushdie was released after 19 years on 29 October 2008 during the Republic's 85th anniversary.

==== Eurovision Song Contest ====
İlhan İrem, participated 3 times in Turkey's domestic finals for the Eurovision Song Contest. With the song "Bir Yıldız" he gained the right to represent Turkey in 1979 but was forced to do his military service. To be able to compete in the finals, although İrem was given special permission from the Turkish Armed Forces, but the record company disqualified the artist. İlhan İrem made another attempt in 1988 to represent Turkey with the song "Yurtta Barış Dünyada Barış" and in 1990 with the song "Komedi".

In 1986, he wrote the song Halley for the group "Klips ve Onlar" who represented Turkey at the contest.

=== 1990–2005 ===
In 1990s, he continued his career with the release of albums İlhan-ı Aşk, Koridor and Seni Seviyorum. In this period, he started to wear black outfits in response to the issues in society and the art environment, and completely withdrew from public concerts between 1992 and 2006. İrem withdrew from public life after a concert on 8 August 1992 in Gülhane Park. 14 years after this concert, which was attended by forty thousand people, the artist returned to the stage with a big concert on 29 September 2006, at the Istanbul Open Air Theater.

=== Post-2006 ===
He started his music with the release of Cennet İlahileri. İrem gave his first concert under the name "heart magic" and returned to the stage. During this period he released several books, advanced his music career, and organized numerous panels.

On 17 September 2013, at an interview with Akşam's Olcay Ünal Sert he said: "I never produce my works in certain patterns. Every one of them is alive. Each has a dynamic within itself. They're like symphonies. When I produce them, I'm completely trapped in them."

İrem was continuing his new album works and he had been giving concerts every year since 2006 in big cities such as Istanbul, Ankara and İzmir. He gave a concert in Bursa on 4 June 2016 after 30 years.

== Awards ==
During his career, İlhan İrem received 6 golden certificates in addition to other awards. Many magazines and newspapers including Hey and Ses have named him "artist of the year" a number of times.

== Other ventures ==
=== Painting and writing works ===
İlhan İrem, who worked in the field of abstract painting, created personal painting exhibitions from time to time. He was a columnist for Cumhuriyet, Aydınlık Gazetesi and Odatv.

== Personal life ==
He married Hansu İrem on 1 October 1991. İrem's late works feature lyrics by his wife, and his album covers are also shot by her. Hansu İrem also served as her husband's art director. They had no children.

== Death ==
He died on 28 July 2022. Mayor Ekrem İmamoğlu announced the news of his death via Twitter.

== Discography ==
=== Records ===
- Birleşsin Bütün Eller \ Bazen Neşe Bazen Keder (1973)
- Yazık Oldu Yarınlara \ Haydi Sil Gözlerini (1974)
- Anlasana \ Ne Güzel Bak Yaşamak (1975)
- Bir Varmış Bir Yokmuş (Kuklacı Amca) \ Hasretim Sana (1975)
- Ver Elini \ Üzülme Dostum (1975)
- Havalar Nasıl \ Gözünü Seveyim (1976)
- Sensiz de Yaşanıyor (İşte Hayat) \ Son Selam (1977)
- Ayrılık Akşamı (Sazlıklardan Havalanan) \ Sen Bilirsin (1978)
- Bir Zamanlar \ Yeni Bir Şarkı (1979)
- Er Mektubu Görülmüştür \ Bal Ağızlım (1980)

=== Albums ===
- İlhan İrem 1973–1976 (1976)
- Sevgiliye (1979)
- Bezgin (1981)
- Pencere (1983)
- Köprü (1985)
- Ve Ötesi (1987)
- Dünden Yarına (1988)
- Uçun Kuşlar Uçun (1989)
- Pencere… Köprü… Ve Ötesi… (1990)
- İlhan-ı Aşk (1992)
- Koridor (1994)
- Romans (1994)
- Sevgililer Günü \ The Best Of İlhan İrem 1. (1995)
- Aşk İksiri & Cadı Ağacı \ The Best Of İlhan İrem 2. (1997)
- Hayat Öpücüğü \ The Best Of İlhan İrem / 3. (1998)
- Bezginin Gizli Mektupları (2000)
- Uçuk Mavi Pencere (2000)
- Bulutlara Köprü (2000)
- Düşler ve Ötesi (2000)
- Seni Seviyorum (2001)
- Bir Meleğe Aşık Oldum / The Best Of İlhan İrem/ 4. (2003)
- Işık ve Sevgiyle 30 Yıl (2004)
- Cennet İlahileri (2006)
- Tozpembe/Progressive Çocuk Şarkıları(2008)

== Books by İlhan İrem ==
- Pencere... Köprü... Ve Ötesi... (Öykü / 1985)
- Uzaklarda Biri Var (Denemeler / 1987)
- Katastrof (Şiirler / 1990)
- Delirium (Denemeler / 1994)
- Millenium / Sanalizasyon Fareleri, Yarasalar ve Diğerleri (Denemeler / 1998)
- Siyah Kuğunun Şarkısı (Senfonik Şiir /2007)

== Books about İlhan İrem ==
- "Sürgün Gibi Masallarda" Michael Kuyucu (2008) Pegasus Yayıncılık
- "Işığın Aşkıyla İlhan İrem, Müziğin Mistik İlahı'" Özlem Süyev Zat (2008) Siyah-Beyaz yayınları
- "Ölümsüz Ozan İlhan İrem" Hakan Taştan, Ersin Kamburoğlu (2008) Cinius Yayınları
