= Miša Molk =

Slovenian journalist

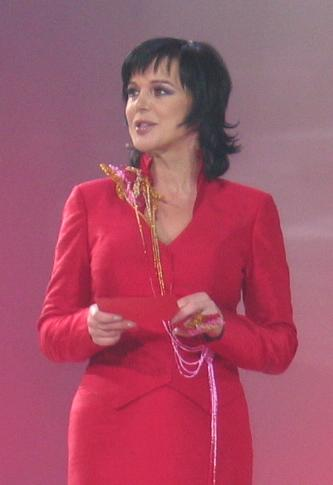
- Born: Marija Miša Molk; 6 September 1954 (age 71); Vrhnika, PR Slovenia, FPR Yugoslavia
- Known for: TV Personality

Marija Miša Molk (born 6 September 1954) is a retired Slovenian journalist and television personality. Molk is known for her long association with RTV Slovenija.

== Career ==
Born in Vrhnika, Molk graduated from the Ljubljana Faculty of Social Sciences. She is well known in Slovenia as a television presenter, producer, editor and journalist. She is also connected to the Eurovision Song Contest and is a member of the Reference Group in the European Broadcasting Union.

In June 2023, Molk retired from RTV Slovenia after creative differences with the broadcaster's management.

=== 1976–1989 ===
- Writing for national newspapers and magazine RTV SLO
- Youth Programme/weekly: presenter and author
- Entertainment Programme: TV quiz about international history and culture
- Eurovision Song Contest: commentator (1986, 1987 and 1989), Yugoslav spokesperson (1988)
- Song festivals: presenter

=== 1984–1989 ===
Student Center of Ljubljana University

- Manager of activities of students' interests, art courses, literary meetings, public tribunes about students' life and problems, organizing sport events, etc.

=== 1989–1996 ===
TV Slovenia

- Producer and presenter in the Entertainment Department:
1. Criss-Cross talk show, running 15 years
2. It's true, very successful talk show about the intimate and emotional life of the celebrity guests
3. Eurovision Song Contest, commentator (1990-1992, 1996-2000), Slovene spokesperson (1993 and 1995)
4. Jazz and pop music festivals
5. Writing in newspaper the agony columns; advice about life problems
6. Co-producer of travel shows: about the culture, entertainment and tourism of a certain region.

=== 1996–2004 ===
- Producer and presenter of the talk show It's true (till June 2003)
- Head of Entertainment and Sports at RTV SLO
- Public Broadcaster

=== 2004–2008 ===
- Executive Project Manager
- Ombudsman for viewers' and listeners' rights (May 2008)

=== Other activities ===
- Writing columns in national newspapers about men-women relations, prejudices, education, habits, politics etc.
- Presenting and producing national events on and off screen
- Anchor of interview programs on national television and magazines
- Member of EBU (European Broadcasting Union) Reference Group / making rules and decisions about preparation of the Eurovision Song Contest
- Member of EBU Format Group
- Vice president of EBU TV Bureau Light Entertainment Experts Group / developing new Entertainment formats and co productions
- Member of Board of RTV SLO
- Chairman of the jury awarding the annual biggest achievements on RTV SLO

== Awards ==
Viktor six times (awarded by the Stop magazine), Kristalni globus twice (awarded by Nedeljski dnevnik magazine), Zlati ekran twice (awarded by 7D-Monitor magazine).
