= I Can See Your Voice (Belgian game show) season 2 =

Television game show season

I Can See Your Voice
- Season 2
- Starring: Vincent Fierens; Kamal Kharmach; Kürt Rogiers; Ingeborg Sergeant
- Hosted by: Jonas van Geel
- Winners: Good singers: 2; Bad singers: 2
- No. of episodes: 4

Release
- Original network: VTM
- Original release: 2 September – 23 September 2022

Season chronology
- ← Previous; Season 1 Next → Season 3

The second season of the Belgian Dutch-language television mystery music game show I Can See Your Voice premiered on VTM on 2 September 2022.

Originally scheduled to have eight episodes and a tentative finale on 21 October 2022, the next episode on 30 September 2022 was replaced by an eighth season premiere of The Voice van Vlaanderen in its timeslot instead, prematurely ending the season.

== Gameplay ==
=== Format ===
According to the original South Korean rules, the guest artist(s) and contestants must attempt to eliminate bad singers during its game phase. At the final performance, the last remaining mystery singer is revealed as either good or bad by means of a duet between them and one of the guest artists.

If the last remaining mystery singer is good, the contestants win €2,500; this is also applied to the winning bad singer selected by them.

=== Rounds ===
1. First impression (Dutch: Eerste indruk)
  The guest artist and contestants are given some time to observe and examine each mystery singer based on their appearance.
2. Lip sync (Dutch: Lipsynchronisatie)
  Each mystery singer performs a lip sync to a song; good singers mime to a recording of their own, while bad singers mime to a backing track by another vocalist.
3. Test picture (Dutch: Testbeeld)
  The guest artist and contestants are presented with a video clue package containing possible clues by one of the mystery singers.
4. Sound box (Dutch: Klankkast)
  The guest artist and contestants are presented with video from a recording session by one of the mystery singers, but pitch-shifted to obscure their actual vocals.
5. Interrogation (Dutch: De ondervraging)
  The guest artist and contestants may ask questions to the remaining mystery singers. Good singers are required to give truthful responses, while the bad singers must lie.

== Episodes ==
Legend:
Good singer
Bad singer
— The contestants won the money.
— The winning bad singer stole the money.

Episode		Guest artist (Note: Players' notes: For the returning guest artists (who also include foreigners and former good singers), names are displayed in italics.; For the mixed groups, names who identified as bad singers are displayed in italics.)	Contestants	Mystery singers (In their respective numbers and aliases)						
#	Date	Guest artist	Contestants	Elimination order						Winner
#	Date	Guest artist	Contestants	First impression	Lip sync		Test picture	Sound box	Interrogation	Winner
1	2 September 2022	Metejoor	Lore and Freya → €2,500	. (Hand Model)	. (Roller Skater)	. Roberto Simone (Vegan Chef)	. Jens-Charlotte Bothuyne de Wolf (Taxi Driver)	. Jessi Perez (Señorita)	. (Babysitter)	. Wonder Boy
2	9 September 2022	Jérémie Makiese	Stephan and Thybault → €0	. Killian Baert (Trumpeter)	. Meher Boufateh (DJ)	. Brecht Geelen (Working Student)	. (Writer)	. Pauline Cloosterman (Pianist)	. Dana Rexx (Warrior)	. Elsa Lussakueno; Hairdresser
3	16 September 2022	Margriet Hermans	Annemie and Wendy → €2,500	1. LaToya Fierens; (History Student)	2. Sanou Sunthorn; (Life Coach)	3. Annick de Ridder; (Theatre Girl)	5. Macha Kokoeva; (Aqua Girl)	4. Michiel Janssens; (Gentleman)	6. Tim Saey; (Harmonicist)	7. Kelly Poukens; Farmer's Daughter
4	23 September 2022	Pauline Slangen and Regi Penxten (Note: Despite not singing, they were still counted as guest artists.)	Océane and Ivan → €0	2. Rémi Marcy; (Kindergarten Teacher)	3. Ninke Belmans; (Musical Fan)	7. Yamina Dupont; (Doctor Jazz)	5. Edith Stievenart; (Stewardess)	6. Freek Vanrooy; (Flemish Singer)	4. Mounir Abouroh; (Account Manager)	1. Monique Van Damme; Chansonnier

== Reception ==
Legend:
Highest rated episode
Lowest rated episode

No.	Title	Air date	Timeslot (CET)	Placement		Viewership				Ref(s)
No.	Title	Air date	Timeslot (CET)	TS	EV	Rank	Live	VOSDAL	Total	Ref(s)
1	"Metejoor"	2 September 2022	Friday, 20:35	2	8	9	384,803	Not reported		
2	"Jérémie Makiese"	9 September 2022	Friday, 20:35	2	8	10	407,030	Not reported		
3	"Margriet Hermans"	16 September 2022	Friday, 20:35	1	5	5	577,308	130,688	707,996	
4	"Pauline Slangen and Regi Penxten"	23 September 2022	Friday, 20:35	1	6	6	502,535	128,045	630,580	

Source: CIM
