= I Can See Your Voice (Belgian game show) season 1 =

Television game show season

I Can See Your Voice
- Season 1
- Starring: Vincent Fierens; Kamal Kharmach; Kürt Rogiers; Ingeborg Sergeant
- Hosted by: Jonas van Geel
- Winners: Good singers: 5; Bad singers: 2
- No. of episodes: 7

Release
- Original network: VTM
- Original release: 26 March – 7 May 2022

Season chronology
- Next → Season 2

The first season of the Belgian Dutch-language television mystery music game show I Can See Your Voice premiered on VTM on 26 March 2022.

== Gameplay ==
=== Format ===
According to the original South Korean rules, the guest artist and contestants must attempt to eliminate bad singers during its game phase. At the final performance, the last remaining mystery singer is revealed as either good or bad by means of a duet between them and one of the guest artists.

If the last remaining mystery singer is good, the contestants win €2,500; this is also applied to the winning bad singer selected by them.

=== Rounds ===
1. First impression (Dutch: Eerste indruk)
  The guest artist and contestants are given some time to observe and examine each mystery singer based on their appearance.
2. Lip sync (Dutch: Lipsynchronisatie)
  Each mystery singer performs a lip sync to a song; good singers mime to a recording of their own, while bad singers mime to a backing track by another vocalist.
3. Test picture (Dutch: Testbeeld)
  The guest artist and contestants are presented with a video clue package containing possible clues by one of the mystery singers.
4. Sound box (Dutch: Klankkast)
  The guest artist and contestants are presented with video from a recording session by one of the mystery singers, but pitch-shifted to obscure their actual vocals.
5. Interrogation (Dutch: De ondervraging)
  The guest artist and contestants may ask questions to the remaining mystery singers. Good singers are required to give truthful responses, while the bad singers must lie.

== Episodes ==
Legend:
Good singer
Bad singer
— The contestants won the money.
— The winning bad singer stole the money.

Episode		Guest artist (Note: Players' notes: For the returning guest artists (who also include foreigners and former good singers), names are displayed in italics.; For the mixed groups, names who identified as bad singers are displayed in italics.)	Contestants	Mystery singers (In their respective numbers and aliases)						
#	Date	Guest artist	Contestants	Elimination order						Winner
#	Date	Guest artist	Contestants	First impression	Lip sync		Test picture	Sound box	Interrogation	Winner
1	26 March 2022	Natalia	Davina and Rachel → €2,500	5. Rutger Mathijs; (French Chansonnier)	7. Daniël Dujardyn; (Boxer)	1. Thars Brisaert; (Pop Idol)	6. Charlotte Pole; (Miss Extravaganza)	3. Gert Snyers; (Drummer)	4. Varolyn Spaenjaers; (Graffiti Artist)	2. Yasmine Alves; Acrobat
2	2 April 2022	Christoff De Bolle	Evi and Christel → €2,500	5. Sonayou; (Rising Star)	4. Héritier Tipo; (Brussels Guy)	2. Ellen van den Heuvel; (Kitchen Princess)	7. Mathieu Bonsson; (Spring in the Fields)	6. Janni van Loco; (Rock n' Roll Mama)	3. Kheara Hendrickx; (Ballerina)	1. Wim Dekoker; Car Salesman
3	9 April 2022	Laura Tesoro	Ipek and Jennifer → €0	5. Maene Wouter; (Rockstar)	2. Lynneke van den Heuvel; (Siren)	6. Karolien Quintens; (Coquettish Hairdresser)	1. Eliman Steenbergen; (Personal Shopper)	4. Erica Sewsanker; (English Lady)	7. Wim Simons; (Priest)	3. Vincent de Coninck; Bookworm
4	16 April 2022	Gers Pardoel (Note: Season highlight: Foreign guest artist: Gers Pardoel (NLD; ep. 4))	Jona and Emily → €2,500	6. Jan Wuytens; (Classical Guy)	3. Julien Henrotte; (Grande Dame)	4. Dhazed Fyah; (Reggae Man)	7. Femke Willems; (Dancing Queen)	1. Renée Trompert; (Hostess)	2. Michael Maes; (American Football Player)	5. Oonagh Jacobs; Dreamgirl
5	23 April 2022	Pommelien Thijs	Amel and Jari → €2,500	1. Gwinny van Damme; (Amazon)	2. Roger Claeys; (Star Footballer)	3. Manuela de Hoog; (Mama Melody)	5. Sofie Vervaecke; (Dancing Diva)	4. Davide Cavaliere; (Street Musician)	6. Neela Wouters; (Music Teacher)	7. David Imbrechts and Michaël Lejeune; Duo
6	30 April 2022	Bart Kaëll	Helena and Anneke → €0	5. Jordan Mackampa; (Afro Dancer)	4. Marigo Bay; (American Girl)	1. Barbara de Clerke; (Creator)	3. Lars Verstraete; (Singer-Songwriter)	7. Johannes de Jongh; (Advocate)	6. Jan Pepermans; (Cabaret Artist)	2. Julie Guillen Jareno; Powergirl
7	7 May 2022	Belle Perez	Hannelore and Stijn → €2,500	7. Anissa Ringlet; (Garage Owner)	1. Timo de Keyser; (Musical Man)	5. Alice Avery; (Personal Trainer)	3. Stan Janssen; (Flemish Ed Sheeran)	2. Wim Vercammen; (Chef)	4. Selina Pearl; (Show Queen)	6. Gabriela Todorova; Bulgarian Pearl

== Reception ==
Legend:
Highest rated episode
Lowest rated episode

No.	Title	Air date	Timeslot (CET)	Placement		Viewership				Ref(s)
No.	Title	Air date	Timeslot (CET)	TS	EV	Rank	Live	VOSDAL	Total	Ref(s)
1	"Natalia"	26 March 2022	Saturday, 20:30	1	2	2	531,922	132,903	664,825	
2	"Christoff de Bolle"	2 April 2022	Saturday, 20:30	1	3	3	493,229	Not reported		
3	"Laura Tesoro"	9 April 2022	Saturday, 20:30	2	5	5	505,092	126,852	631,944	
4	"Gers Pardoel"	16 April 2022	Saturday, 20:30	2	4	4	479,550	Not reported		
5	"Pommelien Thijs"	23 April 2022	Saturday, 20:30	1	2	2	528,557	121,340	649,897	
6	"Bart Kaëll"	30 April 2022	Saturday, 20:30	2	6	6	408,041	Not reported		
7	"Belle Perez"	7 May 2022	Saturday, 20:30	2	3	3	530,101	89,951	620,052	

Source: CIM
