= I Can See Your Voice (Belgian game show) season 5 =

Television game show season

I Can See Your Voice
- Season 5
- Hosted by: Jonas van Geel
- No. of episodes: 4

Release
- Original network: VTM
- Original release: 9 January – 30 January 2026

Season chronology
- ← Previous; Season 4

The fifth season of the Belgian Dutch-language television mystery music game show I Can See Your Voice premiered on VTM on 9 January 2026. (Note: Despite being promoted as a 3rd season that has already existed from the remaining four episodes of the 2nd season, the 4th season (that has already finished airing between 25 April to 16 May 2025) was technically designated as the 5th season.)

== Gameplay ==
=== Format ===
According to the original South Korean rules, the guest artist and contestants must attempt to eliminate bad singers during its game phase. At the final performance, the last remaining mystery singer is revealed as either good or bad by means of a duet between them and one of the guest artists.

If the last remaining mystery singer is good, the contestants win €2,500; this is also applied to the winning bad singer selected by them.

=== Rounds ===
1. First impression (Dutch: Eerste indruk)
  The guest artist and contestants are given some time to observe and examine each mystery singer based on heart rate.

== Episodes ==
=== Guest artists ===
Legend:
Good singer
Bad singer
— The contestants won the money.
— The winning bad singer stole the money.

Episode		Guest artist (Note: Players' notes: For the returning guest artists (who also include foreigners and former good singers), names are displayed in italics.; For the mixed groups, names who identified as bad singers are displayed in italics.)	Contestants	Mystery singers (In their respective numbers and aliases)						
#	Date	Guest artist	Contestants	Elimination order						Winner
#	Date	Guest artist	Contestants	First impression	TBA					Winner
1	9 January 2026	Dana Winner	Eddy and Karla	1. ()	2. ()	3. ()	4. ()	5. ()	6. ()	7. ()
2	16 January 2026	Guga Baúl	Kyran and Trystan	1. ()	2. ()	3. ()	4. ()	5. ()	6. ()	7. ()
3	23 January 2026	Willy Sommers	Anaïs and Yince	1. ()	2. ()	3. ()	4. ()	5. ()	6. ()	7. ()
4	30 January 2026	Koen Wauters	Gina and Kaylee	1. ()	2. ()	3. ()	4. ()	5. ()	6. ()	7. ()

=== Panelists ===
Legend:
Upcoming panelist

Apps		Panelists in attendance (Sorted by first appearance, with episode designations)
g#	p#	Panelists in attendance (Sorted by first appearance, with episode designations)
TBA	6	Ruth Beeckmans, Karen Damen, Jaap Reesema, (Note: Panelists' note: Foreign attendee: Jaap Reesema (NLD)) Kürt Rogiers, Ingeborg Sergeant, and Jamie-Lee Six

== Reception ==
Legend:
Highest rated episode
Lowest rated episode

No.	Title	Air date	Timeslot (CET)	Placement		Viewership		Ref(s)
No.	Title	Air date	Timeslot (CET)	TS	EV	Rank	Total	Ref(s)
1	"Dana Winner"	9 January 2026	Friday, 21:05	1	5	5	647,037	
2	"Guga Baúl"	16 January 2026	Friday, 21:05	1	4	4	629,277	
3	"Willy Sommers"	23 January 2026	Friday, 21:05	1	5	5	587,882	
4	"Koen Wauters"	30 January 2026	Friday, 21:05	1	4	4	642,686	

Source: CIM
