= I Can See Your Voice (Belgian game show) season 3 =

Television game show season

I Can See Your Voice
- Season 3
- Starring: Vincent Fierens; Kamal Kharmach; Kürt Rogiers; Ingeborg Sergeant
- Hosted by: Jonas van Geel
- Winners: Good singers: 1; Bad singers: 3
- No. of episodes: 4

Release
- Original network: VTM
- Original release: 5 May – 26 May 2023

Season chronology
- ← Previous; Season 2 Next → Season 4

The third season of the Belgian Dutch-language television mystery music game show I Can See Your Voice premiered on VTM on 5 May 2023. (Note: Originally a continuation of its 2nd season, in which the 30 September 2022 episode was replaced by an 8th season premiere of The Voice van Vlaanderen from its timeslot, a URL address from NewsMonkey formally designated the remaining four episodes from the previous as a separate season.)

== Gameplay ==
=== Format ===
According to the original South Korean rules, the guest artist and contestants must attempt to eliminate bad singers during its game phase. At the final performance, the last remaining mystery singer is revealed as either good or bad by means of a duet between them and one of the guest artists.

If the last remaining mystery singer is good, the contestants win €2,500; this is also applied to the winning bad singer selected by them.

=== Rounds ===
1. First impression (Dutch: Eerste indruk)
  The guest artist and contestants are given some time to observe and examine each mystery singer based on their appearance.
2. Lip sync (Dutch: Lipsynchronisatie)
  Each mystery singer performs a lip sync to a song; good singers mime to a recording of their own, while bad singers mime to a backing track by another vocalist.
3. Test picture (Dutch: Testbeeld)
  The guest artist and contestants are presented with a video clue package containing possible clues by one of the mystery singers.
4. Sound box (Dutch: Klankkast)
  The guest artist and contestants are presented with video from a recording session by one of the mystery singers, but pitch-shifted to obscure their actual vocals.
5. Interrogation (Dutch: De ondervraging)
  The guest artist and contestants may ask questions to the remaining mystery singers. Good singers are required to give truthful responses, while the bad singers must lie.

== Episodes ==
Legend:
Good singer
Bad singer
— The contestants won the money.
— The winning bad singer stole the money.

Episode		Guest artist (Note: Players' notes: For the returning guest artists (who also include foreigners and former good singers), names are displayed in italics.; For the mixed groups, names who identified as bad singers are displayed in italics.)	Contestants	Mystery singers (In their respective numbers and aliases)						
#	Date	Guest artist	Contestants	Elimination order						Winner
#	Date	Guest artist	Contestants	First impression	Lip sync		Test picture	Sound box	Interrogation	Winner
1	5 May 2023	Bart Peeters	Jasper and Robbe → €0	3. Anne-Sophie Fostier; (Comedienne)	1. Tina Tyteca; (Football Referee)	6. Tiebe Blaton; (Running Man)	4. Gio Vano; (Construction Worker)	2. Emin Mektepli; (Carpet Vendor)	5. Joline Esalo; (Queen of R&B)	7. Nils Perreman; Cowboy
2	12 May 2023	Loredana de Amicis	Filip and Natasja → €0	3. Sandhya Maertens; (Influencer)	7. Silke Wossmann; (Backpacker)	1. Sarah Morel; (Equestrienne)	2. Maarten Lenaerts; (Garage Rocker)	4. Brecht van Arnhem; (Laboratory Technician)	5. Manny Willie; (Model)	6. Maikel Iliaens; Real Estate Broker
3	19 May 2023	Jaap Reesema (Note: Season highlight: Foreign guest artist: Jaap Reesema (NLD s3; ep. 3))	Glynis and Thalia → €0	1. Marc Mathijs; (Frontman)	5. Antonino Anzalone; (Delivery Boy)	3. Giovanni Fenty; (Mascot)	7. Dimi Tarantino; (Entertainer)	2. Martine Max and Caroline Max; (Singing Sisters)	4. Linda Maarseveen; (Jazzy Lady)	6. Emma Wenes; Ice Queen
4	26 May 2023	Silvy De Bie (Sylver)	Brecht and Evelynn → €2,500	6. Lucas Groene; (Emo Kid)	4. Pieter Depouillon; (Actor)	1. Anissa Moltina; (Princess of the Orient)	7. Jennifer Bertho; (Animator)	2. Stephan Marchant; (Optician)	3. Marie d'Hooge; (Tattoo Artist)	5. Jesska Fernandes; La Latina

== Reception ==
Legend:
Highest rated episode
Lowest rated episode

No.	Title	Air date	Timeslot (CET)	Placement		Viewership				Ref(s)
No.	Title	Air date	Timeslot (CET)	TS	EV	Rank	Live	VOSDAL	Total	Ref(s)
1	"Bart Peeters"	5 May 2023	Friday, 20:35	2	5	5	463,879	123,947	587,826	
2	"Loredana de Amicis"	12 May 2023	Friday, 20:35	2	7	7	500,775	108,301	609,076	
3	"Jaap Reesema"	19 May 2023	Friday, 20:35	2	4	4	527,532	107,037	634,569	
4	"Silvy De Bie"	26 May 2023	Friday, 20:35	2	5	5	523,933	84,918	608,851	

Source: CIM
