= I Can See Your Voice (Belgian game show) season 4 =

Television game show season

I Can See Your Voice
- Season 4
- Starring: Jaap Reesema; Kürt Rogiers; Ingeborg Sergeant; Jamie-Lee Six
- Hosted by: Jonas van Geel
- No. of episodes: 4

Release
- Original network: VTM
- Original release: 25 April – 16 May 2025

Season chronology
- ← Previous; Season 3 Next → Season 5

The fourth season of the Belgian Dutch-language television mystery music game show I Can See Your Voice premiered on VTM on 25 April 2025. (Note: Despite being promoted as a 3rd season that has already existed from the remaining four episodes of the 2nd season, it was technically designated as the 4th season.)

== Gameplay ==
=== Format ===
According to the original South Korean rules, the guest artist and contestants must attempt to eliminate bad singers during its game phase. At the final performance, the last remaining mystery singer is revealed as either good or bad by means of a duet between them and one of the guest artists.

If the last remaining mystery singer is good, the contestants win €2,500; this is also applied to the winning bad singer selected by them.

=== Rounds ===
1. First impression (Dutch: Eerste indruk)
  The guest artist and contestants are given some time to observe and examine each mystery singer based on heart rate.

== Episodes ==
Legend:
Good singer
Bad singer
— The contestants won the money.
— The winning bad singer stole the money.

Episode		Guest artist (Note: Players' notes: For the returning guest artists (who also include foreigners and former good singers), names are displayed in italics.; For the mixed groups, names who identified as bad singers are displayed in italics.)	Contestants	Mystery singers (In their respective numbers and aliases)						
#	Date	Guest artist	Contestants	Elimination order						Winner
#	Date	Guest artist	Contestants	First impression	TBA					Winner
1	25 April 2025	Stan Van Samang	Sigi and Isis	1. (Make-up Artist)	2. (Breakdancer)	3. (Dog Whisperer)	4. (Content Creator)	5. (Child Prodigy)	6. (Sports Fan)	7. (Activist)
2	2 May 2025	Isabelle A	Pieter and Tim	1. ()	2. ()	3. ()	4. ()	5. ()	6. ()	7. ()
3	9 May 2025	Sam Gooris	Kimberly and Stefanie	1. ()	2. ()	3. ()	4. ()	5. ()	6. ()	7. ()
4	16 May 2025	Ianthe Tavernier	Jesse and Maithe	1. ()	2. ()	3. ()	4. ()	5. ()	6. ()	7. ()

== Reception ==
Legend:
Highest rated episode
Lowest rated episode

No.	Title	Air date	Timeslot (CET)	Placement		Viewership				Ref(s)
No.	Title	Air date	Timeslot (CET)	TS	EV	Rank	Live	VOSDAL	Total	Ref(s)
1	"Stan Van Samang"	25 April 2025	Friday, 20:40	1	5	5	427,757	82,929	510,686	
2	"Isabelle A"	2 May 2025	Friday, 20:40	1	7	7	405,091	79,968	485,059	
3	"Sam Gooris"	9 May 2025	Friday, 20:40	1	4	4	494,839	98,121	592,960	
4	"Ianthe Tavernier"	16 May 2025	Friday, 20:40	1	5	5	450,618	76,501	527,119	

Source: CIM
