= Belgium in the Eurovision Song Contest 1987 =

- Eurovision Song Contest 1987
- Participating broadcaster: Belgische Radio- en Televisieomroep (BRT)
- Country: Belgium
- Selection process: Eurosong '87
- Selection date: 14 March 1987

Competing entry
- Song: "Soldiers of Love"
- Artist: Liliane Saint-Pierre
- Songwriters: Gyuri Spies; Marc de Coen; Liliane Keuninckx

Placement
- Final result: 11th, 56 points

Participation chronology

Belgium was represented at the Eurovision Song Contest 1987 with the song "Soldiers of Love", written by Gyuri Spies, Marc de Coen, and Liliane Saint-Pierre, and performed by Saint-Pierre herself. The Belgian participating broadcaster, Flemish Belgische Radio- en Televisieomroep (BRT), selected its entry through a national final. In addition, Walloon Radio-télévision belge de la Communauté française (RTBF) was the host broadcaster and staged the event at the Centenary Palace in Brussels, after winning the previous edition with the song "J'aime la vie" by Sandra Kim.

== Before Eurovision ==
=== Organization ===
Flemish broadcaster Belgische Radio- en Televisieomroep (BRT) competed in the Eurovision Song Contest 1987 for Belgium, while Walloon broadcaster Radio-télévision belge de la Communauté française (RTBF) hosted the event due to them winning the previous year. BRT decided to host another edition of Eurosong to select their entry for Eurovision.

=== Eurosong '87 ===
==== Competing entries ====
BRT had asked professionals from the music scene, record companies, producers, and publishers to propose artists to compete in Eurosong '87. The artists did not necessarily have to have had a song ready. More than seventy artists had been submitted by the end of the submission period. On 12 December 1986, a 12-member jury assessed the artists and chose twelve to compete in Eurosong '87. The jury consisted of: three members of SABAM (Mary Boduin, Ben Gyselinck, and Els Van Den Abeele), three representatives from Belgian TV (Tom Huybrechts, Marc Maes, and Johannes Thuy), three representatives from Belgian radio (Ro Burms, Paul De Wijngart, and Nora Nys), and three representatives from the press (Paul Cajot, Toni Smeulders, and Guido Van Liefferinge). The twelve chosen artists were: Daan Van Den Durpel, Angie Dylan, Margriet Hermans, Bart Kaëll, Curt Lawrence, Dan O'Neil, Sonia Pelgrims, Sofie, Liliane Saint-Pierre, John Terra, Vincent, and Judith Vindevogel. However, a few weeks before the final, Judith Vindevogel withdrew after a dispute with her producer.

| Artist | Song | Songwriter(s) |
|---|---|---|
| Angie Dylan | "Zeventien" | Fonnie de Wulf; Ann Christel |
| Bart Kaëll | "Carrousel" | Bart Kaëll; Hubert Hugo |
| Curt Lawrence | "De dans der macht" | Marc Vanhie |
| Daan Van Den Durpel | "Gigolo" | Daan Van Den Durpel; Stefan Verwey; Peter Gisterink; Mare Munster |
| Dan O'Neil | "Oh, mon amour" | Ron Marron |
| John Terra | "Champagne voor iedereen" | John Terra; Nelly Byl |
| Liliane Saint-Pierre | "Soldiers of Love" | Marc De Coen; Gyuri Spies; Liliane Keuninckx |
| Margriet Hermans | "In Slow Motion" | Ricky Diver; Margriet Hermans; Marc Dex |
| Sofie | "Door jou" | Sofie Verbruggen; Gyuri Spies; Johan Verminnen |
| Sonia Pelgrims | "Casanova" | Eddy Van Passel; Danny Van Passel |
| Vincent | "De wereld als ik droom" | Paul Despiegelaere; Walter Ertvelt; Hans De Booy |

==== Final ====
The national final was broadcast live at 20:20 CET on 14 March 1987 from the Amerikaans Theater in Brussels, and was hosted by Luc Appermont. The BRT Orchestra was conducted by Freddy Sunder. Voting was done by regional juries in the five Flemish provinces of Belgium, each consisting of forty television viewers between the ages of 16 and 60, and a professional jury. The professional jury comprised the same twelve members that chose the participating artists. All jury members voted by giving each entry a score out of ten. Saint-Pierre emerged the winner by a 5-point margin, having been placed first by four of the regional juries (and second by the other), but being ranked only sixth by the professional jury.

Final – 14 March 1987
| R/O | Artist | Song | Points | Place |
|---|---|---|---|---|
| 1 | John Terra | "Champagne voor iedereen" | 43 | 3 |
| 2 | Dan O'Neil | "Oh, mon amour" | 19 | 9 |
| 3 | Vincent | "De wereld als ik droom" | 0 | 11 |
| 4 | Margriet Hermans | "In Slow Motion" | 25 | 7 |
| 5 | Daan Van Den Durpel | "Gigolo" | 37 | 5 |
| 6 | Bart Kaëll | "Carrousel" | 58 | 2 |
| 7 | Angie Dylan | "Zeventien" | 40 | 4 |
| 8 | Sonia Pelgrims | "Casanova" | 24 | 8 |
| 9 | Curt Lawrence | "De dans der macht" | 9 | 10 |
| 10 | Sofie | "Door jou" | 30 | 6 |
| 11 | Liliane Saint-Pierre | "Soldiers of Love" | 63 | 1 |

Detailed jury votes
| R/O | Song | Professional Jury | Regional Juries | | | | | Total |
| R/O | Song | Professional Jury | Antwerp | Brabant | Limburg | East Flanders | West Flanders | Total |
|---|---|---|---|---|---|---|---|---|
| 1 | "Champagne voor iedereen" | 6 | 6 | 6 | 10 | 8 | 7 | 43 |
| 2 | "Oh, mon amour" | 3 | 3 | 2 | 4 | 2 | 5 | 19 |
| 3 | "De wereld als ik droom" | | | | | | | 0 |
| 4 | "In Slow Motion" | 1 | 8 | 7 | 2 | 5 | 2 | 25 |
| 5 | "Gigolo" | 8 | 7 | 5 | 7 | 4 | 6 | 37 |
| 6 | "Carrousel" | 12 | 10 | 8 | 8 | 10 | 10 | 58 |
| 7 | "Zeventien" | 2 | 5 | 12 | 6 | 7 | 8 | 40 |
| 8 | "Casanova" | 7 | 4 | 3 | 3 | 3 | 4 | 24 |
| 9 | "De dans der macht" | 4 | 1 | 1 | 1 | 1 | 1 | 9 |
| 10 | "Door jou" | 10 | 2 | 4 | 5 | 6 | 3 | 30 |
| 11 | "Soldiers of Love" | 5 | 12 | 10 | 12 | 12 | 12 | 63 |

== At Eurovision ==
On the night of the final Saint-Pierre performed 5th in the running order, following Iceland and preceding Sweden. At the close of the voting "Soldiers of Love" had received 56 points with votes from 12 countries (the highest mark being 8 from the United Kingdom), placing Belgium 11th out of 22 entries. The Belgian jury awarded its 12 points to contest winners Ireland.

The contest was shown on TV1 with commentary by Luc Appermont, and RTBF1. It was also broadcast on a radio station BRT 2.

=== Voting ===
Points awarded to Belgium
| Score | Country |
|---|---|
| 12 points | |
| 10 points | |
| 8 points | United Kingdom |
| 7 points | Spain |
| 6 points | Italy |
| 5 points | Cyprus; Luxembourg; Norway |
| 4 points | Germany; Turkey; Yugoslavia |
| 3 points | Austria; Finland |
| 2 points | Israel |
| 1 point | |

Points awarded by Belgium
| Score | Country |
|---|---|
| 12 points | Ireland |
| 10 points | Germany |
| 8 points | Yugoslavia |
| 7 points | Norway |
| 6 points | Israel |
| 5 points | Italy |
| 4 points | Iceland |
| 3 points | United Kingdom |
| 2 points | Greece |
| 1 point | Sweden |
