= Reynaert =

Belgian singer-songwriter (1955–2020)

- Joseph Reynaerts in 1988

Background information
- Birth name: Joseph Reynaerts
- Born: 24 July 1955; Seraing, Belgium
- Died: 5 November 2020 (aged 65); Seraing, Belgium
- Genres: Pop
- Occupation: Singer-songwriter

Reynaert (born Joseph Reynaerts; 24 July 1955 – 5 November 2020) was a Belgian singer-songwriter, best known for his participation in the 1988 Eurovision Song Contest.

== Early career ==
Reynaert was born in Seraing, and started busking at the age of 18. In 1978 he won the annual music competition in the town of Spa with the song "Cerf-volant" ("Kite"), which was released as a single. Another single, "Pas assez" ("Not Enough"), followed in 1982 and he released his first album in 1984.

== Eurovision Song Contest ==
In 1988, Reynaert's song "Laissez briller le soleil" ("Let the Sun Shine") was chosen as the Belgian representative in the 33rd Eurovision Song Contest, which took place on 30 April in Dublin. It was a reflective song that finished the evening in joint 18th place of 21 entries, having received points solely from the French jury. "Laissez briller le soleil" was released as a single but met with little success.

== Later career ==
He was a director at Centre Culturel de Soumagne, Belgium, until his death. In the night of 4 to 5 November 2020, Reyneart died of COVID-19 during the pandemic in Belgium.

Preceded by Liliane Saint-Pierre with "Soldiers of Love"	Belgium in the Eurovision Song Contest; 1988	Succeeded by Ingeborg (singer) with "Door de wind"
