= I Can See Your Voice (Belgian game show) =

Belgian Dutch-language television game show

- Genre: Game show
- Based on: I Can See Your Voice by Lee Seon-young
- Creative director: Hans Otten
- Presented by: Jonas van Geel
- Starring: The celebrity panelists (see cast)
- Country of origin: Belgium
- Original language: Dutch
- No. of seasons: 5
- No. of episodes: 23

Production
- Producers: Suzy Fayoumi; Annelies Siebens
- Camera setup: Multi-camera
- Production company: Warner Bros. International Television Production

Original release
- Network: VTM
- Release: 26 March 2022 – 30 January 2026

Related
- I Can See Your Voice franchise

I Can See Your Voice is a Belgian Dutch-language television mystery music game show based on the South Korean programme of the same title, featuring its format where guest artist(s) and contestants attempt to eliminate bad singers from the group, until the last mystery singer remains for a duet performance. It first aired on VTM on 26 March 2022.

== Gameplay ==
=== Format ===
Over the course of five rounds, the guest artist and a pair of contestants must attempt to eliminate bad singers from a group of seven "mystery singers", identified only by their occupation or alias, without ever hearing them perform live. They are assisted by clues regarding the singers' backgrounds, style of performance, and observations from a celebrity panel. At the end of a game, the last remaining mystery singer is revealed as either good or bad by means of a duet between them and one of the guest artists.

If the last remaining mystery singer is good, the contestants win €2,500; this is also applied to the winning bad singer selected by them.

=== Rounds ===
==== Visual round ====
- First impression (Dutch: Eerste indruk)

s1–5: The guest artist and contestants are given some time to observe and examine each mystery singer based on their appearance (s1–3) or heart rate (s4–5).

==== Lip sync round ====
- Lip sync (Dutch: Lipsynchronisatie)

s1–3: Each mystery singer performs a lip sync to a song; good singers mime to a recording of their own, while bad singers mime to a backing track by another vocalist.

==== Evidence round ====
- Test picture (Dutch: Testbeeld)

s1–3: The guest artist and contestants are presented with a video package containing possible clues by one of the mystery singers.

==== Rehearsal round ====
- Sound box (Dutch: Klankkast)

s1–3: The guest artist and contestants are presented with video from a recording session by one of the mystery singers, but pitch-shifted to obscure their actual vocals.

==== Interrogation round ====
- Interrogation (Dutch: De ondervraging)

s1–3: The guest artist and contestants may ask questions to the remaining mystery singers. Good singers are required to give truthful responses, while the bad singers must lie.

== Production ==
Following the success of The Masked Singer, DPG Media formally acquired the rights to produce a Belgian adaptation of I Can See Your Voice for the Dutch-speaking community (especially Flanders) in March 2021, with Warner Bros. International Television Production assigning on production duties.

== Broadcast history ==
I Can See Your Voice debuted on 26 March 2022, with filming taking place at VTM Studios in Vilvoorde.

While the first season broadcasts still ongoing, VTM has already renewed the series for a second season, which premiered on 2 September 2022. However, the next episode originally scheduled to continue on 30 September 2022, was replaced by an eighth season premiere of The Voice van Vlaanderen in its timeslot instead, prematurely ending the season; these remaining four episodes from the previous would begin airing a separate third season on 5 May 2023. One day following its finale, VTM has already renewed the series for a fourth season, which premiered on 25 April 2025.

Before the end of 2025, VTM has announced that the series would renew for a fifth season, which began airing on 9 January 2026.

== Cast ==
The series employs a panel of celebrity "detectives" who assist the guest artist and contestants in identifying good and bad mystery singers throughout the game. Overall, six celebrities have served as panelists, with their original lineup consisting of Vincent Fierens, Kamal Kharmach, Kürt Rogiers, and Ingeborg Sergeant. Later members who joined the group's duties also include Jaap Reesema and Jamie-Lee Six — from the 4th season.

| Designations: |
H Hosting duties
g# Total games attended, by panelists

| Cast member | Seasons | | | | |
| Cast member | 1 | 2 | 3 | 4 | 5 |
|---|---|---|---|---|---|
| Jonas van Geel | H | H | H | H | H |
| Vincent Fierens | 7 | 4 | 4 | | — |
| Kamal Kharmach | 7 | 4 | 4 | | — |
| Kürt Rogiers | 7 | 4 | 4 | 4 | — |
| Ingeborg Sergeant | 7 | 4 | 4 | 4 | — |
| Jaap Reesema | | | | 4 | — |
| Jamie-Lee Six | | | | 4 | — |

== Series overview ==
| Series | Episodes | Originally released | | Good singers | Bad singers |
| Series | Episodes | First released | Last released | Good singers | Bad singers |
|---|---|---|---|---|---|
| 1 | 7 | 26 March 2022 | 7 May 2022 | 5 | 2 |
| 2 | 4 | 2 September 2022 | 23 September 2022 | 2 | 2 |
| 3 | 4 | 5 May 2023 | 26 May 2023 | 1 | 3 |
| 4 | 4 | 25 April 2025 | 16 May 2025 | —N/a | —N/a |
| 5 | 4 | 9 January 2026 | 30 January 2026 | —N/a | —N/a |

== Episodes ==
=== Season 1 (2022) ===
List of season 1 episodes
| No. overall | No. in season | Guest artist(s) | Player order (Note: It refers to the guest artist(s) that have played in according to their first game; returning guest artists (which also include foreigners or former good singers, with their names displaying in italics) are not counted.) | Contestants | Original release date | BEL (Dutch) viewers (exact count) |
|---|---|---|---|---|---|---|
| 1 | 1 | Natalia | 1 | Davina and Rachel | 26 March 2022 | 664,825 |
| 2 | 2 | Christoff De Bolle | 2 | Evi and Christel | 2 April 2022 | NR |
| 3 | 3 | Laura Tesoro | 3 | Ipek and Jennifer | 9 April 2022 | 631,944 |
| 4 | 4 | Gers Pardoel (Note: Foreign guest artists: Netherlands — Gers Pardoel and Jaap Reesema (Note: Highlight: Jaap Reesema (s3 ep. 3) also returned on his 2nd game as a foreigner, when he last played for the Dutch 3rd season.)) | 4 | Jona and Emily | 16 April 2022 | NR |
| 5 | 5 | Pommelien Thijs | 5 | Amel and Jari | 23 April 2022 | 649,897 |
| 6 | 6 | Bart Kaëll | 6 | Helena and Anneke | 30 April 2022 | NR |
| 7 | 7 | Belle Perez | 7 | Hannelore and Stijn | 7 May 2022 | 620,052 |

=== Season 2 (2022) ===
List of season 2 episodes
| No. overall | No. in season | Guest artist(s) | Player order | Contestants | Original release date | BEL (Dutch) viewers (exact count) |
|---|---|---|---|---|---|---|
| 8 | 1 | Metejoor | 8 | Lore and Freya | 2 September 2022 | NR |
| 9 | 2 | Jérémie Makiese | 9 | Stephan and Thybault | 9 September 2022 | NR |
| 10 | 3 | Margriet Hermans | 10 | Annemie and Wendy | 16 September 2022 | 707,996 |
| 11 | 4 | Pauline Slangen and Regi Penxten (Note: Despite not singing, they were still counted as guest artists.) | 11–12 | Océane and Ivan | 23 September 2022 | 630,580 |

=== Season 3 (2023) ===
List of season 3 episodes
| No. overall | No. in season | Guest artist(s) | Player order | Contestants | Original release date | BEL (Dutch) viewers (exact count) |
|---|---|---|---|---|---|---|
| 12 | 1 | Bart Peeters | 13 | Jasper and Robbe | 5 May 2023 | 587,826 |
| 13 | 2 | Loredana de Amicis | 14 | Filip and Natasja | 12 May 2023 | 609,076 |
| 14 | 3 | Jaap Reesema | — | Glynis and Thalia | 19 May 2023 | 634,569 |
| 15 | 4 | Silvy De Bie (Sylver) | 15 | Brecht and Evelynn | 26 May 2023 | 608,851 |

=== Season 4 (2025) ===
List of season 4 episodes
| No. overall | No. in season | Guest artist(s) | Player order | Contestants | Original release date | BEL (Dutch) viewers (exact count) |
|---|---|---|---|---|---|---|
| 16 | 1 | Stan Van Samang | 16 | Sigi and Isis | 25 April 2025 | 510,686 |
| 17 | 2 | Isabelle A | 17 | Pieter and Tim | 2 May 2025 | 485,059 |
| 18 | 3 | Sam Gooris | 18 | Kimberly and Stefanie | 9 May 2025 | 592,960 |
| 19 | 4 | Ianthe Tavernier | 19 | Jesse and Maithe | 16 May 2025 | 527,119 |

=== Season 5 (2026) ===
List of season 5 episodes
| No. overall | No. in season | Guest artist(s) | Player order | Contestants | Original release date | BEL (Dutch) viewers (exact count) |
|---|---|---|---|---|---|---|
| 20 | 1 | Dana Winner | 20 | Eddy and Karla | 9 January 2026 | 647,037 |
| 21 | 2 | Guga Baúl | 21 | Kyran and Trystan | 16 January 2026 | 629,277 |
| 22 | 3 | Willy Sommers | 22 | Anaïs and Yince | 23 January 2026 | 587,882 |
| 23 | 4 | Koen Wauters | 23 | Gina and Kaylee | 30 January 2026 | 642,686 |
