= Luc Appermont =

Flemish television presenter

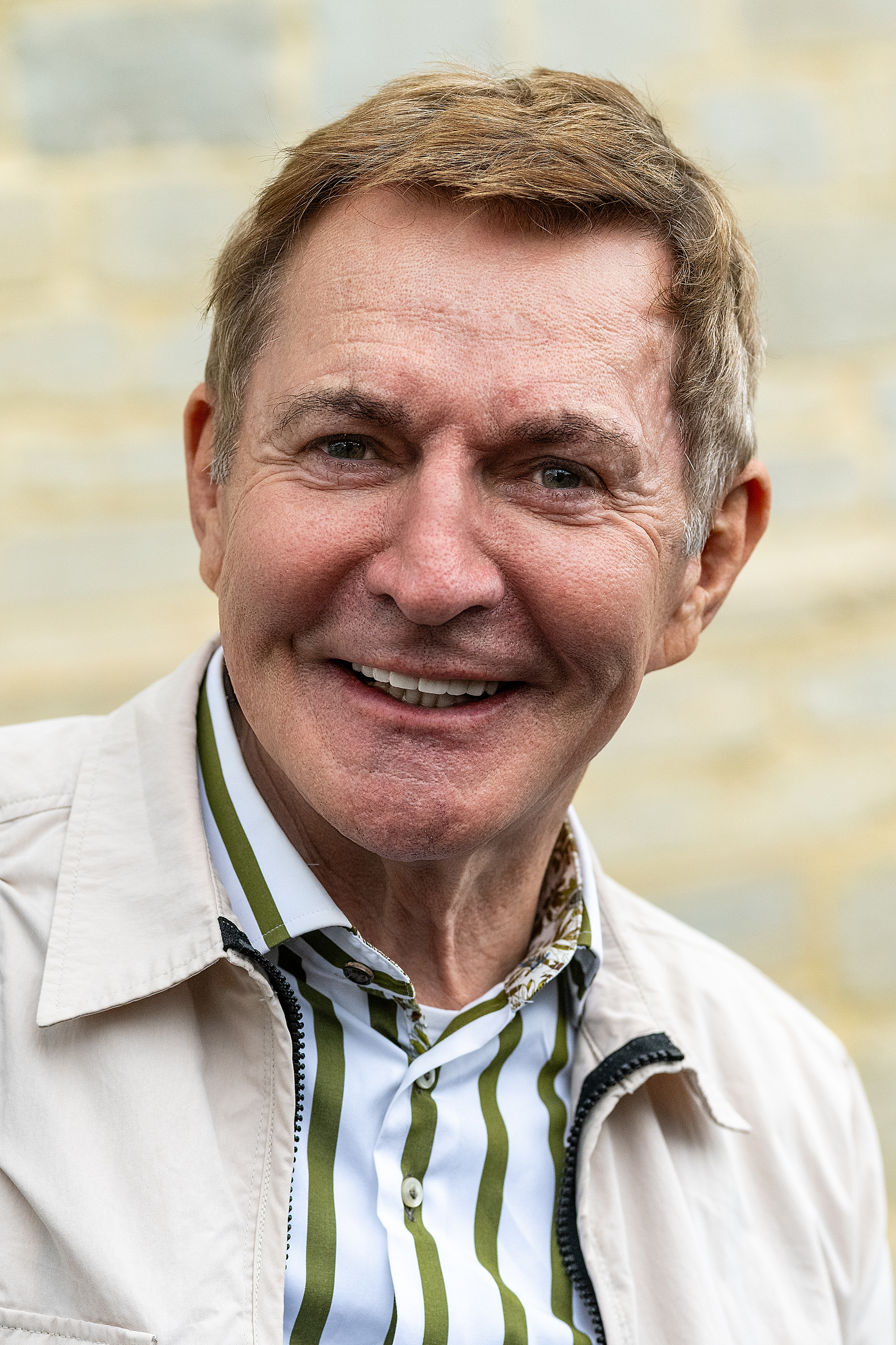
- Luc Appermont in 2025
- Born: Luc Jozef Amelie Appermont; 4 October 1949 (age 76); Bilzen, Belgium
- Occupation: television presenter
- Employer(s): BRT, VTM
- Partner: Bart Kaëll

Luc Jozef Amelie Appermont (born 4 October 1949) is a Flemish television presenter. He started his career on Radio 2 as a radio announcer, he hosted the talent show Observatory. From 1976 until 1990 he was the regular Belgian commentator for the Dutch speaking region in the Eurovision Song Contest.

In 1990, Appermont left BRT and went to the commercial broadcaster VTM, where he hosted his talkshow Luc. He is a native of Bilzen, Belgium.

Appermont, at various points, also hosted the Belgian versions of both Jeopardy! and Wheel of Fortune.
