= VTM Nieuws =

Belgian news programme

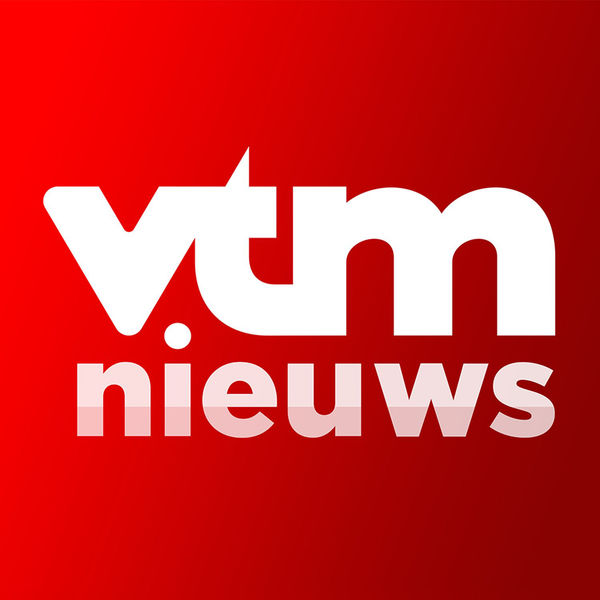
- Genre: News
- Theme music composer: Peter Meyvaert
- Country of origin: Belgium
- Original language: Dutch

Production
- Production locations: Vilvoorde (1989-2020); Antwerp (2020-present)
- Camera setup: Multi-camera
- Running time: 15-60 minutes
- Production company: DPG Media

Original release
- Network: VTM
- Release: 1 February 1989 – present

VTM Nieuws is the name of the daily news broadcasts on the Flemish television network VTM. The bulletins were the first competition to VRT NWS Journaal, the news programmes broadcast by the VRT.

== History ==
VTM Nieuws was first broadcast on 1 February 1989, the same night that VTM itself launched. As VTM's popularity grew, so did that of its news bulletins, with VTM Nieuws becoming a formidable competitor to Het Journaal throughout the 1990s. In its early years, VTM Nieuws was known for its relative innovations: its main bulletin, broadcast at 7pm, was presented by two newscasters, which was hitherto unheard of within Flanders; it was also the first Flemish news programme to broadcast a bulletin in the afternoon, and to have its newscasters present from within the newsroom.

At the turn of the century, however, viewing figures began to decline, due to modernisation efforts by the VRT. In 2004, VTM Nieuws was renamed to Het Nieuws, as part of a major rebranding exercise: a new studio was built, featuring a large videowall; all bulletins were now presented by one newscaster, and several new on-screen faces were introduced. This led to a rise in ratings, although the effect wore off after a few years.

In 2013, Het Nieuws was renamed back to VTM Nieuws, bringing with it a new logo and studio; a new editorial direction was also introduced, with more attention being paid to political, international and cultural news. Following this rebrand, the popularity of the broadcasts once again increased.

On 3 February 2020, production of VTM Nieuws moved from its former base in Vilvoorde to a new building in Antwerp, shared with journalists from Het Laatste Nieuws. Together, they have approx. 400 employees. VTM Nieuws can also use the expertise of the journalists of Het Laatste Nieuws, if they need to.

== Presenters ==
=== Current presenters ===
- Stef Wauters (2004–present)
- Cathérine Moerkerke (2004-2013, 2015, 2019–present)
- Freek Braeckman (2017–present)
- Birgit Herteleer (2021–present)

=== Former presenters ===
- Birgit Van Mol (1998–2021)
- Dany Verstraeten (1989–2023)
- Danny Huwé (1989)
- Mark Demesmaeker (1991-2004)
