= Bart Kaëll =

Belgian singer

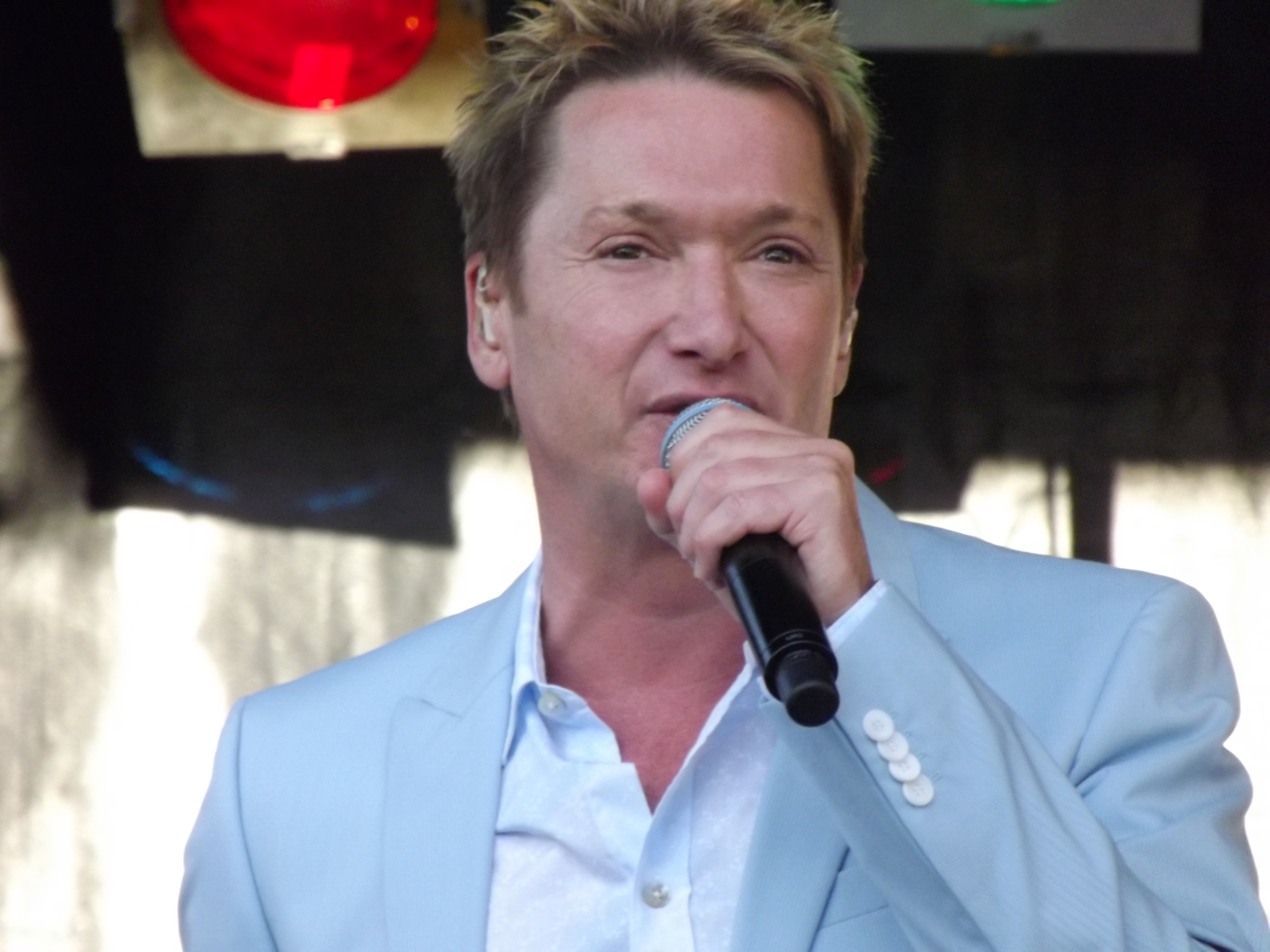
- Kaëll in 2011

Background information
- Born: Bart Marcel Emilienne Gyselinck
- Occupations: Singer songwriter television presenter
- Instrument: Vocals
- Years active: 1982–present
- Label: Vlaamse Sterren

Bart Kaëll is the stage name of Bart Marcel Emilienne Gyselinck, a Flemish singer and TV host.

== Career ==
Kaëll studied music in Antwerp, after finishing school he landed a job as a singer and in 1982 he took part in the Baccara-beker, which he won. In 1983 Kaëll took part in Eurosong (Belgium heats for the Eurovision Song Contest) with the song Symphonie, he finished in third place. His next single La mamadora did well in the Flemish charts which he released in 1986. Kaëll took part again in Eurosong in 1987 with the song Carrousel, he was a favourite to win and represent Belgium at the Eurovision, however at the close of voting Carrousel had picked up 58 points placing Kaëll in second place, the winner was Liliane Saint-Pierre.

In 1997 Kaëll was offered by VTM to host the talent shows Soundmixshow (Dutch counterpart of the UK's Stars in Their Eyes) and Rad van Fortuin.

== Personal life ==
In 2010, in response to rumors, Kaëll came out as homosexual; his partner is television presenter Luc Appermont.

== Discography ==
=== Albums ===
- Bart Kaëll (1989)
- Amor Amor (1990)
- Mini Playback (1990)
- Gewoon omdat ik van je hou (1991)
- Bart Kaëll in kleur (1992)
- Dicht bij jou (1993)
- Het beste van Bart Kaëll (1994)
- Nooit meer alleen (1995)
- Dag en Nacht (1997)
- Noord en Zuid (1998)
- Face to Face (1998)
- 15 jaar Bart Kaëll (1999)
- Costa Romantica (mit Vanessa Chinitor; 2001)
- Het beste van Bart Kaëll – 25 jaar hits (2008)
- Hallo, hier ben ik (2011)

=== Singles ===
- "Symphonie" (1983)
- "La Mamadora" (1986)
- "Carrousel" (1987)
- "De Marie-Louise" (1989)
- "Duizend terrassen in Rome" (1989)
- "Zeil je voor het eerst" (1989)
- "Ik heb je lief" (1998)
- "Beetje bij beetje" (2002)
- "Het is volle maan vannacht" (2006)
- "Dansen in Bahia" (2008)
- "Donder en bliksem" (2009)
- "Hallo goeie morgen!" (2010)
- "Mee met de wind" (2010)
- "Elke dag een beetj mooier" (2010)
- "Beetje gek" (2011)
- "Kap'tein" (2012)
