= Liliane Saint-Pierre =

Belgian singer (born 1948)

Liliane Saint Pierre
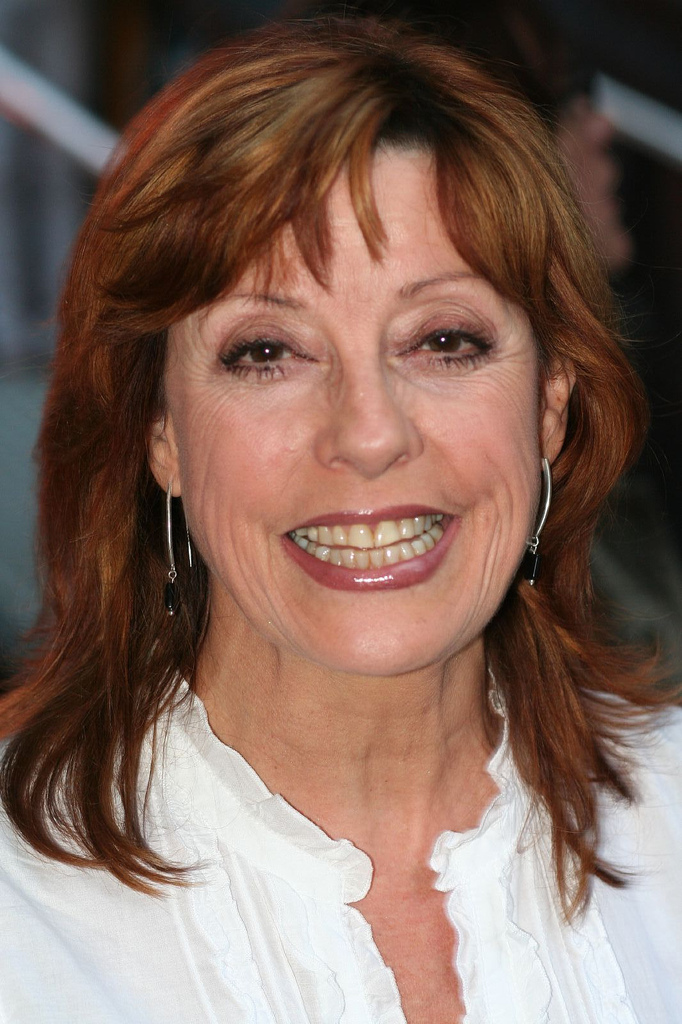
- Saint-Pierre in Stockholm in 2007
- Born: Liliane Louise Keuninckx; 18 December 1948 (age 77); Molenstede, Belgium
- Occupation: Singer

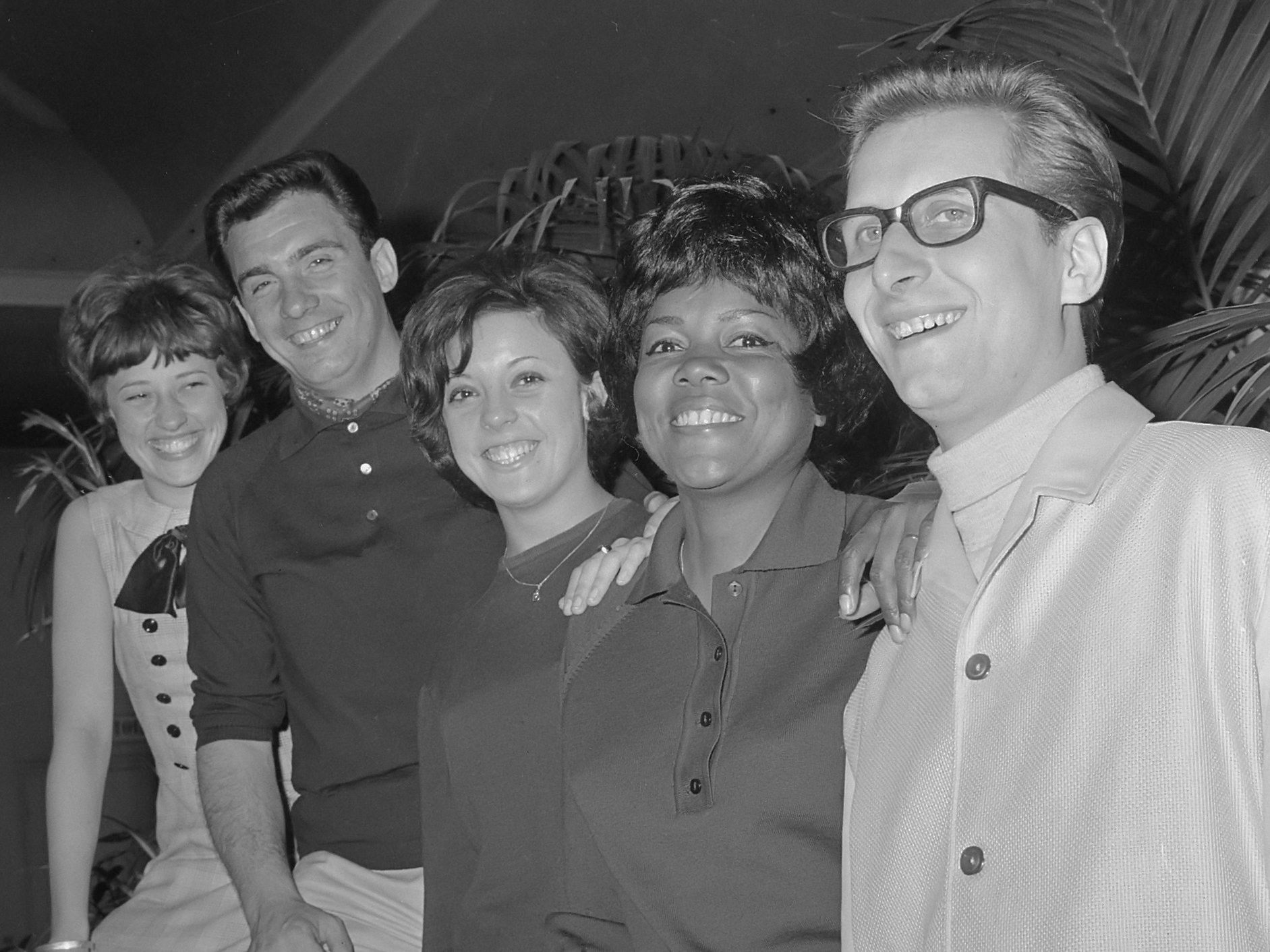
V.l.t.r. Tonia, Maurice Dean, Liliane, Cecily Forde and Eddie DeFacq (1965)

Liliane Saint-Pierre (born Liliane Louise Keuninckx, 18 December 1948) is a Belgian pop singer. Hailing from Flanders, she sings mostly in Dutch. She competed at Eurovision Song Contest 1987 with the song "Soldiers of Love".

== Biography ==
Liliane Saint-Pierre was born in Molenstede, Flemish Brabant, as Liliane Keuninckx. She started her career in the 1960s when she was 13 years old. The biggest hit of her early success period was "We gotta stop" sung in Dutch. At that time she performed as Liliane.

Her success didn't stay unnoticed. She became acquainted with Claude François, a French singer and producer, and asked him to promote her in France. He accepted the offer, but decided Liliane was too short for a stage name. He added Saint-Pierre to give it a more French sound and together with him as producer Saint-Pierre records about twenty songs. These songs were successful in Belgium and France. Saint-Pierre performs at the Olympia in Paris. But the collaboration ended abruptly after a disagreement between Claude François and her manager of that time (and father-in-law) Milo De Coster.

In the early 1970s, Saint-Pierre took part in the Bible musical Glory Halleluja 2000 by Group Miloscope. Several songs of the musical were released as singles. There was a huge tour set up in churches around Belgium, The Netherlands, Germany and France.

After trundling along at the end of the 1970s, Saint-Pierre's career was stuck in a musical deadlock. Said Saint-Pierre: "It was almost irreversible, until the Belgian entertainer Bobbejaan Schoepen called me for a series of performances in his park. Suddenly I had a year of work. This decision was taken soon; the mentality of the army was not consistent with my worldview."

Saint-Pierre represented Belgium in the Eurovision Song Contest 1987, where she sang "Soldiers of Love" in Dutch (a song with a strong pacifistic tone). She finished in 11th place with 56 points. Saint-Pierre had already made two previous attempts to reach the Eurovision final. She participated in 1978 Luxembourg's national final with the song "Mélodie" and 1981 Belgian national final with the song "Brussel". Following "Soldiers of Love", Saint-Pierre went on to record quite a few socially-engaged songs throughout her career.

After a few more quiet years, she made a successful comeback in 1996 with a new fresh dance sound. Her biggest hit of that period was "Ik wil alles met je doen", a dance remake of Dusty Springfield's hit "In Private". With her duet with the popular Flemish boyband Get Ready! entitled "Geef me tijd", she was discovered by a whole new and younger audience. This resulted in Saint-Pierre being one of the judges in the first season of the Belgian version of the talent show X-Factor.

Today Saint-Pierre still frequently records new material and she is still one of the most respected voices and live performers of Belgium.

== Discography ==
Saint-Pierre has sung songs in Dutch, German, French, English and even two songs in Italian.

=== Singles ===
- 1964 – "We gotta stop!"
- 1964 – "Waarom"
- 1965 – "Middernacht"
- 1965 – "Bij het strand"
- 1965 – "Verboden wensen"
- 1964 – "'k Hou niet meer van jou
- 1965 – "Quand vient la nuit" / "Pourquoi"
- 1966 – "Vivre comme dans les livres"
- 1967 – "Er staat een foto in een lijst" / "Te jong om alles te begrijpen"
- 1967 – "Leider, leider, leider" / "Du bist so wie ein Fremder"
- 1967 – "Jammer, jammer, jammer" / "Jij doet zoals een vreemde"
- 1967 – "Chou chou chou" / "Tu n'es plus même"
- 1967 – "Schuld bist du daran" / "Du hast dich verändert"
- 1967 – "Blauwe ogen liegen niet" / "Nu ben je heel anders"
- 1967 – "Eenzame Boy" / "Alle Tieners"
- 1967 – "Alle schuld ligt bij jou" / "Jij kunt altijd lief zijn"
- 1968 – "Je suis une fille toute seule" / "Quand ce jour là"
- 1968 – "Ma se questa volta" / "Ragazza Sola"
- 1968 – "Da Spiel ist vorbei" / "Was kommt dan"
- 1968 – "Wat moet ik doen?" / "Neen ik heb geen spijt"
- 1968 – "Oh, oh Marc Dex" / "Het is nog niet te laat"
- 1968 – "J'entends une symphonie" / "Le brouillard est tombé sur la ville"
- 1968 – "Plus jamais" / "Je ne suis pas un bonbon"
- 1969 – "Meisjeshart is toch niet van steen" / "Ik heb verdriet"
- 1969 – "Tadaptatata" / "Timtirlalu"
- 1969 – "Si loin des yeux, si loin du coeur" / "Parce que tu me quittes"
- 1969 – "Chanson sentimentale, pour une fille sentimentale" / "Les sept derniers jours"
- 1970 – "Only you" / "Vrij"
- 1970 – "Quand c'est fini, c'est fini" / "Je n'aimerai plus jamais"
- 1970 – "Nous resterons unis" / "Dieu seul sait"
- 1971 – "Das ist nun mal meine Persönlichkeit"
- 1972 – "God was dood" (Miloscope Bijbelserie)
- 1972 – "Dieu était mort" (Miloscope Bijbelserie)
- 1972 – "De vele talen van het hart" (met Stefaan) (Miloscope Bijbelserie)
- 1972 – "Les milles langues de l'amour" (Miloscope Bijbelserie)
- 1972 – "Levenstuin" (met Martine Morgan) (Miloscope Bijbelserie)
- 1972 – "Satan" (Miloscope Bijbelserie)
- 1972 – "Alles om ons heen is mooi" / "Dans, zing, lach en dans" (Miloscope Bijbelserie)
- 1974 – "Als je gaat" / "Liefste, als je bij me bent"
- 1974 – "Si tu pars" / "La nuit est sombre"
- 1974 – "Heb je nooit vaarwel gezegd" / "Geen zorgen"
- 1974 – "Feu de paille, feu de joie" / "Tout passe"
- 1975 – "Joue ma fille"
- 1975 – "Is het onmogelijk?"
- 1975 – "Santa Domingo" / "Mammy, please don't go"
- 1975 – "Santa Domingo" / "Zo lang er rode rozen zijn"
- 1975 – "Santa Domingo" / "Bitte, bleib noch hier"
- 1976 – "Liefde is leven" / "Eenzaamheid heeft vele namen"
- 1976 – "Dat is dan eenzaam zijn" / "Daarna"
- 1977 – "Love is" / "Driving"
- 1978 – "Mélodie" / "C'est un ami, pas un copain"
- 1981 – "Brussel"
- 1984 – "C'est la vie"
- 1985 – "Mijn grote liefde heet muziek"
- 1985 – "C'est la vie" (Franse versie) / "C'est toi ma musique"
- 1986 – "Liefde alleen/Dat weet je, dat weet ik ook"
- 1987 – "Soldiers of Love" (versions in Dutch, French and English)
- 1987 – "Geloven"
- 1988 – "Met jou wil ik de hemel zien"
- 1989 – "Sacha" (versions in Dutch and French)
- 1989 – "Ik hou van jou" / "'t Doet er niet toe"
- 1990 – "Nu jij moet gaan" / "Gezicht"
- 1990 – "Stille nacht" / "Daar"
- 1991 – "Eeuwig van je houden" / "Ziggy"
- 1991 – "Ik stop niet" / "Les guitarres de ma vie"
- 1992 – "Kom dichterbij" / "Come close to me"
- 1993 – "Ik vecht voor jou" (duet with Ignace)
- 1994 – "Nog altijd" (duet with De Bende)
- 1994 – "Jojo" / "Gezicht"
- 1995 – "Een schreeuw in de nacht"
- 1996 – "Ik wil alles met je doen" / "Opeens werd alles stil"
- 1996 – "Ik kom zacht naar je toe"
- 1997 – "Ik ben niet van jou"
- 1997 – "Rio"
- 1997 – "Geef me tijd" (duet with boyband Get Ready!)
- 1997 – "Verleiden" / "Verleiden" (Club Mix)
- 1998 – "Boven de wolken"
- 1998 – "Droomdans" / "Sorry"
- 1998 – "Eén moment met jou" / "In m'n bloed"
- 2000 – "There will still be love"
- 2001 – "Het verschil" / "Daar komt liefde van"
- 2003 – "Hou van het leven" / "Envie de vivre"
- 2004 – "Gevangen in jou" / "Femme en colère"
- 2006 – "Mijn leven" / "This is my life"
- 2006 – "Run to me (duet with Paco Garcia)" / "I'll stand by you" / "De Roos"
- 2009 – "Ik ben gelukkig zonder jou" (with Astrid Nijgh and Sophie Van Everdingen)
- 2010 – "Naar het Sterrenlicht" (duet with Mieke)
- 2011 – "Bang voor de zomer"
- 2012 – "Soldiers of Love" (2012-mix)
- 2012 – "Met je ogen dicht" (from the TV show In The Mix)
- 2013 – "Geef me adem"
- 2013 – "Jij blijft altijd naast me staan"

=== Studio albums ===
- 1968 – Mijn grootste successen (Polydor)
- 1969 – Zingt voor jou (Polydor)
- 1969 – Hier is Lilianne Saint-Pierre (Polydor)
- 1970 – Glory Hallelujah 2000 (versions in Dutch, French and English)
- 1971 – De duizend talen van het hart" / "Les milles langues de l'amour (Barclay; anthology with other artists)
- 1975 – Liliane Saint-Pierre (Dutch version) (Barclay)
- 1977 – Liliane Saint-Pierre (French version) (Barclay)
- 1977 – Liliane Saint-Pierre (collection – International Artists series) (Barclay)
- 1978 – Jezus People 2000 (versions in Dutch and French)
- 1987 – In Kontrast (Catharsis)
- 1995 – 31 Jaar (collection) (Polydor)
- 1996 – 31 Jaar + BONUS (collection) (Polydor)
- 1997 – Het beste van Liliane Saint-Pierre (collection)
- 1997 – Ik ben wie ik ben
- 1998 – Gewoon een vrouw
- 2002 – Soldiers of Love (collection)
- 2002 – Flèche Back '68 (collection)
- 2010 – Liliane Saint-Pierre (collection – Goud van Hier series)
- 2012 – Soldiers of Love 2012 (collection)

Preceded by Sandra Kim with "J'aime la vie"	Belgium in the Eurovision Song Contest; 1987	Succeeded by Reynaert with "Laissez briller le soleil"
