= The Voice van Vlaanderen season 8 =

The Voice van Vlaanderen
- Season 8
- Hosted by: An Lemmens (blind auditions & live shows); Aaron Blommaert; Gloria Monserez (battles & knockouts)
- Coaches: Koen Wauters; Jan Paternoster; Natalia Druyts; Mathieu Terryn; Laura Tesoro (Comeback Stage)
- Winner: Louise Goedefroy
- Winning coach: Natalia Druyts
- Runner-up: Johan Callaers

Release
- Original release: 30 September – 23 December 2022

The eighth season of The Voice van Vlaanderen premiered on September 30, 2022 on the VTM television network. It was announced in March 2022 that the show's eighth season would be returning in the second half of the year. Natalia Druyts and Koen Wauters returned for their seventh and eighth season, respectively. Jan Paternoster and Mathieu Terryn, who both founded a band of their own where they serve as a vocalist, joined the show as coaches for the first time, replacing Tourist LeMC and Niels Destadsbader. Meanwhile, Laura Tesoro returned for her second season as a coach of the Comeback Stage.

Louise Goedefroy was announced the winner of this season on 23 December, 2022, marking Natalia Druyts' second win as a coach. With Druyts win, she became the second coach after Jasper Steverlinck to win two consecutive seasons, additionally, she was the first female coach to achieve this.

== Coaches and hosts ==
The Voice van Vlaanderen season 8 coaches

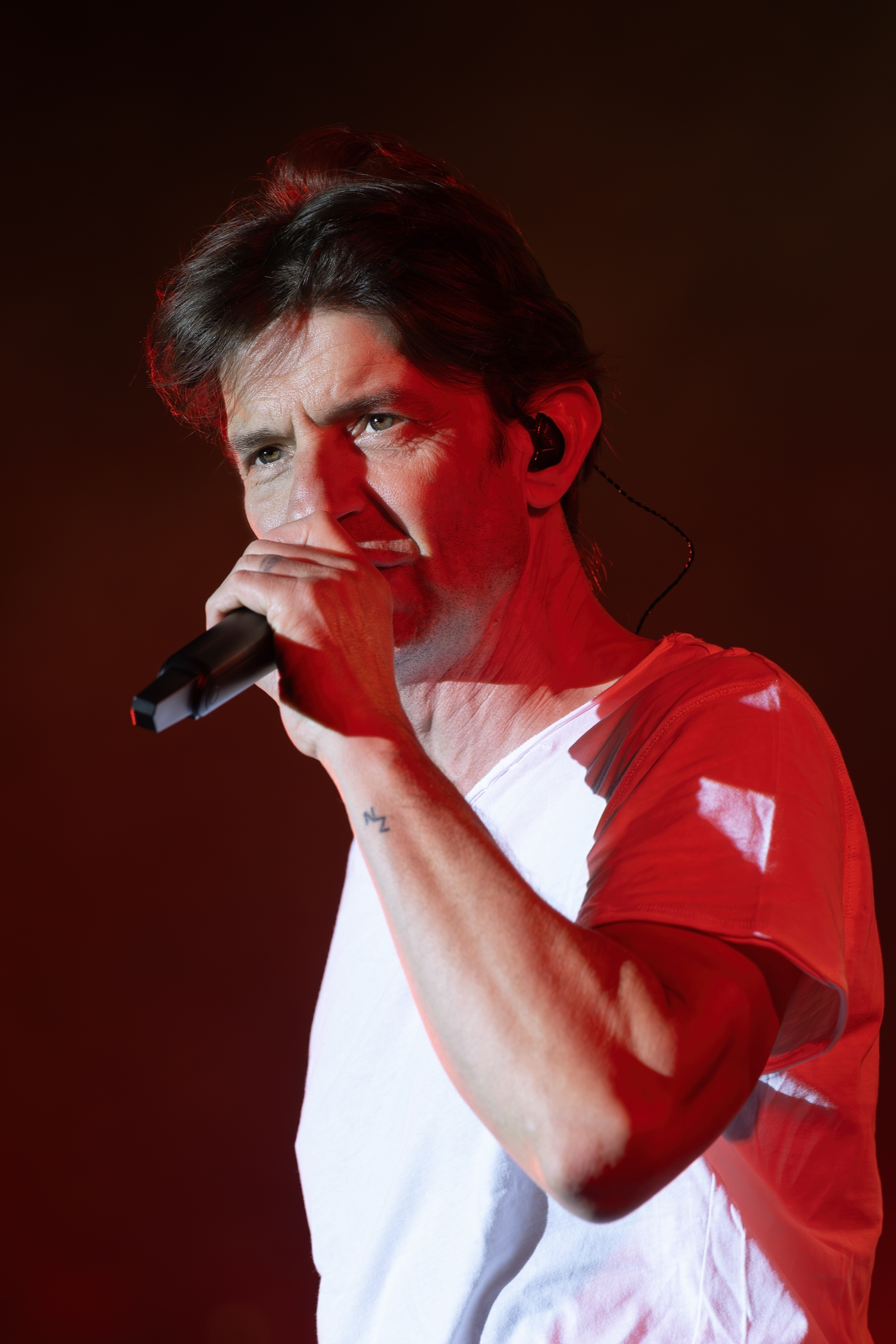
Koen Wauters

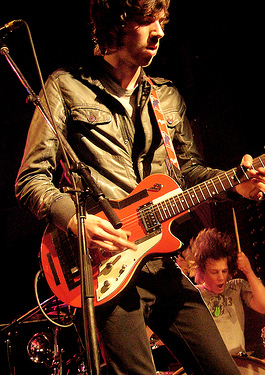
Jan Paternoster

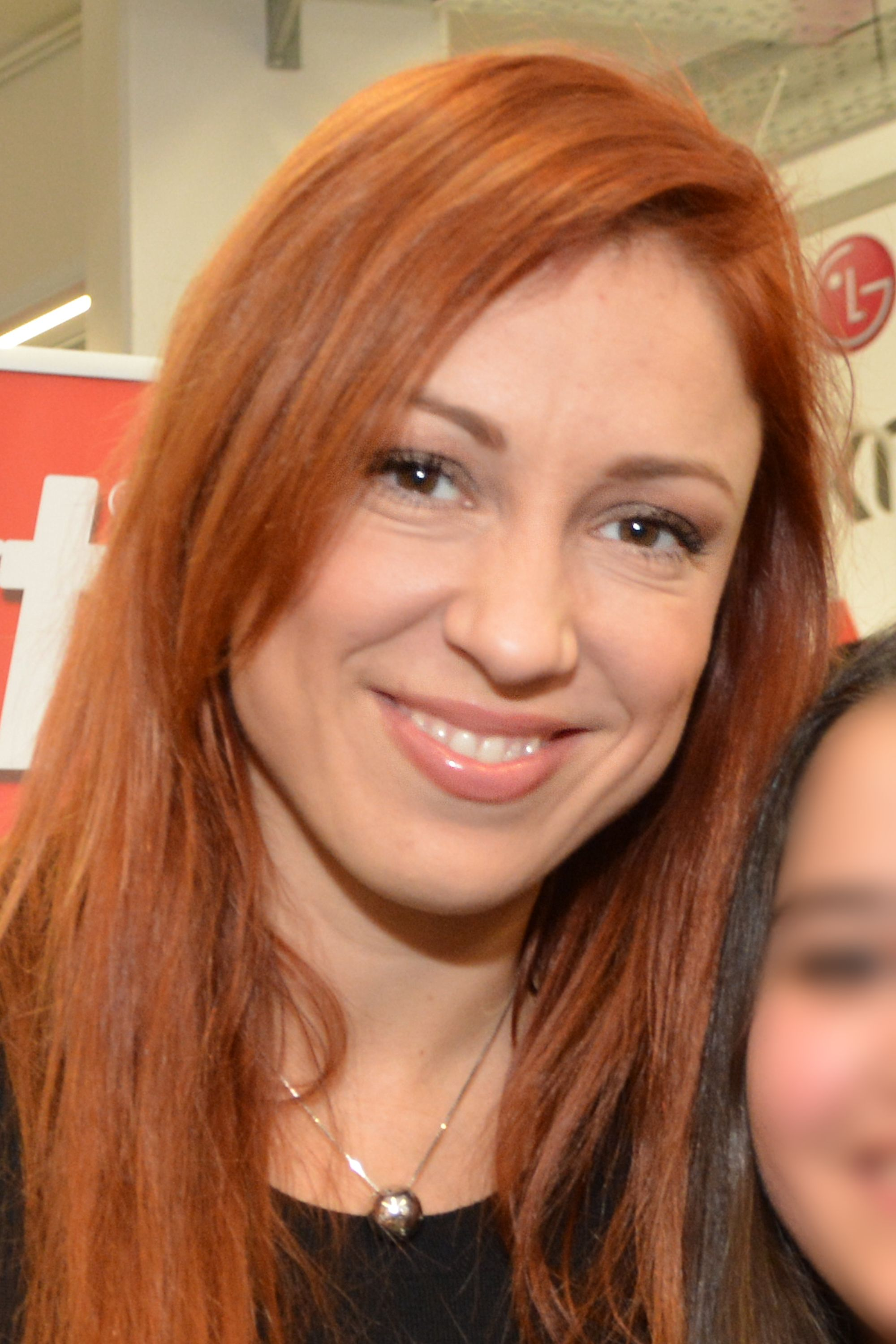
Natalia Druyts

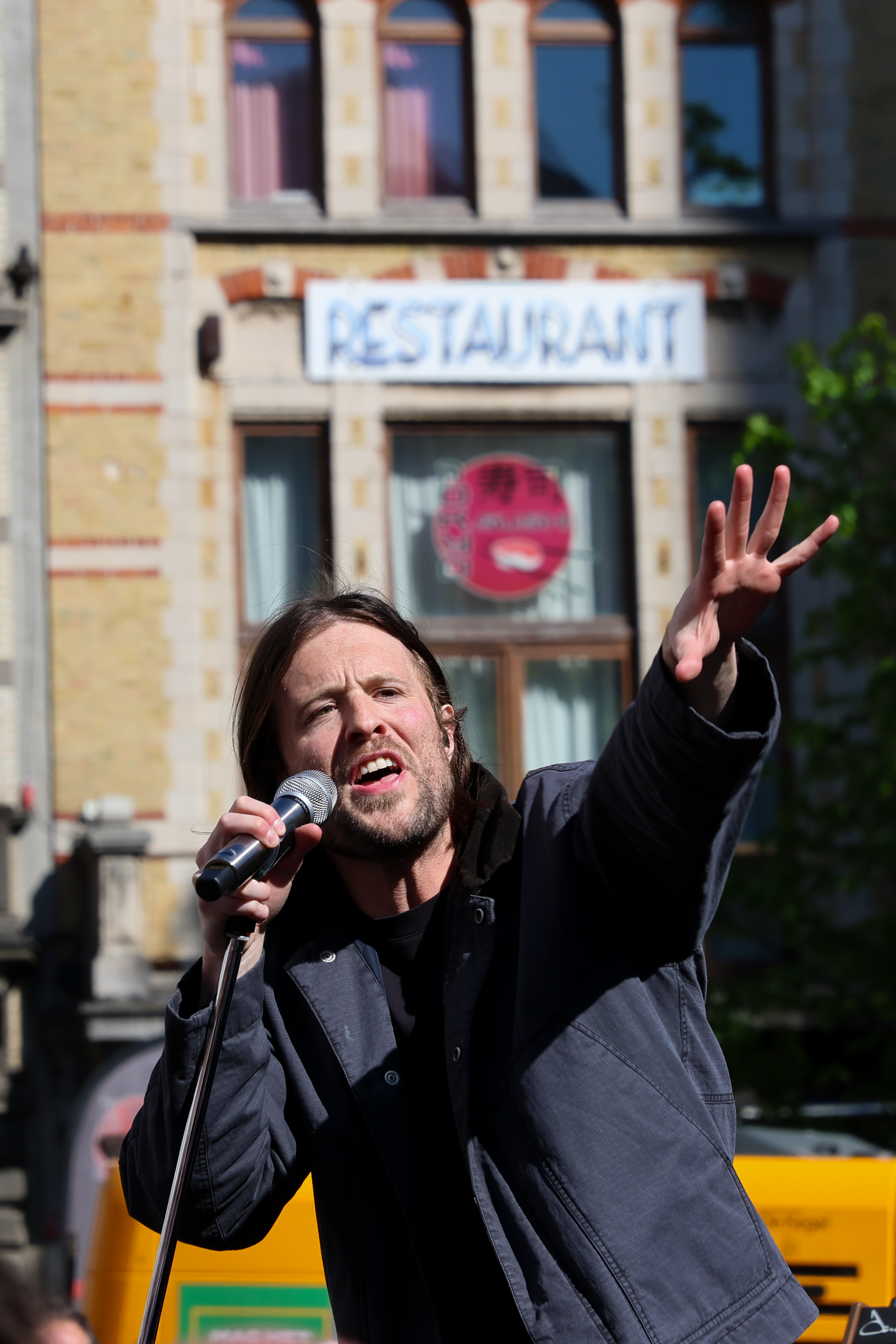
Mathieu Terryn

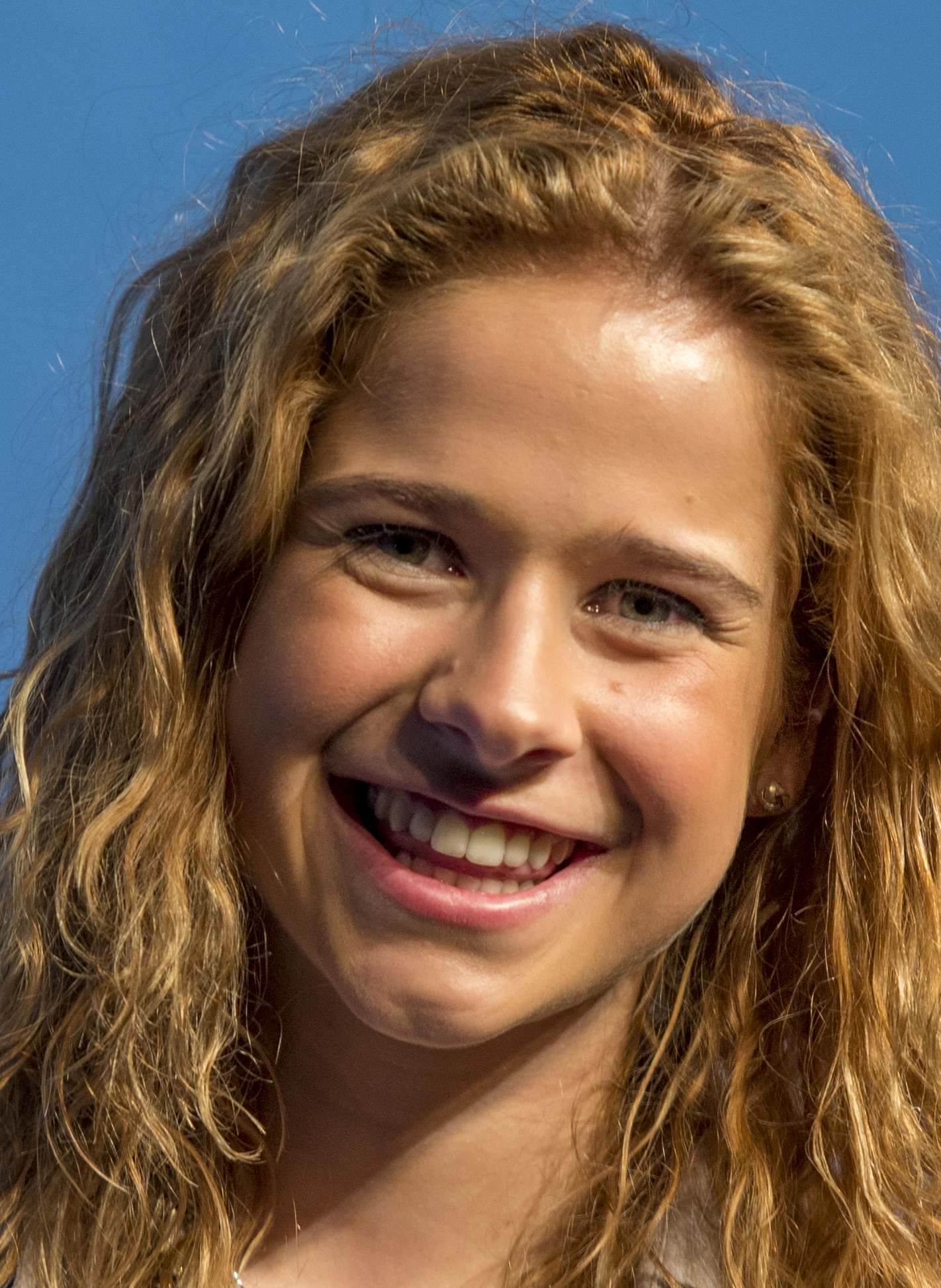
Laura Tesoro

Natalia Druyts, the winning coach of last season, and Koen Wauters returned for their seventh and eighth season, respectively. Jan Paternoster and Mathieu Terryn, who both founded a band of their own where they serve as a vocalist, joined the show as coaches for the first time, replacing Tourist LeMC and Niels Destadsbader. Meanwhile, Laura Tesoro returned for her second season as a coach of the Comeback Stage.

An Lemmens returned for her eighth consecutive season as the host, while Aaron Blommaert replaced Sean Dhondt as the backstage coach of the show. Gloria Monserez presented the show during the knockouts and battles as Lemmens was on maternity leave. When the live shows commenced, she returned to her presenting duties.

== Teams ==
Main competition color key

- Winner
- Runner-up
- Third Place
- Fourth Place
- Fifth Place
- Artist was Eliminated in the Lives
- Artist was Eliminated, but was selected to participate in the Comeback Stage
- Artist was Eliminated in the Battles
- Artist was Eliminated in the Knockouts, but was stolen by another coach
- Artist was Eliminated in Knockouts

Comeback Stage color key

- Eliminated in the Third round
- Eliminated in the Second round
- Eliminated in the First round

Coaches	Top 81 Artists				
Koen Wauters	Johan Callaers	Rosann Kerckhaert	Louise Desmet	Andries Winderickx	Sarah Verdeyen
Koen Wauters	Anna Julia Verstrynge	~~Jochen Sansen~~	~~Matthias Desmet~~	~~Line De Dauw~~	Bram Van Outryve
Koen Wauters	Laura Huysmans	Sara Vandenschrick	Yasmina Jongbloet	Miki Sekulovski	Milan Callens
Jan Paternoster	Wesley Ngoto	Marilou Caudron	Ilaria Coppens	~~Noor Karmaoui~~	Karlien Aelvoet
Jan Paternoster	Jessica Bouhez	~~Anna Julia Verstrynge~~	~~Mayté Gordts~~	~~Roy Silverans~~	Angie-Rachelle Matimboa
Jan Paternoster	Lani Lauwers	Robbe Robbeets	Josse Callens	Jana De Paepe	Celine Van Poppel
Natalia Druyts	Louise Goedefroy	Ruben Katshiame	Julót Van Der Pol	~~Tessa Cornelis~~	Natalya Otsabryk
Natalia Druyts	Maykel López	~~Sonny Sinay~~	Olivier Giambarresi	Laura Duymelinck	Jasmin Mahmood
Natalia Druyts	Klara	Brandon Nsengi	Samuel Wornoo	Cara Matarazzo	Fleur Cottignies
Mathieu Terryn	Evert Dirckx	Yente De Saedeleer	Kaat Neefs	~~Néhémie Katshiame~~	Chiqui Mellaerts
Mathieu Terryn	Jochen Sansen	~~Jessica Bouhez~~	~~Natalya Otsabryk~~	~~Jordy Mertens~~	~~Robbe Verreth~~
Mathieu Terryn	Mieke Vanachter	Louise Van De Vyver	Lisa Lefèvre	Laura Seys	Mauro Van Schaeybroeck
Laura Tesoro	Néhémie Katshiame	Tessa Cornelis	Ashley Feytons	Jordy Mertens	Sonny Sinay
Laura Tesoro	Line De Dauw	Noor Karmaoui	Glen Puylaert	Roy Silverans	Mayté Gordts
Laura Tesoro	Matthias Desmet	Robbe Verreth	Isis Hillé	Rinaldo Hricko	Merel Thys
Laura Tesoro	Antje De Rop	Maxim Librecht	Fien Philipsen	Tahira Van Crombrugghe	Anahit Sahakyan
Laura Tesoro	Sam Mattheeussen				
Note: Italicized names are stolen artists (names struck through within former teams).

== Blind Auditions ==
=== Introduction ===
The Blind Auditions premiered on September 30, 2022. Same as last season, artists who did not get any coach turned around would have the chance to compete in "The Comeback Stage" if selected by the fifth coach Laura Tesoro.

The Blind Auditions this season consist of 10 episodes, with two being broadcast each week.

In total, 83 contestants auditioned this season and 56 of them managed to turn at least one chair. Particularly, a total of 10 artists got a 'four-chair-turn' in this round. 11 artists were selected by the fifth coach Laura Tesoro to compete in "The Comeback Stage". Unfortunately, 23 contestants got eliminated straight away after no coaches turned for them.

=== Notes & Color Keys ===
1. Néhémi (age 23) in the first episode and Ruben (age 19) in the second episode are brothers.
2. In the ninth episode, the contestant Robbe auditioned with the English version of "Denk Maar Niet Aan Morgen", which is a song by Bazart, the band founded by coach Mattieu. Right after Robbe chose to become a member of Team Mattieu, the coach performed the song with him.
3. Joost Zwegers performed the single "Wrong" as a surprise for the coaches, wrapping up the tenth episode as well as the entire round of the Blind Auditions.

Blind auditions color keys
✔	Coach pressed "I WANT YOU" button
	Artist selected a coach's team
	Artist defaulted to a coach's team
	Artist was eliminated and was not invited back for "The Comeback Stage"
	Artist was eliminated, but got a second chance to compete in "The Comeback Stage"
	Artist received a 'four-chair-turn'

=== Blind Auditions Results ===
Episode	Order^{1}	Artist	Song	Coach's and artist's choices			
Episode	Order^{1}	Artist	Song	Koen	Jan	Natalia	Mathieu
Episode 1 (September 30)	1	Louise Desmet	"Lovely"	✔	–	–	–
Episode 1 (September 30)	2	Louise Goedefroy	"A Change Is Gonna Come"	✔	✔	✔	✔
Episode 1 (September 30)	3	Glen Puylaert	"I Wanna Be Your Slave"	–	–	–	–
Episode 1 (September 30)	4	Josse Callens	"Save Me"	–	✔	–	–
Episode 1 (September 30)	5	Fleur De Tarvenier	"What You Don't Do"	–	–	–	–
Episode 1 (September 30)	6	Milan Callens	"No Time to Die"	✔	✔	✔	✔
Episode 1 (September 30)	7	Sophia Esseqqat	"Nutbush City Limits"	–	–	–	–
Episode 1 (September 30)	8	Néhémie Katshiame	"Heartbreak Anniversary"	✔	✔	✔	✔
Episode 2 (October 1)	1	Ruben Katshiame	"Bruises"	✔	✔	✔	✔
Episode 2 (October 1)	2	Amélie Giebels	"Good 4 U"	–	–	–	–
Episode 2 (October 1)	3	Celine Van Poppel	"Door De Wind"	✔	✔	–	–
Episode 2 (October 1)	4	Mauro Van Schaeybroeck	"There's Nothing Holdin' Me Back"	–	–	–	✔
Episode 2 (October 1)	5	Lisa Lefèvre	"S.O.S. to an Angel"	–	–	✔	✔
Episode 2 (October 1)	6	Ine Balthasar	"Without You"	–	–	–	–
Episode 2 (October 1)	7	Maikel López	"537 Cuba"	–	–	✔	–
Episode 2 (October 1)	8	Rosann Kerckhaert	"Altijd Wel Iemand"	✔	–	✔	✔
Episode 2 (October 1)	9	Sam Mattheeussen	"September"	–	–	–	–
Episode 2 (October 1)	10	Anahit Sahakyan	"Hot Stuff"	–	–	–	–
Episode 3 (October 7)	1	Yasmina Jongbloet	"Down Your Eyes"	✔	✔	–	–
Episode 3 (October 7)	2	Lani Lauwers	"I See Fire"	–	✔	–	–
Episode 3 (October 7)	3	Luc Ernst	"Here I Go Again"	–	–	–	–
Episode 3 (October 7)	4	Fleur Cottignies	"What's Up?"	–	–	✔	–
Episode 3 (October 7)	5	Sven De Gendt	"Fall on Me"	–	–	–	–
Episode 3 (October 7)	6	Natalya Otsabryk	"The Wind"	✔	✔	✔	✔
Episode 3 (October 7)	7	Deborah Degryse	"Not an Addict"	–	–	–	–
Episode 3 (October 7)	8	Evert Dirckx	"Wrong"	✔	–	✔	✔
Episode 4 (October 8)	1	Olivier Giambarresi	"Sign of the Times"	–	–	✔	–
Episode 4 (October 8)	2	Zoe Van Gompel	"Remember"	–	–	–	–
Episode 4 (October 8)	3	Cara Matarazzo	"She Used to Be Mine"	–	–	✔	✔
Episode 4 (October 8)	4	Samuel Wornoo	"Set Fire to the Rain"	–	–	✔	–
Episode 4 (October 8)	5	Karlien Aelvoet	"Rooting for You"	–	✔	✔	–
Episode 4 (October 8)	6	Antje De Rop	"Don't Rain on My Parade"	–	–	–	–
Episode 4 (October 8)	7	Johan Callaers	"Are You Gonna Be My Girl"	✔	–	–	–
Episode 4 (October 8)	8	Tahira Van Crombrugghe	"Good Kisser"	–	–	–	–
Episode 4 (October 8)	9	Jochen Sansen	"Rugged Lovers"	✔	✔	✔	✔
Episode 4 (October 8)	10	Maxim Librecht	"Watermelon Sugar"	–	–	–	–
Episode 5 (October 14)	1	Line De Dauw	"Piece by Piece"	✔	–	–	✔
Episode 5 (October 14)	2	Nisrine Berbouche	"Good Woman"	–	–	–	–
Episode 5 (October 14)	3	Wesley Ngoto	"Jar of Hearts"	–	✔	–	–
Episode 5 (October 14)	4	Tessa Cornelis	"Life on Mars"	–	–	✔	–
Episode 5 (October 14)	5	Andries Winderickx	"Where Is My Mind?"	✔	–	–	–
Episode 5 (October 14)	6	Mieke Vanachter	"Bad Liar"	–	✔	✔	✔
Episode 5 (October 14)	7	Jules De Cort	"Riptide"	–	–	–	–
Episode 5 (October 14)	8	Yente De Saedeleer	"Strong"	✔	✔	✔	✔
Episode 6 (October 15)	1	Jana De Paepe	"O Mio Babbino Caro"	–	✔	–	–
Episode 6 (October 15)	2	Matthias Foket	"Roller Coaster"	–	–	–	–
Episode 6 (October 15)	3	Marilou Caudron	"Hope Is a Dangerous Thing for a Woman Like Me to Have"	✔	✔	✔	✔
Episode 6 (October 15)	4	Yanis Driege	"When You Love Someone"	–	–	–	–
Episode 6 (October 15)	5	Sarah Verdeyen	"Never Tear Us Apart"	✔	–	✔	–
Episode 6 (October 15)	6	Fien Philipsen	"Jealous"	–	–	–	–
Episode 6 (October 15)	7	Kaat Neefs	"Wait a Minute"	–	–	–	✔
Episode 6 (October 15)	8	Ilaria Coppens	"The One"	–	✔	✔	✔
Episode 7 (October 21)	1	Klara	"Unstoppable"	✔	–	✔	–
Episode 7 (October 21)	2	Laura Duymelinck	"Bored"	–	–	✔	–
Episode 7 (October 21)	3	Bram Verstappen	"Killer's Mind"	–	–	–	–
Episode 7 (October 21)	4	Griet Samain	"Zeg Me Wie Je Ziet"	–	–	–	–
Episode 7 (October 21)	5	Laura Huysmans	"Onbezonnen"	✔	–	–	–
Episode 7 (October 21)	6	Roy Silverans	"On Call"	✔	✔	✔	–
Episode 7 (October 21)	7	Merel Thys	"Falling"	–	–	–	–
Episode 7 (October 21)	8	Anna-Julia Verstrynge	"Habibi"	–	✔	✔	–
Episode 8 (October 22)	1	Bram Van Outryve	"Never Too Much"	✔	–	–	–
Episode 8 (October 22)	2	Laura Seys	"idontwannabeyouanymore"	–	✔	✔	✔
Episode 8 (October 22)	3	Sara Vandenschrick	"Don't Watch Me Cry"	✔	–	–	–
Episode 8 (October 22)	4	Angie-Rachelle Matimboa	"I'd Rather Go Blind"	–	✔	–	–
Episode 8 (October 22)	5	Robbe Robbeets	"Beggin'"	–	✔	✔	✔
Episode 8 (October 22)	6	Bieke Verstappen	"Vergeet De Tijd"	–	–	–	–
Episode 8 (October 22)	7	Rinaldo Hricko	"Lost in Japan"	–	–	–	–
Episode 8 (October 22)	8	Chiqui Mellaerts	"There Are Worse Things I Could Do"	–	–	–	✔
Episode 8 (October 22)	9	Sonny Sinay	"All By Myself"	✔	✔	✔	✔
Episode 9 (October 28)	1	Louise Van De Vyver	"You Lost Me"	–	–	–	✔
Episode 9 (October 28)	2	Isis Hillé	"Best Part"	–	–	–	–
Episode 9 (October 28)	3	Matthias Desmet	"Save Your Tears"	✔	–	–	–
Episode 9 (October 28)	4	Robbe Verreth	"Denk Maar Niet Aan Morgen"	–	–	✔	✔
Episode 9 (October 28)	5	Manno Hulselmans	"Warrior"	–	–	–	–
Episode 9 (October 28)	6	Brandon Nsengi	"Maria Maria"	–	✔	✔	✔
Episode 9 (October 28)	7	Swell Sieben	"That Look You Give That Guy" and "Coup de soleil"	–	–	–	–
Episode 9 (October 28)	8	Mayté Gordts	"Reckless"	–	✔	–	–
Episode 10 (October 29)	1	Jordy Mertens	"You Are the Reason"	–	✔	–	✔
Episode 10 (October 29)	2	Karo Voets	"Amsterdam"	–	–	–	–
Episode 10 (October 29)	3	Jessica Bouhez	"Issues"	✔	✔	✔	✔
Episode 10 (October 29)	4	Julót Van Der Pol	"Don't Know Why"	–	–	✔	Team Full
Episode 10 (October 29)	5	Ashley Feytons	"Circles"	–	–	–	Team Full
Episode 10 (October 29)	6	Miki Sekulovski	"Angels"	✔	–	–	Team Full
Episode 10 (October 29)	7	Noor Karmaoui	"On My Mind"	Team Full	✔	✔	Team Full
Episode 10 (October 29)	8	Jasmin Mahmood	"Crazy"	Team Full	Team Full	✔	Team Full

== Knockouts ==
This season, the show continued its twist on the original rules, switching the Knockouts and the Battles. During the Knockouts and the Battles, host An Lemmens took a break for maternity while Gloria Monserez joined Aaron Blommaert to host the show.

In the Knockouts, the artists in each team choose their own song to sing. After their performance, the coaches will have to decide whether to eliminate the artist straight away or put the artist in the 'Redzone' for further results, or to advance immediately.

The show introduced the 'Redzone' where contestants not guaranteed to advance to the next round wait for their coach's final decision. A maximum of three artists can end up in the 'Redzone' and the coach can choose only one of them to advance to the Battles. However, before an artist ends up in the 'Redzone', the other coaches first get the chance to use the one and only 'Steal' to secure the artist a spot on their team. If more than one coach presses their button to steal the artist, the artist in turn has the chance to choose a coach's team to advance.

Artists who were not chosen at the end of this round will have the chance to compete in "The Comeback Stage" if selected by the fifth coach Laura Tesoro.

Knockouts color keys
Artist immediately advanced to the battle
Artist was put into the "Redzone" and advanced to the battle
Artist was stolen by another coach and advanced to the battle
Artist was eliminated but was chosen to compete in the "Comeback Stage"
Artist was put into the "Redzone" but was eliminated in the final decision
Artist was immediately eliminated

Knockouts Results
Episode	Coach	Order	Artist	Song	Coach's and artist's choices			
Episode	Coach	Order	Artist	Song	Koen	Jan	Natalia	Mathieu
Episode 11 (November 5)	Mathieu Terryn	1	Mieke Vanachter	"I Don't Wanna Lose Your Love"	–	–	–	N/A
Episode 11 (November 5)	Mathieu Terryn	2	Mauro Van Schaeybroeck	"I Wanna Dance with Somebody"	–	–	–	N/A
Episode 11 (November 5)	Koen Wauters	3	Milan Callens	"Royals"	N/A	–	–	–
Episode 11 (November 5)	Koen Wauters	4	Andries Winderickx	"Fell on Back Days"	N/A	–	–	–
Episode 11 (November 5)	Natalia Druyts	5	Fleur Cottignies	"Complicated"	–	–	N/A	–
Episode 11 (November 5)	Natalia Druyts	6	Cara Matarazzo	"Somebody to Love"	–	–	N/A	–
Episode 11 (November 5)	Natalia Druyts	7	Louise Goedefroy	"Iron Sky"	N/A	N/A	N/A	N/A
Episode 11 (November 5)	Jan Paternoster	8	Celine Van Poppel	"Meisje van Honing"	–	N/A	–	–
Episode 11 (November 5)	Mathieu Terryn	9	Robbe Verreth	"Break My Heart Again"	–	–	–	N/A
Episode 11 (November 5)	Mathieu Terryn	10	Chiqui Mellaerts	"Forfeit."	–	–	–	N/A
Episode 11 (November 5)	Jan Paternoster	11	Jana De Paepe	"Amazing Grace"	–	N/A	–	–
Episode 11 (November 5)	Jan Paternoster	12	Noor Karmaoui	"Catalina"	N/A	N/A	N/A	N/A
Episode 11 (November 5)	Mathieu Terryn	13	Jordy Mertens	"Run"	–	–	–	N/A
Episode 11 (November 5)	Mathieu Terryn	14	Laura Seys	"Settle Down"	–	–	–	N/A
Episode 11 (November 5)	Mathieu Terryn	15	Néhémie Katshiame	"Make It Rain"	N/A	N/A	N/A	N/A
Episode 12 (November 6)	Jan Paternoster	1	Roy Silverans	"I Can't Go on Without You"	–	N/A	–	–
Episode 12 (November 6)	Jan Paternoster	2	Josse Callens	"Lost in the Moment"	–	N/A	–	–
Episode 12 (November 6)	Mathieu Terryn	3	Lisa Lefèvre	"Teardrop"	–	–	–	N/A
Episode 12 (November 6)	Mathieu Terryn	4	Natalya Otsabryk	"You Had Me"	–	–	✔	N/A
Episode 12 (November 6)	Koen Wauters	5	Louise Desmet	"Lover, Please Stay"	N/A	N/A	Steal used	N/A
Episode 12 (November 6)	Koen Wauters	6	Miki Sekulovski	"Cold"	N/A	–	Steal used	–
Episode 12 (November 6)	Mathieu Terryn	7	Louise Van De Vyver	"Nightmares"	–	–	Steal used	N/A
Episode 12 (November 6)	Mathieu Terryn	8	Kaat Neefs	"Mother's Last Words to Her Son"	N/A	N/A	Steal used	N/A
Episode 12 (November 6)	Natalia Druyts	9	Olivier Giambarresi	"Loca"	–	N/A	Steal used	–
Episode 12 (November 6)	Natalia Druyts	10	Sonny Sinay	"Saving All My Love for You"	–	N/A	Steal used	–
Episode 12 (November 6)	Koen Wauters	11	Line De Dauw	"Almost Is Never Enough"	N/A	–	Steal used	–
Episode 12 (November 6)	Koen Wauters	12	Yasmina Jongbloet	"You Say"	N/A	–	Steal used	–
Episode 12 (November 6)	Mathieu Terryn	13	Yente De Saedeleer	"Walking on Sunshine"	N/A	N/A	Steal used	N/A
Episode 12 (November 6)	Mathieu Terryn	14	Jessica Bouhez	"God Must Have Me"	✔	✔	Steal used	N/A
Episode 12 (November 6)	Mathieu Terryn	15	Evert Dirckx	"Bad Habit"	N/A	Steal used	Steal used	N/A
Episode 13 (November 12)	Koen Wauters	1	Bram Van Outryve	"Alright"	N/A	Steal used	Steal used	–
Episode 13 (November 12)	Koen Wauters	2	Jochen Sansen	"The Best Is Yet to Come"	N/A	Steal used	Steal used	✔
Episode 13 (November 12)	Natalia Druyts	3	Samuel Wornoo	"Stop This Flame"	–	Steal used	Steal used	Steal used
Episode 13 (November 12)	Koen Wauters	4	Rosann Kerckhaert	"Liefde van Later"	N/A	Steal used	Steal used	Steal used
Episode 13 (November 12)	Koen Wauters	5	Sara Vandenschrick	"Lay Me Down"	N/A	Steal used	Steal used	Steal used
Episode 13 (November 12)	Jan Paternoster	6	Ilaria Coppens	"Learn to Speak"	N/A	Steal used	Steal used	Steal used
Episode 13 (November 12)	Jan Paternoster	7	Robbe Robbeets	"Without You"	–	Steal used	Steal used	Steal used
Episode 13 (November 12)	Natalia Druyts	8	Brandon Nsengi	"Swim Good"	–	Steal used	Steal used	Steal used
Episode 13 (November 12)	Koen Wauters	9	Laura Huysmans	"Vol"	N/A	Steal used	Steal used	Steal used
Episode 13 (November 12)	Koen Wauters	10	Matthias Desmet	"Three Little Birds"	N/A	Steal used	Steal used	Steal used
Episode 13 (November 12)	Jan Paternoster	11	Anna Julia Verstrynge	"If You Go Away"	✔	Steal used	Steal used	Steal used
Episode 13 (November 12)	Koen Wauters	12	Sarah Verdeyen	"Out of the Black"	Steal used	Steal used	Steal used	Steal used
Episode 13 (November 12)	Koen Wauters	13	Johan Callaers	"Little Black Submarine"	Steal used	Steal used	Steal used	Steal used
Episode 14 (November 13)	Natalia Druyts	1	Ruben Katshiame	"Tennessee Whiskey"	Steal used	Steal used	Steal used	Steal used
Episode 14 (November 13)	Natalia Druyts	2	Klara	"Nakamarra"	Steal used	Steal used	Steal used	Steal used
Episode 14 (November 13)	Jan Paternoster	3	Lani Lauwers	"Shot in The Dark"	Steal used	Steal used	Steal used	Steal used
Episode 14 (November 13)	Natalia Druyts	4	Julót Van Der Pol	"Gravity"	Steal used	Steal used	Steal used	Steal used
Episode 14 (November 13)	Natalia Druyts	5	Jasmin Mahmood	"One Last Time"	Steal used	Steal used	Steal used	Steal used
Episode 14 (November 13)	Jan Paternoster	6	Wesley Ngoto	"Unshaken"	Steal used	Steal used	Steal used	Steal used
Episode 14 (November 13)	Jan Paternoster	7	Mayté Gordts	"she's all I wanna be"	Steal used	Steal used	Steal used	Steal used
Episode 14 (November 13)	Natalia Druyts	8	Tessa Cornelis	"Changing"	Steal used	Steal used	Steal used	Steal used
Episode 14 (November 13)	Natalia Druyts	9	Laura Duymelinck	"Wish I Didn't Miss You"	Steal used	Steal used	Steal used	Steal used
Episode 14 (November 13)	Natalia Druyts	10	Maykel López	"El Perdón"	Steal used	Steal used	Steal used	Steal used
Episode 14 (November 13)	Jan Paternoster	11	Karlien Aelvoet	"Big in Japan"	Steal used	Steal used	Steal used	Steal used
Episode 14 (November 13)	Jan Paternoster	12	Angie-Rachelle Matimboa	"Dangerous Woman"	Steal used	Steal used	Steal used	Steal used
Episode 14 (November 13)	Jan Paternoster	13	Marilou Caudron	"Selfless"	Steal used	Steal used	Steal used	Steal used

== Battles ==
In this round, the coaches pair their artists for a singing match of two where they are given a song to sing together. The coaches then decide which of the two artists advance to the Live Shows. Artists who were not chosen at the end of this round will have the chance to compete in "The Comeback Stage" if selected by the fifth coach Laura Tesoro.

Battles color key
Artist won the Battle and advanced to the Live Shows
Artist lost the Battle but was selected to compete in "The Comeback Stage"
Artist lost the Battle and was eliminated

Battles Results
Episode	Coach	Order	Winner	Song	Loser
Episode 15 (November 19)	Koen Wauters	1	Louise Desmet	"Nothing New"	Anna Julia Verstrynge
Episode 15 (November 19)	Mathieu Terryn	2	Kaat Neefs	"July"	Néhémie Katshiame
Episode 15 (November 19)	Natalia Druyts	3	Ruben Katshiame	"Sorry"	Maykel López
Episode 15 (November 19)	Jan Paternoster	4	Ilaria Coppens	"Many Shades of Black"	Jessica Bouhez
Episode 15 (November 19)	Natalia Druyts	5	Louise Goedefroy	"Fingers Crossed"	Tessa Cornelis
Episode 15 (November 19)	Koen Wauters	6	Johan Callaers	"Candy"	Sarah Verdeyen
Episode 16 (November 20)	Jan Paternoster	1	Wesley Ngoto	"One of These Nights"	Karlien Aelvoet
Episode 16 (November 20)	Koen Wauters	2	Rosann Kerckhaert	"Rigoureus"	Andries Winderickx
Episode 16 (November 20)	Mathieu Terryn	3	Yente De Saedeleer	"The Time Is Now"	Chiqui Mellaerts
Episode 16 (November 20)	Jan Paternoster	4	Marilou Caudron	"Dream a Little Dream of Me"	Noor Karmaoui
Episode 16 (November 20)	Natalia Druyts	5	Julót Van Der Pol	"Ghost Town"	Natalya Otsabryk
Episode 16 (November 20)	Mathieu Terryn	6	Evert Dirckx	"Seventeen Going Under"	Jochen Sansen

== The Comeback Stage ==
The show continued to feature "The Comeback Stage" where contestants who were eliminated from each round but were chosen by the fifth coach Laura Tesoro compete for extra spots for the Lives.

=== Round 1: Auditions ===
The 11 artists who did not get any coach turned in the Blind Auditions but were selected by Laura competed in this round. Only two artists will advance to the next round. However, in the last episode of the Auditions (Episode 10), Laura decided to break the rules and take three artists to the next round. The three artists advanced to the next round are Glen Puylaert, Isis Hillé, and Ashley Feytons.

Round 1: Auditions Performances & Results
Episode	Order	Artist	Song	Results	Switched with
Episode 1 & 2 (September 30)	1	Sam Mattheeussen	"Before You Go"	Eliminated	N/A
Episode 1 & 2 (September 30)	2	Glen Puylaert	"Human"	Advanced	N/A
Episode 1 & 2 (September 30)	3	Anahit Sahakyan	"Still Rolling Stones"	Eliminated	Sam Mattheeussen
Episode 3 & 4 (October 1)	1	Antje De Rop	"My Mind"	Eliminated	Anahit Sahakyan
Episode 3 & 4 (October 1)	2	Tahira Van Crombrugghe	"Daddy Lessons"	Eliminated	—
Episode 5 & 6 (October 7)	1	Fien Philipsen	"Hearts Ain't Gonna Lie"	Eliminated	—
Episode 5 & 6 (October 7)	2	Maxim Librecht	"Wheels"	Eliminated	—
Episode 7 (October 8)	1	Rinaldo Hricko	"How Deep Is Your Love"	Eliminated	Antje De Rop
Episode 8 (October 14)	1	Merel Thys	"I Put a Spell on You" (Annie Lennox version)	Eliminated	—
Episode 9 (October 15)	1	Isis Hillé	"Masterpiece"	Advanced	Rinaldo Hricko
Episode 10 (October 21)	1	Ashley Feytons	"Right Now"	Advanced	—

=== Round 2: Knockouts ===
The three artists advanced from the Auditions and the seven artists who were eliminated by the other four coaches in the Knockouts will compete in this round for spots in the Battles for "The Comeback Stage".

Round 2: Knockouts Performances & Results
Episode	Order	Artist	Song	Results
Episode 11 & 12 (October 22)	1	Jordy Mertens	"drivers license"	Advanced
Episode 11 & 12 (October 22)	2	Isis Hillé	"Love on the Brain"	Eliminated
Episode 13 & 14 (October 28)	1	Robbe Verreth	"Little Monster"	Eliminated
Episode 13 & 14 (October 28)	2	Glen Puylaert	"Grace"	Advanced
Episode 15 & 16 (October 29)	1	Line De Dauw	"Almost There"	Advanced
Episode 15 & 16 (October 29)	2	Matthias Desmet	"A Sky Full of Stars"	Eliminated
Episode 17 (November 5)	1	Mayté Gordts	"Birthday Cake"	Eliminated
Episode 17 (November 5)	2	Ashley Feytons	"Easy on Me"	Advanced
Episode 18 (November 6)	1	Roy Silverans	"Proud Mary"	Eliminated
Episode 18 (November 6)	2	Sonny Sinay	"The Show Must Go On"	Advanced

=== Round 3: Battles ===
The five artists advanced from the Knockouts and the three artists who were eliminated by the other four coaches in the Battles will compete in this round for spots in the Lives. According to the rules, Laura has to choose two artists to advance to the Lives while the other two artists have to compete for the final spot by performing at the radio station Qmusic.

In episode 20, after Jordy and Sonny performed, Laura wanted to pair the two contestants and make a duo but was refused by the two artists. Laura chose not to make a decision and let the people listening to radio station Qmusic decide.

Round 3: Battles Performances & Results
Episode	Winner	Song	Loser
Episode 19 (November 12)	Néhémie Katshiame	"Not the Same"	Glen Puylaert
Episode 20 (November 13)	Jordy Mertens	"Electric Life"	N/A
Episode 20 (November 13)	Sonny Sinay	"Electric Life"	N/A
Episode 21 (November 19)	Tessa Cornelis	"Bed I Made"	Noor Karmaoui
Episode 22 (November 20)	Ashley Feytons	"Minefields"	Line De Dauw

=== Extra Round: Radio @Qmusic ===
After the Battles, five contestants were left. Laura had to choose two of them to go straight to the Live Rounds, they were Ashley and Néhémie. The other three contestants had to perform at a radio station (Qmusic) to fight for the last spot in the Live Rounds.

Episode	Order	Artist	Song	Results
Qmusic(November 28)	1	Jordy Mertens	"You Are the Reason"	Eliminated
Qmusic(November 28)	2	Sonny Sinay	"All by Myself" (Céline Dion version)	Eliminated
Qmusic(November 28)	3	Tessa Cornelis	"Life on Mars?"	Advanced

== Lives ==
The Lives comprise four weeks of performances, where 15 artists advanced from previous round compete for the final five spots in the finale and the opportunity to win this entire season.

The initial host An Lemmens returned to host the Lives after her hiatus in the Knockouts and the Battles where Gloria Monserez hosted the show alongside Aaron Blommaert.

=== Week 1: Top 15 ===
The 12 contestants, 3 per team, advanced from the Battles and the 3 contestants from "The Comeback Stage" who secured the spots of the Lives will have to compete to advance to the next week's Live show. For each team, the coach can only choose two artists out of three to advance. Artists who were not chosen will be eliminated.

Episode	Coach	Order	Artist	Song	Results
Episode 17 (December 2)	Laura Tesoro	1	Ashley Feytons	"Warrior" by Oscar and the Wolf	Eliminated
Episode 17 (December 2)	Laura Tesoro	2	Tessa Cornelis	"Love in the Dark"	Advanced
Episode 17 (December 2)	Laura Tesoro	3	Néhémie Katshiame	"Cry Me a River"	Advanced
Episode 17 (December 2)	Jan Paternoster	4	Marilou Caudron	"No One Knows"	Advanced
Episode 17 (December 2)	Jan Paternoster	5	Wesley Ngoto	"Suspicious Minds"	Advanced
Episode 17 (December 2)	Jan Paternoster	6	Ilaria Coppens	"Snap"	Eliminated
Episode 17 (December 2)	Mathieu Terryn	7	Evert Dirckx	"Gran Torino" by Jamie Cullum	Advanced
Episode 17 (December 2)	Mathieu Terryn	8	Kaat Neefs	"Forget Me"	Eliminated
Episode 17 (December 2)	Mathieu Terryn	9	Yente De Saedeleer	"Liability"	Advanced
Episode 17 (December 2)	Natalia Druyts	10	Ruben Katshiame	"When I Was Your Man"	Advanced
Episode 17 (December 2)	Natalia Druyts	11	Julót Van Der Pol	"Love Me Now"	Eliminated
Episode 17 (December 2)	Natalia Druyts	12	Louise Goedefroy	"Believe"	Advanced
Episode 17 (December 2)	Koen Wauters	13	Rosann Kerckhaert	"Dat Heb Jij Gedaan" by Meau	Advanced
Episode 17 (December 2)	Koen Wauters	14	Johan Callaers	"Set Fire to the Rain"	Advanced
Episode 17 (December 2)	Koen Wauters	15	Louise Desmet	"Running Up That Hill"	Eliminated

=== Week 2: Top 10 ===
The remaining ten artists will have to compete for seven spots in the Semi-Final. For each team, after the performances of the two artists, the coach first chooses one artist to advance to the Semi-Final. The other artist will have to wait for the public to decide whether they will advance. Only two out of the five artists that were not chosen by their coach who received the highest votes from the public will advance.

Week 2: Top 10 Performances & Results
Episode	Coach	Order	Artist	Song	Results
Episode 18 (December 9)	Natalia Druyts	1	Ruben Katshiame	"Georgy Porgy"	Eliminated
Episode 18 (December 9)	Natalia Druyts	2	Louise Goedefroy	"In The Stars"	Coach's Choice
Episode 18 (December 9)	Koen Wauters	3	Johan Callaers	"Nothing Else Matters"	Public's Vote
Episode 18 (December 9)	Koen Wauters	4	Rosann Kerckhaert	"Creep" (Dutch version)	Coach's Choice
Episode 18 (December 9)	Laura Tesoro	5	Tessa Cornelis	"Afterglow"	Eliminated
Episode 18 (December 9)	Laura Tesoro	6	Néhémie Katshiame	"Lift Me Up"	Coach's Choice
Episode 18 (December 9)	Jan Paternoster	7	Marilou Caudron	"Little Lies"	Eliminated
Episode 18 (December 9)	Jan Paternoster	8	Wesley Ngoto	"Loyalty"	Coach's Choice
Episode 18 (December 9)	Mathieu Terryn	9	Yente De Saedeleer	"I Kissed a Girl"	Public's Vote
Episode 18 (December 9)	Mathieu Terryn	10	Evert Dirckx	"Somebody to Love"	Coach's Choice

=== Week 3: Semi-Final (Top 7) ===
The Semi-Final aired on December 16. In the Semi-Final, the remaining seven artists will have to compete for the final five spots to advance to the Grand Final, regardless of what team they are on.

With the advancements of Evert Dirckx, Yente De Saedeleer and Wesley Ngoto, Mathieu Terryn and Jan Paternoster became the sixth and seventh new coaches to successfully bring their team to the finale after Bent Van Looy (Tom De Man in season 3), Axelle Red (Koen en Jo Smets in season 3), Regi Penxten (Dunja Meesin in season 3), Bart Peeters (Jan Van De Ven in season 4) and Niels Destadsbader (Nanou Nys in season 7). Additionally, Terryn became the only new coach to have multiple artists represent them in the finale. With the elimination of Néhémie from Team Laura, this is the second consecutive time that Laura Tesoro as the coach for "The Comeback Stage" has no artists representing her in the Final.

Week 3: Semi-Final Performances & Results
Episode	Coach	Artist	Order	Solo	Order	Duet with Coach	Results
Episode 19 (December 16)	Jan Paternoster	Wesley Ngoto	1	"Stand by Me"	12	"Wild Things"	Advanced
Episode 19 (December 16)	Laura Tesoro	Néhémie Katshiame	2	"Say My Name"	7	"Cuff It"	Eliminated
Episode 19 (December 16)	Mathieu Terryn	Evert Dirckx	4	"If I Ain't Got You"	11	"Kronenburg Park"	Advanced
Episode 19 (December 16)	Koen Wauters	Johan Callaers	6	"Angels Like You"	8	"You're a Friend of Mine"	Advanced
Episode 19 (December 16)	Mathieu Terryn	Yente De Saedeleer	9	"Strange"	5	"Watermelon Sugar"	Advanced
Episode 19 (December 16)	Natalia Druyts	Louise Goedefroy	10	"Crazy"	14	"There Must Be an Angel"	Advanced
Episode 19 (December 16)	Koen Wauters	Rosann Kerckhaert	13	"Porselein"	3	"Somewhere Only We Know" (Dutch version)	Eliminated

=== Week 4: Grand Final (Top 5) ===
In the Grand Final, the five finalists of coaches Koen, Mathieu, Jan and Natalia will each perform one new solo song in Phase 1. Then the public chooses their three top finalists advancing to the second phase, eliminating the two artists with the fewest votes. The remaining three finalists will have to choose a song that they have performed in the previous rounds of this season to sing in the second phase. In the end, the contestant with the most votes in the second Phase will be crowned the winner of this season.

The five finalists performed the Miley Cyrus version of the classic Christmas song "Last Christmas" after they finished their performances in the first phase of the Grand Final, before the three finalists moving on to the next and last phase was revealed.

Louise Goedefroy representing coach Natalia Druyts was crowned the winner of this season, marking her coach's second consecutive win.

Week 4: Grand Final Performances & Results
Episode	Coach	Artist	Phase 1		Phase 2		Results
Episode	Coach	Artist	Order	Song	Order	Song	Results
Episode 20 (December 23)	Koen Wauters	Johan Callaers	1	"Beautiful Day"	6	"Nothing Else Matters"	Runner-up
Episode 20 (December 23)	Mathieu Terryn	Yente De Saedeleer	2	"Vienna"	Eliminated in Phase 1		Fifth Place
Episode 20 (December 23)	Jan Paternoster	Wesley Ngoto	3	"Hey Brother"	Eliminated in Phase 1		Fourth Place
Episode 20 (December 23)	Natalia Druyts	Louise Goedefroy	4	"I Will Survive"	7	"Crazy"	Winner
Episode 20 (December 23)	Mathieu Terryn	Evert Dirckx	5	"Half a Man"	8	"Bad Habit"	Third Place

== Elimination chart ==
Results color key
Winner	Saved by the public
Runner-up	Saved by their coach
Third place	Saved by the public after not chosen by their coach
Fourth place	Eliminated
Fifth place

Coaches color key
Team Koen
Team Jan
Team Natalia
Team Mathieu
Team Laura

=== Overall ===
Live shows' results per week
Artists	Week 1	Week 2	Week 3	Week 4 Finale	
Artists	Week 1	Week 2	Week 3	Phase 1	Phase 2
Louise Goedefroy	Safe	Safe	Safe	Safe	Winner
Johan Callaers	Safe	Safe	Safe	Safe	Runner-up
Evert Dirckx	Safe	Safe	Safe	Safe	3rd place
Wesley Ngoto	Safe	Safe	Safe	4th place	Eliminated (Week 4)
Yente De Saedeleer	Safe	Safe	Safe	5th place	Eliminated (Week 4)
Néhémie Katshiame	Safe	Safe	Eliminated	Eliminated (Week 3)	
Rosann Kerckhaert	Safe	Safe	Eliminated	Eliminated (Week 3)	
Marilou Caudron	Safe	Eliminated	Eliminated (Week 2)		
Ruben Katshiame	Safe	Eliminated	Eliminated (Week 2)		
Tessa Cornelis	Safe	Eliminated	Eliminated (Week 2)		
Ashley Feytons	Eliminated	Eliminated (Week 1)			
Ilaria Coppens	Eliminated	Eliminated (Week 1)			
Julót Van Der Pol	Eliminated	Eliminated (Week 1)			
Kaat Neefs	Eliminated	Eliminated (Week 1)			
Louise Desmet	Eliminated	Eliminated (Week 1)			

=== Per team ===
Live shows' results per week
Artists	Week 1	Week 2	Week 3	Week 4 Finale	
Artists	Week 1	Week 2	Week 3	Phase 1	Phase 2
Johan Callaers	Safe	Safe	Safe	Safe	Runner-up
Rosann Kerckhaert	Safe	Safe	Eliminated		
Louise Desmet	Eliminated				
Wesley Ngoto	Safe	Safe	Safe	4th place	
Marilou Caudron	Safe	Eliminated			
Ilaria Coppens	Eliminated				
Louise Goedefroy	Safe	Safe	Safe	Safe	Winner
Ruben Katshiame	Safe	Eliminated			
Julót Van Der Pol	Eliminated				
Evert Dirckx	Safe	Safe	Safe	Safe	3rd place
Yente De Saedeleer	Safe	Safe	Safe	5th place	
Kaat Neefs	Eliminated				
Néhémie Katshiame	Safe	Safe	Eliminated		
Tessa Cornelis	Safe	Eliminated			
Ashley Feytons	Eliminated				
