= Willy Sommers =

Belgian singer and television presenter

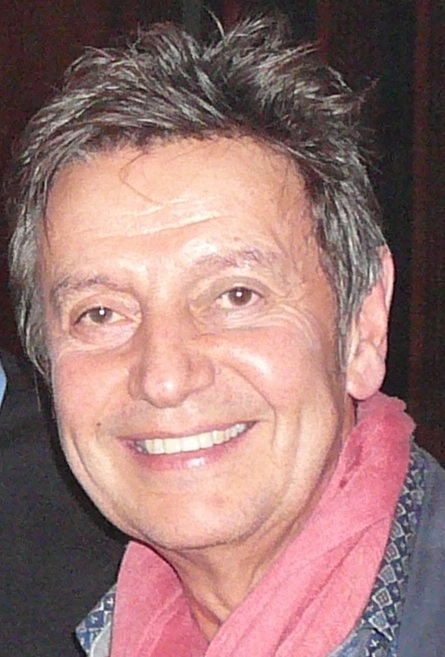
Sommers in 2013

Willy Sommers (born Willy Jeanne Jean De Gieter in Uccle, Belgium on 9 August 1952) is a Flemish singer and television presenter. He sings Schlager music and is described as an "unsophisticated crooner". His hits include "Zeven Anjers Zeven Rozen" (meaning Seven Carnations, Seven Roses), a hit in Dutch in 1971 which, translated as "Siete rosas, Siete besos" (meaning Seven Roses, Seven Kisses), spent 34 weeks in the Spanish Top 50. Sommers had a relationship in the 1970s with singer Truus (real name Gertrudis Vereecken).

Sommers appeared as himself in episode 9 of season 2 (Reconstructie) of the Netflix production Undercover.
