= Margriet Hermans =

Belgian politician and singer (1954–2026)

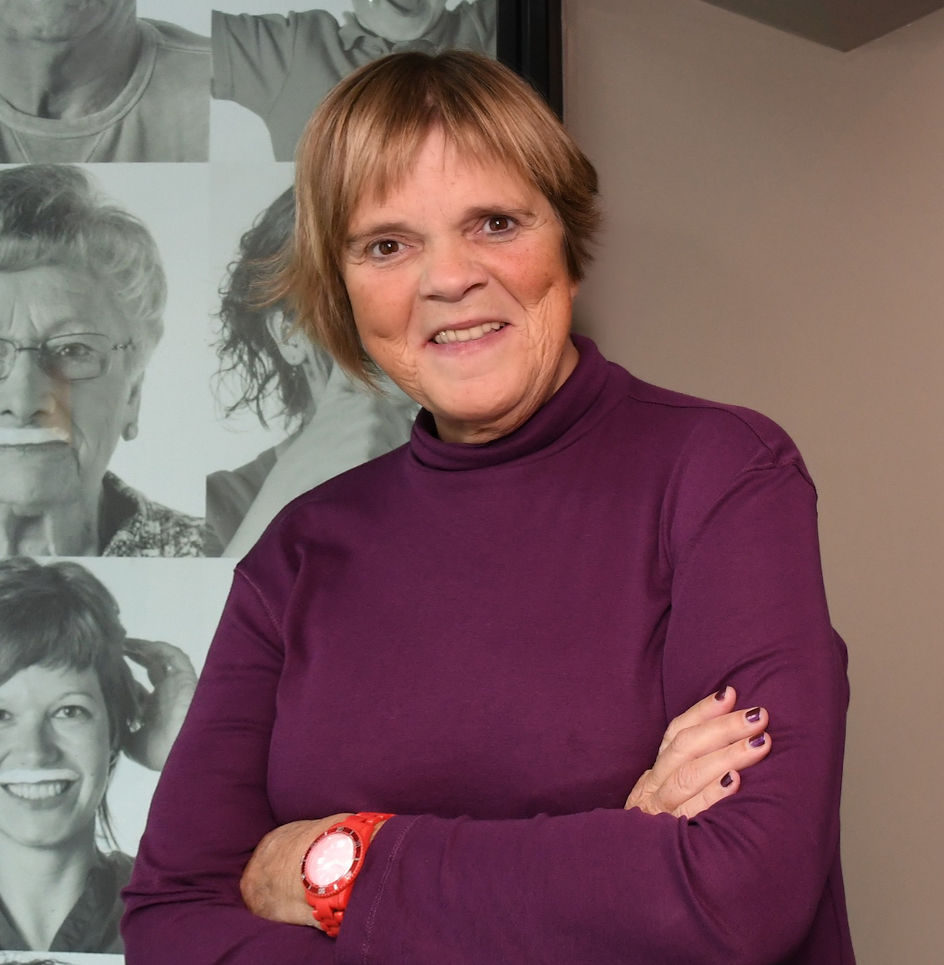

Senator
- In office 5 July 2007 – June 2011

Personal details
- Born: 17 March 1954 Turnhout, Belgium
- Died: 3 June 2026 (aged 72) Antwerp, Belgium
- Party: Open Vld
- Website: margriet.eu

Margareta Maria Josepha "Margriet" Hermans (17 March 1954 – 3 June 2026) was a Belgian singer, radio and television talk show host and politician.

== Life and career ==
In 1987, Hermans broke through as a singer in Flanders and the Netherlands. During that period, she also participated in the pre-selections for the Eurovision Song Contest three times.

In the 1990s, she grew into a true television icon. From 1989 to 1997, she hosted national and international stars in her own popular talk show, ‘Margriet’. In addition, she was a fixture on various panel programs for many years.

In 1993 a celebrity comic was based on her life, drawn by Erik Vancoillie.

In between, she was also politically active for many years, as a member of various parties; the last one was the Open VLD, since renamed to Anders. She was a member of the Flemish Parliament from 1999 to 2009. She was also elected to the Belgian Senate in 2007.

After a quieter period in the media, Hermans experienced an unexpected revival as a singer in 2022 with a new hit, Lekker Blijven Hangen.

In May 2026, it was publicly announced that she was suffering from a neuroendocrine tumour, as a result of which all planned performances were cancelled. Hermans died by euthanasia on 3 June 2026, at the age of 72.

== Awards and honours ==
- Radio 2 Summer Hit (Een Vriend): 1987
- Knight of the Order of Leopold: 2007
- Radio 2 Summer Hit (Lekker Blijven Hangen): 2022
- Radio 2 Hall of Fame: 2023
