= Ingeborg (singer) =

Belgian singer and television presenter

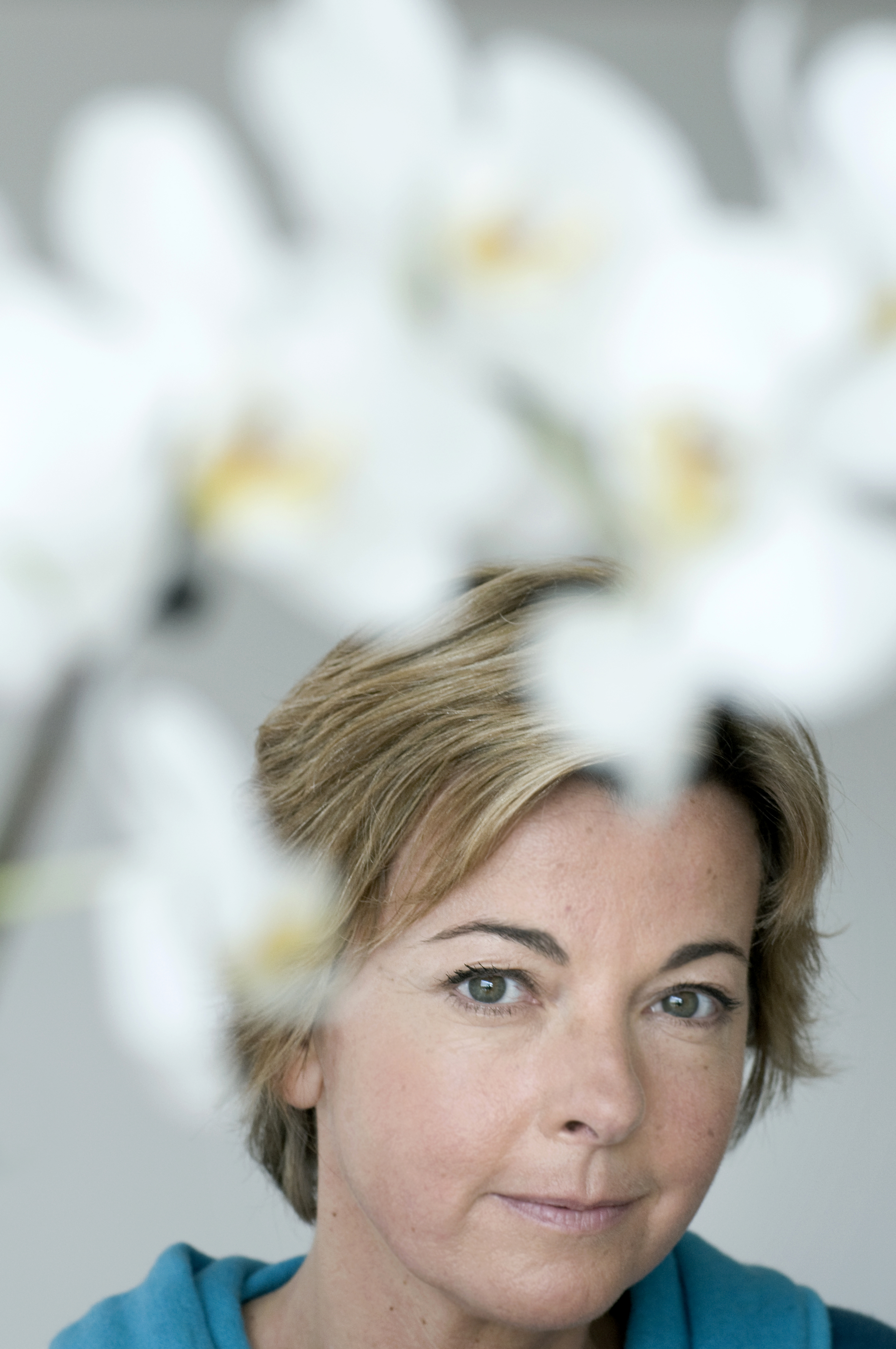

Background information
- Born: Ingeborg Thérèse Marguerite Sergeant; 15 October 1966 (age 59)
- Origin: Menen, Belgium
- Genre: Pop
- Occupation: Singer
- Website: www.evolutie.ws/nl/ingeborg/wie-ben-ik-7/ingeborg-1/ingeborg-2.htm (in Dutch)

Ingeborg (born Ingeborg Thérèse Marguerite Sergeant on 15 October 1966) is a Belgian singer and television presenter, best known outside Belgium for her participation in the 1989 Eurovision Song Contest.

== Early career ==
Ingeborg studied at the Studio Herman Teirlinck in Antwerp, a training school for young singers and stage performers. One of her fellow students was the Dutch singer Stef Bos, with whom she formed a professional and personal relationship. With other colleagues, they formed a group called Zwiep en Brons and won the jury prize in the 1988 Leids Cabaret Festival in the Dutch city of Leiden.

== Eurovision Song Contest ==
In 1989, Ingeborg's song "Door de wind" ("Through the Wind") was chosen as the Belgian representative in the 34th Eurovision Song Contest, which took place on 6 May in Lausanne, Switzerland. For the second consecutive year, the Belgian song did not prove popular with the voting juries, ending the evening in 19th place of 22 entries.

== Later career ==
In 1990 Ingeborg began working as a presenter for television channel VTM. She presented shows such as Blind Date, All You Need is Love and Bluff!, and was known as the face of the children's programme Schuif Af! which she fronted from 1990 until 2006.

Since 1999 Ingeborg has also worked as a yoga and meditation instructor. In 2007 she began working as a presenter and editor for digital channel Vitaliteit.

== Private life ==
Ingeborg is married to her manager, Roland Keyaert. The couple have one child, born in 1994, and live in Wenduinen

Preceded by Reynaert with "Laissez briller le soleil"	Belgium in the Eurovision Song Contest; 1989	Succeeded by Philippe Lafontaine with "Macédomienne"
