= VTM (TV channel) =

Belgian Dutch-speaking commercial TV station

- Country: Belgium

Programming
- Language: Dutch
- Picture format: 625 Lines PAL (analogue); 576i SDTV; 1080i HDTV (digital)

Ownership
- Owner: DPG Media
- Sister channels: VTM 2 VTM 3 VTM 4 VTM Gold; VTM Series

History
- Launched: 1 February 1989; 37 years ago

Links
- Website: www.vtm.be

Availability

Streaming media
- VTM Go: Watch live (Belgium only)

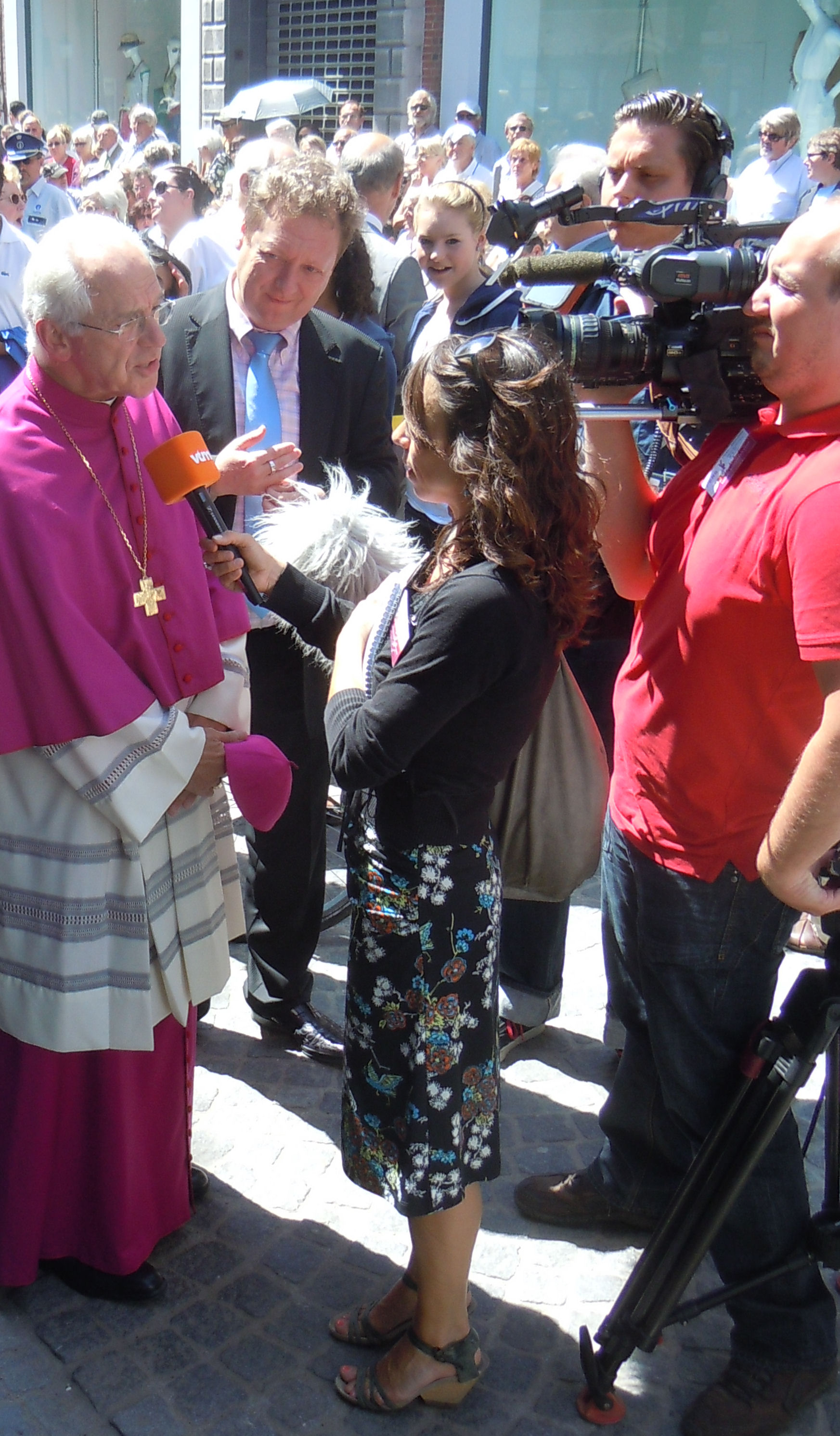
Jozef De Kesel interviewed by VTM Nieuws

VTM or Vlaamse Televisie Maatschappij (English: Flemish Television Company) is the main commercial television station in Flanders (the Dutch-speaking northern region of Belgium) and forms part of a network of channels owned by DPG Media (formerly Medialaan).

It was launched on 1 February 1989 as the second commercial television channel in Belgium after the French-speaking RTL-TVI, and quickly became the most popular TV channel in the Flemish part of Belgium. Early programming consisted of local versions of game shows like 'Familieraad' (Family Feud), 'Rad Van Fortuin' (Wheel of Fortune) or 'Waagstuk!' (Jeopardy!). The channel is also considered to have been instrumental in the rebirth of the local music industry as it was the first TV channel to promote local music through its primetime TV show 'Tien om te zien' (Ten to see), a weekly chart show with only local music productions.

The channel's focus on local music and local versions of international TV formats quickly allowed it to outperform public television in 1989 and the early 1990s. Average marketshare went up to over 40% in 1993. Currently VTM is still the Flemish commercial market leader and the 2nd biggest channel in Flanders. It can be received on cable, digital cable, IPTV in Flanders and Belgium and by satellite in Europe.

Parent company DPG Group also operates sister channels, including VTMKzoom (children's), as well as VTM 2 and VTM 3. Many programs originally aired on VTM may later rerun on these other channels. The broadcaster also owns two radio stations: Q-music and JOEfm. It also formerly owned the now defunct Radio BemBem. In 2005 there were talks about MEDIALAAN, VTM's former owner, buying the Flemish part of Canal Plus from Telenet but this fell through. In 2006 rumours spread that the RTL Group would buy 50% of MEDIALAAN, but VTM as well as RTL denied those plans.

In 2004, VTM lost its market dominance back to the public broadcaster VRT's flagship channel één. After its big rebrand in 2008 and the latest smaller rebrand in 2012, VTM regained strength with popular shows.

The channel was rebranded along with VTM 2, VTM 3, VTM 4, VTM Non-Stop and VTM Goldwhile VTM Kids changed their logo on April 1, 2025.

== History ==
On 27 October 1987, nine publishers, each with 11.1% of the shares, founded Vlaamse Televisie Maatschappij (VTM), of which Jan Merckx became chairman of the board of directors. In 1988, this company was given the monopoly for the establishment of a commercial television channel in Flanders. The publishers had little or no knowledge of the medium of television and started looking for practical implementers. From the various proposals presented to them, mainly under the encouragement of Jan Merckx, they chose the proposal of Guido Depraetere, who had previously devoted an extensive study to this. He was appointed program director, with his friend Mike Verdrengh as deputy director.

The primary cause for its creation was due to changes in the media environment since the early 1980s. Up until VTM's creation, BRT's two channels held a television monopoly. Thanks to a 1981 demonopolisation clause improving Belgian television advertising laws and the passing of a Flemish Cable Decree in 1988, VTM was granted an 18-year license to operate.

The first broadcast took place on February 1, 1989. Already from the beginning, VTM showed an empathic success: BRT(N) TV1's rating share, which in 1988 was of 57%, fell to 29% in 1990. In 1990 alone, VTM achieved an audience share of 36%.

VTM launched its second channel, Ka2, on 31 January 1995; the channel was later renamed several times. In 1996 VTM was facing problems due to heavy investments and the arrival of prestige programming that failed due to a decline in advertising revenue. After internal movements at the company, VTM started making profits again in 1998.

== TamTam ==
TamTam's logo (2000-2008)

For several years, VTM broadcast a kids' strand called TamTam, competing with VRT's Ketnet. It featured programmes such as Teletubbies Everywhere and Miffy for little children and shows such as SimsalaGrimm, Tweety and Sylvester Mysteries, Schuif Af and Kids Top 20 for older kids. During VTM's latest rebrand on 29 February 2008, the channel decided to discontinue the TamTam brand. The programming block is now broadcast under the VTM brand.

== VTM Kids ==

VTM Kids was the kids channel of VTM. It aired between 6am and 6pm. There was also a channel called VTM Kzoom+ which aired 24/7 and was a digital only channel. The VTM Kzoom channel started on 1 October 2009 and rebranded as VTM Kids on 22 December 2018, and closed in 2023 to focus on VTM GO.

Since 15 February 2015, children's programmes have been broadcast on VTM in the morning again, initially only on weekends, and since 3 July 2017 every day. Since 2 October 2017, the morning block is called VTM Kids.

VTM Kids finally rebranded its logo on April 1st 2025, to match with the 2024 rebranding.

== Teletext ==
VTM started a teletext service on 1 February 1996 which was stopped on 1 November 2014. The page 888 is still available for subtitles.

== Logos ==
1989–1993

1993–1996

2004–2008

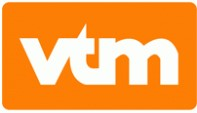
2008–2012

2012–2018

2018–2020

2020–2024

2024-present

The first logo of the channel was an uppercase VTM wordmark accompanied by red, yellow and green stripes, in reference to the slogan VTM kleurt je dag (VTM colours your day). The basic concept was used for its first fifteen years on air with a few small modifications to the design, with the wordmark remaining intact. In 2004, VTM radically changed its identity switching to a one-colour orange look and a new wordmark. Unveiled on 29 August 2004 it was touted internally as "warm, atmospheric, quick and lively". This was replaced by a lower case wordmark in 2008. The letters were now connected, under the principle of "bringing people together to watch VTM".

On 20 September 2024, VTM unveiled a new wordmark, with the letters becoming separate for the first time in sixteen years. Joining the new logo is a V monogram in order to make the network's brand more recognisable. It also coincided with a revamp of VTM Nieuws.

== See also ==
- List of television channels in Belgium
