= Why Do I Always Get It Wrong =

1989 single

"Why Do I Always Get it Wrong"

Single by Live Report
- Released: 1989
- Songwriters: Brian Hodgson; John Beeby

Eurovision Song Contest 1989 entry
- Country: United Kingdom
- Artists: Ray Caruana; John Beeby; Brian Hodgson; Maggie Jay; Mike Bell; Peter May
- As: Live Report
- Language: English
- Composers: Brian Hodgson; John Beeby
- Conductor: Ronnie Hazlehurst

Finals performance
- Final result: 2nd
- Final points: 130

Entry chronology
- ◄ "Go" (1988)
- "Give a Little Love Back to the World" (1990) ►

"Why Do I Always Get it Wrong?", is a song written by Brian Hodgson and John Beeby, and performed by the sextet Live Report, led by Ray Caruana. It represented the United Kingdom in the Eurovision Song Contest 1989.

== Composition ==
For the second year in a row, the UK entered a ballad at the Eurovision final. This song revolved around a man who took off running "where [his lover] won't find [him]", as they cause him to hurt, and leaving their presence for good is the only way to stop the pain. Crying out against his illogical love for the person who has treated him so badly, Caruana asks, "why do I always get it wrong?".

== Selection process ==
Live Report won the right to perform at the contest, held in Lausanne, by winning the UK national final, A Song for Europe, where they were the sixth act to perform. For the second of four consecutive years, Live Report was picked via a nationwide telephone vote, receiving more than twice as many votes as the second-place finisher.

== At Eurovision ==
At Lausanne, the song was performed seventh on the night, after Belgium's Ingeborg Sergeant with "Door de wind", and before Norway's Britt Synnøve with "Venners nærhet". At the end of judging that evening, "Why Do I Always Get it Wrong?" took the second-place slot with 130 points. Norway, Portugal, Luxembourg, France and Germany all gave their 12-point designations to the UK that evening. Despite losing the contest by seven points to Yugoslavia's Riva with "Rock Me," the UK actually received the most sets of 12 point designations for the evening (Yugoslavia received the 12 points from four countries).

== Charts ==
After Eurovision, the song placed at No. 73 on the UK Singles Chart, the lowest chart placing for a British runner-up Eurovision entry.

Chart (1989)	Peak position
UK Singles Official Charts Company	73

Preceded by "Go" by Scott Fitzgerald	United Kingdom in the Eurovision Song Contest; 1989	Succeeded by "Give a Little Love Back to the World" by Emma
