= Nacida para amar =

1989 song by Nina

Single by Nina

from the album Una mujer como yo
- Language: Spanish
- Released: 1989
- Genre: Latin ballad
- Length: 3:00
- Label: EMI
- Songwriter: Juan Carlos Calderón
- Producer: Juan Carlos Calderón

Eurovision Song Contest 1989 entry
- Country: Spain
- Artist: Nina
- Language: Spanish
- Composer: Juan Carlos Calderón
- Lyricist: Juan Carlos Calderón
- Conductor: Juan Carlos Calderón

Finals performance
- Final result: 6th
- Final points: 88

Entry chronology
- ◄ "La chica que yo quiero (Made in Spain)" (1988)
- "Bandido" (1990) ►

"Nacida para amar" (Spanish pronunciation: [naˈθiða ˈpaɾa aˈmaɾ]; "Born to Love") is a song recorded by Spanish singer Nina, written by Juan Carlos Calderón. It represented Spain in the Eurovision Song Contest 1989, placing sixth. Mexican singer Luis Miguel recorded a cover version of the song with new lyrics titled "Amante del amor" for his 1990 album 20 Años.

== Background ==
=== Conception ===
"Nacida para amar" was composed by Juan Carlos Calderón. It is a sensual love song, describing a romantic night with a lover. Thanking for that special night they spent "body-to-body" and being grateful for their relationship.

Calderón had already participated in Eurovision as a songwriter with Mocedades' 1973 entry "Eres tú", Sergio and Estíbaliz's 1975 entry "Tú volverás", and Paloma San Basilio's 1985 entry "La fiesta terminó".

=== Eurovision ===
On 29 March 1989, Televisión Española (TVE) announced that they had internally selected "Nacida para amar" sung by Nina as its entry for the 34th edition of the Eurovision Song Contest to be held in Lausanne, Switzerland.

On 6 May 1989, the Eurovision Song Contest was held at the Palais de Beaulieu in Lausanne hosted by Télévision suisse romande (TSR) on behalf of the Swiss Broadcasting Corporation (SRG SSR), and broadcast live throughout the continent. In her introductory video postcard, Nina was welcomed by Juan Antonio Samaranch at the International Olympic Committee headquarters in Lausanne. She performed "Nacida para amar" sixteenth on the night, following France's "J'ai volé la vie" by Nathalie Pâque and preceding Cyprus' "Apopse As Vrethume" by Fani Polymeri and Yannis Savvidakis. Calderón himself conducted the event's live orchestra in the performance of the Spanish entry.

At the close of voting, it had received 88 points, placing sixth in a field of twenty-two. It was succeeded as Spanish entry at the 1990 contest by "Bandido" by Azúcar Moreno.

=== Aftermath ===
"Nacida para amar" was included on Nina's first studio album Una mujer como yo which she released that same year.

== Legacy ==
=== Luis Miguel version ===
"Amante del amor"

Song by Luis Miguel

from the album 20 Años
- Language: Spanish
- Released: 1990
- Genre: Latin ballad
- Length: 3:19
- Label: WEA Latina
- Songwriter: Juan Carlos Calderón
- Producer: Juan Carlos Calderón

Music video
- "Amante del amor" on YouTube

Mexican singer Luis Miguel's 1990 album 20 Años includes a cover of the song titled "Amante del amor", keeping the same melody but with all new lyrics by Calderón himself. The album sold two million copies worldwide. He performed the song in his 1990–91 concert tour 20 Años Tour and he continued singing it on subsequent tours. "Amante del amor" peaked number 4 on Billboard Hot Latin Songs chart in 1991.

Spanish singer Tamara recorded a cover version of "Amante del amor" for her tenth studio album Incondicional (a Juan Carlos Calderón) released in 2013 paying tribute to Calderón.

A salsa version of "Amante del amor" produced by Tony Succar and sung by Raul Stefano was released on 28 September 2018. Succar won the Latin Grammy Award for Producer of the Year at the 20th annual ceremony for –among others– the production of this version.

=== Impersonations ===
- In the eight episode of Tu cara no me suena todavía aired on 5 May 2017 on Antena 3, Dídac Flores impersonated Nina singing "Nacida para amar" replicating her performance at Eurovision.
- "Amante del amor" titles the fifth episode of the third season of Luis Miguel: The Series released on 28 October 2021 on Netflix where is performed by Diego Boneta impersonating Luis Miguel. Boneta's version was released in the series' final season soundtrack album.
- In the thirteenth episode of the twelfth season of Tu cara me suena aired on 4 July 2025 on Antena 3, Mikel Herzog Jr. impersonated Nina singing "Nacida para amar", in a duo with Nina herself, replicating her performance at Eurovision.
