= Belgium in the Eurovision Song Contest 1989 =

- Eurovision Song Contest 1989
- Participating broadcaster: Belgische Radio- en Televisieomroep (BRT)
- Country: Belgium
- Selection process: Eurosong 1989
- Selection date: 18 March 1989

Competing entry
- Song: "Door de wind"
- Artist: Ingeborg
- Songwriter: Stef Bos

Placement
- Final result: 19th, 13 points

Participation chronology

Belgium was represented at the Eurovision Song Contest 1989 with the song "Door de wind", written by Stef Bos, and performed by Ingeborg. The Belgian participating broadcaster, Flemish Belgische Radio- en Televisieomroep (BRT), selected its entry through a national final.

== Before Eurovision ==
=== Eurosong 1989 ===
Flemish broadcaster Belgische Radio- en Televisieomroep (BRT) had the turn to participate in the Eurovision Song Contest 1989 representing Belgium. It was decided to hold another edition of Eurosong, the seventh time the name Eurosong was used for a BRT national final.

==== Competing entries ====
A total of 94 artists applied to compete in Eurosong 1989. The artists did not necessarily have to have a song ready when they applied. A 12-member jury chose twelve artists to compete in the national final. The professional jury consisted of: three representatives of SABAM (Salvatore Adamo, Will Tura, and Gaston Nuyts), three representatives of BRT Television (Luc Beerten, Maryse Van den Wijngart, and André Vermeulen), three representatives of BRT Radio (Michel Follet, Ann Lepère, and Jan Hautekiet), and three journalists (Marc Coenegracht, Mathias Danneels, and Carine Van de Ven). Known non-selected artists include: Isabelle A., Hugo Dellas, Rita Deneve, Ingriani, Beatrijs Kamoen, Micha Marah, Samantha, and Luc Steeno.

Artist	Song	Songwriter(s)
Angie Dylan	"Ik kies voor de nacht"	C. Lennarth, H. Dagleth; Johan Verminnen
Anne Mie Gils	"Ik leef"	David Davidse; P. Van Coudenbergh; B. Bracke
Bart Van den Bossche	"De kracht van een lied"	Bart Van den Bossche
Boogie Boy	"Muziek"	Jean Blaute; Eric Melaerts
Clouseau	"Anne"	Geert Hanssens
Danny Caen	"Vergeten"	Danny Caen; Hedwig Duchateau; Gyuri Spies
Expo	"Hey Hello"	H. De Meester; R. Carlsen; L. Redig
Ingeborg	"Door de wind"	Stef Bos
Jimmy Frey	"Vrijen met jou"	Jimmy Frey; Andy Free
Karen Lowe	"De dromen die ons bonden"	Karin Ottelohe
Margriet Hermans	"Wat ik bedoel"	Margriet Hermans; C. Peeters; Marc Dex
Pascale	"Ballerina"	Pascale Van de Steen; B. Dewulf

==== Final ====
The national final was broadcast live at 20:25 CET on 18 March 1989 from the Amerikaans Theater in Brussels, and was hosted by Luc Appermont. Twelve songs competed in Eurosong 1989, and were voted on by regional juries in the five Flemish provinces of Belgium, alongside a 12-member professional jury. The 12-member jury consisted of the same twelve members who chose the competing artists. Ingeborg emerged the winner by a 13-point margin, having received the highest overall score both from the regional juries and the professional jury.

Final – 18 March 1989
R/O	Artist	Song	Points	Place
1	Angie Dylan	"Ik kies voor de nacht"	39	5
2	Pascale	"Ballerina"	5	10
3	Ingeborg	"Door de wind"	64	1
4	Clouseau	"Anne"	51	2
5	Jimmy Frey	"Vrijen met jou"	3	12
6	Margriet Hermans	"Wat ik bedoel"	34	6
7	Expo	"Hey Hello"	18	8
8	Boogie Boy	"Muziek"	5	10
9	Karen Lowe	"De dromen die ons bonden"	14	9
10	Anne Mie Gils	"Ik leef"	46	3
11	Bart Van den Bossche	"De kracht van een lied"	46	3
12	Danny Caen	"Vergeten"	23	7

Detailed jury votes
R/O	Song	Professional Jury	Regional Juries					Total
R/O	Song	Professional Jury	West Flanders	East Flanders	Antwerp	Limburg	Brabant	Total
1	"Ik kies voor de nacht"	7	7	4	5	8	8	39
2	"Ballerina"			1	1	1	2	5
3	"Door de wind"	12	10	12	8	12	10	64
4	"Anne"	10	6	7	12	10	6	51
5	"Vrijen met jou"	1	2					3
6	"Wat ik bedoel"	2	5	6	7	7	7	34
7	"Hey Hello"		1	5	3	4	5	18
8	"Muziek"	5						5
9	"De dromen die ons bonden"	4	3	2	2	2	1	14
10	"Ik leef"	3	12	8	6	5	12	46
11	"De kracht van een lied"	8	8	10	10	6	4	46
12	"Vergeten"	6	4	3	4	3	3	23

== At Eurovision ==
The contest was broadcast on TV1 (with commentary by Luc Appermont) and RTBF1 (with commentary by Jacques Mercier), and on radio station BRT 2 (with commentary by Ann Lepère).

On the night of the final Ingeborg performed 6th in the running order, following Turkey and preceding the United Kingdom. At the close of the voting "Door de wind" had received 13 points, placing Belgium 19th out of 22 entries. The Belgian jury awarded its 12 points to Austria.

=== Voting ===
Points awarded to Belgium
Score	Country
12 points	
10 points	
8 points	
7 points	
6 points	
5 points	Ireland; Netherlands
4 points	
3 points	
2 points	Norway
1 point	Iceland

Points awarded by Belgium
Score	Country
12 points	Austria
10 points	Yugoslavia
8 points	Norway
7 points	Spain
6 points	Sweden
5 points	Germany
4 points	Denmark
3 points	Ireland
2 points	Portugal
1 point	Greece
