= Greece in the Eurovision Song Contest 1989 =

- Eurovision Song Contest 1989
- Participating broadcaster: Hellenic Broadcasting Corporation (ERT)
- Country: Greece
- Selection process: National final
- Selection date: 31 March 1989

Competing entry
- Song: "To diko sou asteri"
- Artist: Marianna
- Songwriters: Yannis Kyris; Marianna Efstratiou; Villy Sanianu

Placement
- Final result: 9th, 56 points

Participation chronology

Greece was represented at the Eurovision Song Contest 1989 with the song "To diko sou asteri" (Το δικό σου αστέρι), composed by Yannis Kyris and Marianna Efstratiou, with lyrics by Villy Sanianu, and performed by Marianna herself. The Greek participating broadcaster, the Hellenic Broadcasting Corporation (ERT), selected its entry through a national final.

== Before Eurovision ==
=== National final ===
The Hellenic Broadcasting Corporation (ERT) held the national final on 31 March 1989 at its television studios in Athens, hosted by Dafni Bokota. The songs were presented as video clips and the winning song was chosen by a panel of experts.

Mando later took legal action against ERT because one of the jury members didn't vote. She won the ruling, but since the process was too late to reverse the decision, Marianna went to Eurovision.

Final – 31 March 1989
R/O	Artist	Song	Points	Place
1	Marianna Efstratiou	"To diko sou asteri"	75	1
2	Dakis	"Mi fevgis Anna"	62	4
3	Mando	"Mono esi"	74	2
4	Anna Vissi	"Kleo"	69	3
5	Michalis Rakintzis	"Nana"	53	6
6	Nei Epivates	"Enohos"	62	4

== At Eurovision ==
"To diko sou asteri" was performed 19th on the night (following Switzerland's "Viver senza tei" by Furbaz and preceding Iceland's "Það sem enginn ser" by Daníel Ágúst). At the close of voting, it had received 56 points, placing 9th in a field of 22.

=== Voting ===
Points awarded to Greece
Score	Country
12 points	Cyprus; Switzerland
10 points	Portugal
8 points	
7 points	
6 points	Norway
5 points	United Kingdom
4 points	Iceland; Spain
3 points	
2 points	
1 point	Belgium; France; Netherlands

Points awarded by Greece
Score	Country
12 points	Austria
10 points	Spain
8 points	Sweden
7 points	Cyprus
6 points	Portugal
5 points	France
4 points	Italy
3 points	Germany
2 points	United Kingdom
1 point	Netherlands
