= Netherlands in the Eurovision Song Contest 1989 =

- Eurovision Song Contest 1989
- Participating broadcaster: Nederlandse Omroep Stichting (NOS)
- Country: Netherlands
- Selection process: Nationaal Songfestival 1989
- Selection date: 10 March 1989

Competing entry
- Song: "Blijf zoals je bent"
- Artist: Justine Pelmelay
- Songwriters: Jan Kisjes; Cees Bergman; Geertjan Hessing; Aart Mol; Erwin van Prehn; Elmer Veerhoff

Placement
- Final result: 15th, 45 points

Participation chronology

The Netherlands was represented at the Eurovision Song Contest 1989 with the song "Blijf zoals je bent", composed by Jan Kisjes, with lyrics by Cees Bergman, Geertjan Hessing, Aart Mol, Erwin van Prehn, and Elmer Veerhoff, and performed by Justine Pelmelay. The Dutch participating broadcaster, Nederlandse Omroep Stichting (NOS), selected its entry through a national final.

== Before Eurovision ==
=== Nationaal Songfestival 1989 ===
Nederlandse Omroep Stichting (NOS) held the national final on 10 March 1989 at the RAI Congrescentrum in Amsterdam, hosted by Linda de Mol. Thirteen songs took part with the winner being decided by juries in the twelve Dutch provinces, who awarded points from 13 down to 1. Pelmelay emerged a comfortable winner by a margin of 21 points.

Final – 10 March 1989
R/O	Artist	Song	Points	Place
1	Shannah	"Wacht op mij"	123	2
2	Full Colour	"Symphonie"	98	5
3	Ingrid Souren	"Het zal nooit meer zo zijn"	108	3
4	Bam to Bam Bam	"Lammedammadoendan"	48	10
5	Helen Marshell	"Johnny"	29	13
6	Gerald Borst	"De nachtprinses"	90	7
7	The Sisters	"Als ik je zie"	91	6
8	Angelina van Dijk	"Kijk toch om je heen"	48	10
9	The Ballroom Blitz	"Samen zijn"	108	3
10	Justine Pelmelay	"Blijf zoals je bent"	144	1
11	Brian Well	"Net als vroeger"	39	12
12	Gina	"Elke dag"	76	9
13	Two Hearts	"Johnny & Mandy"	90	7

Detailed Regional Jury Votes
R/O	Song	North Brabant	Flevoland	Friesland	North Holland	South Holland	Utrecht	Limburg	Overijssel	Groningen	Zeeland	Gelderland	Drenthe	Total
1	"Wacht op mij"	7	13	12	11	11	6	13	13	11	10	10	6	123
2	"Symphonie"	9	9	7	3	5	9	10	9	12	9	12	4	98
3	"Het zal nooit meer zo zijn"	12	10	9	9	10	7	11	4	6	12	11	7	108
4	"Lammedammadoendan"	4	1	6	5	2	8	3	7	1	7	3	1	48
5	"Johnny"	2	3	1	4	1	1	1	1	2	3	8	2	29
6	"De nachtprinses"	8	7	5	8	13	5	6	6	4	5	13	10	90
7	"Als ik je zie"	6	5	10	10	6	12	8	5	7	8	5	9	91
8	"Kijk toch om je heen"	1	2	4	1	9	4	2	8	8	4	2	3	48
9	"Samen zijn"	11	6	8	7	7	11	7	12	10	11	6	12	108
10	"Blijf zoals je bent"	13	12	13	13	12	10	12	11	13	13	9	13	144
11	"Net als vroeger"	3	4	2	2	4	2	4	2	5	2	4	5	39
12	"Elke dag"	10	8	11	6	3	3	5	3	9	6	1	11	76
13	"Johnny & Mandy"	5	11	3	12	8	13	9	10	3	1	7	8	90

== At Eurovision ==
On the night of the final Pelmelay performed 4th in the running order, following Ireland and preceding Turkey. After a strong performance, Pelmelay's voice famously cracked on the final long note of the song, a fact she acknowledged with a wry facial expression as the song ended. At the close of voting "Blijf zoals je bent" had received 45 points from ten countries, placing the Netherlands 15th of the 22 entries. The Dutch jury awarded its 12 points to Denmark.

The Dutch conductor at the contest was Harry van Hoof.

=== Voting ===
Points awarded to the Netherlands
Score	Country
12 points	
10 points	Italy
8 points	
7 points	France
6 points	Germany; Spain
5 points	
4 points	Austria; Finland
3 points	Ireland; United Kingdom
2 points	
1 point	Greece; Luxembourg

Points awarded by the Netherlands
Score	Country
12 points	Denmark
10 points	Switzerland
8 points	Yugoslavia
7 points	United Kingdom
6 points	Finland
5 points	Belgium
4 points	France
3 points	Israel
2 points	Norway
1 point	Greece
