= Ireland in the Eurovision Song Contest 1989 =

- Eurovision Song Contest 1989
- Participating broadcaster: Radio Telefís Éireann (RTÉ)
- Country: Ireland
- Selection process: Eurosong '89
- Selection date: 12 March 1989

Competing entry
- Song: "The Real Me"
- Artist: Kiev Connolly and the Missing Passengers
- Songwriter: Kiev Connolly

Placement
- Final result: 18th, 21 points

Participation chronology

Ireland was represented at the Eurovision Song Contest 1989 with the song "The Real Me", written by Kiev Connolly, and performed by Kiev Connolly and the Missing Passengers. The Irish participating broadcaster, Radio Telefís Éireann (RTÉ), selected its entry through Eurosong '89.

== Before Eurovision ==
=== Eurosong '89 ===
Held on 12 March 1989 at the Olympia Theatre in Dublin, the national final was hosted by Ronan Collins. Eight songs competed in the event, and the winner was selected by twelve members of the public.

Nicola Kerr had represented Ireland in the Eurovision Song Contest 1977, as a member of The Swarbriggs Plus Two. That entry, "It's Nice to Be in Love Again", came in third place behind France and the United Kingdom. Linda Martin's appearance in the national final selection was her third time as a soloist, and her seventh overall. She was runner-up to Sweden in the Eurovision Song Contest 1984, and would win the contest in 1992.

R/O	Artist	Song	Points	Place
1	Kiev Connolly and the Missing Passengers	"The Real Me"	104	1
2	Honor Heffernan	"Easy"	97	2
3	Nicola Kerr	"This Isn't War (It's Revolution)"	79	3
4	Barry Ronan	"Uaigneach"	48	8
5	Linda Martin	"Here We Go"	71	6
6	Jenny Newman	"Angel Eyes"	77	5
7	Dave Lalor	"Song for You"	68	7
8	Noelle	"It Was Meant to Be"	79	3

== At Eurovision ==
"The Real Me" was performed third in the running order on the night of the contest, following Israel and preceding Netherlands. At the close of the voting sequence, Ireland had received only 21 points, ranking them in 18th place. At the time, this was Ireland's worst result in the contest, and would remain so until 2001.

At the Eurovision final, Collins also provided the television commentary alongside Michelle Rocca, who co-presented the contest the previous year. Larry Gogan provided the radio commentary and Eileen Dunne was serving as spokesperson for the Irish jury.

=== Voting ===
Points awarded to Ireland
Score	Country
12 points	
10 points	
8 points	
7 points	Turkey
6 points	
5 points	
4 points	Germany
3 points	Belgium; Norway
2 points	Luxembourg; Yugoslavia
1 point	

Points awarded by Ireland
Score	Country
12 points	Yugoslavia
10 points	Denmark
8 points	Finland
7 points	Israel
6 points	France
5 points	Belgium
4 points	United Kingdom
3 points	Netherlands
2 points	Germany
1 point	Cyprus
