= Spain in the Eurovision Song Contest 1989 =

- Eurovision Song Contest 1989
- Participating broadcaster: Televisión Española (TVE)
- Country: Spain
- Selection process: Internal selection
- Announcement date: Artist: 29 March 1989; Song: 22 April 1989

Competing entry
- Song: "Nacida para amar"
- Artist: Nina
- Songwriter: Juan Carlos Calderón

Placement
- Final result: 6th, 88 points

Participation chronology

Spain was represented at the Eurovision Song Contest 1989 with the song "Nacida para amar", written by Juan Carlos Calderón, and performed by Nina. The Spanish participating broadcaster, Televisión Española (TVE), internally selected its entry for the contest. The song, performed in position 16, placed sixth out of twenty-two competing entries with 88 points.

== Before Eurovision ==
Televisión Española (TVE) internally selected "Nacida para amar" performed by Nina as its entry for the Eurovision Song Contest 1989. The song was written by Juan Carlos Calderón. The broadcaster announced the name of the song, the songwriter, and the performer on 29 March 1989. The song was presented to the press on 21 April, and premiered on the TVE show Sábado noche on 22 April.

== At Eurovision ==
On 6 May 1989, the Eurovision Song Contest was held at the Palais de Beaulieu in Lausanne hosted by Télévision suisse romande (TSR) on behalf of the Swiss Broadcasting Corporation (SRG SSR), and broadcast live throughout the continent. Nina performed "Nacida para amar" 16th on the evening, following France and preceding Cyprus. She was dressed for the occasion by Mercedes Salazar. In her introductory video postcard, she was welcomed by Juan Antonio Samaranch at the International Olympic Committee headquarters in Lausanne. Calderón himself conducted the event's live orchestra in the performance of the Spanish entry. At the close of the voting "Nacida para amar" had received 88 points, placing 6th in a field of 22.

TVE broadcast the contest in Spain on TVE 2 with commentary by Tomás Fernando Flores. It was watched by 12.5 million people in average. Before the event, TVE aired a talk show hosted by Inka Martí introducing the Spanish jury, which continued after the contest commenting on the results.

=== Voting ===
TVE assembled a jury panel with sixteen members. The following members comprised the Spanish jury:

- Luis Merino – Eurovision fan
- Blanca Andreu – poet
- Javier Tomeo – writer
- Ángeles Fernández – student
- Antonio Banderas – actor
- Isabel Mestres – actress
- Luis Miguel Calvo – bullfighter
- Emma Penella – actress
- Antonio Ozores – actor
- Pitita Ridruejo – writer
- Javier Clemente – football coach
- Dolly Fontana – public relations
- Carlos Ferrando – journalist
- Tatiana Magdalena García – hairdresser
- Félix Cábez – scriptwriter
- Charo Pascual – meteorologist

The jury was chaired by Sergi Schaaff. The jury awarded its maximum of 12 points to Italy.

Points awarded to Spain
Score	Country
12 points	
10 points	Germany; Greece; Luxembourg; Switzerland
8 points	Finland; France; Italy
7 points	Belgium; United Kingdom
6 points	
5 points	
4 points	Cyprus; Norway
3 points	
2 points	Turkey
1 point	

Points awarded by Spain
Score	Country
12 points	Italy
10 points	United Kingdom
8 points	Portugal
7 points	Finland
6 points	Netherlands
5 points	Sweden
4 points	Greece
3 points	Luxembourg
2 points	Austria
1 point	Turkey
