= Jacques Deschenaux =

Swiss journalist and television personality

Jacques Deschenaux (born 9 December 1945 in Fribourg) is a Swiss journalist and television personality.

He has worked for many years with the sports programming at the French branch of Swiss television. Among his journalistic works is a biography of Swiss racing driver Jo Siffert. In 1989 he co-hosted the Eurovision Song Contest with Lolita Morena.

== See also ==
- List of Eurovision Song Contest presenters

Preceded by (Republic of Ireland) Pat Kenny and Michelle Rocca	Eurovision Song Contest presenter (with Lolita Morena); 1989	Succeeded by (Socialist Federal Republic of Yugoslavia) Helga Vlahović & Oliver Mlakar
