= Eurovision Song Contest 1989 =

International song competition

Date and venue
- Final: 6 May 1989
- Venue: Palais de Beaulieu; Lausanne, Switzerland

Organisation
- Organiser: European Broadcasting Union (EBU)
- Scrutineer: Frank Naef

Production
- Host broadcaster: Swiss Broadcasting Corporation (SRG SSR); Télévision suisse romande (TSR)
- Director: Alain Bloch; Charles-André Grivet
- Executive producer: Raymond Zumsteg
- Musical director: Benoît Kaufman
- Presenters: Jacques Deschenaux; Lolita Morena

Participants
- Number of entries: 22
- Returning countries: Cyprus
- Participation map: Competing countries Countries that participated in the past but not in 1989

Vote
- Voting system: Each country awarded 12, 10, 8–1 point(s) to their 10 favourite songs
- Winning song: Yugoslavia "Rock Me"

The Eurovision Song Contest 1989 was the 34th edition of the Eurovision Song Contest, held on 6 May 1989 at the Palais de Beaulieu in Lausanne, Switzerland, and presented by Jacques Deschenaux and Lolita Morena. It was organised by the European Broadcasting Union (EBU) and host broadcaster Télévision suisse romande (TSR) on behalf of the Swiss Broadcasting Corporation (SRG SSR), who staged the event after winning the 1988 contest for Switzerland with the song "Ne partez pas sans moi" by Céline Dion.

Broadcasters from twenty-two countries participated in the contest, with Cyprus returning after a one-year absence. Among the participating artists were the two youngest artists to have ever participated in the contest, 12-year-old Gili Netanel and 11-year-old Nathalie Pâque representing Israel and France, respectively; the inclusion of the young performers led to some controversy in the run-up to the event, including calls for their exclusion from the contest, and although no action was taken by the organisers of this event it did result in a rule change for the following year's contest.

The winner was Yugoslavia with the song "Rock Me", composed by Rajko Dujmić, written by Stevo Cvikić and performed by the group Riva. This was Yugoslavia's first contest victory in twenty-four attempts. The United Kingdom, Denmark, Sweden, and Austria rounded out the top five positions; the United Kingdom and Denmark placed second and third respectively for a second consecutive year, and Austria finished in the top five for the first time since 1976. Finland gained its best result since 1975, while Ireland and Iceland achieved its worst ever placings to date, placing eighteenth and twenty-second respectively, with Iceland ultimately earning nul points and coming last for the first time.

== Location ==
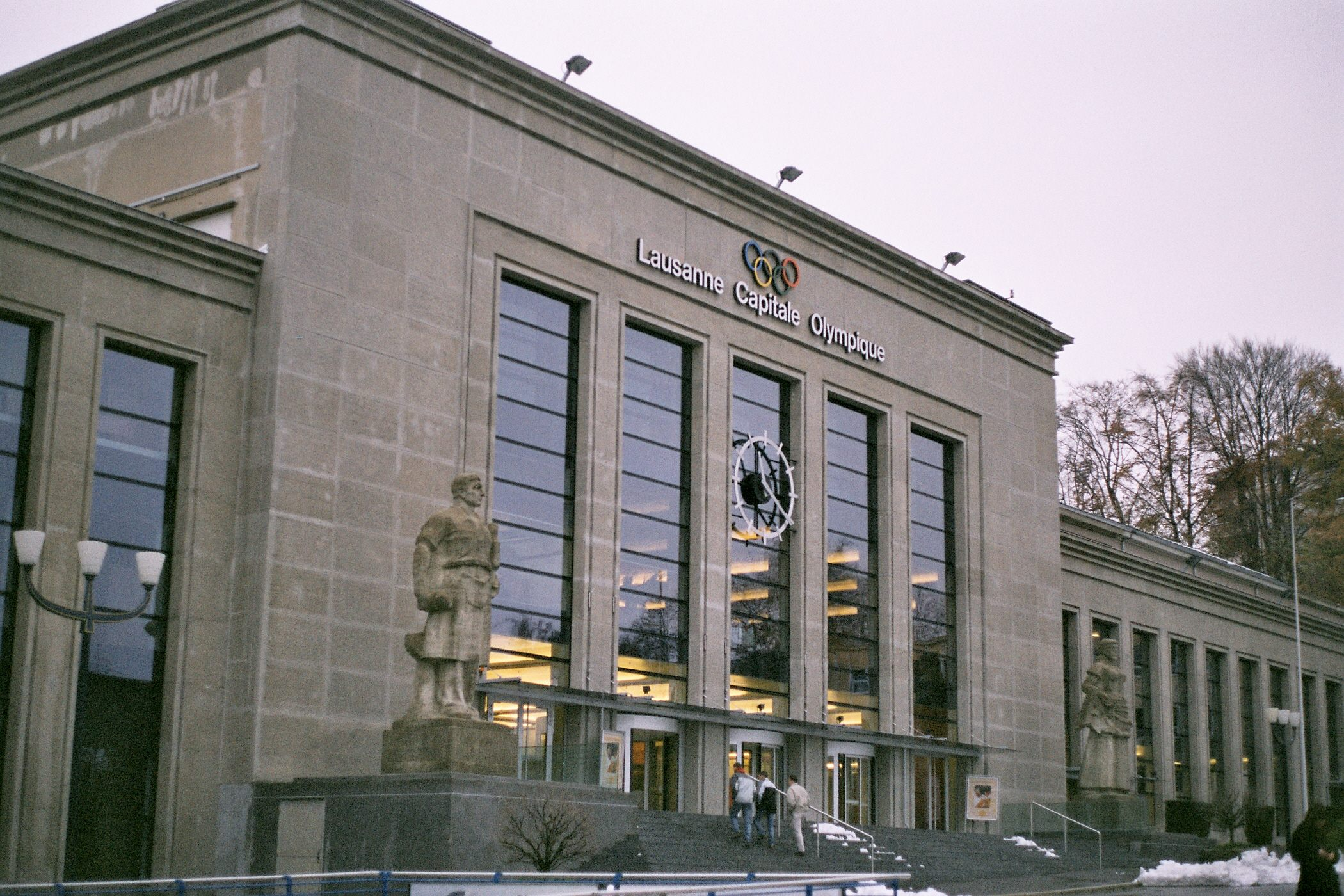
Palais de Beaulieu, Lausanne – host venue of the 1989 contest

The 1989 contest took place in Lausanne, Switzerland, following the country's victory at the 1988 contest with the song "Ne partez pas sans moi" performed by Céline Dion. It was the second time that Switzerland had hosted the event, following the inaugural edition of the contest held in 1956 in Lugano.

The chosen venue was the Palais de Beaulieu, a convention and exhibition centre. The contest took place in the Hall 7 of the Palais, also known as the Halle des Fêtes, which was temporarily renamed Salle Lys Assia in honour of Switzerland's first Eurovision winning artist. An audience of around 1,600 people could occupy the Salle Lys Assia during the contest. Over a dozen cities were reported to have applied to host the contest, with Lausanne winning out due to its combination of a suitable production venue, logistical infrastructure availability, and proximity to an international airport.

== Participants ==
Eurovision Song Contest 1989 – Participation summaries by country
- Austria; Belgium; Cyprus; Denmark; Finland; France; Germany; Greece; Iceland; Ireland; Israel; Italy; Luxembourg; Netherlands; Norway; Portugal; Spain; Sweden; Switzerland; Turkey; United Kingdom; Yugoslavia

Twenty-two countries participated in the 1989 contest, with the twenty-one countries from the previous year's event being joined by Cyprus, returning after a one-year absence.

For the first time, Switzerland sent an entry in Romansh, the smallest of Switzerland's four national languages.

No artists competing in the 1989 contest had previously taken part as lead artists in previous events, however, two of the artists had previously performed in the contest in past editions for the same country: Justine Pelmelay had been one of the backing vocalists supporting the Netherlands in 1988, and Marianna had also performed as a backing vocalist for Greece in 1987. Additionally, Søren Bundgaard who had represented Denmark in 1984, 1985, and 1988, as a member of the duo Hot Eyes, was one of Birthe Kjær's backing performers in this year's event.

For the first time since 1980, the event featured two participating songs written by the same songwriters: both the German and Austrian entries were written by Dieter Bohlen and Joachim Horn-Bernges.

The 1989 contest featured the youngest ever lead performers, in the form of 12-year-old Gili Netanel and 11-year-old Nathalie Pâque representing Israel and France respectively. Their inclusion in the contest led to controversy and protest from some of the other competitors, who felt their young age should preclude them from the contest. As there were no existing rules regarding the age of performers, the two artists were allowed to compete, however, the controversy led to the introduction of an age restriction on performing artists for the 1990 contest.

Eurovision Song Contest 1989 participants
Country	Broadcaster	Artist	Song	Language	Songwriter(s)	Conductor
Austria	ORF	Thomas Forstner	"Nur ein Lied"	German	Dieter Bohlen; Joachim Horn-Bernges	No conductor
Belgium	BRT	Ingeborg	"Door de wind"	Dutch	Stef Bos	Freddy Sunder
Cyprus	CyBC	Fanny Polymeri and Yiannis Savvidakis	"Apopse as vrethoume" (Απόψε ας βρεθούμε)	Greek	Efi Meletiou; Marios Meletiou	Haris Andreadis
Denmark	DR	Birthe Kjær	"Vi maler byen rød"	Danish	Søren Bundgaard; Keld Heick	Henrik Krogsgaard (Note: Entry partly conducted by Benoît Kaufman, as partway through the performance Krogsgaard joined Kjær on stage as a backing singer.)
Finland	YLE	Anneli Saaristo	"La dolce vita"	Finnish	Turkka Mali; Matti Puurtinen	Ossi Runne
France	Antenne 2	Nathalie Pâque	"J'ai volé la vie"	French	G.G. Candy; Sylvain Lebel; Guy Mattéoni	Guy Mattéoni
Germany	BR (Note: On behalf of the German public broadcasting consortium ARD)	Nino de Angelo	"Flieger"	German	Dieter Bohlen; Joachim Horn-Bernges	No conductor
Greece	ERT	Marianna	"To diko sou asteri" (Το δικό σου αστέρι)	Greek	Marianna Efstratiou; Yiannis Kyris; Villy Sanianou	Giorgos Niarchos
Iceland	RÚV	Daníel	"Það sem enginn sér"	Icelandic	Valgeir Guðjónsson	No conductor
Ireland	RTÉ	Kiev Connolly and the Missing Passengers	"The Real Me"	English	Kiev Connolly	Noel Kelehan
Israel	IBA	Gili and Galit	"Derekh Hamelekh" (דרך המלך)	Hebrew	Shaike Paikov	Shaike Paikov
Italy	RAI	Anna Oxa and Fausto Leali	"Avrei voluto"	Italian	Franco Berlincioni; Franco Ciani; Franco Fasano	Mario Natale
Luxembourg	CLT	Park Café	"Monsieur"	French	Yves Lacomblez; Bernard Loncheval; Maggie Parke; Gast Waltzing	Benoît Kaufman
Netherlands	NOS	Justine Pelmelay	"Blijf zoals je bent"	Dutch	Cees Bergman; Geertjan Hessing; Jan Kisjes; Aart Mol; Erwin van Prehm; Elmer Veerfoff	Harry van Hoof
Norway	NRK	Britt Synnøve Johansen	"Venners nærhet"	Norwegian	Inge Enoksen; Leiv Grøtte	Pete Knutsen
Portugal	RTP	Da Vinci	"Conquistador"	Portuguese	Pedro Luís; Ricardo	Luís Duarte
Spain	TVE	Nina	"Nacida para amar"	Spanish	Juan Carlos Calderón	Juan Carlos Calderón
Sweden	SVT	Tommy Nilsson	"En dag"	Swedish	Alexander Bard; Ola Håkansson; Tim Norell	Anders Berglund
Switzerland	SRG SSR	Furbaz	"Viver senza tei"	Romansh	Marie Louise Werth	Benoît Kaufman
Turkey	TRT	Pan	"Bana Bana"	Turkish	Timur Selçuk	Timur Selçuk
United Kingdom	BBC	Live Report	"Why Do I Always Get It Wrong"	English	John Beeby; Brian Hodgson	Ronnie Hazlehurst
Yugoslavia	JRT	Riva	"Rock Me"	Serbo-Croatian	Stevo Cvikić; Rajko Dujmić	Nikica Kalogjera

== Production ==
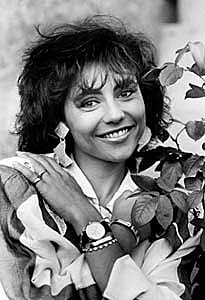
Lolita Morena, one of the two presenters of the contest

The Eurovision Song Contest 1989 was produced by the Swiss public broadcaster Télévision suisse romande (TSR) on behalf of the Swiss Broadcasting Corporation (German: Schweizerische Radio- und Fernsehgesellschaft; French: Société suisse de radiodiffusion et télévision; SRG SSR). Raymond Zumsteg served as executive producer, Alain Bloch served as producer and director, Charles-André Grivet served as director, Paul Waelti served as designer, and Benoît Kaufman served as musical director leading an assembled orchestra of 55 musicians. A separate musical director could be nominated by each participating delegation to lead the orchestra during its country's performance, with the host musical director also available to conduct for those countries which did not nominate their own conductor. On behalf of the contest organisers, the European Broadcasting Union (EBU), the event was overseen by Frank Naef as scrutineer.

Following the confirmation of the twenty-two competing countries, the draw to determine the running order of the contest was held on 23 November 1988. Production details related to the contest were also shared on this date, including the contest's mascot and logo. The mascot, Cindy Aeschbach, an 11-year old girl from Morges, was chosen from among two hundred girls from schools in the Swiss region of La Côte to embody the character of Heidi in the contest's opening sequence. The logo, designed by Fritz Aeschbach, is a representation of the Matterhorn created with computer graphics, constructed using contour lines to represent the strings of a guitar, and featuring a silhouette outline of Lausanne Cathedral at the base. The presenters of the contest were publicly revealed on 17 January 1989: the sports journalist and television presenter Jacques Deschenaux and the television presenter and Miss Switzerland 1982 Lolita Morena were chosen from among several candidates considered by TSR.

Rehearsals for the participating artists began on 1 May 1989. Two technical rehearsals were conducted for each participating delegation in the week approaching the contest, with countries rehearsing in the order in which they would perform. The first rehearsals of 50 minutes were held on 1 and 2 May, followed by a press conference for each delegation and the accredited press. Each country's second rehearsals were held on 3 and 4 May and lasted 35 minutes total. Three dress rehearsals were held with all artists, held in the afternoon and evening of 5 May and in the afternoon of 6 May; all dress rehearsals were held in front of an audience, although for the afternoon rehearsal on 5 May, the acts were not required to be in their performance costumes.

During the contest week each delegation also took part in recording sessions for the postcards, short films which served as an introduction to each country's entry, as well as providing an opportunity for transition between entries and allow stage crew to make changes on stage. Footage for the postcards were filmed between 1 and 4 May for the delegations, with the exception of the Swiss delegation which filmed for its postcard in the weeks leading up to the contest; delegations recorded for their postcards on one of the days in which they were not required to be present at the contest venue. Delegations were also invited to a number of special events during the contest week: on 1 May a welcome reception was hosted by the Council of States of the canton of Vaud and the municipality of Lausanne in the ballroom of the Palais de Beaulieu; on 2 May, Céline Dion performed her first show on Swiss soil as part of her Incognito Tour at the Théâtre de Beaulieu; a dinner cruise on Lake Geneva was organised for 3 May; and a reception on 5 May was organised by the tourist office of the canton of Grisons.

== Format ==
Each participating broadcaster submitted one song, which was required to be no longer than three minutes in duration and performed in the language, or one of the languages, of the country which it represented. A maximum of six performers were allowed on stage during each country's performance. Each entry could utilise all or part of the live orchestra and could use instrumental-only backing tracks, however any backing tracks used could only include the sound of instruments featured on stage being mimed by the performers.

The results of the 1989 contest were determined through the same scoring system as had first been introduced in 1975: each country awarded twelve points to its favourite entry, followed by ten points to its second favourite, and then awarded points in decreasing value from eight to one for the remaining songs which featured in the country's top ten, with countries unable to vote for their own entry. The points awarded by each country were determined by an assembled jury of sixteen individuals, who were all required to be members of the public with no connection to the music industry, split evenly between men and women and by age. Each jury member voted in secret and awarded between one and ten votes to each participating song, excluding that from their own country and with no abstentions permitted. The votes of each member were collected following the country's performance and then tallied by the non-voting jury chairperson to determine the points to be awarded. In any cases where two or more songs in the top ten received the same number of votes, a show of hands by all jury members was used to determine the final placing.

Partly due to the close result at the previous year's event, the tie-break procedure, to determine a single winner should two or more countries finish in first place with the same number of points, was modified. For the 1989 event and for future contents, an analysis of the tied countries' top marks would be conducted, with the country that received the most 12-point scores being declared the winner. If a tie for first place remained then the country with the most 10 points would be crowned the winner. Should two or more countries still remain tied for first place after analysing both 12- and 10-point scores then the tying countries would be declared joint winners.

== Contest overview ==
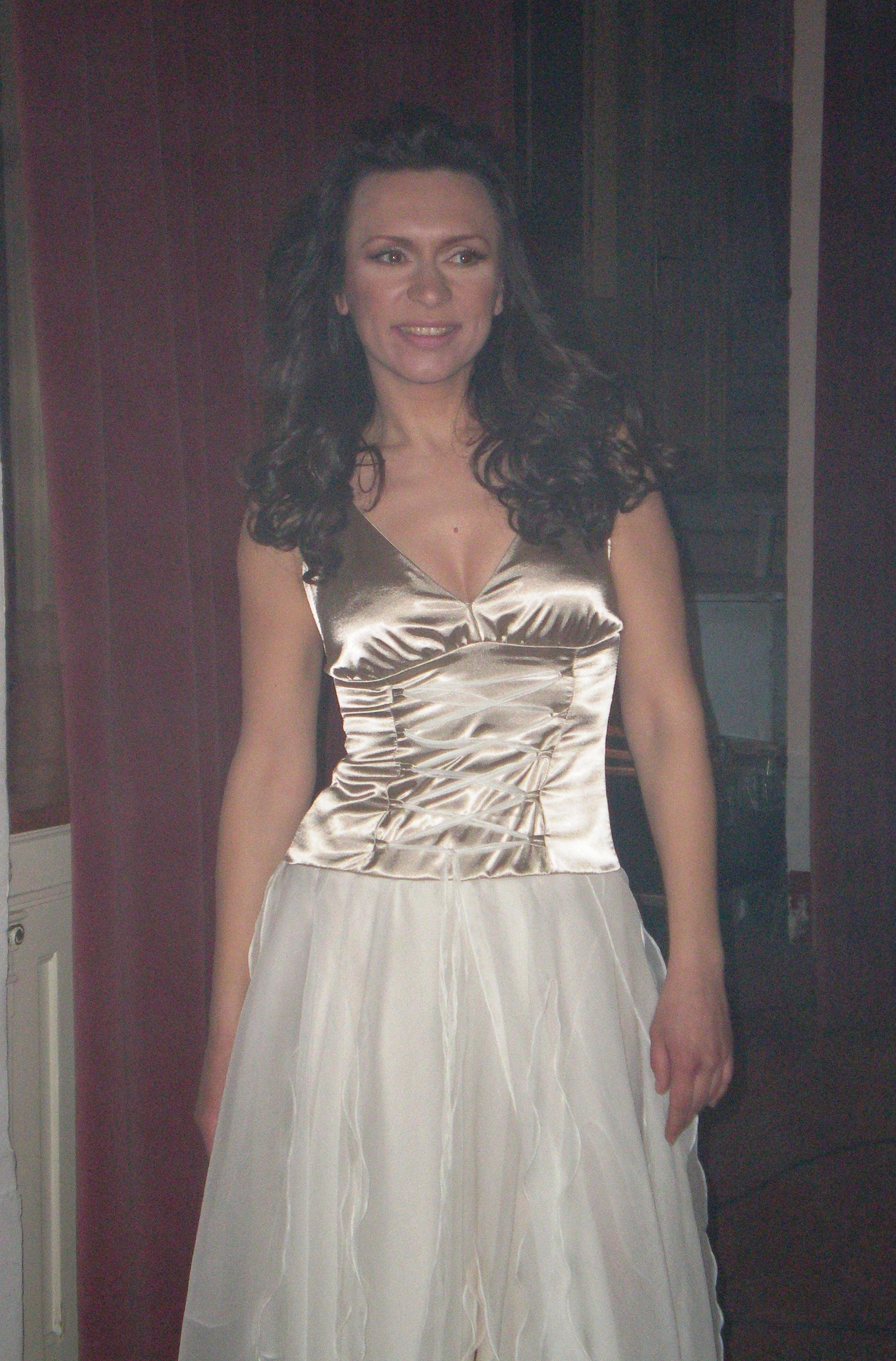
Emilija Kokić (pictured in 2008), lead vocalist of the winning group Riva.

The contest took place on 6 May 1989 at 21:00 (CEST) with a duration of 3 hours and 10 minutes and was presented by Jacques Deschenaux and Lolita Morena.

The contest opened with a seven minute film, directed by Jean-Marc Panchaud, highlighting modern Swiss landscapes and themes in juxtaposition with paintings by celebrated Swiss artists and starring Sylvie Aeschbach as Heidi. This was followed by performances in the contest venue by the reigning Eurovision winner Céline Dion, who performed both her winning song from the 1988 contest "Ne partez pas sans moi" and the premiere of her first English language single "Where Does My Heart Beat Now". The interval act was the stunt artist Guy Tell; modelling himself after the Swiss folk hero William Tell, Guy Tell used high-powered crossbows to pierce various targets with precision at distance. The climax of the performance featured sixteen crossbows being positioned to set off a chain reaction in sequence, with the arrow from the first crossbow hitting a target which set off the next crossbow, culminating in an arrow piercing an apple set above the head of the performer. Ultimately however, on the night of the contest itself, the final arrow missed the apple slightly by a few centimetres. The trophy awarded to the winners was presented at the end of the broadcast by Céline Dion and Sylvie Aeschbach.

The winner was Yugoslavia represented by the song "Rock Me", composed by Rajko Dujmić, written by Stevo Cvikić and performed by the band Riva. It was Yugoslavia's first Eurovision win on its twenty-fourth contest appearance, becoming the seventeenth nation to win the contest. It would also prove to be the country's only win, as the nation would begin to break into separate states two years later and would eventually participate for the last time in 1992. It was the sixth time that the song which was performed last ended up winning the contest. The United Kingdom and Denmark placed second and third respectively for the second consecutive year, with the United Kingdom finishing in second place for the twelfth time in total. Austria finished in the top five for the first time since 1976, while Finland achieved its best result since 1975. Ireland achieved its worst result to date, and for the third consecutive year one of the participating countries failed to receive any points, on this occasion Iceland became the newest country to receive nul points, its worst result in four years of participation. During the traditional winner's reprise performance, Riva sung the winning song entirely in English.

Results of the Eurovision Song Contest 1989
R/O	Country	Artist	Song	Points	Place
1	Italy	Anna Oxa and Fausto Leali	"Avrei voluto"	56	9
2	Israel	Gili and Galit	"Derekh Hamelekh"	50	12
3	Ireland	Kiev Connolly and the Missing Passengers	"The Real Me"	21	18
4	Netherlands	Justine Pelmelay	"Blijf zoals je bent"	45	15
5	Turkey	Pan	"Bana Bana"	5	21
6	Belgium	Ingeborg	"Door de wind"	13	19
7	United Kingdom	Live Report	"Why Do I Always Get It Wrong"	130	2
8	Norway	Britt Synnøve Johansen	"Venners nærhet"	30	17
9	Portugal	Da Vinci	"Conquistador"	39	16
10	Sweden	Tommy Nilsson	"En dag"	110	4
11	Luxembourg	Park Café	"Monsieur"	8	20
12	Denmark	Birthe Kjær	"Vi maler byen rød"	111	3
13	Austria	Thomas Forstner	"Nur ein Lied"	97	5
14	Finland	Anneli Saaristo	"La dolce vita"	76	7
15	France	Nathalie Pâque	"J'ai volé la vie"	60	8
16	Spain	Nina	"Nacida para amar"	88	6
17	Cyprus	Fanny Polymeri and Yiannis Savvidakis	"Apopse as vrethoume"	51	11
18	Switzerland	Furbaz	"Viver senza tei"	47	13
19	Greece	Marianna	"To diko sou asteri"	56	9
20	Iceland	Daníel	"Það sem enginn sér"	0	22
21	Germany	Nino de Angelo	"Flieger"	46	14
22	Yugoslavia	Riva	"Rock Me"	137	1

=== Spokespersons ===
Each participating broadcaster appointed a spokesperson, connected to the contest venue via telephone lines and responsible for announcing, in English or French, the votes for its respective country. Known spokespersons at the 1989 contest are listed below.

- Finland – Solveig Herlin
- Iceland – Erla Björk Skúladóttir
- Ireland – Eileen Dunne
- Luxembourg – Jean-Luc Bertrand
- Sweden – Agneta Bolme Börjefors
- United Kingdom – Colin Berry

== Detailed voting results ==
Jury voting was used to determine the points awarded by all countries. The announcement of the results from each country was conducted in the order in which they performed, with the spokespersons announcing their country's points in English or French in ascending order. The detailed breakdown of the points awarded by each country is listed in the tables below.

Detailed voting results of the Eurovision Song Contest 1989
		Total score	Italy	Israel	Ireland	Netherlands	Turkey	Belgium	United Kingdom	Norway	Portugal	Sweden	Luxembourg	Denmark	Austria	Finland	France	Spain	Cyprus	Switzerland	Greece	Iceland	Germany	Yugoslavia
Contestants	Italy	56									7					10		**12**	6	2	4		7	8
Contestants	Israel	50	1		7	3			2			5		5		5				7		5	3	7
Contestants	Ireland	21					7	3		3			2										4	2
Contestants	Netherlands	45	10		3				3				1		4	4	7	6			1		6	
Contestants	Turkey	5																1						4
Contestants	Belgium	13			5	5				2												1		
Contestants	United Kingdom	130	6	7	4	7	1			**12**	**12**	10	**12**	1	8	6	**12**	10	2		2		**12**	6
Contestants	Norway	30		2		2	5	8				2		6			4			1				
Contestants	Portugal	39					4	2		1		3	7		6	2		8			6			
Contestants	Sweden	110		6				6	4	8	8		6	**12**	**12**		2	5	8	3	8	2	8	**12**
Contestants	Luxembourg	8															5	3						
Contestants	Denmark	111	5	1	10	**12**	6	4	10	10	2	**12**	3		7	**12**	6					10		1
Contestants	Austria	97	**12**	8			3	**12**				7		4		1		2	10	8	**12**	8	5	5
Contestants	Finland	76		10	8	6	10				1	4	4		3		10	7	3					10
Contestants	France	60	3	5	6	4				5		1	8	3	5	3			7		5		2	3
Contestants	Spain	88	8				2	7	7	4			10			8	8		4	10	10		10	
Contestants	Cyprus	51	2	3	1				6		6			8	2					4	7	**12**		
Contestants	Switzerland	47	4	4		10	8		8		3			2	1							7		
Contestants	Greece	56				1		1	5	6	10						1	4	**12**	**12**		4		
Contestants	Iceland	0																						
Contestants	Germany	46	7		2			5	1		5	6		7					1	6	3	3		
Contestants	Yugoslavia	**137**		**12**	**12**	8	**12**	10	**12**	7	4	8	5	10	10	7	3		5	5		6	1	

=== 12 points ===
The below table summarises how the maximum 12 points were awarded from one country to another. The winning country is shown in bold. The United Kingdom received the maximum score of 12 points from five of the voting countries, with Yugoslavia receiving four sets of 12 points, Austria, Denmark and Sweden each receiving three sets of maximum scores, Greece receiving two sets of 12 points, and Cyprus and Italy receiving one maximum score each.

Distribution of 12 points awarded at the Eurovision Song Contest 1989
N.	Contestant	Nation(s) giving 12 points
5	United Kingdom	France, Germany, Luxembourg, Norway, Portugal
4	**Yugoslavia**	Ireland, Israel, Turkey, United Kingdom
3	Austria	Belgium, Greece, Italy
3	Denmark	Finland, Netherlands, Sweden
3	Sweden	Austria, Denmark, Yugoslavia
2	Greece	Cyprus, Switzerland
1	Cyprus	Iceland
1	Italy	Spain

== Broadcasts ==
Each participating broadcaster was required to relay the contest via its networks. Non-participating member broadcasters were also able to relay the contest as "passive participants". Broadcasters were able to send commentators to provide coverage of the contest in their own native language and to relay information about the artists and songs to their television viewers. These commentators were typically sent to the venue to report on the event, and were able to provide commentary from small booths constructed at the back of the venue.

The contest had an estimated total audience of over 500 to 600 million viewers and listeners, with the contest reportedly broadcast on 35 channels in 30 countries. Known details on the broadcasts in each country, including the specific broadcasting stations and commentators are shown in the tables below.

Broadcasters and commentators in participating countries
Country	Broadcaster	Channel(s)	Commentator(s)	Ref.
Austria	ORF	FS1	Ernst Grissemann	
Belgium	BRT	TV1	Luc Appermont	
Belgium	BRT	BRT 2	Ann Lepère	
Belgium	RTBF	RTBF1	Jacques Mercier	
Cyprus	CyBC	RIK, A Programma	Neofytos Taliotis	
Denmark	DR	DR TV	Jørgen de Mylius	
Denmark	DR	DR P3	Kurt Helge Andersen	
Finland	YLE	TV1, 2-verkko	Heikki Harma	
France	Antenne 2		Lionel Cassan	
France	TV5 Europe		Jean-Charles Simon	
Germany	ARD	Erstes Deutsches Fernsehen	Thomas Gottschalk	
Germany			Ado Schlier	
Germany	SSVC	SSVC Television		
Greece	ERT	ET1		
Iceland	RÚV	Sjónvarpið, Rás 1	Arthúr Björgvin Bollason	
Ireland	RTÉ	RTÉ 1	Ronan Collins and Michelle Rocca	
Ireland	RTÉ	RTÉ Radio 1	Larry Gogan	
Israel	IBA	Israeli Television, Reshet Gimel		
Italy	RAI	Rai Uno (Note: Deferred broadcast at 23:10 (CEST))	Gabriella Carlucci	
Luxembourg	CLT	RTL Télévision (Note: Broadcast only on Canal 21)		
Netherlands	NOS	Nederland 3	Willem van Beusekom	
Norway	NRK	NRK Fjernsynet, NRK P2	John Andreassen	
Portugal	RTP	RTP Canal 1	Ana Zanatti	
Spain	TVE	TVE 2	Tomás Fernando Flores	
Sweden	SVT	Kanal 1	Jacob Dahlin	
Sweden	RR	SR P3	Kent Finell and Janeric Sundquist	
Switzerland	SRG SSR	TV DRS	Bernard Thurnheer	
Switzerland	SRG SSR	TSR	Thierry Masselot	
Switzerland	SRG SSR	TSI (Note: Broadcast through a second audio programme on TSR)	Giovanni Bertini	
Switzerland	SRG SSR	La Première		
Switzerland	Radio Zürisee			
Turkey	TRT	TV1	Bülend Özveren	
United Kingdom	BBC	BBC1	Terry Wogan	
United Kingdom	BBC	BBC Radio 2 (Note: Simulcast on BBC Radio Cleveland, BBC Radio Devon, BBC Radio Gloucestershire, BBC Radio Solent, BBC Radio Ulster, and BBC Radio Wales.)	Ken Bruce	
Yugoslavia	JRT	TV Beograd 1, TV Novi Sad, TV Zagreb 1	Oliver Mlakar	
Yugoslavia	JRT	TV Ljubljana 1		
Yugoslavia	JRT	TV Prishtina		
Yugoslavia	JRT	TV Skopje 1		

Broadcasters and commentators in non-participating countries
Country	Broadcaster	Channel(s)	Commentator(s)	Ref.
Australia	SBS	SBS TV (Note: Deferred broadcast the following day at 20:30 (AEST))		
Bulgaria	BT	BT 1 (Note: Delayed broadcast on 4 June 1989 at 20:30 (EEST))		
Canada	TV5	TV5 Québec Canada (Note: Deferred broadcast at 20:00 (EDT))	Jean-Charles Simon	
Czechoslovakia	ČST	I. program (Note: Delayed broadcast on 13 May 1989 at 21:20 (CEST))		
Faroe Islands	SvF			
Greenland	KNR	KNR (Note: Delayed broadcast on 20 May 1989 at 21:30 (WGST))		
Hungary	MTV	MTV2 (Note: Deferred broadcast at 22:00 (CEST))	István Vágó	
Poland	TP	TP1 (Note: Delayed broadcast on 20 May 1989 at 20:05 (CEST))		
South Korea	KBS	KBS1 (Note: Delayed broadcast on 9 June 1989 at 22:00 (KST))		
Soviet Union	CT USSR	Programme One (Note: Also broadcast deferred via the Orbita satellite broadcasting system in the Soviet Far East)	Grigory Shestakov	
Soviet Union	ETV			

== See also ==
- Eurovision Young Dancers 1989

== Notes and references ==
=== Bibliography ===
- Murtomäki, Asko (2007). Finland 12 points! Suomen Euroviisut (in Finnish). Helsinki, Finland: Teos. ISBN 951-851-106-3.
- O'Connor, John Kennedy (2010). The Eurovision Song Contest: The Official History (2nd ed.). London, United Kingdom: Carlton Books. ISBN 978-1-84732-521-1.
- Roxburgh, Gordon (2016). Songs for Europe: The United Kingdom at the Eurovision Song Contest. Vol. Three: The 1980s. Prestatyn, United Kingdom: Telos Publishing. ISBN 978-1-84583-118-9.
- Thorsson, Leif; Verhage, Martin (2006). Melodifestivalen genom tiderna : de svenska uttagningarna och internationella finalerna [Melodifestivalen through the ages: the Swedish selections and international finals] (in Swedish). Stockholm, Sweden: Premium Publishing. ISBN 91-89136-29-2.
