= Denmark in the Eurovision Song Contest 1989 =

- Eurovision Song Contest 1989
- Participating broadcaster: Danmarks Radio (DR)
- Country: Denmark
- Selection process: Dansk Melodi Grand Prix 1989
- Selection date: 25 March 1989

Competing entry
- Song: "Vi maler byen rød"
- Artist: Birthe Kjær
- Songwriters: Søren Bundgaard; Keld Heick

Placement
- Final result: 3rd, 111 points

Participation chronology

Denmark was represented at the Eurovision Song Contest 1989 with the song "Vi maler byen rød", composed by Søren Bundgaard, with lyrics by Keld Heick, and performed by Birthe Kjær. The Danish participating broadcaster, Danmarks Radio (DR), organised the Dansk Melodi Grand Prix 1989 in order to select its entry for the contest. This was the first Kjær's victory at the DMGP after three runner-up finishes earlier in the 1980s.

== Before Eurovision ==
=== Dansk Melodi Grand Prix 1989 ===
Danmarks Radio (DR) held the Dansk Melodi Grand Prix 1989 on 25 March at the Bella Center in Copenhagen, hosted Jarl de Friis-Mikkelsen. Ten songs took part, with the winner being chosen by nine regional juries. Other participants included Danish representatives Gry Johansen (1983) and Jørgen Olsen (2000).

Final – 25 March 1989
R/O	Artist	Song	Songwriter(s)	Points	Place
1	Birthe Kjær	"Vi maler byen rød"	Søren Bundgaard; Keld Heick	32	1
2	Maria Cecile	"Kun dig"	George Keller; Flemming Jørgensen	23	5
3	Lars Fenger	"Kom i sving"	Bent Hesselmann; Lars Fenger	8	9
4	Pia Cohn	"Nu er jeg blot en stemme"	Arne Würgler	25	4
5	Snapshot	"Du og jeg"	Turid Christensen	10	8
6	Keld and Hilda Heick	"Sommerregn"	Keld Heick; Hilda Heick	11	7
7	Lecia Jønsson	"Landet Camelot"	Ole Bredahl; Lecia Jønsson	30	2
8	Gry Johansen	"Endnu en nat"	Per Meilstrup; Keld Heick	22	6
9	Peter Belli	"Lyset bryder frem"	Kim Helweg; Morten Nilsson	0	10
10	Jørgen Olsen	"Fugle"	Wolfgang Käfer; Jørgen Olsen	28	3

Detailed Regional Jury Votes
R/O	Song	Mid and West Jutland	Funen	Greater Copenhagen	North Jutland	Bornholm	East Jutland	South Jutland	Zealand, Lolland, and Falster	Vejle	Total
1	"Vi maler byen rød"	8		8		4		4	8		32
2	"Kun dig"	1	6			6			2	8	23
3	"Kom i sving"		1	1			6				8
4	"Nu er jeg blot en stemme"		4	6	6		8			1	25
5	"Du og jeg"	6			1	1	1		1		10
6	"Sommerregn"							1	4	6	11
7	"Landet Camelot"	2		4	4		4	8	6	2	30
8	"Endnu en nat"	4	2		2	8		2		4	22
9	"Lyset bryder frem"										0
10	"Fugle"		8	2	8	2	2	6			28

== At Eurovision ==
On the night of the final Kjær performed 12th in the running order, following Luxembourg and preceding Austria. At the close of voting "Vi maler byen rød" had received 111 points, placing Denmark third of the 22 entries, the country's second consecutive third-place finish. The Danish jury awarded its 12 points to Sweden.

The contest was broadcast on DR TV (with commentary by Jørgen de Mylius) and on radio station DR P3 (with commentary by Kurt Helge Andersen).

=== Voting ===
Points awarded to Denmark
Score	Country
12 points	Finland; Netherlands; Sweden
10 points	Iceland; Ireland; Norway; United Kingdom
8 points	
7 points	Austria
6 points	France; Turkey
5 points	Italy
4 points	Belgium
3 points	Luxembourg
2 points	Portugal
1 point	Israel; Yugoslavia

Points awarded by Denmark
Score	Country
12 points	Sweden
10 points	Yugoslavia
8 points	Cyprus
7 points	Germany
6 points	Norway
5 points	Israel
4 points	Austria
3 points	France
2 points	Switzerland
1 point	United Kingdom
