= Israel in the Eurovision Song Contest 1989 =

- Eurovision Song Contest 1989
- Participating broadcaster: Israel Broadcasting Authority (IBA)
- Country: Israel
- Selection process: Kdam Eurovision 1989
- Selection date: 30 March 1989

Competing entry
- Song: "Derekh Hamelekh"
- Artist: Gili and Galit
- Songwriter: Shaike Paikov

Placement
- Final result: 12th, 50 points

Participation chronology

Israel was represented at the Eurovision Song Contest 1989 with the song "Derekh Hamelekh", written by Shaike Paikov, and performed by Gili and Galit. The Israeli participating broadcaster, the Israel Broadcasting Authority (IBA), selected its entry for the contest through Kdam Eurovision 1989.

== Before Eurovision ==
=== Kdam Eurovision 1989 ===
The Israel Broadcasting Authority (IBA) held Kdam Eurovision 1989 on 30 March 1989, hosted by Moshe Beker and Shira Gera. 12 songs competed in the national final, where regional televoting chose the winner. Members of the public were phoned at random and were asked for their favourite song. These results were converted into votes for six regions of Israel.

The winner was Gili Netanel and Galit Burg-Michael with the song "Derekh Hamelekh".

Final – 27 March 1989
R/O	Artist	Song	Points	Place
1	Nissim Garameh	"Holef lo im hazman"	31	5
2	Vardina Cohen	"Shvil ha'zahav"	12	9
3	Osnat Zano	"Hagvul hu hashamayim"	12	9
4	Anat Atzmon	"Bachalom"	34	4
5	Milk and Honey	"Ani ma'amin"	26	8
6	Mango	"Yedidai"	30	6
7	Avi Dor and Shem Zmani	"Mebit mehatzad"	27	7
8	Avi Toledano	"Dayenu"	60	2
9	Romi Halachmi	"Eich ze koreh"	3	12
10	Aliza Aviv and Revi'iyat Aviv	"Shalom al aretz"	4	11
11	Gili and Galit	"Derekh hamelekh"	68	1
12	Ofira and Ravit Yosefi	"Lismoach ve lirkod"	41	3

Detailed Regional Voting Results
R/O	Song	Jerusalem	HaSharon	Haifa and Northern District	Southern District	Shfela	Tel Aviv and Gush Dan	Total
1	"Holef lo im hazman"	6	4	1	6	12	2	31
2	"Shvil ha'zahav"	2	3		3		4	12
3	"Hagvul hu hashamayim"	3	2	3		4		12
4	"Bachalom"	5	8	5	5	6	5	34
5	"Ani ma'amin"	4	5	4	4	3	6	26
6	"Yedidai"	8		6	2	7	7	30
7	"Mebit mehatzad"		7	8	7	2	3	27
8	"Dayenu"	10	10	12	10	8	10	60
9	"Eich ze koreh"		1			1	1	3
10	"Shalom al aretz"	1		2	1			4
11	"Derekh hamelekh"	12	12	10	12	10	12	68
12	"Lismoach ve lirkod"	7	6	7	8	5	8	41

== At Eurovision ==
Netanel and Burg-Michael performed 2nd on the night of the contest, following Italy and preceding Ireland. At the close of the voting it had received 50 points, placing 12th in a field of 22.

=== Voting ===
Points awarded to Israel
Score	Country
12 points	
10 points	
8 points	
7 points	Ireland; Switzerland; Yugoslavia
6 points	
5 points	Denmark; Finland; Iceland; Sweden
4 points	
3 points	Germany; Netherlands
2 points	United Kingdom
1 point	Italy

Points awarded by Israel
Score	Country
12 points	Yugoslavia
10 points	Finland
8 points	Austria
7 points	United Kingdom
6 points	Sweden
5 points	France
4 points	Switzerland
3 points	Cyprus
2 points	Norway
1 point	Denmark
