= Finland in the Eurovision Song Contest 1989 =

- Eurovision Song Contest 1989
- Participating broadcaster: Yleisradio (Yle)
- Country: Finland
- Selection process: National final
- Selection date: 4 February 1989

Competing entry
- Song: "La dolce vita"
- Artist: Anneli Saaristo
- Songwriters: Matti Puurtinen; Turkka Mali

Placement
- Final result: 7th, 76 points

Participation chronology

Finland was represented at the Eurovision Song Contest 1989 with the song "La dolce vita", composed by Matti Puurtinen, with lyrics by Turkka Mali, and performed by Anneli Saaristo. The Finnish participating broadcaster, Yleisradio (Yle), selected its entry in the contest through a national final.

== Before Eurovision ==
=== National final ===
For the first time Yleisradio (Yle) decided to combine inviting composers and open submissions. Ten entries were selected for the competition from 210 submissions received during a submission period as well as from seven composers directly invited by Yle. The national final was held on 4 February 1989 at the Kulttuuritalo in Helsinki, hosted by Tarja Koskela. The winner was chosen by an expert jury. Each juror distributed their points between 1–8 and 10 for each song, and 12 for the best song. Other participants included former Finnish representatives Kirka (1984) and Sonja Lumme (1985).

In addition to the performances of the competing entries, the show was opened by Sabrina performing "My Chico". Later, as an interval act, Sabrina performed "Like a Yo-Yo".

Final – 4 February 1989
R/O	Artist	Song	Songwriter(s)	Points	Place
1	Anneli Saaristo	"Oi äiti maa"	Petri Laaksonen; VeePee Lehto	74	3
2	Mervi Hiltunen	"Kan det vara kärlek"	Harri Koivuniemi; Claire Witick-Mäkelä	72	4
3	Kirka	"Hiljaisuutta"	Kisu Jernström; Kassu Halonen; Vexi Salmi	62	5
4	Meiju Suvas	"Rauhaton sydän"	Risto Asikainen; Meiju Suvas	24	10
5	Tanjalotta Räikkä	"Huominen Eurooppa"	Gösta Sundqvist	39	8
6	Anneli Saaristo	"La dolce vita"	Matti Puurtinen; Turkka Mali	110	1
7	Kim Lönnholm	"Minä olen muistanut"	Edu Kettunen	52	7
8	Sonja Lumme	"Rakkauden laulut"	Pepe Willberg; Kirsti Willberg	62	5
9	Cris Owen	"Vad finns kvar"	Cris Owen; Marita Lindquist	103	2
10	Marjorie	"Kahden juhla"	Kaj Westerlund; Ilkka Vesterinen	31	9

Detailed Jury Votes
R/O	Song	Billy Carson	Jody Beveridge	Jyrki Hämäläinen	Raila Kinnunen	Vilma Vainikainen	Heikki Kemppainen	Hanna Reponen	Jouko Konttinen	Benny Törnroos	Maria Hänninen	Kirsi Nevanti	Total
1	"Oi äiti maa"	7	6	4	5	8	12	7	6	5	7	7	74
2	"Kan det vara kärlek"	10	8	3	4	7	10	8	5	5	8	4	72
3	"Hiljaisuutta"	5	4	7	8	5	4	4	8	8	4	5	62
4	"Rauhaton sydän"	3	2	2	2	2	3	2	2	2	3	1	24
5	"Huominen Eurooppa"	1	1	1	6	8	10	1	1	3	2	5	39
6	"La dolce vita"	12	6	12	10	12	2	10	12	10	12	12	110
7	"Minä olen muistanut"	3	4	3	6	5	7	4	6	4	5	5	52
8	"Rakkauden laulut"	4	10	4	7	6	3	5	4	6	6	7	62
9	"Vad finns kvar"	5	12	8	12	8	6	12	10	12	8	10	103
10	"Kahden juhla"	3	2	4	3	2	4	1	3	5	3	1	31

== At Eurovision ==
On the night of the final Saaristo performed 14th in the running order, following Austria and preceding France. Saaristo was accompanied by Anita Pajunen and Jokke Seppälä as backing vocalists, and Antero Jakoila and Bert Karlsson as guitarists. At the close of voting it had received 76 points, placing Finland 7th of the 22 entries, the country's highest placement of the 1980s and best finish since 1975. The Finnish jury awarded its 12 points to Denmark.

=== Voting ===
Points awarded to Finland
Score	Country
12 points	
10 points	France; Israel; Turkey; Yugoslavia
8 points	Ireland
7 points	Spain
6 points	Netherlands
5 points	
4 points	Luxembourg; Sweden
3 points	Austria; Cyprus
2 points	
1 point	Portugal

Points awarded by Finland
Score	Country
12 points	Denmark
10 points	Italy
8 points	Spain
7 points	Yugoslavia
6 points	United Kingdom
5 points	Israel
4 points	Netherlands
3 points	France
2 points	Portugal
1 point	Austria
