= Timur Selçuk =

Turkish musician (1946–2020)

- Born: 2 July 1946; Istanbul, Turkey
- Died: 6 November 2020 (aged 74); Istanbul, Turkey
- Resting place: Zincirlikuyu Cemetery
- Occupations: Composer, conductor, singer
- Children: Hazal Selçuk, Mercan Selçuk
- Parents: Münir Nurettin Selçuk (father); Şehime Erton (mother)

Timur Selçuk (2 July 1946 – 6 November 2020) was a Turkish composer, pianist, singer and conductor.

== Biography ==
One of the greatest Turkish composers, Timur Selçuk was the son of Turkish neo-classical music composer Münir Nurettin Selçuk and actress Şehime Erton. His great-uncle was the Ottoman Grand Vizier Abdurrahman Nurettin Pasha. His younger brother is jazz drummer and composer Selim Selçuk. His older sister was Meral Selçuk who sang with her father in his concerts. Timur Selçuk started playing piano at the age of 5 and gave his first concert at age 7. He completed his high school education at Galatasaray High School and at Istanbul Municipal Conservatory.

Selçuk returned to Turkey after completing his study at the École Normale de Musique de Paris where he majored in composition and conducting. He became a pioneer of political songs in Turkey. With his chansons, he repeatedly stormed the hit lists. He was the founder and the conductor of the Istanbul Chamber Orchestra where he arranged compositions of Turkish and Ottoman composers including Sultan Selim the III, Hacı Arif Bey, Dilhayat Kalfa (first female composer at the Ottoman Empire). He composed a great number of music to film, theater, ballet and opera. Selçuk composed and recorded songs to some of the finest poems in Turkish literature including poetry of Ümit Yaşar Oğuzcan, Orhan Veli Kanık, Faruk Nafiz Çamlıbel and to the poems of poet Nâzım Hikmet. He studied voice for many years with the great opera singer Saadet İkesus Altan. His vocal expression was dynamic ranging from naive, to lyrical, to dramatic and theatrical. Selçuk was known for his humor and temperament on stage as well as with his courageous comments on politics.

He twice participated in the Eurovision Song Contest; in 1975, he conducted the first ever Turkish entry, "Seninle Bir Dakika", that had been composed and arranged by others. 14 years later, in 1989, he returned as composer, lyricist, arranger and conductor for "Bana Bana", that was performed by the group Pan. One of the singers of the group was his daughter Hazal Selçuk. The song finished 21st.

Timur Selçuk taught voice, music theory and piano for 40 years at his school Center for Contemporary Music (Çağdaş Müzik Merkezi) located in Istanbul. In his teachings he combined western music theory with the complex theory of classical Turkish music.

=== Death ===
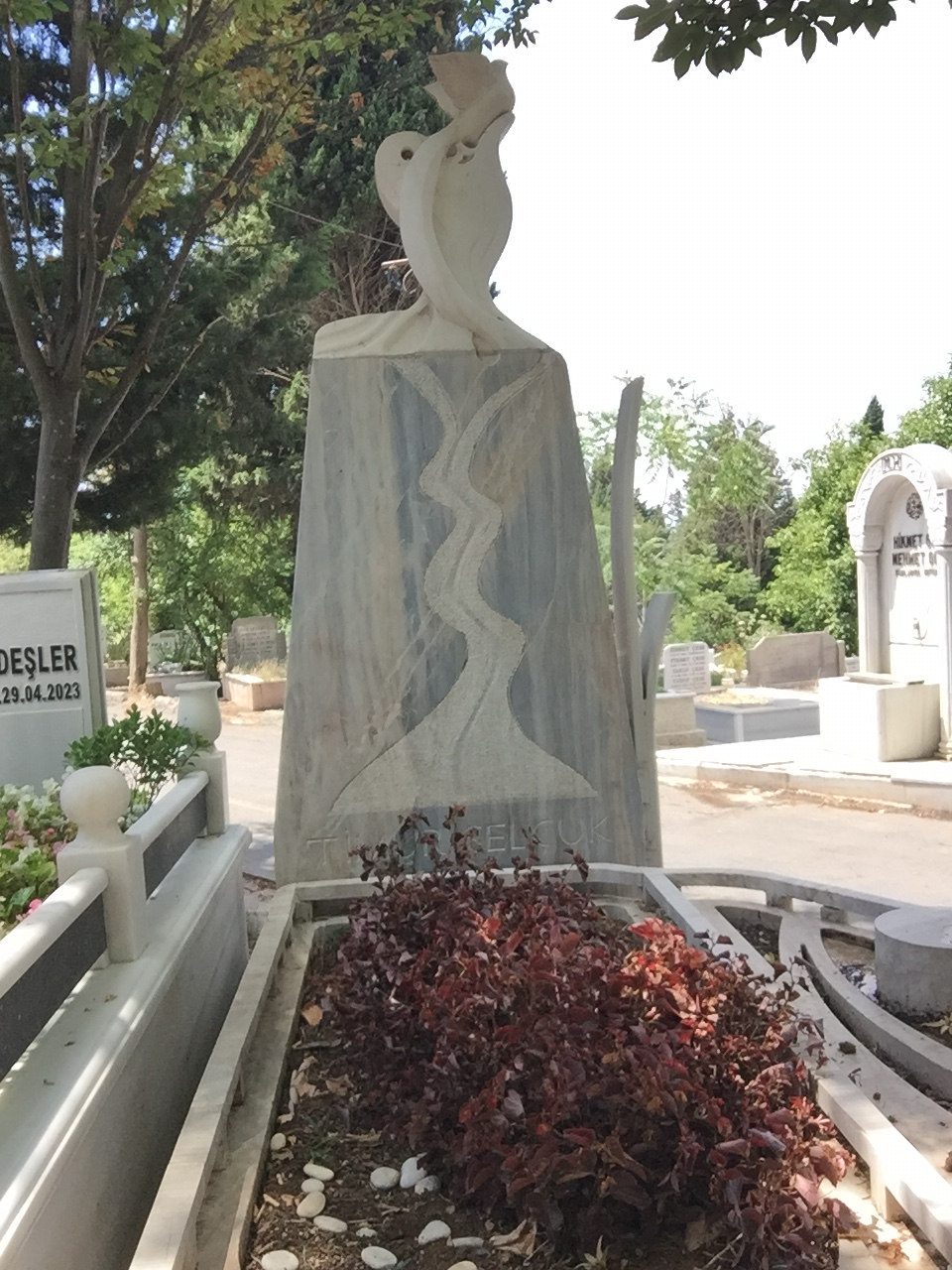
Selçuk's grave in Zincirlikuyu Cemetery.

Timur Selçuk died in his sleep on 6 November 2020, in his daughter Mercan Selçuk's house. He was buried at Zincirlikuyu Cemetery the following day.

== Discography ==
=== Albums ===
- Timur Selçuk ve Orkestrası, Yonce Plak, 1974
- İspanyol Meyhanesi, Philips Plak, 1974
- Timur Selçuk, Yankı Plak, 1977
- Tak Tik, Maral Plak, 1979
- İstanbul Oda Orkestrası eşliğinde; Timur Selçuk, Maral Plak, 1979
- Dünden Bugüne, Balet Plak, 1982
- Timur Selçuk – 3, Balet Plak, 1986
- Bir Uzay Masalı – Pop Opera, Balet Plak, 1991
- 25. Yıl, Balet Plak, 1992
- Seçkiler, Ada Müzik, 2000
- Abdülhamit Düşerken, Balet Plak, 2004
- Babamın Şarkıları, Balet Plak, 2004
- Bedreddin, Balet Plak, 2005

=== 45 records ===
- Ayrılanlar İçin – On Dit, Barclay Plak, 1964
- İnme – Çoban Çeşmesi, Balet Plak, 1969
- Derbeder Ömrüm – Köylü Kızı, Philips Plak, 1970
- Böyledir Akşamları İstanbul'un – Rıhtımda, Philips Plak, 1970
- Viens Regarder Le Soleil, Philips Plak, 1971
- Bugün Yarın Daima – Kadın Kadın, Philips Plak, 1972
- Yaşayamam Sensiz – Sevmek Delilik, Philips Plak, 1972 – 1974
- İspanyol Meyhanesi – Beyaz Güvercin, Philips Plak, 1972
- Duyar mısın? – Kara Sevda, Grafson Plak, 1972
- Sıla Güneşi – Ben Gamlı Hazan Sense Taze Bahar, Yonca Plak, 1972
- Kırık Kalpler – Oy Be Nenem, Yonca Plak, 1973
- Panayır Günü – Yaralı Ceylan, Yonca Plak, 1973
- Sen Nerdesin – Tu Seras Un Concerto, Barclay Plak, 1974
- Hürriyete Doğru – Karantinalı Despina, Grafson Plak, 1974
- Pireli Şarkı – Memet, Yonca Plak, 1975
- Dönek Türküsü – Özgürlük, Yankı Plak, 1978

== Filmography ==
- Eine Saison in Hakkari, (Turkey/Germany), 1982/1983 directed by Erden Kıral
- Vatanyolu (Die Heimreise), (Germany), 1987/1988 by Enis Günay, Rasim Konyar
- Mavi Sürgün (Das blaue Exil), (Turkey/Germany/Greece), 1992/1993 by Erden Kıral

Awards
Preceded by Vladimir Cosma	Golden Boll Award for Best Music Score; 1994 for Mavi Sürgün	Succeeded by not awarded
Preceded by Mazlum Çimen	Golden Orange Award for Best Music Score; 2003 for Abdülhamit Düşerken	Succeeded by Erkan Oğur
