= Marianna Efstratiou =

Greek singer

Maria-Anastasia "Marianna" Efstratiou (Greek: Μαρία-Αναστασία "Μαριάννα" Ευστρατίου; born 17 April 1955 in Athens) is a Greek singer, connected on several occasions with the Eurovision Song Contest. In 1987 she appeared as a backing singer for the duo Bang. Efstratiou won the 1989 Greek national selection (overcoming prior entrant Anna Vissi) and represented Greece in the 1989 contest in Lausanne with "To diko sou asteri", which placed ninth.

In 1996, Greek national broadcaster Hellenic Broadcasting Corporation (ERT) selected her to represent Greece again, this time with the song "Emis forame to himona anixiatika", however the song could only manage 14th place at the 1996 contest in Oslo. In the following years, Efstratiou sang three songs in the semi-finals of the 1998 Greek national final, but none of them qualified to the final. She has worked with Mimis Plessas and she also appeared on stage on several occasions. She has published two records and a promo CD single. Her debut album featured her cover of "Twist in My Sobriety", originally sung by Tanita Tikaram. She has also participated in the theatrical play Pornographia by Manos Hatzidakis. Later she was the lead singer of the jazz ensemble Nova Mood.

== Discography ==
=== Albums ===
- 1982 - Pornografia (music and songs from the play by Manos Hatzidakis.
- 1984 - Big Alice (as a band with Costas Bigalis)
- 1987 - Mariana
- 1989 - Proti fora
- 1992 - Nihta gia duo
- 1993 - Giro apo esena

=== Singles ===
- 1984 - "I Miss You"
- 1985 - "Talk About Love"
- 1989 - "To diko sou asteri"
- 1989 - "Kathe telos einai mia arhi"
- 1996 - "Emis forame to himona anixiatika"
- 2021 - "Pare me mazi sou" (feat. Stereomatic and Meditelectro)

Preceded by Afroditi Frida with Clown	Greece in the Eurovision Song Contest; 1989	Succeeded by Christos Callow & Wave with Horis skopo
Preceded by Elina Konstantopoulou with Pia prosefhi	Greece in the Eurovision Song Contest; 1996	Succeeded by Marianna Zorba with Horepse
