= Switzerland in the Eurovision Song Contest 1989 =

- Eurovision Song Contest 1989
- Participating broadcaster: Swiss Broadcasting Corporation (SRG SSR)
- Country: Switzerland
- Selection process: Concours Eurovision de la Chanson 1989
- Selection date: 18 February 1989

Competing entry
- Song: "Viver senza tei"
- Artist: Furbaz
- Songwriter: Marie Louise Werth

Placement
- Final result: 13th, 47 points

Participation chronology

Switzerland was represented at the Eurovision Song Contest 1989 with the song "Viver senza tei", written by Marie Louise Werth, and performed by Furbaz. The Swiss participating broadcaster, the Swiss Broadcasting Corporation (SRG SSR), selected its entry through a national final. In addition, Télévision suisse romande (TSR), on behalf of the SRG SSR, was the host broadcaster and staged the event at the Palais de Beaulieu in Lausanne, after their win at the previous edition with the song "Ne partez pas sans moi" by Céline Dion. This was the first-ever entry performed in Romansh in the Eurovision Song Contest.

== Before Eurovision ==
=== Regional selections ===
The Swiss Broadcasting Corporation (SRG SSR) held a national final to select its entry for the Eurovision Song Contest 1989. Each division of SRG SSR — Swiss German and Romansh broadcaster Schweizer Fernsehen der deutschen und rätoromanischen Schweiz (SF DRS), Swiss French broadcaster Télévision suisse romande (TSR), and Swiss Italian broadcaster Televisione Svizzera di lingua italiana (TSI) —, used its own method to select its entries for the final. Eligible songs were required to have been composed by songwriters from Switzerland or Liechtenstein, and the deadline for the song registration was on 28 October 1988.

TSR internally selected its three songs for the final out of 51 song submissions. In total, 137 songs were submitted (with 9 being invalid), of which ten were selected: three in French, German, and Italian, and one in Romansh. It is unknown how the remaining regional broadcasters selected their songs.

=== Concours Eurovision de la Chanson 1989 ===
SF DRS staged the national final on 18 February 1989 at 20:10 CET at the Theater Casino in Zug. It was hosted by Raymond Fein. The national final was broadcast on TV DRS (with commentary by Mariano Tschuor), TSR (with commentary by Serge Moisson), and TSI (Note: Broadcast through a second audio programme on TSR) (with Italian commentary). Céline Dion— who won for Switzerland in 1988 — and the Gipsy Line Dancers made guest appearances.

Among the backing vocalists for Ann Lomar's performance was Sandra Simó, who would go on to represent Switzerland in 1991 as a soloist.

Participating entries
Broadcaster	Artist(s)	Song	Songwriter(s)		Language
Broadcaster	Artist(s)	Song	Composer	Lyricist	Language
RTSI	Nadia Goj	"Una canzone per sognare"	Renato Mascetti		Italian
RTSI	Silvana Rezzonico	"Déjà vu"	Daniele Christen		Italian
RTSI	Renato Mascetti	"La voce del mare"	Renato Mascetti		Italian
SF DRS	Carl Nicholas	"Reisefieber"	Karl Niklaus Weber		German
SF DRS	Chris Lorens	"Mutter Erde"	Amanda Hermle		German
SF DRS	Ann Lomar	"Wege in der Nacht"	Tobias Frey	Ueli Schnorf	German
SF DRS	Furbaz	"Viver senza tei"	Marie Louise Werth		Romansh
TSR	Michel Villa	"Sur des musiques qui balancent"	Jean-Jacques Egli		French
TSR	Alexandra	"S'envoler pour ailleurs"	Alexandra Passina		French
TSR	Pierrette Dufaux	"Coup d'assommoir"	Mario Bonny	Yvan Sjöstedt	French

The voting consisted of regional public votes which were sent to the three divisions of SRG SSR (SF DRS, TSR, TSI: German-Romansh, French, and Italian speaking, respectively), a press jury, and an "expert" jury.

The winner was the song "Viver senza tei", composed by Marie Louise Werth and performed by Furbaz. The song received the highest possible score in the selection; 60 total points with 12 points from all five juries, and became the first song in Eurovision to be performed in Romansh.

Participating entries
R/O	Artist(s)	Song	Regional Juries			Press Jury	Expert Jury	Total	Place
R/O	Artist(s)	Song	DRS	TSR	TSI	Press Jury	Expert Jury	Total	Place
1	Michel Villa	"Sur des musiques qui balancent"	8	7	8	7	4	34	4
2	Nadia Goj	"Una canzone per sognare"	7	6	5	8	10	36	3
3	Carl Nicolas	"Reisefieber"	5	5	7	4	7	28	5
4	Alexandra	"S'envoler pour ailleurs"	1	3	1	3	3	11	9
5	Chris Lorens	"Mutter Erde"	10	10	10	10	6	46	2
6	Pierrette Dufaux	"Coup d'assommoir"	3	4	3	2	2	14	8
7	Silvana Rezzonico	"Déjà vu"	2	1	2	1	1	7	10
8	Ann Lomar	"Wege in der Nacht"	6	8	4	5	5	28	5
9	Renato Mascetti	"La voce del mare"	4	2	6	6	8	26	7
10	Furbaz	"Viver senza tei"	12	12	12	12	12	60	1

== At Eurovision ==
At the Eurovision Song Contest 1989, held at the Palais de Beaulieu in Lausanne, the Swiss entry was the eighteenth entry of the night following Cyprus and preceding Greece. The Swiss conductor at the contest was Benoît Kaufman. At the close of voting, Switzerland had received 47 points in total; finishing in thirteenth out of twenty-two countries.

=== Voting ===
Each participating broadcaster assembled a jury panel with at least eleven members. The jurors awarded 1-8, 10, and 12 points to their top ten songs.

Points awarded to Switzerland
Score	Country
12 points	
10 points	Netherlands
8 points	Turkey; United Kingdom
7 points	Iceland
6 points	
5 points	
4 points	Israel; Italy
3 points	Portugal
2 points	Denmark
1 point	Austria

Points awarded by Switzerland
Score	Country
12 points	Greece
10 points	Spain
8 points	Austria
7 points	Israel
6 points	Germany
5 points	Yugoslavia
4 points	Cyprus
3 points	Sweden
2 points	Italy
1 point	Norway
