= Nina (Spanish singer) =

Spanish musical actress and singer

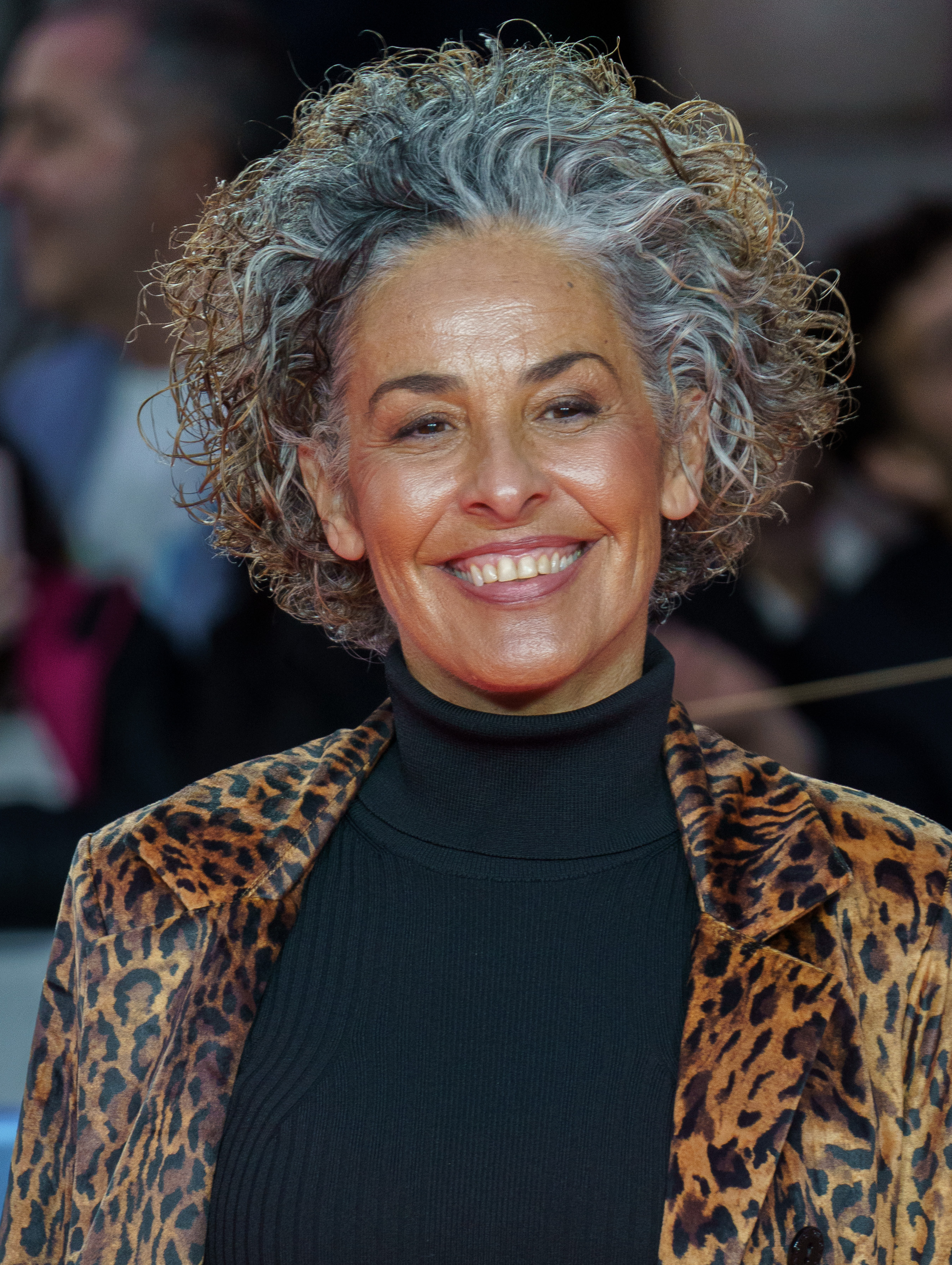
- Nina in 2025

Background information
- Born: Anna María Agustí Flores; 1 October 1966 (age 59); Barcelona, Spain
- Occupation: Singer

Anna María Agustí Flores (born 1 October 1966), known professionally as Nina, is a Spanish singer, vocal coach, and actress. She represent Spain in the Eurovision Song Contest 1989 with the song "Nacida para amar" placing sixth.

== Career ==
Nina started her music career in the 1980s performing with bands like "Costa Brava" or "Xavier Cugat", backed by Catalan musician Xavier Cugat. In 1987, she rose to fame nationwide in the popular Televisión Española (TVE) game show Un, dos, tres... responda otra vez, where she was cast as one of the "secretaries".

She represent Spain in the Eurovision Song Contest 1989 with the song "Nacida para amar", written by Juan Carlos Calderón. She finished in sixth place.

Subsequently, she has worked as an actress in several television series on TV3 and TVE, has also collaborated in radio programmes, and has released records mainly in Catalan language. From 2001 to 2004, she had a prominent role as the "director of the academy" in the first three seasons of the reality talent show series Operación Triunfo; in 2011 she came back as the director of the academy in the eight season of Operación Triunfo, and 2020 she returned as a judge in the eleventh season. In 2018, she participates as a jury and Academy teacher in the Spanish show Pura magia, on its second season.

She has also played in several stage musicals like Las cuatro cartas (1990), Cabaret (1992), Casem-nos una mica (1993), Te odio mi amor (1995), Company (1997), Pierrot Lunaire (1998), Corre, corre Diva (1998), Espai pel somni (1999), Programa Sondheim (2000), the Spanish production of Mamma Mia! (2004–2010, 2015–2017), where she starred as Donna, and Casi normales (2017–2018).

== Discography ==
- Una mujer como yo (1989)
- Rompe el tiempo (1990)
- Començar de zero (1995)
- Corre, corre Diva (1998)
- Espai pel somni (2000)
- Stephen Sondheim (2001)
- Quan somniïs fes-ho en mi (2002)
- 20 anys i una nit (2005)
- Bàsic (2007)
- A prop del mar (2011) – with Port Bo.
- Llegendes del cinema (2013) – with La Simfònica de Cobla i Corda de Catalunya.

== Notable published works ==
- Con voz propia (2016). ISBN 9788416110698

Preceded by La Década Prodigiosa with "La chica que yo quiero (Made in Spain)"	Spain in the Eurovision Song Contest; 1989	Succeeded by Azúcar Moreno with "Bandido"
