= Iceland in the Eurovision Song Contest 1989 =

- Eurovision Song Contest 1989
- Participating broadcaster: Ríkisútvarpið (RÚV)
- Country: Iceland
- Selection process: Söngvakeppni Sjónvarpsins 1989
- Selection date: 30 March 1989

Competing entry
- Song: "Það sem enginn sér"
- Artist: Daníel Ágúst Haraldsson
- Songwriter: Valgeir Guðjónsson

Placement
- Final result: 22nd, 0 points

Participation chronology

Iceland was represented at the Eurovision Song Contest 1989 with the song "Það sem enginn sér", written by Valgeir Guðjónsson, and performed by Daníel Ágúst Haraldsson. The Icelandic participating broadcaster, Ríkisútvarpið (RÚV), selected its entry through Söngvakeppni Sjónvarpsins 1989.

== Before Eurovision ==
=== Söngvakeppni Sjónvarpsins 1989 ===
Ríkisútvarpið (RÚV) held the national final on 30 March 1989 at its studios in Reykjavík, hosted by Jónas R. Jónsson. Five songs competed, which were all shown as pre-recorded video clips, and the winner was chosen by the votes of eight regional juries.

Final – 30 March 1989
R/O	Artist	Song	Points	Place
1	Daníel Ágúst Haraldsson	"Það sem enginn sér"	66	1
2	Jóhanna Linnet	"Þú leiddir mig í ljós"	30	5
3	Ellen Kristjánsdóttir and Mannakorn	"Línudans"	58	2
4	Björgvin Halldórsson and Katla Maria	"Sóley"	44	4
5	Bítlavinafélagið	"Alpatwist"	58	2

Detailed Regional Jury Votes
R/O	Song	West	Westfjords	Northwest	Northeast	East	South	Reykjanes	Reykjavík	Total
1	"Það sem enginn sér"	12	4	6	6	12	6	8	12	66
2	"Þú leiddir mig í ljós"	2	2	2	8	4	4	2	6	30
3	"Línudans"	8	6	4	12	8	12	6	2	58
4	"Sóley"	4	8	8	2	2	8	4	8	44
5	"Alpatwist"	6	12	12	4	6	2	12	4	58

== At Eurovision ==
Ágúst performed 20th on the night of the contest, held in Lausanne, Switzerland, following Greece and preceding Germany. Iceland did not manage to receive any points from all countries, placing 22nd (last) of 22 competing countries. The Icelandic jury awarded its 12 points to Cyprus.

=== Voting ===
Iceland did not receive any points at the Eurovision Song Contest 1989.

Points awarded by Iceland
Score	Country
12 points	Cyprus
10 points	Denmark
8 points	Austria
7 points	Switzerland
6 points	Yugoslavia
5 points	Israel
4 points	Greece
3 points	Germany
2 points	Sweden
1 point	Belgium
