= Lolita Morena =

Swiss beauty pageant titleholder

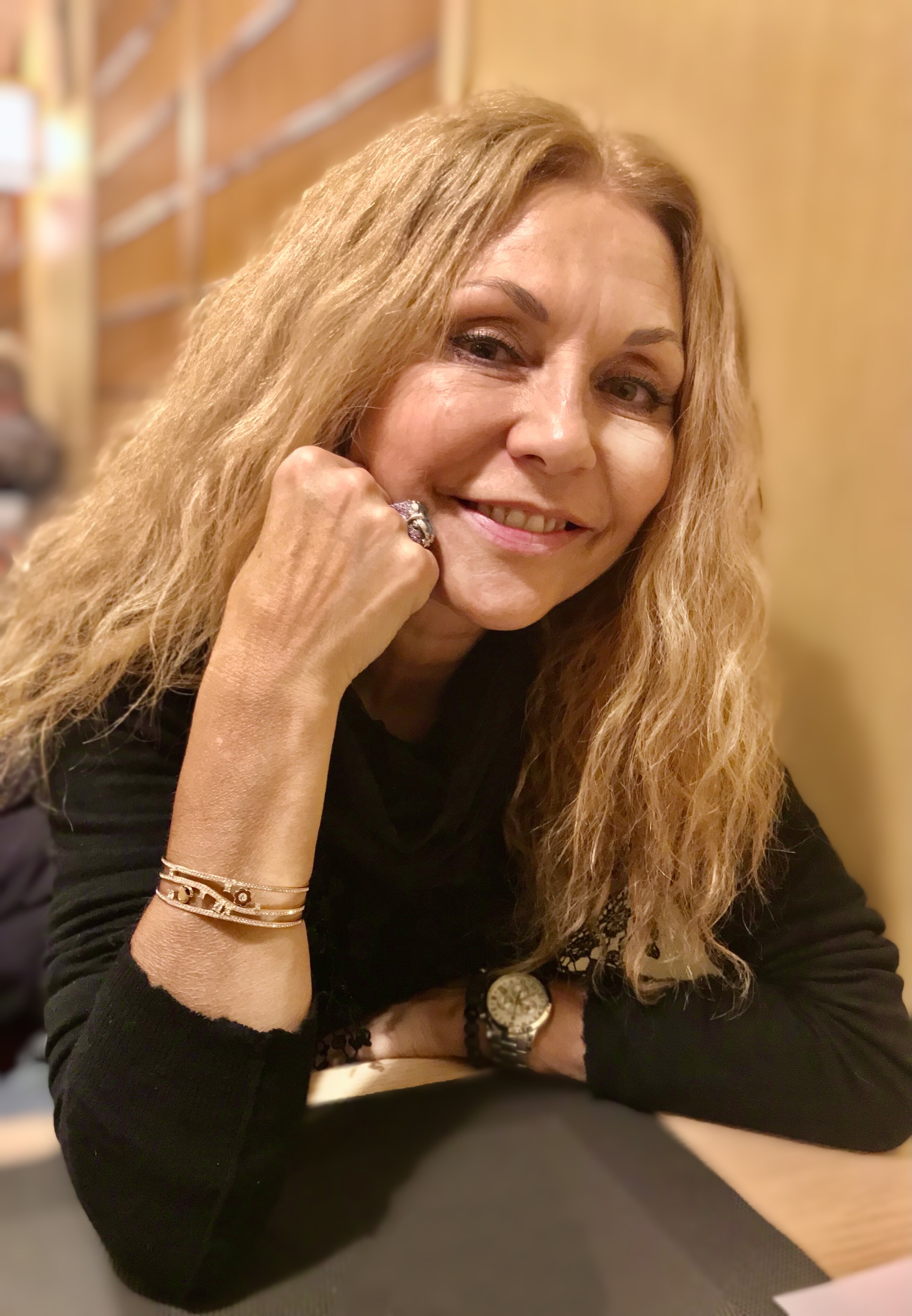
- Morena in 2018
- Born: 15 October 1960 (age 65); Cantiano, Italy
- Education: University of Geneva
- Height: 1.73 m (5 ft 8 in)
- Spouse: Lothar Matthäus (m. 1994; div. 1999)
- Children: 1
- Beauty pageant titleholder
- Title: Miss Switzerland 1982
- Hair color: Brown
- Eye color: Green
- Major competitions: Miss Switzerland 1982 (Winner); Miss World 1982 (Top 7); Miss Universe 1983 (3rd Runner-Up)

Lolita Morena (born 15 October 1960) is an Italian-born Swiss television host and beauty pageant titleholder.

== Miss Switzerland ==
She was a student of Egyptology when she won the Miss Switzerland pageant in 1982. She went on to represent her country at Miss World 1982 and Miss Universe 1983. Coincidentally, she finished as third runner-up and was awarded the Miss Photogenic award in both pageants.

== Personal life ==
Aged 3, Morena emigrated to Switzerland with her mother. Her father died of a heart attack, aged 26. Her mother, Antonia, settled in Bôle and worked in a tobacco factory in Neuchâtel.

From 1987 to 2013 Morena hosted for the Swiss television (TSR) programmes such as “Les Coups de cœur d'Alain Morisod” alongside Jean-Marc Richard. “24 et Gagne”, “Fort Boyard Switzerland” and “Potes à pattes”. She also appeared in the “Piques-Meurons” TV show. She presented the Eurovision Song Contest 1989 with Jacques Deschenaux.

In the early 1990s, Morena also worked for foreign television networks, such as RAI in Italy and ARD in Germany.

In 2009, Morena began hosting “TOUDOU” and “Tierreport” for the PSA (Swiss League in Defense of Animals), for which she’s also the Executive Producer.

In 2021, Morena became Co-President of the Neuchâtel Animal Shelter Foundation.

From 1994 to 1999, Morena was married to German football player Lothar Matthäus with whom she had a son.

== See also ==
- List of Eurovision Song Contest presenters

Awards and achievements
Preceded by (The Bahamas) Ava Marilyn Burke	Miss Universe - Photogenic Award; 1983	Succeeded by (Spain) Garbiñe Abasolo
Preceded by (Australia) Melissa Hannan	Miss World - Photogenic Award; 1982	Succeeded by (Socialist Federal Republic of Yugoslavia) Bernarda Marovt
Preceded by Brigitte Voss	Miss Switzerland; 1982–1983	Succeeded by Silvia Anna Affolter
Media offices
Preceded by (Republic of Ireland) Pat Kenny and Michelle Rocca	Eurovision Song Contest presenter (with Jacques Deschenaux); 1989	Succeeded by (Socialist Federal Republic of Yugoslavia) Helga Vlahović and Oliver Mlakar
