= Rock Me (Riva song) =

1989 song by Riva

Single by Riva

from the album Riva
- Language: Croatian
- Released: 1989
- Label: Jugoton
- Composer: Rajko Dujmić
- Lyricist: Stevo Cvikić

Eurovision Song Contest 1989 entry
- Country: Yugoslavia
- Artists: Emilija Kokić; Boško Colić; Dalibor Musap; Nenad Nakić; Zvonimir Zrilić
- As: Riva
- Language: Croatian
- Composer: Rajko Dujmić
- Lyricist: Stevo Cvikić
- Conductor: Nikica Kalogjera

Finals performance
- Final result: 1st
- Final points: 137

Entry chronology
- ◄ "Mangup" (1988)
- "Hajde da ludujemo" (1990) ►

Official performance video
- "Rock Me" on YouTube

"Rock Me" is a song recorded by Croatian pop band Riva with music composed by Rajko Dujmić and lyrics written by Stevo Cvikić. It represented Yugoslavia in the Eurovision Song Contest 1989, held in Lausanne, resulting in the country's only ever win at the contest.

== Background ==
=== Conception ===
"Rock Me" was composed by Rajko Dujmić with Croatian lyrics by Stevo Cvikić. In addition to the Croatian-language version, Riva recorded an English-language version with lyrics also by Cvikić.

=== Eurovision ===
On 4 March 1989, "Rock Me" performed by Riva in Croatian, and representing Televizija Zagreb (TVZg), competed in the 28th edition of Jugovizija, the national final organised by the Yugoslav Radio Television (JRT) to select its song and performer for the 34th edition of the Eurovision Song Contest. The song won the competition, so it became the Yugoslavian entry –and Riva the performers– for Eurovision.

On 6 May 1989, the Eurovision Song Contest was held at the Palais de Beaulieu in Lausanne hosted by Télévision suisse romande (TSR) on behalf of the Swiss Broadcasting Corporation (SRG SSR), and broadcast live throughout the continent. Riva performed the Croatian-language version of "Rock Me" twenty-second and last on the evening, following Germany's "Flieger" by Nino de Angelo. Nikica Kalogjera conducted the event's live orchestra in the performance of the Yugoslavian entry.

At the close of voting, it had received 137 points, placing first and winning the contest. In their winning reprise the group's lead vocalist Emilija Kokić sang the song in English. This is the country's only ever win at the contest. The song was succeeded as winner in 1990 by "Insieme: 1992" performed by Toto Cutugno representing Italy. It was succeeded as Yugoslav entrant that year by "Hajde da ludujemo" performed by Tajči.

=== Aftermath ===
The song's victory led to international awareness of Yugoslav and Croatian rock. Riva's frontwoman Kokić continued to appear in various shows but had no significant success after the 1989 victory.

== Charts ==
Chart (1989)	Peak position
Belgium (Ultratop 50 Flanders)	16
Netherlands (Single Top 100)	56

Preceded by "Ne partez pas sans moi" by Celine Dion	Eurovision Song Contest winners 1989	Succeeded by "Insieme: 1992" by Toto Cutugno
