= Sweden in the Eurovision Song Contest 1989 =

- Eurovision Song Contest 1989
- Participating broadcaster: Sveriges Television (SVT)
- Country: Sweden
- Selection process: Melodifestivalen 1989
- Selection date: 11 March 1989

Competing entry
- Song: "En dag"
- Artist: Tommy Nilsson
- Songwriters: Tim Norell; Ola Håkansson; Alexander Bard

Placement
- Final result: 4th, 110 points

Participation chronology

Sweden was represented at the Eurovision Song Contest 1989 with the song "En dag", written by Tim Norell, Ola Håkansson, and Alexander Bard, and performed by Tommy Nilsson. The Swedish participating broadcaster, Sveriges Television (SVT), selected its entry through Melodifestivalen 1989.

== Before Eurovision ==
=== Melodifestivalen 1989 ===
Melodifestivalen 1989 was the selection for the 29th song to represent Sweden at the Eurovision Song Contest. It was the 28th time that this system of picking a song had been used. 1,223 songs were submitted to Sveriges Television (SVT) for the competition. The hostess, Yvonne Ryding, was the Miss Universe 1984. The final was held in the Globe Arena in Stockholm on 11 March 1989, was broadcast on SVT1 and was not broadcast on radio. The show was watched by 5,328,000 people.

| R/O | Artist | Song | Songwriter(s) | Points | Place |
|---|---|---|---|---|---|
| 1 | Lili & Sussie | "Okey okey" | Tim Norell; Ola Håkansson | 67 | 5 |
| 2 | Catrin Olsson | "När stormen går" | Andreas Nilsson; Staffan Odenhall | 21 | 9 |
| 3 | True Blue | "Jorden är din" | Tomas Ledin; Lars Andersson | 19 | 10 |
| 4 | Visitors and Sofia Källgren | "Världen är vår" | Göran Danielsson; Svante Persson | 50 | 7 |
| 5 | Eriksson-Glenmark | "Upp över mina öron" | Thomas 'Orup' Eriksson; Anders Glenmark | 108 | 2 |
| 6 | Tommy Nilsson | "En dag" | Tim Norell; Ola Håkansson; Alexander Bard | 113 | 1 |
| 7 | Lisa Nilsson | "Du (öppnar min värld)" | Ingela 'Pling' Forsman; Bobby Ljunggren; Håkan Almqvist | 74 | 4 |
| 8 | Fingerprints | "Mitt ibland änglar" | Thomas 'Orup' Eriksson; Anders Glenmark | 80 | 3 |
| 9 | Haakon Pedersen and Elisabeth Berg | "Nattens drottning" | Ingela 'Pling' Forsman; Lasse Holm | 67 | 5 |
| 10 | Cajsa Bergström | "Genom eld" | Ulf Söderberg | 39 | 8 |

Voting
| R/O | Song | Luleå | Umeå | Sundsvall | Falun | Örebro | Karlstad | Gothenburg | Malmö | Växjö | Norrköping | Stockholm | Total |
|---|---|---|---|---|---|---|---|---|---|---|---|---|---|
| 1 | "Okey okey" | 5 | 6 | 6 | 7 | 8 | 5 | 8 | 5 | 6 | 5 | 6 | 67 |
| 2 | "När stormen går" | 2 | 2 | 2 | 2 | 3 | 2 | 1 | 1 | 2 | 2 | 2 | 21 |
| 3 | "Jorden är din" | 1 | 1 | 4 | 1 | 1 | 1 | 2 | 3 | 1 | 1 | 3 | 19 |
| 4 | "Världen är vår" | 7 | 4 | 5 | 3 | 6 | 4 | 5 | 4 | 4 | 3 | 5 | 50 |
| 5 | "Upp över mina öron" | 10 | 10 | 8 | 10 | 10 | 12 | 12 | 10 | 12 | 6 | 8 | 108 |
| 6 | "En dag" | 12 | 8 | 12 | 12 | 7 | 10 | 10 | 12 | 8 | 12 | 10 | 113 |
| 7 | "Du (öppnar min värld)" | 8 | 7 | 7 | 4 | 4 | 6 | 3 | 8 | 7 | 8 | 12 | 74 |
| 8 | "Mitt ibland änglar" | 4 | 5 | 10 | 6 | 12 | 8 | 7 | 7 | 10 | 4 | 7 | 80 |
| 9 | "Nattens drottning" | 6 | 12 | 3 | 8 | 5 | 7 | 6 | 6 | 3 | 10 | 1 | 67 |
| 10 | "Genom eld" | 3 | 3 | 1 | 5 | 2 | 3 | 4 | 2 | 5 | 7 | 4 | 39 |

== At Eurovision ==
The song was drawn #10 at the contest in Lausanne, Switzerland. It scored very well, receiving a total of 110 points, making Sweden finish 4th, only 1 point behind their 3rd-placed neighbour Denmark.

=== Voting ===
Points awarded to Sweden
| Score | Country |
|---|---|
| 12 points | Austria; Denmark; Yugoslavia |
| 10 points | |
| 8 points | Cyprus; Germany; Greece; Norway; Portugal |
| 7 points | |
| 6 points | Belgium; Israel; Luxembourg |
| 5 points | Spain |
| 4 points | United Kingdom |
| 3 points | Switzerland |
| 2 points | France; Iceland |
| 1 point | |

Points awarded by Sweden
| Score | Country |
|---|---|
| 12 points | Denmark |
| 10 points | United Kingdom |
| 8 points | Yugoslavia |
| 7 points | Austria |
| 6 points | Germany |
| 5 points | Israel |
| 4 points | Finland |
| 3 points | Portugal |
| 2 points | Norway |
| 1 point | France |
