= Gast Waltzing =

Luxembourgish trumpeter and composer (born 1956)

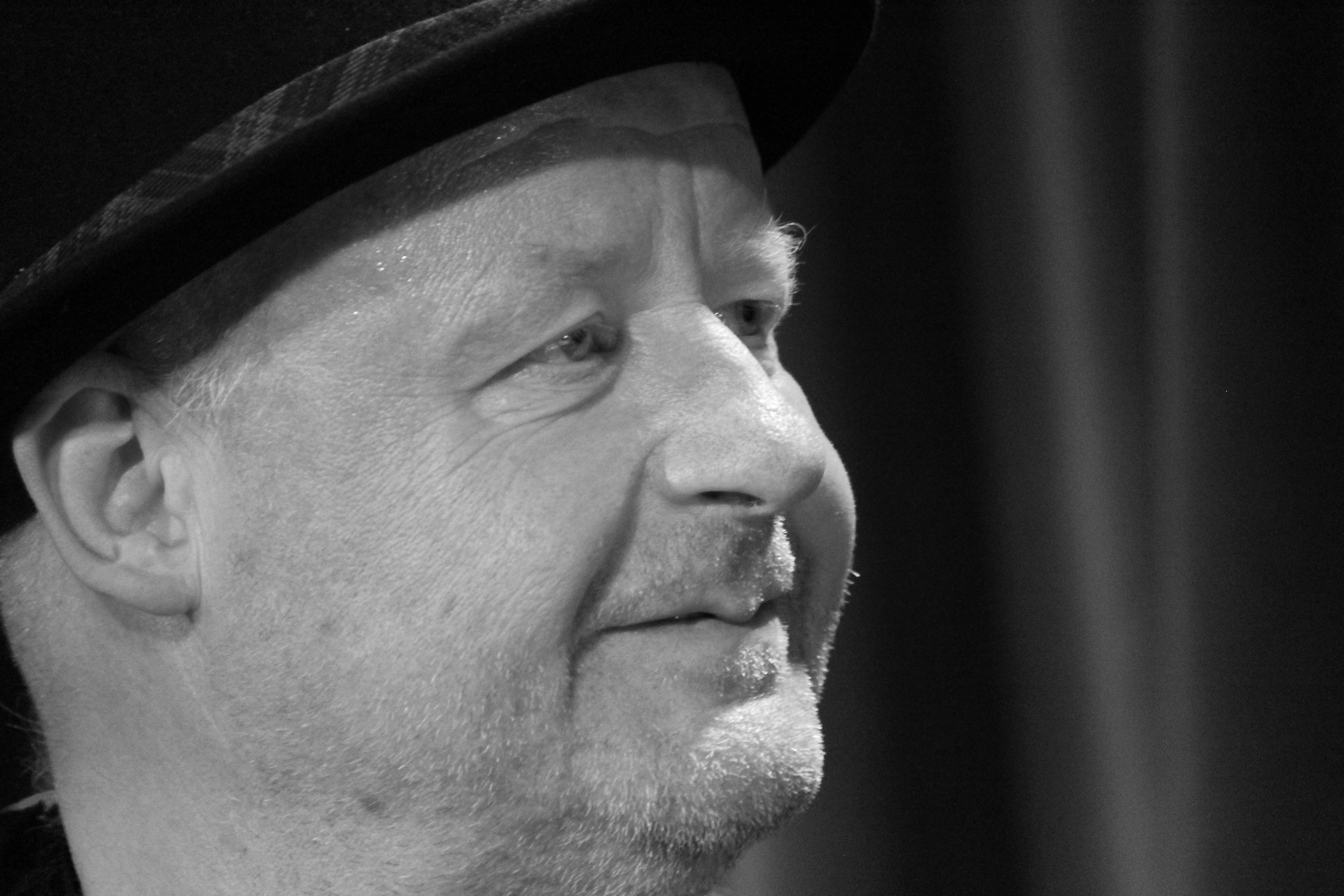
Gast Waltzing in 2014

Gaston "Gast" Waltzing (born 1956) is a Luxembourgish trumpeter and composer. He has created several jazz bands, including Largo and the Luxembourg National Jazz Orchestra, and has even composed music for films and television programs as well as operas combining classical music with jazz and rock. He goes by the nickname of piu.

== Biography ==
Gast Waltzing was born in the city of Luxembourg on 13 August 1956. He began his music studies at the Conservatoire de Luxembourg when he was just 7 years old. He continued his classical training at the Brussels Royal Conservatoire, completing his studies at the Conservatoire de Paris.

In 1982, he became professor of trumpet at the Luxembourg Conservatoire and in 1986 founded the school's Jazz Department, which he heads. He has recorded numerous albums covering classical, jazz and dance, with groups such as "Atmosphere", "Life's Circle" "Largo", all of which he created himself. As a composer, he has recorded music for the Luxembourg film A Wop Bop A Lop Bop (1989), as well as for television. The TV film The Way to Dusty Death provided an opportunity for him to compose his first orchestral movie score. Since then, he has continued to write for orchestra and has worked closely with the Luxembourg Philharmonic Orchestra, for which he has conducted the "Pops At The Phil" programmes featuring singers such as Dionne Warwick, Maurane and James Morrison. All in all, he has written over 150 scores for television and movies.

Waltzing represented Luxembourg in the Eurovision Song Contest 1989 as part of the group Park Café with the song Monsieur, placing 20th with eight points.

In 2004, he founded WPR Records, which sets out to promote young musicians and has featured the Luxembourg National Jazz Orchestra. In 2008, Waltzing was appointed jazz director at the Echternach International Music Festival.

== Awards ==
- 1989: Nomination for Best Composer, European Film Awards for A Wopbobaloobop a Lopbamboom
- 1997: Deutscher Filmpreis (Musik)
- 2005: Lëtzebuerger Filmpräis for "George and the Dragon"
- 2016: (together with Angélique Kidjo and the Orchestre philharmonique du Luxembourg): Grammy Award for the best World Music Album (Sings; 2015)

== Film music (selection) ==
- A Wopbopaloobop A Lopbamboom (1989) by Andy Bausch
- Three Shake-a-leg Steps to Heaven (1993) by Andy Bausch
- Rotwang Must Go! (1994) by Hans-Christoph Blumenberg
- Back in Trouble (1997) by Andy Bausch
- Une nuit de cafard (1999) by Jacques Donjean (short)
- New World Disorder (1999) by Richard Spence
- Tödliche Formel (2001) by Tom Kinninmont
- The Point Men (2001) by John Glen
- Os Imortais (2003) by António-Pedro Vasconcelos
- George and the Dragon (2004) by Tom Reeve
- Psyclist (2006) by Mike Tereba

=== TV series and films ===
- Ex & Hopp (1991) by Andy Bausch
- Die Männer vom K3 – Tanz auf dem Seil (1993) by Andy Bausch
- Die Männer vom K3 – Keine Chance zu gewinnen (1994) by Andy Bausch
- The Way to Dusty Death (1995) by Geoffrey Reeve
- Zwei Brüder – Nervenkrieg (1997) by Hans-Christoph Blumenberg
- Küstenwache (born 1997) by Marco Serafini
- Der Schnapper: Blumen für den Mörder (1998) by Vadim Glowna
- Polizeiruf 110 – Discokiller (1998) by Marco Serafini
- Polizeiruf 110 – Kurschatten (2001) by Marco Serafini
- Polizeiruf 110 – Doktorspiele (2003) by Marco Serafini
- Utta Danella – Eine Liebe in Venedig (2005) by Marco Serafini
- Polizeiruf 110 – Die Tote aus der Saale (2005) by Marco Serafini
