= Furbaz =

Swiss vocal group

Furbaz are a Swiss vocal group consisting of members Marie Louise Werth, Giusep Quinter, Ursin Defuns and Gion Defuns, who perform mainly in the Romansh language. The group was formed in 1983 in Disentis, Graubünden, remaining active until the early 1990s. They then reunited in 2004, and continue performing together. Furbaz are best known internationally for their participation in the Eurovision Song Contest 1989.

== Eurovision Song Contest ==
Furbaz first took part in the Swiss Eurovision selection in 1987 as a sextet, finishing third with "Da cumpignia". They tried again the following year as a quintet, coming second (behind Celine Dion) with "Sentiments". Their third entry in the 1989 selection, this time as a quartet, "Viver senza tei" ("To Live Without You"), ended in victory, with the group going on to represent Switzerland in the 34th Eurovision Song Contest. As a result of Celine Dion's Eurovision victory the previous year, the 1989 contest was held on home ground in Lausanne on 6 May, when "Viver senza tei" finished in 13th place of the 22 entries. The song is the only Eurovision entry to date sung in Romansh.

== Current career ==
Since re-forming in 2004, Furbaz have specialised in performing Christmas music and are most active at that time of year. They have recorded three Christmas-themed albums, Nadal, Weihnachten and Messadi da Nadal.

Awards and achievements
Preceded by Celine Dion with "Ne partez pas sans moi"	Switzerland in the Eurovision Song Contest; 1989	Succeeded by Egon Egemann with "Musik klingt in die Welt hinaus"
