= Riva (band) =

Croatian pop band

- Origin: Zadar, SR Croatia, Yugoslavia
- Genres: Pop
- Years active: 1986–1991, 1993–2016
- Past members: Emilija Kokić; Dalibor Musap; Nenad Nakić; Zvonimir Zrilić; Boško Colić

Riva was a Croatian pop band formed in Zadar in 1986.

== History ==
After forming in 1986, the band appeared on Zagrebfest 1988, Performing with the song "Zadnja Suza" ("Last Tear" in Croatian).

Their song "Rock Me" won the Eurovision Song Contest 1989 in Switzerland, with a score of 137 points. According to author John Kennedy O'Connor in The Eurovision Song Contest – The Official History, it was an unexpected win. The band brought the first and only victory for Yugoslavia. The contest was then hosted in Zagreb, representing Yugoslav Radio Television.

After the success, they released two subsequent albums, one titled after their winning track "Rock Me" (1989) and "Srce Laneta" ("Deer Fawn's Heart" in Croatian) in 1990.

Shortly after the success of both albums, the band signed to a Swiss Agency where they started production on their planned 3rd album titled "Lude Glave, Lude Godine" ("Crazy Heads, Crazy Years" in Croatian) with Per Gessle of popular pop rock duo Roxette to be featured with whom they were supposed to be opening acts for on a world tour.

Disagreements arose when the Swiss Agency misrepresented the validity of Croatia as a then recently independent country, opting for the band to remain as being from Yugoslavia for press purposes as well as the bands performances focusing on humanitarian issues in Croatia to help victims of the Yugoslav Wars.

Feeling betrayed by the agency's portrayal of what was happening in their hometown at the time the members cut all ties with the agency, with frontwoman Emilija Kokić stating in a 2019 interview :

"We come from Zadar, our families are huddled in basements because grenades of the Serbian army are falling on Zadar, and we would act like Yugoslavians How? That would be the biggest betrayal! They would become people to whom a career means more than anything".

After the resignation, the planned album which was scheduled for release remained unreleased with only 3 songs from the album being available from their performance at the Croatian Eurovision preselection Dora in 1993.

During 1991 the band decided to have a hiatus originally planned to be short, which ended up being the end of Riva as members focused on their own personal lives with only very few small reunions taking place between 1993 and 2016.

== Personnel ==
- Emilija Kokić – vocals
- Dalibor Musap – vocals, keyboards, establisher and leader of the group RIVA
- Nenad Nakić – vocals, bass
- Zvonimir Zrilić – guitars, vocals
- Boško Colić – drums

== Citations ==
Awards and achievements
Preceded by (Switzerland) Céline Dion with "Ne partez pas sans moi"	Winner of the Eurovision Song Contest; 1989	Succeeded by (Italy) Toto Cutugno with "Insieme: 1992"
Preceded by Srebrna Krila with "Mangup"	Yugoslavia in the Eurovision Song Contest; 1989	Succeeded by Tajči with "Hajde da ludujemo"
