= Norway in the Eurovision Song Contest 1989 =

- Eurovision Song Contest 1989
- Participating broadcaster: Norsk rikskringkasting (NRK)
- Country: Norway
- Selection process: Melodi Grand Prix 1989
- Selection date: 11 March 1989

Competing entry
- Song: "Venners nærhet"
- Artist: Britt Synnøve Johansen
- Songwriters: Inge Enoksen; Leiv Grøtte

Placement
- Final result: 17th, 30 points

Participation chronology

Norway was represented at the Eurovision Song Contest 1989 with the song "Venners nærhet", composed by Inge Enoksen, with lyrics by Leiv Grøtte, and performed by Britt Synnøve Johansen. The Norwegian participating broadcaster, Norsk rikskringkasting (NRK), selected its entry through the Melodi Grand Prix 1989.

== Before Eurovision ==
=== Melodi Grand Prix 1989 ===
Norsk rikskringkasting (NRK) held the Melodi Grand Prix 1989 at the Forum in Stavanger, hosted by Øystein Bache. Nine songs took part in the televised final, of which three songs were selected for a "super final". The winner was decided by a five-way jury; an expert jury made up of professional musicians, a press jury, and three public juries split by age group. Other participants included Kate Gulbrandsen (who represented Norway in 1987), three-time Norwegian representative and MGP regular Jahn Teigen and Tor Endresen, who would represent Norway in 1997.

The evening had its controversies, as fan favorite Jahn Teigen failed to reach the super final, which was met by booing from the audience.

Final – 11 March 1989
R/O	Artist	Song	Songwriter(s)	Result
1	Heidi Halvorsen	"Beat for Beat"	Harald Græsdahl; Tore Holm	—N/a
2	Tor Endresen	"Til det gryr av dag"	Oddvar Ruud; Marit Vollen	Qualified
3	Britt Synnøve Johansen	"Venners nærhet"	Inge Enoksen; Leiv Grøtte	Qualified
4	Rune Rudberg	"Vinger over Europa"	Nick Borgen; Arve Sigvaldsen	—N/a
5	Ingeborg Hungnes	"En lite lys"	Svein Gundersen; Stig Nilsson	Qualified
6	Ola Fjellvikås	"Min Mona Lisa"	Rolf Graf	—N/a
7	Kari Gjærum and Jannecke Øinæs	"Barneøyne"	Robert Morley; Eva Jansen	—N/a
8	Jahn Teigen	"Optimist"	Jahn Teigen; Knut Meiner; Ove Borøchstein	—N/a
9	Kate Gulbrandsen	"Nærhet"	Kate Gulbrandsen; Rolf Løvland	—N/a

Superfinal – 11 March 1989
R/O	Artist	Song	Public Jury			Press Jury	Expert Jury	Total	Place
R/O	Artist	Song	15-30	30-45	45-60	Press Jury	Expert Jury	Total	Place
1	Tor Endresen	"Til det gryr av dag"	11	16	14	9	7	57	2
2	Britt Synnøve Johansen	"Venners nærhet"	12	11	11	10	18	62	1
3	Ingeborg Hungnes	"En lite lys"	12	8	10	16	10	56	3

== At Eurovision ==
On the night of the final Synnøve performed 8th in the running order, following the United Kingdom and preceding Portugal. Although "Venners nærhet" had been tipped as a likely top 10 contender, at the close of voting it had picked up only 30 points, placing Norway a disappointing 17th of the 22 entries. The Norwegian jury awarded its 12 points to the United Kingdom.

=== Voting ===
Points awarded to Norway
Score	Country
12 points	
10 points	
8 points	Belgium
7 points	
6 points	Denmark
5 points	Turkey
4 points	France
3 points	
2 points	Israel; Netherlands; Sweden
1 point	Switzerland

Points awarded by Norway
Score	Country
12 points	United Kingdom
10 points	Denmark
8 points	Sweden
7 points	Yugoslavia
6 points	Greece
5 points	France
4 points	Spain
3 points	Ireland
2 points	Belgium
1 point	Portugal
