= Michelle Rocca =

Irish model and television presenter

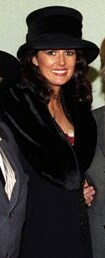
- Rocca in 1995
- Born: Michelle Mary Teresa Rocca; 1961 (age 64–65); Dublin, Ireland
- Children: 5
- Beauty pageant titleholder
- Title: Miss Ireland 1980
- Major competitions: Miss Ireland 1980 (Winner); Miss International 1981 (2nd runner-up); Miss World 1980 (Unplaced)

Michelle Mary Teresa Rocca (born 1961) is an Irish TV presenter, former model and beauty pageant titleholder who won Miss Ireland 1980. The following year, she married footballer John Devine. Two years after their divorce in 1990 she met and later married, Northern Irish singer Van Morrison.

== Career ==
Rocca grew up in a large family with two brothers and three sisters. Rocca attended University College Dublin studying Greek and Roman Civilization, as well as Italian and French Archaeology. She is fluent in several languages and has earned an MA degree from Trinity College in Dublin and also a degree from Bristol University.

She was named Miss Ireland in 1980 and was the number 3 finalist in the Miss International 1981 pageant. She worked in the family business and also modelled until she joined RTÉ in 1987 as a television presenter. In 1988, she co-hosted the Eurovision Song Contest 1988 with Pat Kenny in front of a worldwide audience of 600 million viewers. She continued to model, with occasional presenting jobs, such as the Miss World 1990 contest in London.

Rocca later became a psychology and motivational teacher with a master's degree in philosophy and English.

== Personal life ==
Rocca is the daughter of Paddy and Maureen Rocca, and granddaughter of Italian immigrant Egidio Rocca.

Rocca began dating Arsenal and Irish International footballer John Devine when she was 17, and they were married in 1981 and lived in England. The couple had two daughters. They separated in 1987, and she returned to Dublin with the children. They divorced in 1990. She was engaged to Cathal Ryan, son of multi-millionaire Tony Ryan who co-founded Ryanair and owned Guinness Peat Aviation. After living together for two years, they separated when Michelle was expecting their child, who was born in April 1991. Upon Cathal Ryan's death in December 2007 of cancer, Rocca was quoted as saying, "He was a wonderful father to Claudia; he and I had a very good relationship over the past number of years and he will be greatly missed by all of us."

Rocca met Northern Irish singer-songwriter Van Morrison in the summer of 1992. They married in the mid-1990s and divorced on 24 March 2018. They have two children, Aibhe and Fionn Ivan. She was the second woman to appear on one of Morrison's album covers—1995's Days Like This. The first was Morrison's first wife Janet "Planet" Rigsbee, who appeared on the cover of 1971's Tupelo Honey. Rocca also appeared on the cover of the October 1994 tribute album, No Prima Donna: The Songs of Van Morrison.

Rocca has five children.

== See also ==
- List of Eurovision Song Contest presenters

== Sources ==
- Rogan, Johnny (2006): Van Morrison : No Surrender, London:Vintage Books ISBN 978-0-09-943183-1
- Where Are They Now?, Irish Examiner, 30 August 1999

Awards and achievements
Preceded by (Austria) Karin Zorn	Miss World - Photogenic; 1980	Succeeded by (Australia) Melissa Hannan
Preceded by Maura McMenamim	Miss Ireland; 1980	Succeeded by Geraldine Mary McGrory
Media offices
Preceded by (Belgium) Viktor Lazlo	Eurovision Song Contest presenter (with Pat Kenny); 1988	Succeeded by (Switzerland) Jacques Deschenaux and Lolita Morena
Preceded by Ronan Collins	Eurovision Song Contest Ireland commentator (with Ronan Collins); 1989	Succeeded by Jimmy Greeley and Clíona Ní Bhuachalla
