= Luxembourg in the Eurovision Song Contest 1989 =

- Eurovision Song Contest 1989
- Participating broadcaster: Compagnie Luxembourgeoise de Télédiffusion (CLT)
- Country: Luxembourg
- Selection process: Artist: Internal selection Song: National final
- Selection date: Artist: 10 February 1989; Song: 5–6 March 1989

Competing entry
- Song: "Monsieur"
- Artist: Park Café
- Songwriters: Maggie Parke; Gast Waltzing; Yves Lacomblez; Bernard Loncheval

Placement
- Final result: 20th, 8 points

Participation chronology

Luxembourg was represented at the Eurovision Song Contest 1989 with the song "Monsieur", written by Maggie Parke, Gast Waltzing, Yves Lacomblez, and Bernard Loncheval, and performed by the band Park Café. The Luxembourgish participating broadcaster, the Compagnie Luxembourgeoise de Télédiffusion (CLT), selected its entry through a national final, after having previously selected the performer internally.

CLT organised a three-song national final in order to select Park Café's song and "Monsieur" emerged as the winning song following a public televote held via television and radio on 5 and 6 March 1989.

Luxembourg competed in the Eurovision Song Contest which took place on 6 May 1989. Performing during the show in position 11, Luxembourg placed twentieth out of the 22 participating countries, scoring 8 points.

== Background ==
Prior to the 1989 contest, the Compagnie Luxembourgeoise de Télédiffusion (CLT) had participated in the Eurovision Song Contest representing Luxembourg thirty-three times since debuting in its first edition of 1956. It had won the contest on five occasions: in 1961 with "Nous les amoureux" performed by Jean-Claude Pascal, in 1965 with "Poupée de cire, poupée de son" performed by France Gall, in 1972 with "Après toi" performed by Vicky Leandros, in 1973 with "Tu te reconnaîtras" performed by Anne-Marie David, and finally in 1983 with "Si la vie est cadeau" performed by Corinne Hermès.

As part of its duties as participating broadcaster, CLT organises the selection of its entry in the Eurovision Song Contest and broadcasts the event in the country. The Luxembourgish entries since 1979 have been selected internally by CLT. For the 1989 contest, the broadcaster opted to internally select the artist and organise a national final to select the song.

== Before Eurovision ==
=== Artist selection ===
On 10 February 1989, CLT announced that it had internally selected the band Park Café to represent Luxembourg in Lausanne. It was later announced that a national final would be held to select the song Park Café would perform.

=== National final ===
12 songs were submitted by Park Café to CLT which selected three of them for the national final. Video recordings of Park Café performing the three competing songs were presented during the 5 March 1989 edition of the television programme Hei elei, kuck elei, broadcast on RTL Canal 21 at 13:00 (CET) and hosted by Jean Octave and Manette Dupong, with the public able to vote for their favourite song through televoting during the show. The three songs were also presented via radio on RTL 92.5 on 6 March 1989 where an additional round of televoting was held. The combination of votes received during both voting rounds resulted in the selection of "Monsieur" as the winning song.

Final – 5–6 March 1989
R/O	Song	Songwriter(s)	Televote			Place
R/O	Song	Songwriter(s)	TV	Radio	Total	Place
1	"Chaque fois"	Maggie Parke, Gast Waltzing, Yves Lacomblez, Bernard Loncheval	405	320	725	3
2	"Je l'aime"	Maggie Parke, Gast Waltzing, Scholtes	295	573	868	2
3	"Monsieur"	Maggie Parke, Gast Waltzing, Yves Lacomblez, Bernard Loncheval	1,381	1,042	2,423	1

== At Eurovision ==
The Eurovision Song Contest 1989 took place on 6 May 1989 at Hall 7 of the Palais de Beaulieu in Lausanne, Switzerland. On 23 November 1988, an allocation draw was held which determined the running order and Luxembourg was set to perform in position 11, following the entry from Sweden and before the entry from Denmark.

In Luxembourg, the contest was broadcast on RTL Télévision. The Luxembourgish conductor at the contest was Benoît Kaufman and Luxembourg finished in 20th place, scoring 8 points. The Luxembourgish jury awarded its 12 points to the United Kingdom.

=== Voting ===
Points awarded to Luxembourg
Score	Country
12 points	
10 points	
8 points	
7 points	
6 points	
5 points	France
4 points	
3 points	Spain
2 points	
1 point	

Points awarded by Luxembourg
Score	Country
12 points	United Kingdom
10 points	Spain
8 points	France
7 points	Portugal
6 points	Sweden
5 points	Yugoslavia
4 points	Finland
3 points	Denmark
2 points	Ireland
1 point	Netherlands
