= Nathalie Pâque =

Belgian singer

- Born: Nathalie Dominique Françoise Pâque; 11 May 1977 (age 49); Liège, Belgium
- Genres: Pop
- Occupation: Singer

Nathalie Dominique Françoise Pâque (born 11 May 1977) is a Belgian singer, best known for her participation on behalf of France in the Eurovision Song Contest 1989.

Pâque was internally selected by channel Antenne 2 to represent France with the song "J'ai volé la vie" ("I've Stolen Life") in the Eurovision Song Contest 1989, held in Lausanne, Switzerland on 6 May. At five days short of her 12th birthday, Pâque was the youngest performer ever to take a lead vocal at the adult Eurovision. "J'ai volé la vie" finished in eighth place of the 22 entrants. In response to reservations expressed by a number of participating countries regarding Pâque's youth (and that of 1989 Israeli singer Gili, who was only slightly older), the European Broadcasting Union amended the Eurovision rules on age with effect from 1990.

Pâque released several singles and two albums in Belgium during the 1990s, and in recent years has appeared in stage musicals such as Titanic and Singin' in the Rain in Belgium and France.

== Discography ==
=== Singles ===
- 1989: "J'ai volé la vie"
- 1989: "Ils reviennent"
- 1990: "Bébé bambou"
- 1991: "Danse"
- 1991: "Noël différent"
- 1992: "Kiss Me" (with Daniel Mendy)
- 1992: "Nous, c'est spécial"
- 1993: "Laisse-moi voyager"
- 1996: "C'est vrai...je t'aime"
- 1996: "Je garderai pour toi"
- 1998: "Mama, c'est l'heure"

=== Albums ===
- 1996: C'est vrai...je t'aime
- 1998: Chante-nous la vie

Preceded by Gérard Lenorman with Chanteur de charme	France in the Eurovision Song Contest; 1989	Succeeded by Joëlle Ursull with White and Black Blues
