= Cyprus in the Eurovision Song Contest 1989 =

- Eurovision Song Contest 1989
- Participating broadcaster: Cyprus Broadcasting Corporation (CyBC)
- Country: Cyprus
- Selection process: Internal selection
- Announcement date: Song: 6 February 1989; Artist: 27 March 1989

Competing entry
- Song: "Apopse as vrethoume"
- Artist: Fanny Polymeri and Yiannis Savvidakis
- Songwriters: Efi Meletiou; Marios Meletiou

Placement
- Final result: 11th, 51 points

Participation chronology

Cyprus was represented at the Eurovision Song Contest 1989 with the song "Apopse as vrethoume", composed by Marios Meletiou, with lyrics by Efi Meletiou, and performed by Fanny Polymeri and Yiannis Savvidakis. The Cypriot participating broadcaster, the Cyprus Broadcasting Corporation (CyBC), internally selected its entry.

== Before Eurovision ==
=== Internal selection ===
The Cyprus Broadcasting Corporation (CyBC) opened a submission period for Cypriot artists and composers to submit songs until 7 January 1989. By the end of the submission period, 56 submissions had been received, of which three were invalid.

The internal selection was held on 6 February 1989 in the CyBC buildings in Nicosia. The results were decided by a 14-member jury consisting of five CyBC employees and nine people in the music industry. The selection consisted of five stages and lasted over nine hours, from around 9:00 until 18:10 (EET). In the first stage, the submitted recordings of all 56 songs were presented, the invalid entries were removed from the competition, and each jury member chose their sixteen favourite songs, after which the votes were collected and the sixteen songs with the highest number of votes progressed to the second stage. In the second stage, the sixteen songs were presented again and then whittled down to eight songs, which were then whittled down to four and then two songs. The winner was chosen out of the final two songs, however the rules of the internal selection stated that it would not provide a runner-up song. The winner of the internal selection, "Apopse as vrethoume" written by Marios Meletiou and Efi Meletiou, was revealed in a news broadcast directly after the internal selection at 20:30 (EET).

=== Artist selection ===
Marios Meletiou had an agreement with the singer of the recording of "Apopse as vrethoume" that was submitted to the internal selection that they would remain anonymous. Thus, it is unknown who the original performer of "Apopse as vrethoume" was. Shortly after the internal selection, Marios Meletiou entered discussions with CyBC to find a suitable performer of "Apopse as vrethoume" for the Eurovision Song Contest 1989. The CyBC considered three main candidates: Konstantina Konstantinou, Andri Konstantinou, and Anna Vissi. Marios Meletiou favoured Anna Vissi as the performer of the song and sent a recording of "Apopse as vrethoume" to Anna Vissi for her to decide if she would want to perform it at the Eurovision Song Contest, however she responded in the negative. CyBC then sent a delegation to Athens (including Marios Meletiou) to make contacts with record labels and Greek artists, while also contacting Cypriot artists living in Cyprus, to find a suitable performer for "Apopse as vrethoume". During this time, it was decided to have the song performed by a duo or trio and Marios Meletiou proposed Fanny Polymeri and Yiannis Savvidakis as the performers of the song. On 27 March 1989, a committee at CyBC listened to recordings of several candidate artists and selected Fanny Polymeri and Yiannis Savvidakis as the singers of "Apopse as vrethoume".

== At Eurovision ==
On the night of the final Fanny Polymeri and Yiannis Savvidakis performed seventeenth in the running order, following Spain and preceding Switzerland. At the close of voting "Apopse as vrethoume" had received 51 points, placing Cyprus 11th out of 22 countries. The Cypriot jury awarded its 12 points to Greece.

=== Voting ===
Points awarded to Cyprus
Score	Country
12 points	Iceland
10 points	
8 points	Denmark
7 points	Greece
6 points	Portugal; United Kingdom
5 points	
4 points	Switzerland
3 points	Israel
2 points	Austria; Italy
1 point	Ireland

Points awarded by Cyprus
Score	Country
12 points	Greece
10 points	Austria
8 points	Sweden
7 points	France
6 points	Italy
5 points	Yugoslavia
4 points	Spain
3 points	Finland
2 points	United Kingdom
1 point	Germany
