= United Kingdom in the Eurovision Song Contest 1989 =

- Eurovision Song Contest 1989
- Participating broadcaster: British Broadcasting Corporation (BBC)
- Country: United Kingdom
- Selection process: A Song for Europe 1989
- Selection date: 24 March 1989

Competing entry
- Song: "Why Do I Always Get It Wrong"
- Artist: Live Report
- Songwriters: Brian Hodgson; John Beeby

Placement
- Final result: 2nd, 130 points

Participation chronology

The United Kingdom was represented at the Eurovision Song Contest 1989 with the song "Why Do I Always Get It Wrong", composed by John Beeby, with lyrics by Brian Hodgson, and performed by Live Report. The British participating broadcaster, the British Broadcasting Corporation (BBC), selected its entry through a national final.

== Before Eurovision ==
=== A Song for Europe 1989 ===
200 entrants were submitted to a panel of selectors to sing in the national final.

The BBC held the final on 24 March 1989 at Studio 6 of the BBC Television Centre in London, featuring eight songs and hosted by Terry Wogan on BBC1. A separate results show was broadcast on BBC1 the same evening. BBC Radio 2 simulcast the final and also broadcast the results show, both with commentary by Ken Bruce.

The eight songs in contention to represent the United Kingdom were premiered in various programmes on BBC Radio 2 between 20 and 23 March.

The BBC Concert Orchestra under the direction of Ronnie Hazlehurst as conductor accompanied all but the winning song, but despite performing live, the orchestra were off-screen, behind the set. Hazlehurst conducted two live keyboard players who accompanied the UK entry’s backing track at the Eurovision final in Lausanne.

For the second year running the BBC convened a panel to pass comment on each of the songs. The panel comprised Deke Arlon, Gary Davies, Leslie Bricusse, and former Eurovision winner Lulu.

There were 300,000 televotes cast in 90 minutes of telephone lines being open for voting.

A Song for Europe 1989 – 24 March 1989
R/O	Artist	Song	Songwriter(s)	Televotes	Place
1	Frankie Johnson	"Back in the Groove"	Bradley James, Stewart James	10,731	6
2	James Oliver	"Can't Stop Loving You"	James Oliver	9,110	7
3	Jane Alexander	"Shame"	Marwenna Haver, Peter Oxendale	47,664	3
4	Danny Ellis	"Just for the Good Times"	Les Reed, David Reilly	6,777	8
5	Julie C	"You Stepped Out of My Dreams"	Bill Jessop, Jason Havenhand	51,449	2
6	Live Report	"Why Do I Always Get It Wrong"	Brian Hodgson, John Beeby	111,996	1
7	The Pearls	"Love Come Down"	Joe Ortiz, Pauly Moore	33,279	4
8	Linda Carroll	"Heaven Help My Heart"	Clark Sorely	17,084	5

== At Eurovision ==
The 1989 contest was staged at the Palais de Beaulieu in Lausanne, Switzerland on 6 May. 22 countries participated, and the UK performed seventh on the night. Live Report took second place with 130 points, seven points behind the winners, Yugoslavia.

=== Voting ===
Points awarded to the United Kingdom
Score	Country
12 points	France; Germany; Luxembourg; Norway; Portugal
10 points	Spain; Sweden
8 points	Austria
7 points	Israel; Netherlands
6 points	Finland; Italy; Yugoslavia
5 points	
4 points	Ireland
3 points	
2 points	Cyprus; Greece
1 point	Denmark; Turkey

Points awarded by the United Kingdom
Score	Country
12 points	Yugoslavia
10 points	Denmark
8 points	Switzerland
7 points	Spain
6 points	Cyprus
5 points	Greece
4 points	Sweden
3 points	Netherlands
2 points	Israel
1 point	Germany
