= Germany in the Eurovision Song Contest 1989 =

- Eurovision Song Contest 1989
- Participating broadcaster: ARD (Note: Arbeitsgemeinschaft der öffentlich-rechtlichen Rundfunkanstalten der Bundesrepublik Deutschland) – Bayerischer Rundfunk (BR)
- Country: Germany
- Selection process: Ein Lied für Lausanne
- Selection date: 23 March 1989

Competing entry
- Song: "Flieger"
- Artist: Nino de Angelo
- Songwriters: Dieter Bohlen; Joachim Horn-Bernges

Placement
- Final result: 14th, 46 points

Participation chronology

Germany was represented at the Eurovision Song Contest 1989 with the song "Flieger", composed by Dieter Bohlen, with lyrics by Joachim Horn-Bernges, and performed by Nino de Angelo. The German participating broadcaster on behalf of ARD, Bayerischer Rundfunk (BR), selected their entry through a national final. This year marked the last contest in which participation and televoting were only open to residents of West Germany.

== Before Eurovision ==
=== Ein Lied für Lausanne ===
The national final, broadcast by Bayerischer Rundfunk (BR) to ARD broadcasters across West Germany, took place on 23 March 1989 at the Deutsches Theater in Munich, and was hosted by Hape Kerkeling. Ten acts presented their entries live and the winner was selected by public televoting.

Final – 23 March 1989
R/O	Artist	Song	Songwriter(s)	Votes	Place
1	Die Erben	"Bitte, nicht nochmal"	Alexander Bassler; Bernd Kusserow	1,799	7
2	Xanadu	"Einen Traum für diese Welt"	Tony Hendrik; Burkhard Lasch	10,891	2
3	Clou	"Heut' Nacht sind sie allein"	Jörg Sieber	1,156	9
4	Dorkas	"Ich hab' Angst"	Ralph Siegel; Bernd Meinunger	7,973	3
5	Francesco Napoli	"Viva l'amore"	Peter Columbus; Oliver Kels; Michael Krotus	1,659	8
6	ZouZou	"Ich such' dich"	Stephan Gade; ZouZou Eder	1,941	6
7	Andreas Martin	"Herz an Herz"	Andreas Martin; Joachim Horn-Bernges	3,855	4
8	Canan Braun	"Wunderland"	Glen Stone; Tanja Penniston; Ira Rödel	2,570	5
9	Nino de Angelo	"Flieger"	Dieter Bohlen; Joachim Horn-Bernges	14,625	1
10	Caren Faust	"Diese Zeit"	Thomas Gesell; Hanswilli Großmann; Bernd Reheuser	841	10

== At Eurovision ==
The contest was broadcast on Erstes Deutsches Fernsehen (with commentary by Thomas Gottschalk), SSVC Television, and on radio (with commentary by Ado Schlier). The show was watched by 9.87 million viewers in West Germany.

Nino de Angelo performed twenty-first on the night of the contest, following Iceland and preceding Yugoslavia. At the close of the voting the song had received 46 points, placing 14th in a field of 22 competing countries.

=== Voting ===
Points awarded to Germany
Score	Country
12 points	
10 points	
8 points	
7 points	Denmark; Italy
6 points	Sweden; Switzerland
5 points	Belgium; Portugal
4 points	
3 points	Greece; Iceland
2 points	Ireland
1 point	Cyprus; United Kingdom

Points awarded by Germany
Score	Country
12 points	United Kingdom
10 points	Spain
8 points	Sweden
7 points	Italy
6 points	Netherlands
5 points	Austria
4 points	Ireland
3 points	Israel
2 points	France
1 point	Yugoslavia
