= Turkey in the Eurovision Song Contest 1989 =

- Eurovision Song Contest 1989
- Participating broadcaster: Turkish Radio and Television Corporation (TRT)
- Country: Turkey
- Selection process: 13. Eurovision Şarkı Yarışması Türkiye Finali
- Selection date: 11 March 1989

Competing entry
- Song: "Bana Bana"
- Artist: Pan
- Songwriter: Timur Selçuk

Placement
- Final result: 21st, 5 points

Participation chronology

Turkey was represented at the Eurovision Song Contest 1989 with the song "Bana Bana", written by Timur Selçuk, and performed by Pan. The Turkish participating broadcaster, the Turkish Radio and Television Corporation (TRT), selected its entry through a national final.

== Before Eurovision ==
=== 13. Eurovision Şarkı Yarışması Türkiye Finali ===
The Turkish Radio and Television Corporation (TRT) held the national final on 11 March 1989 at the Ari TV studios in Ankara, hosted by Bülent Özveren and Güler Kazmacı. Sixteen songs competed and the winner was determined by the votes of eight regional juries.

Final – 11 March 1989
R/O	Artist	Song	Lyricist	Composer	Points	Place
1	Grup Denk	"Aşk-ı Memnu"	Bora Ebeoğlu	Turhan Yükseler	37	7
2	Kayahan and 3. Nesil	"Ve Melankoli"	Kayahan Açar		63	2
3	MFÖ	"Adı Naim"	Mazhar Alanson	MFÖ	3	15
4	Sertab Altın and Klips	"Hasret"	Aysel Gürel	Uğur Başar	57	3
5	Jale Bekar, Gür Akad and Seden Kutlubay	"Bir Fantastik Aşk"	Aysel Gürel	Garo Mafyan	18	11
6	Hazal Selçuk	"Bir Resimde Sen"	Timur Selçuk		57	3
7	Arzu Ece and Sibel Tüzün	"Elifin Aldı Beni"	Aysel Gürel	Selçuk Başar	22	10
8	Grup RC	"Hep Sıfır"	Cem Bezeyiş		49	5
9	Emel Müftüoğlu and Erdal Çelik	"Pardon"	Ayşe Irmak Manioğlu	Aslıgül Kırıcı	42	6
10	Fatih Erkoç	"Bir Sevgi Ver Bana"	Atilla Şentin		0	16
11	Grup Pan	"Bana Bana"	Timur Selçuk		71	1
12	Grup RC	"Çaresi Yok Sensizliğin"	Cem Bezeyiş		7	13
13	Neco	"Fora Fora"	Ali Kocatepe	Selmi Andak	18	11
14	Fatih Erkoç	"Bir Nostalji Bu"	Aysel Gürel	Garo Mafyan	32	8
15	Jeyan Erpi, Cihan Okan and Belma Sera	"Hayır"	Zeynep Talu	Melih Kibar	5	14
16	Fatih Erkoç	"Öyle Bakma"	Sezen Aksu	Onno Tunç	30	9

== At Eurovision ==
The contest was broadcast on TV1 (with commentary by Bülend Özveren). On the night of the contest Pan performed 5th in the running order following the Netherlands and preceding Belgium. At the close of the voting Bana Bana had received 5 points, placing Turkey 21st among 22. The Turkish jury awarded its 12 points to Yugoslavia.

=== Voting ===
Points awarded to Turkey
Score	Country
12 points	
10 points	
8 points	
7 points	
6 points	
5 points	
4 points	Yugoslavia
3 points	
2 points	
1 point	Spain

Points awarded by Turkey
Score	Country
12 points	Yugoslavia
10 points	Finland
8 points	Switzerland
7 points	Ireland
6 points	Denmark
5 points	Norway
4 points	Portugal
3 points	Austria
2 points	Spain
1 point	United Kingdom
