= Festival Omladina =

Music festival held in Subotica, Serbia

- Genre: Pop, rock
- Locations: Subotica, Serbia (Yugoslavia 1961–90)
- Years active: 1961–90; 2012–present
- Founders: Mladost Society for Culture and Arts
- Website: www.festivalomladina.com

Festival Omladina (English: Youth Festival), also known as Omladinski Festival, is a music festival held in Subotica, Serbia. The festival was founded in 1961 as a competition of young composers of popular music. Their compositions were initially performed by pop singers, but soon the performers of competing compositions became rock bands. In the 1970s, the non-competitive part, featuring established rock acts, was added to the program, and in the 1980s the festival became a competition of young rock bands. During the years, some of the most notable acts of the Yugoslav pop and rock scene performed on the festival.

In 1990, at the beginning of the breakup of Yugoslavia, the festival ceased to exist. In 2011 the festival anniversary was celebrated with a concert of famous acts who made their first steps on the festival, and in 2012 the festival was reestablished.

== 1961 ==
The festival was founded by the members of Mladost (Youth) Society for Culture and Arts, as a competition of young popular music composers. More than 120 compositions by composers from all parts of Yugoslavia were sent to the competition, 9 of which were chosen to be performed at the festival. The festival was held on 4 and 5 December at the Subotica National Theatre. The songs were performed by young singers who were members of Mladost society. The youngest of them was six-year-old Evika Stražarković. The singers were accompanied by Mladost Brass and String Pop Orchestra conducted by Josip Kovač. The festival was recorded by Radio Belgrade.

=== Performers ===
- Marika Matijević
- Franjo Niderholcer
- Katarina Dorožmai
- Dijana Jančikin
- Eva Stražarković
- Marija Vuković
- Ernest Zvekan
- Viktor Sabo
- Ilija Vorgučin
- Vladimir Štulić
- Gabor Gencel

=== Awards ===
- First Prize – "Daj mi osmeh" by Kornelije Kovač
- Second Prize – "Zvezde sreće" by Sylvester Levay
- Third Prize – "Leto je prošlo" by Živko Janjić and Vlado Ljubičić
- Audience's Choice Award – "Macko" by Lajoš Kurai
- Best Lyrics Award – "Traganje u kiši" by Vojin Dolinka
- Youngest Performer Award – Eva Stražarković (six years old)

== 1962 ==
Around 120 songs were submitted for competition with 10 of them chosen to be performed at the festival. They were performed by budding singers. The festival was held on 17 and 18 November in Subotica National Theatre. The jury featured Radio Television Belgrade journalists Žika Dimitrijević, Stevan Markićević, and Aleksandar Korać, Mladost magazine journalist Gordana Jakovljević and Subotica city representatives Pavle Bačić and Josip Kovač. Each song was performed in two versions, by two different singers.

=== Competition ===
Composition	Composer	Lyricist	First performer	Second performer
"Vedri nokturno"	Marija Radić	Tona Andin	Katarina Dorožmai	Marija Vuković
"Samo iluzije"	Ferid Mujković	Ivan Perčić	Marija Vuković	Balaž Aranjoš and choir
"Sumrak"	Sylvester Levay	Branko Temunović	Marika Matijević and choir	Naum Brzanov
"Susret"	Kornelije Kovač	Bogdan Stojadinović	Eva Berleković	Svetozar Litavski
"Priča barke"	Kornelije Kovač	Bogdan Stojadinović	Teri Kovač and choir	Stevan Nađ
"Poljubac kraj reke"	Anton Zupanc	Anton Zupanc	Katarina Dorožmai	Duet Stevanov
"Sve devojke"	Anton Zupanc	Anton Zupanc	Margita Pastor	Svetozar Litavski
"Maturant"	Sylvester Levay	Branko Temunović	Margita Pastor	Marika Matijević
"Mala kafana"	Sylvester Levay	Branko Temunović	Marika Matijević	Franjo Niderholcer
"Vizija"	Gojko Novaković	Gojko Novaković	Teri Kovač	Imre Juhas

=== Awards ===
- First Prize – "Susret" by Kornelije Kovač
- Second Prize – "Vizija" by Gojko Novaković
- Third Prize – "Sumrak" by Sylvester Levay
- Audience's Choice Award – "Sumrak" by Sylvester Levay
- Best Lyrics Award – "Susret" by Bogdan Stojadinović
- Youngest Composer Award – Sylvester Levay
- Most Rhythmic Composition Award – "Poljubac kraj reke" by Anton Zupanc

== 1963 ==
The festival was held during 13, 14 and 15 September in Subotica National Theatre. 224 compositions were sent to the contest, 16 of which were performed on the festival. The performers were accompanied by Mladost orchestra. Once again, every song was performed in two different versions.

=== Competition ===
Composition	Composer	Lyricist	Arranger	First performer	Second performer
"Radoznali sunčev zrak"	Lajoš Kurai	Lajoš Kurai	Stevan Radosavljević	Margita Kovač	Margita Pastor
"Nova ljubav"	Vladislav Kanić	Vladislav Kanić	Ilija Genić / Milan Kostić	Vladislav Kanić	Biljana Pilić
"Opet sam sam"	Svetozar Radić	Svetozar Radić	Josip Kovač / Stevan Radosavljević	Margita Pastor	Stevan Zarić
"Proleće ljubavi"	Srećko Zubak	Arpaš sisters	Jožef Arpaš / Predrag Stevanović	Duo Arpaš	Duo Stevanov
"Čežnja"	Jovan Adamov	Živko Popadić	Jožef Gubicak / Josip Kovač	Balaž Aranjoš	Teri Kovač
"Dođi"	Margareta Gobor	Margareta Gobor	Ilija Genić / Josip Kovač	Slavko Lalić	Mirjana Stilinović
"Kandidat"	Roman Butina	Blanka Hudoba	Ilija Genić / Milan Kotlić	Duo M	Duo Radosavljević
"Zapisano u vetrovima"	Vera Radman and Veljko Vujčić	Branko Kucinić	Stevan Radosavljević	Ratko Bošković	Nevenka Ivošević
"Osvajač"	Roman Butina	Blanka Hudoba	Josip Kovač / Milan Kotlić	Nada Radojević	Duo Stevanov
"Jesen"	Zvonko Čulina	Zvonko Čulina	Stevan Radosavljević / Josip Kovač	Teri Kovač	Svetozar Litavski
"Medison, Medison"	Srećko Zubak	Blanka Hudoba	Stevan Radosavljević	Margita Kovač	Katarina Dorožmai
"Kao varka"	Lajoš Kurai	Ivan Jovanović	Stevan Radosavljević	Stevan Zarić	Ratko Bošković
"Nakon studija"	Roman Butina	Blanka Hudoba	Ilija Genić / Milan Kotlić	Biljana Pilić	Vera Radojević
"Vrbe"	Zdenko Runjić	Zdenko Runjić	Josip Kovač / Jožef Gubičak	Ernest Zvekan	Svetozar Litavski
"Bez oproštaja"	Zoran Rambosek	Vuk Stambolović	Ilija Genić / Alojz Skeri	Zoran Rambosek	Vuk Stambolović
"Oči boje lešnika"	Kornelije Kovač	Kornelije Kovač	Stevan Radosavljević / Josip Kovač	Mirjana Stilinović	Stevan Zarić

=== Awards ===
- First Prize – "Zapisano u vetrovima" by Vera Radman and Veljko Vujčić
- Second Prize – "Dođi" by Margareta Gobor
- Third Prize – "Oči boje lešnika" by Kornelije Kovač
- Audience's Choice Award – "Vrbe" by Zdenko Runjić
- Best Lyrics Award – "Radoznali sunčev zrak" by Lajoš Kurai
- Youngest Composer Award – Svetozar Radić
- Most Cheerful Melody Award – "Nova ljubav" by Vladislav Kanić

== 1964 ==
The fourth edition of the festival was held from 14 to 16 May, in National Theatre. It was the first edition of the festival to be held in May, which would become a tradition in the following years. Eighteen songs were performed at the festival, once again in two different versions. The performers included some of the future stars of the Yugoslav pop scene, like Bisera Veletanlić, Zafir Hadžimanov and Zoran Rambosek.

=== Competition ===
Composition	First performer	Second performer
"Plave kovrdže"	Silvija Franc	Stevan Zarić
"Ti si opet tu"	Silvija Franc	Stevan Zarić
"Mister Morse"	Jarmila Cikotska	Stevan Zarić
"Hol a szerelem?"	Emilija Sabo	Jarmila Cikotska
"Ona voli samo tvist"	Zoran Rambosek	Zafir Hadžimanov
"Prvi školski dan"	Elvina Štelc	Ivanka Pavlović
"Izgubljeni put"	Mirjana Beširević	Bisera Veletanlić
"Voli me"	Zafir Hadžimanov	Zoran Rambosek
"Pevaj pesmu"	Vladislav Kanić	Bisera Veletanlić
"Naš put"	Antika Stipić	Biljana Pilić
"Tiha Luna"	Ervina Štelcl	Jurica Pavuković
"Znam"	Biserka Spevec	Gordana Dimitrijević
"Mari"	Jurica Pavuković	Marjan Mumelaš
"Školsko zvono, mi i tvist"	Ivanka Pavlović	Katarina Dorožmai
"Mislim o tebi"	Gordana Dimitrijević	Mirjana Beširević
"Sećanje na susret"	Katica Bidleg	Biserka Spevec
"Ja danas neću doći"	Marjan Mumelaš	Biljana Pilić

=== Awards ===
- First Prize – "Sećanje na susret" by Vera Radman
- Second Prize – "Mister Morse" by Brana Honjec
- Third Prize – "Školsko zvono, mi i tvist" by Laslo Balaž
- Audience's Choice Award – "Sećanje na susret" by Vera Radman
- Youngest Composer Award – Laslo Balaž
- Best Interpretation Award – Biserka Spevec
- Best Composition about Life of the Youth Award – "Znam" by Jovan Adamov

== 1965 ==
The fifth edition of the festival was held in Subotica National Theatre. Besides the Mladost society and Mladost magazine, the Society of Jazz and Pop Musicians and Ritam magazine also took part in the organization. The jury featured composers Bojan Adamič, Vojislav Simić and Aleksandar Korać and poet Miroslav Antić.

=== Competition ===
Composition	Composer	Lyricist	First performer	Second performer
"Cvetić"	Lajoš Kurai	Stevan Pupovac	Blaga Petreska	Mahir Paloš
"Kraj Tise, sam"	Tibor Balaš	Tibor Balaš	Tibor Balaš	Mirjana Beširević
"Prvi randevu"	Tibor Balaš	Tibor Balaš	Tibor Balaš	Katarina Dorožmai
"Žalim"	Jovan Adamov	Tibor Balaš	Biserka Spevec	Silvija Franc
"Nedovršene Misli"	Jovan Adamov	Tibor Balaš	Antika Stipić	Vladislav Kanić
"Sreli smo se"	Jovan Adamov	Tibor Balaš	Marjan Mumelaš	Katica Bidleg
"Uspomena još o tebi priča"	Jovan Adamov	Tibor Balaš	Mirjana Beširević	Jurica Pavuković
"Divno je to"	Laslo Špang	Laslo Špang	Bisera Veletanlić	Vesna Ugar
"Priča o izletu"	Laslo Špang	Laslo Špang	Jelica Kukić	Blaga Petreska
"Miris lipe"	Stojan Nenadović	Stojan Nenadović	Mahir Paloš	Antika Stipić
"Oči neba"	Marko Tipurić	Marko Tipurić	Tamara Šarić	Ivanka Pavlović
"Proljeće"	Emil Glavnik	Ljubo Slavko	Jurica Pavuković	Marjan Mumelaš
"Možda te volim"	Želimir Kalanj	Želimir Kalanj	Ivanka Pavlović	Katarina Dorožmai
"Šetajući s tobom"	Vladislav Kanić	Vladislav Kanić	Tamara Šarić	Albertina Trbojević
"Semiramida"	Zdenko Runjić	Marija Mandić	Vinko Ivanović	Stevan Zarić
"Ja samo tebe volim"	Želimir Damić	Želimir Damić	Albertina Trbojević	Jelica Kukić
"Posle tvog odlaska"	Stevan Zarić	Stevan Zarić	Stevan Zarić	Silvija Franc
"Čas koji čekam"	Svetozar Radić	Svetozar Radić	Vesna Ungar	Bisera Veletanlić
"Kiša je počela"	Miroslav Veličković	Miroslav Veličković	Vladislav Kanić	Vinko Ivanović
"Naš dan"	Zvonko Čulina	Zvonko Čulina	Katica Bidleg	Biserka Spevec

=== Awards ===
- First Prize – "Naš dan" by Zvonko Čulina
- Second Prize – "Nedovršene misli" by Jovan Adamov
- Third Prize – "Oči neba" by Marko Tipurić
- Audience's Choice Award – "Šetajući s tobom" by Vladimir Kanić
- Best Lyrics Award – "Šetajući s tobom" by Vladimir Kanić
- Most Cheerlful Composition Award – "Šetajući s tobom" by Vladimir Kanić
- Youngest Composer Award – Tibor Balaš
- Best Interpretation Award – Biserka Spevec
- Youngest Performer Award – Tamara Šarić

== 1966 ==
The sixth edition festival, held in Subotica National Theatre, featured 18 compositions performed by 21 artists. Once again, each song was performed in two versions, by two different singers.

The festival featured the very first public appearance by 17-year-old Kemal Monteno who would later go on to become one of Yugoslavia's most notable singer-songwriters.

=== Competition ===
Composition	Composer	Lyricist	First performer	Second performer
"Otkud tebe znam"	Tibor Balaš	Tibor Balaš	Mića Novaković	Vladislav Kanić
"Dan koji pamtim"	Tibor Balaš	Tibor Balaš	Vladislav Kanić	Ivana Nikolić
"Izbeledeli san"	Tibor Balaš	Tibor Balaš	Radoslav Rukavina	Katica Bidleg
"Želim da znaš"	Petar Bahun	Petar Bahun	Stevan Zarić	Kemal Monteno
"Taj grad"	Jovan Adamov	Stevan Zarić	Ivana Nikolić	Stevan Zarić
"Daleko od tebe"	Jovan Adamov	Albertina Trbojević	Marjan Mumelaš	Katica Bidleg
"Ne budi tužna"	Laslo Špang	Laslo Špang	Vjekoslav Jut	Igor Jakac
"Serenada"	Laslo Špang	Laslo Špang	Kemal Monteno	Radoslav Rukavina
"Pred odlazak tvoj"	Laslo Špang	Laslo Špang	Aranjoš Balaž	Vjekoslav Jut
"Oči neba"	Marko Tipurić	Marko Tipurić	Tamara Šarić	Ivanka Pavlović
"Ti sanjaš večeras"	Vladislav Kanić	Vinko Ivanović and Vladislav Kanić	Vinko Ivanović	Marija Beširević
"Čuj me, devojko"	Vladislav Kanić	Vladislav Kanić	Mihajlo Dimitrijević	Dragan Jović
"Moje obećanje"	Vladislav Kanić	Vladislav Kanić	Mirjana Beširević	Marjan Mumelaš
"Odrasla si"	Jerko Rošin	Vanja Kraljević	Igor Jakac	Milan Mutavdžić
"Ti si deo mene"	Kornelije Kovač	Zdravko Ostojić	Biserka Spevec	Mihailo Kovač
"Sjena na plaži"	Zdenko Runjić	Vinko Ivanović	Dragan Jović	Vinko Ivanović
"More i ti"	Svetlana Ivanović	Vinko Ivanović	Katarina Dorožmai	Zlatko Golubović
"Ti i tvoje oči"	Slave Dimitrov	Vinko Ivanović	Mirjana Beširević	Biserka Spevec
"Srećna ljubav"	Mihajlo Apostolovski	Mihajlo Apostolovski and A. Stošić	Zlatko Golubović	Mihailo Dimitrijević

=== Awards ===
- First Prize – "Želim da znam" by Petar Bahun
- Second Prize – "Odrasla si" by Jerko Rošin
- Third Prize – "Ti i tvoje oči" by Slave Dimitrov
- Audience's Choice Award – "Odrasla si" by Jerko Rošin
- Best Lyrics Award – "Odrasla si" by Vanja Kraljević
- Most Cheerful Composition Award – "Serenada" by Laslo Špang
- Youngest Composer Award – Svetlana Ivanović (fifteen years old)
- Best Interpretation Award – Mirjana Beširević and Milan Mutavdžić
- Youngest Performer Award – Kemal Monteno and Radoslav Rukavina

== 1967 ==
The seventh edition of the festival, held in Subotica National Theater, was the first one to be broadcast by television. Twenty songs were performed at the festival, each by two different singers.

=== Competition ===
Composition	Composer	Lyricist	First performer	Second performer
"Ti moraš znati"	Georgi Dimitrovski	Kornelije Kovač	Zoran Milivojević	Blaga Petreska
"Veterot, ti i jas"	Georgi Dimitrovski	Slobodanka Karać	Blaga Petreska	Mihajlo Dimitrijević
"Sanjarenje"	Vojkan Borisavljević	Ivan Nandor	Diego Varagić	Miodrag Popov
"Ljubav na plaži"	Vojkan Borisavljević	Vojkan Borisavljević	Milica Štrbac	Selma Koluder
"Kaži mi"	Slave Dimitrov	Slave Dimitrov	Slave Dimitrov	Stojan Zerzevski
"Neću takvu ljubav"	Mihajlo Kovač	Mihajlo Kovač	Mihajlo Kovač	Seka Kojadinović
"Poklonjeni cvet"	Tomislav Pavlović	Tomislav Pavlović	Marija Babić	Kemal Monteno
"Bili smo tako mladi"	Marko Tipurić	Ivica Lepak and Marko Tipurić	Marija Maravić	Zoran Milivojević
"Svi moji prijatelji"	Jerko Rošin	Jerko Rošin	Vjekoslav Jut	Milan Mutavdžić
"Lepo je život"	Jerko Rošin	Jerko Rošin	Seka Kojadinović and Koja Kojadinović	Rebus Quartet
"Sunčana"	Ifeta Olujić	Ifeta Olujić	Mihajlo Dimitrijević	Diego Varagić
"Te ljubam ko nebo"	Simeon Gerasimov	Đoko Georgijev	Slave Dimitrov	Stojan Zerzevski
"Ljubav u troje"	Stevan Burka	Nada Stojanov	Milica Štrbac	Selma Koluder
"Druga ljubav"	Janko Solak	Janko Solak	Mihajlo Kovač	Miodrag Popov
"Bila sam daleko"	Lajoš Pongo	Tibor Balaš	Ivica Martinčević	Kemal Monteno
"Još pamtim"	Lajoš Pongo	Tibor Balaš	Milan Mutavdžić	Katica Bidleg
"Stani za čas"	Tibor Balaš	Tibor Balaš	Ljiljana Petrović	Vjekoslav Jut
"Dok sam bila sa drugim"	Tibor Balaš	Tibor Balaš	Marija Babić	Katica Bidleg
"Sunčan dan, kišni dan"	Tibor Balaš	Tibor Balaš	Ivica Martinčević	Rebus Quartet
"Tri dana"	Tibor Balaš	Tibor Balaš	Ljiljana Petrović	Marija Maravić

=== Awards ===
- First Prize – "Neću takvu ljubav" by Mihajlo Kovač
- Second Prize – "Ljubav na plaži" by Vojkan Borisavljević
- Third Prize – "Stani na čas" by Tibor Balaš
- Audience's Choice Award – "Bio sam daleko" by Lajoš Pongo
- Best Lyrics Award – "Svi moji prijatelji" by Jerko Rošin
- Most Cheerful Composition Award – "Stani na čas" by Tibor Balaš
- Most Modern Composition Award – "Ljubav na plaži" by Vojkan Borisavljević
- Youngest Composer Award – Ifeta Olujić (nineteen years old)
- Best Interpretation Award – Blaga Petreska and Mihajlo Dimitrijević
- Youngest Performer Award – Ljiljana Petrović (thirteen years old)

== 1968 ==
In the eighth edition of the festival, held at the Subotica National Theatre, 20 songs were performed, each by two different performers. It was the last edition organized by Mladost Society for Culture and Arts.

This was the first edition of the festival to include rock bands as performers, with the bands Džentlmeni and Zlatni Akordi performing songs by competing composers. The band Zlatni Akordi featured the then unknown singer Josipa Lisac, which was her only appearance at the festival.

=== Competition ===
Composition	Composer	First performer	Second performer
"Lutanje"	Dražen Zimonjić	Karlo Klemenčić	Mladen Biočina
"Kad je spavao grad"	Ifeta Olujić	Dragan Jović	Stojan Zerzevski
"Daj mi vremena"	Mihajlo Kovač	Mihajlo Kovač	Žarko Dančuo
"Više ne postojiš"	Tibor Balaš	Katja Markotić	Kemal Monteno
"Veseli svet"	Đorđe Uzelac	Džentlmeni	Zoran Vidović
"Eja shpirti im"	Selma Balata	Selma Balata	Jasmina Baralić
"Moja ulica"	Boža Knežević	Dragan Komadinić	Boža Knežević
"Drugu ljubiš"	Slave Dimitrov	Slave Dimitrov	Zlatni Akordi
"San"	Nenad Đukić	Daliborka Stojšić	Branka Kovačević
"Ponekad"	Lajoš Pongo	Neda Ukraden	Tatjana Gros
"Balada"	Dražen Zimonjić	Dragan Komadinić	Kemal Monteno
"Ako želiš kraj"	Slave Dimitrov	Dragan Jović	Neda Ukraden
"Úgy várlak, kedvesem"	Nikola Jager	Julija Bisak	Tatjana Gros
"Radujmo se"	Stjepan Martinović	Karlo Klemenčić	Žarko Dančuo
"Sunce sja za nas"	Frano Parac	Akordi	Daliborka Stojšić and Stjepan Martinović
"Vrati se"	Jovan Krakovski	Stojan Zerzevski	Katja Markotić
"Varaš se"	Tibor Balaš	Branka Kovačević	Slave Dimitrov
"Naša mladost"	Dragan Jelić	Zoran Vidović	Džentlmeni
"A sad odlazi"	Novak Tešić	Jasmina Baralić	Mihajlo Kovač
"Četrnaest mi godina nije"	Slobodan Stupar	Stjepan Martinović	Mladen Biočina

=== Awards ===
- First Prize – "Drugu ljubiš" by Slave Dimitrov
- Second Prize – "Sunce sja za nas" by Frano Parac
- Third Prize – "Ponekad" by Lajoš Pongo
- Audience's Choice Award – "Balada" by Dražen Zimonjić
- Most Modern Composition Award – "Drugu ljubiš" by Slave Dimitrov
- Youngest Composer Award – Slobodan Stupar (seventeen years old)
- Best Interpretation Award – Žarko Dančuo and Tatjana Gros

== 1969 ==
The ninth edition of the festival was the first one to be organized by Subotica Culture Center and Radio Belgrade. It was also the first edition of the festival which was not held in Subotica National Theatre, but in Subotica Sports Hall, from 2 to 4 May. The jury consisted of former contestants, Kornelije Kovač, Lajoš Kurai, Jovan Adamov and Vojkan Borisavljević, and poet Petar Pajić. Until this edition of the festival, only the composers came from all parts of the country, while the performers were predominately the members of Mladost society; the ninth edition gave musicians from all parts of Yugoslavia the opportunity to perform, so the performers included established acts like Ibrica Jusić, Ivica Percl, Indexi, Delfini, Džentlmeni, Bele Vrane and others. From this edition of the festival the songs were performed in one version only.

=== Competition ===
Composition	Composer	Lyricist	Arranger	Performer
"Nisam taj"	Elizabeta Berčev	Elizabeta Berčev	Jovan Adamov	Marinko Rudić
"Nikad neću biti sretan"	Darji Billege	Josip Kokot	Alfons Vučer	Boris Babarović
"Pleši, pleši, momo mila"	Marko Demichell	Marko Demichell	Ante Cetinić	Delfini
"Ljiljana"	Slave Dimitrov	Slave Dimitrov	Slave Dimitrov	Slave Dimitrov
"Možda čudne stvari"	Nebojša Ignjatović	Robert Nemeček	Radan Bosner	Ibrica Jusić
"Sećanje na san"	Nebojša Ignjatović	Robert Nemeček	Vojkan Borisavljević	Dušan Prelević
"Vreme će zbrisati uspomene stare"	Aleksandar Ilić	Stjepo Martinović	Vojkan Borisavljević	Snežana Petčev
"U lud tonem sam"	Dragan Jelić	Stjepo Martinović	Vojkan Borisavljević	Džentlmeni
"Da li znaš"	Petko Katrandžijev	Petko Katrandžijev	Kornelije Kovač	Žarko Dančuo
"Mjesto pod suncem"	Petko Katrandžijev	Maja Perfiljeva	Kornelije Kovač	Indexi
"Ona koju želim"	Boža Knežević	Boža Knežević	Slave Dimitrov	Boža Knežević
"Prolaze godine"	Ferenc Kovač	Jovica Živković	Kornelije Kovač	Dalibor Brun
"Mini Moris"	Mihajlo Kovač	Mihajlo Kovač	Igor Savin	Sabina Varešanović
"Kasno je već"	Mihajlo Kovač	Ratko Kraljić	Kornelije Kovač	Vjekoslav Jut
"Kako site mladi"	Trajče Organdžijev	Trajče Organdžijev	Đorđe Novković	Seka Kojadinović
"Sve sam pokušala da te zavolim"	Frano Parać	Frano Parać	Frano Parać	Marcela Munger
"Postoji jedno mesto na svetu"	Tamara Pavlović and Nenad Pavlović	Stjepo Martinović	Vojkan Borisavljević	Tamara Pavlović
"Svaki dan sam"	Ivica Percl	Ivica Percl	Vojkan Borisavljević	Ivica Percl
"A sad odlazi"	Zoran Simjanović	Zoran Simjanović	Zoran Simjanović	Lidija Kodrič
"Kad bi htjela"	Goran Škerlep	Goran Škerlep	Dragica Kozlica	Goran Škerlep
"Vreme u nama"	Novak Tešić and Radenka Tešić	Novak Tešić	Slave Dimitrov	Vera Jankova
"Jesen na njenom dlanu"	Đorđe Uzelac	Stjepo Martinović	Jure Robežnik	Bele Vrane
"Picigin"	Nenad Vilović	Nenad Vilović	Kornelije Kovač	Dinamiti
"Zvezdani bulevar"	Dražen Zimonjić	Dražen Zimonjić	Vojkan Borisavljević	Daliborka Stojšić

=== Awards ===
- First Prize – "Jesen na njenom dlanu" by Đorđe Uzelac
- Second Prize – "Ljiljana" by Slave Dimitrov
- Third Prize – "Pleši, pleši, momo mila" by Marko Demichelli
- Audience's Choice First Prize – "Prolaze godine" by Ferenc Kovač
- Audience's Choice Second Prize – "Svaki dan sam" by Ivica Percl
- Audience's Choice Third Prize – "Nikad neću biti sam" by Darko Billege
- Best Lyrics Award – "Ona koju želim" by Božo Knežević
- Best Interpretation Award – Dalibor Brun
- Youngest Composer Award – Elizabeta Berčev (seventeen years old)

== 1970 ==
As a part of the tenth anniversary celebration, the festival included a non-competitive part featuring performances by well known and less known rock acts. It was the first edition of the festival to feature a non-competitive program.

The Third Prize was awarded to Miodrag Cokić's composition "Kažu". On the final evening, during which the awarded compositions were performed once again, the performer of "Kažu", Dušan Prelević, went on the stage intoxicated. Because of this scandal he was banned from Radio Television Belgrade programs for a year.

=== Competition ===
Composition	Composer	Lyricist	Performer
"Eden poraz ne e kraj"	Slave Dimitrov	M. Ilieva	Saša Petkovska
"Padao je sneg"	Gabor Lenđel	Ruža Rudić	Mihajlo Kovač
"Naši dani, Valerija"	Stjepo Martinović	Stjepo Martinović	Stjepo Martinović
"U predvečerje"	Slobodan Samardžić	Slobodan Samardžić	Slobodan Samardžić
"Starac iz moje ulice"	Slobodan Samardžić	Slobodan Samardžić	Jasmina Baralić
"Nada"	Z. Tepeš and R. Pintarić	Z. Tepeš and R. Pintarić	Duo Pintarić – Tepeš
"Kažu"	Miodrag Conić	Dragan Nadimović	Dušan Prelević
"Jednog dana jedno sunce"	Džemal Salković	Džemal Salković	Džemal Salković
"Ne reci nikome tajnu"	Džemal Salković	Džemal Salković	Tamara Pavlović
"Mala moja devojčice"	Radomir Dabić	Radomir Dabić	Džentlmeni
"Sakrij bol"	Suzana Saulić	Suzana Saulić	Sabina Varešanović
"Ljubav ti više nije važna"	Neven Mijat	Neven Mijat	Mi
"Sve što želim"	Petar Kantradžijev	T. Slinka	Zdenko Juraj
"Din, Don, Dan"	Vojko Sabolović	Vojko Sabolović	Vojko Sabolović
"Šta je dobro, šta je zlo"	Vojko Sabolović	Dubravka Dimić	Dubravka Dimić
"Kad su zvijezde padale"	Rajmond Rujić	T. Slinka	Mladi Levi
"Trenutak sreće"	Rajmond Rujić	I. Glišić	Dalibor Brun
"Slike iz mog kraja"	Krunoslav Slabinac	Krunoslav Slabinac	Ladislav Ledel
"Jedne noći u decembru"	Kemal Monteno	Kemal Monteno	Kemal Monteno
"Ja odlazim sutra"	Slobodan Kovačević and Ranko Rihtman	Nikola Borota	Indexi
"Jučer si otišla"	Fadil Redžić	B. Falatal	Indexi
"Sećanje na 14. april 19..."	Đorđe Uzelac	Božo Knežević	Seka Kojadinović
"Svjetlost"	Nebojša Ignjatović	Nebojša Ignjatović	Boris Babarović
"U kišni dan"	Krunoslav Slabinac	Krunoslav Slabinac	Krunoslav Slabinac

=== Awards ===
- First Prize – "U predvečerju" by Slobodan Samardžić
- Second Prize – "Ljubav ti više nije važna" by Neven Mijat
- Third Prize – "Kažu" by Miodrag Cokić
- Audience's Choice First Prize – "Padao je sneg" by Gabor Lenđel
- Audience's Choice Second Prize – "Jedne noći u decembru" by Kemal Monteno
- Audience's Choice Third Prize – "Naši dani, Valerija" by Stjepo Martinović
- Best Lyrics Award – "Kažu" by Dragan Nedimović
- Best Debutant – Saša Petkovska
- Youngest Composer Award – Suzana Saulić
- Youngest Performer Award – Ladislav Mezel

=== Non-competitive program ===
- Korni Grupa
- Indexi
- Mladi Levi
- Entuzijasti

== 1971 ==
In 1971, the festival was held in June. Twenty-two compositions were performed at the festival.

=== Awards ===
- First Prize – "Nikad mi nije dosta da te gledam" by Husein Kazas; performed by Husein Kazas
- Second Prize – "Ovce, ovce" by Nikola Borota; performed by Kamen Na Kamen
- Third Prize – "Teuta, ljubavi moja" by Tomor Beriša; performed by Ljuba Ninković
- Audience's Choice First Prize – "Ti si" by Stevan Burka; performed by Daniela Pančetović
- Audience's Choice Second Prize – "Otišla je" by Branko Grga; performed by Mija Muratović
- Audience's Choice Third Prize – "Jutri bo vse dobro" by Tomaž Domicelj; performed by Tomaž Domicelj
- Best Lyrics Award – Snežana Lipovska
- Best Interpretation Award – Oto Presner

== 1972 ==
In 1972, the festival started on Youth Day (25 May), with a midnight concert. This was the first edition of the festival to feature, besides musical program, art exhibitions and poetry evenings.

The band Lutajuća Srca, who won the First Prize, Audience's Choice First Prize and the Best Lyrics Award, were unable to perform on the final evening, so, on their recommendation, at the time little known singer-songwriter Nenad Milosavljević performed instead of them. The song "Mom bratu" was performed by sixteen year old Vesna Čipčić, who would several years later start a successful acting career.

=== Competition ===
Composition	Composer	Lyricist	Arranger	Performer
"Još ću noćas čekati"	Đurađ Mitraković	Stanko Pivašević	Nikica Kalođera	Nuki Šundić
"Noć naše ljubavi"	Ištvan Boroš	Ištvan Boroš	Stevan Radosavljević	Marija Babić
"Srećna deca smo bili"	Tomor Beriša	Duško Barak	Anti Soss	Milica Milisavljević
"I ako si mala"	Kemal Mandžuka	Kemal Mandžuka	Stipica Kalođera	Zoran Pavković
"Itd"	Ante Parat	Ante Parat	Ozren Depolo	Ante Parat
"Još malo"	Miroljub Jovanović and Milan Marković	Miroljub Jovanović and Milan Marković	Jure Robežnik	Lutajuća Srca
"Što da ti pružim"	Vladimir Delač	Marijan Kašaj	Igor Savin	Grešnici
"Pastirica"	Jovica Škaro	Jovica Škaro	Bojan Adamič	Jovica Škaro
"Mom bratu"	Jovica Škaro	Jovica Škaro	Ilija Genić	Vesna Čipčić
"Kako da te ostavim"	Đuroslava Bakić	Đuroslava Bakić	Zvonimir Skerl	Marjan Dugec
"Baš me briga"	Gabor Lenđel	Dragan Nedimović	Dečo Žgur	Anelidi
"Samo ljubi"	Ištvan Boroš	Ištvan Boroš	Vojkan Borisavljević	Maja Odžaklievska
"Tvoja igra"	Svetozar Nećak	Amalija Petrović	Aleksandar Nećak	Marija Kovač
"Serenada"	Husein Kazas	Orhan Dišo	Vojislav Simić	Vančo Tarabunov
"Spomen moj dalečen"	Todor Bojadžijev	Blagoje Stefanovski	Mihajlo Živanović	Vele Matevski
"Svaka reka"	Ferenc Kovač	Geza Varka	Stjepan Mihaljinec	Ladislav Mezel
"Budan ne mogu te naći"	Ljubiša Lolić	Ljubiša Lolić	Radan Bosner	Ljubiša Lolić
"Kristina"	Vančo Tarabunov	Vančo Tarabunov	Franjo Jenč	Rodoljub Vulović
"Raspevana gitara"	Stevo Prodanović	Stevo Prodanović	Ivan Kelemen	Mija Muratović
"Kaži mi"	Miodrag Božinovski	Miodrag Božinovski	Dragan Đakonovski	Miroljub Marković
"Mrtev in bel"	Tomaž Domicelj	Tomaž Domicelj	Tomaž Habe	Tomaž Domicelj
"Zbog tebe"	Nenad Vilović	Nenad Vilović	Julio Marić	Divna Berić

=== Awards ===
- First Prize – "Još malo" by Miroljub Jovanović and Milan Marković
- Second Prize – "Pastirica" by Jovica Škaro
- Third Prize – "Samo ljubi" by Ištvan Boroš
- Audience's Choice First Prize – "Još malo" by Miroljub Jovanović and Milan Marković
- Audience's Choice Second Prize – "Raspevana gitara" by Stevo Prodanović
- Audience's Choice Third Prize – "Pastirica" by Jovica Škoro
- Best Lyrics Award – "Mrtev in bel" by Tomaž Domicelj and "Još malo" by Miroljub Jovanović and Milan Marković
- Best Interpretation Award – Vele Matevski
- Youngest Composer Award – Svetozar Nećak (seventeen years old)
- Youngest Performer Award – Ladislav Mezel

== 1973 ==
522 compositions were sent to the contest, more than to any of the previous editions. The performers were accompanied by Radio Television Belgrade Big Band, conducted by Bojan Adamič.

=== Competition ===
Composition	Composer	Lyricist	Arranger	Performer
"Kate ljubavi"	Jovica Škaro	Jovica Škaro	Ilija Škaro	Jovica Škaro
"Tri ženske"	Marko Brecelj	Marko Brecelj	Bojan Adamič	Krik
"Ne reci da je kraj"	Ladislav Mezel	Ferenc Salma	Mihajlo Živanović	Zoran Milivojević
"Kanga e hestrum"	Lorenc Vučaj	Enver Derčeki	Vojislav Simić	Luan Hajra
"Tražim"	Srđan Marjanović	Srđan Marjanović	Miljenko Prohaska	Srđan Marjanović
"Pred kraj neba"	Nenad Pavlović	Dušan Govedarica	Vojislav Simić	Tamara Pavlović and Nenad Pavlović
"Mama, daj mi denar"	Tomaž Domicelj	Tomaž Domicelj	Dečo Žgur	Srce
"Ne plaši se, draga moja"	Gazmend Palaska	Gazmend Palaska	Vojkan Borisavljević	Gazmend Palaska
"Mom bratu"	Jovica Škaro	Jovica Škaro	Ilija Genić	Jovica Škaro
"Ti ne znaš gdje živi on"	Vlado Miloš	Vlado Miloš	Ismet Arnautalić	Jadranka Stojaković
"Svena edna roza"	Miodrag Božinovski	Miodrag Božinovski	Stipica Kalođera	Vančo Tarabunov
"Lutaj sam"	Zoran Markulj	Ruža Auguštin	Zlatko Dvoržak	Sandra Kulier
"Uspomena"	Pero Ćuković	Pero Ćuković	Stipica Kalođera	Tihomir Bralić
"Zemlja se vrti"	Tomaž Mancini	Tomaž Mancini	Jure Robežnik	Meta Močnik
"Kad sunce zalazi"	Miroslav Mihajlović	Miodrag Mihajlović	Radan Bosner	Boro Platiša
"Kara te gozlum"	Husein Kazas	Orhan Dišo	Bojan Adamič	Husein Kazas
"Tike – ti"	Zoran Grgurić	Zoran Grgurić	Ivan Kelemen	Senada Kospić
"Kroz tužnu umornu jesen"	Koši Halim	Nada Petrović	Jovan Adamov	Ratko Kraljević
"Susret"	Vladimir Delač	Marjan Kašaj	Igor Savin	Grešnici
"Sanjala sam"	Zoran Markulj	Ruža Auguštin	Zvonimir Skerl	Daniela Pančetović
"Lutanja"	Vladimir Marković and R. Lovrić	Vladimir Marković and R. Lovrić	Zvonimir Skerl	Vlada i Bajka
"Ne ke me poznavaš"	Dragan Mijalkovski	Đoko Georgijev	Jane Kodžabašija	Dragan Mijalkovski
"Nek se ljudi čude"	Gabor Lenđel	Gabor Lenđel	Franjo Jenč	Ljubiša Lolić
"Vrati se"	Dragan Mijalkovski	Dragan Mijalkovski	Kire Kostov	Lena Trajkovska
"Pevaj moju pesmu"	Zoran Salčić	Dušan Mihajlović	Franjo Jenč	Marjan Dugec

=== Awards ===
- First Prize – "Tražim" by Srđan Marjanović
- Second Prize – "Pred kraj neba" by Nenad Pavlović
- Third Prize – "Kara Gozlum" by Husein Kazas
- Audience's Choice First Prize – "Ti ne znaš dom gdje živi on" by Vlado Miloš
- Audience's Choice Second Prize – "Nek se ljudi čude" by Ljubiša Lolić
- Audience's Choice Third Prize – "Sanjala sma" by Zoran Markulj
- Best Lyrics Award – "Pred kraj neba" by Dušan Govedarica
- Best Interpretation Award – Srđan Marjanović
- Youngest Composer Award – Božidar Vučur
- Youngest Performer Award – Gazmend Palaska

== 1974 ==
On the fourteenth edition of the festival the Union of Composers of Yugoslavia Award was introduced.

=== Awards ===
- First Prize – "Ostanite tu" by Faruk Hasanbegović; performed by Ivica Tomović
- Second Prize – "Legenda" by Predrag Jovičić; performed by San
- Third Prize – "I gde je ljubav" by Slavica Stojković; performed by Sunce
- Audience's Choice First Prize – "Ostanite tu" by Faruk Hasanbegović; performed by Ivica Tomović
- Audience's Choice Second Prize – "Ona" by Milan Ukić; performed by Borivoje Platiša
- Audience's Choice Third Prize – "Nemam vremena" by Gabor Lenđel; performed by Iver
- Union of Composers of Yugoslavia Award – "Duša in jaz" by Marko Brecelj; performed by Marko Brecelj
- Best Interpretation Award – Borivoje Platiša

== 1975 ==
The fifteenth edition of the festival was the first one organised by Subotica Youth Center and Radio Television Novi Sad. It was marked by an unusual move: all 22 competing compositions were proclaimed the winning compositions.

== 1976 ==
650 compositions were sent to the contest, from all parts of Yugoslavia, but also from Yugoslavs living abroad, 24 of which were chosen to compete at the festival. The festival was held in Subotica Sports Hall, in front of more than 5,000 spectators.

=== Awards ===
- First Prize – "Mojot son" by Jordan Velinov; performed by Marija Ćuruvija
- Second Prize – "Daj na neba" by Miladin Šobić; performed by Miladin Šobić
- Third Prize – "I rešeto ima buze" by Ivica Čotić; performed by Zajedno
- Fourth Prize – "Gde ćeš biti, lepa Kejo" by Ljubiša Lolić; performed by Suncokret
- Audience's Choice First Prize – "Ti si ta što ja znam" by Mane Kolovski; performed by Momir Nikolovski
- Audience's Choice Second Prize – "Ona je tu" by Zoran Ristivojević; performed by Marjan Miše
- Audience's Choice Third Prize – "I rešeto ima buze" by Ivica Čotić; performed by Zajedno

== 1977 ==
The festival featured three parts: the competition, rock evening, featuring well known and less known rock acts, and the evening of patriotic songs, entitled "Mladi pevaju Titu" ("Youth Sings to Tito"). The organizers decided to include the evening of patriotic songs in every future edition of the festival.

=== Awards ===
- First Prize – "Zašto ponekad iz sna me bude zvuci nečijeg pijanina" by Ivo Lesić; performed by Đorđe Apostolovski
- Second Prize – "Ne kucaj, srce, tako nemirno" by Mustafa Ismailovski; performed by Vesna Kartuš
- Third Prize – "Koliko puta" by Zoran Todorović; performed by Hava
- Audience's Choice Award – "Ne kucaj, srce, tako nemirno" by Mustafa Ismailovski; performed by Vesna Kartuš

=== Non-competitive program ===
- Leb i Sol
- Teška Industrija
- Sonori
- Drago Mlinarec
- Suncokret
- Ibn Tup
- Jadranka Stojaković
- Miladin Šobić

== 1978 ==
Omladinski festival was considered something you had to graduate from in order to even appear on our [Yugoslav] [music] scene. It was a dream for all of us that had played our guitars on our [apartment buildings]' stoops and stairwells. I was even naive enough to mail my material [to Subotica] several times, believing that they've got a commission there that carefully combs through it all before sending out invitations. But the first time they actually invited me was after some of my, let's say, hits had already brought me some attention: first "U razdeljak te ljubim" with Žetva [...] then "Prva ljubav" with Rani Mraz. No one [from the festival] even asked me what we [Rani Mraz] would be performing. I did some 3 or 4 songs, one of which was "Računajte na nas", which at that point in time and in that place really resonated because we all loved that country back then. It wasn't a pro-regime, communist song. Later on it got a little twisted, receiving some other labels, and I stopped performing it when I realized it was being used for [political] sloganeering. However, beck then when it functioned as a patriotic song, it had a certain [true] emotion... I remember, that year, the festival [also] had Galija, Atomsko Sklonište, etc. and when I came off stage [following the performance] into the backstage area I recall everyone being on the verge of tears. Looking back on that song now, its emotion is probably somewhat clumsily undercut by my decision as its author to mention Tito explicitly in the lyrics. I shouldn't have done that. The songs was strong enough even without him. However, the times back then were such that even a douchebag off the street like me, having never been a member of any communist organizations, decided to bring him up in a song. Who could've thought at the time that my songs would have a longer shelf life than Tito [and Titoism]. But that song really did leave a strong impression in Subotica that year. Getting that reaction there stayed with me as a big moment and success in the initial part of my career. Considering how much that festival meant to me, I really haven't been mentioning it enough, probably due to all the subsequent weirdness that song generated.

— Đorđe Balašević in 2010 recalling Rani Mraz's 1978 appearance at the festival.

The eighteenth edition of the festival was held from 11 to 13 May, in Subotica National Theatre and Subotica Sports Hall.

Rani Mraz's performance on the evening of patriotic tunes would go on to become one of the most memorable moments in festival's history. On this occasion, the band for the first time publicly performed their song "Računajte na nas" ("We Can Be Counted On"), which—in addition to expressing devotion to the Yugoslav lifetime president Josip Broz Tito—praises his guerrilla fighters' participation in World War II (known in the Yugoslav historiography as the People's Liberation War (NOB)) from the perspective of the country's youth born after World War II, embodied in the band and its 25-year-old singer Đorđe Balašević who also authored the song. Despite not winning any of the prizes at the festival, the song left the biggest impression on its audience and would go on to wide-spread popularity in Yugoslavia.

Released as a seven-inch single later that year, "Računajte na nas" became an unofficial anthem of the Yugoslav youth, receiving extensive air play in the country's electronic media. It would further be generally extolled in the country's public sphere as a positive example of the post-war communist youth respecting its elders and their "ultimate sacrifice in the struggle against fascism". The song further became omnipresent at various communist events, national holidays, and commemorative anniversaries in Yugoslavia such as the running of the Relay of Youth, Liberation Day, and Republic Day. Eventually, by the mid 1980s, the song would also be heard at student protests and political rallies via being chanted by protesters and political party activists. By 1987, its author and singer Balašević—who had by this point built a successful solo career in Yugoslavia—stopped performing the song live and semi-renounced it.

=== Awards ===
- First Prize – "Kad prođe vreme" by Miomir Pavlović; performed by Miomir Pavlović and Icina Deca
- Second Prize – "Igraj, Makedonko" by Sotir Spasevski; performed by BT Top
- Third Prize – "Zbogom, Bijelo Dugme" by Jerko Šunjko; performed by Vitomir Petković
- Audience's Choice First Prize – "Uz huk mora" by Mirsad Huljić; performed by Zoran Miladinović
- Audience's Choice Second Prize – "Ne mogu srce da prevarim" by Bodin Starčević; performed by Mira Ostojić
- Audience's Choice Third Prize – "Neko te drugi ljubi" by Ivica Čotić; performed by Ivica Čotić
- Best Interpretation Award – Mira Ostojić

=== Non-competitive program ===
- Džambo Džet
- Korak
- Galija
- Atomsko Sklonište
- Generacija 5
- Rani Mraz
- Laboratorija Zvuka
- Igra Staklenih Perli
- Meta Sekcija
- Tako

== 1979 ==
The nineteenth edition of the festival was held from 17 to 19 May. It was crucial in festival's transition from competition of young composers to competition of young rock acts. Prior to the nineteenth edition, unaffirmed rock bands were invited to perform at the festival, but only in the non-competitive part, with mostly pop, pop rock and soft rock acts competing for awards; in 1979, the organizers decided that from this edition all unaffirmed acts which were invited to perform would be competing for awards. The competition featured 37 compositions.

The bands Pekinška Patka and Prljavo Kazalište were the first punk rock acts to perform at the festival. These two bands did not apply for the competition, but, alongside progressive rock band Boomerang and jazz rock band Den Za Den, got special invitation from the festival director Vitomir Simurdić, who wanted the festival to move away from pop format. Boomerang won the First Prize, Pekinška Patka won the Audience's Choice Second Prize, and Prljavo Kazalište was disqualified from the contest after performing gay-related song "Neki dječaci". Then little known musicians Robert Funčić and Vesna Vrandečić, who performed Funčić's song "Veruj mi" and won Audience's Choice First Prize, would two years later form the band Xenia.

=== Awards ===
- First Prize – "Živjeti iznad tebe barem dan" by Zlatko Klun; performed by Boomerang
- Second Prize – "Dubina" by Aleksandar Dujin; performed by Meta Sekcija
- Third Prize – "Stiže poslednji autobus" by Branko Kovačić; performed by Branko Kovačić
- Audience's Choice First Prize – "Veruj mi" by Robert Funčić; performed by Robert Funčić, Vesna Vrandečić and Marijan Balina.
- Audience's Choice Second Prize – "Bela šljiva" by Nebojša Čonkić; performed by Pekinška Patka
- Audience's Choice Third Prize – "Stiže poslednji autobus" by Branko Kovačić; performed by Branko Kovačić
- Best Interpretation Award – Obećanje Proleća (performing "1979" by Branko Bogunović)

== 1980 ==
It had never happened before, nor would ever again this many hot, new performers arrive to Subotica in a single year. This edition of the festival would be remembered as exceptional in every way, including the date—the festival had regularly been held in May, in accordance with the practice of holding youth events in the month of relay and Tito's birthday. But that year, May was the month of nationwide grief, so Omladina Festival was postponed until autumn. Thanks to that rescheduling, a lot of bands that had just been making their first steps in the May of that year entered the program: Električni Orgazam, Idoli, Šarlo Akrobata, Haustor, and if we add Film and Na Lepem Prijazni [...] it becomes clear that Subotica in the autumn of 1980 was one of the most interesting and most important meeting points in the history of Yugoslav rock. Most of those musicians, arriving from different cities, would meet each others and hear each other perform for the very first time here. Fuzzy and foggy ideas musicians from Zagreb had about the new scene in Belgrade—and vice versa—would be given image and tone here.

— Igor Mirković in 2003

The festival in Subotica was a key event, because we spent several days with those guys [from the other bands], and those several days seemed like several weeks. It was very motivating [...] we were some sort of newly-found heroes to each other, and we tried to live up to that heroic mission.

— Darko Rundek (formerly of Haustor) in 2003

Due to the death of Josip Broz Tito on 4 May, the twentieth edition of the festival was, instead in May, held in October. Twenty-four compositions competed for the awards. All three prizes by the jury and all three by the audience were given to rock bands. The festival anniversary was celebrated with performances of numerous artists who received acknowledgment after appearing on the festival: Bisera Veletanlić, Dalibor Brun, Kemal Monteno, Tomaž Domicelj, Lutajuća Srca, Miladin Šobić, Jadranka Stojaković, Leb i Sol, Boomerang and others. On its anniversary, the festival received numerous accolades: the Seven Secretaries of SKOJ Award, the Liberation of Subotica Award, the Radio Belgrade Golden Microphone Award, the PGP-RTB Silver Plaque, the FIDOF Award and several others.

The twentieth edition of the festival is notable as one of the most important moments in the history of Yugoslav new wave scene, as it included performance of some of the most notable new wave acts from Belgrade and Zagreb: Šarlo Akrobata, Idoli, Električni Orgazam, Film and Haustor. As on the previous edition of the festival, young bands did not apply for the competition, but got special invitations from the festival director Vitomir Simurdić. Other bands which got the invitation were the jazz rock band Na Lepem Prijazni and Zasilni izhod and ska band Kontraritam. Film would be Awarded the First Prize, Šarlo Akrobata the Second Prize and Idoli the Audience's Choice Third Prize. The organizers initially did not take Električni Orgazam into consideration, but were persuaded to include the band into the program by Riblja Čorba leader Bora Đorđević. Električni Orgazam caused a scandal with their performance, which included damaging microphones and cymbals and destroying colored light bulbs which were part of the scenery, and were disqualified from the competition.

=== Awards ===
- First Prize – "Neprilagođen" by Jura Stublić; performed by Film
- Second Prize – "Ona se budi" by Milan Mladenović; performed by Šarlo Akrobata
- Third Prize – "Masaž" by Vojko Aleksić; performed by Na Lepem Prijazni
- Audience's Choice First Prize – "Szulettem" by Sabo Zoltan; performed by Eridanus
- Audience's Choice Second Prize – "Gdje sam sad" by Branko Dabić; performed by Pauk
- Audience's Choice Third Prize – "Zašto su danas devojke ljute" by Vlada Divljan and Srđan Šaper; performed by Idoli
- Best Interpretation Award – Mateja Koležnik

=== Non-competitive part ===
- Stevan Zarić
- Bisera Veletanlić
- Dalibor Brun
- Ratko Kraljević
- Kemal Monteno
- Tomaž Domicelj
- Lutajuća Srca
- Ivica Tomović
- Verica Ristevska
- Miladin Šobić
- Sabri Fejhulahu
- Jadranka Stojaković
- Leb i Sol
- Boomerang

== 1981 ==
On the twenty-first edition of the festival the Journalists' Award for Best Lyrics was introduced.

The competitors included young new wave bands Petar i Zli Vuci, Stidljiva Ljubičica, Modeli, Lačni Franz, Buldogi, Piloti, Termiti, Čista Proza and La Strada, all of them later becoming notable acts of the Yugoslav rock scene.

=== Awards ===
- First Prize – "Ogledalo" by Petar i Zli Vuci; performed by Petar i Zli Vuci
- Second Prize – "Moj prijatelj ide u vojsku" by Zlatko Đurašin; performed by Stidljiva Ljubičica
- Third Prize – "Jutarnji modeli" by Vjeko Zajec; performed by Modeli
- Audience's Choice First Prize – "Uzalud te čekam" by Milorad Nonin; performed by Dragica Stankov and Radio Television Novi Sad Big Band
- Audience's Choice Second Prize – "Moj prijatelj ide u vojsku" by Zlatko Đurašin; performed by Stidljiva Ljubičica
- Audience's Choice Third Prize – "Biće bolje" by Dimitrije Maksić; performed by Osma Sila
- Best Interpretation Award – Lačni Franz (performing "Šank rock")
- Journalists' Award for Best Lyrics – Radivoj Šajtinac

== 1982 ==
=== Awards ===
- First Prize – "Kar si skuhal, pojej" by Andrej Turku; performed by Martin Krpan
- Second Prize – "Sladoled za vrane" by Đorđe Vasić; performed by Makakus
- Third Prize – "Volim svoju povratnu kartu Sisak-Zagreb" by Mladen Šestić; performed by Zmijski Ugriz Mladog Lava
- Audience's Choice First Prize – "Sladoled za vrane" by Đorđe Vasić; performed by Makakus
- Audience's Choice Second Prize – "Čupave glave" by Metro; performed by Metro
- Audience's Choice Third Prize – "Za dan, za san" by Vlasta Topličić; performed by Život
- Best Interpretation Award – Meri Trošeljeva of Tadaima (performing "Pitaš li me kuda odlaze ptice")
- Journalists' Award for Best Lyrics – Tadaima (performing "Pitaš li me kuda odlaze ptice")

== 1983 ==
At the twenty-third edition of the festival, held from 19 to 26 May, 36 compositions competed for awards. On this edition, rock compositions and pop compositions were finally separated. Two separate competitions were held: Rock Evening and Schlager Evening.

The hard rock band Kerber, which won the Rock Evening First Prize, would two months after the festival release their debut album and become one of the most popular bands on the Yugoslav hard rock scene. The best Interpretation Award was won by little-known young singer Mladen Vojičić of the band Top, who would a year later gain nationwide popularity when he became the new singer of Bijelo Dugme.

=== Awards ===
- Rock Evening First Prize – "Mezimac" by Zoran Stamenković; performed by Kerber
- Rock Evening Second Prize – "Nekje k votu" by Đorđe Vasić; performed by Ultimat
- Rock Evening Third Prize – "Karasko" by Ljupče Karo; performed by Tokmu Taka
- Schlager Evening First Prize – "1. maj" by Miljenko Šercer; performed by Miljenko Šercer
- Schlager Evening Second Prize – "Sve je muzika" by Ivana Vitaljić; performed by Ivana Vitaljić
- Schlager Evening Third Prize – "Doviđenja, doviđenja" by Ljupčo Stojanovski; performed by Ljupčo Stojanovski
- Audience's Choice Award – "Cesta" by Dragan Pavković; performed by Parudaštri
- Best Interpretation Award – Mladen Vojičić of Top (performing "Lagala si")

== 1984 ==
The twenty-fourth edition of the festival was held from 17 to 20 May. A smaller number of awards was given than during the previous editions, partially due to funding problems. On the Rock Evening, for the first time the award was given to the band for their complete performance, not for one composition.

The First Prize on the rock evening was won by the band Automobili. The prize included the recording of a studio album. As they were already working in studio on their debut album, they decided to give up on the prize in favor of the runner-up, the band Beta Centaury. With the release of their debut album later that year Automobili would rise to popularity. The band Zabranjeno Pušenje was invited to perform in the non-competitive part, but refused due to the fact that their applications from the time when they were an unaffirmed band were regularly refused.

=== Awards ===
- Rock Evening First Prize – Automobili
- Schlager Evening First Prize – "Balada za..." by Matej Zakonjšek; performed by Matej Zakonjšek
- Audience's Choice Award – "Nemoj da mi kažeš" by Ljilja Mladenović and M. Stanisavljević; performed by Ljilja Mladenović and Tina Mladenović
- Best Interpretation Award – Gordana Kostić and Goran Despotović (performing "Milo moje")
- Journalists' Award for Best Lyrics – "Balada za..." by Matej Zakonjšek; performed by Matej Zakonjšek

== 1985 ==
=== Awards ===
- First Prize – Rock 'n' Feller (Ljubljana)
- Audience's Choice Award – Rock Street (Belgrade)

== 1986 ==
In 1986, the concept of competition of composers was officially abandoned, the festival was renamed to Festival pop i rok muzike (Festival of Pop and Rock Music) and became a competition of young unaffirmed bands.

=== Awards ===
- First Prize – Bas Dans (Banja Luka)
- Audience's Choice Award – Bas Dans

== 1987 ==
The 1987 edition of the festival was marked by the jury's decision that all the bands which entered the finals – KUD Idijoti, Indust Bag, Mizar, Tužne Uši and Grad – are the winners. With the exception of Tužne Uši, all of the bands would rise to prominence, KUD Idijoti becoming one of the most notable punk rock bands and Mizar one of the most notable dark wave bands on the Yugoslav scene. The alternative rock band Center Za Dehumanizacijo, which would later also rise to prominence, also competed, but did not manage to enter the finals.

The non-competitive part included notable rock acts – Električni Orgazam, Gast'r'bajtr's, Kerber, Bambinosi, Autopsia, Tutti Frutti Balkan Band – as well as acts which would rise to fame in the following years – Zijan, Dr. Steel, Let 3, Blues Trio, Vrisak Generacije, Grč, Cacadou Look.

=== Competitors ===
- Indust Bag (Metlika)
- Plastic Face (Lazarevac)
- KUD Idijoti (Pula)
- Heavy Company (Jesenice)
- Grad (Rijeka)
- Bojler (Idrija)
- Center Za Dehumanizacijo (Trate)
- Oslobodioci (Obrenovac)
- Tužne Uši (Split)
- Mizar (Skopje)

=== Winners ===
- KUD Idijoti
- Indust Bag
- Mizar
- Tužne Uši
- Grad

=== Non-competitive program ===
- Zijan
- S.O.R.
- Električni Orgazam
- The End Band
- Gast'r'bajtr's
- Bać Franje Iđe U Feketić
- Heroji Ulice
- Anno Dominni
- Aragon
- A Train
- Bolid
- Dr. Steel
- Let 3
- Blues Trio
- Jovančić Jazz Quartet
- Trio Dejana Pečenka
- Vrisak Generacije
- Grč
- Cacadou Look
- Bambinosi
- Gasmasks
- Dr Živago Dark Stars
- Autopsia
- Tikmajer Formatio
- Bas Dans
- Human Telex
- Kerber
- Fit
- Radio
- Tutti Frutti Balkan Band

== 1988 ==
Both the First Prize and the Audience's Choice Award were won by the band Zijan, which, a year later, also won both the First Prize and the Audience's Choice Award at the Zaječar Gitarijada Festival.

=== Competitors ===
- Del Arno Band (Belgrade)
- Ludi Gavran (Belgrade)
- Keith (Banja Luka)
- Idejni Nemiri (Rijeka)
- Sing Sing Singers (Novi Sad)
- Zijan (Gevgelija)
- Laufer (Rijeka)
- Saygon (Skopje)

=== Awards ===
- First Prize – Zijan
- Audience's Choice Award – Zijan

== 1989 ==
=== Competitors ===
- Arhangel (Skopje)
- Telo – Nauka Sovršena (Struga)
- Obojeni Program (Novi Sad)
- Super Nova (Skopje)
- Civili (Zaječar)
- Greaseballs (Zagreb)
- Ponoćni Kauboj (Novi Sad)
- Torpeda (Sarajevo)
- Nesalomivi (Belgrade)

=== Awards ===
- First Prize – Torpeda
- Audience's Choice Award – Torpeda

== 1990 ==
As Yugoslav Wars started in 1991, this edition of the festival would be the last before the anniversary edition in 2011.

=== Competitors ===
- Daleka Obala (Split)
- Royal Albert Hall (Skopje)
- Budweiser (Belgrade)
- Strogo Zaupno (Ruše)
- Majke (Vinkovci)
- Strelnikoff (Štore)
- Kleopatra (Skopje)
- Deca Loših Muzičara (Belgrade)

=== Awards ===
- First Prize – Deca Loših Muzičara
- Audience's Choice Award – Deca Loših Muzičara
- Journalists' Choice Award – Deca Loših Muzičara

== 2011 ==
In 2011, in order to mark the festival's 40th anniversary, a concert was held in Subotica Sports Hall, featuring numerous artists who gained first acknowledgements after their appearance on the festival. The performers were accompanied by orchestra led by Gabor Bunford. The bands Lutajuća Srca, Suncokret and Rezonansa all made reunions just for this occasion, while the band Generacija 5 reunited in the original lineup.

=== Performers ===
- Leo Martin
- Kemal Monteno
- Ibrica Jusić
- Zafir Hadžimanov
- Vlada i Bajka
- Lado Leskovar
- Rezonansa
- Bolid
- Srđan Marjanović
- Bisera Veletanlić
- Lutajuća Srca
- Tomaž Domicelj
- Suncokret
- Borivoj Platiša
- Slave Dimitrov
- Ratko Kraljević and Vesna Čipčić
- Dušan Svilar
- Stevan Zarić
- Kornelije Kovač and Saša Vasić
- Maja Odžaklievska
- Atomsko Sklonište
- Generacija 5
- Severni Vetar
- Goran Šepa
- Mi
- Narcis Vučina
- Sylvester Levay

== 2015 ==
The 2015 edition of the festival was held on 30 May at the Stadium of Small Sports in Subotica, attracting an audience of around 2,500 people. The festival featured more around 25 performers from eight different countries. The competitive program featured eight young and unsigned bands, selected from 42 applications.

The competition was won by Tevarbulebra from Niš, followed by Raskid 13 from Pančevo in second place and Dingospo Dali from Belgrade in third.

The non-competitive program featured Repetitor and Partibrejkers, with particular attention given to Repetitor, one of the most prominent young bands in Serbia at the time, representing a new generation of the Serbian and regional rock scene and later influencing a new generation of alternative rock bands.

The festival was organized by Dejana Baltes (Youth Office of the City of Subotica), Armand Mesaroš (Junior Music Studio), Dario Kostić (Hardbooking) and Damir Tahiri (Studio 11).

=== Performers ===
- Raskid 13
- Tevarbulebra
- Dingospo Dali
- Bombshelter Experiment
- Garage in July (Croatia)
- Parapet (Montenegro)
- Neprijatno mi je
- UpRize
- Pionir 10
- Straight Mickey and the Boys
- Nebo je crveno
- Ana Never
- Nafta
- D Zoo
- All the Arms We Need
- Omladinac 11
- Mile Me Deaf (Austria)
- Trojnik (Slovenia)
- Mršavi Pas
- Maple & Mahogany (United States)
- Wooden Ambulance Solo – Goran Grubišić
- Repetitor
- Partibrejkers
- Nava Spatiala (Romania)
- DJ Polly (Russia)

== See also ==
- List of historic rock festivals
