= Lutajuća Srca =

Serbian and Yugoslav rock band

- Lutajuća Srca best known-lineup in 1974, from left to right: Milan Marković, Spomenka Đokić, Miroljub Jovanović

Background information
- Origin: Niš, SR Serbia, SFR Yugoslavia
- Genres: Rock; acoustic rock; soft rock; pop rock
- Years active: 1970–1984; 1994–1998; (Reunions: 1994, 2011, 2015, 2016, 2019)
- Labels: PGP-RTB, Diskoton
- Past members: Spomenka Đokić; Milan Marković; Miroljub Jovanović; Vladimir Stojanović; Žarko Aćimović; Vladan Stanojević; Vesna Koljević; Rista Trajković; Vesna Topolčević; Elvira Ignjatović; Radomir Crnomarković

Lutajuća Srca (Serbian Cyrillic: Лутајућа Срца, trans. The Wandering Hearts) was a Serbian and Yugoslav rock band formed in Niš in 1970. They were one of the most notable representatives of the 1970s Yugoslav acoustic rock scene.

During the initial years, a number of musicians passed through the band, with vocalist Spomenka Đokić, known for her trademark soprano, and guitarists Milan Marković and Miroljub Jovanović remaining the core members of the band, Lutajuća Srca eventually becoming a musical trio. During the 1970s, the band had several hit songs and won numerous awards at Yugoslav pop festivals. Lutajuća Srca disbanded in the mid-1980s, after releasing three studio albums and a number of 7-inch singles. The group reunited in 1998 for the recording of one studio album, and made several one-off reunions during the 2010s.

== History ==
=== 1970–mid-1980s ===
The band's history begins in 1970, when Milan Marković, a student of the Niš Faculty of Arts, and Miorljub Jovanović, a student of the Niš Faculty of Occupational Safety, spent their summer in Šušanj as scouts, performing popular songs on acoustic guitars by the campfire. When their company was invited to visit scouts in the nearby Bečići, they met Spomenka Đokić, also from Niš. Upon their return to Niš, the three formed Lutajuća Srca. The band's first lineup featured Spomenka Đokić (vocals), Milan Marković (guitar, piano, cello, backing vocals), Miroljub Jovanović (guitar, backing vocals), Vladimir Stojanović (guitar), Žarko Aćimović (bass guitar) and Ljubomir Ignjatović (drums). The members decided to name the group after the first two songs they composed, "Putnik" ("Traveller") and "Srce" ("Heart") – "Putujuća Srca" (The Travelling Hearts). However, Aćimović's girlfriend-at-the-time suggested the name Lutajuća Srca (The Wandering Hearts), which the members chose over Putujuća Srca. Initially, the band performed their own songs, as well as covers of songs by The Who, Free, Creedence Clearwater Revival and other foreign bands. Several months after the formation, Aćimović was replaced by Vladan Stanojević.

The band made their first recordings, of the songs "Putnik" and "Srce", on a reel-to-reel audio tape recorder and gave them to the local members of the League of Socialist Youth, who broadcast the songs on the walkway by the Nišava river, a popular gathering place for the Niš youth. The recordings were soon broadcast on Radio Niš, and, after a number of calls from the listeners, the station decided to offer the band time in studio to make professional recordings. The band's songs, written by Jovanović and Marković, and Đokić's coloratura soprano brought them large media attention.

On the 1972 Festival Omladina in Subotica the band won the First Prize, the Audience Choice First Prize and the Best Lyrics Award for their song "Još malo" ("A Little Bit More"). After this event, the band turned towards acoustic sound, in the new lineup, featuring, besides Spomenka Đokić, Milan Marković, Miroljub Jovanović and Vladan Stanojević, Vesna Koljević (piano) and Rista Trajković (flute). During the following years, Trajković was occasionally replaced on live performances by flutists Rade Ivanović and Dragan Miloradović. The same year they won three awards at Festival Omladina, the band released their debut 7-inch single, featuring the songs "Još malo" and "Za tebe" ("For You"), for PGP-RTB record label, and started holding regular concerts every Saturday and Sunday in Niš Youth Centre.

In 1973, at the Vaš šlager sezone (Your Schlager of the Season) festival, they won the Union of Composers of Yugoslavia Award for their song "Jefimija", written by Dženan Salković and inspired by the life and work of medieval Serbian poet Jefimija. They released the song on a 7-inch single, with the song "Pruži ruke" ("Give Me Your Hands") as the B-side. During the same year, they won the first place on the Zagreb Music Festival with the song "Brod za sreću" ("Boat Sailing to Happiness"). This song was released on a 7-inch single with the song "U sumrak" ("At Dusk") as the B-side during the same year. In 1973, the band also made numerous guest appearances on TV shows, held a concert in Zagreb club Kulušić with singer-songwriter Drago Mlinarec and jazz rock band Time, and represented Yugoslavia on the World Festival of Youth and Students held in East Berlin. In 1974, they appeared on the Vaš šlager sezone festival with the song "Poslednje jutro" ("The Last Morning"), on the Belgrade Spring Festival with the song "Ti si tu" ("You Are There"), and on the Opatija Festival with the song "Godine – konkurs" ("Years – Competition").

In 1974, the band released their debut album, entitled Lutajuća Srca 1 as a trio consisting of Đokić, Marković and Jovanović. The album was recorded in Ljubljana and produced by Jure Robežnik. Alongside the songs which had already appeared on their 7-inch singles, the album featured new songs "Starac i more" ("The Old Man and the Sea"), "Rastanak" ("The Parting"), "Tiše srce" ("Be Quiet, Heart"). After the album release, Lutajuća Srca went on several joint tours with singer Zdravko Čolić and singer-songwriter Kemal Monteno and performed as the opening band for the Scottish group Middle of the Road on their concert in Skopje. During 1974, the band members wrote music for Dragoslav Lazić's film Košava, also appearing in the film as a group of hippies, and for Stole Janković's TV series Partizani (Partisans). The song "Oni su se zavoleli" ("They Fell in Love"), composed for Košava on the lyrics of writer Milovan Vitezović, and the song "Slutnja" ("Worry"), composed for Partizani on the lyrics of singer-songwriter and poet Arsen Dedić, were released on a 7-inch single. After the release of Košava and Partizani, the band got numerous invitations from theatres to write music for theatre plays.

In 1975, Đokić left the band to dedicate herself to her studies, recording her only solo release, the 7-inch single with the songs "Uvelo lišće" ("Dead Leaves") and "Tiše, tiše zatvaraj vrata" ("Close the Door Quietly, Quietly"). She was replaced by Vesna Topolčević. With her as the vocalist, Lutajuća Srca recorded the 7-inch single with the songs "Verujem u ljubav" ("I Believe in Love") and "Poruka kiše" ("Message of the Rain"). After the single release, the band made a hiatus as Marković and Jovanović went to serve their mandatory stints in the Yugoslav People's Army. After their return from the army, they continued their activity with the new singer, Elvira Ignjatović.

At the end of the 1970s, Spomenka Đokić returned to the band. In 1981, the band released the album Strepnja (Worry) for PGP-RTB. The songs "U poznu jesen" ("In the Late Autumn"), written on the lyrics of Serbian 19th-century poet Vojislav Ilić, and "Večernja pesma" ("An Evening Poem"), written on the lyrics of American 19th-century poet Sidney Lanier, saw large radio play. During the same year, they released the album of scout songs entitled Šuma je izviđaču drug (The Forest Is a Scout's Friend). The album was recorded with the support of the Scout Association of Serbia and the Scout Association of Niš. The group ended their activity in mid-1980s.

=== Post-breakup ===
After Lutajuća Srca disbanded, Spomenka Đokić started working as a music teacher. Miroljub Jovanović worked as the manager of the Josip Kolumbo cultural centre and the assistant manager of the Niš National Theatre. He was one of the founders of the Niš Musical Festivities festival and the art gallery of the Niš Cultural Center. For a number of years, he was one of the organizers of the Niš Film Festival and the Choir Festivities festival, as well as of the Festival of Serbian Film in Vienna. He was one of the founders of Alternative Theatre Scene and Treća polovina (Third Half) theatres. Since 1993, he was the music editor on the Belle Amie radio, and later an editor and host on the Belle Amie TV. Milan Marković became a cellist in Niš Symphony Orchestra. He wrote music for over 30 theatre plays and formed several musical groups: ethnic music group Catena Mundi, vocal ensemble Naissus and old city music band Groš. In 2003, he won two awards on the Italian music festival Music of the World for his composition "Niška Banja" and for his musical arrangement for the traditional song "Oj, Moravo" ("Hey, Morava").

=== 1994–1998 ===
In 1994, Đokić, Marković and Jovanović reunited to perform in Radio Television of Serbia show Dobra stara vremena (Good Old Days), a studio concert featuring bands from the 1970s acoustic rock scene. They continued their activity recording their fourth studio album Sanjam te noćas (Tonight I'm Dreaming of You), self-released it in 1998.

=== 2010s reunions ===
In the 2010s Đokić, Marković and Jovanović reunited on several occasions. In 2011, the band reunited to perform, alongside Leo Martin, Kemal Monteno, Ibrica Jusić, Zafir Hadžimanov, Vlada i Bajka, Rezonansa, Srđan Marjanović, Bisera Veletanlić, Tomaž Domicelj, Suncokret, Kornelije Kovač, Maja Odžaklievska, Atomsko Sklonište, Generacija 5, Goran Šepa, Sylvester Levay and other acts, on the Festival Omladina 40th anniversary edition. In 2015, the band reunited to perform, alongside Nikola Čuturilo, Dragoljub Đuričić, Zoran Predin and other acts, on a concert held on the Niš Fortress. In 2016, the band reunited to perform, alongside Daltoni, Tommy & Vanna and Vlada Jet Band, on a concert in Niš, as a part of Rok muzej (Rock Museum) project exhibition.

In 2016, a documentary film about the band, entitled Lutajuća Srca – arhiv emocija (Lutajuća Srca – Archive of Emotions) was released. The film was directed by Vladan Ristić and featured, besides the band members, musicians Zdravko Čolić, Kornelije Kovač, Nenad Milosavljević, Srđan Marjanović, Biljana Krstić, actor Radoš Bajić, and others.

In 2019, the band celebrated their 50th anniversary with a concert in Niš Army Hall. On the concert, Đokić and Jovanović performed with guitarist and painter Radomir Crnomarković.

=== Jovanović's and Marković's deaths ===
On 3 December 2020, Miroljub Jovanović died from COVID-19. Four months later, on 20 March 2021, Minja Marković died. Between their deaths, on 25 December 2020, the band was awarded the 11 January Award, awarded by the city of Niš to meritorious collectives and individuals.

== Legacy ==
In 2006, the song "Jefimija" was ranked No. 94 on the B92 Top 100 Domestic Songs list.

In 2020, the band was awarded the 11 January Award, awarded by the city of Niš to meritorious collectives and individuals.

== Discography ==
=== Studio albums ===
- Lutajuća Srca 1 (1974)
- Strepnja (1981)
- Šuma je izviđaču drug (1981)
- Sanjam te noćas (1998)

=== Singles ===
- "Još malo" / "Za tebe" (1972)
- "Putnik" / "San" (1973)
- "Jefimija" / "Pruži ruke" (1973)
- "Balada o barbi" / "Svetlosti jutra" (1973)
- "Brod za sreću" / "U sumrak" (1973)
- "Slutnja" / "Oni su se zavoleli" (1974)
- "Poslednje jutro" / "Godine" (1974)
- "Ti si tu" / "Luta srce moje" (1974)
- "Naša ljubav" / "Peščani grad" (1974)
- "Verujem u ljubav" / "Poruka kiše" (1975)
- "Strepnja" / "Zaboravi me" (1979)
