= Yugoslavia in the Eurovision Song Contest 1989 =

- Eurovision Song Contest 1989
- Participating broadcaster: Jugoslavenska radiotelevizija (JRT)
- Country: Yugoslavia
- Selection process: National final
- Selection date: 4 March 1989

Competing entry
- Song: "Rock Me"
- Artist: Riva
- Songwriters: Rajko Dujmić; Stevo Cvikić

Placement
- Final result: 1st, 137 points

Participation chronology

Yugoslavia was represented at the Eurovision Song Contest 1989 with the song "Rock Me", composed by Rajko Dujmić, with lyrics by Stevo Cvikić, and performed by the band Riva. The Yugoslavian participating broadcaster, Jugoslavenska radiotelevizija (JRT), selected its entry through a national final. The entry eventually won the Eurovision Song Contest for the first and only time for Yugoslavia.

== Before Eurovision ==
=== National final ===
Jugoslavenska ratiotelevizija (JRT) held a national final to select their entry for the Eurovision Song Contest 1989. The national final was a cooperation and competition between eight of the subnational broadcasters that made up JRT at the time: RTV Beograd (SR Serbia), RTV Ljubljana (SR Slovenia), RTV Novi Sad (SAP Vojvodina), RTV Priština (SAP Kosovo), RTV Sarajevo (SR Bosnia and Herzegovina), RTV Skopje (SR Macedonia), RTV Titograd (SR Montenegro), and RTV Zagreb (SR Croatia). Each broadcaster submitted their own songs, provided their own jury, and managed the broadcasting of the contest.

The national final had several names in TV-guides from the time, such as: "Izbor jugoslovanske popevke za Pesem Evrovizije '89" in Slovene; and "Izbor pesme JRT za Pesmu Evrovizije 89" in Serbo-Croatian. The title card at the beginning of the national final read "Pesma Evrovizije '89 JRT Finale". However, the national final along with every other Yugoslav national final has been referred to post hoc as Jugovizija by several sources.

==== Competing entries ====
JRT opened a submission period for interested songwriters to submit entries to one of the eight subnational broadcasters until 15 December 1988. Each subnational broadcaster selected one song to go forward to the national final, and up to three others to be sent to an expert JRT jury, consisting of members from all eight subnational broadcasters. The expert JRT jury selected another eight entries from the submissions that were sent to it, therefore sixteen songs competed in total. The expert JRT jury consisted of Vartkes Baronijan, Kiril Vangelov, Lado Leskovar, Nikica Kalogjera, Petar Jurić, Slobodan Bućevac, Milan Stupar, and Akil Koci. Sources say that around 200 or more submissions were received in total by all sub-national broadcasters.

Competing entries
Artist	Song	Songwriter(s)		Conductor	Broadcaster	Language
Artist	Song	Composer(s)	Lyricist(s)	Conductor	Broadcaster	Language
Ana Kostovska	"Umesto da se ljubimo" (Уместо да се љубимо)	Gabor Lenđel	Željko Samardžić	Kornelije Kovač	(Socialist Autonomous Province of Vojvodina) RTV Novi Sad	Serbo-Croatian
BG Sound	"Voli me opet" (Воли ме опет)	Dejan Petković		Slobodan Marković	(Socialist Republic of Serbia) RTV Beograd	Serbo-Croatian
Biljana Krstić and Srđan Marjanović	"Još jedan poljubac za kraj" (Још један пољубац за крај)	Zdravko Đuranovic	Zdravko Đuranovic; Duška Maksimović	Radovan Papović	(Socialist Republic of Montenegro) RTV Titograd	Serbo-Croatian
Caffe, Mojca and Marta	"Kadar sem sama"	Tomaž Kozlevčar	Miša Čermak	Emil Spruk	(Socialist Republic of Slovenia) RTV Ljubljana	Slovene
Foto Model	"Neću da te delim" (Нећу да те делим)	Boban Džeferdanović		Slobodan Marković	(Socialist Autonomous Province of Vojvodina) RTV Novi Sad	Serbo-Croatian
Frenki	"Reka bez povratka" (Река без повратка)	Rade Radivojević	Goran Cvetković	Milivoje Marković	(Socialist Republic of Serbia) RTV Beograd	Serbo-Croatian
Jasna Zlokić	"Sve duge godine" (Све дуге године)	Rajko Dujmić	Stevo Cvikić	Nikica Kalogjera	(Socialist Republic of Croatia) RTV Zagreb	Serbo-Croatian
Jelena Džoja and Ambasadori	"Kad ljubav umire" (Кад љубав умире)	Slobodan Vujović		Ranko Rihtman	(Socialist Republic of Bosnia and Herzegovina) RTV Sarajevo	Serbo-Croatian
Lidija Kočovska and Family	"Tajna" (Тајна)	Dimitar Masevski	Ljupčo Stojanovski	Aleksandar Džambazov	(Socialist Republic of Macedonia) RTV Skopje	Macedonian
Massimo Savić	"Plavi anđeo" (Плави анђео)	Zrinko Tutić	Zrinko Tutić; Miroslav Rus	Nikica Kalogjera	(Socialist Republic of Croatia) RTV Zagreb	Serbo-Croatian
Pop Design	"Baby Blue"	Tadej Hrušovar	Janez Hvale	Stipica Kalogjera	(Socialist Republic of Slovenia) RTV Ljubljana	Slovene
Riva	"Rock Me"	Rajko Dujmić	Stevo Cvikić	Nikica Kalogjera	(Socialist Republic of Croatia) RTV Zagreb	Serbo-Croatian
Toni Janković	"Pričaj mi" (Причај ми)	Faruk Hasanbegović	Cornelia Schoenfeld-Oljača	Ranko Rihtman	(Socialist Republic of Bosnia and Herzegovina) RTV Sarajevo	Serbo-Croatian
Trio Rona	"Fjollat"	Vlora Januzi		Shefqet Hoxha-Sheki	(Socialist Autonomous Province of Kosovo) RTV Priština	Albanian
Vesna Ivić and Tedi Bajić	"Pregrni me nežno" (Прегрни ме нежно)	Kiril Cvertkovski		Aleksandar Džambazov	(Socialist Republic of Macedonia) RTV Skopje	Macedonian
Zdravko Škender and Intervali	"Ogan gori" (Оган гори)	Slave Dimitrov	Vasil Pujovski	Aleksandar Džambazov	(Socialist Republic of Macedonia) RTV Skopje	Macedonian

==== Final ====
The national final was held in the Serbian National Theatre in Novi Sad at 21:00 CET on 4 March 1989, and was organised by RTV Novi Sad. The show was hosted by Dina Čolić and Bosko Negovanović. The RTV Novi Sad Orchestra accompanied each performance, with different conductors for each entry. Interval acts were provided by the RTV Novi Sad Orchestra, Moulin Rouge, Josipa Lisac, and Daniel.

The results were decided by three jurors in each of the eight subnational broadcasters handing out points in a 7-5-3-2-1 fashion, with 7 points going to their favourite song.

The contest was broadcast on several channels of JRT. It is known to have been broadcast on television on Televizija Zagreb 1, Televizija Ljubljana 1, Televizija Beograd 1, Televizija Priština, and Televizija Novi Sad.

Final - 4 March 1989
R/O	Artist	Song	Points	Place
1	Jelena Džoja and Ambasadori	"Kad ljubav umire"	26	7
2	Caffe, Mojca and Marta	"Kadar sem sama"	13	12
3	BG Sound	"Voli me opet"	54	3
4	Massimo Savić	"Plavi anđeo"	65	2
5	Zdravko Škender and Intervali	"Ogan gori"	18	10
6	Riva	"Rock Me"	66	1
7	Trio Rona (Note: Due to technical issues during the performance, Trio Rona was allowed to perform again after all the performances.)	"Fjollat"	7	15
8	Toni Janković	"Pričaj mi"	8	14
9	Vesna Ivić and Tedi Bajić	"Pregrni me nežno"	38	4
10	Pop Design	"Baby Blue"	20	9
11	Jasna Zlokić	"Sve duge godine"	34	5
12	Ana Kostovska	"Umesto da se ljubimo"	14	11
13	Frenki	"Reka bez povratka"	4	16
14	Lidija Kočovska and Family	"Tajna"	29	6
15	Biljana Krstić and Srđan Marjanović	"Još jedan poljubac za kraj"	26	7
16	Foto Model	"Neću da te delim"	10	13

Entries submitted by broadcaster whose jury members were voting

Detailed jury voting
R/O	Song	RTV Sarajevo			RTV Ljubljana			RTV Beograd			RTV Zagreb			RTV Skopje			RTV Priština			RTV Novi Sad			RTV Titograd			Total
R/O	Song	Zlatko Daniš	Miroljub Mitrović	Ismet Arnautalić	Mario Rijavec	Brane Küzmič	Simona Weiss	Vojkan Borisavljević	Branka Šaper	Maja Sabljić	Anja Šovagović-Despot	Đorđe Novković	Drago Diklić	Ljubomir Brangjolica	Sinolička Trpkova	Dimitar Čemkov	Gjon Gjevelekaj	Liliana Çavolli	Ivana Vitalić	Đorđe Balašević	Mladen Vranešević	Žarko Petrović	Mirsad Serhatlić	Bojan Bajramović	Rade Vojvodić	Total
1	"Kad ljubav umire"		2										2							2		1	7	5	7	26
2	"Kadar sem sama"	7		1	3	2																				13
3	"Voli me opet"	5	1	3				5	5	7		2	3				1	1	5	3		5	3	2	3	54
4	"Plavi anđeo"		3		7	7	5	7	3	5	7	5		1	5				1	7					2	65
5	"Ogan gori"					1	2					1	1	3	2	7								1		18
6	"Rock Me"		7	7							3	3	5			3	7	7	7		7	7	2		1	66
7	"Fjollat"										1						2	2	2							7
8	"Pričaj mi"	3		5																						8
9	"Pregrni me nežno"				5		7	3	7					5	3	2		3	3							38
10	"Baby Blue"				1	5	3		1		2						3	5								20
11	"Sve duge godine"	2	5	2		3		1		1	5	7	7										1			34
12	"Umesto da se ljubimo"							2	2	2				2	1						2			3		14
13	"Reka bez povratka"				2		1									1										4
14	"Tajna"	1												7	7	5				5	1	3				29
15	"Još jedan poljubac za kraj"									3										1	3	2	5	7	5	26
16	"Neću da te delim"																5				5					10

== At Eurovision ==
The contest was broadcast on television on: TV Beograd 1, TV Novi Sad, and TV Zagreb 1, all with commentary provided by Oliver Mlakar; and on TV Ljubljana 1, TV Prishtina, and TV Skopje 1.

Riva was the twenty-second and last performer on the night of the contest, following Germany. Their song "Rock Me" won the contest with a score of 137 points and won the contest.

=== Voting ===
Points awarded to Yugoslavia
Score	Country
12 points	Ireland; Israel; Turkey; United Kingdom
10 points	Austria; Belgium; Denmark
8 points	Netherlands; Sweden
7 points	Finland; Norway
6 points	Iceland
5 points	Cyprus; Luxembourg; Switzerland
4 points	Portugal
3 points	France
2 points	
1 point	Germany

Points awarded by Yugoslavia
Score	Country
12 points	Sweden
10 points	Finland
8 points	Italy
7 points	Israel
6 points	United Kingdom
5 points	Austria
4 points	Turkey
3 points	France
2 points	Ireland
1 point	Denmark
