= Dženan =

Male given name

- Gender: Male

Other gender
- Feminine: Dženana

Origin
- Meaning: Beloved, garden, paradise

Other names
- Variant form: Džanan

Dženan is a male given name.

In the Balkans, Dženan is popular among Bosniaks in the former Yugoslav nations.

The name may have been derived from the Arabic word jinan (جِنَان), which translates to 'garden' - this word refers to one of the levels of entering jannah (جَنَّة), or paradise, and is considered equivalent to the Garden of Eden. The name might also be a South Slavic version of the Persian name Janan (جانان), which means "beloved."

The name has a variant: Džanan (for example, Džanan Musa). It also has a female equivalent: Dženana (for example, Dženana Šehanović).

== Given name ==
- Dženan Čišija (born 1976), Swedish politician
- Dženan Ćatić (born 1992), Bosnian retired footballer
- Dženan Đonlagić (born 1974), Bosnian politician and economist
- Dženan Haračić (born 1994), Bosnian footballer
- Dženan Hošić (born 1976), Bosnian football manager
- Dženan Lončarević (born 1975), Serbian pop singer
- Dženan Osmanović (born 2000), Bosnian footballer
- Dženan Pejčinović (born 2005), German footballer
- Dženan Radončić (born 1983), Montenegrin retired footballer
- Dženan Salković (1945-1989), Bosnian singer, songwriter, and doctor
- Dženan Uščuplić (1975-2024), Bosnian retired footballer
- Dženan Zaimović (born 1973), Bosnian football manager
