= Lendel =

Lendel or Lenđel is a surname. Notable people with the surname include:

- Gabor Lenđel (born 1951), Serbian musician
- Miglė Lendel (born 1996), Lithuanian track cyclist
- Nevena Lenđel (born 1979), Croatian high jumper
