= Sarajevo, ljubavi moja =

Single by Kemal Monteno

from the album Moje pjesme, moji snovi
- Released: 1976
- Recorded: 1975
- Genre: Pop
- Length: 3:10
- Label: Jugoton
- Songwriter(s): Kemal Monteno

"Sarajevo, ljubavi moja" (lit. 'Sarajevo, love of mine') is a single released by Bosnian singer-songwriter Kemal Monteno in 1976. The tune has in subsequent decades gained a cult following and is considered an evergreen homage to the city of Sarajevo. Monteno had named the single his favorite, and the song was played at his funeral.
