= Teška Industrija =

Bosnian and Yugoslav rock band

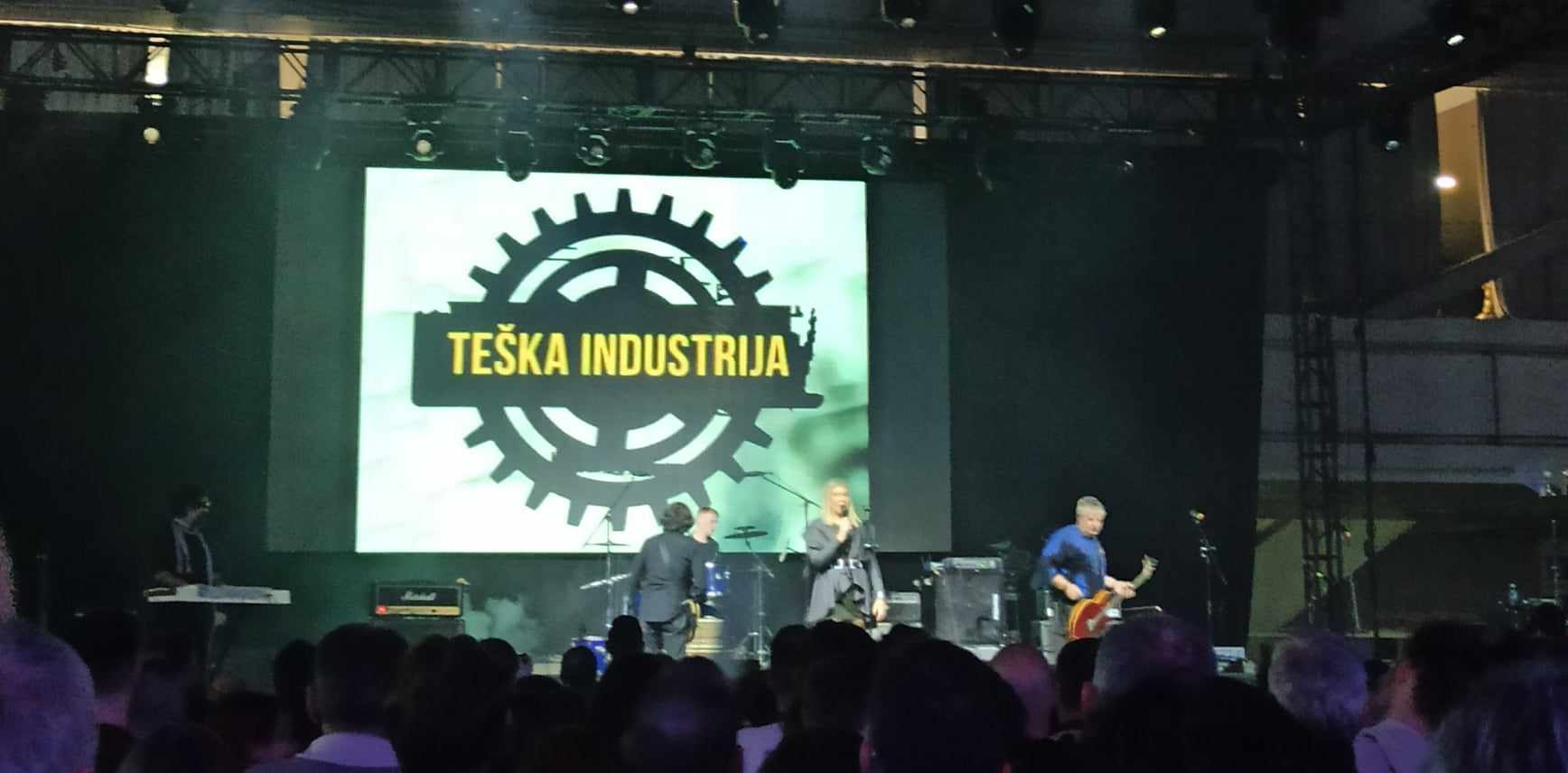
- Teška Industrija performing in Belgrade in 2022

Background information
- Origin: Sarajevo, Bosnia and Herzegovina
- Genres: Hard rock; progressive rock; arena rock; pop rock
- Years active: 1974–1978; 1984; 1991; 1996; 2005–present
- Labels: Jugoton, Sarajevo Disk, Sound Galaxy, Krin Music, Juka, Art of Voice, Megaton, Croatia Records, Hit Records
- Members: Vedad Hadžiavdić; Ivica Propadalo; Robert Domitrović; Fran Šokić; Gabijela Babić
- Past members: Gabor Lenđel; Senad Begović; Fadil Toskić; Seid Memić; Sanin Karić; Goran Kovačević; Aleksandar Kostić; Munib Zoranić; Darko Arkus; Narcis Lalić; Sead Trnka; Zoran Krga; Alen Mustafić; Đani Pervan; Dino Olovčić; Marko Lazić; Igor Razpotnik; Lea Mijatović; Zrinka Majstorović; Maja Bajamić; Lucija Lučić; Matea Matković
- Website: www.teska-industrija.com

Teška Industrija (trans. Heavy Industry) is a Bosnian and Yugoslav rock band formed in Sarajevo in 1974.

The group was formed in 1974 by keyboardist Gabor Lenđel, guitarist Vedad Hadžiavdić, bass guitarist Ivica Propadalo, drummer Senad Begović and vocalist Fadil Toskić, gaining attention of the public after Toskić was replaced by Seid Memić "Vajta". The band gained popularity with their debut album, Ho ruk, which was followed by the successful album Teška Industrija, recorded in the new lineup, featuring vocalist Goran Kovačević. After Lenđel's departure from the band in 1977, Teška Industrija moved away from their initial progressive-influenced hard rock towards more conventional hard rock sound to little commercial success, releasing one more album before disbanding in 1978.

After the disbandment of the original incarnation of Teška Industrija, Hadžiavdić reformed the band on three occasions, in 1984, 1991 and 1996, the group releasing studio albums which saw little attention of the media and the audience. In 2005, Lenđel, Hadžiavdić, Propadalo and Memić reunited to mark the band's 30th anniversary with a concert, which led to the release of the reunion album Kantina. After the album, Hadžiavdić and Propadalo continued the band's activity with a group of younger musicians, fronted by female vocalist Lea Mijatović.

As of 2024, two incarnations of the band are active – one featuring the band's original guitarist Vedad Hadžiavdić and original bass guitarist Ivica Propadalo, and the other featuring original keyboardist and former leader Gabor Lenđel and the band's best-known vocalist Seid Memić, the latter two recording the album Putničnki voz uspomena in 2024 in order to mark the band's 50th anniversary, releasing it under the name Teška Industrija.

== History ==
=== 1974–1978: Formation, mainstream popularity and disbandment ===
The band was formed in 1974 in Sarajevo by keyboardist Gabor Lenđel, who assembled a line-up with Vedad Hadžiavdić (formerly of COD, guitar), Ivica Propadalo (formerly of COD, bass guitar), Senad Begović (formerly of Formula 4, drums) and Fadil Toskić (formerly of Ajani, vocals). Lenđel started his career as a teenager, forming the band Suze Mladih Krokodila (Young Crocodiles' Tears) in 1964, in which he played guitar. He continued his career as the guitarist and the leader of the jazz rock band Entuzijasti (The Enthusiasts), formed in 1968. He gained the attention of the public in 1970, when his song "Padao je sneg" ("The Snow Was Falling") was performed on the Subotica Youth Festival by Mihajlo Kovač (brother of better known musician Kornelije Kovač) and won the Audience's Award. At the beginning of the 1970s, Lenđel worked as a producer for the Radio Belgrade show Veče uz radio (Evening by the Radio), while also actively competing in athletics. As he was offered a contract by an athletics club from Sarajevo, he moved to the city, where he enrolled in the Sarajevo Music Academy. He soon started cooperating with the music show Na ti (Per tu), composing for a number of performers, and started playing organ in the band Rok (Rock), forming Teška Industrija in 1974. The band was named after a verse from the song "Čisti zrak" ("Clean Air"), written two years earlier by poet Duško Trifunović and singer-songwriter Narcis Vučina.

After a modest start, the band gained the attention of the public with the arrival of vocalist Seid Memić "Vajta", formerly of the band Veziri (The Viziers). In September 1975, a former Formula 4 member Sanin Karić replaced Propadalo, who dedicated himself to painting and designing album covers. The band soon released their first records, two 7-inch singles, the first with the songs "Karavan" ("Caravan") and "UFO", and the second with their version of the traditional sevdalinka song "Aj, kolika je Jahorina planina" ("Oh, How Big Is Jahorina Mountain") and "Kovači sreće" ("Fortune Makers"). With their first releases, the group presented themselves with melodic hard rock sound, dominated by Lenđel's organ. In 1976, the band released their debut album, entitled Ho ruk (Hi Ho), through Jugoton record label. The album lyrics were written by Duštko Trifunović, Ranko Boban and Dušanka Haleta. It attracted attention with the songs "Bijeg" ("The Escape"), "Koncert tročinski" ("Three Act Concert"), and "Od Olova do Trnova" ("From Olovo to Trnovo"), the latter inspired by the Igman march. In the summer of 1976, on the insistent of their record label, the band appeared on the Split Festival with the light-hearted "Život je maskenbal" ("Life Is a Masquerade"), achieving large success with the song.

At the end of 1976, Memić left Teška Industrija and formed his own band, Zmaj od Bosne (Dragon of Bosnia), appearing with them on the 1977 edition of the BOOM Festival, and soon after starting a solo career. Soon after Memić's departure, Karić left the band to join Bijelo Dugme as a touring member. Teška Industrija was joined by the vocalist Goran Kovačević (formerly of the band Čisti Zrak), bass guitarist Aleksandar Kostić, drummer Munib Zoranić and keyboardist Darko Arkus, with Lenđel and Hadžiavdić remaining the only two original members. The new lineup recorded the band's second album, entitled simply Teška Industrija. All of the songs were composed by Lenđel, and most of the lyrics were written by Duško Trifunović. The album's most prominent song was the rock epic "Nikola Tesla". The song "Položio sam ruke u travu" ("I Laid My Hands on the Grass") was written by Lenđel during the time he spent in the band Rok, and "Štefanija" ("Stephania"), with part of its lyrics in Hungarian, featured Lenđel on vocals. The song "Ala imam ružnu curu" ("How Ugly Is My Girl"), with lyrics written by Ranko Boban, was a cover of a song by the Hungarian band Skorpio. However, on the album the song was not credited to Skorpio members, and this fact caused a media scandal in Yugoslavia when it was revealed by the Yugoslav music press.

Lenđel envisioned the band's third studio album as the group's farewell release – the album was entitled Zasviraj i za pojas zadeni, the title being a traditional saying which could be translated as Play Your Instrument, But Know When to Put It Aside, and the closing track on the album was entitled "Odlazi Teška Industrija" ("Teška Industrija Is Leaving"). After the album recording sessions ended, Lenđel left to serve his mandatory stint in the Yugoslav army, ending his work with the band. After his army service ended, he moved to Novi Sad, where he worked as a composer, producer and arranger. The rest of the group decided to continue performing together, but did not see large success. After the album release, they toured Poland during July 1978. Soon after the tour, the band ended their activity. After the group disbanded, Goran Kovačević worked with Laza Ristovski and Ipe Ivandić on their album Stižemo, and in the 1980s released two solo albums.

=== 1984, 1991 and 1996 reformations ===
In 1984, Hadžiavdić and Zoranić reformed the band. The new lineup featured Vedad Hadžiavdić on guitar, Munib Zoranić on drums, Narcis Lalić on vocals, Sead Trnka on bass guitar and Zoran Krga on keyboards. The new lineup released the album Ponovo sa vama (With You Again). The songs were composed by Hadžiavdić, and the lyrics were written by Hadžiavdić, Duško Trifunović, Husein Vladović and Mladen Vojičić Tifa. Despite commercial pop rock sound, the album failed to attract the attention of the audience, and soon after the album release the group disbanded for the second time.

In 1991, Hadžiavdić reformed the band once again. The new lineup featured Sead Trnka (bass guitar), Alen Mustafić (vocals), Đani Pervan (drums) and Dino Olovčić (keyboards). The band recorded the album Gospode ne daj da je sanjam (Lord, Don't Let Me Dream of Her). Released through minor record label Sound Galaxy in the wake of the Yugoslav Wars, the album saw little attention of the media, and the group disbanded for the third time.

After the end of the Yugoslav Wars, Hadžiavdić and Alen Mustafić released two studio albums, Sarajevska noć (Sarajevo Night) and Ruže u asfaltu (Roses in Asphalt), both in 1996 through Slovenian record labels in their attempt to revive the group, but these recordings saw little success.

=== 2005–2024: Reunion and the new incarnation of the band ===
In 2005, Teška Industrija reunited in the lineup featuring Gabor Lenđel, Vedad Hadžiavdić, Ivica Propadalo and Seid Memić to mark the band's 30th anniversary with a concert in the cinema hall on the Croatian island of Murter. Although the concert should have featured the band's original drummer, Senad Begić, he did not manage to travel to Croatia from the United States, where he resides, so the drums on the concert were played by Ivan Tržun. The reunion led to the recording of the new album, Kantina (Canteen), recorded by Lenđel, Hadžiavdić, Propadalo, and Memić, with new members Marko Lazarić (drums) and Igor Razpotnik (keyboards). The album was produced by Nikša Bratoš, and featured the band's old songs in new arrangements, as well as new songs, written by Zlatan Fazlić. The song "Nas dvoje" ("The Two of Us") featured guest appearance by singer-songwriter Arsen Dedić. Dedić also made a guest appearance on Teška Industrija version of his old song "Ti si se nekako smanjio" ("Somehow You Shrunk"). The album also featured covers of Indexi songs "Ruke pružam" ("I'm Reaching Out") and "Ti si mi bila naj, naj" ("You Were the Best, the Best").

After the album release, Hadžiavdić and Propadalo continued to work as Teška Industrija with a group of new members, female vocalist Lea Mijatović, keyboardist Zrinka Majstorović and drummer Robert Domitrović. In 2010, they released the album Nazovi album pravim imenom (Use the Right Name for the Album) and in 2011, the album Bili smo raja (We Were Friends), the latter featuring covers of songs by Sarajevo acts like Indexi, Bijelo Dugme, Plavi Orkestar, Crvena Jabuka, Kemal Monteno, and Halid Bešlić. In 2011, the band was joined by keyboardist Fran Šokić. In the spring of 2013, prior to Croatia joining the European Union, the band recorded the joking song "EUdala se lijepa naša" ("Our Beautiful Got EUmarried") with the Bosnian actress Zana Marjanović. The band marked their 40th anniversary with a concert in the Vatroslav Lisinski Concert Hall in Zagreb with numerous guests and the release of the double compilation album XL Nakon! (XL After!). The group appeared on the 2015 Zagreb Festival with the song "Još gorim od tebe" ("I'm Still Burning After You").

In 2016, the band released their latest studio album, Selfie. The song "Jednom daje nam bog" ("God Gives Us Only Once") featured guest appearance by singer Željko Bebek, the song "Žena za utjehu" ("Woman for Comfort") featured guest appearance by Slavonia Band, and "Majske kiše" ("May Rains") featured guest appearance by singer-songwriter Kemal Monteno. In 2017, for a large Nikola Tesla exhibit in Zagreb, the band recorded two new versions of their song "Nikola Tesla" with singer Goran Karan, a Serbo-Croatian and an English language version, with lyrics for the latter written by Karan. The song was released on the joint compilation album The Best of 2017.

During recent years, the band has changed several vocalists: Maja Bajamić, Lucija Lučić, Matea Matković and Gabijela Babić.

=== 2024–present: Two incarnations of the band ===
In 2024, in order to mark the band's 50th anniversary, Gabor Lenđel, Seid Memić and Aleksandar Kostić, alongside guitarist Vedran Božić (formerly of Boomerang and Time) and drummer Petar "Peco" Petej (formerly of Delfini) recorded the hard rock-oriented album Putnički voz uspomena (Passenger Train of Memorries), releasing it under the name Teška Industrija. The album cover was designed by well-known artist Dragan S. Stefanović, who also designed cover for Teška Industrija's second album. The album featured a cover of Narcis Vučina's song "Teška industrija", after which the band was named. In an interview following the album release, Lenđel stated that, although he formed the band, he never legally registered the name Teška Industrija, but that he considers only first three studio albums as the real Teška Industrija releases, and that Hadžiavdić and Propadalo continued to use the name Teška Industrija after the group's 2005 reunion out of "nostalgic reasons".

== Legacy ==
In 1998, the album Teška Industrija was polled as 95th on the list of 100 Greatest Yugoslav Popular Music Albums in the book YU 100: najbolji albumi jugoslovenske rok i pop muzike (YU 100: The Best Albums of Yugoslav Pop and Rock Music).

Serbian singer Srdjan Popov recorded a swing version of the song "Život je maskenbal" on his 2011 EP Swing 011.

== Discography ==
=== Studio albums ===
- Ho ruk (1976)
- Teška Industrija (1976)
- Zasviraj i za pojas zadjeni (1978)
- Ponovo sa vama (1984)
- Gospode ne daj da je sanjam (1991)
- Sarajevska noć (1996)
- Ruže u asfaltu (1996)
- Kantina (2007)
- Nazovi album pravim imenom (2010)
- Bili smo raja (2011)
- Selfie (2016)
- Putnički voz uspomena (2024)

=== Compilation albums ===
- Teška Industrija (1995)
- Karavan (Izvorne snimke 1975–1976) (2002)
- The Ultimate Collection (2008)
- The Best of 2017 (2017)
- XL Nakon! (2013)

=== Singles ===
- "Karavan" / "UFO" (1975)
- "Kolika je Jahorina planina"/ "Kovači sreće" (1975)
- "Kadija" / "Šta je rekla Ana" (1975)
- "Život je maskenbal" / "Našem putu kraja nema" (1976)
- "Štap" / "Nepoznata pjesma" (1976)
- "Igraj mala opa, opa" / "Otišla je ljubav moja" (1977)
- "Alaj mi je večeras po volji" / "Ja i ti i ljubav naša" (1977)
