= Željko Samardžić =

Bosnian and Serbian singer (born 1955)

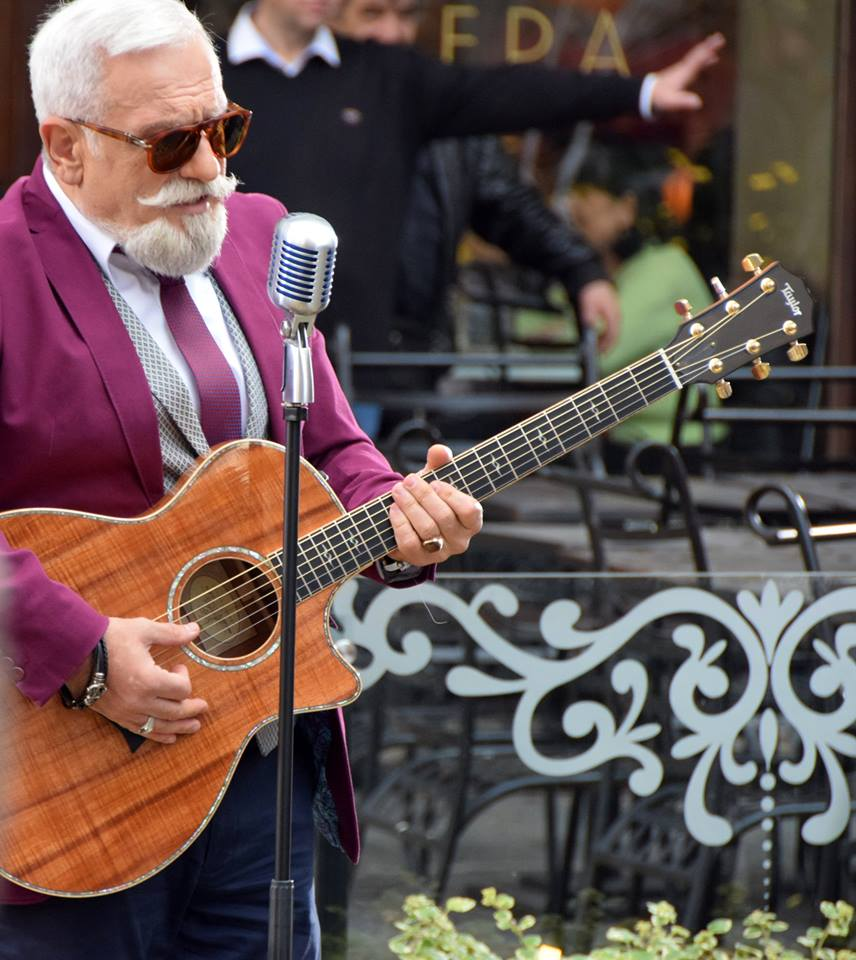
- Samardžić performing in 2017

Background information
- Born: 3 October 1955 (age 70); Mostar, PR Bosnia and Herzegovina, FPR Yugoslavia
- Genres: Folk, folk rock, adult contemporary
- Occupation: Singer
- Instruments: Vocals, guitar
- Years active: 1994–present

Željko Samardžić (Cyrillic: Жељко Самарџић; born 3 October 1955) is a Bosnian and Serbian folk singer who is popular throughout the former Yugoslav republics. Born in Mostar, he achieved fame after having to move to Belgrade as a result of the Bosnian War.

== Biography ==
=== Early life ===
Samardžić was born in Mostar, at the time part of PR Bosnia and Herzegovina, in FPR Yugoslavia. His father Milivoje was from Montenegro, and his mother Nada was a Croat from the Ilići suburb of Mostar. Samardžić's father was a Yugoslav People's Army officer, which meant that the family had to move around a lot. After spending the first seven years of his life in Mostar, young Željko lived and attended school in Nikšić, Igalo and Zadar before eventually returning to Mostar during his teenage years.

He first started singing during high school, and soon became known around Mostar as a good Kemal Monteno impersonator. Samardžić's musical activity during this period was essentially little more than a hobby as he did not put out any official releases and mostly sang in kafanas and restaurants in addition to competing in the occasional obscure festival. The closest he came to wide mainstream success was a schlager "Moja Marija je drugačija" that became a hit in Bosnia during the 1970s after he performed it at Prvi aplauz festival in Banja Luka, but he mostly earned his living running a café in Mostar, located in proximity of the famous Old Bridge.

When the Bosnian War broke out in 1992, Željko was wounded sitting in his apartment while chaotic fighting was raging outside. A stray bullet entered his leg and exited his hip. After much trouble, along with his wife and their daughter, he managed to flee the city through the Croat-controlled western part of Herzegovina and eventually reach Serbia after going through Croatia, Slovenia and Hungary. Once in Serbia, they lived in the Belgrade suburb of Borča and Samardžić soon started getting low-paying gigs in various discothèques and cafés, building up a fairly devoted niche audience. Almost 40 years old at this point, his big break came unexpectedly when some businessmen who enjoyed his nightclub performances brought him to the elite club Ambassador and also financed him with DM30,000 to record an album with Marina Tucaković and Aleksandar "Futa" Radulović. In 1995, he also appeared at the Pjesma Mediterana festival in Budva, where he left a great impression singing "Sipajte mi još jedan viski", which further opened the doors to show business.

=== Music career ===
In May 2010, he collaborated with Dalmatian singer Jelena Rozga on the song "Ima nade" ("There Is Hope"), and the accompanying music video was filmed in Split, Croatia by Željko Petres.

On 11 March 2026, Željko caught widespread media attention by singing his hit song "9000 milja" together with Serbian street singer and guitarist Dušan Crnobrnja at Knez Mihailova Street in Belgrade. Their spontaneous performance was received with applause from the audience and was shared on the latter 's Instagram account.

== Personal life ==
Samardžić is married to Maja Džaferović, with whom he has three daughters, Sanja, Danijela and Minja, and has three grandchildren Luka, Aleksa and Nina.

== Discography ==
=== Studio albums ===
- Jednom kad nam dođu sijede (1987)
- Želja (1990)
- Oko tvoje neverno (1993)
- Sudbina (1995)
- Sećanje na ljubav (1996)
- Zveket srca (1997)
- Sve je moje tvoje (1999)
- Sentimentalan čovek (2001)
- Pokaži mi šta znaš (2004)
- Lice ljubavi (2006)
- Kojim dobrom mila moja (2009)
- Mila (2017)

Awards and achievements
Preceded by Makadam	Pjesma Mediterana winner 1995	Succeeded by Bisera Veletanlić
