= Gabor Lenđel =

- Born: Gabor Lenđel; April 11, 1951 (age 75); Subotica, PR Serbia, FPR Yugoslavia
- Genres: Hard rock; progressive rock; rock; children's music
- Occupations: Composer; keyboardist
- Instrument: Keyboards
- Years active: 1964–present
- Labels: Jugoton, Croatia Records

Gabor Lenđel (Serbian Cyrillic: Габор Ленђел; Hungarian: Gábor Lengyel; born 11 April 1951) is a Serbian and Yugoslav musician, composer and music producer and former athlete of Hungarian descent, known as the leader of the rock band Teška Industrija, as well as for his work as composer of popular and theatre music.

== Biography ==
=== Early career (1964–1974) ===
Gabor Lenđel was born in Subotica on 11 April 1951. He started his musical career as a teenager, forming the band Suze Mladih Krokodila (Young Crocodiles' Tears) in 1964, in which he played guitar. He continued his career as the guitarist and the leader of the jazz rock band Entuzijasti (The Enthusiasts), formed in 1968. He gained the attention of the public in 1970, when his song "Padao je sneg" ("The Snow Was Falling") was performed on the Subotica Youth Festival by Mihajlo Kovač (brother of better known musician Kornelije Kovač) and won the Audience's Award.

At the beginning of the 1970s, Lenđel worked as a producer for the Radio Belgrade show Veče uz radio (Evening by the Radio), while also actively competing in athletics, participating in the 1969 European Athletics Championships. As he was offered a contract by an athletics club from Sarajevo, he moved to the city, where he enrolled in the Sarajevo Music Academy. He soon started cooperating with the music show Na ti (Per tu), composing for a number of performers, and started playing organ in the band Rok (Rock).

=== Teška Industrija (1974–1977, 2005, 2024) ===
Lenđel formed Teška Industrija in Sarajevo in 1974. He assembled a line-up featuring Vedad Hadžiavdić (guitar), Ivica Propadalo (bass guitar), Senad Begović (drums) and Fadil Toskić (vocals). After a modest start, the band gained the attention of the public with the arrival of vocalist Seid Memić "Vajta". With their first 7-inch singles, the group presented themselves with melodic hard rock sound, dominated by Lenđel's organ. In 1976, the band released their debut album, entitled Ho ruk (Hi Ho), to large mainstream success. The band's second album, entitled simply Teška Industrija, was recorded with new vocalist Goran Kovačević and released in 1976. By the time of the album release, Lenđel and Hadžiavdić were the only two remaining original members of the group. Although he took part in the recording sessions for the band's third album, Zasviraj i za pojas zadeni (the title being a traditional saying which could be translated as Play Your Instrument, But Know When to Put It Aside), at the time of the album release in 1978, Lenđel was serving his mandatory stint in the Yugoslav army and was not an official member of the band. The rest of the group continued to perform together, but did not see large commercial and critical success and disbanded at the end of 1978. After the disbandment, Hadžiavdić reformed the band on three occasions, in 1984, 1991 and 1996, the group releasing studio albums which saw little attention of the media and the audience.

In 2005, Teška Industrija reunited in the lineup featuring Gabor Lenđel, Vedad Hadžiavdić, Ivica Propadalo and Seid Memić to mark the band's 30th anniversary with a concert in the cinema hall on the Croatian island of Murter. The reunion led to the recording of the new album, Kantina (Canteen), recorded by Lenđel, Hadžiavdić, Propadalo, and Memić, with new members Marko Lazarić (drums) and Igor Razpotnik (keyboards). After the album release, Hadžiavdić and Propadalo continued the band's activity with a group of younger musicians.

In 2024, in order to mark the band's 50th anniversary, Gabor Lenđel, Seid Memić and former Teška Industrija bass guitarist Aleksandar Kostić, alongside guitarist Vedran Božić and drummer Petar "Peco" Petej, recorded the album Putnički voz uspomena (Passenger Train of Memorries), releasing it under the name Teška Industrija. In an interview following the album release, Lenđel stated that, although he formed the band, he never legally registered the name Teška Industrija, but that he considers only first three studio albums as the real Teška Industrija releases, and that Hadžiavdić and Propadalo continued to use the name Teška Industrija after the group's 2005 reunion out of "nostalgic reasons".

=== Solo works (1978–present) ===
After his army service ended, Lenđel moved to Novi Sad, where he got a job at Radio Novi Sad as a music producer and arranger. During the following years, he produced albums by Bisera Veletanlić, Miladin Šobić, Garavi Sokak and other acts.

Lenđel wrote the rock opera Zöld Hajú Lany (Green-haired Girl), which was the first rock opera in Hungarian language. The opera was performed in the National Theatre in Subotica, and in 1982, released on the album Rock Opera "Zöld Hajú Lany" – Zelenokosa. Lenđel played keyboards on the recording and produced the album. Lenđel also wrote the rock opera Pastir vukova (Shepherd of the Wolves) and the operette Somborska ruža (Sombor Rose), as well as children's musicals Mikica milicioner (Mikica the Militiaman) and Suncokret (Sunflower). His songs composed for children's theatre plays were released on the album Ćiribu ćiriba (Hocus Pocus). He cooperated with prominent theatre director Ljubiša Ristić.

In the early 1990s, with the outbreak of Yugoslav Wars, Lenđel emigrated to South Africa, and later moved to Hungary, where he initially worked in a brick manufacturing company and as a marketing manager, and later worked as a music teacher in the Serbian Gymnasium Nikola Tesla in Budapest, as a music editor on the TV5 channel and co-founded the Serbian Theatre. In 2011, he reestablished the Subotica Youth Festival.

In 2022, Croatia Records released the double compilation album Gold Collection, featuring his songs composed for various artists as well as his instrumental compositions.

== Awards and honors ==
- Pro urbe Award by the Subotica City Council (2010)

== Legacy ==
In 1998, the album Teška Industrija was polled as 95th on the list of 100 greatest Yugoslav popular music albums in the book YU 100: najbolji albumi jugoslovenske rok i pop muzike (YU 100: The Best albums of Yugoslav pop and rock music).

== Discography ==
=== With Teška Industrija ===
==== Studio albums ====
- Ho ruk (1976)
- Teška Industrija (1976)
- Zasviraj i za pojas zadjeni (1978)
- Kantina (2005)
- Putnički voz uspomena (2024)

==== Singles ====
- "Karavan" / "UFO" (1975)
- "Kolika je Jahorina planina"/ "Kovači sreće" (1975)
- "Kadija" / "Šta je rekla Ana" (1975)
- "Život je maskenbal" / "Našem putu kraja nema" (1976)
- "Štap" / "Nepoznata pjesma" (1976)
- "Igraj mala opa, opa" / "Otišla je ljubav moja" (1977)
- "Alaj mi je večeras po volji" / "Ja i ti i ljubav naša" (1977)

=== Solo ===
==== Compilation albums ====
- Gold Collection (2022)

==== Singles ====
- "Tetovirane duše" (1986)
