= Vojislav Simić =

Serbian musician and conductor (1924–2025)

Vojislav Simić Војислав Симић
- Also known as: Bubiša
- Born: 18 March 1924; Belgrade, Kingdom of Serbs, Croats and Slovenes (now Serbia)
- Died: 29 September 2025 (aged 101) Serbia
- Occupations: Musician; conductor; composer

Vojislav Simić (Serbian Cyrillic: Војислав Симић, 18 March 1924 – 29 September 2025), better known as "Bubiša", was a Serbian musician, conductor, composer and pioneer of Serbian ethno-jazz.

== Life and career ==
Simić was born on 18 March 1924, in Belgrade, Yugoslavia, and was well known as a conductor of Belgrade's Television Jazz Orchestra, the composer of numerous jazz compositions, traditional liturgical choral and orchestral music, ethno-jazz compositions as well as children's music.

From 1953 to 1985, Simić and his Belgrade's Television Jazz Orchestra performed throughout Europe, collecting numerous awards and winning numerous competitions, including the well-known Juan Le Pen Jazz Festival in France, where they won first prize in 1960.

Simić was also a guest conductor in numerous theatres in the former Yugoslavia and guest composer at children's festivals throughout Serbia, being influenced by Jovan Jovanović Zmaj, the Serbian writer and poet.

== Death ==
Simić died on 29 September 2025, at the age of 101.

== Sources ==
- Jakovljević, S. (2003): Jedan vek džeza & Kratki prilozi za izučavanje džeza u Srbiji, Knjižara Žagor, Beograd
- Simić, V. B. (2006): Veselo putovanje: sa džez orkestrom RTV Beograd po belom svetu, Radio-televizija Srbije, Beograd
