= Miladin Šobić =

Montenegrin singer and songwriter

- Born: 6 January 1956 (age 70); Nikšić, FPR Yugoslavia (now Montenegro)
- Genres: Blues, Rock
- Occupations: Singer, songwriter, poet
- Instrument: acoustic guitar
- Years active: 1975–1983
- Labels: Diskoton, PGP RTB

Miladin Šobić (Montenegrin: Миладин Шобић, born 7 January 1956) is a Montenegrin poet, singer and songwriter.

He was an active performer during the late 1970s and early 1980s in SFR Yugoslavia where his prominence had a regional character with popularity across Yugoslavia. His music is dominated by the sound of acoustic guitar, and has predominantly love and melancholic themes.

== Biography ==
He was born on 7 January 1956, in Nikšić where he graduated from high school. In high school, he had started writing lyrics and composing songs. After finishing high school, he moved to Dubrovnik in order to pursue studies at the College of Tourism.

While he was a college student, he created some of his best known songs. In 1975, Šobić released his first song "To sam ja" (That's me), which was, at that time, an unofficial anthem among the college students in Dubrovnik.

A year later at the Festival Omladina (Youth Festival) music festival in Subotica he won second place with the song Daj nam neba (Give Us Sky). In 1978, he won the best lyrics award for song Bolesno ljeto (Sick Summer) at the Belgrade Spring music festival. Cooperating with the pianist Gabor Lenđel and studio musicians, Šobić released two albums Ožiljak (The Scar) (Diskoton, 1981) and Umjesto gluposti (Instead of Stupidity) (Diskoton, 1982). He had also recorded a third album called Barutana Ljubavi (Powder-mill of Love), but after his sister's death he decided to leave music and the album was never released.

After that he returned to living in his home town, Nikšić, Montenegro and never went back to his musical career, in spite of frequent rumours of his comeback.

In 2002, Ibrica Jusić, his friend, announced his comeback. Until today, his new never-before released songs are being discovered, and the unaffirmed rumours about his comeback keep appearing sporadically.

He also made music for theater play "Marko Kraljević Super Star" directed by Slobodan Milatović.

On 30 January 2013, Šobić was admitted to hospital following a brain haemorrhage.

In 2016, Miladin Šobić was awarded the July 13th award, the highest Montenegro's national award.

Singer-songwriter Vanja Radovanović who represented Montenegro in the Eurovision Song Contest 2018 is Šobić's nephew.

== Discography ==
=== Singles ===
- "Zazvoni zvono" / "To sam ja" (1975)

=== Albums ===
- Ožiljak (1981)
- Umjesto gluposti (1982)

=== Other songs ===
- Železnička Tuga (Railroad sadness)
- Ašik Ajša / Ždrebica (Ashik Aisha / Mare)
- Bio sam jednom novembar (I was November Once)
- Bolesno ljeto (Sick Summer)
- Desetka iz drugarstva (A in Friendship)
- Dok zbori Tito (While Tito Speaks)
- Daj nam neba (Give Us Sky!)
- Izvini što te volim (Sorry for Loving You)
- Jutarnja kava (Morning Coffee)
- Kako da ti kažem to / Bez tebe (How to Tell You That / Without You)
- Keka
- Kišobran (Umbrella)
- Kriva si (You're Guilty)
- Mlada Jela (Young Jela)
- Moj djed / Kolibica (My Grandfather / Little Hut)
- Pjesma protiv rata / Od majmuna mi nijesmo (Song Against War / We Are not of Monkeys)
- Pjesma za kraj (Song for the End)
- Protiv svakog zla (Against Every Evil)
- Puste ceste (Deserted roads)
- Srednjoškolka (Highschool girl)
- Sutomore
- Svjetionik (Lighthouse)
- Žana (Jeanne)

== See also ==
- SFR Yugoslav Pop and Rock scene
