= Dženan Salković =

Bosnian singer-songwriter (1945–1989)

- Born: January 2, 1945; Konjic, Bosnia and Herzegovina
- Died: July 20, 1989 (aged 44) Split, Croatia

Dženan Salković (2 January 1945 – 20 July 1989), also known by the nickname Đani, was a Bosnian and Yugoslav singer, songwriter, and doctor from Mostar.

== Career ==
In 1969 he wrote the song "Hej, Hej" which was later covered in 1978 by rock band Drugi Način as "Prođe ovaj dan." In 1973 he wrote the song "Jefimija" for the group Lutajuća Srca, which won the Union of Composers of Yugoslavia Award that year. The song was inspired by the life of medieval Serbian poet Jefimija. At the time Salković was in a relationship with the lead singer of Lutajuća Srca, Spomenka Đokić. He dedicated the song to her.

In 2006 "Jefimija" was ranked No. 94 on the B92 Top 100 Domestic Songs list.

Salković enjoyed recreational flying. In July 1989 he had an accident while piloting a glider while flying near Glamočko Polje. He died on 20 July 1989.
