= Tutti Frutti (Croatian band) =

Croatian rock band

Tutti Frutti is a Croatian and former Yugoslav rock band formed in the mid-1980s. The band is best known for its hit songs "Nasloni glavu na moje rame", "Ne bojim se drugova tvoga frajera", "Stvari lagane" and "Dalmacijo", the latter being the anthem of the Croatian football club Hajduk Split and its supporters, celebrating the Dalmatia region. In 2010, the band recorded a new album named Pivo i tekila (Beer and tequila) and dissolved again.

== Band members ==
- Ivo Amulić - singer (formation - 1986–1991, 2009–2010)
- Marsell Benzon - singer (1991–1994)
- Alen Nižetić - singer (1994–1996)
- Ivo Jagnjić - lead guitar
- Zdravko Sunara - drums
- Nenad Ninčević - rhythm guitar
- Davor Pastuović - bass
- Miroslav Miše-Rovinjež - keyboards, piano

== Discography ==
- 1986 - Brzi vlak u nogama
- 1987 - Gore iznad oblaka
- 1988 - Stvari lagane
- 1989 - Krila leptira
- 1990 - Opusti se i uživaj
- 1992 - Vozio sam cijelu noć
- 1996 - Ruže i vino
- 1997 - Stvari lagane (compilation)
- 2007 - Zlatna kolekcija (compilation)
- 2010 - Pivo i tekila
