= Slave Dimitrov =

Macedonian musician (born 1946)

- Born: 1 June 1946 (age 80); Bitola, People's Republic of Macedonia, Democratic Federal Yugoslavia
- Origin: Republic of Macedonia
- Genre: Pop
- Occupations: Singer; record producer; composer
- Instrument: Piano
- Years active: 1966–present

Slave Dimitrov (Macedonian: Славе Димитров, born 1 June 1946) is a Macedonian composer, singer, and record producer.
