= Srđan Marjanović =

Serbian singer-songwriter from Belgrade (born 1952)

- Born: 1952 (age 73–74); Banja Luka, SR Bosnia and Herzegovina, FPR Yugoslavia
- Origin: Belgrade, Serbia
- Genres: Rock, acoustic rock, pop rock
- Occupations: Musician, songwriter, record producer
- Instruments: Guitar, vocals
- Years active: late 1960s – present
- Labels: PGP-RTB, Jugoton, Diskos, ZKP RTLJ, Diskoton, Jugodisk, City Records, Gold Music, PGP-RTS, Multimedia Records
- Website: srdjanmarjanovic.com

Srđan Marjanović (Serbian Cyrillic: Срђан Марјановић) is a Serbian singer-songwriter from Belgrade.

== Musical career ==
=== Early career ===
Marjanović was born in 1952 in Banja Luka. In 1961, he moved to Belgrade, where he became interested in rock music. He played guitar in the bands Svici (Fireflys), Usamljeni (The Lonely Ones) and Gru. In 1971, he travelled to Sweden, where he performed songs by Donovan and Bob Dylan, accompanying himself with a guitar and a harmonica.

=== 1972 and onwards ===
Marjanović returned to Belgrade in 1972, and soon became a part of the Belgrade acoustic rock scene. At the time he also performed in the musical Jesus Christ Superstar, played in Atelje 212, playing one of the priests.

In 1973, at the Festival Omladina, he won the Jury Award for the song "Tražim" ("I Am Searching"). During the same year, he appeared at the Zagreb Festival with the song "Prvi put sretni" ("Happy for the First Time"). In 1974, at the Opatija Festival, he performed the song "Ja te volim, ljubavi" ("I Love You, My Dear"). These songs were released on 7-inch singles, which Marjanović recorded with bass guitarist Dušan Ćućuz and drummer Mića Lolić "Žorž". After he ended the cooperation with the two, Marjanović recorded and played with the band SOS, with keyboardist Đorđe Petrović occasionally joining them. He often performed the opening act on YU Grupa concerts, and he performed as the opening act on Belgrade concert of the British band Soft Machine.

He recorded his first studio album, entitled Srđan Marjanović i prijatelji (Srđan Marjanović and Friends) in 1974, with the members of YU Grupa. The backing vocals on the album were sung by the members of the acoustic rock band Zajedno, among which was, at the time, Bora Đorđević. In the autumn of 1975, Marjanović and three other singer-songwriters, Drago Mlinarec, Ivica Percl and Tomaž Domicelj, held a month-long tour entitled Četvorica za mir (Four for Peace).

In 1978, Marjanović went to serve the army. After returning from the army, he formed his backing band, Puma, which featured Božidar Kazanić on bass guitar, Petar Jablanov on drums and Slobodan Milivojević on keyboards. For a short period of time, Ratislav Đelmaš and Luka Bošković were the band's drummers. On the 1979 two months-tour across Soviet Union Marjanović went with the band Nova Dimenzija (New Dimension).

During the summer of 1979, in Tetrapak Studio in Split, Marjanović recorded his second album, Kod mene imaš veliki plus (I Give You a Big Plus). The album featured Dušan Ćućuz (at the time a member of symphonic rock band Tako), drummer Steva Stevanović (a former SOS member) and keyboardist Dragan Miloradović. The album's hits were "Mi smo jedno drugom govorili vi" ("We used to say Vous to Each Other"), "Nije ti se htelo" ("You Had No Luck"), "Zaustavite muziku" ("Stop the Music") and a new version of the song "Idi" ("Go"), previously released on a 7-inch single.

Marjanović released his third album, Uvek ima neki đavo (There Is Always a Devil), in 1980 with Puma. The album was produced by Marjanović himself- It featured a new, harder version of his old song "Ne ostavljaj me sad" ("Don't Leave Me Now"). In 1981, Marjanović released his fourth studio album, Ne kači se za mene (Don't Stick With Me), and in 1982 his fifth studio album, Senti-Menti. Senti-Menti featured Halil Barjaktar on bass guitar, Aleksandar Stanojević on keyboards, Jovan Đukanović on drums, and members of the girl group Aska on backing vocals. In 1983, he released the album Ne pucaj na plavog anđela (Don't Shoot the Blue Angel). In 1984, he released the album Lopov! (Thief!), which featured Boban Birtašević on bass guitar, and which saw little publicity.

In 1986, he released new album, entitled Sam (Alone), as it was his first album recorded without Puma, and featuring mostly Ballads. The bass guitar was played by Branko Marinković (a former Kim member), drums and percussion by Ljubiša Stojanović "Louis", and the keyboards by Slobodan Milivojević. The Backing vocals were sung by Mira Baširević, and the album was produced by Marjanović and Rade Radivojević (who also wrote the music for one track). In 1989, he released the album Ako jednom puknem ja (If I Go into Pieces One Day), on which one side consisted of his songs, and the second of covers of ballads by Yugoslav artists: "Selma" (originally performed by Bijelo Dugme), "Ti samo budi dovoljno daleko" ("Just Remain Far Enough", originally performed by Generacija 5), "Zašto" ("Why", originally performed by Oliver Dragojević), and "Da li znaš da te volim" ("Do You Know that I Love You", originally performed by Time).

In 1994, Marjanović recorded the double album Priznaću sve (I'll Admit All). The album, recorded with former Tako guitarist Miroslav Dukić, featured five new songs and three old songs rerecorded. During the same year, his songs "Kad bih smeo, kad bi hetla" ("If I Dared, If You Would") and "Blues za usnu harmoniku" ("Blues for Harmonica") were released on Komuna compilation albums Sve smo mogli mi: Akustičarska muzika (We Could Have Done All: Acoustic Music) and Jednoj ženi: Instrumentalna muzika (To a Woman: Instrumental music) respectively. In 1998, the compilation album Nežno 1974. – 1998. (Gently 1974—1998) was released. The album featured a new version of "Mi smo jedno drugom govorili vi".

In 2001, he released the album Melanholik (Melancholic). Three years later, he released the album Jednoj jedinoj (To the One and Only). In 2010, he released the double album Poslednji album (The Last Album), first disc featuring ten new songs, and the second featuring eighteen old songs. The song "Ko te pita" ("Who Gives a Damn") is a duet with Tomaž Domicelj.

== Career as a producer ==
Beside producing his own albums (Kod mene imaš veliki plus, Uvek ima neki đavo, Ne kači se za mene, Senti-menti, Ne pucaj na plavog anđela, Lopov!, Sam, Priznaću sve, Melanholik, Jednoj jedinoj and Poslednji album), Marjanović has also produced Slomljena Stakla debut album, Psiho klub (Psycho Club, 1983), Balkan album Homobalacanicus (1985), Mirjana Beširević album Vrati se (Come Back, 1985), Nenad Radulović's only solo album, Niko nema što piton imade (Nobody Has what the Python Has, 1989) and Gerila album Kralj ulice (King of the Street, 1989).

== Other activities ==
Marjanović wrote about rock music for Zum reporter, ITD, Večernje novosti and Ćao. At the beginning of the 1990s, he was an editor of Ćao's discographic activity. In 1983, he opened the studio Cepelin and became a producer in the Belgrade branch of ZKP RTLJ record label.

== Discography ==
=== Studio albums ===
- Srđan Marjanović i prijatelji (1974)
- Imaš kod mene veliki plus (1980)
- Uvek ima neki đavo (1980)
- Ne kači se za mene (1981)
- Senti-Menti (1982)
- Ne pucaj na plavog anđela (1983)
- Lopov! (1984)
- Sam (1986)
- Ako jednom puknem ja (1989)
- Priznaću sve (1995)
- Melanholik (2001)
- Jednoj jedinoj (2004)

=== Compilations ===
- Nežno 1974. – 1998. (1998)
- Poslednji album (studio/compilation album; 2010)

=== Singles ===
- "Moja mala" / "Tražim" (1973)
- "Prvi put sretni" / "U čemu je stvar" (1973)
- "Dolaze mladi" / "Pustite me da sanjam" (1973)
- "Ja te volim ljubavi" / "Vau vau" (1974)
- "Pesma sreće" / "Idi" (1975)
- "Mala Maja" / "Leptir" (1976)
- "Tvoja mašina" / "Ne ostavljaj me sad" (1976)
- "Zeleni poljubac" / "Da li spavaš" (1978)
