= Jure Robežnik =

Slovenian pianist and composer (1933–2022)

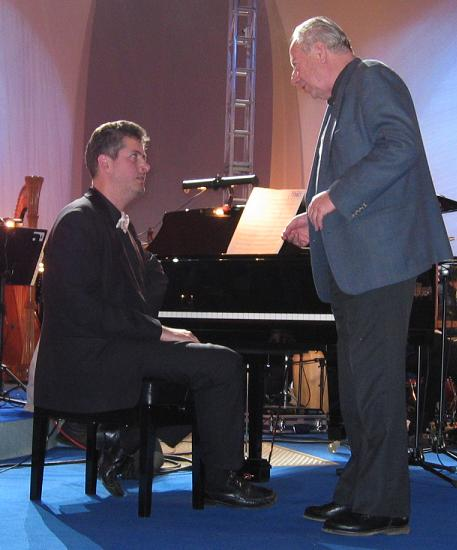
- Jure Robežnik (right) on his 70th birthday with pianist Blaž Jurjevčič (left)

Background information
- Born: 23 August 1933; Ljubljana, Yugoslavia
- Died: 7 October 2022 (aged 89)
- Genres: Jazz, popular music
- Instruments: Piano, vibraphone
- Years active: 1950s−2022
- Formerly of: Mojmir Sepe Band

Jure Robežnik (23 August 1933 – 7 October 2022) was a Slovenian pianist and composer; his focus was on jazz and popular music. Despite possessing no musical education, he authored over one hundred and fifty musical pieces.

Robežnik completed studies of German language in 1958 in Ljubljana. In 2017, he was bestowed with a Kozina Award by the Society of Slovenian Composers.

== List of pieces ==
- Pegasto dekle (A Freckled Girl; text by Elza Budau)
- Ptica vrh Triglava (A Bird Above Triglav; text by Dušan Velkaverh)
- Šel si mimo (You Went By; text by Elza Budau)
- Ti si moja ljubezen (You Are My Love; text by Elza Budau)
- Presenečenja (Surprises; text by Dušan Velkaverh)
- Maja z biseri (Maja With Pearls; text by Dušan Velkaverh)
- Mesto mladih (The City of Youth; text by Svetlana Makarovič)
- Mlade oči (Young Eyes; text by Dušan Velkaverh)
- Ljubljančanke (Girls of Ljubljana; text by Dušan Velkaverh)
- Tri korake v modro (Three Steps Into Blue; text by Elza Budau)
- Orion (Orion; text by Gregor Strniša)
- Človek, ki ga ni (The Human That Does Not Exist; text by Branko Šömen)
- Na deževen dan (On a Rainy Day; text by Elza Budau)
- Na vrhu nebotičnika (On Top of the Skyscraper; text by Gregor Strniša)
- Vrtiljak (Carousel; text by Gregor Strniša)
- Lastovka (Swallow Bird; text by Milan Jesih)
