= Kemal Monteno =

Bosnian singer-songwriter (1948–2015)

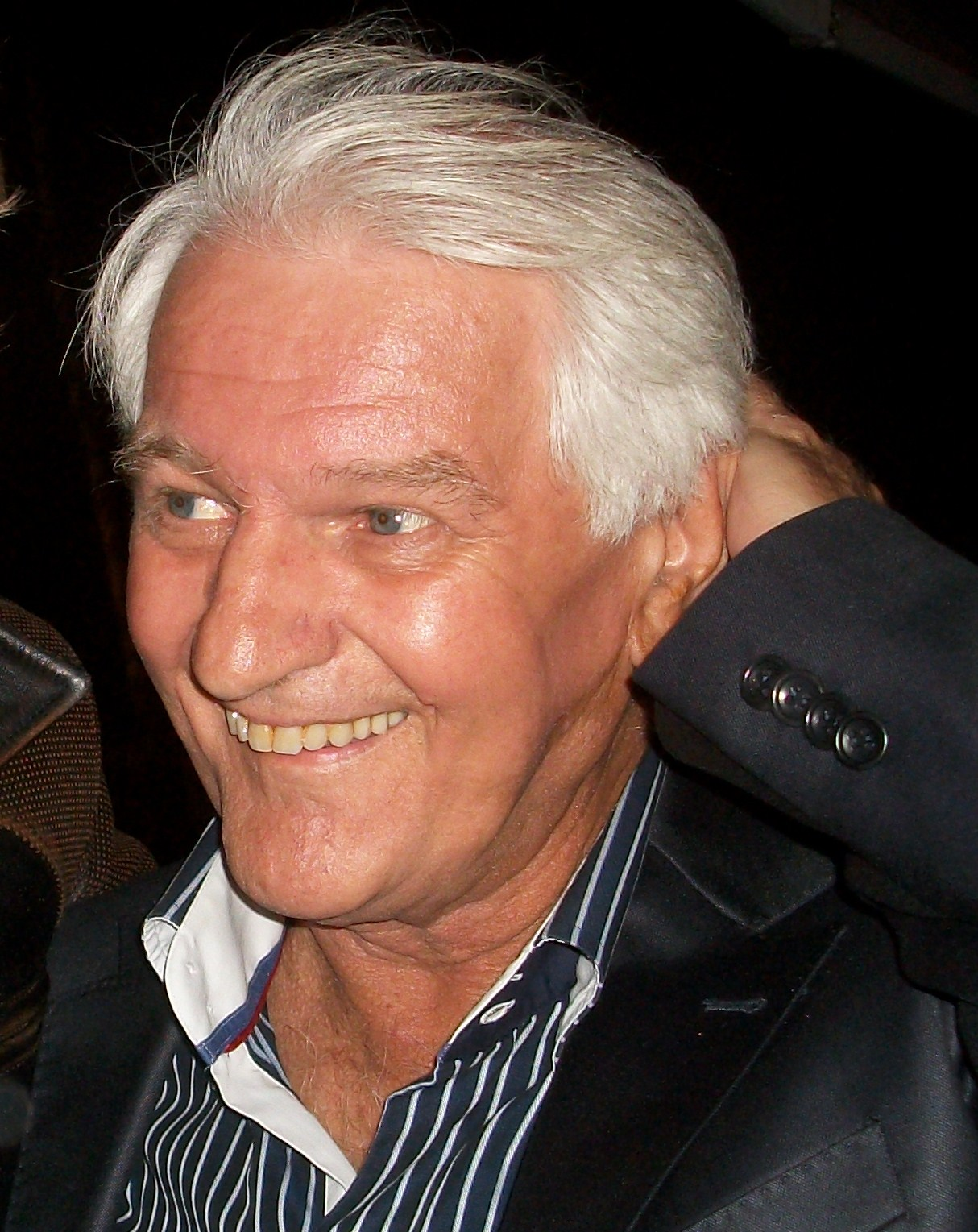
- Monteno in 2011
- Born: 17 September 1948; Sarajevo, PR Bosnia and Herzegovina, FPR Yugoslavia
- Died: 21 January 2015 (aged 66); Zagreb, Croatia
- Resting place: Bare Cemetery, Sarajevo
- Occupation: Singer-songwriter
- Spouse: Branka Monteno (m. 1971)
- Children: 2
- Musical career
- Genres: Folk, pop, sevdalinka
- Instruments: vocals, guitar
- Labels: Jugoton, Diskoton, Croatia Records, Nimfa Sound

Kemal Monteno (17 September 1948 – 21 January 2015) was a Bosnian recording artist and singer-songwriter whose career stretched from the 1960s to the 2010s. He is widely considered one of the greatest songwriters of the former Yugoslavia.

Monteno wrote songs for other performers as well, most notably Zdravko Čolić, Toše Proeski, and the rock band Indexi.

== Early life ==
Monteno's father Osvaldo was an Italian from Monfalcone. During World War II, he was drafted and deployed to occupied Yugoslavia in 1945 where he met a Bosniak woman named Bahrija in Sarajevo and fell in love. Osvaldo left his pregnant wife in Italy to marry Bahrija. Osvaldo's Italian wife gave birth in 1946 to a daughter named Daniela, Monteno's half-sister. Kemal was born to Osvaldo and Bahrija two years later in Sarajevo. Although his father was Catholic and his mother was a Muslim, Monteno was given a Muslim first name.

Osvaldo only spoke Italian and sang canzones to Monteno when he was a child, while his mother sang him Bosnian sevdalinkas. Both Osvaldo and Bahrija were employed at Sarajevo's Koševo Stadium.

== Career ==
Monteno recorded his first song "Lidija" in 1967 and enjoyed a prosperous career in Yugoslavia. He is perhaps best known for "Sarajevo, ljubavi moja", which gained a cult following and is considered an evergreen homage to his home town.

Many of his songs have also been performed by others. For instance, "Bacila je sve niz rijeku" was a hit not only for him, but for Toše Proeski, Crvena Jabuka and Indexi (the latter being the big hit). Similarly, others had success performing "Nekako s proljeća" (that one being a duet with Crvena Jabuka in 1991) and "Nije htjela". In a February 2014 interview, Monteno said that "Nije htjela" (She Did Not Want To) was written about a famous Yugoslav musician's wife, who was in love with another singer.

Over the years, due to his style of music, he became known as the "Bosnian Roy Orbison", and even the "Bosnian Neil Diamond."

== Personal life ==
Monteno met his future wife Branka in 1967 in Sarajevo. They married on 26 June 1971 when he returned from his mandatory stint in the Yugoslav People's Army. Together they had a daughter Adrijana and a son Đani. He spent the entirety of the 1990s war in Bosnia and Herzegovina in besieged Sarajevo.

== Illness and death ==
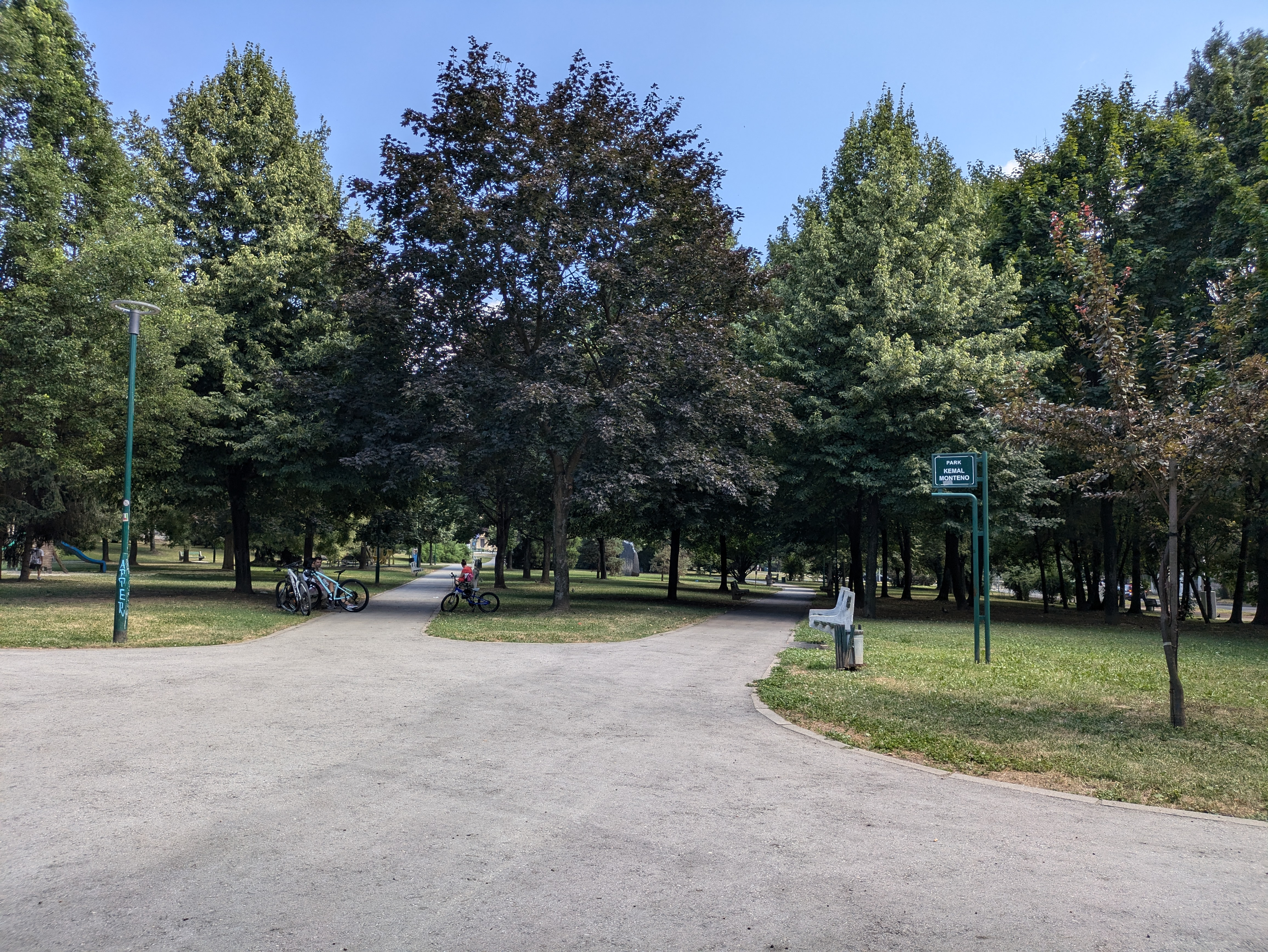
A park in central Sarajevo was named in Monteno's honour

Monteno was diagnosed with diabetes in the late 1990s and received three-hour dialysis twice a week at the University Hospital Centre Zagreb. Diabetes weakened his heart and Monteno felt that the stress of the war in his country also contributed to his illness.

Monteno suffered a heart attack on 30 December 2011 and had bypass surgery in January 2012. A performance at the 2012 Split Festival that summer was cancelled due to health issues and rumors of his death circled the internet on 10 October 2012, even being picked up as fact by media in the region.

On 15 November 2014, after nearly three years of waiting, Monteno received a phone call that a kidney was available for transplant. He received the transplant the following morning in Zagreb. He was again hospitalized in December 2014 and doctors believed that his "body did not accept the kidney that was transplanted in November."

Monteno died on January 21, 2015, at Zagreb Rebro Hospital of pneumonia and sepsis. In the hospital, doctors fought for Monteno's life for hours to no avail. He was buried in his hometown of Sarajevo at the Bare Cemetery on 28 January 2015, seven days after his death.

== Discography ==
=== Studio albums ===
- Muziko, ljubavi moja (1973)
- Žene, žene (1975)
- Moje pjesme, moji snovi (1977)
- Za svoju dušu (1980)
- Dolly Bell (1981)
- Uvijek ti se vraćam (1984)
- Moje najdraže pjesme (1985)
- Romantična ploča (1986)
- Kako da te zaboravim (1987)
- Dunje i kolači (2004)
- Samo malo ljubavi (2009)
- Šta je život (2013)

=== Singles and EPS ===
- Sviraj, gitaro moja / Još juče bili smo sretni (1969)
- Tužna je muzika / Pružam ti ruke (1971)
- Što sam ti skrivio, živote moj / Jedne noći u Decembru (1971)
- Laž (1972)
- Dušo moja / Nana (1973)
- Pahuljice moja (1974)
- Moj prijatelj ari / Mali mir (1974)
- Adrijana / Novembar (1974)
- Pjesma zaljubljenika / Znam sve o tebi (1975)
- Hiljade bijelih marama / Kad nas jednom godine odnesu (1976)
- Tajna žena / Kad smo pošli mi u šumu (1976)
- Sarajevo, ljubavi moja / Kratak je svaki tren (1976)
- Ljubavna bol (1977)
- Cvite bili iz Đardina / Nemoj reći doviđenja (1977)
- Volim te živote kakav jesi / Na kraju grada (1978)
- Sunce djetinjstva / Putovanja, putovanja (1978)
- Nije htjela / Nek' sviraju gitare (1978)
- Ej, srećo moja / Čekat ću te (1978)
- Adriana, Adriana / Bracera (1979)
- Postoji li mjesto / Ti si moja poezija (1979)
- Energoinvest (1982)

=== Compilation albums ===
- Volim te živote kakav jesi (1978)
- The Platinum Collection (2007)
- The Best Of... // Live (2012)
- 50 originalnih pjesama (2014)

Awards and achievements
Preceded by J-DA	Sunčane Skale winner with Teška industrija 2013	Succeeded by Dimitar Andonovski
