= Bisera Veletanlić =

Yugoslav Serbian jazz singer (born 1942)

Bisera Veletanlić (Serbian Cyrillic: Бисера Велетанлић, pronounced [bǐsɛra ʋɛlɛ̌taːnlit͡ɕ]; born 15 September 1942 in Sisak) is a serbian jazz singer, one of the greatest names of Yugoslav evergreen scene and the star of music festivals in the 1970s. She has been called "one of the most original singers from the Balkans".

== Discography ==
=== Singles ===
- Crveni cvet / Lutka sad si ti / Da li si usamljen noćas / U moje doba (-{Extended Play Single}-, 1964)
- Dečak taj / Ne želim takvu ljubav / -{Sunny}- / Volim ceo svet (-{Extended Play Single}-, 1967)
- Kad bi (Opatija, 1967)
- Dugo / Ne plači (1971)
- Ruku mi daj / Noć je duga (1973)
- Maglovit dan / Ne traži (1973)
- Milo moje / A ja te znam (1973)
- Među stvarima (-{Double Extended Play Single}-, 1974)
- Misli o tebi / Ručak za svoje (1974)
- Ti si obala ta / Ti nisi sam (1974)
- Volim te / Prozor (1974)
- Dođi, kad zima odlazi / Proletnji dan (1975)
- Šta ću, nano, dragi mi je ljut / Tužno popodne (1975)
- Ti si čovek moj / Još samo malo (1975)
- Dan ljubavi / Ostavi sve (prepev pesme -{Den ljubezni}- od grupe Pepel in kri. Sa Biserom pevaju još i Nada Knežević, Beti Đorđević i Boba Stefanović, 1975)
- Aha, aha / Budi dobar, i misli na mene (1976)
- Baj, baj, baj / 222805 (1976)

Awards and achievements
Preceded by Željko Samardžić	Pjesma Mediterana winner 1996	Succeeded by Extra Nena
