= Netherlands in the Eurovision Song Contest 1990 =

- Eurovision Song Contest 1990
- Participating broadcaster: Nederlandse Omroep Stichting (NOS)
- Country: Netherlands
- Selection process: Nationaal Songfestival 1990
- Selection date: 10 March 1990

Competing entry
- Song: "Ik wil alles met je delen"
- Artist: Maywood
- Songwriter: Alie de Vries

Placement
- Final result: 15th, 25 points

Participation chronology

The Netherlands was represented at the Eurovision Song Contest 1990 with the song "Ik wil alles met je delen", written by Alie de Vries, and performed by the duo Maywood. The Dutch participating broadcaster, Nederlandse Omroep Stichting (NOS), selected its entry for the contest through a national final.

== Before Eurovision ==
=== Nationaal Songfestival 1990 ===
==== Competing entries ====
Competing entries
Artist	Song	Composer(s)
Angelina van Dijk	"Later"	Coen Baes; Sietze Jansen
Aurora	"De mooiste dag"	Edward Reekers; Edwin Schimscheimer
Cha-Cha	"Oh wat een heerlijke tijd"	Elbert Kok
The Company	"Zonder liedje"	Marcel Schimscheimer; Ruud Sommer; Cees Stolk
Erik Mesie	"Liefde"	Fons Merkies; Cyriel van Kappel
Georgie Davis	"Eenmaal"	John Ewbank
Gina	"Liever alleen"	Maarten Peeters
Gordon	"Gini"	Peter van Asten; Karel Alberts
Harold Verwoerdt	"Blijf maar bij mij"	Maarten Peeters
Helen Carmine	"Morgen"	Kees Smit
Jeans	"Freedom, Freiheit, liberté"	Piet Souer
John Vis	"Ben je gek"	Edward Reekers
Jolanda de Wit	"Je bent het echt"	Clemens van Ven; Margriet de Graaf
Marc Benz	"Geef mij een kans"	Gertjan Hessing; Elmer Veerhoff; Aart Mol; Erwin van Prehn; Cees Bergman
Maywood	"Ik wil alles met je delen"	Alie May
Rose Glisten	"Niet zonder jou"	Maarten Peeters
Shan	"Anne"	Peter van Asten; Piet Souer
Shift	"Helemaal"	Herman Pieter de Boer; Hans van Eijk; Ronald Schilperoort
Simple and Pure	"Einde van de regentijd"	Peter de Wijn; Peter Schön
Tony Neef	"Alles"	Hans Vermeulen; Hans Jansen

==== Semi-finals ====
The first semi-final took place on 16 February 1990. Ten songs competed and five songs, chosen by an expert jury, qualified for the final.

Semi-final 1 – 16 February 1990
R/O	Artist	Song	Result
1	Cha-Cha	"Oh wat een heerlijke tijd"	Qualified
2	Rose Glisten	"Niet zonder jou"	—N/a
3	Gordon	"Gini"	Qualified
4	Maywood	"Ik wil alles met je delen"	Qualified
5	Angelina van Dijk	"Later"	—N/a
6	Shan	"Anne"	—N/a
7	Jeans	"Freedom, Freiheit, liberté"	Qualified
8	Harold Verwoerdt	"Blijf maar bij mij"	—N/a
9	Helen Carmine	"Morgen"	—N/a
10	Marc Benz	"Geef mij een kans"	Qualified

The second semi-final took place on 23 February 1990. Ten songs competed and five songs, chosen by an expert jury, qualified for the final.

Semi-final 2 – 23 February 1990
R/O	Artist	Song	Result
1	The Company	"Zonder liedje"	Qualified
2	Georgie Davis	"Eenmaal"	Qualified
3	Simple and Pure	"Einde van de regentijd"	Qualified
4	Jolanda de Wit	"Je bent het echt"	—N/a
5	Erik Mesie	"Liefde"	—N/a
6	Aurora	"De mooiste dag"	—N/a
7	John Vis	"Ben je gek"	—N/a
8	Gina	"Liever alleen"	Qualified
9	Tony Neef	"Alles"	—N/a
10	Shift	"Helemaal"	Qualified

==== Final ====
The final took place on 10 March 1990 at the Congresgebouw in The Hague, hosted by Paula Patricio. Ten songs competed, and the winner was chosen by juries in the twelve Dutch provinces, who awarded 10 points to their favourite song down to 1 point to the least-liked. Maywood won by a 7-point margin, having been ranked first by four of the juries, two more than any other competing song.

Final – 10 March 1990
R/O	Artist	Song	Points	Place
1	The Company	"Zonder liedje"	95	2
2	Cha-Cha	"Oh wat een heerlijke tijd"	46	8
3	Gordon	"Gini"	45	9
4	Simple and Pure	"Einde van de regentijd"	60	6
5	Georgie Davis	"Eenmaal"	44	10
6	Jeans	"Freedom, Freiheit, liberté"	64	5
7	Gina	"Liever alleen"	56	7
8	Marc Benz	"Geef mij een kans"	69	4
9	Maywood	"Ik wil alles met je delen"	102	1
10	Shift	"Helemaal"	79	3

Detailed Regional Jury Votes
R/O	Song	Drenthe	Overijssel	Zeeland	Utrecht	Limburg	South Holland	North Holland	North Brabant	Friesland	Flevoland	Groningen	Gelderland	Total
1	"Zonder liedje"	7	8	8	9	9	9	10	6	10	8	4	7	95
2	"Oh wat een heerlijke tijd"	1	3	6	5	8	1	2	4	3	6	1	6	46
3	"Gini"	5	1	4	3	3	5	1	3	2	10	5	3	45
4	"Einde van de regentijd"	6	7	3	7	7	3	6	5	6	5	3	2	60
5	"Eenmaal"	3	6	5	2	1	8	4	1	1	1	7	5	44
6	"Freedom, Freiheit, liberté"	9	4	1	10	4	2	5	7	8	2	8	4	64
7	"Liever alleen"	8	9	9	1	2	4	3	2	4	4	9	1	56
8	"Geef mij een kans"	2	2	2	4	10	10	7	8	5	9	2	8	69
9	"Ik wil alles met je delen"	10	10	7	8	6	7	9	9	9	7	10	10	102
10	"Helemaal"	4	5	10	6	5	6	8	10	7	3	6	9	79

== At Eurovision ==
On the night of the final Maywood performed 5th in the running order, following Turkey and preceding Luxembourg. At the close of voting "Ik wil alles met je delen" had received 25 points from 10 countries, placing the Netherlands 15th of the 22 entries. The Dutch jury awarded its 12 points to France.

The Dutch conductor at the contest was Harry van Hoof.

The contest was broadcast on Nederland 3, with commentary by Willem van Beusekom.

=== Voting ===
Points awarded to the Netherlands
Score	Country
12 points	
10 points	
8 points	
7 points	
6 points	France
5 points	
4 points	United Kingdom
3 points	Switzerland; Turkey
2 points	Cyprus; Israel; Italy
1 point	Greece; Luxembourg; Portugal

Points awarded by the Netherlands
Score	Country
12 points	France
10 points	Ireland
8 points	Italy
7 points	Belgium
6 points	Sweden
5 points	Greece
4 points	Israel
3 points	Turkey
2 points	Spain
1 point	Austria
