= Germany in the Eurovision Song Contest 1990 =

- Eurovision Song Contest 1990
- Participating broadcaster: ARD (Note: Arbeitsgemeinschaft der öffentlich-rechtlichen Rundfunkanstalten der Bundesrepublik Deutschland) – Bayerischer Rundfunk (BR)
- Country: Germany
- Selection process: Ein Lied für Zagreb
- Selection date: 29 March 1990

Competing entry
- Song: "Frei zu leben"
- Artist: Chris Kempers and Daniel Kovac
- Songwriters: Ralph Siegel; Michael Kunze

Placement
- Final result: 9th, 60 points

Participation chronology

Germany was represented at the Eurovision Song Contest 1990 with the song "Frei zu leben", composed by Ralph Siegel, with lyrics by Michael Kunze, and performed by Chris Kempers and Daniel Kovac. The German participating broadcaster on behalf of ARD, Bayerischer Rundfunk (BR), selected their entry through a national final.

== Before Eurovision ==
=== Ein Lied für Zagreb ===
The final took place on 29 March 1990 at the German Theatre in Munich and was hosted by Hape Kerkeling. Ten acts presented their entries live and the winner was selected by public televoting.

Final – 29 March 1990
R/O	Artist	Song	Songwriter(s)	Televote	Place
1	Isabel Varell	"Melodie d'amour"	Drafi Deutscher; Anna Rubach	3,867	6
2	Chris Kempers and Daniel Kovac	"Frei zu leben"	Ralph Siegel; Michael Kunze	11,955	1
3	Jürgen Drews	"Alpenglühn"	Hanne Haller; Bernd Meinunger	1,267	9
4	Mara Laurien	"Wetten, dass..."	Joachim Heider; Roland Kaiser; Friedhelm Lehmann	2,601	7
5	Bandit	"Alles was ich haben will"	Clemens Werner	4,064	5
6	Divo	"Melissa"	Mino Siciliano; Michele Centoza; Deborah Sasson	6,004	4
7	Xanadu	"Paloma Blue"	Tony Hendrik; Karin van Haaren; Anna Rubach	8,534	2
8	Kennzeichen D	"Wieder zusamm"	Erich Virch; Diether Dehm; Martin Engelien	2,454	8
9	Malibu	"Eine Nacht voll Zärtlichkeit"	Uwe Busse; Karlheinz Rupprich	1,180	10
10	Starlight	"Hollywood ist besser als Latein"	Günther Behrle	6,723	3

== At Eurovision ==
"Frei zu leben" was performed thirteenth on the night, following Switzerland and preceding France. At the close of voting, it had received 60 points, placing 9th of 22 countries competing.

The contest was broadcast on Erstes Deutsches Fernsehen (with commentary by Fritz Egner) and on SSVC Television. The show was watched by 7.02 million viewers in Germany.

=== Voting ===
Points awarded to Germany
Score	Country
12 points	Luxembourg
10 points	Ireland
8 points	Spain
7 points	United Kingdom
6 points	Belgium
5 points	Italy
4 points	Denmark; Sweden
3 points	Austria
2 points	
1 point	Iceland

Points awarded by Germany
Score	Country
12 points	Spain
10 points	France
8 points	Belgium
7 points	Ireland
6 points	Italy
5 points	Turkey
4 points	Israel
3 points	Luxembourg
2 points	Sweden
1 point	United Kingdom
