= Iceland in the Eurovision Song Contest 1990 =

- Eurovision Song Contest 1990
- Participating broadcaster: Ríkisútvarpið (RÚV)
- Country: Iceland
- Selection process: Söngvakeppni Sjónvarpsins 1990
- Selection date: 10 February 1990

Competing entry
- Song: "Eitt lag enn"
- Artist: Stjórnin
- Songwriters: Hörður G. Ólafsson; Aðalsteinn Ásberg Sigurðsson

Placement
- Final result: 4th, 124 points

Participation chronology

Iceland was represented at the Eurovision Song Contest 1990 with the song "Eitt lag enn", composed by Hörður G. Ólafsson, with lyrics by Aðalsteinn Ásberg Sigurðsson, and performed by Stjórnin. The Icelandic participating broadcaster, Ríkisútvarpið (RÚV), selected its entry through Söngvakeppni Sjónvarpsins 1990.

== Before Eurovision ==
=== Söngvakeppni Sjónvarpsins 1990 ===
Ríkisútvarpið (RÚV) organised the fifth edition of Söngvakeppni Sjónvarpsins in order to select its entry for the Eurovision Song Contest 1990.

==== Semi-finals ====
The first semi-final took place on 27 January 1990 and six of the competing acts performed. The top three entries, decided by a jury of 60 people in the studio audience, advanced to the final.

Semi-final 1 – 27 January 1990
R/O	Artist	Song	Points	Place	Result
1	Eyjólfur Kristjánsson	"Austur eða vestur"	36	4	—N/a
2	Ari Jónsson	"Mánaskin"	30	6	—N/a
3	Sigríður Beinteinsdóttir and Grétar Örvarsson	"Eitt lag enn"	118	1	Qualified
4	Ingi Gunnar Jóhansson	"Dagdraumar"	36	4	—N/a
5	Eyjólfur Kristjánsson	"Ég er að leita þín"	47	3	Qualified
6	Björgvin Halldórsson	"Sú ást er heit"	93	2	Qualified

The second semi-final took place on 3 February 1990 and six of the competing acts performed. The top three entries, decided by a jury of 60 people in the studio audience, advanced to the final.

Semi-final 2 – 3 February 1990
R/O	Artist	Song	Points	Place	Result
1	Ellen Kristjánsdóttir	"Ég læt mig dreyma"	82	2	Qualified
2	Helga Möller	"Eitt lítið lag"	69	3	Qualified
3	Bergþóra Árnadóttir	"Gott er að lifa"	24	6	—N/a
4	Björgvin Halldórsson	"Til þín"	92	1	Qualified
5	Ruth Reginalds	"Eilífur dagur"	28	5	—N/a
6	Sigríður Beinteinsdóttir and Grétar Örvarsson	"Ef ekki er til nein ást"	65	4	—N/a

==== Final ====
The final was held on 10 February 1990 at the RÚV studios in Reykjavík, hosted by Edda Andrésdóttir. 6 songs competed, with the winner being selected by the votes of nine juries - eight regional juries and a final professional jury.

Final – 10 February 1990
R/O	Artist	Song	Points	Place
1	Björgvin Halldórsson	"Sú ást er heit"	58	4
2	Sigríður Beinteinsdóttir and Grétar Örvarsson	"Eitt lag enn"	129	1
3	Helga Möller	"Eitt lítið lag"	67	2
4	Ellen Kristjánsdóttir	"Ég læt mig dreyma"	32	5
5	Björgvin Halldórsson	"Til þín"	60	3
6	Eyjólfur Kristjánsson	"Ég er að leita þín"	11	6

Detailed Jury Votes
R/O	Song	West	Westfjords	Northwest	Northeast	East	South	Reykjanes	Reykjavík	Professionals	Total
1	"Sú ást er heit"	8	8	4	11	2	9	11	5		58
2	"Eitt lag enn"	17	18	19	14	20	11	14	16		129
3	"Eitt lítið lag"	10	9	11	7	8	13	5	4		67
4	"Ég læt mig dreyma"	2	4	1	1	8	4	3	9		80
5	"Til þín"	4	3	6	8		4	7	7	21	60
6	"Ég er að leita þín"	1		1	1	4	1	2	1		11

== At Eurovision ==
Beinteinsdóttir and Örvarsson, now as Stjórnin, performed 8th on the night of the contest, held in Zagreb, Yugoslavia, following the United Kingdom and preceding Norway. They received 124 points for her performance of "Eitt lag enn", placing 4th of 22 competing countries, which was Iceland's best result in Eurovision until 1999.

=== Voting ===
Points awarded to Iceland
Score	Country
12 points	Portugal; United Kingdom
10 points	Austria; Belgium; Denmark; Norway
8 points	Israel; Luxembourg; Sweden
7 points	Finland; Ireland; Switzerland
6 points	
5 points	
4 points	Spain; Yugoslavia
3 points	Greece; Italy
2 points	
1 point	Turkey

Points awarded by Iceland
Score	Country
12 points	France
10 points	Yugoslavia
8 points	Ireland
7 points	Denmark
6 points	Austria
5 points	Finland
4 points	Spain
3 points	Italy
2 points	Turkey
1 point	Germany
