= Somewhere in Europe =

Somewhere in Europe may refer to:

- Somewhere in Europe (film), Hungarian film
- Somewhere in Europe (song), song by Liam Reilly that represented Ireland in the Eurovision Song Contest 1990
