= United Kingdom in the Eurovision Song Contest 1990 =

- Eurovision Song Contest 1990
- Participating broadcaster: British Broadcasting Corporation (BBC)
- Country: United Kingdom
- Selection process: A Song for Europe 1990
- Selection date: 30 March 1990

Competing entry
- Song: "Give a Little Love Back to the World"
- Artist: Emma
- Songwriter: Paul Curtis

Placement
- Final result: 6th, 87 points

Participation chronology

The United Kingdom was represented at the Eurovision Song Contest 1990 with the song "Give a Little Love Back to the World", written by Paul Curtis, and performed by Emma. The British participating broadcaster, the British Broadcasting Corporation (BBC), selected its entry through a national final.

== Before Eurovision ==
=== A Song for Europe 1990 ===
The eight songs in contention to represent the United Kingdom were presented during Terry Wogan's Wogan chat show on BBC1. Two songs were presented during each of four broadcasts between 21 and 28 March. The songs were also featured in various programmes on BBC Radio 2.

A separate results show was broadcast on BBC1 the same evening. BBC Radio 2 simulcast the final and also broadcast the results show, both with commentary by Ken Bruce.

==== Final ====
The BBC held the 1990 edition of A Song for Europe on 30 March at Studio 1 of the BBC Television Centre in London. The BBC Concert Orchestra under the direction of Alyn Ainsworth as conductor accompanied all the songs, but despite performing live, the orchestra were off-screen, behind the set. Terry Wogan presided over the eight finalists and a panel of celebrities was assembled to comment on each of the entries. The panel was composed of Gloria Hunniford, Tim Rice, Cathy McGowan, and Carl Davis.

As in the last two years, a national telephone vote decided the outcome of the contest. Emma won with a runaway phone poll of 97,625 calls over John Miles, who polled 38,966.

A Song for Europe 1990 – 30 March 1990
R/O	Artist	Song	Songwriter(s)	Televote	Place
1	Kelly	"Better Be Good to Me"	John Springate	13,179	6
2	Stephen Lee Garden	"That Old Feeling Again"	Mike Moran	14,447	5
3	Thom Hardwell	"Never Give Up"	Thom Hardwell	3,540	8
4	Emma	"Give a Little Love Back to the World"	Paul Curtis	97,625	1
5	Les McKeown	"Ball And Chain"	John Griggs	15,171	4
6	Simon Spiro	"Face In The Crowd"	David Reilly	5,551	7
7	Kim Goody	"Sentimental Again"	Mo Foster; Kim Goody	17,986	3
8	John Miles	"Where I Belong"	John Miles; Michael Scanlon-Pratt	38,966	2

== At Eurovision ==
The contest was broadcast on BBC1 and BBC TV Europe with commentary by Terry Wogan, and on BBC Radio 2, with commentary by Ken Bruce. It was also shown on SSVC Television for British Army troops stationed in Germany.

The final was held in Zagreb, Yugoslavia on 5 May. Emma was supported by several backing singers including Miriam Stockley (later a backing vocalist for Katrina and the Waves in 1997) and Sam Blue (who competed against Katrina and the Waves in the 1997 national final). "Give a Little Love Back to the World" placed sixth place with 87 points.

=== Voting ===
Points awarded to the United Kingdom
Score	Country
12 points	Belgium
10 points	France; Israel; Switzerland; Yugoslavia
8 points	
7 points	Spain
6 points	Ireland; Italy
5 points	Greece
4 points	
3 points	Cyprus; Denmark; Luxembourg
2 points	
1 point	Austria; Germany

Points awarded by the United Kingdom
Score	Country
12 points	Iceland
10 points	Ireland
8 points	Austria
7 points	Germany
6 points	Sweden
5 points	Yugoslavia
4 points	Netherlands
3 points	Luxembourg
2 points	Portugal
1 point	Spain
