= Finland in the Eurovision Song Contest 1990 =

- Eurovision Song Contest 1990
- Participating broadcaster: Yleisradio (Yle)
- Country: Finland
- Selection process: National final
- Selection date: 17 February 1990

Competing entry
- Song: "Fri?"
- Artist: Beat
- Songwriters: Kim Engblom; Tina Krause; Janne Engblom; Stina Engblom

Placement
- Final result: 21st, 8 points

Participation chronology

Finland was represented at the Eurovision Song Contest 1990 with the song "Fri?", composed by Kim Engblom, Tina Krause, and Janne Engblom, with lyrics by Stina Engblom, and performed by the band Beat. The Finnish participating broadcaster, Yleisradio (Yle), selected its entry through a national final.

This was the first time that the Finnish entry had been sung in Swedish at the Eurovision Song Contest. After that the only other time Finland has entered the contest with a song in Swedish was in 2012 with "När jag blundar" performed by Pernilla Karlsson.

== Before Eurovision ==
=== National final ===
Eleven entries were selected for the competition from 225 submissions received during a submission period as well as from ten composers and music publishers directly invited by Yleisradio (Yle). The national final was held on 17 February 1990 at the Kulttuuritalo in Helsinki, hosted by Kati Bergman. The winner was chosen by an expert jury. Each juror distributed their points between 1–8 and 10 for each song, and 12 for the best song. This would be Ossi Runne's last participation as a conductor for the pre-selections in 24 years. He would hand over his baton to his successor, Olli Ahvenlahti, as he would conduct at Zagreb.

In addition to the performances of the competing entries, the show was opened by Barbarella performing "(Like a) Fata Morgana". Later, as an interval act, Barbarella performed "Sucker for Your Love".

Final – 17 February 1990
R/O	Artist	Song	Songwriter(s)	Points	Place
1	Robinson and Apollo 16	"Yön poika"	Esa Mäkelä; Veijo Mäki; Kai Stenman; Sami Piiparinen; VeePee Lehto	60	6
2	Susanne Sonntag	"Jag tror på friheten"	Thomas Katter; Henrik Svahn	92	2
3	Tarja Lunnas	"Naurus sun ja katseesi sun"	Markku Anttila; Jorma Toiviainen	74	5
4	Anita Pajunen	"Satujen mies"	Mick Hanian; Juha Louhivuori	32	10
5	Arja Saijonmaa	"Gabriela"	Petri Laaksonen; Turkka Mali	89	3
6	Leena Pirhonen	"Sua haluan"	Leena-Liisa Krasko	48	8
7	Marjorie	"Tuuli"	Eeva Kiviharju	59	7
8	Beat	"Fri?"	Kim Engblom; Janne Engblom; Tina Krause; Stina Engblom	95	1
9	Jussi Halme	"Katsot yötä tummaa"	Jussi Halme; Laila Halme	38	9
10	Jone	"Jälkees sun"	Jone Ullakko	24	11
11	Tomas Ek	"Du går så skyggt"	Curre Boucht; Åke Grandell	75	4

Detailed Jury Votes
R/O	Song	Marja Aarnipuro	Timo Vitikka	Hanna Pesonen	Aarno Cronvall	Helena Miller	Virve Valli	Leena Kurikka	Jarmo Moilanen	Arto Vilkko	Olli Heikkilä	Juha Tapaninen	Total
1	"Yön poika"	7	7	6	6	4	4	6	3	5	5	7	60
2	"Jag tror på friheten"	12	8	5	12	12	10	2	8	7	10	6	92
3	"Naurus sun ja katseesi sun"	6	5	8	6	4	7	7	12	6	8	5	74
4	"Satujen mies"	2	3	2	4	2	2	2	3	5	5	2	32
5	"Gabriela"	10	6	10	5	10	8	6	4	10	8	12	89
6	"Sua haluan"	4	2	8	4	1	4	5	1	7	6	6	48
7	"Tuuli"	6	4	3	8	5	7	10	3	4	7	2	59
8	"Fri?"	8	12	12	10	3	12	12	2	8	12	4	95
9	"Katsot yötä tummaa"	2	3	2	6	6	4	3	2	3	5	2	38
10	"Jälkees sun"	1	1	2	4	3	1	2	1	1	4	4	24
11	"Du går så skyggt"	5	6	4	8	10	3	8	3	12	8	8	75

== At Eurovision ==
Beat performed last of 22, following Cyprus. Beat was accompanied by Kari Kuivalainen and Robin Wikman as backing vocalists. The performance's choreography was made by Thomas Ingman. At the close of the voting they had received 8 points, placing joint last with Norway.

=== Voting ===
Points awarded to Finland
Score	Country
12 points	
10 points	
8 points	
7 points	
6 points	
5 points	Iceland
4 points	
3 points	Israel
2 points	
1 point	

Points awarded by Finland
Score	Country
12 points	France
10 points	Spain
8 points	Italy
7 points	Iceland
6 points	Cyprus
5 points	Israel
4 points	Ireland
3 points	Switzerland
2 points	Austria
1 point	Yugoslavia
