= Spain in the Eurovision Song Contest 1990 =

- Eurovision Song Contest 1990
- Participating broadcaster: Televisión Española (TVE)
- Country: Spain
- Selection process: Internal selection
- Announcement date: Artist: 9 March 1990; Song: 5 April 1990

Competing entry
- Song: "Bandido"
- Artist: Azúcar Moreno
- Songwriters: Raúl Orellana; Jaime Stinus; José Luis Abel

Placement
- Final result: 5th, 96 points

Participation chronology

Spain was represented at the Eurovision Song Contest 1990 with the song "Bandido", composed by Raúl Orellana and Jaime Stinus, with lyrics by José Luis Abel, and performed by the duo Azúcar Moreno. The Spanish participating broadcaster, Televisión Española (TVE), internally selected its entry for the contest. The song, performed in position 1, placed fifth out of twenty-two competing entries with 96 points.

== Before Eurovision ==
Televisión Española (TVE) internally selected "Bandido" performed by Azúcar Moreno as its entry for the Eurovision Song Contest 1990. The song was composed by Raúl Orellana and Jaime Stinus, and had lyrics by José Luis Abel. The members of the duo were sisters Antonia and Encarnación Salazar –Toñi and Encarna–. The name of the song, the songwriters, and performers were announced on 9 March 1990. (Note: The title of the song was initially announced as "Gitano bandido.") TVE presented the song along the promo video that was distributed to the other participant broadcasters on 5 April. This music video, in which the duo performs the song in a television studio, features images of paintings by Velázquez.

== At Eurovision ==
On 5 May 1990, the Eurovision Song Contest was held at the Vatroslav Lisinski Concert Hall in Zagreb hosted by Radiotelevizija Zagreb on behalf of Jugoslavenska radiotelevizija (JRT), and broadcast live throughout the continent. Azúcar Moreno performed "Bandido" first on the evening, preceding Greece. Eduardo Leiva conducted the event's orchestra performance of the Spanish entry. At the close of the voting "Bandido" had received 96 points, placing 5th in a field of 22.

A notorious mishap occurred at the start of the Spanish performance. Eduardo Leiva was unable to hear the backing track where some of the music was prerecorded, as the sound engineers had failed to raise the volume of the tape, and could not cue the orchestra to commence on time. When the volume was eventually raised the track was already partway through the song, meaning the orchestra and performers were out of sync with the tape, resulting in the two singers abruptly walking offstage in a huff, leaving viewers to wonder what had happened. After a few uneasy moments, the music began correctly and the song was performed in full. The duo also had problems with the clothing they were going to wear. Because the costumes designed especially for the performance by Francis Montesinos broke during rehearsals, they had to wear their own dresses bought at El Rastro flea market.

TVE broadcast the contest in Spain on TVE 2 with commentary by Luis Cobos. Before the event, TVE aired a talk show hosted by Vicky Larraz introducing the Spanish jury, which continued after the contest commenting on the results.

=== Voting ===
TVE assembled a jury panel with sixteen members. The following members comprised the Spanish jury:

- Amparo Mendiguren García – housewife
- Pedro Calleja Martín – clerk
- Paloma Gómez Núñez – actress
- José Ramón Gamo – student
- Teresa del Río – actress
- Emilio de Villota – racing driver
- Fiorella Faltoyano – actress
- Julián Lago – director of Tribuna magazine
- Raquel Revuelta – Miss Spain 1990
- Juan Carlos Arteche – football player
- Conchita de los Santos – journalist
- Alfredo Roldán – civil servant
- Margarita Girón – public relations
- José Sanjuán – chemist
- María José Olmedilla – lawyer
- Javier Morera – lawyer

The jury was chaired by Miguel Blasco, Head of Broadcasting at TVE. The jury awarded its maximum of 12 points to Italy.

Points awarded to Spain
Score	Country
12 points	Germany
10 points	Finland; Turkey
8 points	Austria; Cyprus; Greece; Italy
7 points	
6 points	Switzerland
5 points	France; Norway; Portugal
4 points	Iceland
3 points	Yugoslavia
2 points	Netherlands
1 point	Belgium; United Kingdom

Points awarded by Spain
Score	Country
12 points	Italy
10 points	Ireland
8 points	Germany
7 points	United Kingdom
6 points	Denmark
5 points	France
4 points	Iceland
3 points	Yugoslavia
2 points	Sweden
1 point	Switzerland
