= Turkey in the Eurovision Song Contest 1990 =

- Eurovision Song Contest 1990
- Participating broadcaster: Turkish Radio and Television Corporation (TRT)
- Country: Turkey
- Selection process: 14. Eurovision Şarkı Yarışması Türkiye Finali
- Selection date: 24 February 1990

Competing entry
- Song: "Gözlerinin Hapsindeyim"
- Artist: Kayahan
- Songwriter: Kayahan Açar

Placement
- Final result: 17th, 21 points

Participation chronology

Turkey was represented at the Eurovision Song Contest 1990 with the song "Gözlerinin Hapsindeyim", written and performed by Kayahan Açar. The Turkish participating broadcaster, the Turkish Radio and Television Corporation (TRT), selected its entry through a national final.

== Before Eurovision ==
=== 14. Eurovision Şarkı Yarışması Türkiye Finali ===
The Turkish Radio and Television Corporation (TRT) held the national final on 24 February 1990 at the Ari TV studios in Ankara, hosted by Korhan Abay. Fifteen songs competed and the winner was determined by the votes of eight regional juries. This contest was the only contest where everything was played entirely live. Despite the instruments shown on stage, they were all required to play live. The three previous editions (1987, 1988, 1989) allowed playback as long as there was an instrument present on stage.

The national final version of the song "Gözlerinin Hapsindeyim" is different from the version performed at the Eurovision Song Contest. According to Eroğlu, the TRT had a special budget ready when they decided they wanted their song to be improved. They hired Jean Claudric to rearrange the song. However, due to limited time, only some parts were made. Eroğlu used Jean's version and made an orchestration out of it for the contest. Most of the members in Kayahan's band preferred Eroğlu's old arrangement.

Final – 24 February 1990
R/O	Artist	Song	Lyricist	Composer	Conductor	Points	Place
1	Sonat Bağcan & Seda Bağcan	"Bir Perdelik Aşk"	Savaş Bağcan	Can Atilla	Can Atilla	23	8
2	İzel Çeliköz	"Selam Yabancı"	Fikret Şeneş	Selçuk Başar	Selçuk Başar	2	15
3	Sibel Tüzün	"Kime Ne?"	Zeynep Talu	Levent Çoker	Levent Çoker	16	9
4	Sevingül Bahadır	"Her Şey Müzik"	Aysel Gürel	Garo Mafyan	Garo Mafyan	6	14
5	Sertab Erener	"Sen Benimlesin"	Aysel Gürel	Uğur Başar	Uğur Başar	44	6
6	Oya Küçümen	"Serseri Aşık"	Bora Ebeoğlu	Turhan Yükseler	Turhan Yükseler	28	7
7	Tülay Saygın	"Zamanda Gezinti"	Nezih Topuzlu	Selmi Andak	Turhan Yükseler	12	10
8	Özlem Yüksek, Ufuk Yıldırım & Kurtalan Ekspres	"Sensiz Olamam"	Meltem Taşkıran	Ercan Saatçi	Garo Mafyan	7	13
9	Kayahan	"Gözlerinin Hapsindeyim"	Kayahan Açar		Ümit Eroğlu	86	1
10	Grup Piramit	"Bilinmeyen Bir Yerlerde"	Feyyaz Kuruş		Garo Mafyan	9	12
11	Ultraviyole	"Komedi"	İlhan İrem		Aykut Gürel	56	3
12	Cenk Sökmen	"Yıldız Beyazı"	Firüzan Eroğlu	Ümit Eroğlu	Ümit Eroğlu	11	11
13	Rüya Ersavcı, Can Uğurluer & Gülgün Yıldız	"Hep O Şarkıları Söyle"	Can Uğurluer	Şevket Uğurluer	Osman İşmen	62	2
14	Cihan Okan & Candan Erçetin	"Daha Kolay"	İlhan İrem	Melih Kibar	Melih Kibar	55	4
15	Fatih Erkoç	"Özledim"	Fatih Erkoç		Turhan Yükseler	47	5

Detailed Regional Jury Votes
R/O	Song	Ankara	Istanbul	İzmir	Antalya	Mersin	Diyarbakır	Trabzon	Erzurum	Total
1	"Bir Perdelik Aşk"	3	1	1	5	5			8	23
2	"Selam Yabancı"	2								2
3	"Kime Ne?"			4	4		5		3	16
4	"Her Şey Müzik"				2	2	2			6
5	"Sen Benimlesin"	6	10	6		8	6	6	2	44
6	"Serseri Aşık"	4	4	5	1	3	4	2	5	28
7	"Zamanda Gezinti"			2	6		1	3		12
8	"Sensiz Olamam"						3	4		7
9	"Gözlerinin Hapsindeyim"	12	7	12	12	7	12	12	12	86
10	"Bilinmeyen Bir Yerlerde"	1	3			1			4	9
11	"Komedi"		12	10	7	10		7	10	56
12	"Yıldız Beyazı"	7	2					1	1	11
13	"Hep O Şarkıları Söyle"	5	5	8	10	12	8	8	6	62
14	"Daha Kolay"	8	6	7	8	4	10	5	7	55
15	"Özledim"	10	8	3	3	6	7	10		47

== At Eurovision ==
On the night of the contest Kayahan performed 4th in the running order following Belgium and preceding The Netherlands. At the close of the voting the song had received 21 points placing Turkey 17th. 5 participants had voted for "Gözlerinin hapsindeyim". The Turkish jury awarded its 12 points to Yugoslavia.

The members of the Turkish jury included Murat Türkoğlu, Selda Güneş, Mithat Kaya, Özlem Şen, Sıla Yavuz, Nazif Eke, Hülya Okçay, Kadir Gökdemir, Aydan Özbey, Özlem Çelik, Ziya Fırat Doğançay, Meltem Altınörs, Nihal Müftüoğlu, Zeki Tatlıgil, Ahmet Hüseyin Uluçay, and Mustafa Sarıkoç.

=== Voting ===
Points awarded to Turkey
Score	Country
12 points	
10 points	
8 points	
7 points	Yugoslavia
6 points	
5 points	Germany
4 points	Norway
3 points	Netherlands
2 points	Iceland
1 point	

Points awarded by Turkey
Score	Country
12 points	Yugoslavia
10 points	Spain
8 points	Italy
7 points	Austria
6 points	Switzerland
5 points	Ireland
4 points	France
3 points	Netherlands
2 points	Denmark
1 point	Iceland
