= Denmark in the Eurovision Song Contest 1990 =

- Eurovision Song Contest 1990
- Participating broadcaster: Danmarks Radio (DR)
- Country: Denmark
- Selection process: Dansk Melodi Grand Prix 1990
- Selection date: 24 March 1990

Competing entry
- Song: "Hallo Hallo"
- Artist: Lonnie Devantier
- Songwriters: John Hatting; Torben Lendager; Keld Heick

Placement
- Final result: 8th, 64 points

Participation chronology

Denmark was represented at the Eurovision Song Contest 1990 with the song "Hallo Hallo", composed by John Hatting and Torben Lendager, with lyrics by Keld Heick, and performed by Lonnie Devantier. The Danish participating broadcaster, Danmarks Radio (DR), organised the Dansk Melodi Grand Prix 1990 in order to select its entry for the contest.

== Before Eurovision ==
=== Dansk Melodi Grand Prix 1990 ===
Danmarks Radio (DR) held the Dansk Melodi Grand Prix 1990 on 24 March at the Tivoli Concert Hall in Copenhagen, hosted by two former Danish Eurovision representatives, Birthe Kjær (1989) and Dario Campeotto (1961). Ten songs took part with the winner being decided by two rounds of televoting. In the first round the bottom five songs were eliminated, then the remaining five were voted on again to give the winner. Other participants included three-time Danish representative Kirsten Siggaard (of Hot Eyes) and Jørgen Olsen, the Eurovision 2000 winner.

First Round – 24 March 1990
R/O	Artist	Song	Songwriter(s)	Result
1	Kirsten Siggaard	"Inden længe"	Jon Lundager; Mette Nybo	—N/a
2	Vocal Crew	"Hva' er det du vil"	Jesper Malmose; Morten Wedendahl	—N/a
3	Lecia Jønsson	"Krig og fred"	Lecia Sundstrøm Jønsson	—N/a
4	Lonnie Devantier	"Hallo Hallo"	John Hatting; Torben Lendager; Keld Heick	Advanced
5	Jørgen Olsen	"Berlin"	Wolfgang Käfer; Jørgen Olsen	Advanced
6	Helle Guldbech	"Det var en drøm"	Jan Glæsel; Klaus Kjellerup	—N/a
7	Käte and Per	"Kender du typen"	Per Damgaard; Hilda Heick; Keld Heick	Advanced
8	Aviaja Lumholt	"Fordi jeg elsker dig"	Kim Helweg; Morten Nilsson	—N/a
9	Birgitte Gade	"Ræk mig din hånd"	George Keller; Jens P. Meiner	Advanced
10	The Boys	"Du er min musik"	Jens Peter Clausen; Kim Jacobsen; Klaus Phanareth	Advanced

Second Round – 24 March 1990
R/O	Artist	Song	Televote	Place
1	Lonnie Devantier	"Hallo Hallo"	68,628	1
2	Jørgen Olsen	"Berlin"	25,676	3
3	Käte and Per	"Kender du typen"	14,153	5
4	Birgitte Gade	"Ræk mig din hånd"	51,414	2
5	The Boys	"Du er min musik"	15,904	4

== At Eurovision ==
On the night of the final Devantier performed 11th in the running order, following Israel and preceding Switzerland. The song was very much in the same uptempo pop vein which had characterised Danish Eurovision entries throughout the 1980s. At the close of voting "Hallo Hallo" had received 64 points from 13 countries, placing Denmark 8th of the 22 entries, the country's fifth consecutive top 10 finish. The Danish jury awarded its 12 points to Switzerland.

The contest was broadcast on DR TV (with commentary by Jørgen de Mylius) and on radio station DR P3 (with commentary by Karlo Staunskær and Kurt Helge Andersen).

=== Voting ===
Points awarded to Denmark
Score	Country
12 points	
10 points	
8 points	
7 points	Iceland; Israel; Italy; Norway; Portugal
6 points	Austria; Spain
5 points	
4 points	Cyprus; Ireland
3 points	Belgium; Sweden
2 points	Turkey
1 point	Switzerland

Points awarded by Denmark
Score	Country
12 points	Switzerland
10 points	Iceland
8 points	Ireland
7 points	Yugoslavia
6 points	Italy
5 points	France
4 points	Germany
3 points	United Kingdom
2 points	Cyprus
1 point	Norway
