= Cyprus in the Eurovision Song Contest 1990 =

- Eurovision Song Contest 1990
- Participating broadcaster: Cyprus Broadcasting Corporation (CyBC)
- Country: Cyprus
- Selection process: National final
- Selection date: 13 March 1990

Competing entry
- Song: "Milas poli"
- Artist: Anastasiou
- Songwriters: Haris Anastasiou; John Vickers

Placement
- Final result: 14th, 36 points

Participation chronology

Cyprus was represented at the Eurovision Song Contest 1990 with the song "Milas poli", composed by John Vickers, with lyrics by Haris Anastasiou, and performed by Anastasiou himself. The Cypriot participating broadcaster, the Cyprus Broadcasting Corporation (CyBC), selected its entry through a national final.

== Before Eurovision ==
=== Diagonismós Tragoudioú Giourovízion 1990 ===
==== Competing entries ====
The Cyprus Broadcasting Corporation (CyBC) opened a submission period for Cypriot artists and composers to submit songs until 20 January 1990. By the end of the submission period, over 85 entries had been submitted. On 15 February 1990, in radio room 1 at CyBC, a 17-member jury panel listened to the songs and selected the competing entries. The selection was done in three stages: first the songs were listened to and the invalid entries were taken out of the contest; then the jury voted and selected 20 entries; and from those 20 entries, the ten competing entries for the national final were selected.

Competing entries
R/O	Artist	Song	Songwriter(s)
7	Loukas Chamatsos and Maria Siakalli	"Ti nychta afti" (Τη νύχτα αυτή)	Maria Siakalli
18	Evridiki	"Ta logia pou mou les" (Τα λόγια που μου λες)	Giorgos Theofanous; Leonidas Malenis
30	Kaiti Chartosia	"Mono esy" (Μόνο εσύ)	Marios Oikonomidis
31	Kaiti Chartosia and Nikos Logothetis	"San mia mousiki" (Σαν μια μουσική)	Marios Oikonomidis; Giorgos Xinaris
37	Alex Panagi	"Pistevo" (Πιστεύω)	Andreas Giorgallis; Alex Panagi
54	Haris Anastasiou	"Chronia Polla" (Χρόνια Πολλά)	John Vickers; Soula Christou Orfanidou
55	Haris Anastasiou	"Milas poli" (Μιλάς πολύ)	Haris Anastasiou; John Vickers
56	Haris Anastasiou	"Kante me star" (Κάντε με σταρ)	Haris Anastasiou
57	Kristis Fantaios	"Gia sena asteri mou" (Για σένα αστέρι μου)	Kristis Fantaios
85	Yiannis Dimitriou	"Synantithikame" (Συνάντηθήκαμε)	Aristos Moschovakis; Yiannis Dimitriou

Competing entry selection jury members
- Christodoulos Achilleudis^{‡} – music inspector for Middle Education
- Sempou Apkarian^{‡} – music teacher, composer, and conductor
- Yiannis Bravos^{‡} – music director of SMEF (National Guard Military Band)
- Themis Christodolou^{‡} – musician and former head of CyBC music department
- Lygia Constantinidou^{‡} – head of CyBC music department
- Paula Fenech^{‡} – writer and radio operator
- Giorgos Kotsonis^{‡} – composer and deputy head of CyBC music department
- Aris Lemesos – choir master
- Tasos Michaelidis^{‡} – disc jockey
- Marinos Mitellas^{‡} – music teacher
- Dimitris Pavanis^{‡} – foreign music programme officer at CyBC
- Mike Sarridis^{‡} – disc jockey and CyBC partner
- Giorgos Siecherlis^{‡} – disc jockey and CyBC partner
- Leandros Sitaros – choir master
- Maro Skordi^{‡} – music teacher
- Michalis Stavridis^{‡} – music inspector for Primary Education
- Alex Zografou – musician and conductor

==== Final ====
The final was broadcast live at 21:00 (EET) on RIK on 13 March 1990 in a show called Diagonismós Tragoudioú Giourovízion 1990 (Greek: Διαγωνισμός Τραγουδιού Γιουροβίζιον 1990). The final was held in the Convention Centre in Nicosia, and was hosted by Stavros Louras. The results were decided by a 23-member jury, consisting of 14 of the jurors who chose the competing entries (indicated above with a dagger; ‡) plus 9 random members of the audience. Each jury member awarded songs in the same way as in the Eurovision Song Contest: from 12 to 1.

Final - 13 March 1990
R/O	Artist	Song	Conductor	Points	Place
1	Loukas Chamatsos and Maria Siakalli	"Ti nychta afti" (Τη νύχτα αυτή)	Doros Georgiadis	77	10
2	Haris Anastasiou	"Kante me star" (Κάντε με σταρ)	Doros Georgiadis	148	3
3	Haris Anastasiou	"Chronia Polla" (Χρόνια Πολλά)	Doros Georgiadis	113	8
4	Kaiti Chartosia	"Mono esy" (Μόνο εσύ)	Zan Pol Seisy	145	5
5	Yiannis Dimitriou	"Synantithikame" (Συνάντηθήκαμε)	Thomas Strase	116	7
6	Kaiti Chartosia and Nikos Logothetis	"San mia mousiki" (Σαν μια μουσική)	Doros Georgiadis	108	9
7	Kristis Fantaios	"Gia sena asteri mou" (Για σένα αστέρι μου)	Doros Georgiadis	135	6
8	Haris Anastasiou	"Milas poli" (Μιλάς πολύ)	Kristian Leibl	178	1
9	Evridiki	"Ta logia pou mou les" (Τα λόγια που μου λες)		166	2
10	Alex Panagi	"Pistevo" (Πιστεύω)	Andreas Giorgallis	148	3

== At Eurovision ==
On the night of the final, Haris Anastasiou - performing mononymously as Anastasiou - performed 21st in the running order, following Austria and preceding Finland. At the close of voting "Milas poli" had received 36 points, placing Cyprus 14th out of 22 countries. The Cypriot jury awarded its 12 points to Italy.

The contest was broadcast on RIK, with commentary by Neofytos Taliotis.

=== Voting ===
Points awarded to Cyprus
Score	Country
12 points	
10 points	
8 points	
7 points	
6 points	Finland; Greece; Sweden
5 points	Belgium; Israel
4 points	Italy
3 points	
2 points	Denmark; Norway
1 point	

Points awarded by Cyprus
Score	Country
12 points	Italy
10 points	Yugoslavia
8 points	Spain
7 points	France
6 points	Greece
5 points	Luxembourg
4 points	Denmark
3 points	United Kingdom
2 points	Netherlands
1 point	Switzerland
