= Yugoslavia in the Eurovision Song Contest 1990 =

- Eurovision Song Contest 1990
- Participating broadcaster: Jugoslavenska radiotelevizija (JRT)
- Country: Yugoslavia
- Selection process: Jugovizija 1990
- Selection date: 3 March 1990

Competing entry
- Song: "Hajde da ludujemo"
- Artist: Tajči
- Songwriters: Zrinko Tutić; Alka Vuica

Placement
- Final result: 7th, 81 points

Participation chronology

Yugoslavia was represented at the Eurovision Song Contest 1990 with the song "Hajde da ludujemo" (Хајде да лудујемо), composed by Zrinko Tutić, with lyrics by Alka Vuica, and performed by Tajči. The Yugoslav participating broadcaster, Jugoslavenska radiotelevizija (JRT), selected its entry through Jugovizija 1990. In addition, Radiotelevizija Zagreb (RTV Zagreb), on behalf of JRT, was the host broadcaster and staged the event at the Vatroslav Lisinski Concert Hall in Zagreb, after their win at the previous edition with the song "Rock Me" by Riva.

During a documentary series, titled Zauvijek autori, Vuica revealed the song was originally going to be called "Hajde da beremo jagode".

== Before Eurovision ==
=== Jugovizija 1990 ===
The Yugoslav national final to select their entry, Jugovizija 1990, was held on 3 March 1990 in Zadar, SR Croatia, and was hosted by Ana Brbora Hum and Branko Uvodić.

Sixteen songs made it to the national final, which was broadcast by the JRT affiliates to all of the regions of Yugoslavia. The winner was decided by the votes of eight regional juries (Sarajevo, Zagreb, Skopje, Titograd, Belgrade, Ljubljana, Priština, and Novi Sad). The winning entry was "Hajde da ludujemo", one of the entries submitted on behalf of TV Zagreb and performed by Croatian singer Tajči.

Final – 3 March 1990
R/O	Broadcaster	Artist	Song	Conductor	Points	Place
1	RTV Skopje	Intervali	"Kako magija"	Alan Bjelinski	13	12
2	RTV Pristina	Armend Rexhepagiqi	"Mami mami"	Alan Bjelinski	24	6
3	RTV Belgrade	Viktorija	"Rat i mir"	Slobodan Marković	27	5
4	RTV Zagreb	Massimo Savić	"Pjesma za tebe"	Stipica Kalogjera	21	8
5	RTV Zagreb	Tajči	"Hajde da ludujemo"	N/A	114	1
6	RTV Belgrade	Amsterdam	"Đavolica"	Slobodan Marković	0	15
7	RTV Sarajevo	Narcis Vučina and Arnela Konaković	"Sitna kiša padala"	Esad Arnautalić	20	9
8	RTV Belgrade	BG Sound	"Ti i ja"	Slobodan Marković	31	4
9	RTV Ljubljana	Pop Design	"Hasta la vista"	Alan Bjelinski	18	10
10	RTV Skopje	Top-Expres	"Baby"	Alan Bjelinski	22	7
11	RTV Sarajevo	Toni Janković	"Novi ples"	Esad Arnautalić	2	14
12	RTV Novi Sad	Boris Novković and Noćna straža	"Dajana"	Stipica Kalogjera	61	2
13	RTV Zagreb	Oliver Dragojević and Zorica Kondža	"Sreća je tamo gdje si ti"	Stipica Kalogjera	58	3
14	RTV Titograd	Foto-Model	"Tvoja oka dva"	Radovan Papović	3	13
15	RTV Ljubljana	Urša	"Crazy Baby"	Alan Bjelinski	0	15
16	RTV Ljubljana	Helena Blagne and Abrakadabra	"Ti in jaz, jaz in ti"	Alan Bjelinski	18	10

Entries submitted by broadcaster whose jury members were voting

Detailed Regional Jury Votes
R/O	Song	RTV Skopje			RTV Priština			RTV Beograd			RTV Zagreb			RTV Sarajevo			RTV Ljubljana			RTV Novi Sad			RTV Titograd			Total
R/O	Song	Ljubomir Branđolica	Suzana Stefanovska	Meto Jovanovski	Mustafë Halili	Sonja Spasić	Valton Beqiri	Rade Radivojević	Đorđe Marjanović	Branislav Karaulić	Josip Klima	Ksenija Pajić	Miljenko Prohaska	Dino Dervišhalidović	Brano Likić	Zdravko Radulović	Bojan Adamič	Dragan Bulič	Mirjam Korbar	Branislav Krstić	Siniša Mihajlović	Josip Lorbek	Marko Klepić	Vasilisa Radojević	Dejan Perišić	Total
1	"Kako magija"	3															2		5						3	13
2	"Mami mami"			2	7	3	5										7									24
3	"Rat i mir"							2		3				2	3	1		2	2	5	3		2		2	27
4	"Pjesma za tebe"	2	3	1							5		5						1		1	3				21
5	"Hajde da ludujemo"	7	7	7	3	2		3	5	5	3	1		7	2	7	5	7	7	7	7	7	7	3	5	114
6	"Đavolica"																									0
7	"Sitna kiša padala"								1		7		1	1	5	2				2		1				20
8	"Ti i ja"			3	1			7	7	7		2	2								2					31
9	"Hasta la vista"				5	1	7											5								18
10	"Baby"	1	2	5				5	3	2	1	3														22
11	"Novi ples"																							2		2
12	"Dajana"		1			7	1			1				5	7	3	1	3	3	3	5	2	5	7	7	61
13	"Sreća je tamo gdje si ti"	5	5		2	5	3	1	2		2	5	7	3		5						5	3	5		58
14	"Tvoja oka dva"																			1				1	1	3
15	"Crazy Baby"																									0
16	"Ti in jaz, jaz in ti"						2					7	3		1		3	1					1			18

=== Eurosong 90 ===
Prior to the contest, RTV Zagreb produced several shows called Eurosong 90, which aired on the common second channel of the Yugoslav broadcasters, in the lead-up to the contest.

== At Eurovision ==
On the night of the contest Yugoslavia performed 15th in the running order, following France and preceding Portugal. At the close of voting, "Hajde da ludujemo" had picked up 81 points, placing Yugoslavia in 7th place out of 22 entries. The Yugoslav jury awarded its 12 points to runner-up France.

The contest was broadcast on TV Beograd 1, TV Novi Sad, TV Ljubljana 1 and TV Zagreb 1. It was also broadcast on radio stations Radio Beograd 1, Val 202 and Radio Zagreb 1.

=== Voting ===
Points awarded to Yugoslavia
Score	Country
12 points	Israel; Turkey
10 points	Cyprus; Iceland; Italy
8 points	
7 points	Denmark
6 points	
5 points	Ireland; United Kingdom
4 points	
3 points	Norway; Spain
2 points	France
1 point	Finland; Sweden

Points awarded by Yugoslavia
Score	Country
12 points	France
10 points	United Kingdom
8 points	Austria
7 points	Turkey
6 points	Italy
5 points	Switzerland
4 points	Iceland
3 points	Spain
2 points	Luxembourg
1 point	Israel
