= Switzerland in the Eurovision Song Contest 1990 =

- Eurovision Song Contest 1990
- Participating broadcaster: Swiss Broadcasting Corporation (SRG SSR)
- Country: Switzerland
- Selection process: Concorso Eurovisione della Canzone: Finale Svizzera
- Selection date: 24 February 1990

Competing entry
- Song: "Musik klingt in die welt hinaus"
- Artist: Egon Egemann
- Songwriter: Cornelia Lackner

Placement
- Final result: 11th, 51 points

Participation chronology

Switzerland was represented at the Eurovision Song Contest 1990 with the song "Musik klingt in die welt hinaus", written by Cornelia Lackner, and performed by Egon Egemann. The Swiss participating broadcaster, the Swiss Broadcasting Corporation (SRG SSR), selected its entry through a national final.

== Before Eurovision ==
=== Regional selections ===
The Swiss Broadcasting Corporation (SRG SSR) held a national final to select its entry for the Eurovision Song Contest 1990. Each division of SRG SSR — Swiss German and Romansh broadcaster Schweizer Fernsehen der deutschen und rätoromanischen Schweiz (SF DRS), Swiss French broadcaster Télévision suisse romande (TSR), and Swiss Italian broadcaster Televisione Svizzera di lingua italiana (TSI) — used its own method to select its entries for the final. Eligible songs were required to have been composed by songwriters from Switzerland or Liechtenstein.

It is unknown how the regional broadcasters selected their songs, but 136 total songs were submitted (with 11 being invalid), of which eight were selected: three each in French and Italian, and two in German.

=== Concorso Eurovisione della Canzone: Finale Svizzera ===
TSI staged the national final on 24 February 1990 at 20:20 CET at the Palazzo dei Congressi in Lugano. It was hosted by Emanuela Gaggini. The national final was broadcast on TSI, TV DRS (with commentary by Beat Antenen), and TSR (with commentary by Serge Moisson). Lys Assia, who won Eurovision for Switzerland in 1956 and also represented the country in 1957 and 1958; Furbaz, who represented Switzerland in 1989; and Les Frères Taquins made guest appearances.

Among the participants were Sylvie, who would later represent France in 1999 as Nayah, and Sandra Simó, who would later represent Switzerland in 1991.

Participating entries
Broadcaster	Artist(s)	Song	Songwriter(s)		Language
Broadcaster	Artist(s)	Song	Composer(s)	Lyricist(s)	Language
RTSI	Nando Morandi	"Canta con noi"	Nando Morandi		Italian
RTSI	Sandra Simó	"Lo so"	Renato Mascetti		Italian
RTSI	Nadia Goj	"Una donna che cresce"	Marco Crivelli		Italian
SF DRS	Egon Egemann	"Musik klingt in die welt hinaus"	Cornelia Lackner		German
SF DRS	Simone & Simon	"Träume müssen stark sein"	Marlies Baumann; Simon Anderhub	Simon Anderhub	German
TSR	Adela	"J'irai oú tu voudras"	Enrico Brogini; Jean-Pierre Schenk		French
TSR	Sylvie & Joel	"Dites à vos enfants"	Pierre Collet	Philippe Malignon	French
TSR	Gemo	"Ailleurs c'est pareil"	Tobias Frey	Marco Schiess	French

The voting consisted of regional public votes which were sent to the three divisions of SRG SSR (SF DRS, TSR, TSI: German-Romansh, French, and Italian speaking, respectively), a press jury, and a jury of music experts. The winner was the song "Musik klingt in die welt hinaus", composed by Cornelia Lackner and performed by Egon Egemann.

Participating entries
R/O	Artist(s)	Song	Regional Juries			Press Jury	Expert Jury	Total	Place
R/O	Artist(s)	Song	DRS	TSR	TSI	Press Jury	Expert Jury	Total	Place
1	Nando Morandi	"Canta con noi"	5	4	6	8	6	29	4
2	Adela	"J'irai oú tu voudras"	2	1	2	3	3	11	7
3	Egon Egemann	"Musik klingt in die welt hinaus"	10	10	10	6	2	38	1
4	Sylvie & Joel	"Dites à vos enfants"	4	8	5	10	8	35	2
5	Sandra Simó	"Lo so"	1	2	1	1	5	10	8
6	Simone & Simon	"Träume müssen stark sein"	3	6	4	4	4	21	5
7	Gemo	"Ailleurs c'est pareil"	8	3	3	2	1	17	6
8	Nadia Goj	"Una donna che cresce"	6	5	8	5	10	34	3

== At Eurovision ==
At the Eurovision Song Contest 1990, held at the Vatroslav Lisinski Concert Hall in Zagreb, the Swiss entry was the eighteenth entry of the night following Denmark and preceding Germany. The Swiss conductor at the contest was Bela Balint. At the close of voting, Switzerland had received 51 points in total; finishing in eleventh out of twenty-two countries.

=== Voting ===
Each participating broadcaster assembled a jury panel with at least eleven members. The jurors awarded 1-8, 10, and 12 points to their top ten songs.

Points awarded to Switzerland
Score	Country
12 points	Denmark; Greece
10 points	
8 points	Portugal
7 points	
6 points	Turkey
5 points	Yugoslavia
4 points	
3 points	Finland
2 points	Luxembourg
1 point	Cyprus; France; Spain

Points awarded by Switzerland
Score	Country
12 points	France
10 points	United Kingdom
8 points	Italy
7 points	Iceland
6 points	Spain
5 points	Ireland
4 points	Belgium
3 points	Netherlands
2 points	Israel
1 point	Denmark
