= Greece in the Eurovision Song Contest 1990 =

- Eurovision Song Contest 1990
- Participating broadcaster: Hellenic Broadcasting Corporation (ERT)
- Country: Greece
- Selection process: National final
- Selection date: 23 March 1990

Competing entry
- Song: "Horis skopo"
- Artist: Christos Callow
- Songwriters: Yiorgos Palaiokastritis; Yiorgos Papayiannakis

Placement
- Final result: 19th, 11 points

Participation chronology

Greece was represented at the Eurovision Song Contest 1990 with the song "Horis skopo", composed by Yiorgos Palaiokastritis, with lyrics by Yiorgos Papayiannakis, and performed by Christos Callow. The Greek participating broadcaster, the Hellenic Broadcasting Corporation (ERT), selected its entry through a national final.

== Before Eurovision ==
=== National final ===
The Hellenic Broadcasting Corporation (ERT) held the national on 23 March 1990 at its television studios in Athens, hosted by Olina Xenopoulou. The songs were presented as video clips and the winning song was chosen by a panel of experts.

Final – 23 March 1990
R/O	Singer	Song	Place
1	Jimmy Makulis	"Mia nihta san ki apopse"	5
2	Aggeliki Bazigou	"Ora chi"	6
3	Louisa Konne	"Mono esi boreis"	4
4	Yiannis Dimitras	"Taxidi"	3
5	Christos Callow and Wave	"Horis skopo"	1
6	Nikos Ignatidis and Mando	"Mono emeis i dio"	2

== At Eurovision ==
"Horis skopo" was performed second on the night (following Spain's "Bandido" by Azúcar Moreno and preceding Belgium's "Macédomienne" by Philippe Lafontaine). At the close of voting, it had received 11 points, placing 19th in a field of 22. Up to this point, this was the worst result for Greece in the contest, and remained as so until 1998.

=== Voting ===
Points awarded to Greece
Score	Country
12 points	
10 points	
8 points	
7 points	
6 points	Cyprus
5 points	Netherlands
4 points	
3 points	
2 points	
1 point	

Points awarded by Greece
Score	Country
12 points	Switzerland
10 points	Italy
8 points	Spain
7 points	Ireland
6 points	Cyprus
5 points	United Kingdom
4 points	Luxembourg
3 points	Iceland
2 points	Sweden
1 point	Netherlands
