= Norway in the Eurovision Song Contest 1990 =

- Eurovision Song Contest 1990
- Participating broadcaster: Norsk rikskringkasting (NRK)
- Country: Norway
- Selection process: Melodi Grand Prix 1990
- Selection date: 24 March 1990

Competing entry
- Song: "Brandenburger Tor"
- Artist: Ketil Stokkan
- Songwriter: Ketil Stokkan

Placement
- Final result: 21st, 8 points

Participation chronology

Norway was represented at the Eurovision Song Contest 1990 with the song "Brandenburger Tor", written and performed by Ketil Stokkan. The Norwegian participating broadcaster, Norsk rikskringkasting (NRK), selected its entry through the Melodi Grand Prix 1990. Stokkan had previously represented Norway in 1986.

== Before Eurovision ==
=== Melodi Grand Prix 1990 ===
Norsk rikskringkasting (NRK) held the Melodi Grand Prix 1990 at the Hotel Royal Christiania in Oslo, hosted by Leif Erik Forberg. Ten songs took part with the winner chosen by voting from regional juries, a jury of music experts, and a press jury. In the first round of voting the bottom five songs were eliminated, then the remaining five were voted on again to give the winner. Other participants included three-time Norwegian representative and MGP regular Jahn Teigen and Tor Endresen, who would represent Norway in 1997.

Final – 24 March 1990
R/O	Artist	Song	Songwriter(s)	Points	Place	Result
1	Ketil Stokkan	"Brandenburger Tor"	Ketil Stokkan	7	1	Advanced
2	Stein Hauge and Twilight	"Sarah"	Are Selheim	6	4	Advanced
3	Kai Kiil	"Caballero"	Kai Kiil; Sverri Dahl	1	7	—N/a
4	Bente Lind	"Ciao amore"	Nick Borgen	1	7	—N/a
5	Damer og Herrer	"Østenfor sol"	Svein Gundersen; Stig Nilsson	2	6	—N/a
6	Magne Høyland	"Faren over"	Bård Svendsen; Bjarne Bårdstu	1	7	—N/a
7	Liv Ingund Nygaard	"En dag vil friheten seire"	Liv Ingund Nygaard	3	5	Advanced
8	Rune Rudberg	"Varme overalt"	Nick Borgen; Rune Rudberg	0	10	—N/a
9	Jahn Teigen	"Smil"	Nora Buraas; Ove Borøchstein	7	1	Advanced
10	Tor Endresen	"Café le swing"	Robert Morley; Eva Jansen; Finn Jansen	7	1	Advanced

Superfinal – 24 March 1990
R/O	Artist	Song	Expert/ Press Juries		Regional Juries					Total	Place
R/O	Artist	Song	Jury 1	Jury 2	Southern Norway	Western Norway	Eastern Norway	Central Norway	Northern Norway	Total	Place
1	Ketil Stokkan	"Brandenburger Tor"	52	36	56	44	60	53	54	355	1
2	Stein Hauge and Twilight	"Sarah"	48	43	32	35	34	33	40	265	4
3	Liv Ingund Nygaard	"En dag vil friheten seire"	32	40	34	46	38	35	32	257	5
4	Jahn Teigen	"Smil"	37	60	44	38	39	48	50	316	2
5	Tor Endresen	"Café le swing"	46	36	49	52	44	46	39	312	3

== At Eurovision ==
On the night of the final Stokkan performed 9th in the running order, following Iceland and preceding Israel. At the close of voting "Brandenburger Tor" had received only 8 points, placing Norway joint last (with Finland) of the 22 entries. This was the seventh time Norway finished the evening at the bottom of the scoreboard. The Norwegian jury awarded its 12 points to France.

The contest was televised on NRK Fjernsynet and on radio station NRK P2, both with commentary by Leif Erik Forberg.

=== Voting ===
Points awarded to Norway
Score	Country
12 points	
10 points	
8 points	
7 points	
6 points	
5 points	
4 points	Israel
3 points	Ireland
2 points	
1 point	Denmark

Points awarded by Norway
Score	Country
12 points	France
10 points	Iceland
8 points	Ireland
7 points	Denmark
6 points	Sweden
5 points	Spain
4 points	Turkey
3 points	Yugoslavia
2 points	Cyprus
1 point	Belgium
