= Austria in the Eurovision Song Contest 1990 =

- Eurovision Song Contest 1990
- Participating broadcaster: Österreichischer Rundfunk (ORF)
- Country: Austria
- Selection process: National final
- Selection date: 15 March 1990

Competing entry
- Song: "Keine Mauern mehr"
- Artist: Simone Stelzer
- Songwriters: Marc Berry; Nanna Berry; Mario Botazzi

Placement
- Final result: 10th, 58 points

Participation chronology

Austria was represented at the Eurovision Song Contest 1990 with the song "Keine Mauern mehr", composed by Marc Berry and Nanna Berry, with lyrics by Mario Botazzi, and performed by Simone Stelzer. The Austrian participating broadcaster Österreichischer Rundfunk (ORF), organised a national final in order to select its entry for the contest. The national final was won by the song "Das Beste" performed by Duett, but it was disqualified later, and the runner-up "Keine Mauern mehr" was declared the Austrian entry for Eurovision.

== Before Eurovision ==
=== National final ===
Österreichischer Rundfunk (ORF) held the national final on 15 March 1990 at Studio Z1 of the ORF-Zentrum in Vienna, hosted by Lizzi Engstler, who represented Austria in 1982 as part of the duo, Mess.

The winner was decided through a mixture of televoting (50%) and an expert jury (50%). The winner of the final was the song "Das Beste" performed by Duett.

Winner

Final – 15 March 1990
R/O	Artist	Song	Percentage	Place
1	Alex	"Freiheit"	16.3%	7
2	Gruppe Papageno	"Papagena"	25.4%	3
3	Stefanie Pascal	"Mit dir geh'n"	12.3%	9
4	Nika	"Ein kleiner Stern"	16.4%	6
5	Eugene Price	"Tausend Feuer sind in mir"	16.7%	5
6	Waterloo	"So ein wunderschönes Leben"	23.8%	4
7	Erwin Bros	"Für Kinder sieht das anders aus"	12.7%	8
8	Duett	"Das Beste"	39.3%	1
9	Roxy	"Sandy"	9.9%	10
10	Simone Stelzer	"Keine Mauern mehr"	27.6%	2

=== Disqualification and replacement ===
The winning entry was disqualified later after it was revealed it had entered the 1988 German national final. The song "Keine Mauern mehr" performed by Simone Stelzer was then declared the winner and the Austrian entry for Eurovision.

== At Eurovision ==
Stelzer performed 20th on the night of the contest, following Italy and preceding Cyprus. At the close of the voting she had received 58 points, placing 10th of 22 countries competing.

=== Voting ===
Points awarded to Austria
Score	Country
12 points	Italy
10 points	
8 points	United Kingdom; Yugoslavia
7 points	Turkey
6 points	Iceland
5 points	Luxembourg
4 points	
3 points	France
2 points	Belgium; Finland; Ireland; Sweden
1 point	Netherlands

Points awarded by Austria
Score	Country
12 points	Ireland
10 points	Iceland
8 points	Spain
7 points	Italy
6 points	Denmark
5 points	Luxembourg
4 points	Belgium
3 points	Germany
2 points	France
1 point	United Kingdom
