= Sweden in the Eurovision Song Contest 1990 =

- Eurovision Song Contest 1990
- Participating broadcaster: Sveriges Television (SVT)
- Country: Sweden
- Selection process: Melodifestivalen 1990
- Selection date: 9 March 1990

Competing entry
- Song: "Som en vind"
- Artist: Edin-Ådahl
- Songwriter: Mikael Wendt

Placement
- Final result: 16th, 24 points

Participation chronology

Sweden was represented at the Eurovision Song Contest 1990 with the song "Som en vind", written by Mikael Wendt, and performed by the band Edin-Ådahl. The Swedish participating broadcaster, Sveriges Television (SVT), selected its entry through Melodifestivalen 1990.

== Before Eurovision ==
=== Melodifestivalen 1990 ===
Melodifestivalen 1990 was the contest for selection of the 30th song to represent Sweden at the Eurovision Song Contest. It was the 29th time that this method of picking a song had been used. 1,223 songs were submitted to Sveriges Television (SVT) for the competition. The final was held in the Rondo in Gothenburg on 9 March 1990, presented by Carin Hjulström and was broadcast on TV2 but not on radio. The show was watched by 5,964,000 people, the biggest recorded audience for the competition (74.1% of Sweden's 1990 population).

Edin-Ådahl won the Melodifestivalen with the song "Som en vind", written by Mikael Wendt, and beating 1983 representative Carola Häggkvist to second place.

| R/O | Artist | Song | Songwriter(s) | Points | Place |
|---|---|---|---|---|---|
| 1 | Elisabeth Andreasson | "Jag ser en stjärna falla" | Peter Stedt | 53 | 7 |
| 2 | Peter Jöback | "En sensation" | Christer Lundh; Mikael Wendt | 43 | 9 |
| 3 | Lizette Pålsson | "Sången över havet" | Hans Skoog; Martin Klaman | 56 | 6 |
| 4 | N'Gang | "Vi vill ha värme" | Mikael Erlandsson; Robert Ardin; Peter Andersson; Niklas Börjesson; Lars Sandrén | 73 | 5 |
| 5 | Lotta Engberg | "En gång till" | Christer Lundh; Mikael Wendt | 49 | 8 |
| 6 | Lisbet Jagedal | "Varje natt" | Ingela 'Pling' Forsman; Lasse Holm | 76 | 3 |
| 7 | Loa Falkman | "Symfonin" | Elisabeth Lord; Tommy Gunnarsson | 30 | 10 |
| 8 | Carola Häggkvist | "Mitt i ett äventyr" | Stephan Berg | 84 | 2 |
| 9 | Edin-Ådahl | "Som en vind" | Mikael Wendt | 99 | 1 |
| 10 | Sofia Källgren | "Handen på hjärtat" | Ingela 'Pling' Forsman; Lasse Holm | 75 | 4 |

Voting
| R/O | Song | Malmö | Luleå | Umeå | Sundsvall | Falun | Karlstad | Örebro | Stockholm | Norrköping | Växjö | Gothenburg | Total |
|---|---|---|---|---|---|---|---|---|---|---|---|---|---|
| 1 | "Jag ser en stjärna falla" | 6 | 1 | 3 | 8 | 1 | 7 | 2 | 8 | 2 | 3 | 12 | 53 |
| 2 | "En sensation" | 5 | 4 | 1 | 1 | 4 | 1 | 6 | 4 | 7 | 6 | 4 | 43 |
| 3 | "Sången över havet" | 3 | 5 | 6 | 6 | 5 | 8 | 7 | 5 | 1 | 8 | 2 | 56 |
| 4 | "Vi vill ha värme" | 12 | 12 | 12 | 3 | 2 | 5 | 4 | 1 | 10 | 2 | 10 | 73 |
| 5 | "En gång till" | 2 | 3 | 7 | 12 | 3 | 4 | 3 | 3 | 5 | 4 | 3 | 49 |
| 6 | "Varje natt" | 4 | 10 | 8 | 10 | 6 | 6 | 8 | 6 | 8 | 5 | 5 | 76 |
| 7 | "Symphonin" | 1 | 2 | 2 | 4 | 10 | 2 | 1 | 2 | 4 | 1 | 1 | 30 |
| 8 | "Mitt i ett äventyr" | 8 | 8 | 4 | 2 | 12 | 10 | 12 | 7 | 6 | 7 | 8 | 84 |
| 9 | "Som en vind" | 10 | 6 | 5 | 5 | 8 | 12 | 10 | 12 | 12 | 12 | 7 | 99 |
| 10 | "Handen på hjärtat" | 7 | 7 | 10 | 7 | 7 | 3 | 5 | 10 | 3 | 10 | 6 | 75 |

== At Eurovision ==
At the contest Sweden performed 18th, following Ireland and preceding Italy. At the close of the voting they had received 24 points, being placed 16th of 22 countries competing.

=== Voting ===
Points awarded to Sweden
| Score | Country |
|---|---|
| 12 points | |
| 10 points | |
| 8 points | |
| 7 points | |
| 6 points | Netherlands; Norway; United Kingdom |
| 5 points | |
| 4 points | |
| 3 points | |
| 2 points | Germany; Greece; Spain |
| 1 point | |

Points awarded by Sweden
| Score | Country |
|---|---|
| 12 points | Ireland |
| 10 points | Italy |
| 8 points | Iceland |
| 7 points | Belgium |
| 6 points | Cyprus |
| 5 points | France |
| 4 points | Germany |
| 3 points | Denmark |
| 2 points | Austria |
| 1 point | Yugoslavia |
