= Puhovski =

Puhovski is a Croatian surname. Notable people with the surname include:

- Nenad Puhovski (born 1949), Croatian film director and producer
- Žarko Puhovski (born 1946), Croatian professor, political analyst, philosopher, and intellectual
