= Joëlle Ursull =

French singer of Guadeloupean origins (born 1960)

- Born: Joëlle Ursull; 9 November 1960 (age 65); Pointe-à-Pitre, Guadeloupe, France
- Genres: Zouk
- Occupation: Singer
- Formerly of: Zouk Machine

Joëlle Ursull (born 9 November 1960) is a French singer.

She performed "White and Black Blues", composed by Georges Augier de Moussac with lyrics by Serge Gainsbourg, in the Eurovision Song Contest 1990 of 5 May 1990. She scored 132 points and was joint second with Ireland, behind "Insieme: 1992" by Toto Cutugno. The single was a hit in France, where it peaked at #2 and remained charted for 26 weeks.

Previously, Ursull was a member of the trio Zouk Machine. Alone, she released the albums Miyel and Black French.

== Biography ==
=== Early life ===
Joëlle Ursull was born on 9 November 1960 in Pointe-à-Pitre. She was elected Miss Morne-à-l'Eau before becoming Miss Guadeloupe in 1979. Ursull worked as a television actress in a sitcom produced by RFO. Later, she embarked on a modelling career before forming the group Zouk Machine. Among her influences are the Caribbean Zouk, Biguine, Reggae, Ragga, Quadrille, Salsa, and Merengue.

=== The creation of Zouk Machine ===
Zouk Machine was created by Guy Houllier and Yves Honore. They called Joëlle Ursull who is a friend of the family, Christiane Obydol who is the sister of Guy Houllier and Lisette Obydol who was called "Mama Zouk" and manager of the group at the time. She was one of three founding members of the group. The group won a great success from the release of their eponymous first album. In 1988, Ursull left the group attempted a career as a soloist.

=== Career soloist ===
In 1988, she released her first album entitled Miyel. In 1990, she represented France at the Eurovision Song Contest and also released her second album entitled Black French. In 1993, Ursull released her third album As in a Film which had more of a blues influence.

After becoming a mother, Ursull dedicated her life to the education of her two daughters. However, she found time to participate in a different project, singing on a single for the Mothers & Fathers duet with Jacques D'Arbaud, a duet on the album of the comic Pat. She also sang on another in 1999 with the reggae artist Djamatik. In 2003, she released a single called Babydoo. From 2004 to 2006 she participated in numerous shows in the West Indies and Paris. Urusll is working on a new album planned for release in 2011.

== Discography ==
=== Albums ===
1. Zouk Machine (1986)
2. Miyel (1988)
3. Black French (1990)
4. As in a Film (1993)
5. Black & White Blues (2000) Compilation

=== Singles ===
1. "Sové Lanmou" (1986)
2. "Zouk Machine" (1987)
3. "Miyel" (1989)
4. "White and Black Blues" (1990) #2 in France
5. "Amazone" (1990) #26 in France
6. "Position Feeling" (1991) #50 in France
7. "Syiel Tambou" (1993)
8. "Babydoo" (2003)

=== Participations ===
1. "Tallulah (Escale Tropicale)" With Eddy The Viny (1985)
2. "Serre Moi" Duo with Kova Rea (1992) #43 in France
3. "Merci Maman Merci Papa" Duo with Jacques D'Arbaud (1999)
4. "Bondié" Duo with Pat '(1999)
5. "À chacun son vécu" Duo with Djamatik (1999)
6. "Tibwen Chalè" Unis-Sons Together against AIDS (2004)
7. "Baby fait moi kiffé" Duo with Arsenik (2005)
8. "Love" With Daddy Yod (2006)
9. "Ou Bel" Album Proposal (2007)
10. "My Lady" Duo with Diggy Star (2008)

Preceded by Nathalie Pâque with J'ai volé la vie	France in the Eurovision Song Contest; 1990	Succeeded by Amina with C'est le dernier qui a parlé qui a raison
