= Sigga =

Icelandic singer (born 1962)

Sigríður María Beinteinsdóttir, better known as Sigga Beinteins, is an Icelandic singer who competed for her native country in the Eurovision Song Contest three times. She was born on 26 July 1962 in Reykjavík.

Contest	Act	Song	Position	Points
1990	(Iceland) part of Stjórnin	"Eitt lag enn"	4th out of 22	124
1992	(Iceland) part of Heart 2 Heart	"Nei eða já"	7th out of 23	80
1994	(Iceland) Soloist	"Nætur"	12th out of 25	49

She got three 12-point votes overall, two from the United Kingdom and one from Portugal. With Stjórnin, she achieved Iceland's best result of fourth place until 1999, when Selma Björnsdóttir came second.

On 17 February 2024, she was the inaugural awardee of the Heiðurshöll Söngvakeppninnar or the Söngvakeppnin Hall of Fame for her contribution to the competition over the years.

Preceded by Ingibjörg Stefánsdóttir with "Þá veistu svarið"	Iceland in the Eurovision Song Contest; 1994	Succeeded by Björgvin Halldórsson with "Núna"
