= Stjórnin =

Icelandic musical duo

Stjórnin is an Icelandic music duo composed of singers Grétar Örvarsson (born 11 July 1959) and Sigríður Beinteinsdóttir (born 24 July 1962). Together, they represented Iceland at the Eurovision Song Contest 1990 held in Zagreb. Their entry, "Eitt lag enn" was placed fourth out of 22 songs. Both singers were later members of another Eurovision group Heart 2 Heart who represented Iceland in 1992 with the song "Nei eða já". This entry was placed seventh out of 23 in Malmö.

Beinteinsdóttir, under the stage name Sigga, made a third Eurovision appearance for Iceland, as a soloist, in 1994. Her song "Nætur" was placed 12th out of 25 entries in Dublin.

== Discography ==
=== Albums ===
- Eitt lag enn (1990)
- Tvö líf (1991)
- Stjórnin (1992)
- Rigg (1993)
- Stjórnarlögin 1989-1995 (1995)
- Sumar nætur (1996)
- Stjórnin@2000 (1999)
- Ég fæ aldrei nóg af þér (2018)

=== Singles ===
Single	Year	Peak chart positions	Album or EP
Single	Year	ISL	Album or EP
"Ég fæ aldrei nóg af þér"	2018	—	Ég fæ aldrei nóg af þér
"Enn ein jól"	2018	—	Non-album single
"Segðu já"	2019	—	Non-album single
"Hleypum gleðinni inn"	2021	80	Non-album single
"Í skýjunum"	2022	—	Non-album single
"I lare ei"	2022	—	Non-album single
"Stjórnlaus"	2023	40	Non-album single

Preceded by Daníel Ágúst with "Það sem enginn sér"	Iceland in the Eurovision Song Contest; 1990	Succeeded by Stefán & Eyfi with "Draumur um Nínu"
