= Tajči =

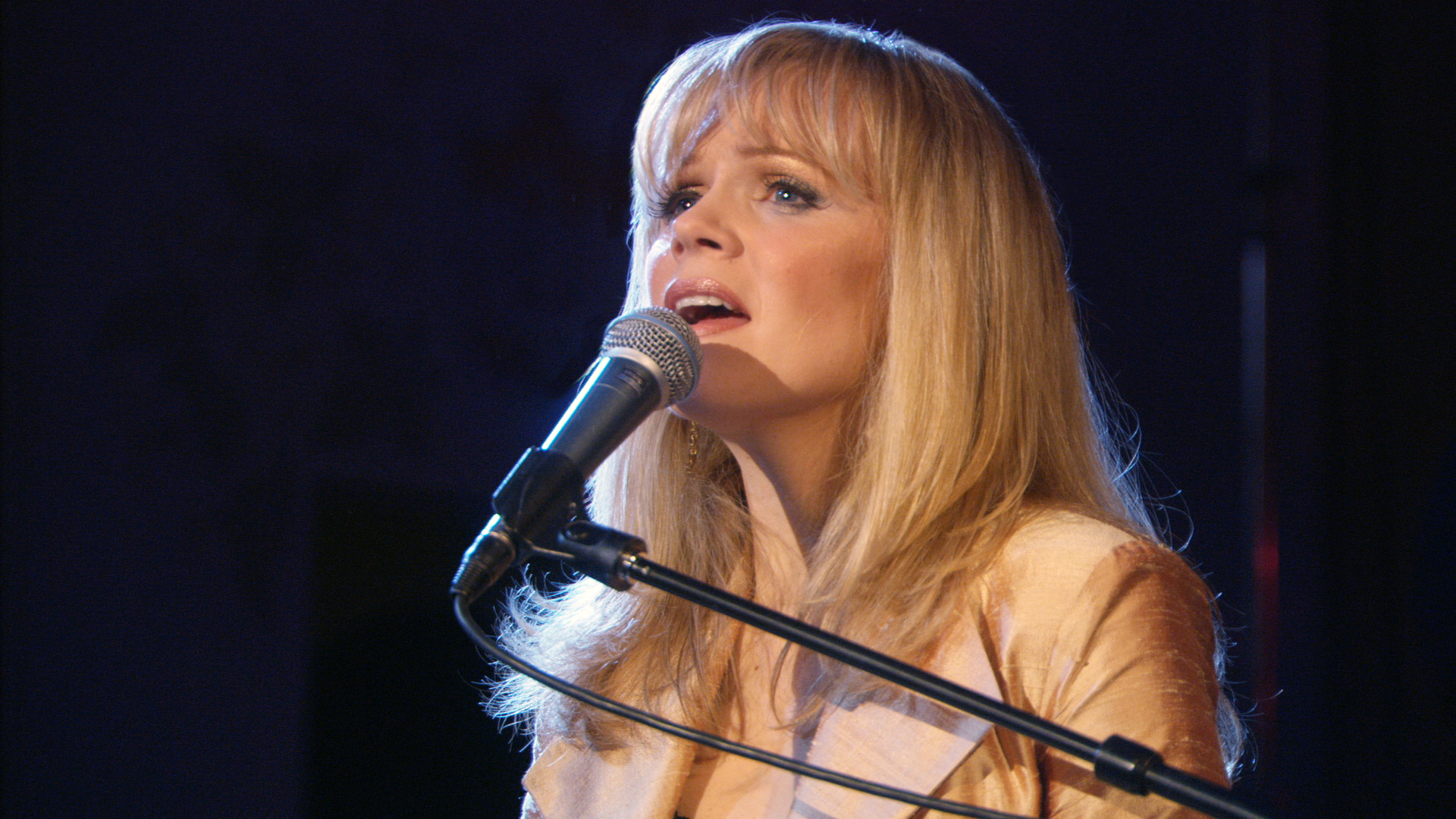
- Tajči Christmas Concert in Chicago, 2006

Background information
- Also known as: Tajči, Tatiana Cameron
- Born: Tatjana Matejaš; 1 July 1970 (age 56); Zagreb, SR Croatia, SFR Yugoslavia (now Croatia)
- Genres: Pop; rock; Pop Jazz; Singer/ Songwriter
- Occupation: Singer-songwriter
- Instruments: Piano; guitar; vocals
- Years active: 1987–present
- Labels: Croatia Records; Cameron Productions (Tajko Music); Jugoton

Tatjana Cameron (née Matejaš, pronounced [tǎtjana mǎtejaʃ]; born on 1 July 1970), known professionally as Tajči (/ˈtaɪtʃi/ TY-chee, Croatian: [tǎjtʃi]), is a Croatian singer, television show host, published author and blogger, who now lives in the United States.

On 10 October 2025, she appeared on the Balkanskom Unicom show in Serbia where she discussed her experience with being raped during the height of her popularity in the region of Yugoslavia. She also shared how she contemplated suicide after and almost jumped off a cliff with her car.

== Career ==
As a pop star in the former Yugoslavia in the late 1980s and early 1990s, Tajči won the national selection of RTV Zagreb, SR Croatia and represented Yugoslavia at the Eurovision Song Contest 1990. The contest was held in Zagreb and she sang the song "Hajde da ludujemo" ("Let's go crazy"). Her Yugoslav music career was cut short by the breakup of Yugoslavia and the subsequent war.

She left Croatia in 1992 and a year later graduated from the American Musical and Dramatic Academy in New York. She appeared in numerous off Broadway productions and landed a lead role in "Miracle of Christmas" a mega-production at Sight and Sound Theatre, Lancaster, Pennsylvania. During her time in New York, she was signed by Camile Barbone and produced the "Age of Love" CD recorded at Long View Farms Studio.

In 1994, she returned to Croatia and starred in a production of Kiss Me Kate by Croatian National Theatre, Rijeka. She moved to Los Angeles in 1997 seeking to expand her performing skills through television and film. She continued her musical theater career with roles in Brigadoon produced by Starlight Theatre in San Diego and The Phantom of the Opera at the San Gabriel Mission Playhouse. In 1997–98, she produced a series of benefit concerts at the Sacred Heart Retreat House in Alhambra, California, where she met Matthew Cameron, whom she married in 1999. She ended up performing music in Roman Catholic churches while auditioning for roles, some of which she rejected because they required nudity.

In late 2004, she and her family relocated to Cincinnati, Ohio, a more central location for her heavy touring schedule with concerts. In 2011, Yamaha Entertainment Group produced a remake of her mega-hit from the 1990s "Dvije zvjezdice". She released an indie pop album Awaken in 2013 on which she collaborated with Bryan Lennox, a Grammy Award-winning producer. Tajči wrote a full-length musical, My Perfectly Beautiful Life, which was produced by Cincinnati Playwright Initiative at the Jarson-Kaplan Theatre in February 2010.

Tajči, her husband and their three children relocated to Franklin, Tennessee in 2014, the same year she started producing and hosting TV show "Waking Up in America" and in 2015 founded "Waking Up Revolution", a multi platform brand. She is also a certified Holistic Life Coach through Radiant Health Institute, certified as 65 hours of Approved Coach Specific Training Hours by the International Coach Federation.

Collaborating with Nashville songwriters, Tajči co-wrote "Window in the Wall" (Tom Paden, Eddie Kilgallon, Tajči) a song recorded by Olivia Newton-John and Chloe Latanzzo, and in 2023 "Holding Out My Hand" (Steve Leslie, Tajči). In 2024, Tajči was a guest on HRT's travel documentary television series Sretni gradovi, where she discussed her life in Tennessee in an episode dedicated to Nashville.

== Personal life ==
Tajči married Matthew Cameron, whom she met in church, in 1999. The couple have three sons, Dante, Evan, and Blais. She lost her husband Matthew to stage four non-small-cell lung cancer (NSCLC) in 2017.

Her sister is Croatian-American actress and singer Sanja Matejaš, known as Sanya Mateyas. Mateyas played the role of Myra Menke in 2003 film Holes. She also was a leader and a composer for her Los Angeles–based hard-rock band Duda Did It, with an independent album released in 2008 and a singer for Trans-Siberian Orchestra.

== Legacy ==
Her trademark song "Hajde da ludujemo" is a staple of Yugoslav-themed concerts and numerous covers have emerged through the years. Street performer and guitarist Dušan Crnobrnja performs a cover during his concerts at Knez Mihailova Street in Belgrade.

== Discography ==
- Hajde Da Ludujemo (1990)
- Bube u glavi (1991)
- All american (1991)
- VHS Bube u glavi (1991)
- The best of Tajči (1992)
- Taichi Eqinocij (1997)
- Struggles & Graces (1997)
- Now and Forever (2000)
- Emmanuel – The Story of Christmas (2002)
- Let It Be – Mary's Story (2003)
- I Thirst (2004)
- Zlatna kolekcija (2004)
- A Chance to Dream (2006)
- Need A Break (2008)
- The love collection (2011)
- God bless America (2010)
- Dell'aurora tu sorgi piu bella (2011)
- AWAKEN (2014)

Preceded by Riva	Yugoslavia in the Eurovision Song Contest; 1990	Succeeded by Bebi Dol
