= Ireland in the Eurovision Song Contest 1990 =

- Eurovision Song Contest 1990
- Participating broadcaster: Radio Telefís Éireann (RTÉ)
- Country: Ireland
- Selection process: Eurosong '90
- Selection date: 25 March 1990

Competing entry
- Song: "Somewhere in Europe"
- Artist: Liam Reilly
- Songwriter: Liam Reilly

Placement
- Final result: 2nd, 132 points

Participation chronology

Ireland was represented at the Eurovision Song Contest 1990 with the song "Somewhere in Europe", written and performed by Liam Reilly. The Irish participating broadcaster, Radio Telefís Éireann (RTÉ), selected its entry through a national final.

== Before Eurovision ==
=== Eurosong '90 ===
Radio Telefís Éireann (RTÉ) held Eurosong '90 on 25 March 1990 at the Gaiety Theatre in Dublin, hosted by Jimmy Greeley and Clíona Ní Bhuachalla. Eight songs competed in the event, and the winner was selected by twelve regional juries.

Liam Reilly had previously competed in the 1988 national final, where he placed second behind Jump the Gun. Linda Martin had previously represented Ireland in 1984 being runner-up to Sweden.

R/O	Artist	Song	Points	Place
1	The Memories	"If It Means Losing You"	57	8
2	Ann Breen	"Oh, Darling"	80	4
3	Fran Meen	"Say That You Love Me"	66	6
4	Dreams	"Sin sin"	73	5
5	Connor Stevens	"Count On Me"	88	3
6	Linda Martin and Friends	"All the People in the World"	105	2
7	Maggie Toal	"Feed Him with Love"	61	7
8	Liam Reilly	"Somewhere in Europe"	130	1

Detailed Regional Jury Votes
R/O	Song	Athlone	Cork	Dublin North	Dublin South	Dundalk	Ennis	Galway	Letterkenny	Sligo	Thurles	Tralee	Waterford	Total
1	"If It Means Losing You"	7	3	6	4	3	4	5	3	6	5	4	7	57
2	"Oh, Darling"	10	12	3	7	7	7	7	8	4	6	6	3	80
3	"Say That You Love Me"	6	5	8	3	4	6	6	4	5	10	5	4	66
4	"Sin sin"	8	6	5	6	8	5	3	7	8	3	8	6	73
5	"Count on Me"	5	7	7	5	6	12	10	5	7	7	7	10	88
6	"All the People in the World"	4	10	10	12	10	8	8	10	3	12	10	8	105
7	"Feed Him with Love"	3	4	4	8	5	3	4	6	12	4	3	5	61
8	"Somewhere in Europe"	12	8	12	10	12	10	12	12	10	8	12	12	130

== At Eurovision ==
"Somewhere In Europe" was performed 17th in the running order on the night of the contest, following Portugal and preceding Sweden. At the close of the voting sequence, Ireland had 132 points, tying them with France for second place.

Both Greeley and Ní Bhuachalla provided the Irish television commentary for RTÉ 1 television viewers, with Larry Gogan commentating for RTÉ Radio 1 listeners. RTÉ appointed Eileen Dunne as its spokesperson to announce the Irish jury votes.

=== Voting ===
Points awarded to Ireland
Score	Country
12 points	Austria; Sweden
10 points	Netherlands; Spain; United Kingdom
8 points	Denmark; Iceland; Norway
7 points	Belgium; France; Germany; Greece
6 points	Luxembourg; Portugal
5 points	Switzerland; Turkey
4 points	Finland
3 points	
2 points	
1 point	

Points awarded by Ireland
Score	Country
12 points	Italy
10 points	Germany
8 points	France
7 points	Iceland
6 points	United Kingdom
5 points	Yugoslavia
4 points	Denmark
3 points	Norway
2 points	Austria
1 point	Belgium
