= Oliver Mlakar =

Croatian television presenter

- Born: 1 July 1935 (age 91); Ptuj, Slovenia
- Education: University of Zagreb
- Occupation: Television presenter

Oliver Mlakar (born 1 July 1935) is a Croatian television presenter. Best known for hosting game shows, he was one of the most popular television personalities in SFR Yugoslavia and later Croatia.

== Biography ==
Mlakar was born in Ptuj and lived in Osijek from 1945 to 1954. He moved to Zagreb in 1954 to study French and Italian at the University of Zagreb and began working as an announcer for Radio Zagreb in 1957.

Mlakar became a full-time broadcaster for Television Zagreb in 1965, hosting Poziv na kviz with Jasmina Nikić, the first quiz show on Yugoslav television. Directed by Anton Marti, only several episodes were shot.

His most acclaimed work was as a games show host and he became known internationally for hosting Jeux Sans Frontières in the 1970s, and Kviskoteka, a highly popular quiz show that ran from 1980 to 1995. He co-hosted the 1990 Eurovision Song Contest held at the Vatroslav Lisinski Concert Hall in Zagreb (former Yugoslavia). Almost a decade later in 1999, Mlakar was still involved with Eurovision, hosting Dora, the Croatian heat of the song contest. From 1993 to 2002, Mlakar hosted Kolo sreće, the Croatian version of Wheel of Fortune. He retired from his job at the Croatian Radiotelevision in 2002 after fulfilling the age requirement for retirement (which is compulsory for the public broadcaster).

== See also ==
- List of Eurovision Song Contest presenters
- List of game show hosts

| Preceded by (Switzerland) Jacques Deschenaux and Lolita Morena | Eurovision Song Contest presenter (with Helga Vlahović); 1990 | Succeeded by (Italy) Gigliola Cinquetti and Toto Cutugno |
