= Helga Vlahović =

Croatian journalist, producer and television personality

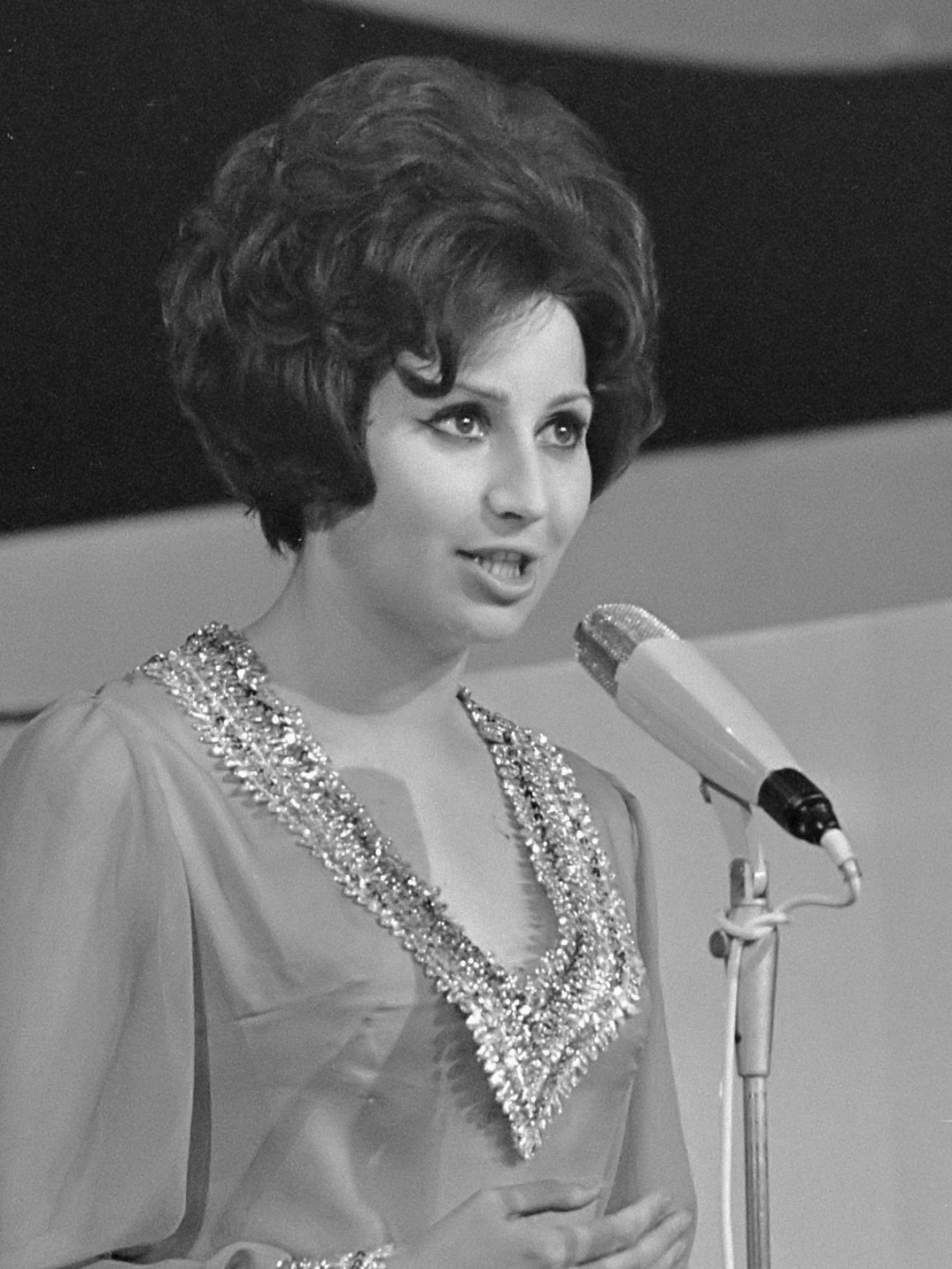
- Vlahović in 1969
- Born: 28 January 1945; Zagreb, Independent State of Croatia (present-day Croatia)
- Died: 27 February 2012 (aged 67); Zagreb, Croatia
- Education: University of Zagreb (left school)
- Occupation: Television producer
- Employer(s): JRT (1964–1991); HRT (1991–2006)
- Known for: Television production, television presentation

Helga Vlahović (28 January 1945 – 27 February 2012) was a Croatian journalist, producer, and television personality, whose career spanned five decades in both SFR Yugoslavia and later Croatia. She was one of the most popular television presenters in the 1980s. Throughout her career, she was also credited as Helga Vlahović Pea and Helga Vlahović Brnobić during the times she was married.

== Early life ==
Born in Zagreb to a Hungarian father, Kalman Vlahovics (or Vlahovicz), and an Austrian mother, Vera. Helga grew up speaking German with her mother while learning English.

== Career ==
Vlahović started working at Zagreb Radio and Television (part of the Yugoslav Radio Television network) in 1964, while studying German, English, and art history at the University of Zagreb. By 1966, she became an anchorwoman of various entertainment and musical TV shows, putting her in charge of such popular programs as TV Magazin and musical television shows. In 1968, she was selected to run the Sopot International Song Festival in Poland, and in 1971 she ran the song festival in Scheveningen, Netherlands. She was then placed in charge of the morning talk show Good Day, Yugoslavia (which she hosted) in 1972, as well as the music variety show, Svjetla pozornice (Stage Lights), in 1977 and 1978. From 1978 to 1980, she organized the Jadranski susreti (Adriatic Reunion, a Yugoslav version of Jeux Sans Frontières).

In 1984 and 1988, Vlahović organized Beč pozdravlja Zagreb, Zagreb pozdravlja Beč (Vienna Salutes Zagreb, Zagreb Salutes Vienna) and Dubrovnik-Stuttgart, musical and travelogue series broadcast between JRT, ORF, and ARD, respectively, geared at Yugoslav guest workers who wanted to "see home" but could not afford to make a trip there. Due to her extensive musical programming experience, as well as her proficiency in English, she was picked, along with Oliver Mlakar, to host the Eurovision Song Contest 1990 in Zagreb following Yugoslavia's win in 1989. She was also the presenter of Yugoslavia's jury votes in 1981 and famously said that she didn't have the votes.

With the fall of Yugoslavia in 1991 and the onset of the Croatian War of Independence, Vlahović was quickly put in charge of informational television series relating to the war on the newly formed HRT channel. She was head of "war information programming" until the end of war in 1995. In 1996, she started her own television series, Govorimo o zdravlju (We Talk About Health), which covered many health and wellness topics. Vlahović officially retired in 2006, but nevertheless maintained her television presence until her final broadcast on 1 January 2012.

== Personal life ==
Vlahović had two daughters, Renee Pea (born 1975), from her ten-year marriage to Franc Pea, and Karla Brnobić (born 1982), from her marriage to neurosurgeon Miljenko Brnobić, who died in 1997. It was his influence which inspired her to start the program Govorimo o zdravlju.

== Death ==
In 2009 Vlahović was diagnosed with uterine cancer. In early 2012 it was reported her condition has worsened and she was hospitalised. She died on 27 February 2012, aged 67.

== See also ==
- List of Eurovision Song Contest presenters

Preceded by (Switzerland) Jacques Deschenaux and Lolita Morena	Eurovision Song Contest presenter (with Oliver Mlakar); 1990	Succeeded by (Italy) Gigliola Cinquetti and Toto Cutugno
