= Willem van Beusekom =

Dutch broadcaster and television presenter (1947–2006)

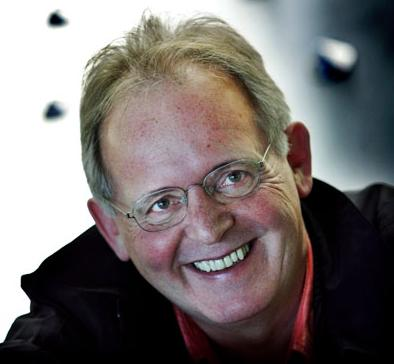
- Born: 4 May 1947; Weesp, Netherlands
- Died: 21 May 2006 (aged 59); Amsterdam, Netherlands
- Occupations: Radio DJ, broadcaster
- Known for: Eurovision Song Contest

Willem Jacobus Marius van Beusekom (4 May 1947 – 21 May 2006) was a Dutch broadcaster and television presenter. He was also active as a radio DJ and especially enjoyed fame as a Dutch television commentator for the Eurovision Song Contest, which he did from 1987 to 2005. His last position until his death was that of NPS Director.

== Career ==
He began his career in 1968 at the KRO TV. There he sat in one of the first panel of television music programs, Disco Duel of Herman Stok. Van Beusekom then moved to the VARA but remained involved in music. He presented the LP and profound Top 20 pop radio documentaries entitled Popreconstructie. In 1983, Van Beusekom was appointed radio director of VARA. When the NPS was created in 1995 he became director, he diplomatically tried the NPS a permanent place within the broadcasting system to provide. He also promoted cooperation with VARA and VPRO to Nederland 3, the home station broadcasting it.

== Other work ==
Van Beusekom was the founder of the Grand Prix of the Netherlands, a competition for young rock bands, which he led until 1993. In that year he became president of Conamus, a foundation that deals with the promotion of Dutch pop music.

=== Eurovision Song Contest ===
In 1976 and 1980 Van Beusekom provided the NOS Radio commentary for Dutch listeners in the Eurovision Song Contest. He became better known for his television commentary from 1987 until 1990 and from 1992 until 1994 and from 1996 until 2005. Van Beusekom also provided Dutch commentary on the 50th Anniversary Special in October 2005. On November 7, 2005 Van Beusekom announced his retirement from the Eurovision Song Contest saying I had some fantastic years with great artists, composers and song writers and with different results. But sometimes it's good to step back.

== Death ==
During the Eurovision Song Contest 2006, van Beusekom was in a hospital in Amsterdam. The next day, May 21, 2006, he died from colon cancer. He is buried at Zorgvlied cemetery.
