= Nenad Puhovski =

Croatian film director and producer (born 1949)

- Born: 29 April 1949 (age 77); Zagreb, PR Croatia, FPR Yugoslavia (modern Croatia)
- Occupations: Film director, film producer

Nenad Puhovski (born 29 April 1949) is a Croatian film director and producer.

== Early years ==
Puhovski was born 29 April 1949 in Zagreb, Croatia (then a part of Yugoslavia), where he attended elementary and high school.

He studied sociology and philosophy at the University of Zagreb, and graduated in film directing at the Zagreb Academy of Dramatic Art.

== Theatre and television ==
From 1975 to 1979 he worked as a dramaturge at the &TD Theatre, one of the most important independent Yugoslav theatres of the period. He directed Jenny, the Pirate's Bride (1974) and Emigrant Talks (1975) by Bertold Brecht, Pit, This is America, Too (1975) by Mile Rupčić, 1984 (1976) by George Orwell, Abduction (1977) by Željko Senečić and Travesties (1980) by Tom Stoppard. In 1990 he directed the Eurovision Song Contest 1990 in Zagreb.
