= Edin-Ådahl =

Swedish Christian contemporary music band

- Origin: Sweden
- Genres: Pop, contemporary Christian music
- Years active: 1977–1994

Edin-Ådahl were a Swedish CCM band from 1977 to 1994, composed of brothers Bertil and Lasse Edin and Simon and Frank Ådahl.

The group was formed on 10 June 1978 when brothers Simon (born 1957) and Frank Ådahl (born 1960) started playing with Gävle brothers Lasse (born 1954) and Bertil Edin (born 1958).

The group are best known for their 1990 hit "Som en vind" (English: "Like a Wind"). It won the 1990 Melodifestivalen and went on to place sixteenth at the Eurovision Song Contest. The following year, the band placed second in the Melodifestivalen. Simon Ådahl participated in 1995 together with Lasse Edin. Another song, "Revival", rose to No. 3 on Sweden's radio charts.

Their English albums had similar production quality when compared to secular albums, but also poor distribution and "lousy lyrics".

Frank Ådahl was the voice of Simba in the Swedish version of the 1994 animated film The Lion King. Two of the brothers released solo albums on Refuge in 1985. Bertil Edin released Cross the Border, and Simon Ådahl I'm In Touch. Lasse Edin formed a band called The Outsiders in 1990.

== Discography ==
=== Swedish releases ===
- Edin-Ådahl, (Prim) 1980
- Alibi, (CBS/Royal) 1982
- Maktfaktor, (Royal) 1983
- Tecken, (Prim) 1986
- Big Talk, (Royal/Cantio) 1989
- Into My Soul, (Cantio) 1990
- Reser till kärlek, (Cantio) 1991
- Kosmonaut Gagarins rapport, (Viva) 1992
- Minnen: 1980—1992, (Viva) 1994
- Komplett, (Media Point) 2009

=== English releases ===
- Alibi, (Refuge) 1983
- X-Factor, (Refuge) 1984
- Miracle, (Refuge) 1987
- Big Talk, (Royal Music/Refuge) (1989)
- Into My Soul, (Alarma World Music) (1990)
- Revival, (Alarma World Music/Cantio) (1991)

Preceded by Tommy Nilsson with "En dag"	Sweden in the Eurovision Song Contest; 1990	Succeeded by Carola with "Fångad av en stormvind"
