= Fritz Egner =

German broadcaster

- Born: 3 August 1949 (age 76)
- Occupation: Broadcaster
- Employer: Bayerischer Rundfunk (BR)
- Spouse: Katrin
- Children: One daughter and a son with his wife

Fritz Egner (born 3 August 1949 in Munich) is a German broadcaster.

After working for the AFN in the early 1970s, Egner joined the regional broadcaster Bayerischer Rundfunk in 1978, alongside his two friends and colleagues Thomas Gottschalk and Günther Jauch. He became well known to German television viewers when he hosted the entertainment game show Dingsda between 1985 and 1994. He also commentated for Germany at the 1990 Eurovision Song Contest, hosted the ZDF show Die Versteckte Kamera between 1995 and 2003, and for Sat.1 viewers, the shows WWW – Die Witzigsten Werbespots der Welt, XXO – Fritz & Co,

Currently he hosts the radio shows Fritz und Hits and Stars und Hits for Bayern 3; in addition he also hosts the Christmas radio show Christmas Hits mit Fritz.
