= Eurovision Song Contest 1990 =

International song competition

Date and venue
- Final: 5 May 1990
- Venue: Vatroslav Lisinski Concert Hall; Zagreb, Yugoslavia

Organisation
- Organiser: European Broadcasting Union (EBU)
- Scrutineer: Frank Naef

Production
- Host broadcaster: Jugoslavenska radiotelevizija (JRT); Radiotelevizija Zagreb (RTV Zagreb)
- Director: Nenad Puhovski
- Executive producer: Goran Radman
- Musical director: Seadeta Midžić
- Presenters: Oliver Mlakar; Helga Vlahović

Participants
- Number of entries: 22
- Participation map: Competing countries Countries that participated in the past but not in 1990

Vote
- Voting system: Each country awarded 12, 10, 8-1 point(s) to their 10 favourite songs
- Winning song: Italy "Insieme: 1992"

The Eurovision Song Contest 1990 was the 35th edition of the Eurovision Song Contest, held on 5 May 1990 at the Vatroslav Lisinski Concert Hall in Zagreb, Yugoslavia, (Note: In the Socialist Republic of Croatia, present-day Croatia) and presented by Oliver Mlakar and Helga Vlahović. It was organised by the European Broadcasting Union (EBU) and host broadcaster Radiotelevizija Zagreb (RTV Zagreb) on behalf of Jugoslavenska radiotelevizija (JRT), who staged the event after winning the 1989 contest for Yugoslavia with the song "Rock Me" by the group Riva. It was the first contest to be held in the Balkans and the only to be held in a socialist state.

Broadcasters from twenty-two countries participated in the contest, with the same countries that had participated in 1989 returning. The 1990 contest was the first to implement an age limit on the competing performers, following criticism of the participation of two child performers in the previous year's event; all artists were now required to be 16 or older at the time of the contest.

The winner was Italy for the second time in its history, with the song "Insieme: 1992", written and performed by Toto Cutugno. France and Ireland shared second place, with Iceland and Spain rounding out the top five countries. France and Spain both placed within the top 5 for the first time in several years, while Iceland recorded its best ever result up to that point.

== Location ==
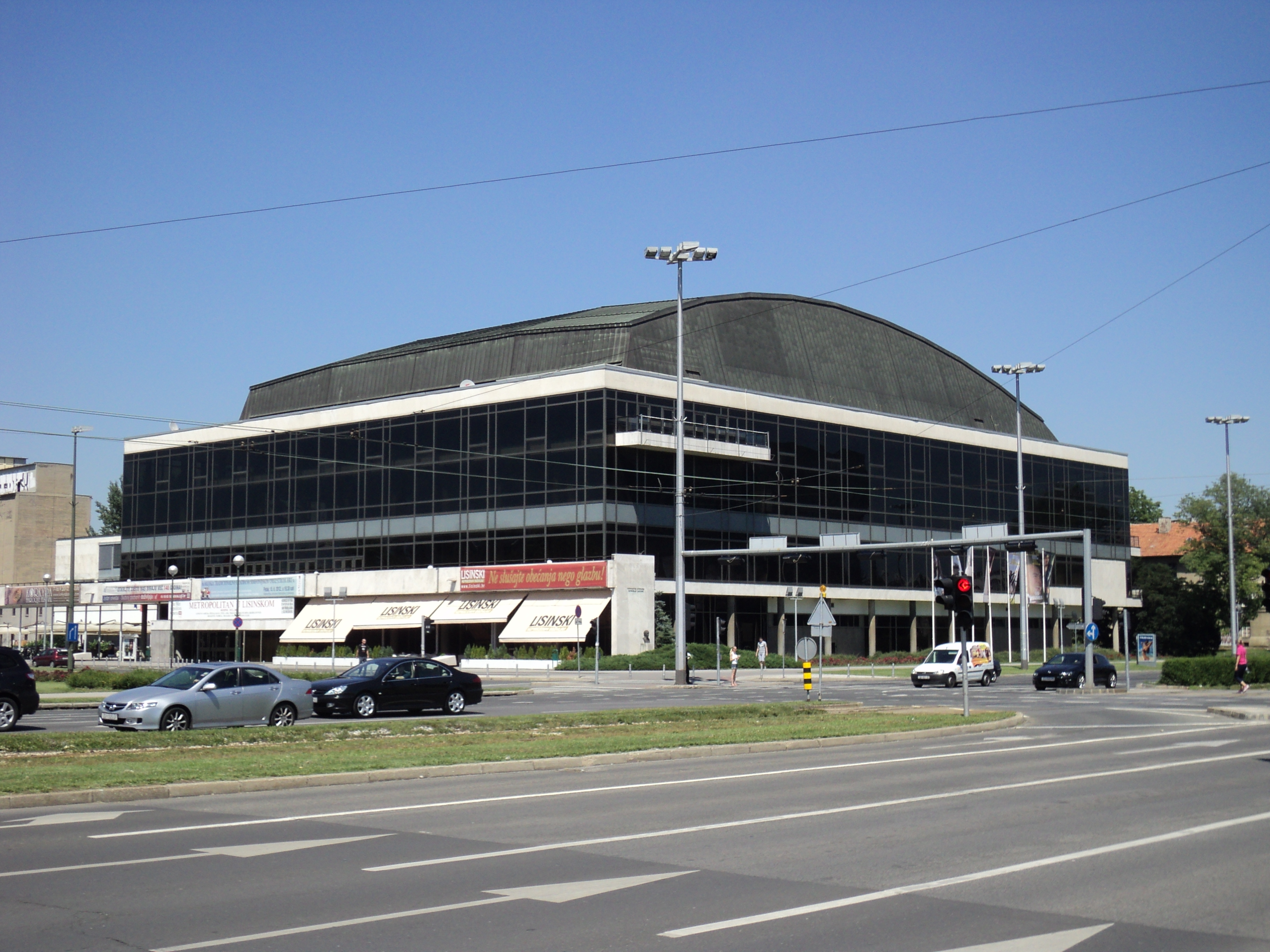
Vatroslav Lisinski Concert Hall, Zagreb – host venue of the 1990 contest

The 1990 contest took place in Zagreb, Yugoslavia, following the country's victory at the 1989 contest with the song "Rock Me", performed by the group Riva. It was the first time that Yugoslavia had hosted the contest, and marked the first time the contest had been held in the Balkans and the first edition to be held in a socialist state. The chosen venue was the Vatroslav Lisinski Concert Hall, (Note: Serbo-Croatian: Koncertna dvorana Vatroslava Lisinskog) named after the 19th-century Croatian composer Vatroslav Lisinski and whose main hall has an audience capacity of over 1,800. Constructed between 1963 and 1971, the venue underwent significant renovation ahead of hosting the Eurovision Song Contest. "Eurovision night club" was organised in the Ritz night club.

== Participants ==
Eurovision Song Contest 1990 – Participation summaries by country
- Austria; Belgium; Cyprus; Denmark; Finland; France; Germany; Greece; Iceland; Ireland; Israel; Italy; Luxembourg; Netherlands; Norway; Portugal; Spain; Sweden; Switzerland; Turkey; United Kingdom; Yugoslavia

The same twenty-two countries which had participated in 1989 returned for the 1990 contest; this marked the first time since 1972 that no changes to the composition of the competing countries were made compared to the previous event.

Among the competing artists in this year's event was Ketil Stokkan, who had also represented Norway in 1986. Additionally, Kari Kuivalainen, who had represented Finland in 1986, returned as a backing vocalist for the Finnish group Beat, and the Slovene group Pepel in kri supported Italy's Toto Cutugno as backing vocalists, having previously represented Yugoslavia in 1975.

Many of the competing songs made reference to the changing political and social landscape across the European continent following revolutions in Central and Eastern European countries in 1989 and spoke of the future of the European continent. The Finnish and German entries referenced the increasing freedoms experienced by citizens in countries formerly under repressive regimes, the Austrian and Norwegian entries harked back to the fall of the Berlin Wall six months prior and the opening of frontiers along the Iron Curtain between east and west Europe, while the Italian entry made reference to the planned signing of the Maastricht Treaty in 1992 which would form the European Union and lead to greater European integration. Other social and political messages were also present among the competing entries, including a message for racial harmony from France, an ode to the environment from the United Kingdom, and Belgium's Philippe Lafontaine presenting a love song for his Macedonian wife.

Eurovision Song Contest 1990 participants
Country	Broadcaster	Artist	Song	Language	Songwriter(s)	Conductor
Austria	ORF	Simone	"Keine Mauern mehr"	German	Mario Bottazzi; Nanna Berry; Wolfgang Berry	Richard Oesterreicher
Belgium	RTBF	Philippe Lafontaine	"Macédomienne"	French	Philippe Lafontaine	Rony Brack
Cyprus	CyBC	Anastasiou	"Milas poli" (Μιλάς πολύ)	Greek	Haris Anastasiou; John Vickers	Stanko Selak
Denmark	DR	Lonnie Devantier	"Hallo Hallo"	Danish	John Hatting; Keld Heick; Torben Lendager	Henrik Krogsgaard
Finland	YLE	Beat	"Fri?"	Swedish	Janne Engblom; Kim Engblom; Stina Engblom; Tina Krause	Olli Ahvenlahti
France	Antenne 2	Joëlle Ursull	"White and Black Blues"	French	Georges Augier de Moussac; Serge Gainsbourg	Régis Dupré
Germany	BR (Note: On behalf of the German public broadcasting consortium ARD)	Chris Kempers and Daniel Kovac	"Frei zu leben"	German	Michael Kunze; Ralph Siegel	Rainer Pietsch
Greece	ERT	Christos Callow	"Horis skopo" (Χωρίς σκοπό)	Greek	Giorgos Palaiokastriris; Giorgos Papagiannakis	Michalis Rozakis
Iceland	RÚV	Stjórnin	"Eitt lag enn"	Icelandic	Aðalsteinn Ásberg Sigurðsson; Hörður G. Ólafsson	Jon Kjell Seljeseth
Ireland	RTÉ	Liam Reilly	"Somewhere in Europe"	English	Liam Reilly	Noel Kelehan
Israel	IBA	Rita	"Shara Barkhovot" (שרה ברחובות)	Hebrew	Rami Kleinstein; Tzruya Lahav	Rami Levin
Italy	RAI	Toto Cutugno	"Insieme: 1992"	Italian	Toto Cutugno	Gianni Madonini
Luxembourg	CLT	Céline Carzo	"Quand je te rêve"	French	Thierry Delianis; Jean-Charles France	Thierry Durbet
Netherlands	NOS	Maywood	"Ik wil alles met je delen"	Dutch	Alice May	Harry van Hoof
Norway	NRK	Ketil Stokkan	"Brandenburger Tor"	Norwegian	Ketil Stokkan	Pete Knutsen
Portugal	RTP	Nucha	"Há sempre alguém"	Portuguese	Luís Filipe; Francisco Teotónio Pereira; Frederico Teotónio Pereira; Jan van Dijck	Carlos Alberto Moniz
Spain	TVE	Azúcar Moreno	"Bandido"	Spanish	José Luis Abel; Raúl Orellana; Jaime Stinus	Eduardo Leiva
Sweden	SVT	Edin-Ådahl	"Som en vind"	Swedish	Mikael Wendt	Curt-Eric Holmquist
Switzerland	SRG SSR	Egon Egemann	"Musik klingt in die Welt hinaus"	German	Cornelia Lackner	Bela Balint
Turkey	TRT	Kayahan	"Gözlerinin Hapsindeyim"	Turkish	Kayahan Açar	Ümit Eroğlu
United Kingdom	BBC	Emma	"Give a Little Love Back to the World"	English	Paul Curtis	Alyn Ainsworth
Yugoslavia	JRT	Tajči	"Hajde da ludujemo" (Хајде да лудујемо)	Serbo-Croatian	Alka Vuica; Zrinko Tutić	Stjepan Mihaljinec

== Production ==
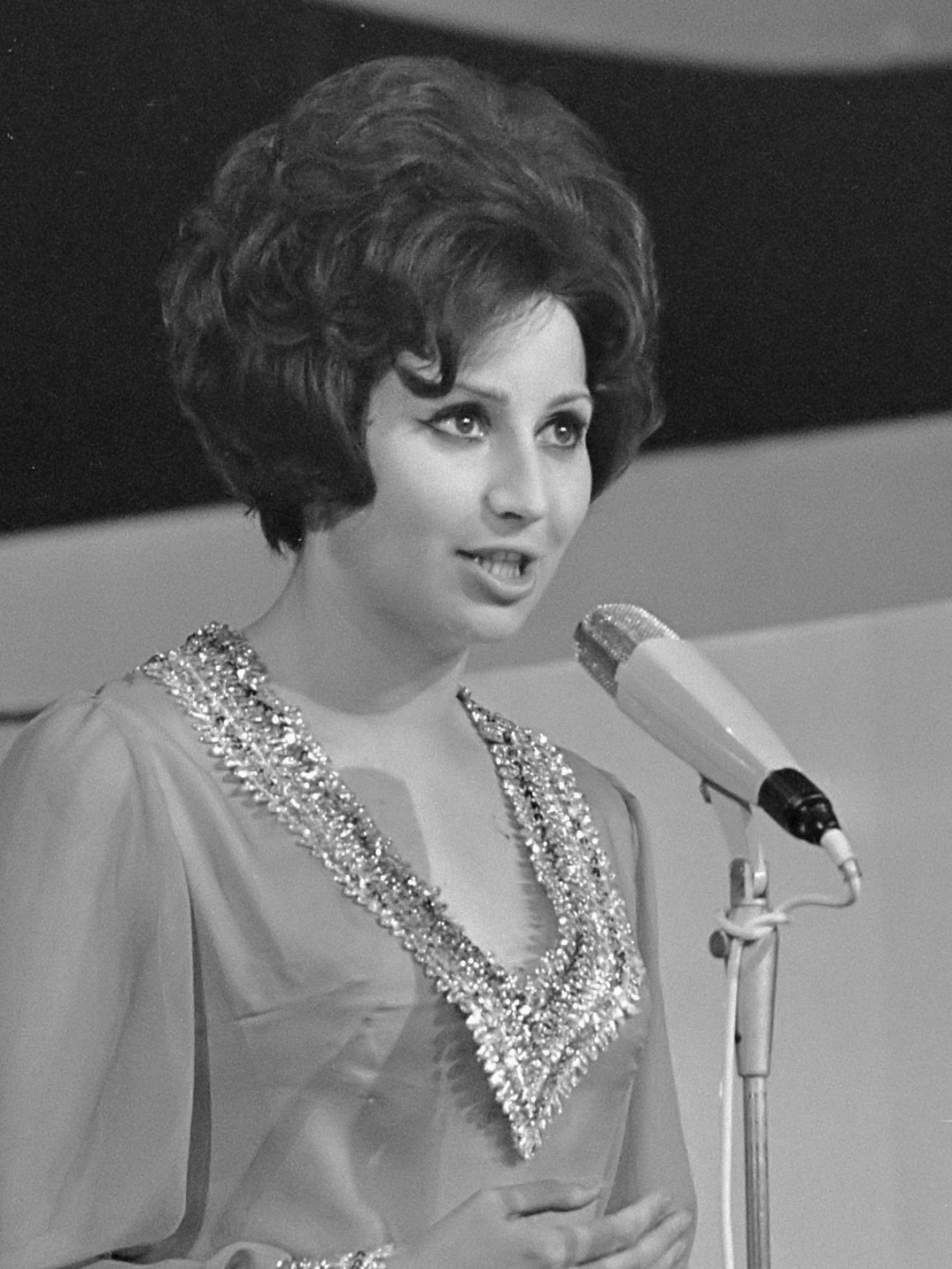
Helga Vlahović (pictured in 1969) was one of the presenters of the contest.

The Eurovision Song Contest 1990 was produced by the Yugoslav public broadcaster Radiotelevizija Zagreb (RTV Zagreb) on behalf of Jugoslavenska radiotelevizija (JRT). Goran Radman served as executive producer, Nenad Puhovski served as director, Zvjezdana Kvočić served as designer, Seadeta Midžić served as musical director, and Igor Kuljerić served as conductor leading an assembled orchestra, with assistance from Stanko Selak. A separate musical director could be appointed by each participating delegation to lead the orchestra during its country's performance, with the host conductors also available to conduct for those which did not appoint their own conductor. On behalf of the contest organisers, the European Broadcasting Union (EBU), the event was overseen by Frank Naef as scrutineer. Over 400 journalists covered the event. The overall costs to organise the contest was about 6 million Convertible Yugoslav dinars (US$1,250,000 in 2026).

Following the confirmation of the twenty-two competing countries, the draw to determine the running order of the contest was held on 10 November 1989.

Rehearsals for the participating artists began on 30 April 1990. Two technical rehearsals were conducted for each participating delegation in the week approaching the contest, with countries rehearsing in the order in which they would perform. The first rehearsals, comprising 15 minutes for stage set-up and 35 minutes for performances, were held on 30 April and 1 May. Following these rehearsals each delegation was provided an opportunity to watch back recordings of its entrant's performances and engage in a press conference. Each country's second rehearsals were held on 2 and 3 May and lasted 35 minutes total, followed by another viewing session and press conference. Three dress rehearsals were held with all artists, two held in the afternoon and evening of 4 May and one final rehearsal in the afternoon of 5 May. An audience was present during the two dress rehearsals held on 4 May; the final dress rehearsal on 5 May was also recorded for use as a production standby for use should broadcast of the live event became impossible.

During the week of rehearsals, problems arose regarding the choice of presenters for the event. Oliver Mlakar and Helga Vlahović had been selected to host the contest, officially announced publicly in March 1990, however a second couple, Rene Medvešek and Dubravka Marković, had also been chosen as a reserve hosting pair. No agreement on which duo would host the contest had been settled going into the rehearsal week however, and screen tests of the voting sequence with the contest's executive supervisor Frank Naef were scheduled to determine which of the pairings would get the job. The ages of Mlakar and Vlahović, respectively 54 and 45 years old at the time, had also resulted in criticism from press outlets ahead of the contest. Subsequently, Mlakar and Vlahović walked away during rehearsals on the Wednesday before the event and announced their resignations as show hosts, leading to a hastily arranged press conference to announce Medvešek and Marković as their replacements. Meetings held behind closed doors over the following 24 hours however led to Mlakar and Vlahović returning to the contest as the show's presenters.

For the first time in its history the contest featured an official mascot, "Eurocat", an animated anthropomorphic cat created by the Croatian illustrator Joško Marušić. Eurocat featured within the video postcards which served as an introduction to each country's entry, as well as providing an opportunity for transition between entries and allow stage crew to make changes on stage. The postcards for the 1990 contest centered around the theme of tourism, in conjunction with 1990 being the European Year of Tourism; each participating delegation commissioned its own postcard to highlight their country as a tourist destination, with Eurocat introducing these clips while highlighting cultural stereotypes associated with the competing countries.

With the advent of music videos during the 1980s, the television production of the contest also adapted to new aesthetics as it entered the 1990s; in contrast to previous editions, the 1990 contest saw an increased use of dynamic camera direction, with footage captured from cameras moving to and around the stage during the performances and showing angles that could not be seen by spectators in the auditorium. This change in the visual aesthetics was part of a transition which made elaborately staged performances possible, bearing similarities to music videos and which went on to develop throughout the 1990s and into editions of the contest held during the twenty-first century.

== Format ==
Each participating broadcaster submitted one song, which was required to be no longer than three minutes in duration and performed in the language, or one of the languages, of the country which it represented. A maximum of six performers were allowed on stage during each country's performance. Each entry could utilise all or part of the live orchestra and could use instrumental-only backing tracks, however any backing tracks used could only include the sound of instruments featured on stage being mimed by the performers. The 1990 contest was the first to implement restrictions on the age of the performers, following criticism of the young age of the Israeli and French entrants in the previous year's contest, 12-year-old Gili Netanel and 11-year-old Nathalie Pâque respectively. For the 1990 event performers were required to be at least 16 years old in the year they competed in the event; although the United Kingdom had selected 15-year-old Emma as its representative, as she turned 16 later in the year she was still eligible to compete. The introduction of this rule, which was subsequently raised ahead of the 2027 contest to require artists to be at least 18 years old on the day of their first rehearsal, means that Sandra Kim, who won the contest for Belgium in 1986 at the age of 13, will hold the record of the youngest ever Eurovision winner in perpetuity, barring any further changes to the rule.

The results of the 1990 contest were determined through the same scoring system as had first been introduced in 1975: each country awarded twelve points to its favourite entry, followed by ten points to its second favourite, and then awarded points in decreasing value from eight to one for the remaining songs which featured in the country's top ten, with countries unable to vote for their own entry. The points awarded by each country were determined by an assembled jury of sixteen individuals, who were all required to be members of the public with no connection to the music industry, split evenly between men and women and by age. Each jury member voted in secret and awarded between one and ten votes to each participating song, excluding that from their own country and with no abstentions permitted. The votes of each member were collected following the country's performance and then tallied by the non-voting jury chairperson to determine the points to be awarded. In any cases where two or more songs in the top ten received the same number of votes, a show of hands by all jury members was used to determine the final placing.

== Contest overview ==
The contest took place on 5 May 1990 at 21:00 (CEST) with a duration of 2 hours and 47 minutes and was presented by Oliver Mlakar and Helga Vlahović.

The contest was opened with a pre-recorded film entitled Zagreb: City of Music, which showcased various locations in Zagreb and featured performances of various musical styles and genres. Another pre-recorded film featured during the interval between the competing entries and the voting sequence; entitled Yugoslav Changes, which highlighted the various cultures, landscapes, cuisines and industries within Yugoslavia. The trophy awarded to the winners was presented at the end of the broadcast by the contest's executive producer Goran Radman.

The contest's first entry suffered from a technical incident. The conductor of the Spanish entry was unable to hear the backing track, as the sound engineers had failed to raise the volume of the tape, and could not cue the orchestra to commence on time. When the volume was eventually raised the track was already partway through the song, meaning the orchestra and performers were out of sync with the tape, resulting in the two Salazar sisters of Azúcar Moreno leaving the stage as the backing tape continued to play. The tape was ultimately reset and the performance restarted with no further issues.

The winner was Italy represented by the song "Insieme: 1992", written and performed by Toto Cutugno. It was Italy's second win in the contest, following its first victory in 1964. At 46 years old Cutugno became the oldest Eurovision winner at that point. France achieved its first top 5 placing since 1981, placing equal second with Ireland, while Iceland's fourth place finish was the country's best ever result to that point. Spain also achieved its best finish since 1984, placing fifth. The 1990 contest marks the last time that the future "Big Five" countries all placed within the top 10: alongside Italy's first place, France's equal second place and Spain's fifth place finish, the United Kingdom placed sixth and Germany placed ninth.

Results of the Eurovision Song Contest 1990
R/O	Country	Artist	Song	Points	Place
1	Spain	Azúcar Moreno	"Bandido"	96	5
2	Greece	Christos Callow	"Horis skopo"	11	19
3	Belgium	Philippe Lafontaine	"Macédomienne"	46	12
4	Turkey	Kayahan	"Gözlerinin Hapsindeyim"	21	17
5	Netherlands	Maywood	"Ik wil alles met je delen"	25	15
6	Luxembourg	Céline Carzo	"Quand je te rêve"	38	13
7	United Kingdom	Emma	"Give a Little Love Back to the World"	87	6
8	Iceland	Stjórnin	"Eitt lag enn"	124	4
9	Norway	Ketil Stokkan	"Brandenburger Tor"	8	21
10	Israel	Rita	"Shara Barkhovot"	16	18
11	Denmark	Lonnie Devantier	"Hallo Hallo"	64	8
12	Switzerland	Egon Egemann	"Musik klingt in die Welt hinaus"	51	11
13	Germany	Chris Kempers and Daniel Kovac	"Frei zu leben"	60	9
14	France	Joëlle Ursull	"White and Black Blues"	132	2
15	Yugoslavia	Tajči	"Hajde da ludujemo"	81	7
16	Portugal	Nucha	"Há sempre alguém"	9	20
17	Ireland	Liam Reilly	"Somewhere in Europe"	132	2
18	Sweden	Edin-Ådahl	"Som en vind"	24	16
19	Italy	Toto Cutugno	"Insieme: 1992"	149	1
20	Austria	Simone	"Keine Mauern mehr"	58	10
21	Cyprus	Anastasiou	"Milas poli"	36	14
22	Finland	Beat	"Fri?"	8	21

=== Spokespersons ===
Each participating broadcaster appointed a spokesperson, connected to the contest venue via telephone lines and responsible for announcing, in English or French, the votes for its respective country. Known spokespersons at the 1990 contest are listed below.

- Cyprus – Anna Partelidou
- Finland – Solveig Herlin
- Ireland – Eileen Dunne
- Netherlands – Joop van Os
- Sweden – Jan Ellerås
- United Kingdom – Colin Berry

== Detailed voting results ==
Jury voting was used to determine the points awarded by all countries. The announcement of the results from each country was conducted in the order in which they performed, with the spokespersons announcing their country's points in English or French in ascending order. The detailed breakdown of the points awarded by each country is listed in the tables below.

Detailed voting results of the Eurovision Song Contest 1990
		Total score	Spain	Greece	Belgium	Turkey	Netherlands	Luxembourg	United Kingdom	Iceland	Norway	Israel	Denmark	Switzerland	Germany	France	Yugoslavia	Portugal	Ireland	Sweden	Italy	Austria	Cyprus	Finland
Contestants	Spain	96		8	1	10	2		1	4	5			6	**12**	5	3	5			8	8	8	10
Contestants	Greece	11					5																6	
Contestants	Belgium	46					7	4			1			4	8	8		2	1	7		4		
Contestants	Turkey	21					3			2	4				5		7							
Contestants	Netherlands	25		1		3		1	4			2		3		6		1			2		2	
Contestants	Luxembourg	38		4					3						3	**12**	2	3			1	5	5	
Contestants	United Kingdom	87	7	5	**12**			3				10	3	10	1	10	10		6		6	1	3	
Contestants	Iceland	124	4	3	10	1		8	**12**		10	8	10	7			4	**12**	7	8	3	10		7
Contestants	Norway	8										4	1						3					
Contestants	Israel	16					4							2	4		1							5
Contestants	Denmark	64	6		3	2				7	7	7		1				7	4	3	7	6	4	
Contestants	Switzerland	51	1	**12**		6		2					**12**			1	5	8					1	3
Contestants	Germany	60	8		6			**12**	7	1			4						10	4	5	3		
Contestants	France	132	5		4	4	**12**			**12**	**12**	6	5	**12**	10		**12**	4	8	5		2	7	**12**
Contestants	Yugoslavia	81	3			**12**			5	10	3	**12**	7			2			5	1	10		10	1
Contestants	Portugal	9						7	2															
Contestants	Ireland	132	10	7	7	5	10	6	10	8	8		8	5	7	7		6		**12**		**12**		4
Contestants	Sweden	24	2	2			6		6		6				2									
Contestants	Italy	**149**	**12**	10	8	8	8	10		3		1	6	8	6	4	6	10	**12**	10		7	**12**	8
Contestants	Austria	58			2	7	1	5	8	6						3	8		2	2	**12**			2
Contestants	Cyprus	36		6	5						2	5	2							6	4			6
Contestants	Finland	8								5		3												

=== 12 points ===
The below table summarises how the maximum 12 points were awarded from one country to another. The winning country is shown in bold. France received the maximum score of 12 points from six of the voting countries, with Italy receiving three sets of 12 points, Iceland, Ireland, Switzerland and Yugoslavia receiving two sets of maximum scores each, and Austria, Germany, Luxembourg, Spain and the United Kingdom each receiving one maximum score.

Distribution of 12 points awarded at the Eurovision Song Contest 1990
N.	Contestant	Nation(s) giving 12 points
6	France	Finland, Iceland, Netherlands, Norway, Switzerland, Yugoslavia
3	**Italy**	Cyprus, Ireland, Spain
2	Iceland	Portugal, United Kingdom
2	Ireland	Austria, Sweden
2	Switzerland	Denmark, Greece
2	Yugoslavia	Israel, Turkey
1	Austria	Italy
1	Germany	Luxembourg
1	Luxembourg	France
1	Spain	Germany
1	United Kingdom	Belgium

== Broadcasts ==
Each participating broadcaster was required to relay the contest via its networks. Non-participating member broadcasters were also able to relay the contest as "passive participants". Broadcasters were able to send commentators to provide coverage of the contest in their own native language and to relay information about the artists and songs to their television viewers. These commentators were typically sent to the venue to report on the event, and were able to provide commentary from small booths constructed at the back of the venue.

The contest was reportedly broadcast in 37 countries, with a number of non-participating broadcasting countries name-checked by Helga Vlahović during the event, specifically Australia, Bulgaria, Canada, China, Czechoslovakia, Hungary, Japan, Poland, Romania, South Korea, and the Soviet Union. The contest was also reportedly intended to be broadcast in Tunisia as well as other countries in Africa and South America. Reports at the time indicated that the estimated global audience could be as high as 600 million viewers, with Vlahović also mentioning that the contest could be seen by as many as one billion people.

Known details on the broadcasts in each country, including the specific broadcasting stations and commentators are shown in the tables below.

Broadcasters and commentators in participating countries
Country	Broadcaster	Channel(s)	Commentator(s)	Ref.
Austria	ORF	FS1	Barbara Stöckl	
Belgium	RTBF	RTBF1	Claude Delacroix	
Belgium	BRT	TV2	Luc Appermont	
Belgium	BRT	BRT 2		
Cyprus	CyBC	RIK	Neofytos Taliotis	
Cyprus	CyBC	A Programma		
Denmark	DR	DR TV	Jørgen de Mylius	
Denmark	DR	DR P3	Karlo Staunskær and Kurt Helge Andersen	
Finland	YLE	TV1	Erkki Pohjanheimo and Ossi Runne	
Finland	YLE	2-verkko		
France	Antenne 2		Richard Adaridi	
Germany	ARD	Erstes Deutsches Fernsehen	Fritz Egner	
Germany	SSVC	SSVC Television		
Greece	ERT	ET1		
Iceland	RÚV	Sjónvarpið, Rás 1	Arthúr Björgvin Bollason	
Ireland	RTÉ	RTÉ 1	Jimmy Greeley and Clíona Ní Bhuachalla	
Ireland	RTÉ	RTÉ Radio 1	Larry Gogan	
Israel	IBA	Israeli Television, Reshet Gimel		
Italy	RAI	Rai Due (Note: Deferred broadcast at 23:20 (CEST))	Peppi Franzelin	
Luxembourg	CLT	RTL Télévision (Note: Additional broadcast on Canal 21)	Valérie Sarn	
Netherlands	NOS	Nederland 3	Willem van Beusekom	
Norway	NRK	NRK Fjernsynet, NRK P2	Leif Erik Forberg	
Portugal	RTP	RTP Canal 1		
Spain	TVE	TVE 2	Luis Cobos	
Sweden	SVT	TV2	Jan Jingryd	
Sweden	RR	SR P3	Kersti Adams-Ray	
Switzerland	SRG SSR	SRG Sportkette	Bernard Thurnheer	
Switzerland	SRG SSR	SSR Chaîne Sportive		
Switzerland	SRG SSR	SSR Canale Sportivo		
Turkey	TRT	TV1	Başak Doğru	
United Kingdom	BBC	BBC1 (Note: Additional live broadcast on BBC TV Europe)	Terry Wogan	
United Kingdom	BBC	BBC Radio 2	Ken Bruce	
Yugoslavia	JRT	TV Beograd 1, Radio Beograd 1		
Yugoslavia	JRT	TV Novi Sad		
Yugoslavia	JRT	TV Ljubljana 1, Val 202		
Yugoslavia	JRT	TV Prishtina		
Yugoslavia	JRT	TV Zagreb 1, Radio Zagreb 1		

Broadcasters and commentators in non-participating countries
Country	Broadcaster	Channel(s)	Commentator(s)	Ref.
Australia	SBS	SBS TV (Note: Deferred broadcast the following day at 19:30 (AEST))		
Czechoslovakia	ČST	II. program (Note: Delayed broadcast on 28 May 1990 at 21:40 (CEST))		
Faroe Islands	SvF			
Greenland	KNR	KNR (Note: Delayed broadcast on 19 May 1990 at 21:35 (WGST))		
Hungary	MTV	MTV2		
Poland	TP	TP1 (Note: Delayed broadcast on 19 May 1990 at 20:05 (CEST))		
South Korea	KBS	KBS1 (Note: Delayed broadcast on 23 June 1990 at 19:10 (KST))		
Soviet Union	CT USSR	Programme One (Note: Also broadcast deferred via the Orbita satellite broadcasting system in the Soviet Far East)		
Soviet Union	ETV			

== Notes and references ==
=== Bibliography ===
- Knox, David Blake (2015). Ireland and the Eurovision: The Winners, the Losers and the Turkey. Stillorgan, Dublin, Ireland: New Island Books. ISBN 978-1-84840-429-8.
- Murtomäki, Asko (2007). Finland 12 points! Suomen Euroviisut (in Finnish). Helsinki, Finland: Teos. ISBN 951-851-106-3.
- O'Connor, John Kennedy (2010). The Eurovision Song Contest: The Official History (2nd ed.). London, United Kingdom: Carlton Books. ISBN 978-1-84732-521-1.
- Pajala, Mari (2022). "The Eurovision Song Contest and European television history: continuity, adaption, experimentation". In Dubin, Adam; Vuletic, Dean; Obregón, Antonio (eds.). The Eurovision Song Contest as a Cultural Phenomenon: from Concert Halls to the Halls of Academia. Abingdon-on-Thames, United Kingdom; New York, NY, United States: Routledge. pp. 188–200. doi:10.4324/9781003188933-16. ISBN 978-1-032-03774-5. OCLC 1296690839.
- Pérez-Rufí, José Patricio; Valverde-Maestre, Águeda María (2020). "The spatial-temporal fragmentation of live television video clips: analysis of the television production of the Eurovision Song Contest". Communication & Society. 33 (2): 17–31. doi:10.15581/003.33.2.17-31. hdl:10171/62357. ISSN 0214-0039.
- Roxburgh, Gordon (2016). Songs for Europe: The United Kingdom at the Eurovision Song Contest. Vol. Three: The 1980s. Prestatyn, United Kingdom: Telos Publishing. ISBN 978-1-84583-118-9.
- Roxburgh, Gordon (2020). Songs for Europe: The United Kingdom at the Eurovision Song Contest. Vol. Four: The 1990s. Prestatyn, United Kingdom: Telos Publishing. ISBN 978-1-84583-163-9.
- Thorsson, Leif; Verhage, Martin (2006). Melodifestivalen genom tiderna : de svenska uttagningarna och internationella finalerna [Melodifestivalen through the ages: the Swedish selections and international finals] (in Swedish). Stockholm, Sweden: Premium Publishing. ISBN 91-89136-29-2.
- West, Chris (2020). Eurovision! A History of Modern Europe Through the World's Greatest Song Contest (2nd ed.). London, United Kingdom: Melville House UK. ISBN 978-1-911545-55-2.
