= Insieme: 1992 =

1990 song by Toto Cutugno

Single by Toto Cutugno
- Language: Italian
- B-side: "Instrumental"
- Released: 1990
- Recorded: 1990
- Genre: Pop
- Length: 4:00
- Label: EMI
- Songwriter: Salvatore Cutugno
- Producer: Number Two

Toto Cutugno singles chronology
"Gli amori" (1990)	"Insieme: 1992" (1990)	"Che sera" (1992)

Eurovision Song Contest 1990 entry
- Country: Italy
- Artist: Salvatore Cutugno
- As: Toto Cutugno
- With: Pepel in kri
- Language: Italian
- Composer: Salvatore Cutugno
- Lyricist: Salvatore Cutugno
- Conductor: Gianni Madonini

Finals performance
- Final result: 1st
- Final points: 149

Entry chronology
- ◄ "Avrei voluto" (1989)
- "Comme è ddoce 'o mare" (1991) ►

Official performance video
- "Insieme: 1992" on YouTube

"Insieme: 1992" (Italian pronunciation: [inˈsjɛːme ˌmilleˌnɔveˈtʃɛnto noˌvantaˈduːe]; "Together: 1992") is a song written and recorded by Toto Cutugno. It represented Italy in the Eurovision Song Contest 1990, held in Zagreb, resulting in the country's second victory in the contest.

== Background ==
=== Conception ===
"Insieme: 1992" was written and recorded by Toto Cutugno with Italian lyrics. He sang about bringing the disparate nations of Europe together. The "1992" of the title refers to the year in which the European Union was scheduled to begin operation, thus bringing the hope of the lyric to fruition.

=== Eurovision ===
Radiotelevisione italiana (RAI) internally selected the song as its entrant for the 35th edition of the Eurovision Song Contest. For the song to participate in the contest, it was necessary to shorten it to fit into three minutes.

On 5 May 1990, the Eurovision Song Contest was held at the Vatroslav Lisinski Concert Hall in Zagreb hosted by Radiotelevizija Zagreb on behalf of Jugoslavenska radiotelevizija (JRT), and broadcast live throughout the continent. Cutugno performed "Insieme: 1992" nineteenth on the evening, following Sweden's "Som en vind" by Edin-Ådahl and preceding Austria's "Keine Mauern mehr" by Simone. He was accompanied on stage by a backing group of five singers from Slovenia, the group Pepel in kri –Zvezdana Sterle, Ditka Haberl, Tadej Hrušovar "Dejvi", Oliver Antauer, and Miran Rudan–, who had represented Yugoslavia in 1975. Gianni Madonini conducted the event's orchestra in the performance of the Italian entry.

At the close of voting, the song had received 149 points, placing first in a field of twenty-two, winning the contest. This was Italy's second victory in the contest.

==== Live arrangement ====
As Slovenian backup singer Tadej Hrušovar remembers: "The first rehearsal was a total disaster, that's why I offered to re-arrange the song by myself. Cutugno told us (backup singers) 'Let's just get over with it, nothing good will come out of this.' We rehearsed backvocals kicking intro 'Insieme, unite, unite, Europe' really poorly for quite some time. Delegations from other countries looked at us really strangely and I was really embarrassed. I had enough and told Cutugno, 'That's it, I will do an appropriate rearrangment of the song all by myself. We can't just fool around, our band (Pepel in kri) has a great reputation in Yugoslavia.' So I did correct the arrangement and studied it with the other band members. After two days we had the second rehearsal and when we 'hit' that kick intro, Cutugno turned around with his mouth open, couldn't believe how powerful it sounded. Then panic also started among the rest of the delegations, who didn't take us seriously before. Then suddenly they started coming up to us, asking who we were."

=== Aftermath ===
As the winning broadcaster, the European Broadcasting Union (EBU) gave RAI the responsibility to host the following edition of the Eurovision Song Contest. This contest, held on 4 May 1991, opened with its hosts, Cutugno and Gigliola Cinquetti, performing their Eurovision winning songs, "Insieme: 1992" and "Non ho l'età" respectively.

== Track listings ==
CD single

1. "Insieme: 1992" – 4:00
2. "Insieme: 1992" (instrumental) – 4:00

7" single

1. "Insieme: 1992" – 4:00
2. "Insieme: 1992" (instrumental) – 4:00

== Charts ==
=== Weekly charts ===
Chart (1990)	Peak position
Austria (Ö3 Austria Top 40)	3
Belgium (Ultratop 50 Flanders)	8
Europe (Eurochart Hot 100)	19
Finland (Suomen virallinen lista)	25
France (SNEP)	9
Italy (Musica e dischi)	14
Italy Airplay (Music & Media)	13
Netherlands (Dutch Top 40)	18
Netherlands (Single Top 100)	15
Portugal (UNEVA)	2
Switzerland (Schweizer Hitparade)	2
West Germany (GfK)	13

=== Year-end charts ===
Chart (1990)	Position
Austria (Ö3 Austria Top 40)	14
Belgium (Ultratop)	84
Europe (Eurochart Hot 100)	44
Germany (Media Control)	58
Switzerland (Schweizer Hitparade)	14

=== Certifications ===
Region	Certification	Certified units/sales
France (SNEP)	Silver	200,000^{*}
Switzerland (IFPI Switzerland)	Gold	25,000^{^}
^{*} Sales figures based on certification alone.^{^} Shipments figures based on certification alone.

== Legacy ==
=== Covers ===
- In 1990 Kari Tapio recorded the song in Finnish titled "Lapset suomenmaan" ("Children of the country of Finland").
- In 1990 Slovenian vocal band Pepel in kri, who also performed as Cotugno's backvocals, did Slovenian version called "Evropa '92"
- Turkish pop singer, Yasemin Kumral covered it as Birlikte ("Together" in Turkish) in her 1990 album, Uzaylı Dostum (My alien friend in Turkish).
- In 1998, Roland Kaiser recorded a German version "Extreme".

Preceded by "Rock Me" by Riva	Eurovision Song Contest winners 1990	Succeeded by "Fångad av en stormvind" by Carola
