= White and Black Blues =

1990 song by Joëlle Ursull

Single by Joëlle Ursull

from the album Black French
- Language: French
- B-side: "Instrumental"
- Released: 1990
- Recorded: 1990, France
- Genre: Pop
- Length: 3:00
- Label: CBS
- Composer: Georges Augier de Moussac
- Lyricist: Serge Gainsbourg
- Producer: Serge Gainsbourg

Joëlle Ursull singles chronology
"White and Black Blues" (1990)	"Amazone" (1990)

Eurovision Song Contest 1990 entry
- Country: France
- Artist: Joëlle Ursull
- Language: French
- Composer: Georges Augier de Moussac
- Lyricist: Serge Gainsbourg
- Conductor: Régis Dupré

Finals performance
- Final result: 2nd
- Final points: 132

Entry chronology
- ◄ "J'ai volé la vie" (1989)
- "C'est le dernier qui a parlé qui a raison" (1991) ►

Official performance video
- "White and Black Blues" on YouTube

"White and Black Blues" is a song recorded by French singer Joëlle Ursull, with music composed by Georges Augier de Moussac and French lyrics (with some words in English) written by Serge Gainsbourg. It represented France in the Eurovision Song Contest 1990 held in Zagreb, placing second. It is the first single from her album Black French and has become something of a fan favourite.

== Background ==
=== Conception ===
Composed by Georges Augier de Moussac with lyrics by Serge Gainsbourg, "White and Black Blues" was originally titled "Black Lolita Blues", however Joëlle Ursull declined to perform it due to the pejorative connotations of the word "Lolita". The rewritten version met with her approval.

Gainsbourg, had previously composed France Gall's winning entry for Luxembourg in 1965, "Poupée de cire, poupée de son", as well as the Monegasque entry "Boum-Badaboum" for Minouche Barelli in 1967, which had finished fifth (and he had also composed "Comme un boomerang" for Dani to enter the 1975 Eurovision, but the song was rejected as some of its lyrics were deemed too violent; that song was released by Dani in 2001, 26 years later, as a duet with Étienne Daho, and was a major success in France that year).

"White and Black Blues" itself deals with the need to overcome the prejudices of skin colour. Ursull sings, "when someone talks to me about skin colour / I have the blues which sends shivers down my spine / I feel as if I'm in a tale by Edgar Allan Poe". That said, she does not believe in relinquishing her connection to Africa entirely ("Africa, my love, I have you in my skin"), but admits that she faces difficulties in a white society ("we, the blacks / we're a few millions, a dime a dozen").

Musically, it features an accordion as well as the synthesiser effects starting to appear in the early 1990s. The song is in triple metre, with the verses following an unusual phrasing of seven triplets per phrase, and the chorus with a more conventional eight triplets per phrase.

=== Eurovision ===
Antenne 2 internally selected "White and Black Blues" as its entrant for the 35th edition of the Eurovision Song Contest. Ursull became the first black woman to represent France at Eurovision.

On 5 May 1990, the Eurovision Song Contest was held at the Vatroslav Lisinski Concert Hall in Zagreb hosted by Radiotelevizija Zagreb on behalf of Jugoslavenska radiotelevizija (JRT), and broadcast live throughout the continent. Ursull performed "White and Black Blues" fourteenth on the evening. Régis Dupré conducted the event's orchestra in the performance of the French entry.

At the close of voting, the song had received 132 points, tying for second place with "Somewhere in Europe" by Liam Reilly that represented Ireland, in a field of twenty-two. It was succeeded as French representative at the 1991 contest by Amina with "Le Dernier qui a parlé...".

== Chart performance ==
"White and Black Blues" had a great success in France and was one of the summer hits of 1990. It debuted at number 47 on 26 May 1990 and reached number two seven weeks later, but was unable to top the chart, as Zouk Machine, Ursull's former band, was then number one with "Maldòn". The single remained in the top ten for 18 weeks and left the top 50 after 26 weeks of presence, and was certified Gold disc by the Syndicat National de l'Édition Phonographique. In Sweden and Germany, the single achieved a minor success, peaking respectively at number 19 and number 86. It was also a top ten hit in Austria.

On the Eurochart Hot 100, "White and Black Blues" debuted at number 76 on 16 June 1990, peaked at number nine in its seventh week, and totalled ten weeks in the top twenty and 23 weeks on the chart. It ranked number 30 on the European year-end chart. It was also much aired on radio, spending 12 weeks on the European Airplay Top 50 Chart with a peak at number 11 in its fourth week, and was number two on French both AM and PM airplay charts on 28 July 1990.

== Track listings ==
- CD single
1. "White and Black Blues" — 3:00
2. "White and Black Blues" (instrumental) — 3:00
- 7" single
1. "White and Black Blues" — 3:00
2. "White and Black Blues" (instrumental) — 3:00

== Charts ==
=== Weekly charts ===
Chart (1990)	Peak position
Austria (Ö3 Austria Top 40)	10
Belgium (Ultratop 40 Wallonia)	7
Europe (European Airplay Top 50)	11
Europe (European Hot 100)	9
France (SNEP)	2
Sweden (Sverigetopplistan)	19
West Germany (GfK)	86

=== Year-end charts ===
Chart (1990)	Position
Europe (Eurochart Hot 100)	30
Europe (European Airplay Top 50)	41

== Certifications ==
Region	Certification	Certified units/sales
France (SNEP)	Gold	400,000^{*}
^{*} Sales figures based on certification alone.
