= Birte =

Birte is a feminine given name which may refer to:

- Birte Bruhns (born 1970), German retired middle-distance runner
- Birte Christoffersen (1924–2026), Danish-Swedish diver
- Birte Glang (born 1980), German actress, brand ambassador, fashion model and lawyer
- Birte Glißmann (born 1992), German politician
- Birte Høeg Brask (1918–1997), Danish resistance fighter and physician
- Birte Melsen (born 1939), Danish orthodontist
- Birte Ove-Petersen (fl. 1938), Danish swimmer
- Birte Sandberg (born 1965), Swedish politician
- Birte Siech (born 1967), German rower
- Birte Siim (born 1945), Danish political scientist specializing in gender studies
- Birte Tove (1945–2016), Danish actress and nude model
- Birte Weigang (born 1968), East German former swimmer
- Birte Weiss (born 1941), Danish journalist and politician
- Birte Weiß (born 1971), German footballer

== See also ==
- Birt, a surname
