= Birthe =

Birthe is a feminine given name. Notable people with the name include:

- Birthe Hegstad (born 1966), Norwegian footballer, scored the decisive goal in the 1993 European Championship final.
- Birthe Kjær (born 1948), Danish singer, winner of the Dansk Melodi Grand Prix 1989, placed third at Eurovision.
- Birthe Neumann (born 1947), Danish actress, known for roles in The Celebration and other Dogme films.
- Birthe Nielsen (1926–2010), Danish sprinter
- Birthe Olufsdatter (died 1620), Danish woman executed for witchcraft, a notable case in Danish witch trials.
- Birthe Wesselhøft (1934–2025), Danish-Swedish artist
- Birthe Wilke (born 1936), Danish singer, participant in the Eurovision Song Contest in 1957 and 1959.
- Birthe Wolter (born 1981), German actress, known for the TV series Schulmädchen.

== See also ==
- Birgitta
- Birgit
- Birte
