= Birt =

Birt is a surname. Notable people with the surname include:

- Charlie Birt (born 1942), Canadian politician
- Clinker Birt (1890–1948), Australian rugby union player
- Daniel Birt (1907–1955), English film director and editor
- Diane F. Birt (born 1949), American nutritionist
- Eithne Birt, Baroness Birt (born 1952), British probation officer
- Francis Bradley Bradley-Birt (1874–1963), British diplomat and writer
- Fred Birt (1886–1956), Welsh rugby union player
- Ilie Birt (1698–1786), Romanian merchant
- Jill Birt (fl. from 1983), keyboardist in Australian band The Triffids
- John Birt (footballer) (born 1937)
- John Birt (politician) (1873–1925), Australian politician
- John Birt, Baron Birt (born 1944), Director-General of the British Broadcasting Corporation 1992–2000
- Michael Birt (barrister) (born 1948), lawyer and Bailiff of Jersey in the Channel Islands
- Michael Birt (biochemist) (1932–2001), Australian academician
- Lady Norah Bradley-Birt (1875–1946), English educationalist
- Peter Birt (c. 1723–1791), English businessman
- Raymond Birt (1911–2002), English cleric, Archdeacon of Berkshire
- Suzanne Birt (born 1981), Canadian curler
- Theodor Birt (1852–1933), German classicist and novelist
- Travis Birt (born 1981), Australian cricketer
- William Radcliffe Birt (1804–1881), British astronomer
