= Theodor Birt =

German classicist

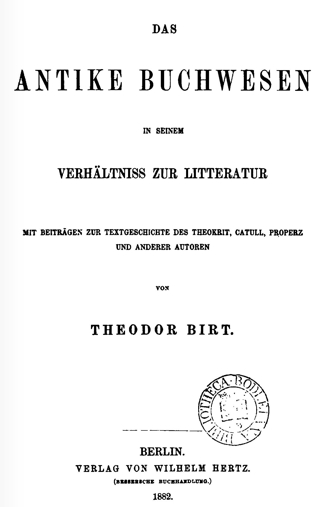
- Title page from Theodor Birts The Nature of the Ancient Book
- Born: Theodor Birt; 22 March 1852; Wandsbek, Germany
- Died: 28 January 1933 (aged 80); Marburg, Germany
- Other names: Beatus Rhenanus
- Occupations: classicist, historian of the book, novelist

Theodor Birt (22 March 1852 in Wandsbek – 28 January 1933 in Marburg) was a German classicist and novelist. He also used the name of the Humanist Beatus Rhenanus as a pseudonym.

== Life ==
Birt's ancestors came from Pennsylvania and had been settled in Germany for three generations. Birt's father intended for him to become a shopkeeper but allowed his musically talented son to attend the Gelehrtenschule des Johanneums, a gymnasium in Hamburg, for three years where Johannes Classen and Adolf Kiessling were his teachers. From 1872, Birt studied classics, at first for a year in Leipzig, and then (1873–76) in Bonn under Hermann Usener and Franz Bücheler. From the time he completed his studies (from his 'Habilitation,' 1878) he remained at the University of Marburg. He became a full professor ('Ordinarius') in 1886, and taught until 1921. In 1902–1903 he was the rector of the university.

Apart from his scholarly research, he became well-known to a wider public after 1913 for a large number of works that aimed to popularize scholarship on ancient Greece and Rome. He later published fiction and literary works (short stories, historical novels, plays, and poems). His collection of biographical sketches of famous Romans remains in print today.

He belonged to academic societies: the classical studies section of the Philologisch-Historischen Vereins and later to the scholarly Verbindung Hercynia.

== History of the ancient book ==
Birt was a pioneering and influential historian of the ancient book in Greece and Rome. His 1882 The Nature of the Ancient Book and his 1901 The Book Scroll in Ancient Art are representative of nineteenth century German classical scholarship at its best and are still widely cited. For example, in their 1987 book The Birth of the Codex, Roberts and Skeat criticized some of Birt's interpretations but added:

'Any worker in this field must begin by expressing his obligations to Theodor Birt's The Nature of the Ancient Book ... As a collection of the literary material Birt's work is indispensable and calls for few supplements ...'

The early reception of Birt's work is reflected in a review of his work on ancient depictions of reading and book scrolls by C. B. Gulick (Harvard University):

Just twenty-five years have elapsed between the appearance of Theodor Birt's The Nature of the Ancient Book and the present work. Although, perhaps, it is less important in scope and subject-matter than the earlier book, this elaborate study of the scroll as it appears in art is a useful contribution, exhibiting the same qualities of untiring search for all possible material bearing on the theme, fresh judgments on that material, careful exposition of fact, often enlivened by a pertinent comparison with modern practice, and a genius for classification which in combined comprehensiveness and attention to detail is admirable, even for a German.

Birt summarized his many publications on Greek philology and on the ancient book in his 1913 book Kritik and Hermeneutic.

Birt's work played an important role in reshaping historical research on the ancient book. From the time of Bernard de Montfaucon (1655 –1741), the field was dominated by palaeography, which married an interest in tracing the evolution in Greek and Latin handwriting through the centuries with techniques for deciphering, annotating, and amending manuscripts. As important as this was for interpreting the books recovered during the Renaissance, the narrow focus on writing and grammar gave only a limited view of the central medium for organizing and communicating knowledge and literary art. Birt turned the field toward the broader social, economic, and intellectual roles of the ancient book.

Birt's innovations were stimulated by discoveries in the preceding decade. Many medieval copies of ancient texts end with short notes that contain numerals. In 1873, Charles Graux correctly interpreted these as measures of the length of each work. Just as moderns measure the size of their books in pages, ancient Greeks and Romans counted the number of 'standard lines' in their books (each as long as a line in Homer's poems). Before his premature death, Graux together with Martin Schanz and other scholars launched the modern study of the spatial organization of ancient books, which is now called stichometry. Birt saw that the breakthrough in understanding the practice of line-counting led to a cascade of insights about the way ancient publishers paid ancient scribes (by the line), about the way ancient authors cited each other's works (by the line), and about the kinds of formats and editions used in antiquity. As Hermann Alexander Diels said,

The investigations of the recently deceased Charles Graux, taken all too early from the world of scholarship, have made it henceforth inalterably certain that the standard line (the stichos) of the ancients was a unit of spatial length equal to the hexameter. Theodor Birt has rightly erected his shrewd and persuasive The Nature of the Ancient Book upon this foundation.

Birt's 550-page work was stimulated by these practical questions about the ancient culture of books but grew into a broad reevaluation and reorganization of our knowledge of ancient literature and intellectual life. His introduction argued:

The nature of the literature of antiquity and the form of the ancient book reciprocally conditioned each other. The context of publication enveloped and modified literary creativity. The dividends of these investigations will thereby far exceed the satisfaction of merely antiquarian pleasures.

Many of Birt's theories and interpretations are dated and have been superseded by later research, but he permanently broadened and deepened the methodologies used in histories of the ancient book.

== Neo-Kantianism in Marburg ==
When Birt was a professor in classics at Marburg University, its philosophy department was among the most important in Europe. Hermann Cohen and Paul Natorp there developed what came to be known as neo-Kantianism. As the name suggests, this aimed to develop Kant's philosophy and apply it to a wide range of contemporary issues. In addition to Cohen and Natorp, Marburg's philosophy department was home during Birt's career to such important figures as Martin Heidegger, Hannah Arendt, Paul Friedlander, Ernst Cassirer, and José Ortega y Gasset. Birt contributed a section to one of Natorp's books, who thanked him as a 'great friend and colleague.' A letter from Kurt Wolff, who became a well-known German publisher, to the writer Boris Pasternak shows that Birt and the philosophers were part of the same social circle:

I was a student in Marburg about a year before your time and spent an unforgettable semester reading Plato in Cohen's seminar ... What pleasure it would give me to talk about Cohen, Natorp, and the others with you! (Perhaps you remember Theodor Birt, the professor of Latin, Johannes Weiss, the theologian and excellent pianist, Jenner, the musicologist who was also a student of Brahms, the Germanist Professor Vogt, and Elster.) I was on friendly terms with all of them ... because I always took my cello along when I went to call on them... They were all musical and making music in their homes was an integral part of their lives.

Methodologically, Birt's The Nature of the Ancient Book is notable for its characteristic mixture of rigorous classical scholarship and neo-Kantian concerns with space and time, as can be seen in passages like:

The logos is as non-spatial as music, and has its extension only in time. Before writing, our collective memory entrusted its survival to song, to Homer and the ancient rhapsodes. When writing first came, it was nothing more than a crutch for our memory. In itself, the written word is not more than sound and thought crystallized into space, and streams out into time again as soon as it touches the reader’s eye.

== Publications ==
=== Scholarly works ===
- 1882: Das antike Buchwesen in seinem Verhältnis zur Literatur. Hertz, Berlin. - Nachdruck Scientia, Aalen 1959 und 1974
- 1892: Claudianus, Claudius: Carmina Recensuit Theodorus Birt. Weidmann, Berlin (Monumenta Germaniae historica, Auctores antiquissimi 10). - Nachdruck Weidmann, Berlin 1981 und MGH München 1981
- 1907 Die Buchrolle in der Kunst. Teubner, Leipzig 1907. - Nachdruck Olms, Hildesheim 1976
- 1913: Kritik und Hermeneutik. Nebst Abriss des antiken Buchwesens. Beck, München. 3. Aufl. (Handbuch der klassischen Altertumswissenschaft I, 3)

=== Popular literature ===
- 1894: Eine römische Litteraturgeschichte in 5 Stunden gesprochen. Elwert, Marburg. - 2. Aufl. ( in 5 Vorträgen) 1909
- 1909: Zur Kulturgeschichte Roms : gesammelte Skizzen. Quelle & Meyer, Leipzig. - 5. Aufl. 1935
- 1913: Römische Charakterköpfe, Ein Weltbild in Biographien. Quelle & Meyer, Leipzig. - 9. Aufl. 1932. 36.-40. Tsd. 1954
- 1916: Schiller, der Politiker, im Licht unserer großen Gegenwart. Cotta, Stuttgart. - 2.-5. Tsd. 1916
- 1917: Die Germanen. Eine Erklärung der Überlieferung über Bedeutung und Herkunft des Völkernamens. Beck, München
- 1918: Aus dem Leben der Antike. Quelle & Meyer, Leipzig. - 4. Aufl. 1925
- 1918: Sokrates, der Athener. Quelle & Meyer, Leipzig
- 1919: Charakterbilder Spätroms und die Entstehung des modernen Europa. Quelle & Meyer, Leipzig. - 5. Aufl. 1930
- 1919: Von Homer bis Sokrates. Ein Buch über die alten Griechen. Quelle & Meyer, Leipzig.- 4. Aufl. 1928
- 1922: Die Cynthia des Properz. Quelle & Meyer, Leipzig.
- 1924: Alexander der Große und das Weltgriechentum bis zum Erscheinen Jesu. Quelle & Meyer, Leipzig. 1924
- 1925: Horaz' Lieder : Studien zur Kritik und Auslegung. Quelle & Meyer, Leipzig, 2 Bände
- 1928: Das Kulturleben der Griechen und Römer in seiner Entwicklung. Quelle & Meyer, Leipzig
- 1931: Die Schaubauten der Griechen und die attische Tragödie. Gesellschaft für Theatergeschichte, Berlin
- 1932: Frauen der Antike. Quelle & Meyer, Leipzig
- 1941: Das römische Weltreich [Römische Charakterköpfe u. Charakterbilder Spätroms] Knaur, Berlin

=== Autobiographical ===
- 1910: Aus der Provence. Reiseskizzen. Deutsche Bücherei [Reihe], Leipzig. Nachdr. Rüsch, Großenwörden 1927
- 1922: Griechische Erinnerungen. Ein Reisebuch. Elwert, Marburg
- 1927: Marburger Licht- und Schattenbilder. Erinnerungen. Elwert, Marburg
- 1929: Wie ich lernte. Hamburger Erinnerungen und Stimmungsbilder aus den Jahren 1813 bis 1872. Quelle & Meyer, Leipzig

=== Fiction and literary works ===
- 1886: Attarachus und Valeria. Eine lyrische Erzählung von Beatus Rhenanus. Grunow, Leipzig
- 1895: König Agis. Eine Tragödie des Beatus Rhenanus in 5 Akten. Elwert, Marburg
- 1908: Artiges und Unartiges. Gedichte des Beatus Rhenanus. Elwert, Marburg. - 2. Aufl. 1924
- 1916: Novellen und Legenden aus verklungenen Zeiten. Quelle & Meyer, Leipzig. - 4. Aufl. 1928
- 1911: Menedem. Die Geschichte eines Ungläubigen. Cotta, Stuttgart. - 2. u. 3. Tsd. 1921
- 1919: Von Hass und Liebe : 5 Erzählungen aus verklungenen Zeiten. Quelle & Meyer, Leipzig
- 1922: Helle und dunkle Klänge in Gedichten. Quelle & Meyer, Leipzig
- 1923: Neue Novellen und Legenden aus verklungenen Zeiten. Quelle & Meyer, Leipzig
- 1923: Moderne Novellen. Quelle & Meyer, Leipzig
- 1927: Roxane: Ein Alexanderroman in 10 Handlungen. Quelle & Meyer, Leipzig
- 1930: Rätsel und Silbenspiele. Elwert, Marburg
- 1931: König wider Willen. - Achill. 2 Novellen. Quelle & Meyer, Leipzig

== See also ==
- Franz Gundlach: Catalogus professorum academiae Marburgensis, 1527–1910. Marburg 1927, p. 340.
- Inge Auerbach: Catalogus professorum academiae Marburgensis. Zweiter Band: 1910 bis 1971. Marburg 1979, p. 467.
- Hermann Bengtson: Birt, Theodor. In: Neue Deutsche Biographie (NDB). Band 2, Duncker & Humblot, Berlin 1955, ISBN 3-428-00183-4, p. 260 ff. (Digitalized).
- Eckart Mensching: Nugae zur Philologie-Geschichte, 9 (1996), pp. 9–66.
