= Stichometry =

Practice of counting lines in texts

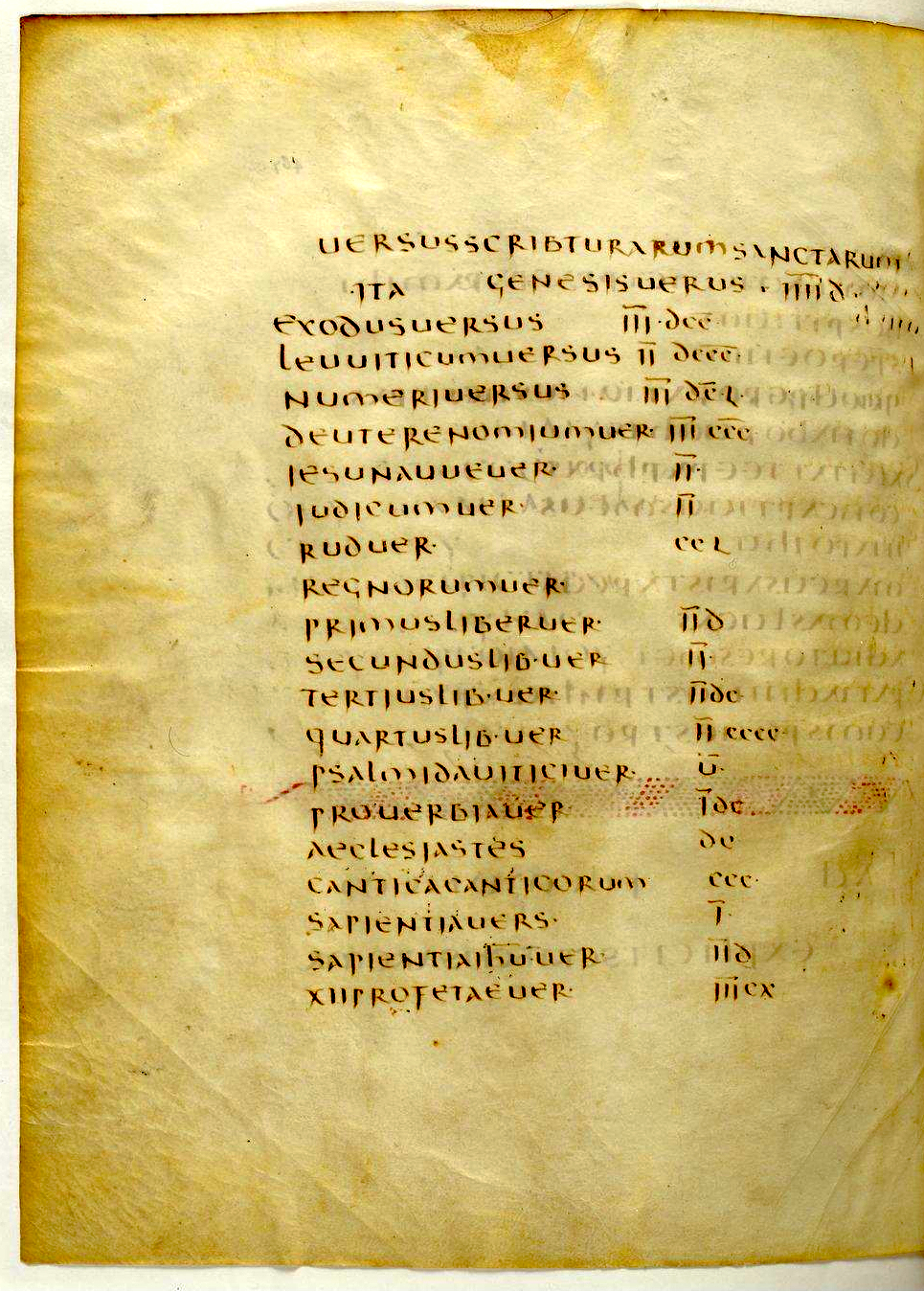
A List of Total Line Counts for Christian Texts: The title is 'Versus Scribturarum Sanctarum' or 'Lines of Holy Scriptures.' The second line says 'Genesis Versus IIIId' or 'Genesis Lines 4500.' The third line says 'Exodus Versus IIIdcc (= 3700). From the Codex Claromontanus (5th or 6th century AD), Leaf 467v, National Library, Paris, France.

Stichometry is the practice of counting lines in texts: Ancient Greeks and Romans measured the length of their books in lines, just as modern books are measured in pages. This practice was rediscovered by German and French scholars in the 19th century. Stichos (pl. stichoi) is the Greek word for a 'line' of prose or poetry and the suffix '-metry' is derived from the Greek word for measurement.

The length of each line in the Iliad and Odyssey, which may have been among the first long, Greek texts written down, became the standard unit for ancient stichometry. This standard line (Normalzeile, in German) was thus as long as an epic hexameter and contained about 15 syllables or 35 Greek letters.

Stichometry existed for several reasons. Scribes were paid by the line and their fee per line was sometimes fixed by legal decree. Authors occasionally cited passages in the works of other authors by giving their approximate line number. Book buyers used total line counts to check that copied texts were complete. Library catalogs listed the total number of lines in each work along with the title and author.

Scholars believe that stichometry became established in Athens sometime during the 5th century BC when copying prose works became common. Stichometry is mentioned briefly in Plato's Laws (c. 347 BC), several times in Isocrates (early to mid-4th century), and in Theopompus (late 4th to early 3rd century), but these casual references suggest the practice was already routine. The same standard line was used for stichometry among the Greeks and Romans for about a thousand years until stichometry apparently fell out of use among the Byzantine Greeks in the Middle Ages as page numbers became more common.

The standard work on stichometry is Kurt Ohly's 1928 Stichometrische Untersuchungen, which collects together the results of some fifty years of scholarly debate and research. Today, stichometry plays a small but useful role in research in fields as diverse as the history of the ancient book, papyrology, and Christian hermeneutics.

== Definitions ==
There are two kinds of stichometry: total stichometry is the practice of reporting the total number of lines in a work. Partial stichometry is the practice of including a series of numerals in the margins of a text, usually to mark every hundredth line.

Stichometry was sometimes confused with colometry, the practice of some Christian authors in late antiquity of writing texts broken into rhetorical phrases to aid delivery. Some modern Jewish and Christian scholars use ‘stichometry’ as a synonym for stichography, which is the occasional practice in ancient scriptures of laying out texts so that each biblical or poetic verse begins on a new line.

== Evidence for stichometry ==
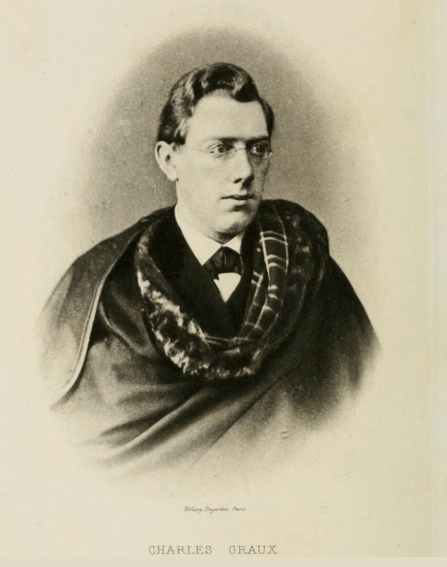
Charles Graux (1852--1882): French classicist and palaeographer. His discovery of the standard line launched the rigorous, modern study of stichometry.

The libraries of Europe contain many medieval copies of ancient Greek and Latin texts. Many of these contain short notes or 'subscriptions' on the final page that, in hundreds of cases, give the total number of lines in the work. In texts of classical authors such as Herodotus and Demosthenes, these totals are expressed in the older, acrophonic numerals that were used in Athens during the classical period but abandoned sometime during the Hellenistic period. Thus these stichometric totals are thought to descend, along with the content of the texts, from very early editions.

Many ancient authors mention stichometry. Galen complains about the verbosity of a rival and says he can offer a description in fewer lines. In the 1st century BC, a philosopher criticized Zeno of Citium and cited particular passages by giving their line number to the nearest hundredth line. Diogenes Laërtius probably draws on the Pinakes, the published catalogue of the Library of Alexandria, when he reports the total number of lines in the oeuvres of various authors. He says, for example, that Speusippus wrote 43,475, Aristotle wrote 445,270, and Theophrastus wrote 232,808 lines. The Cheltenham Canon lists line totals for books in the Christian Bible and concludes with an anonymous note apparently written by a book dealer in the 4th century AD when the practice of stichometry was perhaps becoming less familiar:

Since the list of line totals [of the books in the Bible available] in the city of Rome is not reliable, and elsewhere because of greed is not complete, I have gone through each individual book, counting 16 syllables to the line (as used in Virgil), and recorded the number for each book in all of them.

Beginning in the 19th century, archaeologists discovered a large number of more or less fragmentary Greek scrolls in Egypt. Ohly describes and analyzes some fifty papyri which provide direct, ancient evidence for total and partial stichometry.

== Modern rediscovery ==
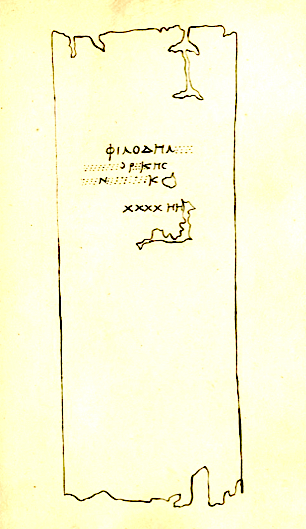
Total Stichometry on a Papyrus Column: A line count in the subscription on the last column of a text by the philosopher Philodemus (1st century BC). The first line says 'ΦΙΛΟΔΗΜ[ΟΥ]' or 'By Philodemus' (brackets around restored characters). The second says '[ΠΕΡΙ ΡΗΤ]ΟΡΙΚΗϹ' or 'On Rhetoric.' The last says 'XXXXHH' or '4200 [lines] (written with attic numerals).' Transcription of papyrus charred by the eruption of Vesuvius in AD 79 and excavated at Herculaneum (Oxford, 1824).

Friedrich Ritschl, a leading German classicist in the mid-19th century, stimulated interest in the mysterious numerals found at the end of medieval manuscripts by discussing them in several of his essays.

In an 1878 article that Ohly called ‘epoch-making,’ Charles Graux proved that the numerals at the end of the medieval manuscripts were proportional to the length of each work and in fact gave the total number of a fixed unit equal to a Homeric line. This discovery established the concept of the standard line.

While studying the Clarke Codex of Plato's dialogues at Oxford, Martin Schanz noticed that isolated letters in the margins of two dialogues formed an alphabetic series and marked every hundredth standard line (alpha = 100, beta = 200, etc.). He was able to show that other manuscripts had similar marginal markings. His 1881 article named this kind of line-counting 'partial stichometry' and contrasted it to 'total stichometry' studied by Graux.

Theodor Birt's well-known The Nature of the Ancient Book (1882) substantially widened research on stichometry. Birt saw that Graux's breakthrough led to a cascade of insights about scribal practices and publishing, citations and intertextuality, and the kinds of formats and editions used in antiquity. Stichometry thus led to a broader study of the spatial organization of ancient books and their social, economic, and intellectual roles. As Hermann Diels said,

The investigations of the recently deceased Charles Graux, taken all too prematurely from the world of scholarship, have made it henceforth inalterably certain that the standard line (the stichos) of the ancients was a unit of spatial length equal to the hexameter. Theodor Birt has rightly erected his shrewd and persuasive The Nature of the Ancient Book upon this foundation.

Birt's 550-page work was stimulated by practical questions about the ancient culture of books but grew into a broad reevaluation and reorganization of our knowledge of ancient literature and intellectual life. His introduction argued:

The nature of the literature of antiquity and the form of the ancient book reciprocally conditioned each other. The context of publication enveloped and modified literary creativity. The dividends of these investigations will thereby far exceed the satisfaction of merely antiquarian pleasures.

Many of Birt's theories and interpretations are dated and have been superseded by later research, but he permanently broadened and deepened the methodologies used in histories of the ancient book and connected stichometry to a broad range of intellectual and literary issues.

In 1893, James Rendel Harris' book Stichometry extended these new developments to an analysis of the stichometric data found in many early manuscripts of the Christian Bible and other Christian texts.

In 1909, Domenico Bassi published a survey of the stichometric notations found on the papyri excavated at Herculaneum.

At the end of the 19th and beginning of the 20th centuries, archaeologists discovered a large number of fragmentary, Greek scrolls in Egyptian tombs, mummies, and city dumps. Some of these contained stichometric notations, and papyrologists became interested in the question of whether this data provided clues that would aid in reassembling the fragments. Kurt Ohly studied the stichometry found in many of the scrolls excavated at Herculaneum in Italy but his 1929 book Stichometrische Untersuchungen contained a complete survey of the treasure trove of newly discovered Greco-Egyptian papyri with stichometric notations. It is regarded as the standard work on stichometry. Ohly discusses the length of the standard line, the evidence for syllable counting, the various number systems used in stichometric reports, and the aims and history of stichometry among the Greeks, Romans, and Byzantines. Ohly's catalog of ancient papyri with stichometry together with Bassi's survey and the line reports in medieval manuscripts collected by Graux provide a wide range of evidence for ancient stichometric practices and their evolution through the centuries.

== Recent research and applications ==
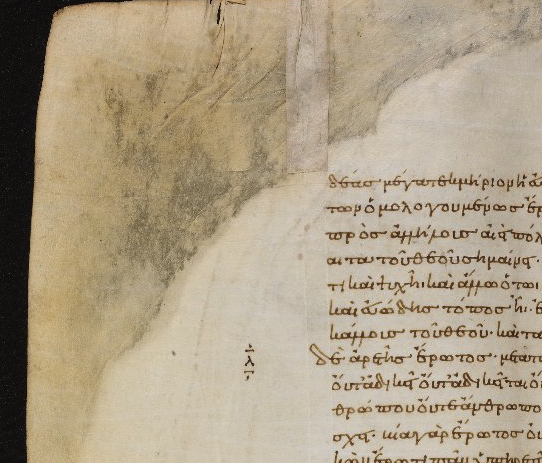
Partial stichometry in Plato: The lambda in the margin means 'line 1100' since lambda is the eleventh letter in the Greek alphabet. The Greeks used letters of the alphabet for numerals but decorated them to distinguish them from ordinary letters, here with a two bars and two dots. The same stichometric notations appear in another Plato manuscript and they probably derive from an early edition. Clarke Codex of Plato's Dialogues, copied in AD 895, Bodleian Library, Oxford University, leaf 210v, detail.

Rudolf Blum summarized research on stichometry in the catalog of Callimachus at the Library of Alexandria.

Holger Essler (University of Würzburg) discussed stichometry's role in the ongoing efforts to reconstruct the papyri excavated at Herculaneum.

Dirk Obbink (Oxford University) used stichometry in his restoration of Philodemus' On Piety.

Jay Kennedy (Manchester University) claimed in several articles and a book, The Musical Structure of Plato's Dialogues, that Plato counted the lines in his dialogues in order to insert symbolic passages at regular intervals and thereby formed various musical and Pythagorean patterns.

Rachel Yuen-Collingridge and Malcolm Choat (Macquarie University) used stichometry along with other kinds of evidence to make inferences about scribal practice and copying techniques.

Mirko Canevaro (Durham University) argued that the stichometric totals in the Demosthenes manuscripts descended from the earliest editions. He used these totals to show that the supposed excerpts of documentary evidence inserted in the speeches were not present in those early editions and were thus late forgeries. His book, The Documents in the Attic Orators, includes an introduction to stichometry.

== See also ==
- Stichometry of Nicephorus
- Attic numerals
- Greek numerals
