= Vi maler byen rød =

1989 song by Birthe Kjær

Single by Birthe Kjær
- Language: Danish
- Released: 1989
- Composer: Søren Bundgaard
- Lyricist: Keld Heick

Eurovision Song Contest 1989 entry
- Country: Denmark
- Artist: Birthe Kjær
- Language: Danish
- Composer: Søren Bundgaard
- Lyricist: Keld Heick
- Conductor: Henrik Krogsgaard and Benoît Kaufman

Finals performance
- Final result: 3rd
- Final points: 111

Entry chronology
- ◄ "Ka' du se hva' jeg sa'?" (1988)
- "Hallo Hallo" (1990) ►

"Vi maler byen rød" (Danish pronunciation: [vi ˈmɛːlɐ ˈpyˀən ˈʁœðˀ]; "We're painting the town red") is a song written by Søren Bundgaard (music) and Keld Heick (lyrics) and performed in Danish by Birthe Kjær. It represented Denmark in the Eurovision Song Contest 1989. The English version of the song is called "I'm Chasing Butterflies".

== Composition ==
"Vi maler byen rød" is an evocation of good times, with Kjær describing the fun that can be had by "painting the town red". Musically, it is written in the "dansband" style, then slightly old-fashioned but traditionally a Swedish import. It is also memorable for the fact that Kjær was one of the older contestants to have performed in many years. The performance was unique for the fact that not only the song's author, but also the conductor, Henrik Krogsgaard (also a Eurovision regular), joined Kjær on stage as backup singers and dancers. Krogsgaard was "invited" by Kjær to join her by a gesture referring to the song's lyrics, which he promptly did leaving the orchestra to be conducted by the host country's backup conductor, Benoît Kaufman, to the surprise of the TV viewers.

== At Eurovision ==
The song qualified as the Danish entry into the Eurovision Song Contest by the usual means of winning that year's Dansk Melodi Grand Prix. All of the contributors were Dansk Melodi Grand Prix regulars – although for Kjær it was the first, and only, time to win after three unsuccessful attempts, Keld Heick had by then authored lyrics to five winning songs, and Søren Bundgaard wrote music and co-performed three of them, although with another female vocalist, Kirsten Siggaard, as part of the duo Hot Eyes. Heick also wrote the lyrics to three 1990s Danish entries, and entered the Dansk Melodi Grand Prix numerous times from 1970s to 1990s as both lyricist, composer and performer (with his wife Hilda), while Søren Bundgaard also tried his luck as composer a few other times, including two unsuccessful Hot Eyes entries.

The song was performed twelfth on the night, following Luxembourg's Park Café with "Monsieur" and preceding Austria's Thomas Forstner with "Nur ein Lied". At the close of voting, it had received 111 points, placing 3rd in a field of 22. It was succeeded as Danish representative at the 1990 Contest by Lonnie Devantier with "Hallo Hallo", with lyrics also by Keld Heick.

== Legacy ==
The song has become known as one of the stronger Danish entries, and Birthe Kjær herself was originally slated to perform it as part of a medley of favourites at the Congratulations Eurovision 50th anniversary special in late 2005, but had to withdraw due to ill health. Her place was taken by Tomas Thordarson (from the 2004 contest) and the song was still greeted enthusiastically.

In 2009 it was announced that the song would be used as the title for the Danish musical Vi maler byen rød: The Musical. The show (written by Rasmus Mansachs) played in Copenhagen, Denmark in April 2010 and was based on and filled with more than 20 of the biggest Danish Eurovision Song from the 1950s up to the present. Birthe Kjær herself was in the audience in the premiere weekend. The show gained cult status long before its premiere, becoming the most "liked" Danish play on Facebook ever. Since then, the show has been staged several times around Denmark by different theatre groups and has become one of the most performed musicals of the decade in Denmark, having played all across the country numerous times each year since it first opened. In 2018, the successful musical sequel Vi maler byen rød: The Musical 2 premiered in Copenhagen with more than 30 Danish Eurovision songs that hadn't been featured in the original musical.
