= Aabenraa =

Aabenraa Affenråe (South Jutlandic) Apenrade (German)
- Town
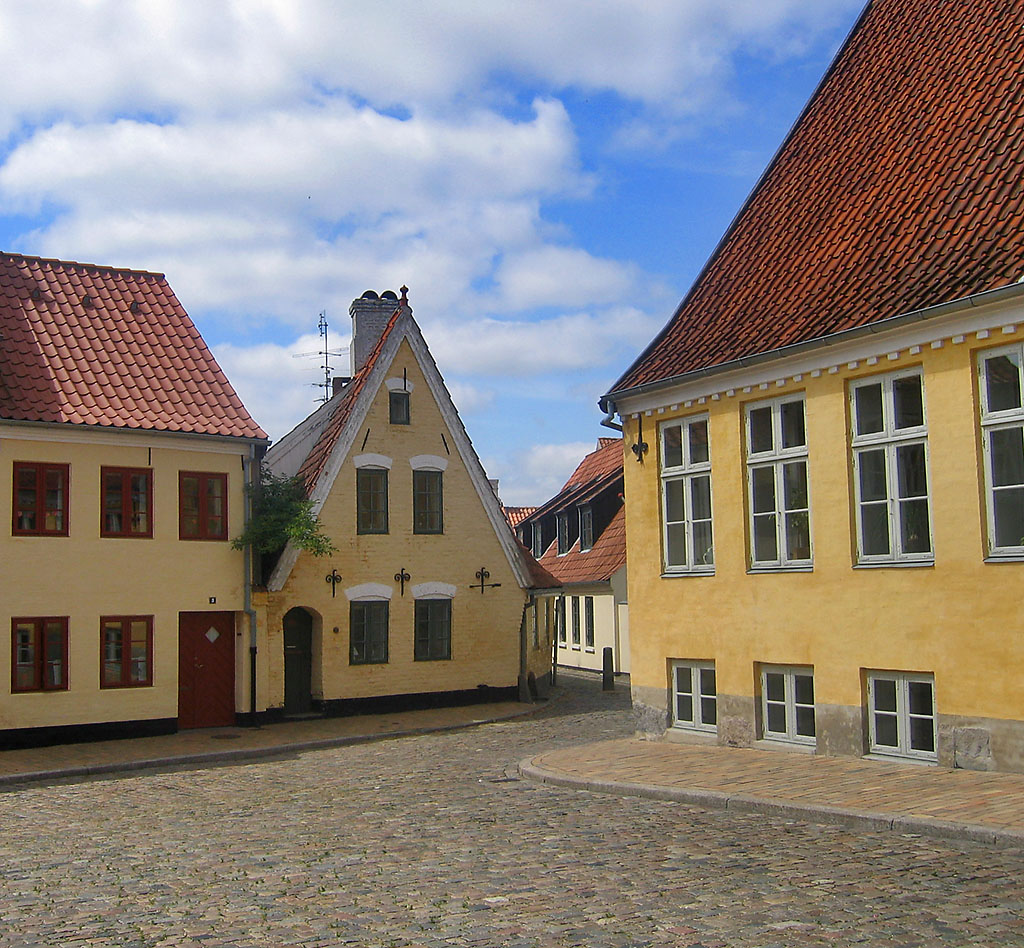
- Aabenraa in mid-July 2006

- Coat of arms

- Location in Denmark Aabenraa (Region of Southern Denmark)
- Coordinates: 55°2′40″N 9°25′5″E
- Country: Denmark
- Region: Southern Denmark
- Municipality: Aabenraa

Area
  - Urban: 9.69 km^{2} (3.74 sq mi)

Population (2026)
  - Urban: 16,468
  - Urban density: 1,700/km^{2} (4,400/sq mi)
  - Gender: 7,959 males and 8,509 females
- Time zone: UTC+1 (CET)
  - Summer (DST): UTC+2 (CEST)
- Postal code: DK-6200 Aabenraa
- Website: www.aabenraa.dk

Aabenraa (Danish pronunciation: [ɔːpm̩ˈʁɔˀ]; German: Apenrade, pronounced [aːpn̩ˈʁaːdə]; South Jutlandic: Affenråe; also spelled Åbenrå) is a town in Southern Denmark, at the head of the Aabenraa Fjord, an arm of the Little Belt, 26 kilometres (16 mi) north of the Denmark–Germany border and 32 kilometres (20 mi) north of German town of Flensburg. It was the seat of Sønderjyllands Amt (South Jutland County) until 1 January 2007, when the Region of Southern Denmark was created as part of the 2007 Danish Municipal Reform. With a population of 16,468 (1 January 2026), Aabenraa is the largest town and the seat of the Aabenraa Municipality.

The name Aabenraa originally meant "open beach" (Danish: åben strand).

== History ==
Aabenraa was first mentioned in historic accounts in the 12th century, when it was attacked by the Wends.

Aabenraa started growing in the early Middle Ages around Opnør Hus, the bishop's castle, and received status as a merchant town in 1240, and in 1335 it received a charter. During the Middle Ages the town was known for its fishing industry and for its production of hops.

Between 1560 and 1721, the town was under the rule of the Dukes of Holstein-Gottorp.

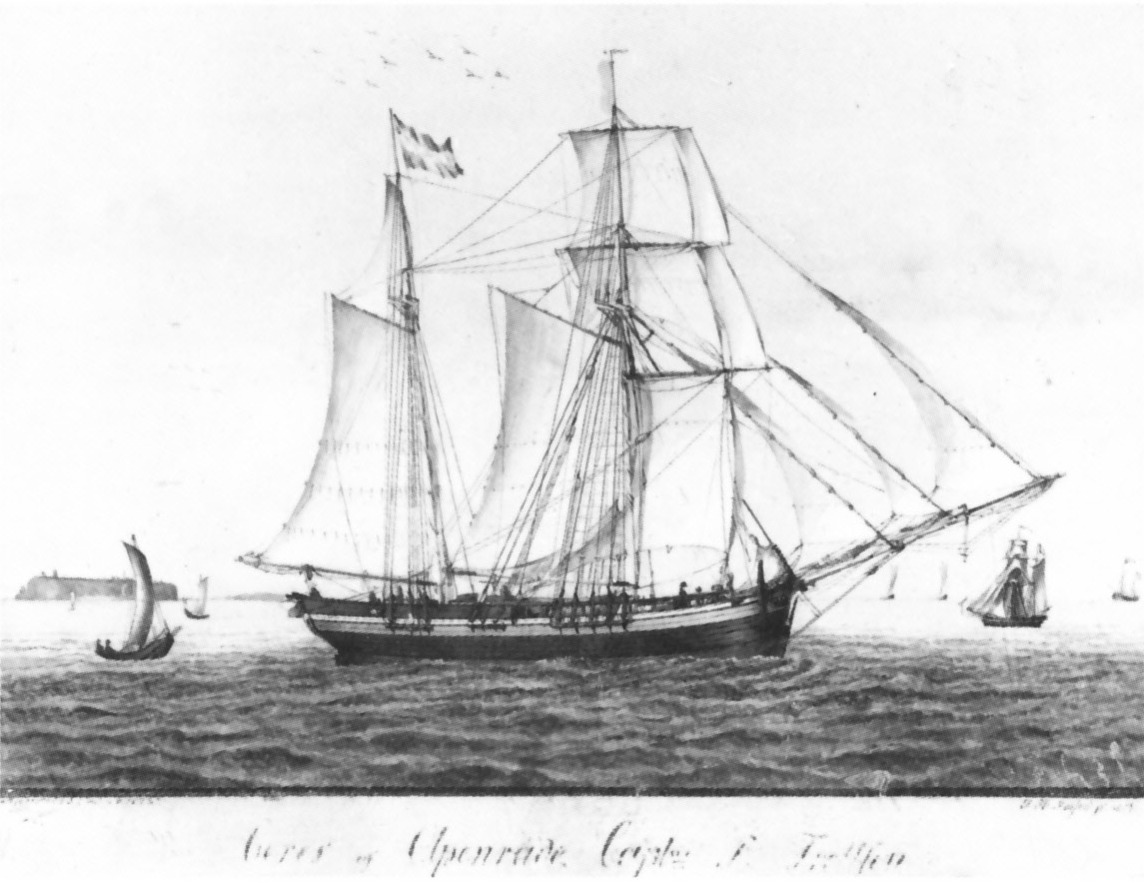
Jessen - Ceres af Aabenraa - 1826

The town's glory days were during the period of the 1750s to c. 1864, when ship traffic was at a high growth rate with trade to the Mediterranean Sea, China, South America, and Australia. It possessed a good harbour, which afforded shelter for a large carrying trade, Aabenraa having the Danish monarchy's third-largest trade fleet, after Copenhagen and Flensborg. The city had a number of shipbuilding yards, which were known for their fine ships. The best known being the clipper Cimber, which in 1857 sailed from Liverpool to San Francisco in 106 days. Fishing and various small factories also provided occupations for the population.

From 1864 as a result of the Second War of Schleswig it was part of Prussia, and as such part of the North German Confederation, and from 1871 onwards, part of the German Empire. In the 1920 Schleswig Plebiscite that brought Northern Schleswig to Denmark, 55.1% of Aabenraa's inhabitants voted for remaining part of Germany and 44.9% voted for the cession to Denmark. However, since a plurality of votes in the surrounding Aabenraa municipality voted to join Denmark, the town was thus ceded to the Danish crown.

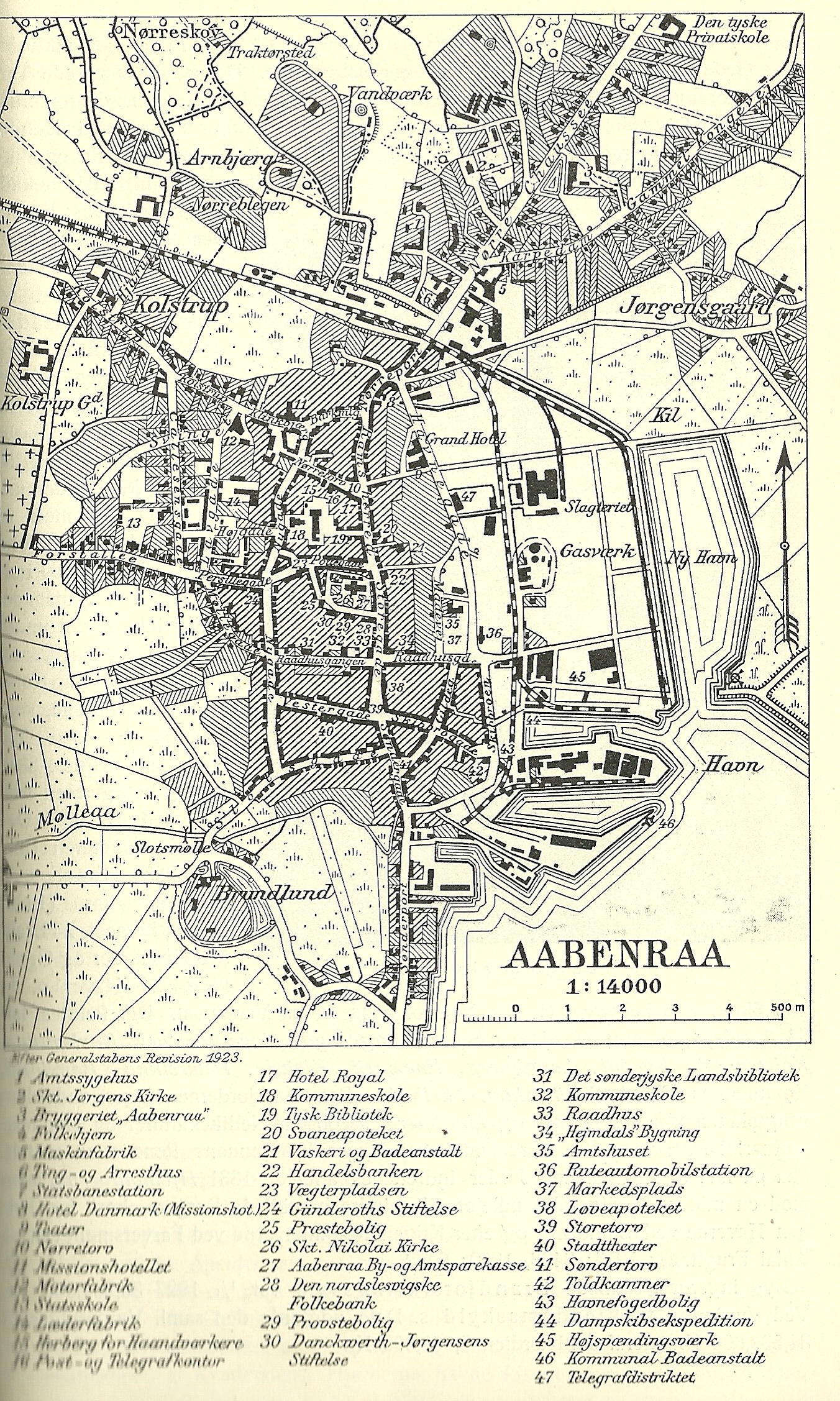
Map of Aabenraa in 1923

After the 1948 Danish spelling reform, which abolished the digraph Aa in favor of Å, there was fervent resistance in Aabenraa. The town feared, among other things, losing its status as first in alphabetical listings (and reputedly the first town alphabetically anywhere in the world), because the letter Å is the last letter in the Dano-Norwegian alphabet. A later revision of the spelling rules allowed for retaining the Aa spelling as an option. While the municipality of Aabenraa and most local citizens use the Aa spelling, Åbenrå remains the option recommended by the Danish Language Board.

On June 14, 2019, a low-end IF2/F2/T4 tornado touched down in Aabenraa. Two vehicles were flipped on the local hospital's parking lot. Another primarily rated High-end IF1/F1/T3 tornado struck åbenrå on July 13, 2023, causing moderate damage. Some trees were downed & some buildings were damaged, including one commercial building that had its roof severely blown away. 6 cars were damaged with one being moved 50 Centimetres.

== Today ==
The town has a 7.5-meter-deep (25 ft) harbour, with a significant shipping trade. There are various industries in the city, including Marcussen's Organ Building (Marcussens Orgelbyggeri) and Callesens Machineworks (Callesens Maskinfabrik). The city is the administrative centre for the county. Danmarks Radio has an office in the city. A German minority lives in Aabenraa, and they publish Der Nordschleswiger newspaper in German.

Some noteworthy buildings in the town are St. Nicholas Church (Sankt Nicolai Kirke) from the time of King Valdemar with construction beginning ca. 1250, and restored from 1949 to 1956. Brundlund Castle (Brundlund Slot), erected by Queen Margaret I in 1411, and rebuilt in 1807, today is home to the Brundlund Slot Art Museum (Kunstmuseet Brundlund Slot). The town is a bathing resort, as is Elisenlund close by.

The city has several preserved neighborhoods from the 1800s including Slotsgade, Store Pottergade, Lille Pottergade, Nygade, Nybro, Skibbrogade and Gildegade.

== Education ==
A branch of University College South (Danish: University College Syd) can be found in Aabenraa.

== Transport and infrastructure ==
The Port of Aabenraa is the only remaining active commercial port in Southern Jutland. With a depth of 18 metres, it is the deepest port in the eastern part of the Baltic Sea.

Aabenraa is located close to the European route E45 motorway.

The nearest railway station is Rødekro railway station which is located on the Fredericia–Padborg railway line c. 8 km northwest of Aabenraa.

== Notable people ==
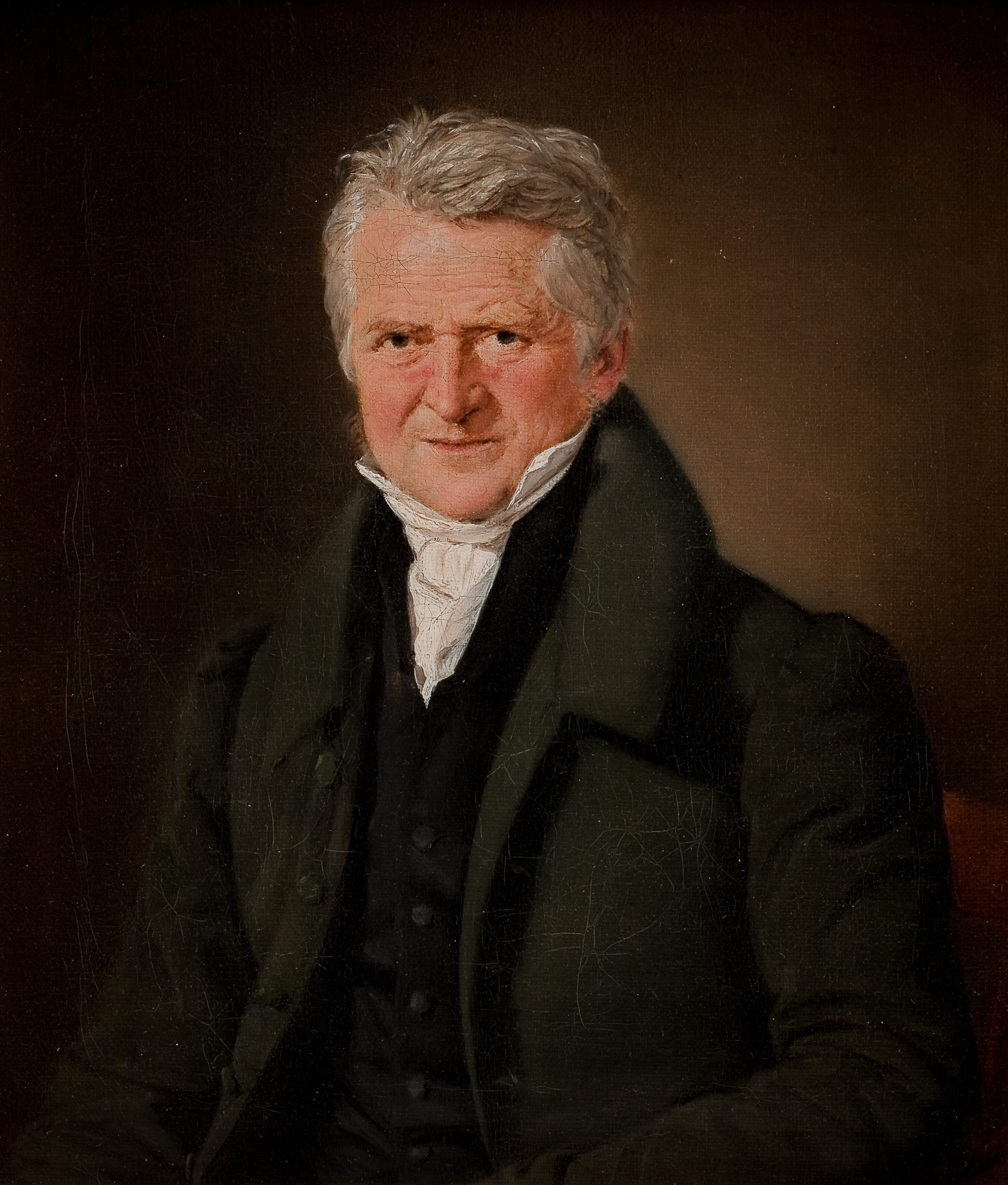
C.W. Eckersberg, 1832

=== The arts ===
- Christoffer Wilhelm Eckersberg (1783 in Blåkrog – 1853) Danish painter, laid the foundations for the Golden Age of Danish Painting
- Anna Christiane Ludvigsen (1794 – 1864), poet who gained popularity in Southern Jutland
- Magda von Dolcke (1838 in Åbenrå – 1926), Danish stage actress, known for her relationship with King Oscar II of Sweden
- Emil Nolde (1867 in Burkal – 1956), German-Danish painter and printmaker, one of the first Expressionists
- Karl Clausen (1904 in Åbenrå – 1972), Danish pianist, conductor, composer, and musicologist
- Lisbeth Balslev (born 1945 in Åbenrå), operatic soprano, especially in Wagnerian operas

=== Public thinking and public service ===
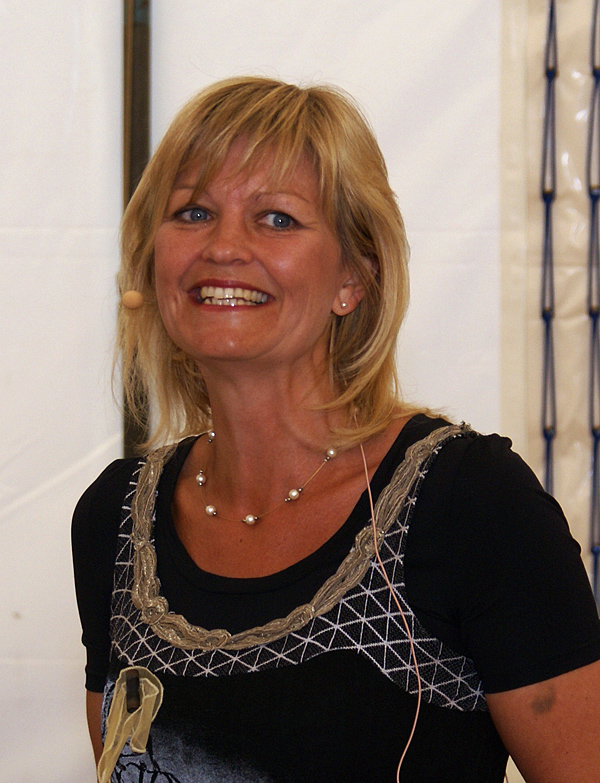
Eva Kjer Hansen, 2008

- Andreas du Plessis de Richelieu (1852 in Åbenrå – 1932), Danish naval officer and businessman, became a Siamese admiral and minister
- Ernst Reuter (1889 in Apenrade – 1953), the German Mayor of West Berlin from 1948 to 1953
- Frits Clausen (1893 in Åbenrå – 1947), leader of the National Socialist Workers' Party of Denmark (DNSAP)
- Camma Larsen-Ledet (1915 – 1991 in Åbenrå), politician, Mayor of Aabenraa 1970–1986
- Bertel Haarder (born 1944 in Rønshoved), politician, longest serving Danish minister since 2001
- Jens-Peter Bonde (1948 – 2021 in Åbenrå), former politician and MEP
- Poul Mathias Thomsen (born 1955 in Aabenraa), Danish economist working for the IMF
- Eva Kjer Hansen (born 1964 in Hellevad), Danish politician - Venstre

=== Science and business ===
- Christian Friedrich Ecklon (1795 – 1868), botanical collector and apothecary, came from Åbenrå
- Michael Jebsen (1835 in Apenrade – 1899) ship's captain and ship owner, progenitor of the Jebsen Group in Hong Kong
- Niels Jacobsen (1865 in Åbenrå - 1935), architect and politician, Chairman of The Lego Group

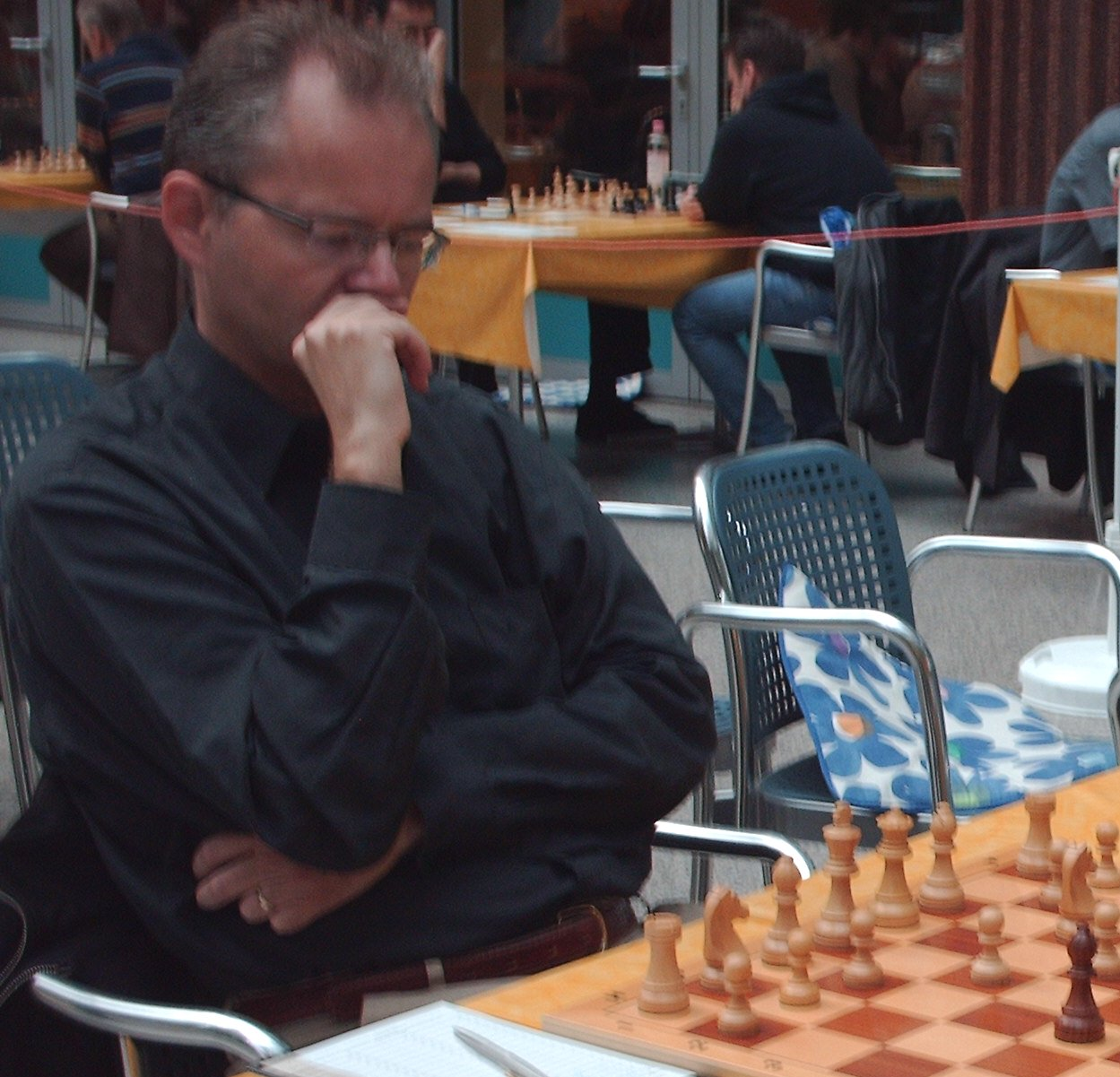
Curt Hansen, 2006

- Jes Peter Asmussen (1928 in Åbenrå – 2002), Danish Iranologist
- Birte Melsen (born 1939 in Åbenrå), orthodontist
- Ib Holm Sørensen (1949 – 2012), computer scientist

=== Sport ===
- Curt Hansen (born 1964 in Bov), Danish chess Grandmaster
- Sidsel Bodholt Nielsen (born 1989 in Åbenrå), Danish handball player

== Gallery ==
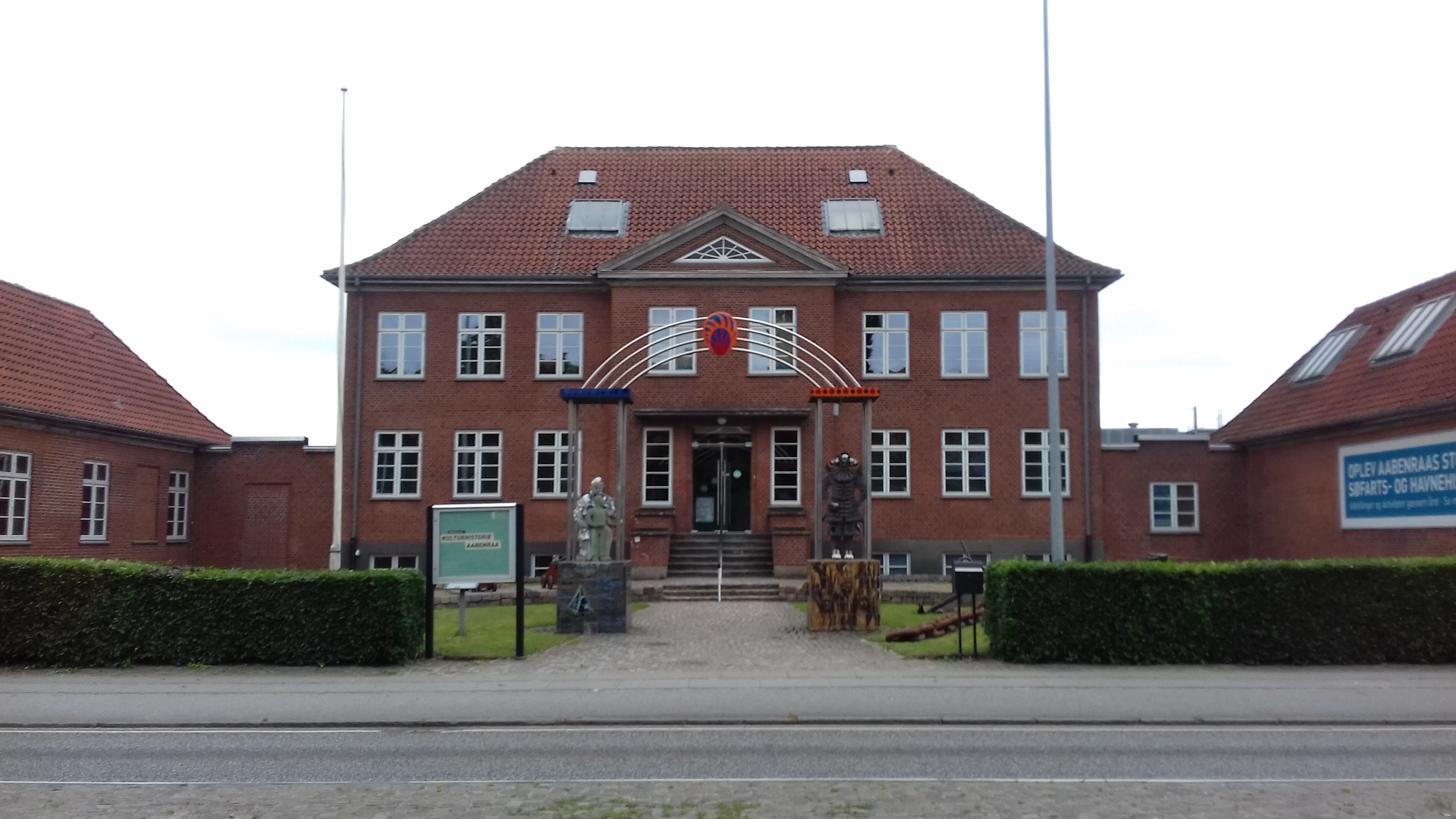
Maritime Museum

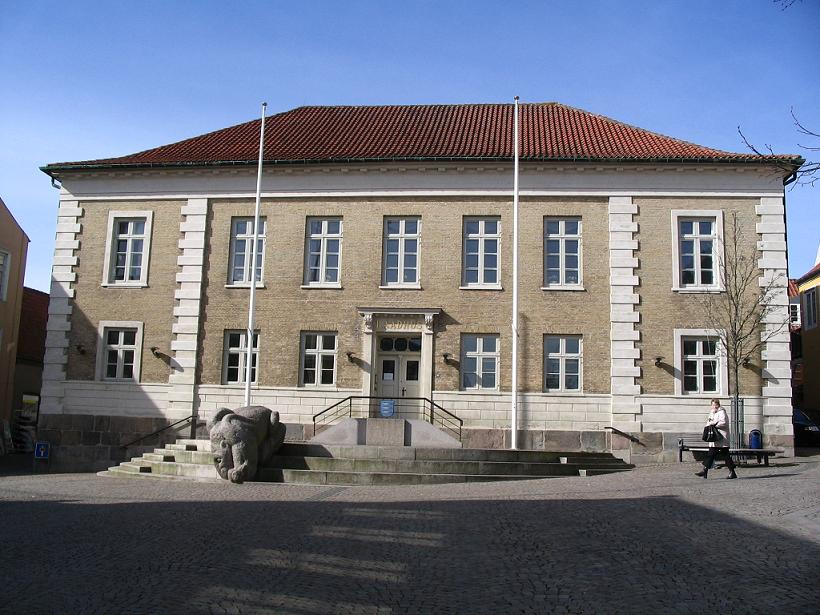
Town Hall

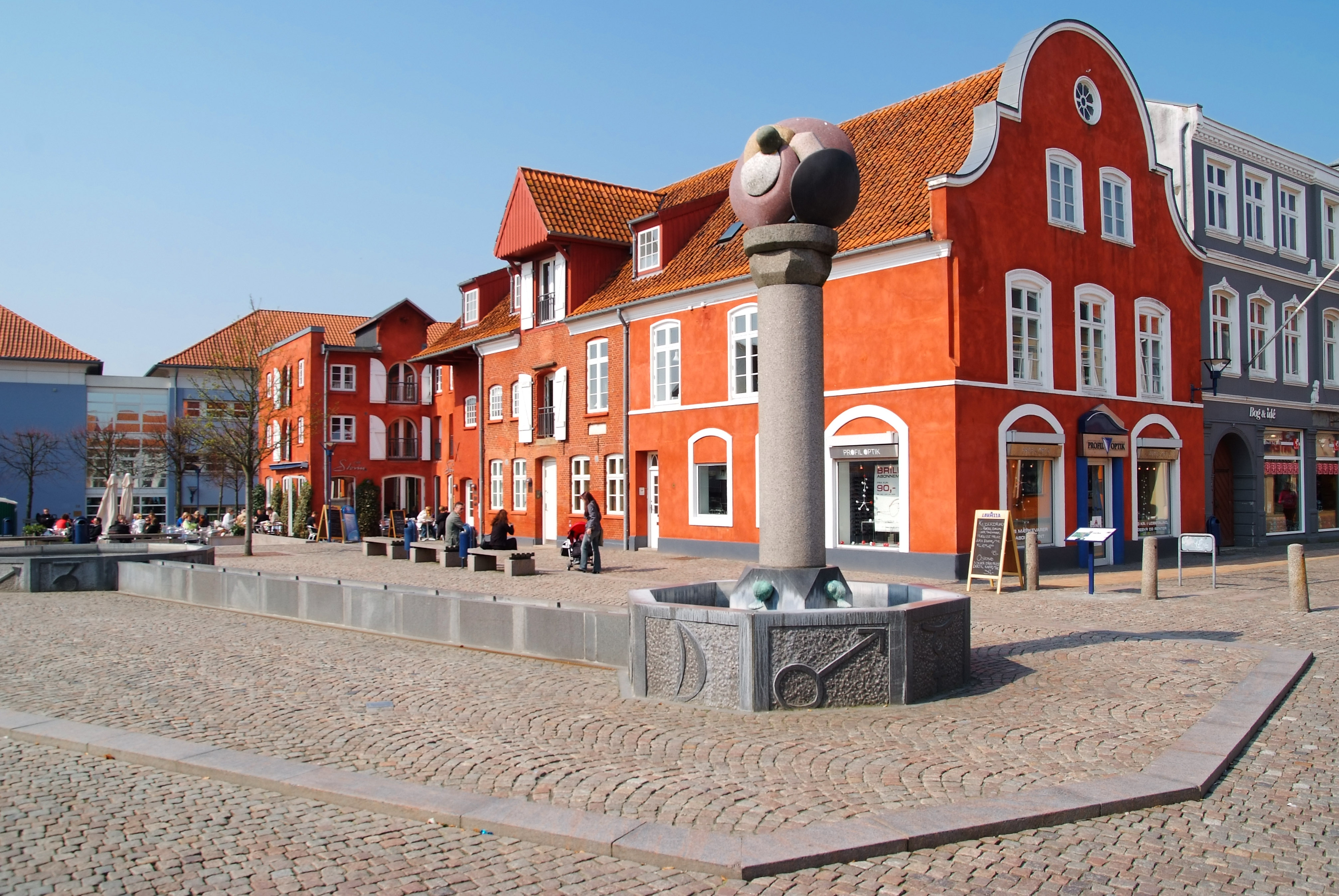
Storetorv

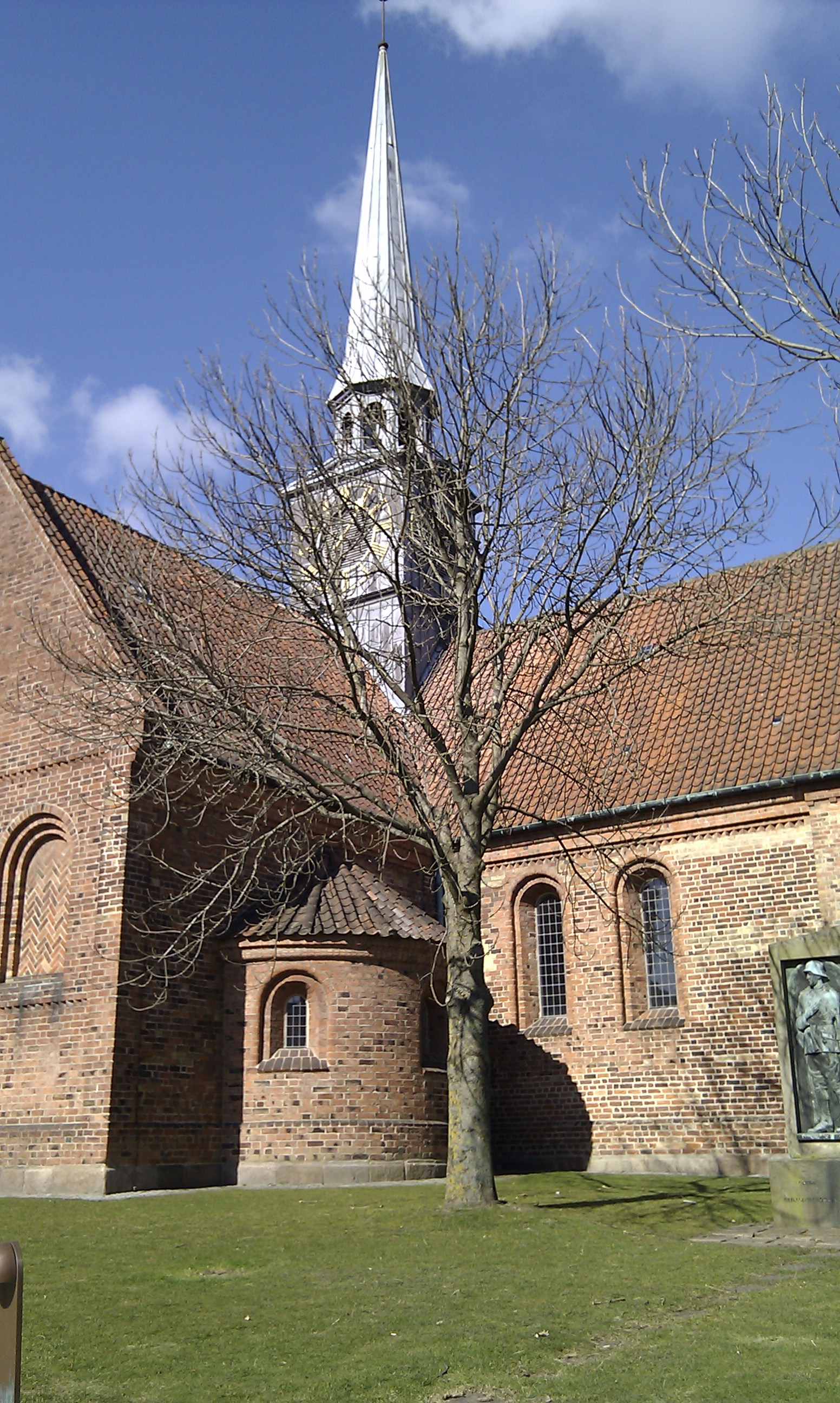
St. Nicholas Church

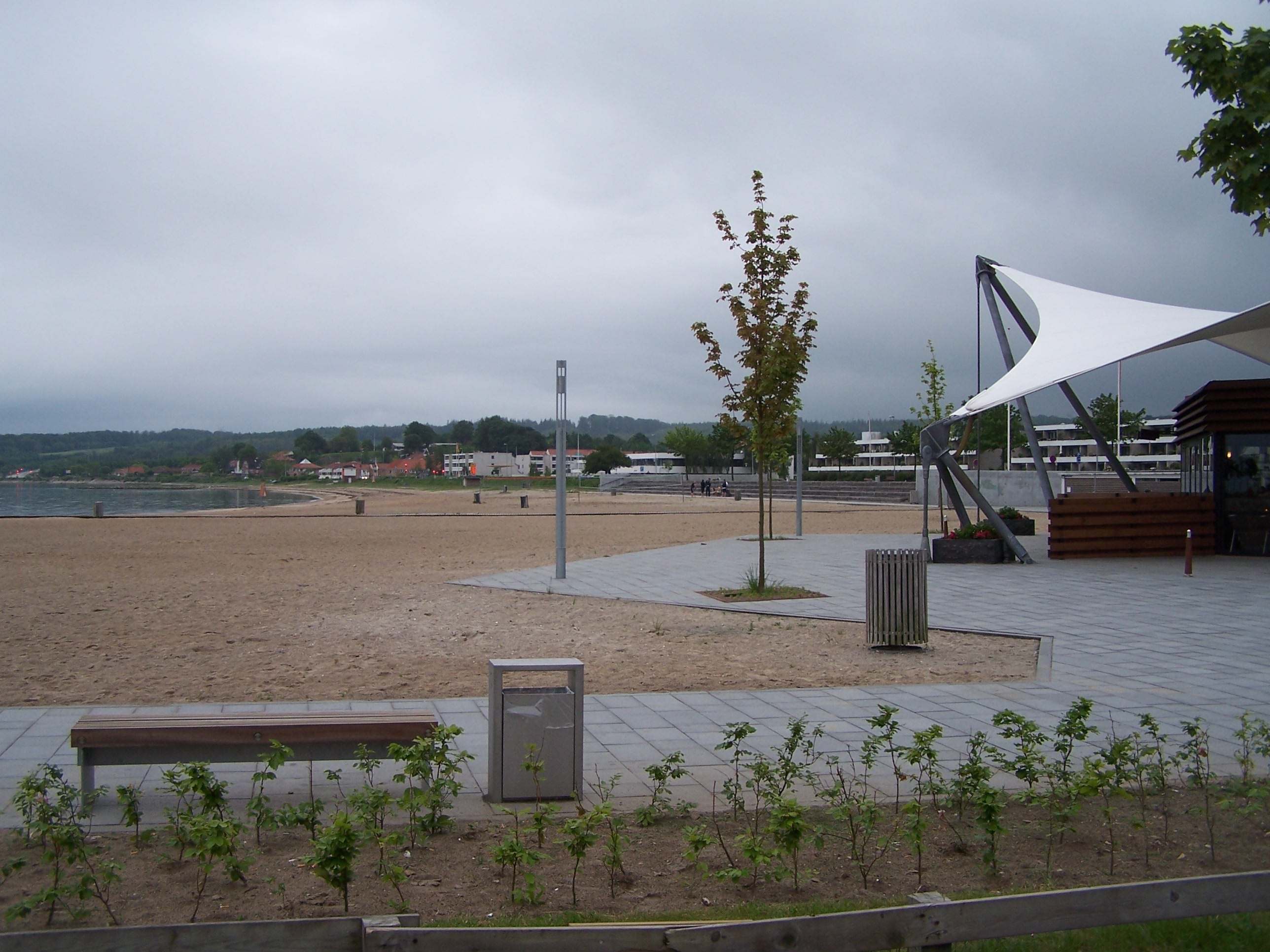
Beach

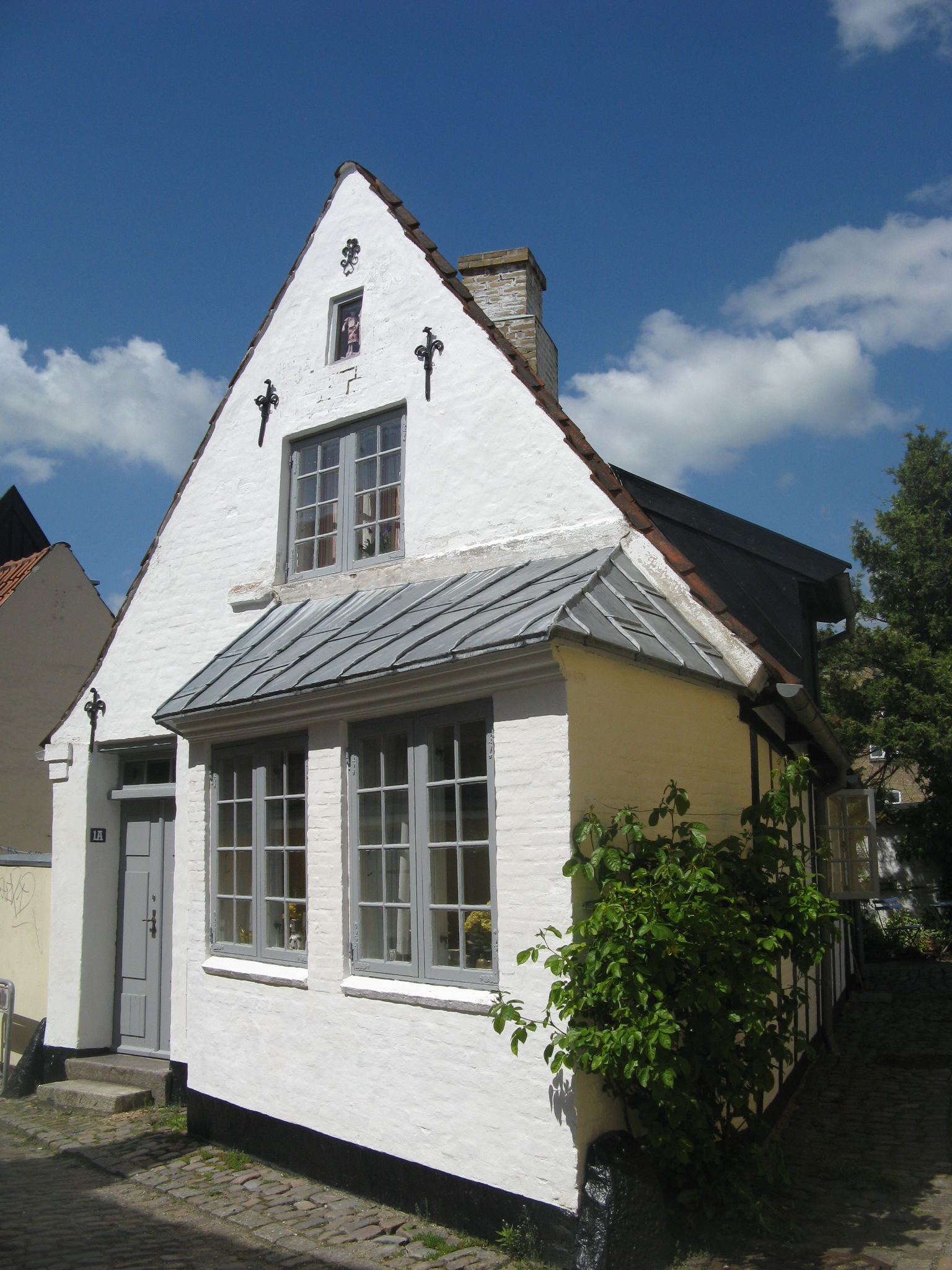
Handwerkerhaus

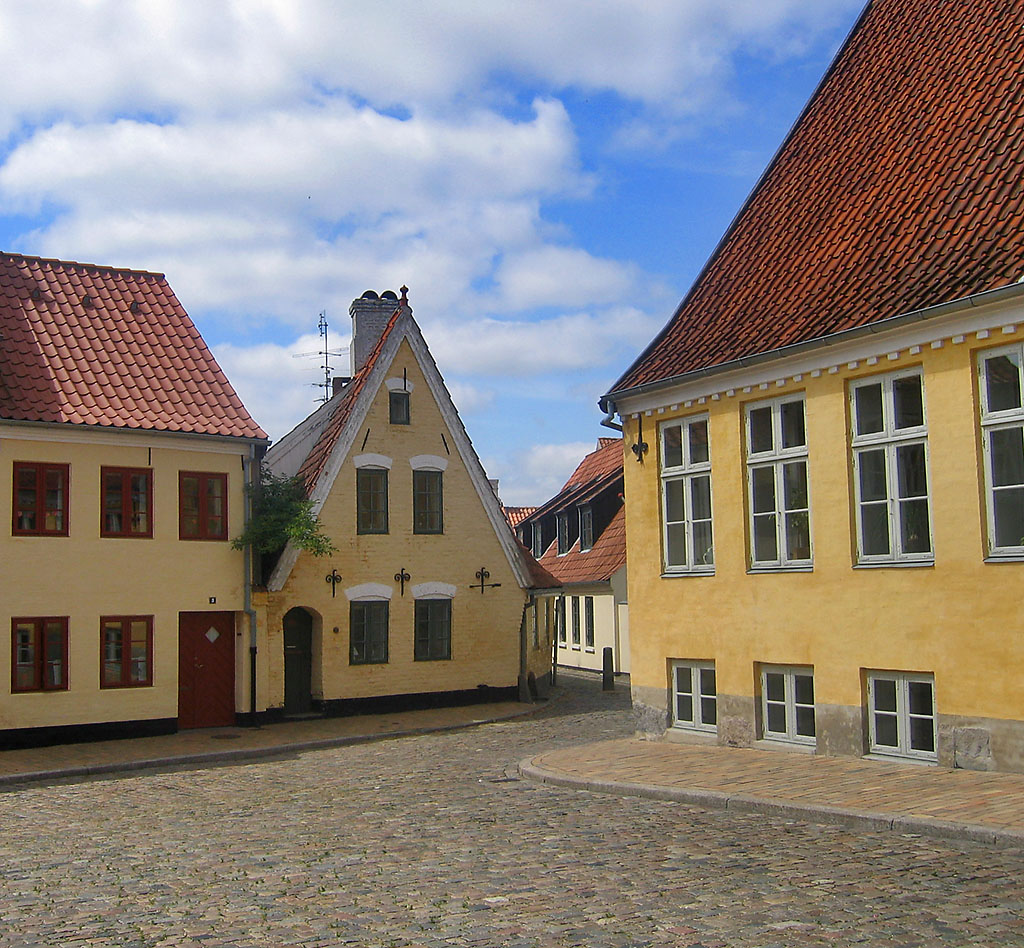
Vægterpladsen Aabenraa

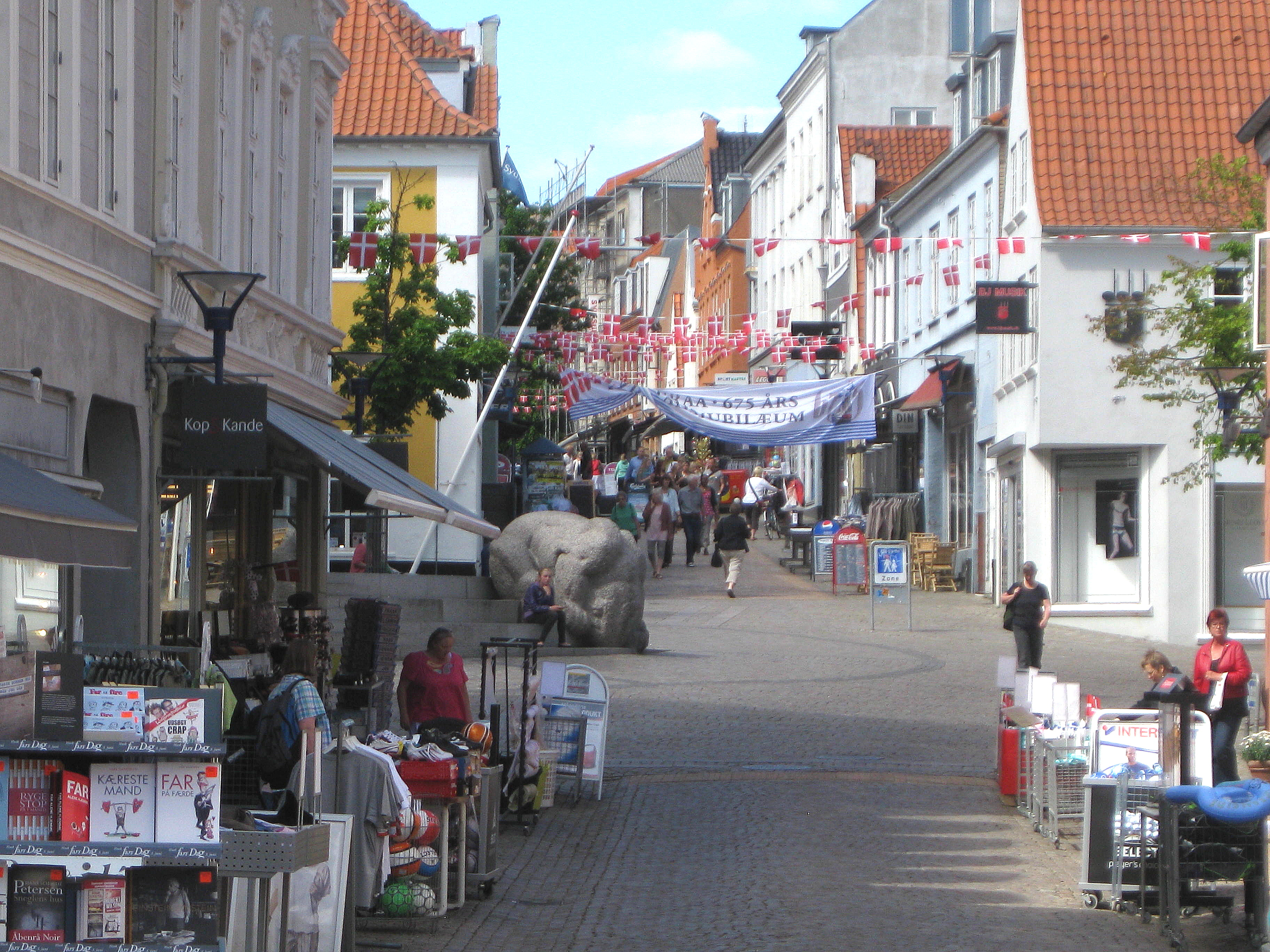
Storegade
