= Birthe Kjær =

Danish singer (born 1948)

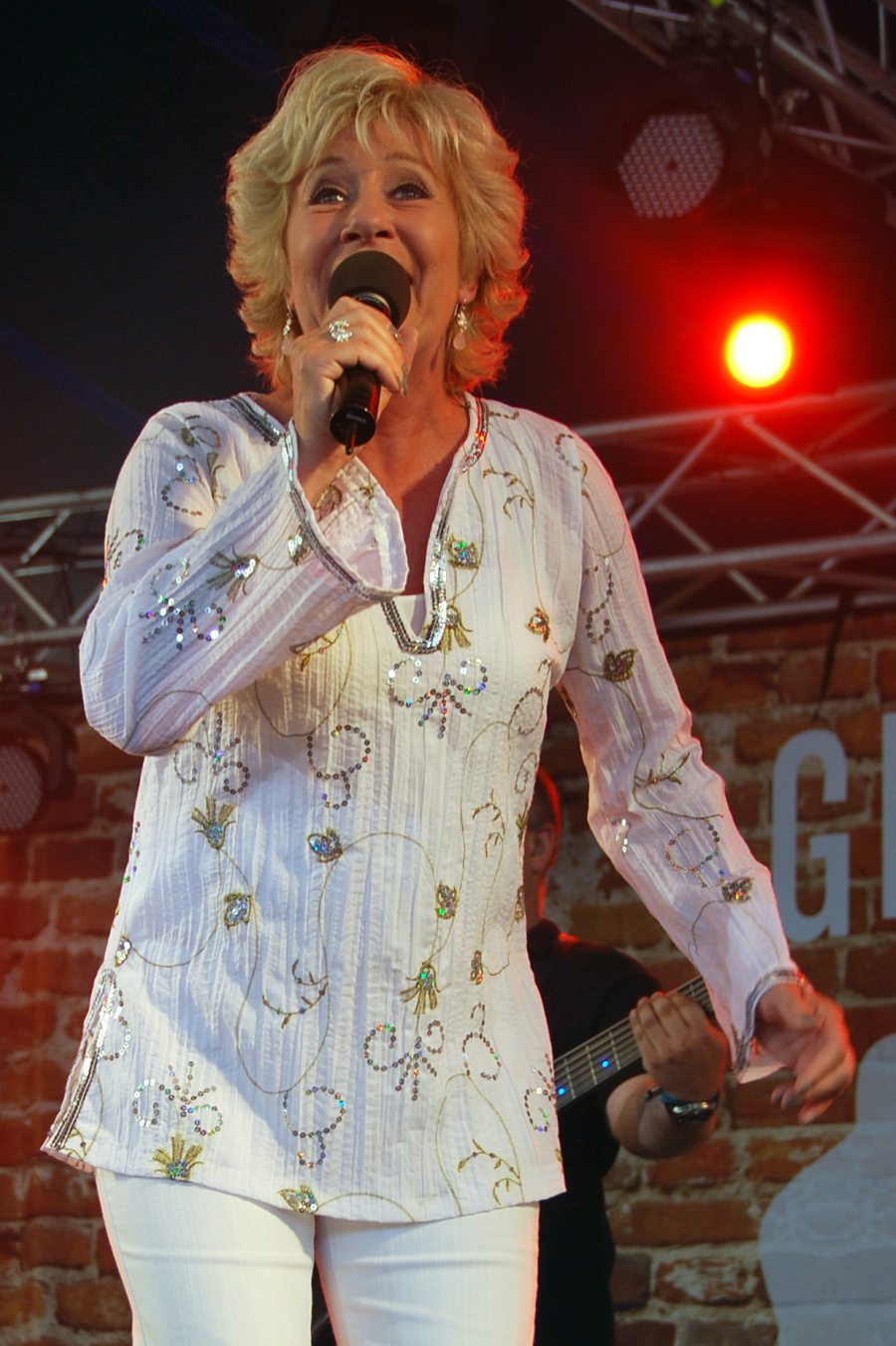
- Birthe Kjær during concert at Vig Festival 2010. (Foto: Lars Schmidt)

Background information
- Born: 1 September 1948 (age 78)
- Origin: Aarhus, Denmark
- Genres: pop, schlager, dansktop
- Occupation: Singer

Birthe Kjær (born 1 September 1948) is a Danish singer. She finished second at the Dansk Melodi Grand Prix in 1980, 1986 and 1987, before winning in 1989, and went on to finish third at the Eurovision Song Contest 1989 in Lausanne. She also finished third at the Dansk Melodi Grand Prix in 1991.

== Career ==
Born in Aarhus, Kjær began her career in the late 1960s. She had made previous bids to represent Denmark in the Eurovision Song Contest, finishing second in 1980, 1986 and 1987, before being chosen in 1989 with the cabaret-style song "Vi maler byen rød" (We paint the town red). Her performance in Lausanne earned the song a third-place finish. She hosted the Danish national contest in 1990, before attempting to represent Denmark again in 1991, finishing third at that years Dansk Melodi Grand Prix with "Din musik, min musik".

In June 2004, her single with Safri Duo "Hvor' vi fra?" (the Denmark national football team's anthem for the 2004 UEFA European Football Championship) achieved a gold record with 4,900 copies sold. In Autumn 2005, she took part in the second season of the Danish Dancing with the Stars ("Vild med dans"), but she withdrew following a heart attack. On 31 January 2009, Kjær hosted the Danish final to pick the 2009 Danish entry for the Eurovision Song Contest.

== Discography ==
=== Albums ===
Year	Album	Peak positions	Certifications
Year	Album	DEN	Certifications
1969	Danse og synge med Birthe Kjær		
1971	Træffere		
1973	Jeg skal aldrig til bal uden trusser		
1974	Tennessee Waltz		
1976	Det var en yndig tid		
1977	Fuglen og barnet		
1977	Nu er det jul igen		
1978	Nu		
1980	Tak for al musikken		
1981	Her er jeg		
1982	Jeg er på vej		
1983	Hvorfor er kærligheden rød?		
1986	Vil du med?		
1987	1987		
1988	100%		
1989	På en anden måde		
1990	Montmartre		
1991	Med kjærlig hilsen		
1993	Jeg ka' ikke la' vær'		
1996	Vildt forelsket		
1997	På vores måde		
1998	Som en fugl i det fri		
2001	Længe leve livet	25	
2003	På en fransk altan	20	
2005	6 originale albums fra 1969 - 77	10	
2006	Lys i mørket	19	
2007	Let It Snow	15	
2008	Gennem 40 år	10	
2011	Smile	10	
2013	Birthe	5	
2015	Lige fra hjertet	13	
2018	50 års pletskud	9	
2022	Juletid	16	

== Filmography ==
- 1973: Revykøbing kalder
- 1988: Jydekompagniet
- 2000: Max

Preceded by Hot Eyes with Ka' du se hva' jeg sa'?	Denmark in the Eurovision Song Contest; 1989	Succeeded by Lonnie Devantier with Hallo Hallo
