= Magda von Dolcke =

Danish actress (1838–1926)

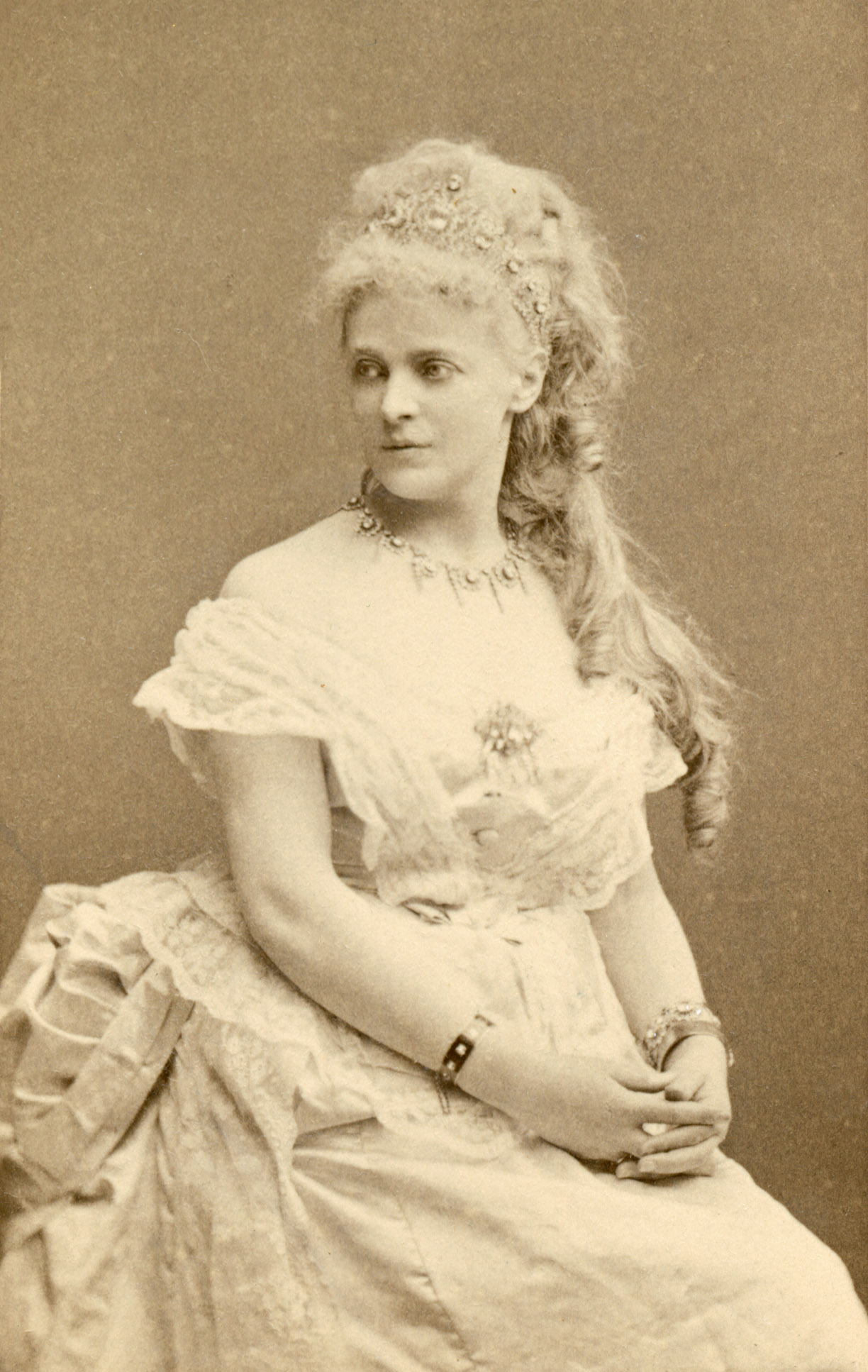
- Photograph of von Dolcke by Gösta Florman, 1873
- Born: Caroline Christine Magdalene von Dolcke; February 28, 1838; Aabenraa, Denmark
- Died: October 22, 1926 (aged 88); Roskilde, Denmark
- Other name: Rosalinde Thomsen
- Occupations: Actress, theatre manager

Magda von Dolcke (28 February 1838 – 22 October 1926) was a Danish stage actress and the director of a travelling theatre company. She was primarily active in Sweden and Denmark, where she also performed under the stage name Rosalinde Thomsen.

Dolcke grew up in the Duchy of Holstein, but returned to Denmark where she made her debut as an actress at the Royal Danish Theatre in 1859. During her career she performed in Denmark, Germany, and Sweden. She was known to have had high-profile affairs with the Norwegian writer Bjørnstjerne Bjørnson in 1860 and with King Oscar II of Sweden in 1874. She withdrew from her career and public life after being married in the 1880s in Copenhagen.

== Biography ==
Caroline Christine Magdalene Dolcke was born on 28 February 1848 in Aabenraa. At a young age, her family moved to Hemmingstedt within the Duchy of Holstein. As a child, she frequently came into conflict with Low German–speaking schoolchildren, who bullied her for her differences. Ostracised by her peers, she had a relatively isolated childhood.

Dolcke was admitted as a student to the Royal Danish Theatre, where she made her debut as an actress on 20 November 1859 as Johanne in Eventyr paa Fodrejsen. Initially, she performed under the stage name Rosalinde Thomsen, hoping to be identified as Danish by hiding her German surname and accent. At the Royal Danish Theatre she performed in productions of Livet i Skoven and Hans Christian Andersen's The Queen of 16.

At the end of the 1862–63 season, she left the theatre to travel to Berlin and St. Petersburg to study. In 1868, she began performing in Copenhagen again, this time with the Folketeatret, where her performance as Jane Eyre in Et Vaisenhusbarn gained her particular notoriety. She then began touring with a travelling theatre company.

In 1860, Dolcke met and began an affair with Bjørnson. Their affair was common knowledge in Copenhagen, and Bjørnson described their relationship as a "Pagt med en Sjel" (English: Pact with a Soul). Bjørnson left Denmark in December 1860, though they continued to exchange intimate letters. He briefly returned to visit her in 1872.

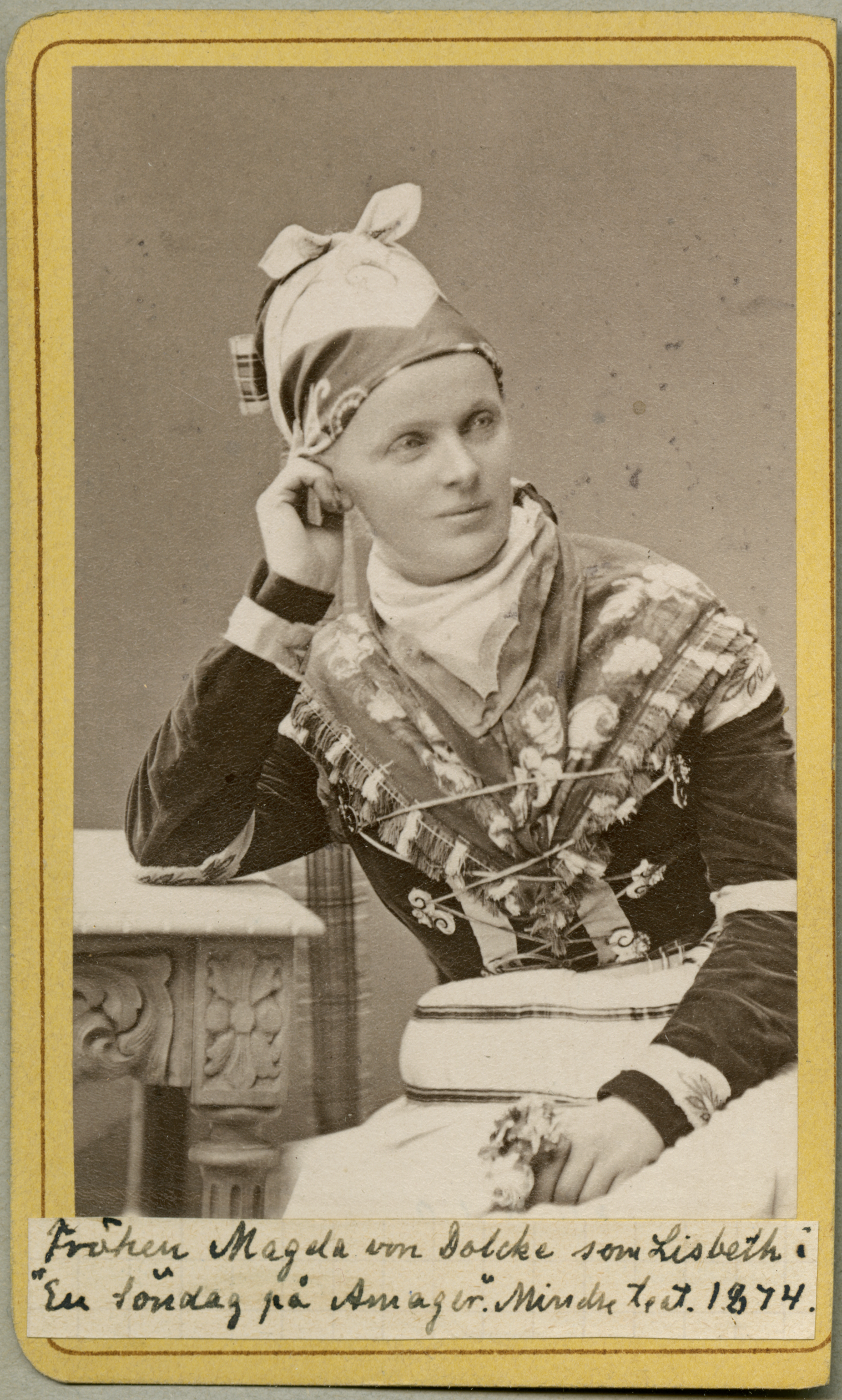
Dolcke as Lisbeth in En söndag på Amager at Mindre teatern, photographed by Mathias Hansen, 1874

In 1873, she received an invitation to perform at the Royal Dramatic Theatre in Stockholm, Sweden, under the condition that she learn Swedish. In 1874, Dolcke was cast as the lead in August Strindberg's production of The Maid of Orleans. The board of the Royal Dramatic Theatre was reluctant to allow her to appear, however, she was a favorite of Strindberg's who advocated for her performance.

On 14 March 1874, her performance of The Maid of Orleans was attended by King Oscar II. At this point, she had a relationship with the king, during which the queen, Sofia of Nassau, left for Germany, officially for her health. Dolcke spend six years in Sweden, performing at the Royal Dramatic Theatre, touring on stage, and eventually directing her own theatre company.

Dolcke briefly returned to Denmark in April 1879 to tour, before performing again in Sweden, this time in Gothenburg. Shortly thereafter, she married a businessman and factory owner from Copenhagen, and retired from public life.
