= Poul Mathias Thomsen =

Danish economist

Poul M. Thomsen
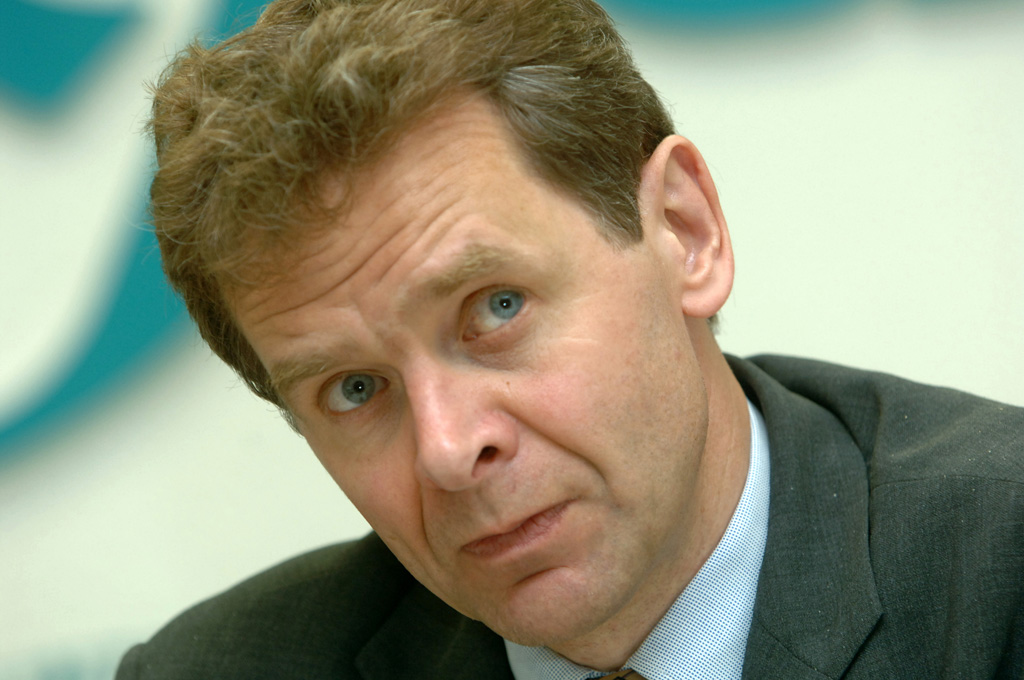

European Department, International Monetary Fund
- In office November 2014 – July 2020
- President: Christine Lagarde; David Lipton (Acting); Kristalina Georgieva
- Succeeded by: Alfred Kammer

Personal details
- Born: 1955 (age 70–71) Aabenraa, Denmark

Poul Mathias Thomsen (born 21 May 1955, in Aabenraa) is a Danish economist working for the International Monetary Fund (IMF) since the 1980s. He served as the director of the IMF's European Department. He led the bailouts of Iceland, Greece, Portugal and Ukraine during and after the Great Recession.

He retired from the IMF in July 2020.

== Reception in Europe ==
=== Greece ===
He was referred as "Mr Blue Eyes" on Greek press. Because of his strict and debatable financial tactics (as he insisted on implementing more taxes and cutting pensions and salaries), and, especially, accusations that such imposed measures actually prolonged the country's debt crisis, he became one of the most repugnant persons in Greece.

He also raised concern on the Greek press on the amount of his pension that will receive as he retires in July.
