= Anna Christiane Ludvigsen =

Danish poet

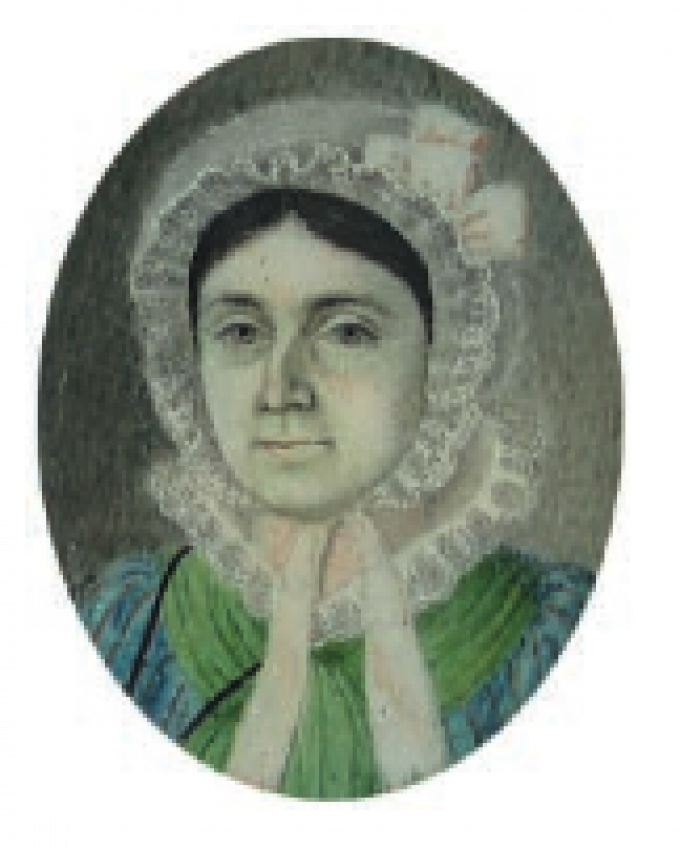
Anna Christiane Ludvigsen

Anna Christiane Lauterup Ludvigsen (1794–1884) was a Danish poet. Frequently reminded of how she had been blessed in her cradle by the Swiss priest and poet Johann Kaspar Lavater, she felt it was her vocation to write poetry. As she spent most of her life in Southern Jutland, from the 1830s her poetry gained significance as a result of the national uprising among Danish speakers in the area. In 1852, she published the two-volume Markblomster af Anna (Wild Flowers by Anna). After the region came under German rule in 1864, her poetry about the countryside and people's lives became even more popular as the spirit of Danishness emerged.

== Biography ==
Born on 14 June 1794 in Aabenraa, Anna Christiane Lauterup was the daughter of the priest Johann Christian Lorenzen Lauterup (1763–1845) and his wife Anna née Bonnichsen (1749–1827). In June 1819 she married the parish priest Jürgen Simon Jessen who died in 1842. In September 1844, she married the farmer Laurenz Paulsen Lauterup (1815–1864). While an infant, she was blessed by the celebrated Swiss poet J. C. Lavater. The event was discussed so frequently that she felt it was her duty to become a poet herself.

In 1796, the family moved to Brede where together with local children she was taught by her father, acquiring German, French and Latin. After her marriage with Jessen in 1819, the couple moved to various parishes in the south of Jutland, including Dagebøl, Visby and Vedsted. Following his death in 1842, she moved into the home of her now widowed father. In 1844, she married the considerably younger Laurenz Lauterup and became a farmer's wife, settling in Vollum near Tønder. After Lauterup died in 1864, she moved to Ribe but in 1867 returned to Southern Jutland, now under German rule, spending her last 17 years in Tinglev.

While a priest's wife, in 1840 she published a number of poems in the local newspaper Dannevirke under the heading "Hedebomster af Anna" (Flowers of the Heath). After corresponding with Adam Oehlenschläger and B.S. Ingemann, in 1852 she published her two-volume collection Markblomster af Anna. Her poems, which made use of many of Oehlenschläger's clichés, lacked originality but were welcomed by the Danish speakers of the south of Jutland as they strove to support their culture.

Anna Christiane Ludvigsen died in Tinglev on 28 June 1884.
