= Martin Schanz =

German classical philologist (1842–1914)

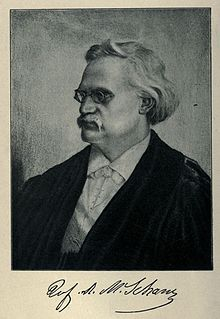
- Born: Martin Schanz; 12 June 1842; Üchtelhausen, Germany
- Died: 15 December 1914 (aged 72); Würzburg, Germany
- Occupations: classicist, Plato scholar

Martin Schanz (12 June 1842 – 15 December 1914) was a German classicist and Plato scholar. He was a Dozent and Professor at the University of Würzburg from 1867 to 1912, and is especially known for his history of Roman literature and his ground-breaking, critical edition of Plato's dialogues.

== Life ==
Schanz came from an old and well-established farming family in Lower Franconia. His father, Melchior Schanz, worked as a high school teacher (Volksschullehrer) in Üchtelhausen. The family moved to Bad Königshofen in 1845 and to Großbardorf in 1850. Four of Schanz's eight sisters died in childhood. His brother Georg von Schanz became an economist.

After his graduation in Münnerstadt, Schanz studied classical philology and philosophy from 1861 to 1866 at the Ludwig-Maximilians-Universität München under Karl Felix Halm und Carl von Prantl and at the University of Würzburg under Ludwig von Urlichs. After studying for a semester at the University of Bonn (1864/1865) with Otto Jahn and Friedrich Wilhelm Ritschl, he returned to the University of Würzburg and was promoted in 1866 with a dissertation on the reconstruction of Socrates' philosophy from Plato's writings. Afterwards, he spent a year at the University of Göttingen with Hermann Sauppe. He was graduated ('habilitiert') after returning again to the University of Würzburg in 1870 and joined the faculty (as an 'außerordentlicher Professor'). In the same year, he traveled to Oxford in order to collate the Plato manuscripts there. In 1872 and 1873, he did research at Sapienza University of Rome and Ca' Foscari University of Venice.

In 1874, Schanz was promoted to a full professor ('ordentlicher Professor') in classical philology at the University of Würzburg. His research there won him great renown. He became a member of many scholarly societies and academies and was ennobled in 1900. In the academic year from 1901 to 1902, Schanz was rector of the university. In 1912, he was promoted to Geheimrat and retired.

== Scholarship ==
Schanz made enduring contributions to several areas of classical studies.

His unfinished edition of Plato’s dialogues, published in seven volumes between 1875 and 1887, was the result of many years of manuscript comparison conducted in Europe’s major libraries, combined with critical editorial analysis.

Schanz's magnum opus was, however, his four-volume History of Roman Literature (1875–1887). This replaced the obsolete and inconvenient work of Wilhelm Siegmund Teuffel and appeared in the Handbuch der Altertumswissenschaft. Schanz died while working on the second part of the last volume, which was completed by his successor at Würzburg, Carl Hosius. Even today, parts of Schanz's history remain indispensable.

In 1881, he published a still influential paper on stichometry. Three years before, Charles Graux had shown that the numbers found at the end of many medieval manuscripts represented the total number of 'standard lines' in each work. Just as modern books are measured in pages, ancient authors and scribes counted the lines in prose compositions. Each line was equal to a Greek hexameter (about 15 syllables or 35 letters). While studying the Clarke Codex of Plato's dialogues at Oxford, Schanz noticed that the isolated letters in the margins of two dialogues formed an alphabetic series and marked every hundredth standard line. He was able to show that other manuscripts had similar marginal markings and named this kind of line-counting 'partial stichometry' (in contrast to the total stichometry studied by Graux). Fifty years later, Ohly's definitive monograph on stichometry built on the pioneering work of Graux and Schanz and surveyed all the known total and partial stichometry in ancient manuscripts. Stichometry now plays a small but useful role in the study of ancient Greek and Latin papyri, and especially of the scrolls evacuated in Herculaneum.

Schanz's last great contribution was in the area of Greek syntax. From 1882 to 1912 he edited twenty volumes of the Beiträge zur historischen Syntax der griechischen Sprache.

== Honors ==
- 1882 Order of St. Michael
- 1883 Corresponding member of the Bayerische Akademie der Wissenschaften
- 1885 Honorary member of the Greek Society (Griechischen Gesellschaft) in Constantinople
- 1900 ennobled (Verdienstorden der Bayerischen Krone)
- 1904 Honorary member of the Accademia Properziana del Subasio in Assisi
- 1908 Rewarded a prize (Vallauripreis) by the Academy in Turin
- 1910 Corresponding member of the Accademia Virgiliana in Mantua
