= Camma Larsen-Ledet =

Danish politician (1915–1991)

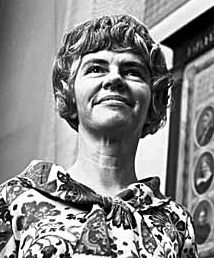
Camma Larsen-Ledet (1964)

Camma Sylvia Larsen-Ledet née Søgaard (22 October 1915, Esbjerg — 12 August 1991, Aabenraa) was a Danish politician who represented the Social Democratic Party. She was elected to the Folketing in 1964, becoming Minister for Family Affairs from 1966 to 1968. From 1970 to 1986, she was mayor of Aabenraa in the south of Jutland.

== Biography ==
Born on 22 October 1915 in Esbjerg, Camma Sylvia Søgaard was the daughter of Albert Poulsen Søgaard (1889–1950), a mechanic, and Lucia Catharina Jochumsen Holm (1879–1953), a seamstress. The second of three children, she was brought up in a modest home. After completing her middle school education, she was employed by the newspaper Vestkysten where she was trained as an office worker. In 1932, after passing the trade school examination, she was promoted to the sales department, ultimately becoming the secretary of the newspaper's editor Knud Ree, who later became fisheries minister.

In 1939, she married the journalist Clement Larsen-Ledet (1915–1984), gave up her job with Vestkysten, and moved with him to Southern Jutland. In 1945, they moved to Aabenraa where her husband became the local editor for the daily newspaper Sønderjyden. Initially she stayed at home raising their two children while developing an interest in politics. After becoming a member of the Social Democratic Party, she served on the party's local management board from 1954 to 1961, heading the Aabenraa women's committee (1957–1960).

From 1950, she became a member of the Aabenraa town council where she remained for 12 years, gaining increasing responsibilities. In addition, from 1953 to 1955, she was a member of the Danish Women's Society's national board and in 1964 she was elected to the Folketing as the member for Ribe and was re-elected in 1966. As such, she was one of the few female Social Democrats. In the government of Jens Otto Krag, she was appointed Minister of Family Affairs. She succeeded in bringing in new legislation on family allowances with higher compensation for lost earnings during pregnancy.

After failing to be re-elected in 1968, she once again devoted her attention to municipal affairs. Standing as the Social Democrat candidate as mayor of Aabenraa, she was elected in 1969, and served for the next 12 years. During her term, the urban area Høje Kolstrup was established and modern harbour facilities were created at Sønderjyllandskajen. As major, she proved to be an effective, authoritative speaker, capable of exerting leadership in a male-dominated environment.

Camma Larsen-Ledet died in Aabenraa on 12 August 1991. She is buried in Aabenraa Cemetery.
