= Diane F. Birt =

American nutritionist

- Born: October 12, 1949 (age 77); Petaluma, California, US
- Spouse: Kenneth Allen Birt (m. 1973)

Academic background
- Education: BA, 1971, Whittier College; PhD, 1975, Purdue University

Diane Feikert Birt (October 12, 1949) is an American nutritionist. Following her retirement in January 2015, Birt was named a fellow of the American Society for Nutrition and National Academy of Medicine.

== Early life and education ==
Birt was born on October 12, 1949, in Petaluma, California, to parents Dorothy Beatrice Cunningham and Joseph Ernst Feickert. She attended El Molino High School where she received a scholarship to attend Whittier College for her Bachelor's degree. Upon graduating, she married engineer Kenneth Allen Birt in 1973. She subsequently earned a Ph.D. in nutrition from Purdue University in 1975. In 2005, Birt was an inaugural inductee into the Purdue University Foods and Nutrition Department's Hall of Fame.

== Career ==
Following her PhD, Birt became an assistant professor in human nutrition at Iowa State University (ISU) before accepting a similar position at the University of Nebraska Medical Center's Eppley Institute for Research in Cancer to accommodate her husband's career transition. She eventually returned to ISU to serve as chairwoman of the food science and human nutrition department and was given the rank of Distinguished Professor. From 1997 until 2002, she direct their Center for Designing Foods to Improve Nutrition before being replaced by Paul Flakoll. Following his death in 2006, she was appointed its interim director and named to the Food and Nutrition Board.

Birt's research at ISU focused on the prevention of colon cancer through ingestion of resistant starches. She also investigated the bioactive and toxic agents in the plant genera Echinacea, Hypericum, and Prunella. Through her research studies, Birt demonstrated that the plant chemical apigenin protects people from ultraviolet light, thereby lowering the risk of contracting skin cancers. Following her retirement in January 2015, Birt was named a fellow of the American Society for Nutrition and National Academy of Medicine.
