= Birthe Olufsdatter =

Danish woman executed for witchcraft in 1620

Birthe Olufsdatter (died 1620), was a Danish woman who was executed for witchcraft in Ribe. The court protocol of the city of Ribe in the 1572-1652 period is the most well preserved of all documents describing the witch trials in Denmark, and has been a focus of study for the Danish witch trials.

== Case ==
The case of Birthe Olufsdatter belonged to the major witchcraft persecution that took place in Denmark in the 1620s, following the introduction of the strict Trolddomsforordningen af 1617 ('Witchcraft Act of 1617').

Birthe Olufsdatter was a poor homeless beggar in Ribe. She was reported by Morten Brunsvig, who accused her of having caused the illness and subsequent death of his late wife Volberg as revenge for Volger's refusal to give the homeless Birthe shelter.

Birthe Olufsdatter was charged with sorcery. Subjected to sorcery, the confessed herself guilty of sorcery. However, she gave no specifics about herself, nor did she name any of her accomplices. Birthe had a scar on her back that she claimed had been caused by a burning accident. The court called upon the professional folk healer Johanne Moltisdatter and asked her to examine a scar on the back of Birthe to assertain if it was a natural scar after a burn, as Birthe claimed, or a witch's mark.

Johanne Moltisdatter had been called simply as an expert witness, her being active as a healer and a medical professional. She stated that she was fully capable of judging if the scar was natural or not, since she had been given the ability to master magic and cause both life and death by Jesus Christ. She testified that Birthe Olufsdatter had previously consulted her about the scar, and that she, Johanne, could confirm that Birthe's scar was not caused by a burn accident, but had the mark of the Devil's hoof.

The testimony of Johanne Moltisdatter resulted in the court to sentence Birthe Olufsdatter to be executed by burning for witchcraft. However, it also caused Johanne Moltisdatter to be charged with sorcery herself, sentenced and executed, because of her own free confession that she could master magic.
