= Clinker Birt =

- Born: Rowland Sidnam Walter Birt; 9 August 1890 Glasgow
- Died: 5 June 1948 (aged 57)
- Occupation(s): firefighter and oysterman

Rugby union career
- Position: number eight
International career
Years	Team	Apps	(Points)
1914	Wallabies	1	(0)

Rowland Sidnam Walter "Clinker" Birt (9 August 1890 – 5 June 1948) was a rugby union player who represented Australia.

Birt, a number eight, was born in Glasgow and claimed one international rugby cap for Australia.
