= Birte Høeg Brask =

Danish resistance fighter and psychiatrist

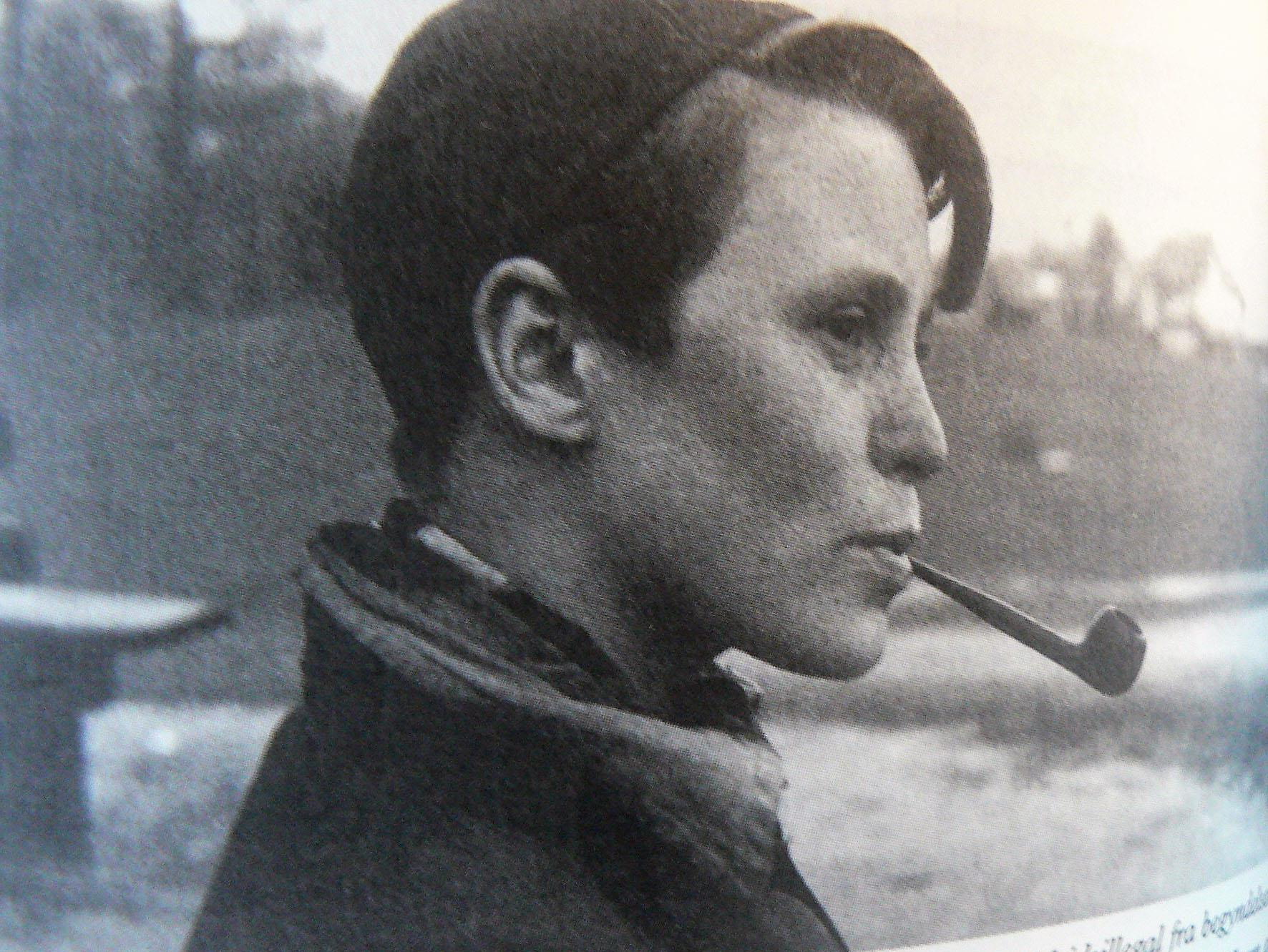
Birte Høeg Brask

Birte Høeg Brask nicknamed Trille (1918–1997) was a Danish resistance fighter and physician. During the German occupation of Denmark in World War II, she became a member of the Danish resistance. As a communist, after Germany attacked the Soviet Union in 1941, together with her husband Kjartan Munck, she contributed to the first clandestine publications in Denmark. She went on to collaborate with the writer and resistance fighter Børge Houmann, working as a courier, organizing illegal meetings and contributing to the resistance papers Land og Folk and Ugens Nyt. Continuing her studies after the war, she became a specialist at the children's psychiatric hospital in Aarhus. From 1970 until her retirement in 1988, she held the position of chief consultant. Høeg Brask is remembered in particular for her ground-breaking contributions to autism.

== Early life and education ==
Birte Høeg Brask (nicknamed Trille) was born in the Copenhagen district of Frederiksberg on 23 November 1918. She was the daughter of the laboratory director Axel Høeg Brask (1875–1942) and Emma Brincker (1879-1968). The youngest of three sisters, she was brought up in the Vesterbro district. While a student at Falkonergårdens Gymnasium, she became active in the left-wing Dansk Gymnasiastforbund (Danish High School Association). After matriculating in 1936, she studied medicine at the University of Copenhagen where she met Kjartan Munck, a communist.

== Career ==
She married Kjartan Munck in 1937 and had a son, Ole, in 1939.

In 1946, her marriage with Munck was dissolved. She became the life-long partner of Børge Kruuse Houmann (1902–1994) whom she married in 1962.

=== Resistance work ===
Høeg Brask showed interest in social and cultural radicalism from an early age. As a result, she was attracted to participating in illegal activities during the German occupation. After the German invasion of the Soviet Union, she became firmly committed to the resistance cause in the autumn of 1941. Together with her husband, she became involved in the distribution of Danske Toner, the first illegal paper in Denmark which was published by Børge Houmann, one of the early leaders and later head of the communist resistance movement. Using the cover name Mads, she became one of Houmann's closest associates for the remainder of the German occupation, organizing hiding and meeting places, clandestine printing operations and performing extensive courier work. She became a major contributor to the illegal publications Land og Folk and Ugens Nyt, based on information received from Kremlin radio broadcasts.

During the war, Høeg Brask put her son Ole into care in order to devote all her efforts to the resistance. She later regretted this decision.

=== Post-war career ===
After the war, Høeg Brask completed her medical studies, graduating in 1946. She became increasingly interested in pediatric psychiatry, becoming a specialist in 1957. From 1958, she headed the psychotic children's department in the newly established child psychiatric hospital in Aarhus. From 1970, she served as the hospital's chief consultant until her retirement in 1970. One of her colleagues, Vandborg Sørensen, commented: "As a human being, she was a fascinating person... Professionally, she was inspirational, because her insight into children with autism was so impressive." In 1988, an account of her work with psychotic children was published as Tilegnet Birte Høeg Brask: et skrift om psykotiske børn.

Høeg Brask died in Aarhus on 1 January 1997.
