= Birte Siim =

Danish political scientist in gender studies

Birte Siim (born 1945) is a Danish political scientist specializing in gender studies. From 2004 to 2018, she was professor at the Institute for Culture and Global Studies at Aalborg University where she managed FREIA, the Centre of Gender Research. Her numerous books and publications have addressed gender and politics from a European perspective. In addition to coordinating European Union projects, she has been active in the ECPR Standing Group on Gender and Politics.

== Biography ==
Born on 27 November 1945 in Esbjerg, Birte Siim studied political science at Aarhus University, graduating in 1974. In 1975, she joined the university's Department of Community Development and Planning. In 1985, she was a visiting professor at Stanford University's Center for Research on Women and, in spring 2003, at Bristol University's Department of Politics.

In 2004, Siim was appointed Professor of Gender Research in the Social Sciences at Aalborg University's Department of Culture and Global Studies where she remained until her retirement in 2018. She has participated in several European Union projects including BEUCitizen, RAGE and VEIL.

== Selected publications ==
Siim's many publications address gender and politics, democracy, citizenship and the welfare state:

- Siim, Birte (2000). Gender and Citizenship: Politics and Agency in France, Britain and Denmark. Cambridge University Press. ISBN 978-0-521-59843-9.
- Siim, Birte; Krasteva, Anna; Saarinen, Aino (2018). Citizens' Activism and Solidarity Movements: Contending with Populism. Springer. pp. 270–. ISBN 978-3-319-76183-1.

Recent publications from a European perspective include:

- Siim, Birte (2013): "Citizenship" in Oxford Handbook on Gender and Politics, Oxford University Press
- Siim, Birte; Mokre, Monika (2013). Negotiating Gender and Diversity in an Emergent European Public Sphere. Palgrave Macmillan. ISBN 978-0-230-35968-0.
- Siim, Birte; Rolandsen Agustin, L. (2014): "Gender Diversities – Practicing Intersectionality in the European Union". Ethnicities. (14) 4: 539–555;
- Siim, Birte (2014): "Conflicts and Negotiations about Framings of Gender and Ethnicity by Political Actors in the European Public Sphere", Journal of International and Comparative Social Policy, 2014 (30) 01
