= Birte Melsen =

Danish orthodontist

- Born: 9 June 1939 (age 86); Aabenraa, Denmark.
- Education: Royal Dental College
- Known for: Leading expert on Adult Orthodontics
- Medical career
- Profession: Dentist
- Institutions: Aarhus University
- Sub-specialties: orthodontics

Birte Melsen (born 9 June 1939) is an orthodontist from Denmark. She was the past President of European Orthodontic Society in 2004 and has made significant contributions in the field of orthodontics with her research, publishing about 350 papers in scientific journals on topics related to Anchorage (orthodontics) and adult orthodontics.

== Life and career ==
Birthe Melsen was born in Aabenraa, Denmark in 1939. She received her dental degree in 1964 from Aarhus University in Aarhus, Denmark. Melsen specialized in orthodontics in the year of 1971 and received her orthodontic certificate in 1974 from Royal Dental College. She became Head of Department of Orthodontics at the same college in 1975 and is currently serving at that position. Melsen also works as part-time at a private practice in Lübeck, Germany. She has published a textbook called Adult Orthodontics in 2012. Melsen and co-workers in Denmark, designed the Aarhus Mini-Implant (Medicon eG, Tuttlingen, Germany. ScanOrto A/S, Charlottenlund, Denmark) and furnished scientific evidence for the possibility of immediate loading of mini-screw implants.

== Awards ==
- Order of the Dannebrog, 1st degree, 2000
- Robert Strange Award in Orthodontics, 1986
- Jarabak Scholarship, 1986

== Positions held ==
- 1976 - President, Scandinavian Orthodontic Society
- 1984 - President, Nordic Orthodontic Society
- 1988 - President, Danish Orthodontic Society
- 1989 - President, Third International Symposium on Dentofacial Development, Aarhus, Denmark
- 1990 - Vice-president, European Orthodontic Society Congress, Copenhagen, Denmark
- 1993-96 vice-president of International Symposium on ComprehensiveManagement of Craniofacial Anomalies
- 1994-97 President of the Danish Orthodontic Society
- 1994 - Associate Editor of Orthodontics and Craniofacial Research
- 2004 - President, European Orthodontic Society
