= Charles Graux (classicist) =

French classicist (1852-1882)

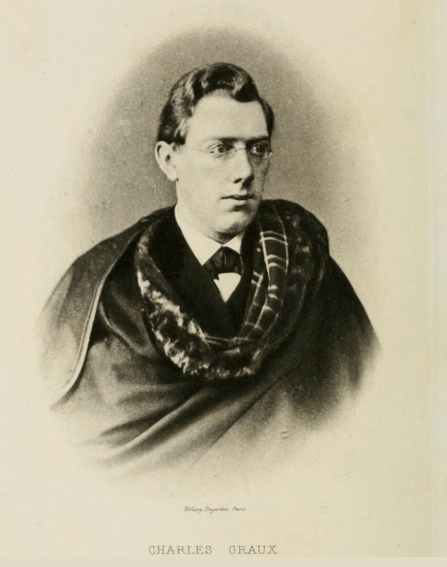
- French classicist and palaeographer, authority on stichometry
- Born: Charles Graux; 23 November 1852; Vervins, France
- Died: 8 January 1882 (aged 29); Paris, France
- Occupations: classicist, palaeographer

Charles Graux (23 November 1852 – 8 January 1882) was a French classicist and palaeographer. Apart from scores of articles and reviews, he published important critical editions of works by Xenophon and Plutarch and pioneering, descriptive catalogs of the medieval copies of ancient Greek texts preserved in the libraries of Spain and Denmark.

His most enduring contributions were to the history of ancient stichometry. In an article that Kurt Ohly called 'epoch-making' he proved that ancient Greek authors and scribes measured the length of prose texts in standard lines just as modern books are measured in pages and computer files in words. This standard unit, he showed, was equal in length to a Greek hexameter (about fifteen syllables or 35 letters). Graux’s survey of hundreds of ancient stichometric line-counts preserved in medieval manuscripts confirmed that the same standard line was in use from the fourth century BCE through the Christian authors of late antiquity. These results launched the rigorous study of ancient stichometry during the golden age of papyrology and led to Ohly’s definitive monograph fifty years later. Stichometry now plays a small but useful role in the study of ancient Greek and Latin papyri, and especially of the scrolls evacuated in Herculaneum.

Charles Graux was born in Vervins, France. He studied for three years at the École pratique des hautes études from 1871 and became a teacher there in 1874. In 1881, he earned a doctorate for his work and was appointed to a teaching position at the Sorbonne. He was an editor for several leading journals. With funding from the French government, he made his first 'scientific mission' to Spain in 1875-6 to study and catalog the Greek manuscripts in the national collections. He was received by the Spanish king and visited 60 libraries. He 'discovered' or at least brought to the attention of modern scholars some 450 Greek manuscripts. He later traveled to Sweden and Denmark and made two more voyages to Spain. On a trip to Italy, he apparently contracted typhoid fever and died in Paris at the age of 29.
