= 1982 in Dutch television =

This is a list of Dutch television related events from 1982.

== Events ==
- 24 February – Bill van Dijk is selected to represent Netherlands at the 1982 Eurovision Song Contest with his song "Jij en ik". He is selected to be the twenty-seventh Dutch Eurovision entry during Nationaal Songfestival held at Circustheater in Scheveningen.
- 24 April – Germany win the Eurovision Song Contest with the song "Ein bißchen Frieden" by Nicole. The Netherlands finish in sixteenth place with their entry "Jij en ik" by Bill van Dijk.

== Television shows ==
=== 1950s ===
- NOS Journaal (1956–present)

=== 1970s ===
- Sesamstraat (1976–present)

=== 1980s ===
- Jeugdjournaal (1981–present)

== Births ==
- 6 February – Lieke van Lexmond, model, actress, TV presenter & singer.
- 25 February – Aukje van Ginneken, actress & singer
- 28 June – Gigi Ravelli, actress & TV presenter
