= Netherlands in the Eurovision Song Contest 1982 =

- Eurovision Song Contest 1982
- Participating broadcaster: Nederlandse Omroep Stichting (NOS)
- Country: Netherlands
- Selection process: Nationaal Songfestival 1982
- Selection date: 24 February 1982

Competing entry
- Song: "Jij en ik"
- Artist: Bill van Dijk
- Songwriters: Dick Bakker; Liselore Gerritsen

Placement
- Final result: 16th, 8 points

Participation chronology

The Netherlands was represented at the Eurovision Song Contest 1982 with the song "Jij en ik", composed by Dick Bakker, with lyrics by Liselore Gerritsen, and performed by Bill van Dijk. The Dutch participating broadcaster, Nederlandse Omroep Stichting (NOS), selected its entry through a national final. The song and performer were chosen independently of each other at the national final.

Although "Jij en ik" performed poorly at Eurovision and was forgotten immediately after, "Fantasie eiland", which had finished second in the Dutch national final, was picked up by British record producer Tim Friese-Greene, recorded in English (as "Fantasy Island") by the group Tight Fit, and became a top 5 hit in the UK and also a chart success in Ireland.

== Before Eurovision ==
=== Nationaal Songfestival 1982 ===
Nederlandse Omroep Stichting (NOS) held the national final at the Circustheater in Scheveningen, hosted by the 1969 Eurovision winner Lenny Kuhr. It consisted of three acts and three songs, with each act performing each song, giving nine performances in total. Firstly, a seven-member jury, which included former Eurovision entrants Ben Cramer and Getty Kaspers (lead singer of Teach-In), each chose their favourite song; then the choice of performer was made by 12 regional juries who each had 10 points to divide between the artists.

Song selection – 24 February 1982
R/O	Song	Points	Place
1	"Pierement"	0	3
2	"Jij en ik"	4	1
3	"Fantasie eiland"	3	2

Artist selection – 24 February 1982
R/O	Artist	Points	Place
1	Bill van Dijk	65	1
2	Bonnie St. Claire	30	2
3	The Millionaires	25	3

== At Eurovision ==
On the night of the final van Dijk performed 16th in the running order, following Israel and preceding Ireland. At the close of voting "Jij en ik" had received just 8 points, placing the Netherlands 16th of the 18 entries, ahead only of Denmark and Finland. The Dutch jury awarded its 12 points to Cyprus.

The contest was broadcast on Nederland 2, with commentary by Pim Jacobs.

The Dutch conductor at the contest was Rogier van Otterloo.

=== Voting ===
Points awarded to the Netherlands
Score	Country
12 points	
10 points	
8 points	
7 points	
6 points	
5 points	Germany
4 points	
3 points	Sweden
2 points	
1 point	

Points awarded by the Netherlands
Score	Country
12 points	Cyprus
10 points	Switzerland
8 points	Israel
7 points	Luxembourg
6 points	Germany
5 points	Sweden
4 points	Portugal
3 points	Belgium
2 points	Turkey
1 point	United Kingdom
