= Israel in the Eurovision Song Contest 1982 =

- Eurovision Song Contest 1982
- Participating broadcaster: Israel Broadcasting Authority (IBA)
- Country: Israel
- Selection process: Kdam Eurovision 1982
- Selection date: 3 April 1982

Competing entry
- Song: "Hora"
- Artist: Avi Toledano
- Songwriters: Avi Toledano; Yoram Taharlev

Placement
- Final result: 2nd, 100 points

Participation chronology

Israel was represented at the Eurovision Song Contest 1982 with the song "Hora", composed by Avi Toledano, with lyrics by Yoram Taharlev, and performed by Toledano himself. The Israeli participating broadcaster, the Israel Broadcasting Authority (IBA), selected its entry for the contest through Kdam Eurovision 1982.

At Eurovision, the song came second, having received 100 points. He had previously participated in the 1981 national final with the song "Karnaval".

== Before Eurovision ==
=== Kdam Eurovision 1982 ===
The Israel Broadcasting Authority (IBA) final to select their entry was held on 3 March 1982 in the Jerusalem Theater in Jerusalem, and was hosted by Daniel Pe'er. The votes of seven regional juries across Israel decided the winner. Each place had a jury who awarded 12, 10, 8, 7, 6, 5, 4, 3, 2, 1 point(s) for their top ten songs.

The winning entry was "Hora", performed by Avi Toledano and also composed by him, with lyrics written by Yoram Taharlev.

Final – 3 April 1982
R/O	Artist	Song	Points	Place
1	Yardena Arazi	"Musica nisheret" (מוזיקה נשארת)	67	2
2	Izhar Cohen	"El ha'or" (אל האור)	31	7
3	Svika Pick	"Romantica" (רומנטיקה)	36	6
4	The Brothers & the Sisters	"Romeo veYulia" (רומיאו ויוליה)	38	5
5	Sassi Keshet & Psagot	"Himalaya" (הימלאיה)	46	4
6	Kesem	"Boomerang" (בומרנג)	11	11
7	Avi Toledano	"Hora" (הורה)	72	1
8	Sexta	"Ken velav" (כן ולאו)	4	12
9	Yoav Shemer	"Mangina la'olam" (מנגינה לעולם)	14	8
10	Yigal Bashan	"Ze harega" (זה הרגע)	13	9
11	Haim Zadok	"Kor'im la ahava" (קוראים לה אהבה)	13	9
12	Isolir Band	"Melody" (מלודי)	61	3

Detailed Regional Jury Votes
R/O	Song	Rishon LeZion	Tel Aviv	Kiryat Shmona	Haifa	Ashkelon	Jerusalem	Ashdot Ya'akov	Total
1	"Musica nisheret"	10	12	10	7	10	6	12	67
2	"El ha'or"	2	4	4	5	5	4	7	31
3	"Romantica"	6	6	5	6		7	6	36
4	"Romeo veYulia"	4	5	6	8	7	3	5	38
5	"Himalaya"	12	7	7	1	6	10	3	46
6	"Boomerang"	5	2	1		4	1		11
7	"Hora"	8	10	8	12	12	12	10	72
8	"Ken velav"			3				1	4
9	"Mangina la'olam"		3	2	3	4	2		14
10	"Ze harega"	3	1		4	3		2	13
11	"Kor'im la ahava"	1			2	1	5	4	13
12	"Melody"	7	8	12	10	8	8	8	61
Spokespersons
Rishon LeZion – Dani Lewinstein; Tel-Aviv – Rafi Ginat; Kiryat Shmona – Haim Hecht; Haifa – Meir Einstein; Ashkelon – Moshe Timor; Jerusalem – Yarin Kimor; Ashdot Ya'akov – Benny Uri

== At Eurovision ==
On the night of the final at the Harrogate International Centre, Avi Toledano performed 15th in the running order, following Yugoslavia and preceding the Netherlands. At the close of voting, "Hora" had received 100 points, placing Israel in second out of a field of 18 competing countries, 61 points behind Germany's winner Nicole. The Israeli jury awarded its 12 points to Germany. IBA appointed Yitzhak Shim'oni as its spokesperson to announce the result of the Israeli vote in the final.

=== Voting ===
Points awarded to Israel
Score	Country
12 points	Finland; Germany
10 points	Luxembourg; Portugal; Sweden; Switzerland
8 points	Netherlands
7 points	Austria; Belgium
6 points	Spain
5 points	
4 points	
3 points	Yugoslavia
2 points	Cyprus
1 point	Denmark; Norway; United Kingdom

Points awarded by Israel
Score	Country
12 points	Germany
10 points	Switzerland
8 points	Spain
7 points	Cyprus
6 points	Belgium
5 points	Luxembourg
4 points	Austria
3 points	Ireland
2 points	United Kingdom
1 point	Portugal
