= Belgium in the Eurovision Song Contest 1982 =

- Eurovision Song Contest 1982
- Participating broadcaster: Radio-télévision belge de la Communauté française (RTBF)
- Country: Belgium
- Selection process: National final
- Selection date: 21 February 1982

Competing entry
- Song: "Si tu aimes ma musique"
- Artist: Stella
- Songwriters: Fred Bekky; Rony Brack; Bobott; Jo May

Placement
- Final result: 4th, 96 points

Participation chronology

Belgium was represented at the Eurovision Song Contest 1982 with the song "Si tu aimes ma musique", composed by Fred Bekky, Rony Brack, and Bobott, with lyrics by Jo May and Bobott, and performed by Dutch singer Stella. The Belgian participating broadcaster, Walloon Radio-télévision belge de la Communauté française (RTBF), selected its entry through a national final. This was Stella's third appearance at Eurovision: She had appeared as part of the group Hearts of Soul for the Netherlands in 1970 and of Dream Express for Belgium in 1977. As a solo singer, she had also taken part in the 1981 Belgian national final.

== Before Eurovision ==
=== National final ===
The selection of the Belgian entry took place during five episodes of the popular music programme Palmarès. The show was broadcast weekly on Sundays, and the five episodes between 24 January 1982 and 21 February 1982 were dedicated to selecting the Belgian entry for the Eurovision Song Contest 1982. The competition consisted of three heats, a semi-final, and a final. Radio-télévision belge de la Communauté française (RTBF) held all the shows at its studios in Brussels, hosted by Pierre Collard-Bovy, and the songs were all presented in pre-recorded videos.

==== Competing entries ====
A 12-member jury with people from the television and radio industry, journalists, and representatives from SABAM selected 18 entries out of 156 submissions.

Artist	Song	Songwriter(s)
Baxter	"Plus personne n'y croit"	Sylvain Vanholme; Bichou
Chrome 17	"Intuition"	J.M. Xhenseval; N. Loureiro-Covas
Claude Michel	"Si par bonheur"	Frédéric François; Miele
Cologne Intime	"Boomerang"	Charles Roguery
Cricha	"Lucifer"	Freddy Nieuland; Igor Minarief
Eddy Pascal	"Même"	Eddy Pascal
Frank Michael	"Toi simplement toi"	Frank Michael; Jos Vanesse; Rosario Marino
Freddy Nieuland	"Les mots chantent"	Freddy Nieuland
Gala	"Patati patata"	Jean-Luc Gardian
Isabelle Rigaux	"Partir"	Isabelle Rigaux; Anne-Marie Gaspard
Jacky Lafon	"On l'appelle chanson d'amour"	Peter Laine; Alain Darmor
Joseph Cioppa	"Vivons l'amour de demain"	Joseph Cioppa
Nicole Mery	"Quelle surprise"	B.M. Heinz; Phil Francis
Pascal Amory	"Slow en tendresse"	Marc Delisie; J. Baugniet
Serge Mohimont	"Au fond de ma mémoire"	Serge Mohimont
Shema	"Mon joujou"	Jean-Marie Ongaro; Alain Deré
Stella	"Si tu aimes ma musique"	Fred Beekmans; Bob Baelemans
Tiziano	"Par amour"	Frédéric François; Miele

==== Heats ====
The heats took place on 24 January, 31 January, and 7 February 1982 and were broadcast for 30 minutes from 17:30 (CET). Six competing acts performed in each show and the top two as decided by televoting advanced to the semi-final. Televoting was only open for just over an hour and the results of each show were announced in a short show at 19:24 (CET) on the day of each heat.

Heat 1 – 24 January 1982
R/O	Artist	Song	Result
1	Stella	"Si tu aimes ma musique"	Qualified
2	Joseph Cioppa	"Vivons l'amour de demain"	Qualified
3	Frank Michael	"Toi simplement toi"	—N/a
4	Shema	"Mon joujou"	—N/a
5	Cricha	"Lucifer"	—N/a
6	Freddy Nieuland	"Les mots chantent"	—N/a

Heat 2 – 31 January 1982
R/O	Artist	Song	Result
1	Claude Michel	"Si par bonheur"	Qualified
2	Gala	"Patati patata"	—N/a
3	Pascal Amory	"Slow en tendresse"	Qualified
4	Chrome 17	"Intuition"	—N/a
5	Nicole Mery	"Quelle surprise"	—N/a
6	Eddy Pascal	"Même"	—N/a

Heat 3 – 7 February 1982
R/O	Artist	Song	Result
1	Tiziano	"Par amour"	Qualified
2	Cologne Intime	"Boomerang"	—N/a
3	Baxter	"Plus personne n'y croit"	Qualified
4	Jacky Lafon	"On l'appelle chanson d'amour"	—N/a
5	Serge Mohimont	"Au fond de ma mémoire"	—N/a
6	Isabelle Rigaux	"Partir"	—N/a

==== Semi-final ====
The semi-final took place on 14 February 1982 and was broadcast for 30 minutes at 17:30 (CET). The six entries which had qualified from the heats competed and the top four entries as decided by televoting advanced to the final. Televoting was only open for just over an hour and the results of the semi-final were announced in a short show at 19:24 (CET) on the same day.

Semi-final – 14 February 1982
R/O	Artist	Song	Result
1	Claude Michel	"Si par bonheur"	—N/a
2	Stella	"Si tu aimes ma musique"	Qualified
3	Pascal Amory	"Slow en tendresse"	—N/a
4	Joseph Cioppa	"Vivons l'amour de demain"	Qualified
5	Tiziano	"Par amour"	Qualified
6	Baxter	"Plus personne n'y croit"	Qualified

==== Final ====
The final was held on 21 February 1982 and was broadcast for 30 minutes at 17:35 (CET). The winning song was chosen by the same 12-member jury panel which had selected the 18 songs from the received submissions and the results of the final were announced in a short show at 20:10 (CET) on the same day.

Final – 21 February 1982
R/O	Artist	Song	Place
1	Stella	"Si tu aimes ma musique"	1
2	Baxter	"Plus personne n'y croit"	2
3	Tiziano	"Par amour"	3
4	Joseph Cioppa	"Vivons l'amour de demain"	4

== At Eurovision ==
On the night of the final Stella performed 11th in the running order, following Austria and preceding Spain. At the close of the voting "Si tu aimes ma musique" had received 96 points, placing Belgium 4th of the 18 entries. Although the song did not receive any 12 points votes (the highest were 10 from Denmark and Spain), it achieved the distinction of being only the eighth song in Eurovision history to that date (and only the third non-winner) to receive points from every other participating country (excluding the 1971-1973 contests where each country had to award a minimum of 2 points to every song). The Belgian jury awarded its 12 points to Switzerland.

=== Voting ===
Points awarded to Belgium
Score	Country
12 points	
10 points	Denmark; Spain
8 points	Cyprus; Portugal
7 points	Sweden; Yugoslavia
6 points	Israel; Turkey
5 points	Finland; Luxembourg; Norway
4 points	Austria; Germany; Ireland
3 points	Netherlands
2 points	Switzerland; United Kingdom
1 point	

Points awarded by Belgium
Score	Country
12 points	Switzerland
10 points	Germany
8 points	Luxembourg
7 points	Israel
6 points	Austria
5 points	Sweden
4 points	Spain
3 points	Cyprus
2 points	Norway
1 point	Yugoslavia
