= Eurovision Song Contest 1982 =

International song competition

Date and venue
- Final: 24 April 1982
- Venue: Harrogate International Centre; Harrogate, United Kingdom

Organisation
- Organiser: European Broadcasting Union (EBU)
- Scrutineer: Frank Naef

Production
- Host broadcaster: British Broadcasting Corporation (BBC)
- Director: Michael Hurll
- Executive producer: Michael Hurll
- Musical director: Ronnie Hazlehurst
- Presenter: Jan Leeming

Participants
- Number of entries: 18
- Non-returning countries: France; Greece
- Participation map: Competing countries Countries that participated in the past but not in 1982

Vote
- Voting system: Each country awarded 12, 10, 8-1 point(s) to their 10 favourite songs
- Winning song: Germany "Ein bißchen Frieden"

The Eurovision Song Contest 1982 was the 27th edition of the Eurovision Song Contest, held on 24 April 1982 at the Harrogate International Centre in Harrogate, United Kingdom, and presented by Jan Leeming. It was organised by the European Broadcasting Union (EBU) and host broadcaster the British Broadcasting Corporation (BBC), who staged the event after winning the 1981 contest for the United Kingdom with the song "Making Your Mind Up" by Bucks Fizz.

Broadcasters from eighteen countries participated in the contest with Greece deciding not to enter this year, while France was absent for the second time in contest history, due to internal issues regarding a reform of national telecommunications laws, meaning that there was no broadcaster that could participate on its behalf.

The winner was Germany with the song "Ein bißchen Frieden" by Nicole. This was the first time that Germany had won the contest after having competed every year since the contest's inception. Germany received 1.61 times as many points as runner-up Israel, which was a record under the current scoring system until 2009, when Norway received 1.78 times as many points as Iceland. The song also cemented Ralph Siegel and Bernd Meinunger, the song's composers, into German Eurovision tradition, writing 18 Eurovision songs between them before and after "Ein bißchen Frieden", 13 of which were for Germany.

== Location ==
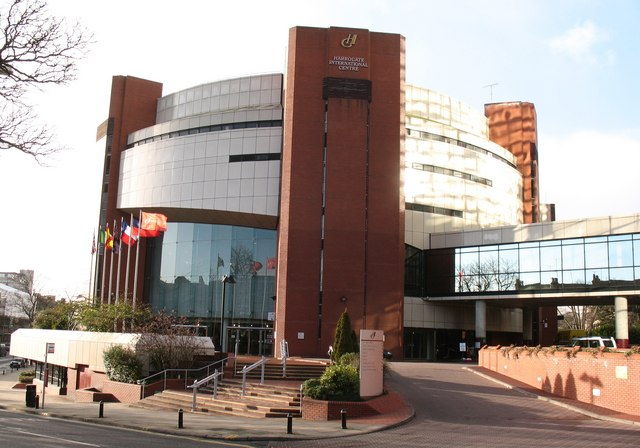
Harrogate International Centre, Harrogate - host venue of the 1982 contest.

Harrogate is a spa town in North Yorkshire, England. Historically in the West Riding of Yorkshire, the town is a tourist destination and its visitor attractions include its spa waters and RHS Harlow Carr gardens. Nearby is the Yorkshire Dales national park and the Nidderdale AONB. Harrogate grew out of two smaller settlements, High Harrogate and Low Harrogate, in the 17th century. The town became known as 'The English Spa' in the Georgian Era, after its waters were discovered in the 16th century. In the 17th and 18th centuries its 'chalybeate' waters (containing iron) were a popular health treatment, and the influx of wealthy but sickly visitors contributed significantly to the wealth of the town.

The Harrogate International Centre was chosen as the host venue for the contest. The grand convention and exhibition centre opened a short time prior to the contest, and was the first big event held in the main 2000-seat auditorium. Only 50 local people would see the contest in person, with most seats filled out with delegations and civic dignitaries.

== Participants ==
Eurovision Song Contest 1982 – Participation summaries by country
- Austria; Belgium; Cyprus; Denmark; Finland; Germany; ~~Greece~~; Ireland; Israel; Luxembourg; Netherlands; Norway; Portugal; Spain; Sweden; Switzerland; Turkey; United Kingdom; Yugoslavia

With 18 participating countries, this was the last Eurovision contest to have such a low number of entries.

Greece was due to participate in the contest with the song "Sarantapente kopelies" performed by Themis Adamantidis. Although drawn to perform in position number 2, Hellenic Broadcasting Corporation (ERT) withdrew a few weeks before the contest. According to press reports, Greek Minister of Culture and Sports Melina Mercouri had voiced her opposition to the chosen entry as being too low in quality.

In November 1981, the French participating broadcaster, Télévision Française 1 (TF1), declined to enter the Eurovision Song Contest 1982, with the head of entertainment, Pierre Bouteiller, saying, "The absence of talent and the mediocrity of the songs is where annoyance sets in. [Eurovision is] a monument to insanity [sometimes translated as "drivel"]." Antenne 2 became the new French participating broadcaster after public outcry, entering the contest for the first time in 1983.

Several of the performing artists had previously competed as lead artists representing the same country in past editions: Anita Skorgan had represented Norway in 1977 and in 1979, and had provided backing vocals in 1981; Jahn Teigen had represented Norway in 1978; Fatima Padinha and Teresa Miguel, members of Doce, had represented Portugal in 1978 as part of Gemini; Sally Ann Triplett, a member of Bardo, had represented the United Kingdom in 1980 as part of Prima Donna. In addition, Anna Vissi representing Cyprus, had represented Greece in 1980 along with the Epikouri; and Stella Maessen representing Belgium, had represented the Netherlands in 1970 as part of Hearts of Soul and Belgium in 1977 as part of Dream Express. Olcayto Ahmet Tuğsuz, who represented Turkey in 1978 as part of Nazar, provided backing vocals for Turkey.

Eurovision Song Contest 1982 participants
Country	Broadcaster	Artist	Song	Language	Songwriter(s)	Conductor
Austria	ORF	Mess	"Sonntag"	German	Rudolf Leve; Michael Scheickl	Richard Oesterreicher
Belgium	RTBF	Stella	"Si tu aimes ma musique"	French	Fred Bekky; Bobott; Rony Brack	Jack Say
Cyprus	CyBC	Anna Vissi	"Mono i agapi" (Μόνο η αγάπη)	Greek	Anna Vissi	Martyn Ford
Denmark	DR	Brixx	"Video-Video"	Danish	Jens Brixtofte	Allan Botschinsky
Finland	YLE	Kojo	"Nuku pommiin"	Finnish	Juice Leskinen; Jim Pembroke	Ossi Runne
Germany	BR (Note: On behalf of the German public broadcasting consortium ARD)	Nicole	"Ein bißchen Frieden"	German	Bernd Meinunger; Ralph Siegel	Norbert Daum
Ireland	RTÉ	The Duskeys	"Here Today, Gone Tomorrow"	English	Sally Keating	Noel Kelehan
Israel	IBA	Avi Toledano	"Hora" (הורה)	Hebrew	Yoram Taharlev; Avi Toledano	Silvio Nanssi Brandes
Luxembourg	CLT	Svetlana	"Cours après le temps"	French	Cyril Assous; Michel Jouveaux	Jean Claudric
Netherlands	NOS	Bill van Dijk	"Jij en ik"	Dutch	Dick Bakker; Liselore Gerritsen	Rogier van Otterloo
Norway	NRK	Jahn Teigen and Anita Skorgan	"Adieu"	Norwegian	Herodes Falsk; Jahn Teigen	Sigurd Jansen
Portugal	RTP	Doce	"Bem bom"	Portuguese	Pedro Brito; Tozé Brito; António Avelar de Pinho	Luis Duarte
Spain	TVE	Lucía	"Él"	Spanish	Paco Cepero; Ignacio Román	Miguel Ángel Varona
Sweden	SVT	Chips	"Dag efter dag"	Swedish	Monica Forsberg; Lasse Holm	Anders Berglund
Switzerland	SRG SSR	Arlette Zola	"Amour on t'aime"	French	Pierre Alain; Alain Morisod	Joan Amils
Turkey	TRT	Neco	"Hani?"	Turkish	Faik Tuğsuz; Olcayto Ahmet Tuğsuz	Garo Mafyan
United Kingdom	BBC	Bardo	"One Step Further"	English	Simon Jefferies	Ronnie Hazlehurst
Yugoslavia	JRT	Aska	"Halo, halo" (Хало, хало)	Serbo-Croatian	Aleksandar Ilić; Miroslav Popović	Zvonimir Skerl

== Format ==
The overall costs to organize the contest was £500,000.

The opening of the contest showed a map of Europe, with the translation "Where is Harrogate?" popping up on-screen from the languages of the participating countries. The question was always in the language in which the respective country's song was performed, with the exception of Ireland. The Irish entry was sung in English, but the translation of the question in the map was in Irish. Then the map zoomed into Harrogate's location in Yorkshire, followed by an introduction video spotlighting the town.

This year, before the postcard of a specific country (with the exceptions of Israel, who had no commentator, and Yugoslavia, whose commentators were in their own country), the camera would zoom into the commentary box of that country's broadcaster, where the commentator/s would give a hand gesture, e.g. wave. The postcard would start with the country's flag on the screen and an excerpt of the country's national anthem (though in the case of the host country, the UK, the song played was "Land of Hope and Glory" instead of "God Save the Queen", while the Israeli postcard began with an excerpt of "Hava Nagila" instead of "Hatikvah"). The postcards themselves, utilizing state-of-the-art video technology (for its time), were a montage of footage of the artist in Harrogate town or at the International Flower Festival. Some of the postcards also incorporated footage from the preview videos submitted by each participating broadcaster; only preview videos which did not consist of a performance of the song from a national final were used. Apart the national anthem, the postcards also used either a popular song or tune from the country being shown or a song performed at previous editions of Eurovision (i.e. for the Yugoslav entry, "Jedan dan" from 1968 was used, and for Israel, the winning song "Hallelujah" by Milk and Honey from 1979 was used). After the conclusion of the video clip, Jan Leeming introduced the conductor and then the artist for each nation.

== Contest overview ==
After coming second in the Hague in 1980 and in Dublin in 1981, Ralph Siegel and Bernd Meinunger took the first win for Germany. The country led the voting process from start to finish, with no competing country threatening at any point. At the end of 204 available points, Germany had gained 161, with Israel finishing with 100 in second place. For the winning country, this moment was also historic because around 13 million people in West Germany were tuned in to their televisions at that exact moment.

Nicole went on to sing the reprise of her song in English, French and Dutch, as well as German. The English version (also produced by Siegel and Robert Jung) of her Eurovision winner, "A Little Peace", subsequently shot to No. 1 in the UK Singles Chart.

Results of the Eurovision Song Contest 1982
R/O	Country	Artist	Song	Points	Place
1	Portugal	Doce	"Bem bom"	32	13
2	Luxembourg	Svetlana	"Cours après le temps"	78	6
3	Norway	Jahn Teigen and Anita Skorgan	"Adieu"	40	12
4	United Kingdom	Bardo	"One Step Further"	76	7
5	Turkey	Neco	"Hani?"	20	15
6	Finland	Kojo	"Nuku pommiin"	0	18
7	Switzerland	Arlette Zola	"Amour on t'aime"	97	3
8	Cyprus	Anna Vissi	"Mono i agapi"	85	5
9	Sweden	Chips	"Dag efter dag"	67	8
10	Austria	Mess	"Sonntag"	57	9
11	Belgium	Stella	"Si tu aimes ma musique"	96	4
12	Spain	Lucía	"Él"	52	10
13	Denmark	Brixx	"Video-Video"	5	17
14	Yugoslavia	Aska	"Halo, halo"	21	14
15	Israel	Avi Toledano	"Hora"	100	2
16	Netherlands	Bill van Dijk	"Jij en ik"	8	16
17	Ireland	The Duskeys	"Here Today, Gone Tomorrow"	49	11
18	Germany	Nicole	"Ein bißchen Frieden"	161	1

=== Spokespersons ===
Each participating broadcaster appointed a spokesperson who was responsible for announcing the votes for its respective country via telephone. Known spokespersons at the 1982 contest are listed below.

- Finland – Solveig Herlin
- Ireland – John Skehan
- Spain – Marisa Medina
- Sweden – Arne Weise
- Turkey – Başak Doğru
- United Kingdom – Colin Berry

== Detailed voting results ==
Each participating broadcaster assembled a jury who awarded 12, 10, 8, 7, 6, 5, 4, 3, 2, 1 point(s) for their top ten songs.

Detailed voting results
		Total score	Portugal	Luxembourg	Norway	United Kingdom	Turkey	Finland	Switzerland	Cyprus	Sweden	Austria	Belgium	Spain	Denmark	Yugoslavia	Israel	Netherlands	Ireland	Germany
Contestants	Portugal	32		7		4	5	2	1		6						1	4	2	
Contestants	Luxembourg	78	6		7	6	3	7				2	8	5	4		5	7	10	8
Contestants	Norway	40		6						4	4	6	2	2					6	10
Contestants	United Kingdom	76	4	12	6		10	4	5	3		12		1	2	6	2	1	7	1
Contestants	Turkey	20		8	3			1	3			3						2		
Contestants	Finland	0																		
Contestants	Switzerland	97	2	2	4	12	2			6	2	10	12		7	10	10	10	8	
Contestants	Cyprus	85	5	4	12	3		8	8			5	3	7		5	7	12		6
Contestants	Sweden	67	7	3	8	5		3	4			8	5	4	8	2		5	3	2
Contestants	Austria	57				10	7			7			6	8	6	4	4		5	
Contestants	Belgium	96	8	5	5	2	6	5	2	8	7	4		10	10	7	6	3	4	4
Contestants	Spain	52		1			8	6	7	10			4			1	8			7
Contestants	Denmark	5	3								1								1	
Contestants	Yugoslavia	21					4			1	12		1		3					
Contestants	Israel	100	10	10	1	1		12	10	2	10	7	7	6	1	3		8		12
Contestants	Netherlands	8									3									5
Contestants	Ireland	49	1		2	7	1		6	5	5			3	5	8	3			3
Contestants	Germany	161	12		10	8	12	10	12	12	8	1	10	12	12	12	12	6	12	

=== 12 points ===
Below is a summary of all 12 points in the final:

N.	Contestant	Nation(s) giving 12 points
9	Germany	Cyprus, Denmark, Ireland, Israel, Portugal, Spain, Switzerland, Turkey, Yugoslavia
2	Cyprus	Netherlands, Norway
2	Israel	Finland, Germany
2	Switzerland	Belgium, United Kingdom
2	United Kingdom	Austria, Luxembourg
1	Yugoslavia	Sweden

== Broadcasts ==
Each participating broadcaster was required to relay the contest via its networks. Non-participating EBU member broadcasters were also able to relay the contest as "passive participants". Broadcasters were able to send commentators to provide coverage of the contest in their own native language and to relay information about the artists and songs to their television viewers.

The contest was reportedly broadcast in 31 countries, including the participating countries, Greece, Jordan, and Tunisia; and Bulgaria, Czechoslovakia, Hungary, Poland, Romania, and the Soviet Union via Intervision; with approximately 300 million television viewers and 200 million radio listeners following the contest. Known details on the broadcasts in each country, including the specific broadcasting stations and commentators are shown in the tables below.

Broadcasters and commentators in participating countries
Country	Broadcaster	Channel(s)	Commentator(s)	Ref(s)
Austria	ORF	FS2	Ernst Grissemann	
Belgium	RTBF	RTBF1	Jacques Mercier	
Belgium	RTBF	RTBF 1, Bruxelles 21		
Belgium	BRT	TV1	Luc Appermont	
Belgium	BRT	BRT 2 Omroep Brabant		
Cyprus	CyBC	RIK	Fryni Papadopoulou and John Vickers	
Denmark	DR	DR TV	Jørgen de Mylius	
Finland	YLE	TV1	Erkki Toivanen	
Finland	YLE	Rinnakkaisohjelma		
Germany	ARD	Deutsches Fernsehen	Ado Schlier	
Ireland	RTÉ	RTÉ 1	Larry Gogan	
Ireland	RTÉ	RTÉ Radio 1	Pat Kenny	
Israel	IBA	Israeli Television, Reshet Bet		
Luxembourg	CLT	RTL Télé-Luxembourg	Jacques Navadic and Marylène Bergmann	
Netherlands	NOS	Nederland 2	Pim Jacobs	
Norway	NRK	NRK Fjernsynet	Bjørn Scheele	
Norway	NRK	NRK (Note: Deferred broadcast at 22:40 (CEST))	Erik Heyerdahl	
Portugal	RTP	RTP1	Fialho Gouveia	
Spain	TVE	TVE 1	Miguel de los Santos	
Sweden	SVT	TV1	Ulf Elfving	
Sweden	RR	SR P3	Kent Finell	
Switzerland	SRG SSR	TV DRS (Note: Broadcast through a second audio programme on TSR)	Theodor Haller	
Switzerland	SRG SSR	TSR	Georges Hardy	
Switzerland	SRG SSR	TSI	Giovanni Bertini	
Turkey	TRT	TRT Televizyon	Ümit Tunçağ	
United Kingdom	BBC	BBC1	Terry Wogan	
United Kingdom	BBC	BBC Radio 2 (Note: Simulcast on BBC Radio 1 VHF, BBC Radio Carlisle, BBC Radio Cleveland, BBC Radio Leicester, BBC Radio Manchester, BBC Radio Merseyside, BBC Radio Newcastle, BBC Radio London, BBC Radio Oxford, BBC Radio Solent, BBC Radio Stoke, and BBC Radio WM.)	Ray Moore	
Yugoslavia	JRT	TV Beograd 1, TV Novi Sad, TV Zagreb 1	Oliver Mlakar	
Yugoslavia	JRT	TV Koper-Capodistria		
Yugoslavia	JRT	TV Ljubljana 1		

Broadcasters and commentators in non-participating countries
Country	Broadcaster	Channel(s)	Commentator(s)	Ref(s)
Czechoslovakia	ČST	I. program (Note: Delayed broadcast on 21 May 1982 at 22:00 (CEST))		
Hungary	MTV	MTV1 (Note: Delayed broadcast on 15 May 1982 at 21:10 (CEST))		
Iceland	RÚV	Sjónvarpið (Note: Delayed broadcast on 30 April 1982 at 22:10 (WET))	Pálmi Jóhannesson	
Jordan	JTV	JTV2		
Poland	TP	TP1 (Note: Delayed broadcast on 23 May 1982 at 15:45 (CEST))		
