= Switzerland in the Eurovision Song Contest 1982 =

- Eurovision Song Contest 1982
- Participating broadcaster: Swiss Broadcasting Corporation (SRG SSR)
- Country: Switzerland
- Selection process: Concours Eurovision de la Chanson: Finale Suisse 1982
- Selection date: 28 January 1982

Competing entry
- Song: "Amour on t'aime"
- Artist: Arlette Zola
- Songwriters: Alain Morisod; Pierre Alain

Placement
- Final result: 3rd, 97 points

Participation chronology

Switzerland was represented at the Eurovision Song Contest 1982 with the song "Amour on t'aime", composed by Alain Morisod, with lyrics by Pierre Alain, and performed by Arlette Zola. The Swiss participating broadcaster, the Swiss Broadcasting Corporation (SRG SSR), selected its entry for the contest through a national final.

== Before Eurovision ==
=== Regional selections ===
The Swiss Broadcasting Corporation (SRG SSR) held a national final to select its entry for the Eurovision Song Contest 1982. The national final was a collaboration between three broadcasters that comprised SRG SSR: the Swiss-German and Romansh broadcaster Schweizer Fernsehen der deutschen und rätoromanischen Schweiz (SF DRS), the Swiss-French broadcaster Télévision suisse romande (TSR), and the Swiss-Italian broadcaster Televisione svizzera di lingua italiana (TSI). Starting in 1982, unlike previous Swiss national finals, where all composite broadcasters internally selected their entries, said broadcasters could hold their own regional selection methods.

According to SRG SSR spokesperson Joe Wolf, the Swiss-German and Romansh broadcaster Schweizer Fernsehen der deutschen und rätoromanischen Schweiz (SF DRS) and the Swiss-Italian broadcaster Televisione svizzera di lingua italiana (TSI) selected their songs via public regional finals, whereas the Swiss-French broadcaster Télévision suisse romande (TSR) internally selected its songs. However, it is unknown if a Swiss-Italian selection ultimately occurred, as there are no known mentions of such event in broadcast guides.

==== Swiss-German selection ====
As a result of criticism by the public and industry professionals of selecting the Swiss-German entrants internally, Schweizer Radio DRS (DRS) decided to hold regional public selection rounds for the first time since 1964. DRS also claimed this new selection method would promote new Swiss musicians.

Around 15 to 21 songs were set to be selected by an internal jury, which were chosen based on lyrics and composition. Any songs, which would be sent via cassette tape in whatever quality, were able to be submitted until 16 October 1981. Applicants were also allowed to choose how many performers would be used for their performance. Ultimately, 90 songs were submitted, with the 18 selected songs being revealed in a radio broadcast on 27 October.

The event was held in Zurich, solely broadcast on DRS radio, and hosted by Ueli Beck. The songs were accompanied by Hans Moeckel and the DRS Big Band. The three highest scoring songs in the final advanced to the nationwide Swiss national final and were provided professional backing tracks of their songs.

The 18 songs performed in two semifinals, with nine songs competing in each. Of the 18 entrants, only 15 artists are identified. Among the participants were Rose Brown and Franz Müller, who were also members of the group Rainy Day, which represented Switzerland in 1984.

List of known participants and entries
Artist(s)	Song	Songwriter(s)
Angelique Moore	Unknown	
Ba'rock	"Ba'rock"	André Desponds; Corry Knobel
Daniela Mühleis & Cargo	"Leben"	Unknown (Note: The group's official website claims the song was "self-written," but does not clarify which specific members wrote it.)
Danyla Dalmont	Unknown	
Dave Hard Band	Unknown	
Dorados	Unknown	
Double U	Unknown	
Franz Müller	Unknown	
Ireen Indra	"Kinderlachen"	Peter Horton
Lavendel	Unknown	
Mario Ursprung	Unknown	
Michel Villa & the Matterhorn Company	"Radio Matterhorn"	H. Brändli; R. Schaub; Michel Villa; R. Weber
Rainy Day	"El Dorado"	Peter Reber
Rose Brown	Unknown	
Sono	Unknown	

===== Semifinal 1 =====
The first semifinal was held on 5 December 1981 at 19:30 CET. Throughout the show, the results were decided by the live audience, an "expert" jury, and radio listeners. The four highest scoring songs in each semifinal advanced to the final. The running order, the majority of the songs, and one artist are unknown.

Semifinal 1 — 5 December 1981 (known songs)
Artist(s)	Song	Result
Danyla Dalmont	Unknown	Unknown
Dave Hard Band	Unknown	Unknown
Ireen Indra	"Kinderlachen"	Qualified
Lavendel	Unknown	Unknown
Mario Ursprung	Unknown	Unknown
Michel Villa & the Matterhorn Company	"Radio Matterhorn"	—N/a
Rose Brown	Unknown	Unknown
Sono	Unknown	Unknown

===== Semifinal 2 =====
The second semifinal was held on 12 December 1981 at 19:30 CET. The running order, the majority of the songs, and two artists are unknown.

Semifinal 2 — 12 December 1981 (known songs)
Artist(s)	Song	Result
Angelique Moore	Unknown	Unknown
Ba'rock	"Ba'rock"	Qualified
Daniela Mühleis & Cargo	"Leben"	Qualified
Dorados	Unknown	Unknown
Double U	Unknown	Unknown
Franz Müller	Unknown	Unknown
Rainy Day	"El Dorado"	Qualified

===== Final =====
The regional final was held on 19 December 1981 at 19:30 CET. The running order and four of the remaining qualifiers are unknown.

Final — 19 December 1981 (known songs)
Artist(s)	Song	Result
Ba'rock	"Ba'rock"	Qualified
Daniela Mühleis & Cargo	"Leben"	—N/a
Ireen Indra	"Kinderlachen"	Qualified
Rainy Day	"El Dorado"	Qualified

=== Concours Eurovision de la Chanson: Finale Suisse 1982 ===
SRG SSR received 155 total song submissions (90 in German, 36 in French, and 29 in Italian), and ultimately selected nine to take part in the selection (three per language). Among the participants were Rainy Day, who would later represent Switzerland in 1984. "Amour on t'aime" by Arlette Zola was previously submitted in the 1979 Swiss selection and was set to be sung by Alain Morisod and his group, but was withdrawn due to the group's disbandment. Because the song was not published until the national final, the song was eligible for the contest.

Swiss French broadcaster Télévision suisse romande (TSR) staged the national final on 28 January 1982 at 21:15 CET in Geneva. It was presented by Serge Moisson, and the Groupe Instrumental Romand and Alfredo Smaldini made guest appearances. The national final was broadcast on TV DRS (with German commentary), TSR, and TSI (with Italian commentary).

Participating entries
Broadcaster	Artist(s)	Song	Songwriter(s)		Language
Broadcaster	Artist(s)	Song	Composer(s)	Lyricist(s)	Language
RTSI	Sandro Caroli	"Tu sarai la mia croce"	Massimiliano Pani		Italian
RTSI	Corry & Ray Knobel	"Johnny Saxophon"	Corry Knobel; Ray Knobel		Italian
RTSI	Salvo Ingrassia	"Tu resterai un sogno"	Salvo Ingrassia		Italian
SF DRS	Rainy Day	"El Dorado"	Peter Reber		German
SF DRS	Ireen Indra	"Kinderlachen"	Peter Müller		German
SF DRS	Ba'rock	"Ba'rock"	André Desponds; Corry Knobel		German
TSR	Marc Olivier	"L'enfant de Kairouan"	Marc Olivier; Marino Maillard	Jean-Marie Rolle	French
TSR	Leana	"Moi"	Peter Reber	Robert Rudin	French
TSR	Arlette Zola	"Amour on t'aime"	Alain Morisod	Pierre Alain	French

The voting consisted of regional public votes which were sent to the three divisions of SRG SSR (DRS, TSR, TSI: German, French, and Italian speaking, respectively), a press jury, and a jury of music experts from Bern. Applications for viewers to join the regional juries were sent via postcard until 21 January, and 50 viewers from each canton were randomly selected to cast their votes to their broadcaster divisions via phone call. Additionally, one random voter in the public jury would be drawn to be invited to attend the Eurovision Song Contest as an audience member along with a companion. The selected voter was Daniel Mauser from Geneva. The winner was the song "Amour on t'aime", composed by Alain Morisod with lyrics from Pierre Alain and performed by Arlette Zola.

Final — 28 January 1982
R/O	Artist(s)	Song	Regional Juries			Press Jury	Expert Jury	Total	Place
R/O	Artist(s)	Song	DRS	TSR	TSI	Press Jury	Expert Jury	Total	Place
1	Marc Olivier	"L'enfant de Kairouan"	2	2	2	1	8	15	7
2	Sandro Caroli	"Tu sarai la mia croce"	1	1	3	2	4	11	9
3	Rainy Day	"El Dorado"	8	8	8	7	2	33	3
4	Ireen Indra	"Kinderlachen"	6	4	1	3	1	15	7
5	Ray & Corry Knobel	"Johnny Saxophon"	3	3	5	5	10	26	4
6	Salvo Ingrassia	"Tu resterai un sogno"	6	6	4	6	3	25	6
7	Leana	"Moi"	7	7	6	8	7	35	2
8	Ba'rock	"Ba'rock"	4	5	7	4	6	26	4
9	Arlette Zola	"Amour on t'aime"	10	10	10	10	5	45	1

=== Releases ===
Arlette Zola first recorded and released "Amour on t'aime" in French and German as "Die Welt braucht Liebe" in 1982. In 1998, the song was featured in a CD compilation titled "Concours Eurovision De La Chanson 1956-1998: Schweizer Beiträge", which compiled every Swiss Eurovision entry at the time.

Other finalists in the nationwide selection who also commercially released their songs that year include Rainy Day, Ba'rock, and Ray & Corry Knobel. Leana released "Moi" under her actual name, Eliane Dambre in 2012. The full nationwide selection has been archived by SRG SSR and is able to be watched online.

The only known non-qualifying song in the DRS selection that was commercially released was "Radio Matterhorn" by Michel Villa.

== At Eurovision ==
At the Eurovision Song Contest 1982, held at the Harrogate International Centre in Harrogate, the Swiss entry was the seventh entry of the night following Finland and preceding Cyprus. The Swiss conductor at the contest was Joan Amils. At the close of voting, Switzerland had received 97 points in total; finishing in third place out of eighteen countries, making this the first time Switzerland reached the top 3 since 1963, where they finished second.

The contest was broadcast on SRG SSR via TV DRS (Note: Broadcast through a second audio programme on TSR) (with commentary from Theodor Haller) in German-speaking Switzerland, TSR (with commentary from Georges Hardy) in Romandy, and TSI (with commentary from Giovanni Bertini) in Ticino.

=== Voting ===
Each participating broadcaster assembled a jury panel with at least eleven members. The jurors awarded 1-8, 10, and 12 points to their top ten songs.

Points awarded to Switzerland
Score	Country
12 points	Belgium; United Kingdom
10 points	Austria; Israel; Netherlands; Yugoslavia
8 points	Ireland
7 points	Denmark
6 points	Cyprus
5 points	
4 points	Norway
3 points	
2 points	Luxembourg; Portugal; Sweden; Turkey
1 point	

Points awarded by Switzerland
Score	Country
12 points	Germany
10 points	Israel
8 points	Cyprus
7 points	Spain
6 points	Ireland
5 points	United Kingdom
4 points	Sweden
3 points	Turkey
2 points	Belgium
1 point	Portugal
