= Cyprus in the Eurovision Song Contest 1982 =

- Eurovision Song Contest 1982
- Participating broadcaster: Cyprus Broadcasting Corporation (CyBC)
- Country: Cyprus
- Selection process: Internal selection
- Announcement date: 16 February 1982

Competing entry
- Song: "Mono i agapi"
- Artist: Anna Vissi
- Songwriter: Anna Vissi

Placement
- Final result: 5th, 85 points

Participation chronology

Cyprus was represented at the Eurovision Song Contest 1982 with the song "Mono i agapi", written and performed by Anna Vissi. The Cypriot participating broadcaster, the Cyprus Broadcasting Corporation (CyBC), internally selected its entry for the contest.

== Before Eurovision ==
=== Internal selection ===
Cyprus Broadcasting Corporation (CyBC) opened a submission period for Cypriot artists and composers to submit songs until 23 January 1982. Each artist or composer was only allowed to submit up to two entries each. By the end of the submission period, CyBC had received 29 entries, of which four were invalid. The internal selection took place on 16 February 1982 and the results of the internal selection were decided by a 9-member jury. The competition consisted of multiple stages and in the final stage of the internal selection, five songs remained and "Mono i agapi" by Anna Vissi was declared the winner.

Internal selection final stage - 16 February 1982
Artist	Song	Songwriter(s)	Place
Anna Vissi	"Mono i agapi" (Μόνο η αγάπη)	Anna Vissi	1
Constantina	"Agapi mou, nisi mou" (Αγάπη μου, νησί μου)		2
		Lia Vissi	

== At Eurovision ==
On the night of the final Anna Vissi performed eighth in the running order, following Switzerland and preceding Sweden. At the close of voting Mono i agapi had received 85 points, placing Cyprus in 5th of the 18 participating countries. The Cypriot jury awarded its 12 points to Germany.

The contest was broadcast on RIK, with commentary by Fryni Papadopoulou and John Vickers.

=== Voting ===
Points awarded to Cyprus
Score	Country
12 points	Netherlands; Norway
10 points	
8 points	Finland; Switzerland
7 points	Israel; Spain
6 points	Germany
5 points	Austria; Portugal; Yugoslavia
4 points	Luxembourg
3 points	Belgium; United Kingdom
2 points	
1 point	

Points awarded by Cyprus
Score	Country
12 points	Germany
10 points	Spain
8 points	Belgium
7 points	Austria
6 points	Switzerland
5 points	Ireland
4 points	Norway
3 points	United Kingdom
2 points	Israel
1 point	Yugoslavia

`
