= Spain in the Eurovision Song Contest 1982 =

- Eurovision Song Contest 1982
- Participating broadcaster: Televisión Española (TVE)
- Country: Spain
- Selection process: Internal selection
- Announcement date: Artist: 25 February 1982; Song: 21 March 1982

Competing entry
- Song: "Él"
- Artist: Lucía
- Songwriters: Paco Cepero; Ignacio Román

Placement
- Final result: 10th, 52 points

Participation chronology

Spain was represented at the Eurovision Song Contest 1982 with the song "Él", composed by Paco Cepero, with lyrics by Ignacio Román, and performed by Lucía. The Spanish participating broadcaster, Televisión Española (TVE), internally selected its entry for the contest. The song, performed in position 12, placed tenth out of eighteen competing entries with 52 points.

== Before Eurovision ==
Televisión Española (TVE) internally selected "Él" performed by Lucía as its entry for the Eurovision Song Contest 1982. The song was composed by Paco Cepero, and had lyrics by Ignacio Román. The broadcaster announced the name of the song, the songwriters, and performer on 25 February 1982. The song was presented in the TVE show De ahora en adelante on 21 March.

== At Eurovision ==
On 24 April 1982, the Eurovision Song Contest was held at the Harrogate International Centre in Harrogate hosted by the British Broadcasting Corporation (BBC), and broadcast live throughout the continent. Lucía performed "Él" 12th on the evening, following Belgium and preceding Denmark. Miguel Ángel Varona conducted the event's orchestra performance of the Spanish entry. At the close of voting "Él" had received 52 points, placing 10th in a field of 18.

TVE broadcast the contest in Spain on TVE 1 with commentary by Miguel de los Santos. Before the event, TVE aired a talk show hosted by Marisa Medina introducing the Spanish jury, which continued after the contest commenting on the results.

=== Voting ===
TVE assembled a jury panel with eleven members. The following members comprised the Spanish jury:

- Eusebio Poncela – actor
- Colomán Trabado – runner
- Asunción López – student
- María de los Ángeles Toledano – dancer
- Estela Alcaraz – student
- Miriam Rey – law graduate
- Miguel Martínez – florist
- Marisa Cofiño – impressionist painter
- María Teresa Portal – pub owner
- Luis González – men's hairdresser
- Leandro Martín – jeweler

The jury was chaired by José María Quero, camera director at TVE, with Francisco Hortelano as secretary, and Marisa Medina as spokesperson. These did not have the right to vote, but the president decided in the event of a tie. The jury awarded its maximum of 12 points to Germany.

Points awarded to Spain
Score	Country
12 points	
10 points	Cyprus
8 points	Israel; Turkey
7 points	Germany; Switzerland
6 points	Finland
5 points	
4 points	Belgium
3 points	
2 points	
1 point	Luxembourg; Yugoslavia

Points awarded by Spain
Score	Country
12 points	Germany
10 points	Belgium
8 points	Austria
7 points	Cyprus
6 points	Israel
5 points	Luxembourg
4 points	Sweden
3 points	Ireland
2 points	Norway
1 point	United Kingdom
