= United Kingdom in the Eurovision Song Contest 1982 =

- Eurovision Song Contest 1982
- Participating broadcaster: British Broadcasting Corporation (BBC)
- Country: United Kingdom
- Selection process: A Song for Europe 1982
- Selection date: 24 March 1982

Competing entry
- Song: "One Step Further"
- Artist: Bardo
- Songwriter: Simon Jefferis

Placement
- Final result: 7th, 76 points

Participation chronology

The United Kingdom was represented at the Eurovision Song Contest 1982 with the song "One Step Further", written by Simon Jefferis, and performed by the band Bardo. The British participating broadcaster, the British Broadcasting Corporation (BBC), selected its entry through a national final. In addition, the BBC was also the host broadcaster and staged the event at the Harrogate International Centre in Harrogate, after winning the previous edition with the song "Making Your Mind Up" by Bucks Fizz.

== Before Eurovision ==
=== A Song for Europe 1982 ===
The British Broadcasting Corporation (BBC) used once again the television show A Song for Europe to select its entry, as it had since its debut at the contest in 1957. Terry Wogan once again hosted the contest, which was held on 24 March at Studio 1 of the BBC Television Centre in London. Eight songs were shortlisted from those submitted to the Music Publishers Association. Bucks Fizz were guests at the show, singing their current single "My Camera Never Lies" in a pre-recorded performance. The group were interviewed by Terry Wogan live during the show and group member Bobby G performed backing vocals for the winning artists, Bardo. The BBC Concert Orchestra under the direction of Ronnie Hazlehurst as conductor accompanied all the songs, but despite performing live, the orchestra were off-screen, behind the set.

The regional juries voted internally and awarded 15 points to their favourite song, 12 points to the second, 10 points to the third and then 9, 8, 7, 6 and 5 points in order of preference for the songs from 4th to 8th. The juries were based in Glasgow, Birmingham, Bristol, Belfast, London, Manchester and Cardiff.

Bardo's victory meant that Sally-Ann Triplett became only the third singer to win the Song for Europe contest twice, having already won the 1980 contest as part of Prima Donna. (Cliff Richard had represented the UK twice in Eurovision, but did not participate in a contest to determine the British artist). Triplett remains the only artist to have participated multiple times to win the contest at all attempts.

A Song for Europe 1982 – 24 March 1982
R/O	Artist	Song	Songwriter(s)	Points	Place
1	Q-Feel	"Dancing in Heaven (Orbital Be-Bop)"	Brian Fairweather; Martin Page	59	6
2	Paul Curtis	"No Matter How I Try"	Paul Curtis	60	4
3	The Touring Company	"Every Step of the Way"	David Mindel	69	2
4	Lovin' Feeling	"Different Worlds and Different People"	Tony Hiller; Paul Curtis	60	4
5	Good Looks	"Every Day of My Life"	Patrick Burston; David Mindel	69	2
6	Rich Gypsy	"You're the Only Good Thing in My Life"	Elaine Saffer; John Carrington	53	8
7	Bardo	"One Step Further"	Simon Jefferis	76	1
8	The Weltons	"How Long"	Paul Curtis; Graham Sacher	58	7

Detailed Jury Votes
R/O	Song	Glasgow	Birmingham	Bristol	Belfast	London	Manchester	Cardiff	Total
1	"Dancing in Heaven (Orbital Be-Bop)"	15	8	8	7	10	5	6	59
2	"No Matter How I Try"	12	6	6	15	5	9	7	60
3	"Every Step of the Way"	6	15	15	6	12	6	9	69
4	"Different Worlds and Different People"	7	9	7	8	7	7	15	60
5	"Every Day of My Life"	8	10	10	12	9	12	8	69
6	"You're the Only Good Thing in My Life"	5	7	5	10	6	15	5	53
7	"One Step Further"	10	12	12	9	15	8	10	76
8	"How Long"	9	5	9	5	8	10	12	58
Jury Spokespersons
Glasgow – Ken Bruce; Birmingham – David Freeman; Bristol – Andy Batten-Foster; Belfast – David Olver; London – Ray Moore; Manchester – John Mundy; Cardiff – Iwan Thomas

== At Eurovision ==
The BBC hosted the Eurovision Song Contest 1982 in Harrogate, presented by Jan Leeming. The British entry, "One Step Further" by Bardo, gained 76 points and was positioned seventh overall. The winner of the contest was Germany with "Ein bißchen Frieden" by Nicole.

The contest was seen by 14.45 million viewers.

=== Voting ===
Points awarded to the United Kingdom
Score	Country
12 points	Austria; Luxembourg
10 points	Turkey
8 points	
7 points	Ireland
6 points	Norway; Yugoslavia
5 points	Switzerland
4 points	Finland; Portugal
3 points	Cyprus
2 points	Denmark; Israel
1 point	Germany; Netherlands; Spain

Points awarded by the United Kingdom
Score	Country
12 points	Switzerland
10 points	Austria
8 points	Germany
7 points	Ireland
6 points	Luxembourg
5 points	Sweden
4 points	Portugal
3 points	Cyprus
2 points	Belgium
1 point	Israel
