= Yugoslavia in the Eurovision Song Contest 1982 =

- Eurovision Song Contest 1982
- Participating broadcaster: Jugoslavenska radiotelevizija (JRT)
- Country: Yugoslavia
- Selection process: Jugovizija 1982
- Selection date: 12 March 1982

Competing entry
- Song: "Halo, halo"
- Artist: Aska
- Songwriters: Aleksandar Ilić; Miro Zec

Placement
- Final result: 14th, 21 points

Participation chronology

Yugoslavia was represented at the Eurovision Song Contest 1982 with the song "Halo, halo", composed by Aleksandar Ilić, with lyrics by Miro Zec, and performed by the group Aska. The Yugoslavian participating broadcaster, Jugoslavenska radiotelevizija (JRT), selected its entry through Jugovizija 1982.

== Before Eurovision ==
=== Jugovizija 1982 ===
RTV Ljubljana staged Jugovizija 1982 on 12 March at its television studios in Ljubljana, hosted by Miša Molk. Each of the eight Jugoslavenska radiotelevizija (JRT) participating sub-national broadcasters (RTV Sarajevo, RTV Skopje, RTV Novi Sad, RTV Titograd, RTV Zagreb, RTV Belgrade, RTV Ljubljana, and RTV Pristina) entered two songs to Jugovizija, making a national final of sixteen songs. The winner was decided by the votes of the regional juries of the eight broadcasters, which could not vote for their own entries.

The winner was "Halo, halo" representing RTV Belgrade, written by Aleksandar Ilić and Miro Zec, and performed by Aska.

R/O	Broadcaster	Artist	Song	Points	Place
1	(Socialist Republic of Croatia) RTV Zagreb	Novi fosili	"Vikend tata, vikend mama"	53	4
2	(Socialist Republic of Croatia) RTV Zagreb	Srebrna krila	"Julija i Romeo"	53	4
3	(Socialist Republic of Montenegro) RTV Titograd	Makadam	"Balerina"	34	7
4	(Socialist Republic of Bosnia and Herzegovina) RTV Sarajevo	Seid Memić Vajta	"Ne zaboravi me"	54	3
5	(Socialist Republic of Serbia) RTV Pristina	Gazmend Pallaska	"Kujtimi për ty"	1	16
6	(Socialist Republic of Macedonia) RTV Skopje	Marjana and Rosana Savić	"Molci, molci"	11	12
7	(Socialist Republic of Serbia) RTV Belgrade	Aska	"Halo, halo"	60	1
8	(Socialist Republic of Bosnia and Herzegovina) RTV Sarajevo	Indexi	"To se traži"	24	9
9	(Socialist Republic of Montenegro) RTV Titograd	Srđan Marjanović	"Poljubi me"	15	11
10	(Socialist Republic of Slovenia) RTV Ljubljana	Oliver Antauer	"Irena"	9	13
11	(Socialist Republic of Serbia) RTV Pristina	Bedri Islami	"Bregu ëndërtar"	2	15
12	(Socialist Republic of Slovenia) RTV Ljubljana	Hazard	"Bistro"	20	10
13	(Socialist Republic of Serbia) RTV Novi Sad	Bata Nonin	"Ja te razumem"	3	14
14	(Socialist Republic of Serbia) RTV Belgrade	Kim	"Sve i svašta"	32	8
15	(Socialist Republic of Macedonia) RTV Skopje	Maja Odžaklievska	"Julija"	57	2
16	(Socialist Republic of Serbia) RTV Novi Sad	Sunčeve pege	"Noć je stvorena za ples"	36	6

== At Eurovision ==
The contest was broadcast on TV Beograd 1, TV Zagreb 1, and TV Novi Sad, all with commentary by Oliver Mlakar, as well as TV Ljubljana 1, and TV Koper-Capodistria.

On the night of the contest Yugoslavia performed 14th, following Denmark and preceding Israel. At the close of voting it had received 21 points, placing 14th out of 18 countries. The Yugoslav jury awarded its 12 points to contest winners Germany.

=== Voting ===
Points awarded to Yugoslavia
Score	Country
12 points	Sweden
10 points	
8 points	
7 points	
6 points	
5 points	
4 points	Turkey
3 points	Denmark
2 points	
1 point	Belgium; Cyprus

Points awarded by Yugoslavia
Score	Country
12 points	Germany
10 points	Switzerland
8 points	Ireland
7 points	Belgium
6 points	United Kingdom
5 points	Cyprus
4 points	Austria
3 points	Israel
2 points	Sweden
1 point	Spain
