= Denmark in the Eurovision Song Contest 1982 =

- Eurovision Song Contest 1982
- Participating broadcaster: Danmarks Radio (DR)
- Country: Denmark
- Selection process: Dansk Melodi Grand Prix 1982
- Selection date: 13 March 1982

Competing entry
- Song: "Video Video"
- Artist: Brixx
- Songwriter: Jens Brixtofte

Placement
- Final result: 17th, 5 points

Participation chronology

Denmark was represented at the Eurovision Song Contest 1982 with the song "Video Video", written by Jens Brixtofte, and performed by the group Brixx. The Danish participating broadcaster, Danmarks Radio (DR), organised the Dansk Melodi Grand Prix 1982 in order to select its entry for the contest. The previous year's Danish entrant Tommy Seebach failed in his bid to represent Denmark for a third time.

== Before Eurovision ==
=== Melodi Grand Prix 1982 ===
Danmarks Radio (DR) held its national final titled Melodi Grand Prix 1982 on 13 March at TV-Byen in Gladsaxe, hosted by Jørgen de Mylius. 12 songs took part with the winner being decided by voting from five regional juries.

Final – 13 March 1982
R/O	Artist	Song	Points	Place
1	Brixx	"Video Video"	55	1
2	Tommy Seebach Band	"Hip hurra - det' min fødselsda'"	47	2
3	Lise Dandanell and Jacob Groth Band	"På træk"	16	9
4	Fenders	"Det' løgn"	37	4
5	Carsten Elmer and Jørgen Klubien	"Marie"	21	7
6	Käte and Per	"I denne verden"	21	7
7	Jannie Høeg	"Elske"	22	6
8	Taxie	"Drømmene er forbi"	7	10
9	Anne Karin	"Når man kun er atten år"	46	3
10	Peter Belli	"Spejldans"	23	5

== At Eurovision ==
On the night of the final Brixx performed 13th in the running order, following Spain and preceding Yugoslavia. At the close of voting "Video Video" had received only 5 points, placing Denmark 17th of the 18 entries, ahead only of the nul-points entry from Finland. The Danish jury awarded its 12 points to contest winners Germany.

The contest was broadcast on DR TV, with commentary by Jørgen de Mylius.

=== Voting ===
Points awarded to Denmark
Score	Country
12 points	
10 points	
8 points	
7 points	
6 points	
5 points	
4 points	
3 points	Portugal
2 points	
1 point	Ireland; Sweden

Points awarded by Denmark
Score	Country
12 points	Germany
10 points	Belgium
8 points	Sweden
7 points	Switzerland
6 points	Austria
5 points	Ireland
4 points	Luxembourg
3 points	Yugoslavia
2 points	United Kingdom
1 point	Israel
