= Michael Scheickl =

Austrian singer

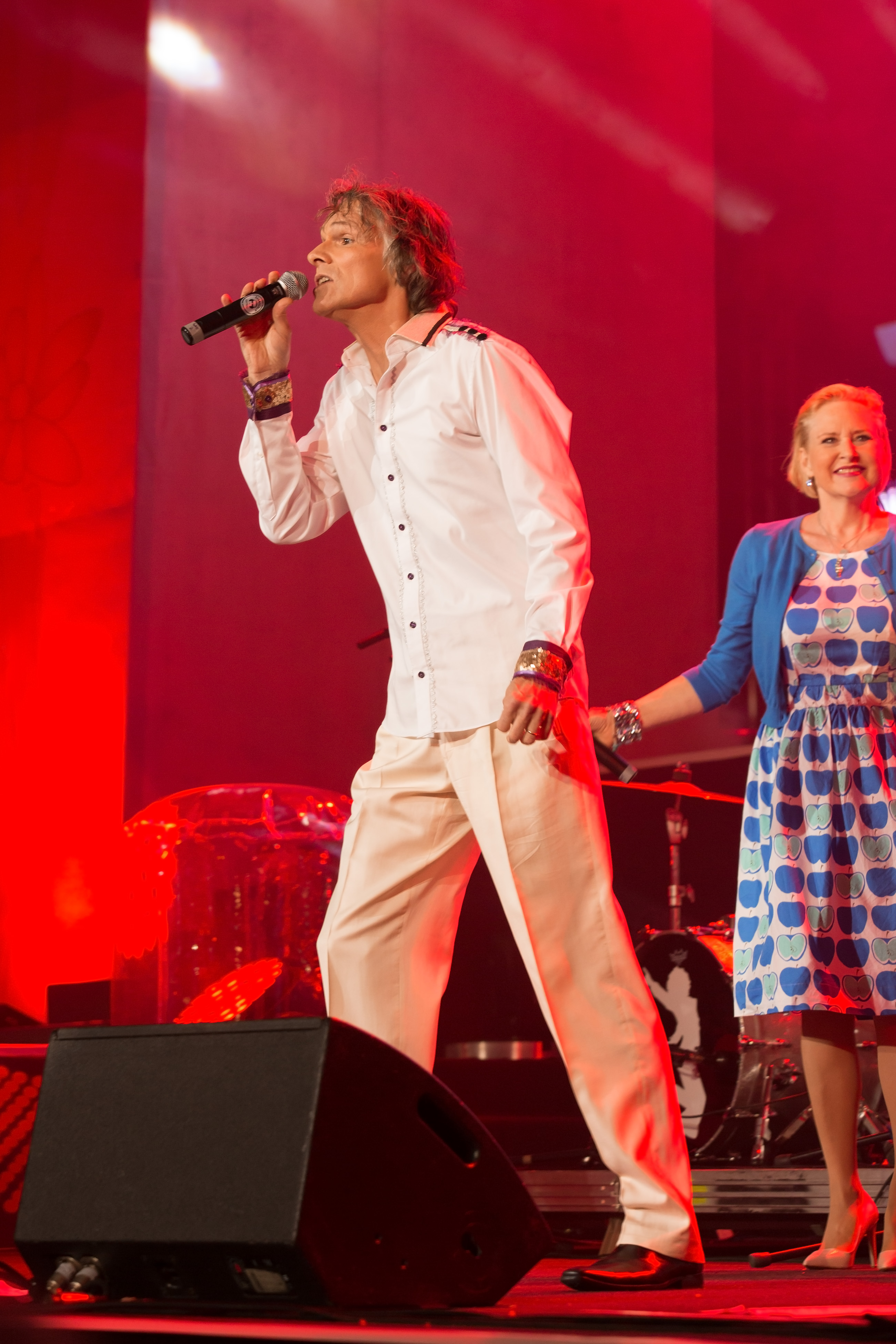
Scheickl performing in 2015

Michael Scheickl (born 23 March 1957) is an Austrian singer, songwriter and record producer.

In 1981, he recorded a solo album under the pseudonym Fritz. He was one half of the duo Mess, who represented Austria at the Eurovision Song Contest in 1982 with the song "Sonntag". Scheickl placed 9th with 57 points. He composed and produced many tracks as part of the Austrian trio Joy, and sang backing vocals on the album Enjoy.

Preceded by Marty Brem	Austria in the Eurovision Song Contest; 1982	Succeeded by Westend
