= Alain Morisod =

Swiss musician and television producer (born 1949)

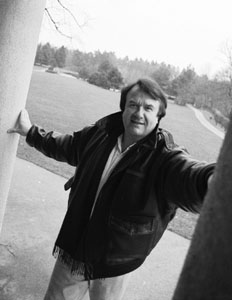
- Morisod in 1996, by Erling Mandelmann

Background information
- Also known as: Alain Patrick; Alain More
- Born: Alain Morisod; 23 June 1949 (age 77); Geneva, Switzerland
- Occupations: Musician; composer; record producer; conductor; television producer
- Instrument: Piano
- Years active: 1967–present
- Labels: Carabine; Evasion Disques; Barclay; One Way; Sunset; Stamy; Kosmos; Force; Polydor; Dep; Transistor; Les Productions Guy Cloutier; Shangali; Bibus
- Website: www.morisod.com

Alain Morisod (born 23 June 1949) is a Swiss musician and television producer, known for forming Sweet People who had a UK number 4 hit in 1980 with "Et Les Oiseaux Chantaient (And the Birds Were Singing)".

== Early life ==
Morisod grew up with an older brother, Maurice, born 3 April 1946. He also had another brother, Jean-Claude, born 23 October 1947, but he died only 4 days after being born. At the age of 9, Morisod lost his father, Jean, who was a butcher in the Geneva district, Saint-Gervais. Following the encouragement of his mother, Maguerite, he then learned to play the piano. He studied at the Institut Florimont between 1958 and 1968 and then went on to study in the Faculty of Law at the University of Geneva, from 1968 to 1970. He then went on to study at the Conservatoire de Musique and the Conservatoire Populaire, both in Geneva.

== Music career ==
From 1967, Morisod was a piano accompanist for artists such as Arlette Zola, Henri Dès and Fernand Raynaud. His first single, "Concerto pour un été", was released in Switzerland on 27 April 1971, which Morisod also composed and produced. Then, soon after, producer Henri Belolo called Morisod saying that he wanted to release the song in France. The only problem was that the name Morisod sounded too 'Swiss', so Belolo proposed replacing it with Alain Patrick, which Morisod accepted. The single was then released in France in June. The song was a hit, selling over 2 million copies, becoming a Top 40 hit in France and also reaching number 46 in Wallonia. The following year, it once again reached the Top 40 in France. However, the song became a bigger hit in 1973 in Brazil where it was number 1 for 9 weeks. The album of the same name also reached at least number 10 in France. A remix of song, with seagull cries and the noise of waves, was also released at the request of radio station RTL, as it sounded more 'new age'.

In 1977, Morisod formed Sweet People to participate in the 1978 Eurovision Song Contest. Their song "Hey, le musicien" came second in the national finals, losing out to "Vivre" by Carole Vinci, which Morisod had also composed. In February 1978, "Le Lac de Côme" was released and was a number 1 in Canada and the album of the same name was certified platinum. The song had originally been released as the B-side to "Crystal Tears" the previous year, but to his astonishment, Morisod got a call from Quebecois producer Gerry Plamondon, to say that the song could work in Canada and so it was then released there.

After its success, Morisod's brother, Maurice, came up with the idea of removing the piano part from the song and adding in birdsong. This became "Et Les Oiseaux Chantaient", which was quickly included on their album Percé. The song was released in the UK in 1980 with the parenthesised "And the Birds Were Singing", where it peaked at number 4 in the charts. It was also a Top Ten hit in Flanders and the Netherlands and a Top 40 hit in Germany. The song charted again in the UK in 1987, reaching number 73. Sweet People achieved further success with "Adieu et Bonne Chance", which reached number 25 in France in 1985.

For the 1982 Eurovision Song Contest, Morisod composed the Swiss entry "Amour on t'aime", sung by Arlette Zola, and also provided backing vocals as part of Sweet People.

Morisod has lived in Canada since around 1980 and over the years has achieved great success there with Sweet People; numerous albums have been certified platinum and gold by the CRIA, including Le petit garcon au piano, Nos plus belles melodies, Noël sans toi, Prend le temps and Madawaska in the 1980s and many more in the 1990s.

== Other work ==
In 1979, he took over the Casino-Théâtre Revue in Geneva and managed to revive its success. He had previously accompanied Ferdinand Raynaud on piano there in 1971. The Casino-Théâtre was then closed in 1987 due to renovation work and once reopened in 1990, management was entrusted to Pierre Naftule.

From 1980 to 1985, Morisod was a producer on the television network Télévision Suisse Romande where Christian Morin presented and from 1998 to 2019, he had his own variety show Les coups de cœur d'Alain Morisod, alongside presenters Jean-Marc Richard and Lolita Morena.

From 1986 to 1991, he was the president of the football club Urania Genève Sport, and managed in 2 years to be promoted from the 2. Liga to the Nationalliga B.

After being engaged for 31 years, Morisod married fellow Sweet People singer Mady Rudaz in 2001.

For the 2003, 2004 and 2006 Eurovision Song Contests, Morisod was the co-commentator with Jean-Marc Richard for the French-language Swiss television station RTS.

In 2011, he was the ambassador for the 24th telethon in Switzerland (Téléthon Action Suisse) for French-speaking Switzerland, alongside journalist Malick Touré-Reinhard.

== Discography ==
=== Albums ===
==== Studio albums ====
As Alain Patrick / Alain Morisod and His Orchestra

- Concerto pour un été (1971)
- Nocturne pour un amour (1973)
- Adagio Romantique (1973)
- Concerto d'amour / Nabucco (1974)
- Alain Patrick (1976)
- Les plus beaux noëls de notre enfance (1976)
- Hommage à... (1977)
- Mélodie pour deux trompettes (1977)
- Fetes des Vignerons "mélodies eternelles" (1977)
- Mélodies pour rèver (1978)
- Par un matin d'amour (1980)

As Alan More and His Orchestra

- Vol. 2 (1974)

As Alain Morisod

- Il était une fois... (1980)
- Les plus belles mélodies de Romandie (1984)
- Sur mon piano (1996) – QUE #17
- Mélodies pour toujours (1997) – QUE #13, CAN #99
- Swiss People (1998) – QUE #36
- Les plus belles musiques de films (2002) – QUE #6
- Pianissimo (2007) – QUE #39

With Sweet People

- Lake Como (Le lac de Côme) (1977) – QUE #1
- Percé (1979) – QUE #1
- Belinda... Belle de nuit (1980) – QUE #1
- Sweet People (1980)
- Le p'tit garcon au piano (1980) – QUE #1
- C'était une belle journée (1981) – QUE #5
- A Wonderful Day (1981)
- Libertad au revoir (1982) – QUE #1
- Je t'attendrai my love (1983) – QUE #1
- Swiss concerto (1983)
- Noël sans toi (1983) – QUE #1
- Daydream (1983)
- Une chanson italienne (1984) – QUE #1
- Prends le Temps (1984) – QUE #1
- Voilà pourquoi on chante des chansons / Vivre (1985) – QUE #5
- Et j'ai le mal de toi (1986) – QUE #5
- Madawaska (1987) – QUE #5
- Photographies (1988) – QUE #7
- Les violons d'Acadie (1989) – QUE #3
- C'est Noël (1989) – QUE #39
- Silver bird / Un jour, on se reverra (1991) – QUE #1
- Couleur mélancolie (1992) – QUE #7
- Toujours là! (1993) – QUE #3
- ...Natures (1995) – QUE #9
- Ecoute encore (1999) – QUE #12
- L'amour ne meurt jamais (2000) – QUE #8
- Un vrai Noël / Le Noël des oiseaux (2001) – QUE #14
- Passionnément... (2002) – QUE #11
- Comme si demain n'existait pas (2003) – QUE #36
- Pour tous ceux qui vont s'aimer (2004) – QUE #16
- Coleur country (2005) – QUE #22
- À chacun son étoile (2007) – QUE #25
- On chante toujours pour quelqu'un (2009)
- Buona sera (2009) – QUE #11, SWI #89
- Marin (2009) – QUE #22
- Jour de chance (2010) – SWI #78
- Super sympa (2011)
- Quand on s'aime (2012)
- Fiesta! (2012) – QUE #28
- Si c'était à refaire... (2012) – QUE #36
- La dernière séance (2014) – CAN #20, SWI #90
- Qu'est-ce qu'on a dansé sur cette chanson... (2015) – SWI #91
- La route m'a donné rendez-vous (2017) – CAN #40
- Noël (2017) – CAN #57
- Ainsi soit-il (2019) – CAN #43

==== Compilation albums ====
As Alain Morisod and His Orchestra

- Mes plus grands succès (1979)

With Sweet People

- Summer Dream (1981)
- Nos plus belles melodies (1982) – QUE #3
- 10 ans de succès (1983)
- 15 grands succès – Mélodies instrumentales (1985) – QUE #13
- 10 grand succès – Mélodies chantées (1985) – QUE #9
- Dix ans de succès – Volume 1 (1987) – QUE #1
- Dix ans de succès – Volume 2 (1987) – QUE #1
- 20 mélodies pour rêver (1991) – QUE #7
- 20 titres or (1992) – QUE #7
- 20 mélodies pour rêver – Volume 2 (1993) – QUE #11
- 20 titres or – Volume 2 (1992) – QUE #9
- Les grandes chansons / Le sentier de neige (1996) – QUE #3, CAN #17
- 20 ans déjà (1997) – QUE #5
- Les plus grands succès du bel âge (2000) – QUE #14
- La légende (2000) – QUE #22
- La compil' (2005) – QUE #13
- Anthologie – 30 ans de succès (2008) – QUE #17
- 40 ans – 40 succès (2010)
- Vos chansons d'or (2013) – QUE #64

=== Charting singles ===
Year	Single	Peak chart positions							
Year	Single	BE (FLA)	BE (WA)	BRA	FRA	GER	QUE	NL	UK
1971	"Concerto pour un été"	–	46	1	–	–	–	–	–
1978	"Le Lac de Côme"	–	–	–	–	–	1	–	–
1978	"Élodie"	–	–	–	–	–	12	–	–
1979	"Et les oiseaux chantaient" (released in Europe in 1980)	5	–	–	–	26	9	4	4
1979	"Percé"	–	–	–	–	–	3	–	–
1979	"Barcarolle"	–	–	–	–	–	36	–	–
1980	"Belinda"	–	–	–	–	–	18	–	–
1980	"Crépuscule"	–	–	–	–	–	19	–	–
1980	"Le petit garçon au piano"	–	–	–	–	–	7	–	–
1981	"La plage abandonnée"	–	–	–	–	–	21	–	–
1981	"Neige (81)"	–	–	–	–	–	8	–	–
1982	"Au revoir"	–	–	–	–	–	2	–	–
1982	"Libertad"	–	–	–	–	–	46	–	–
1983	"Je t'attendrai my love"	–	–	–	–	–	1	–	–
1983	"Noël sans toi"	–	–	–	–	–	8	–	–
1984	"Une chanson italienne"	–	–	–	–	–	2	–	–
1984	"La belle vie"	–	–	–	–	–	14	–	–
1984	"Adieu et bonne chance"	–	–	–	25	–	3	–	–
1985	"Prends le temps"	–	–	–	–	–	3	–	–
1985	"Hasta mañana mon amour"	–	–	–	–	–	10	–	–
1985	"Voilà pourquoi on chante des chansons"	–	–	–	–	–	34	–	–
1985	"Tant qu'il nous restera des chansons"	–	–	–	–	–	10	–	–
1986	"L'arbre et l'enfant"	–	–	–	–	–	10	–	–
1986	"River blue"	–	–	–	–	–	8	–	–
1986	"Et j'ai le mal de toi"	–	–	–	–	–	20	–	–
1987	"Et les oiseaux chantaient" (re-release)	–	–	–	–	–	–	–	73
1987	"Ce n'est qu'un rêve"	–	–	–	–	–	4	–	–
1988	"Je pense à toi"	–	–	–	–	–	5	–	–
1988	"À demain nous deux"	–	–	–	–	–	25	–	–
1989	"Les violons d'Acadie"	–	–	–	–	–	27	–	–
1991	"Un jour on se reverra"	–	–	–	–	–	37	–	–
1991	"Salut Jo"	–	–	–	–	–	41	–	–
1993	"Couleur mélancolie"	–	–	–	–	–	36	–	–
1994	"Toujours là"	–	–	–	–	–	47	–	–
1996	"Amoureux"	–	–	–	–	–	46	–	–
"—" denotes releases that did not chart or were not released in that territory.
