= Doce =

Portuguese female band

- Doce logo.

Background information
- Origin: Lisbon, Portugal
- Genres: Pop; dance-pop
- Years active: 1979–1987
- Label: Polydor
- Past members: Lena Coelho; Laura Diogo; Teresa Miguel; Fátima Padinha; Ágata (Fernanda de Sousa)

Doce was a Portuguese pop all-female band founded in 1979, one of the first of its type in Portugal and in Europe. Its name is the Portuguese word for "sweet" and its core lineup consisted of Lena Coelho, Laura Diogo, Teresa Miguel and Fátima Padinha. The band was assembled by Tozé Brito, a Portuguese composer and mentor, who envisioned a group focusing on female sensuality, both visually and in its musicality. The group came to an official end in 1987, following Fátima Padinha's leave in 1986. The Portuguese singer Ágata (Fernanda de Sousa) replaced those band members during this final period.

The group participated in the Eurovision Song Contest 1982, where it placed 13th. It also entered Festival da Canção four times, winning once in 1982 and earning 2nd, 4th and 11th place in 1980, 1981 and 1984, respectively. In 2021, director Patrícia Sequeira released two projects about Doce: a seven-part series titled Doce and a film titled Bem Bom.

== Origins ==
Doce emerged in 1979, during a transformative period in Portuguese society, still grappling with the dualities of conservatism and progressivism in the aftermath of the Carnation Revolution. The group envisioned and assembled by Tozé Brito, a seasoned musician and producer, who worked as Artists and repertoire (A&R) for PolyGram. Alongside Mike Sargeant, a Scottish musician long based in Portugal, Brito conceived the idea of forming an all-female pop group. Brito explained the group's concept in his biography, Eu Sou Outro Tu: Doce was designed to "capitalize on their visual appeal," blending sensuality with innovative song structures. The group's clothing was primarily sensual and several of the band's outfits were designed by the Portuguese stylist José Carlos.

The band was Portugal's second all-female pop band and the first to achieve mainstream success. They were preceded by Cocktail, a band also assembled by Brito. Of the core line up, Lena Coelho, Teresa Miguel and Fátima Padinha had prior experience as singer and had collaborated with Brito. Coelho sang for Cocktail, while Miguel and Padinha were a part of Gemini. Laura Diogo was the only band member new to the industry. Instead, she had previously worked as a model and had participated in the Miss Portugal pageant.

== Career ==
=== Rise to fame and controversies ===
Their debut single, Amanhã de Manhã, written by Tozé Brito and Mike Sargeant, quickly became a sensation in 1980. The song captivated audiences with its bold, romantic undertones and modern sound, marking a departure from the traditional fado and nacional-cançonetismo styles that had long dominated Portuguese music.

Since its founding, the group was envisioned to win Festival da Canção, the Portuguese qualifier for the Eurovision Song Contest. The group made a significant impact during their performance at the 1980 Festival da Canção, where they presented the song "Doce", placing second. The event, the first to be broadcast in color by RTP, highlighted their vibrant, sequined dresses, cheerful choreography, and striking hairstyles. Soon after, they released their debut album Ok, Ko which has the group posing in a boxing ring on its cover.

In 1981, the group competed again with the song "Ali Babá", dressed as odalisques, placing fourth. This performance drew criticism from feminist writer Maria Teresa Horta, who controversially described performance as pornographic. In late 1981, the group became again the target of controversy, when a malicious rumor engulfed vocalist Laura Diogo. While on tour, the Doce member became the center of a fabricated scandal alleging she had been hospitalized after a sexual encounter with the football player Reinaldo Gomes. The baseless story, propagated by two doctors, spread rapidly, bolstered by societal prejudices and sensationalist reporting. Despite efforts to refute the claims, including legal action and hospital records proving her absence from the alleged scene, the rumor persisted. The ordeal not only disrupted Diogo's personal life, ending her relationship at the time, but also exemplified the challenges faced by women in the public eye, particularly those who defied traditional norms in conservative 1980s Portugal.

Despite these controversies, Doce continued to win over audiences with their daring music and performances, even as they faced logistical challenges on tour, such as makeshift backstage accommodations and opposition from conservative local authorities.

=== Eurovision and international career ===
In 1982, the group won the Festival da Canção with "Bem bom" ("Very good") and went on the Eurovision Song Contest 1982 to reach the 13th position. The group performed dressed up in black and white as musketeers covered head to toe. This opened up international opportunities for the band, including the release of an English version of this song, called "Bim Bom", as well as a Spanish version, called "Bingo".

The group was featured in international press from the Philippines to the United States and they followed up their Eurovision hit with the songs "For The Love Of Conchita" and "Choose Again" in 1982 and "Starlight" and "Stepping Stone" in 1983.

In 1984, Doce competed for the last time in Festival da Canção, with "Barquinho da Esperança", a song written by Miguel Esteves Cardoso and Pedro Ayres Magalhães. However, this time the group placed only 11th.

=== Final years and breakup ===
The pressures of fame took a toll on Doce, despite their success and public adoration. The relentless demands of performing and touring left little room for personal lives, as time with family was often sacrificed. This intense lifestyle created cracks within the group, exacerbated by stress and exhaustion. Lena Coelho later revealed that she had undergone three abortions during her time with the band, while Teresa Miguel disclosed having one. In 1985, Coelho became pregnant again and took a temporary leave, during which she was replaced by Ágata (Fernanda de Sousa) from May to October. In 1986, Fátima Padinha permanently left the group, as she has been promised a solo career, and Ágata officially joined, though Tozé Brito noted a shift in the band's dynamic.

Brito recalled receiving a phone call at 4 a.m. from the band while they were at the café Corcel in Porto, informing him of their decision to dissolve. Although Brito managed to find a temporary resolution, the group ultimately disbanded in 1987. That same year, Doce released a final, double album featuring their most iconic songs, serving as a farewell to their fans. Reflecting on their legacy, Tozé Brito remarked that while the group concluded its journey, it did so with dignity, preserving the memory of Doce.

== Legacy ==
In the 2000s, Lena Coelho produced a children musical project called Docemania, which covered some songs from Doce.

In 2021, director Patrícia Sequeira released two projects about Doce: a seven-part series titled Doce and a film titled Bem Bom. Doce first screened at Series Mania, a European television series festival, and Bem Bom released in domestic theaters.

== Discography ==
=== Albums ===
- OK KO (LP, Polygram, 1980)
- É Demais (LP, Polygram, 1981)

=== Singles ===
- "Amanhã de Manhã/Depois de Ti" (Single, Polygram, 1980)
- "Doce/Um Beijo Só" (Single, Polygram, 1980)
- "OK KO/Doce Caseiro" (Single, Polygram, 1980)
- "Ali-Bábá (Um Homem das Arábias)/Jingle Tónico" (Single, Polygram, 1981)
- "É Demais/Dói-dói" (Single, Polygram, 1981)
- "Bem Bom/Perfumada" (Single, Polygram, 1982)
- "For The Love Of Conchita/Choose Again" (Single, Polygram, 1983)
- "Starlight/Stepping Stone" (Single, Polygram, 1983)
- "Quente, Quente, Quente/Eu e o meu namorado" (Single, Polygram, 1984)
- "O Barquinho da Esperança/A história do barquinho" (Single, Polygram, 1984)
- “Bem Bom“ (CD, Universal Music Portugal, 2003)

=== The Compilations ===
- Doce 1979-1987 (Compilation, Polygram, 1986)
- 15 anos Depois (Compilation, Universal, 2002), CD
- Docemania (Compilation, Universal, 2003), CD/Comp
- A Arte E A Música (Compilation, Universal Music Portugal, 2004) CD/Comp
- Bandas Míticas || Volume 24 (Compilation, Levoir, 2011) CD/Comp
- Os Maiores Êxitos Das Doce (Compilation, Lisbon Records, N.D) LP/Album/Comp

Awards and achievements
Preceded by Carlos Paião with "Playback"	Portugal in the Eurovision Song Contest; 1982	Succeeded by Armando Gama with "Esta balada que te dou"
