= Germany in the Eurovision Song Contest 1982 =

- Eurovision Song Contest 1982
- Participating broadcaster: ARD (Note: Arbeitsgemeinschaft der öffentlich-rechtlichen Rundfunkanstalten der Bundesrepublik Deutschland) – Bayerischer Rundfunk (BR)
- Country: Germany
- Selection process: Ein Lied für Harrogate
- Selection date: 20 March 1982

Competing entry
- Song: "Ein bißchen Frieden"
- Artist: Nicole
- Songwriters: Ralph Siegel; Bernd Meinunger

Placement
- Final result: 1st, 161 points

Participation chronology

Germany was represented at the Eurovision Song Contest 1982 with the song "Ein bißchen Frieden", composed by Ralph Siegel, with lyrics by Bernd Meinunger, and performed by Nicole. The German participating broadcaster on behalf of ARD, Bayerischer Rundfunk (BR), selected their entry through a national final. The entry eventually won the Eurovision Song Contest.

== Before Eurovision ==
807 songs were submitted for the German selection. A jury composed of 13 members chose 24 of them which then were presented on ARD's radio stations. A jury of 500 members then chose twelve entries for the national final.

=== Ein Lied für Harrogate ===
Bayerischer Rundfunk (BR) held the German national final, Ein Lied für Harrogate, on 20 March at its Studio 4 in Unterföhring, hosted by Carolin Reiber and Rudolf Rohlinger. The final was broadcast on Deutsches Fernsehen and on radio station NDR 2.

Twelve songs made it to the national final, which was broadcast by BR to ARD broadcasters across West Germany. The winner was decided by a sampling of 507 viewers who were meant to symbolize a fair representation of the country's population. Each person gave every song a vote, from 1 (for worst) to 12 (for best). Therefore, the theoretical "worst score" a song could receive would be 500, and the "best score" would be 6000. Three of the competitors previously represented other countries: French singer Séverine won the 1971 contest for Monaco, Paola previously represented her native Switzerland at two different contests (1969 and 1980), and Jürgen Marcus previously represented Luxembourg at the 1976 contest. Additionally, Mary Roos had represented Germany in 1972, and would return as the German representative two years later.

The winning entry was "Ein bißchen Frieden," performed by Nicole and composed by Ralph Siegel with lyrics by Bernd Meinunger.

Ein Lied für Harrogate – 20 March 1982
R/O	Artist	Song	Songwriters	Votes	Place
1	Gottlieb Wendehals	"Der Ohrwurm"	Harald Wolff Berg; Beppo Pohlmann	2,029	11
2	Séverine	"Ich glaub' an meine Träume"	Jack White; Kurt Hertha	2,717	10
3	Jennifer Kemp	"Wie Phönix aus der Asche"	Alexander Gordan; Norbert Hammerschmidt	1,965	12
4	Mel Jersey	"Schenk' mir eine Nacht"	Mel Jersey; Judith Jupe	3,227	7
5	Gaby Baginsky	"So wie Du bist"	Dietmar Kawohl; Michael Kunze	2,802	9
6	Marianne Rosenberg	"Blue-Jeans-Kinder"	Ralph Siegel; Bernd Meinunger	2,862	8
7	Mary Roos and David Hanselmann	"Lady"	Werner Böhm; Michael Chambosse	3,358	6
8	Paola	"Peter Pan"	Ralph Siegel; Bernd Meinunger	4,318	2
9	Denise	"Die Nacht der Lüge"	Joachim Heider; Michael Kunze	3,799	4
10	Hannes Schöner	"Nun sag' schon adieu"	Bernhard Vonficht, Harald Steinhauer; Andrea Andergast	3,914	3
11	Jürgen Marcus	"Ich würde gerne bei Dir sein"	Thomas Fuchsberger; Joachim Fuchsberger	3,439	5
12	Nicole	"Ein bißchen Frieden"	Ralph Siegel; Bernd Meinunger	5,116	1

== At Eurovision ==
Nicole was the eighteenth and final performer on the night of the Contest, following Ireland. At the close of the voting the song had received 161 points, placing first in a field of 18 competing countries. A 61-point gap was recorded between Nicole and the second-place finisher, Avi Toledano from Israel, setting a then record for the largest gap between first and second place. Only Luxembourg did not award Germany any points.

Known members of the German jury were Siegfried Doppler and Horst Senker.

The show was watched by 13.81 million viewers in Germany.

=== Voting ===
Points awarded to Germany
Score	Country
12 points	Cyprus; Denmark; Ireland; Israel; Portugal; Spain; Switzerland; Turkey; Yugoslavia
10 points	Belgium; Finland; Norway
8 points	Sweden; United Kingdom
7 points	
6 points	Netherlands
5 points	
4 points	
3 points	
2 points	
1 point	Austria

Points awarded by Germany
Score	Country
12 points	Israel
10 points	Norway
8 points	Luxembourg
7 points	Spain
6 points	Cyprus
5 points	Netherlands
4 points	Belgium
3 points	Ireland
2 points	Sweden
1 point	United Kingdom

== Congratulations: 50 Years of the Eurovision Song Contest ==
"Ein bißchen Frieden" was one of fourteen Eurovision songs chosen by fans and the EBU to participate in Congratulations, the fiftieth-anniversary contest. It was the only German entry in the contest. Unlike the majority of other living entrants, Nicole was unable to attend, so the performance simply combined a dance troupe with footage of Nicole's 1982 performance. It was followed by a pre-taped greeting from Nicole. "Ein bißchen Frieden" was performed fifth, following "Eres tú" and preceding "Nel blu dipinto di blu." After the first round, "Ein bißchen Frieden" was not one of the five songs chosen to proceed to the next round. It was later revealed that the song finished seventh, with 106 points. Notably, in spite of it being a major international hit and their only winning entry at the time (they would later win again five years later with Lena's "Satellite" at the 2010 contest), Germany only awarded "Ein bißchen Frieden" three points in the first round, with their twelve going instead to ABBA's "Waterloo." Their twelve points in the second round were awarded to "Nel blu dipinto di blu."

=== Voting ===
Points awarded to "Ein bißchen Frieden" (Round 1)
Score	Country
12 points	
10 points	
8 points	Iceland; Slovenia
7 points	Latvia; Lithuania; Portugal
6 points	Ireland
5 points	Finland; Norway; Poland
4 points	Denmark; Netherlands; Spain; Sweden; Switzerland
3 points	Austria; Croatia; Cyprus; Germany; Romania; Serbia and Montenegro; Turkey
2 points	Bosnia and Herzegovina; Israel
1 point	Andorra; Malta; Russia
