= Turkey in the Eurovision Song Contest 1982 =

- Eurovision Song Contest 1982
- Participating broadcaster: Turkish Radio and Television Corporation (TRT)
- Country: Turkey
- Selection process: 6. Eurovision Şarkı Yarışması Türkiye Finali
- Selection date: 7 March 1982

Competing entry
- Song: "Hani?"
- Artist: Neco
- Songwriters: Olcayto Ahmet Tuğsuz; Faik Tuğsuz

Placement
- Final result: 15th, 20 points

Participation chronology

Turkey was represented at the Eurovision Song Contest 1982 with the song "Hani?", written by Olcayto Ahmet Tuğsuz and Faik Tuğsuz, and performed by Neco. The Turkish participating broadcaster, the Turkish Radio and Television Corporation (TRT), selected its entry through a national final.

== Before Eurovision ==
=== 6. Eurovision Şarkı Yarışması Türkiye Finali ===
The Turkish Radio and Television Corporation (TRT) held the national final on 7 March 1982 at its studios in Ankara, hosted by Canan Kumbasar. Six songs were to compete but "Müzikle Yaşam" performed by Şenay withdrew from the competition. Instead five songs competed and the winner was determined by an expert jury.

Final – 7 March 1982
R/O	Artist	Song	Lyricist	Composer	Points	Place
1	Cantekin & Nilgün Onatkut	"Zannetme ki"	Çetin Kaya		—N/a	
2	Neco	"Bir Yaşam Öyküsü"	Fikret Şeneş	Selçuk Başar	—N/a	
3	Neco	"Hani?"	Faik Tuğsuz	Olcayto Ahmet Tuğsuz	12	1
4	Neco	"Rönesans"	Selçuk Başar		10	2
5	Neco	"Gramofon"	Aysel Gürel	Selmi Andak	9	3

== At Eurovision ==
On the night of the contest Neco performed 5th in the running order following United Kingdom and preceding Finland. At the close of the voting Hani had received 20 points placing Turkey 15th. The Turkish jury awarded its 12 points to Germany.

The Turkish jury included Mine Ant, Jale Özkasım, Fariz Acar, Hakan Şerafettinoğlu, Haluk Günuğur, Taner Acar, Muammer Tosun, Sezer Öktem, Gülsen Nas, Dilek Abışgil and Belma Eşiyok.

=== Voting ===
Points awarded to Turkey
Score	Country
12 points	
10 points	
8 points	Luxembourg
7 points	
6 points	
5 points	
4 points	
3 points	Austria; Norway; Switzerland
2 points	Netherlands
1 point	Finland

Points awarded by Turkey
Score	Country
12 points	Germany
10 points	United Kingdom
8 points	Spain
7 points	Austria
6 points	Belgium
5 points	Portugal
4 points	Yugoslavia
3 points	Luxembourg
2 points	Switzerland
1 point	Ireland
