= Stella Maessen =

Dutch singer

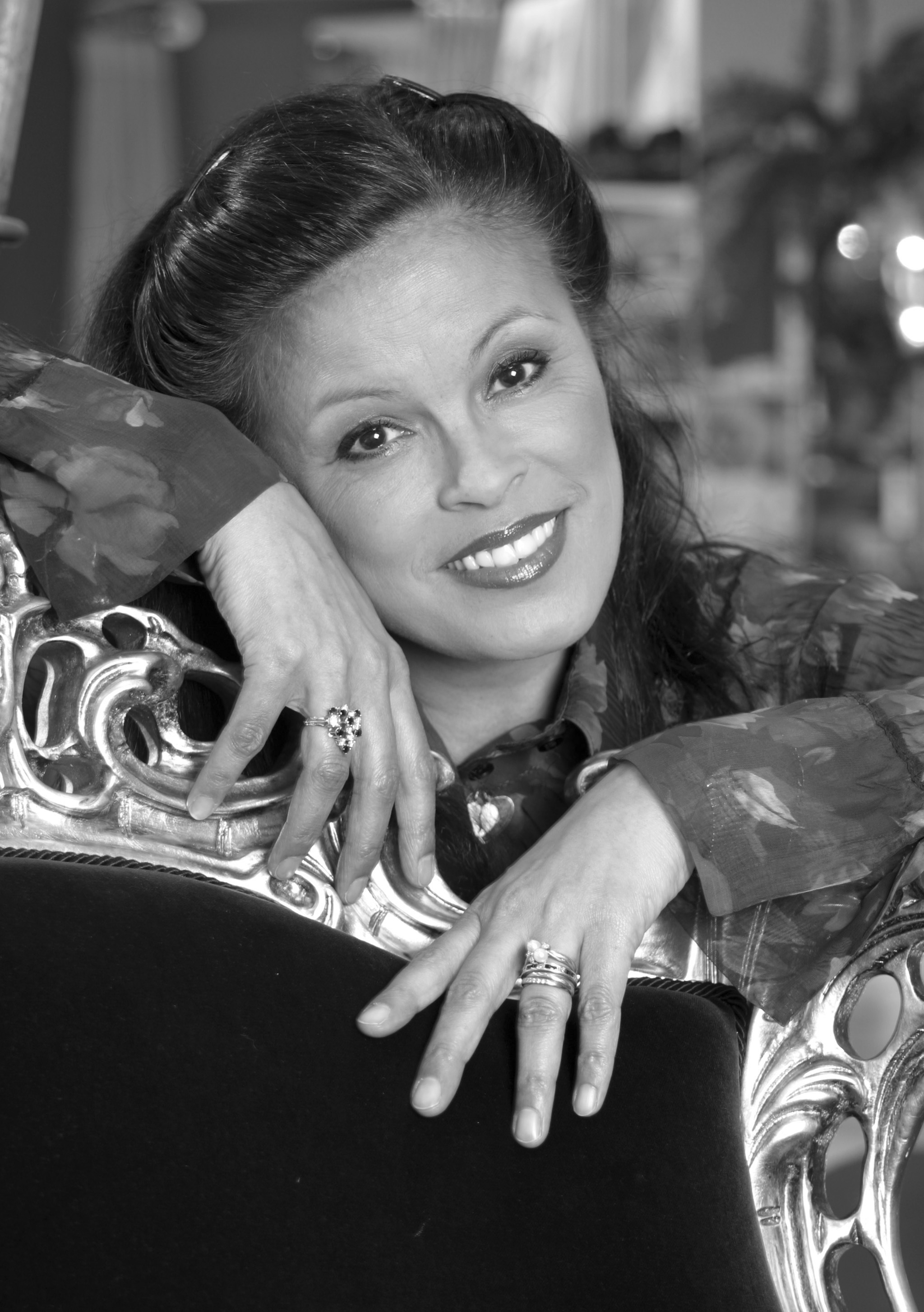

Background information
- Born: 6 August 1953 (age 73); Zandvoort, Netherlands
- Origin: Harderwijk and Veghel; Netherlands
- Genre: Pop
- Occupation: Singer
- Formerly of: Hearts of Soul; Dream Express

Stella Maessen (born 6 August 1953 in Zandvoort, North Holland) is a Dutch singer, best known for her participation in the Eurovision Song Contests of 1970, 1977 and 1982.

== Hearts of Soul ==
In 1969 Maessen and her older sisters Patricia and Bianca formed a group, calling themselves Hearts of Soul. Following several single releases, and a No. 11 chart hit with "Fat Jack", they took part in the 1970 Dutch Eurovision selection, where their song "Waterman" ("Aquarius") earned a narrow victory, qualifying them for the 15th Eurovision Song Contest, which took place on 21 March on home ground in Amsterdam. Technically, groups of more than two singers were still barred from Eurovision at that time, so to get around this they billed themselves as 'Patricia and the Hearts of Soul', implying that Stella and Bianca were backing singers to Patricia's lead. In a small field of 12, "Waterman" placed seventh.

== Dream Express ==
In 1973, the Maessens moved to Belgium, where they became in-demand backing vocalists. Bianca had married a Belgian singer, Luc Smets, and the four decided to form a group called Dream Express, enjoying immediate success with a single, also called "Dream Express", which reached No. 2 on the Flemish chart in 1976. In 1977, Dream Express entered, and won, the Belgian Eurovision selection with the song "A Million in One, Two, Three". Sung in English, it was a very contemporary track which was widely regarded as one of the favourites for that year's Eurovision, held in London on 7 May. Its seventh-place finish of 17 entrants was therefore considered something of a disappointment. Patricia left Dream Express soon afterwards, and the others carried on as LBS before disbanding in 1981.

== Solo ==
In 1981, now billed simply as Stella, Maessen participated in the Belgian selection as a solo artist with the song "Veel te veel" ("Much Too Many"), which reached the final but failed to win. She returned in 1982 with the French language song "Si tu aimes ma musique" ("If You Like My Music"), which was successful and went on to the 27th Eurovision in Harrogate, England on 24 April. Although that year's contest proved to be a one-horse race (with a runaway German victory), Maessen managed a creditable fourth place of 18 entries, also achieving the rare distinction of receiving points from every other participating country.

Maessen continued performing and recording until 1988, when her last single, "Flashlight", was released.

In November 2010 Stella released a new single with her two sisters Bianca and Doreen Maessen as Hearts of Soul: "Suddenly You".

Preceded by Lenny Kuhr with "De troubadour"	Netherlands in the Eurovision Song Contest (as Hearts of Soul); 1970	Succeeded by Saskia & Serge with "Tijd"
Preceded by Pierre Rapsat with "Judy et Cie"	Belgium in the Eurovision Song Contest (as Dream Express); 1977	Succeeded by Jean Vallée with "L'amour ça fait chanter la vie"
Preceded by Emly Starr with "Samson"	Belgium in the Eurovision Song Contest; 1982	Succeeded by Pas de Deux with "Rendez-vous"
