= Norway in the Eurovision Song Contest 1982 =

- Eurovision Song Contest 1982
- Participating broadcaster: Norsk rikskringkasting (NRK)
- Country: Norway
- Selection process: Melodi Grand Prix 1982
- Selection date: 20 March 1982

Competing entry
- Song: "Adieu"
- Artist: Jahn Teigen and Anita Skorgan
- Songwriters: Jahn Teigen; Herodes Falsk

Placement
- Final result: 12th, 40 points

Participation chronology

Norway was represented at the Eurovision Song Contest 1982 with the song "Adieu", composed by Jahn Teigen, with lyrics by Herodes Falsk, and performed by Jahn Teigen and Anita Skorgan. The Norwegian participating broadcaster, Norsk rikskringkasting (NRK), selected its entry through the Melodi Grand Prix 1982. This was a second Eurovision appearance for Teigen and a third for Skorgan.

== Before Eurovision ==
=== Melodi Grand Prix 1982 ===
Norsk rikskringkasting (NRK) held the Melodi Grand Prix 1982 at its studios in Oslo, hosted by Ivar Dyrhaug. Ten songs took part in the final, with the winner chosen by voting from 11 regional juries.

Final – 20 March 1982
R/O	Artist	Song	Composer	Lyricist	Points	Place
1	Anita Skorgan and Jahn Teigen	"Adjø"	Jahn Teigen	Herodes Falsk	116	1
2	Inger-Lise	"Lady Di"	Nissa Nyberget	Lars Mjøen	88	2
3	Trond Granlund	"Lisa"	Kristian Lindeman	Philip A. Kruse	67	5
4	Alex	"Perfekte engel"	Alex; Svein Gundersen	Lars Kilevold; Alex	75	4
5	Frank Aleksandersen	"Vi får, vi gir, vi går, vi blir"	Benny Borg		80	3
6	Dollie	"Det er deg jeg skal ha"	Benedicte Adrian; Ingrid Bjørnov	Benedicte Adrian; Ingrid Bjørnov; Ole A. Sørli	23	10
7	Freddy Dahl	"Café Jupiter"	Atle Bakken; Geir Holmsen	Trond Brænne	54	6
8	Gudny Aspaas	"Barnesinn"	Gudny Aspaas; Geir Langslet	Gudny Aspaas	41	9
9	Stiftelsen	"Romantikk"	Petter Henriksen	Kari Bremnes	48	7
10	Bo	"Kom heim"	Rolf Undsæt Løvland	Terje Formoe	46	8

Detailed Regional Jury Votes
R/O	Song	Trondheim	Bergen	Bodø	Stavanger	Tromsø	Kristiansand	Vadsø	Elverum	Ålesund	Porsgrunn	Oslo	Total
1	"Adjø"	12	12	12	12	10	8	8	10	10	12	10	116
2	"Lady Di"	8	2	8	8	5	7	12	12	8	6	12	88
3	"Lisa"	5	10	6	7	1	6	5	6	6	8	7	67
4	"Perfekte engel"	4	4	10	4	2	10	7	4	12	10	8	75
5	"Vi får, vi gir, vi går, vi blir"	10	6	5	10	4	12	10	8	5	7	3	80
6	"Det er deg jeg skal ha"	1	1	2	3	7	1	2	1	3	1	1	23
7	"Café Jupiter"	3	7	7	2	8	5	4	5	2	5	6	54
8	"Barnesinn"	6	5	4	5	6	3	3	3	1	3	2	41
9	"Romantikk"	7	3	3	1	12	4	6	2	4	2	4	48
10	"Kom heim"	2	8	1	6	3	2	1	7	7	4	5	46

== At Eurovision ==
On the evening of the final Teigen and Skorgan performed third in the running order, following Luxembourg and preceding the United Kingdom. Clocking in at only 2 minutes 10 seconds, "Adieu" was one of the shortest songs ever in a Eurovision final. At the close of voting "Adieu" had picked up 40 points, placing Norway 12th of the 18 entries. The Norwegian jury awarded its 12 points to Cyprus.

=== Voting ===
Points awarded to Norway
Score	Country
12 points	
10 points	Germany
8 points	
7 points	
6 points	Austria; Ireland; Luxembourg
5 points	
4 points	Cyprus; Sweden
3 points	
2 points	Belgium; Spain
1 point	

Points awarded by Norway
Score	Country
12 points	Cyprus
10 points	Germany
8 points	Sweden
7 points	Luxembourg
6 points	United Kingdom
5 points	Belgium
4 points	Switzerland
3 points	Turkey
2 points	Ireland
1 point	Israel
