= Kojo (singer) =

Finnish pop rock singer

Timo Kojo (born 9 May 1953) is a Finnish pop rock singer. He was born in Helsinki, and started his recording career in 1977 when his band, Madame George, released their only album, Madame George: What's Happening?.

Kojo's first solo album, So Mean, was a hit in Finland. The second sold equally well, though it was not considered quite as good. In 1981, however, his third solo album was a flop.

In the Eurovision Song Contest of 1982 he represented his country with the entry Nuku pommiin (Oversleep!), a rock song with music by Jim Pembroke and lyrics by Juice Leskinen; the conductor was Ossi Runne. The song performed in Finnish was a protest against nuclear bombs and the danger of a nuclear war in Europe (the Cold War was still under way in 1982). The song received no points (nul points). Despite this poor result, Kojo continued his career in his native country.

Kojo's music declined in popularity in Finland after 1982; however, he remains well known on the strength of his Eurovision career.

== Discography ==
- Madame George: What's Happening (1977)
- So Mean (1979)
- Lucky Street (1980)
- Go All the Way (1981)
- Hitparade (1982)
- Nuku pommiin or Bomb Out (1982)
- Time Won't Wait (1983)
- Bee tai bop (1985)
- Rommia sateessa (1986)
- Kaksi alkuperäistä: So Mean / Lucky Street (1990)
- Pyöri maa pyöri kuu (1990)
- Kojo and the Great Boogie Band (1993)
- Suloinen Maria (1997)
- 20 suosikkia – So Mean (1998)

== Sources ==
Wikipedia in Finnish in:

- Finnish page about Kojo

Preceded by Riki Sorsa with Reggae OK	Finland in the Eurovision Song Contest; 1982	Succeeded by Ami Aspelund with Fantasiaa
