= Portugal in the Eurovision Song Contest 1982 =

- Eurovision Song Contest 1982
- Participating broadcaster: Radiotelevisão Portuguesa (RTP)
- Country: Portugal
- Selection process: Festival RTP da Canção 1982
- Selection date: 6 March 1982

Competing entry
- Song: "Bem bom"
- Artist: Doce
- Songwriters: António Avelar de Pinho; Tozé Brito; Pedro Brito

Placement
- Final result: 13th, 32 points

Participation chronology

Portugal was represented at the Eurovision Song Contest 1982 with the song "Bem bom", written by António Avelar de Pinho, Tozé Brito, and Pedro Brito, and performed by Doce. The Portuguese participating broadcaster, Radiotelevisão Portuguesa (RTP), selected its entry at the Festival RTP da Canção 1982.

== Before Eurovision ==
=== Festival RTP da Canção 1982 ===
The logo of Festival RTP da Canção 1982

Radiotelevisão Portuguesa (RTP) held the Festival RTP da Canção 1982 at the Teatro Maria Matos in Lisbon on 6 March 1982, hosted by Alice Cruz and Fialho Gouveia. The winning song was chosen by the votes of 22 regional juries.

RTP received 767 submissions for the competition—around double the amount received for the previous edition.

Doce previously came 2nd in the 1980 Portuguese Final and in the 1981 Portuguese Final 4th. Two members of the group (Teresa Miguel & Fatima Padinha) were in the group Gemini that represented Portugal in 1978.

Final – 6 March 1982
R/O	Artist	Song	Points	Place
1	SARL	"Quero ser feliz agora"	147	4
2	Dina	"Em segredo"	74	8
3	Fernanda	"Vai mas vem"	52	10
4	Alexandra	"Até amanhecer"	156	3
5	Isa	"Sonho a dois"	27	12
6	Cândida Branca Flor	"Trocas e baldrocas"	176	2
7	Dina	"Gosto do teu gosto"	125	6
8	Joana	"Amor português"	77	7
9	Marco Paulo	"É o fim do mundo"	48	11
10	Doce	"Bem bom"	182	1
11	Bric-à-brac	"Tudo tim-tim por tim-tim"	73	9
12	Broa de Mel	"Banha da cobra estica e não dobra"	139	5

== At Eurovision ==
On the night of the final Doce performed first in the running order, preceding Luxembourg. At the close of voting "Bem bom" had received 32 points, placing Portugal 13th of the 18 entries. The Portuguese jury awarded its 12 points to the winner song from Germany.

Members of the Portuguese jury included José Vacondeus, Filipa Corte Real, Ilda Cocco Leote, José Eduardo Meira da Cunha, Maria Isabel Soares da Rocha, José Carlos Magalhães Ferreira, Maria José Soveral Gomes, Mário Nuno dos Santos Queirós, Carlos Ribeiro Luís, Frederico Hogan Teves, and Ana Manuela Preto Pacheco.

=== Voting ===
Points awarded to Portugal
Score	Country
12 points	
10 points	
8 points	
7 points	Luxembourg
6 points	Sweden
5 points	Turkey
4 points	Netherlands; United Kingdom
3 points	
2 points	Finland; Ireland
1 point	Israel; Switzerland

Points awarded by Portugal
Score	Country
12 points	Germany
10 points	Israel
8 points	Belgium
7 points	Sweden
6 points	Luxembourg
5 points	Cyprus
4 points	United Kingdom
3 points	Denmark
2 points	Switzerland
1 point	Ireland
