= Austria in the Eurovision Song Contest 1982 =

- Eurovision Song Contest 1982
- Participating broadcaster: Österreichischer Rundfunk (ORF)
- Country: Austria
- Selection process: National final
- Selection date: 25 March 1982

Competing entry
- Song: "Sonntag"
- Artist: Mess
- Songwriters: Michael Scheickl; Rudolf Leve

Placement
- Final result: 9th, 57 points

Participation chronology

Austria was represented at the Eurovision Song Contest 1982 with the song "Sonntag", composed by Michael Mell, with lyrics by Rudolf Leve, and performed by the band Mess, consisting of Fritz (real name Michael Scheickl) and Elisabeth 'Lizzi' Engstler. The Austrian participating broadcaster Österreichischer Rundfunk (ORF), selected its entry through a national final.

== Before Eurovision ==
=== National final ===
Österreichischer Rundfunk (ORF) held the national final at the ORF-Zentrum in Vienna, hosted by Andreas Steppan. The winning song was chosen by 290 people who voted by telephone.

Final – 25 March 1982
R/O	Artist	Song	Points	Place
1	Mainstreet	"Marionettentheater"	196	12
2	Lizzy Engstler	"Du"	534	4
3	Wallner and Licha	"Tagebücher"	421	9
4	Mainstreet	"Pop-Musik"	514	5
5	Sheila Edwards	"Bitte, vergiss mich"	197	11
6	Mess	"Sonntag"	1,655	1
7	Rusty and Jay	"Sing ganz einfach ein Lied"	743	3
8	Mainstreet	"Ja ja, oui oui, yes yes, sì sì"	209	10
9	Windecker and Wessler	"Zeit"	436	8
10	Fritz	"Träumen"	507	6
11	Aniko Benkö, Lia Burger and Helmut Arent	"Marionetten"	460	7
12	Mainstreet	"Rock 'n' Roll Revival"	798	2

== At Eurovision ==
On the evening of the final Mess performed 10th in the running order, following Sweden and preceding Belgium. At the close of voting "Sonntag" placing Austria 9th of the 18 entries. The Austrian jury awarded its 12 points to the United Kingdom.

=== Voting ===
Points awarded to Austria
Score	Country
12 points	
10 points	United Kingdom
8 points	Spain
7 points	Cyprus; Turkey
6 points	Belgium; Denmark
5 points	Ireland
4 points	Israel; Yugoslavia
3 points	
2 points	
1 point	

Points awarded by Austria
Score	Country
12 points	United Kingdom
10 points	Switzerland
8 points	Sweden
7 points	Israel
6 points	Norway
5 points	Cyprus
4 points	Belgium
3 points	Turkey
2 points	Luxembourg
1 point	Germany
