= Sweden in the Eurovision Song Contest 1982 =

- Eurovision Song Contest 1982
- Participating broadcaster: Sveriges Television (SVT)
- Country: Sweden
- Selection process: Melodifestivalen 1982
- Selection date: 27 February 1982

Competing entry
- Song: "Dag efter dag"
- Artist: Chips
- Songwriters: Lasse Holm; Monica Forsberg

Placement
- Final result: 8th, 67 points

Participation chronology

Sweden was represented at the Eurovision Song Contest 1982 with the song "Dag efter dag", composed by Lasse Holm, with lyrics by Monica Forsberg, and performed by the band Chips. The Swedish participating broadcaster, Sveriges Television (SVT), selected its entry through Melodifestivalen 1982.

== Before Eurovision ==
=== Melodifestivalen 1982 ===
Melodifestivalen 1982 was the selection for the 22nd song to represent Sweden at the Eurovision Song Contest. It was the 21st time that this system of picking a song had been used. 90 songs were submitted to Sveriges Television (SVT) for the competition. The final was held in the Lisebergshallen in Gothenburg on 27 February 1982, presented by Fredrik Belfrage and was broadcast on TV1 but was not broadcast on radio.

The 10 songs were reduced to 5 finalists, which were then voted on by 9 juries split according to age ranges. Chips formed by Elisabeth Andreasson and Kikki Danielsson had both previously come 2nd in the Melodifestivalen 1981 in a group called 'Sweet 'n' Chips'. Kikki Danielsson had previously came joint 1st in the Melodifestivalen 1978 but lost out on a tie-break and previously came 4th in the group Chips in 1980.

R/O	Artist	Song	Songwriter(s)	Result
1	Little Gerhard and Yvonne Olsson	"Hand i hand med dig"	Little Gerhard; Börje Carlsson	—N/a
2	Lena Ericsson	"Någonting har hänt"	Staffan Ehrling; Britt Lindeborg	Qualified
3	Chattanooga	"Hallå hela pressen"	Strix Q; Mia Kempff	Qualified
4	Charlie Hillson	"Då kommer min ängel"	Charlie Hillson	—N/a
5	Ann-Louise Hanson	"Kärleken lever"	Anders Glenmark	Qualified
6	Annika Rydell and Lars Westman	"Här har du din morgondag"	Lasse Westman; Kjell Isaksson; Inger Isaksson	—N/a
7	Liza Öhman	"Hey-hi-ho"	Martin Contra; Björn Frisén	Qualified
8	Shanes	"Fender 62"	Kit Sundqvist; Håkan Thanger	—N/a
9	Maria Wickman	"Dags att börjar om igen"	Hasse Olsson	—N/a
10	Chips	"Dag efter dag"	Lasse Holm; Monica Forsberg	Qualified

Artist	Song	Songwriter(s)	Points	Place
Lena Ericsson	"Någonting har hänt"	Staffan Ehrling; Britt Lindeborg	39	2
Chattanooga	"Hallå hela pressen"	Strix Q; Mia Kempff	28	4
Ann-Louise Hanson	"Kärleken lever"	Anders Glenmark	25	5
Liza Öhman	"Hey-hi-ho"	Martin Contra; Björn Frisén	33	3
Chips	"Dag efter dag"	Lasse Holm; Monica Forsberg	64	1

Voting
Song	15–20	20–25	25–30	30–35	35–40	40–45	45–50	50–55	55–60	Total
"Någonting har hänt"	2	8	4	1	6	4	6	4	4	39
"Hallå hela pressen"	8	1	6	6	2	2	1	1	1	28
"Kärleken lever"	1	2	1	2	1	6	4	6	2	25
"Hey-hi-ho"	4	4	2	8	4	1	2	2	6	33
"Dag efter dag"	6	6	8	4	8	8	8	8	8	64

== At Eurovision ==
Sweden performed 9th on the evening of the contest, following Cyprus and preceding Austria. They finished 8th with 67 points.

=== Voting ===
Points awarded to Sweden
Score	Country
12 points	
10 points	
8 points	Austria; Denmark; Norway
7 points	Portugal
6 points	
5 points	Belgium; Netherlands; United Kingdom
4 points	Spain; Switzerland
3 points	Finland; Ireland; Luxembourg
2 points	Germany; Yugoslavia
1 point	

Points awarded by Sweden
Score	Country
12 points	Yugoslavia
10 points	Israel
8 points	Germany
7 points	Belgium
6 points	Portugal
5 points	Ireland
4 points	Norway
3 points	Netherlands
2 points	Switzerland
1 point	Denmark
