= Arlette Zola =

Swiss singer

Arlette Zola (born Arlette Jaquet, 29 April 1949, in Fribourg), is a singer who represented Switzerland in the Eurovision Song Contest 1982. Her song, "Amour on t'aime", was an upbeat number. Zola was placed third behind Germany and Israel. She made two further attempts at reaching the Eurovision finals. In 1984, she took third place in the Swiss final with Emporte-moi. 1985 also saw her in third spot, this time with Aime-moi, performed with Helder and the Heldernauts.

An early Arlette Zola song, "Je suis folle de tant t'aimer", dating back to the 1960s, can be heard on the CD Swinging Mademoiselles.

== Discography ==
- 1965 Un peu d'amour, Libéria
- 1966 Elles sont coquines, Disc AZ
- 1967 Arlette Zola, Disc AZ
- 1967 Deux garçons pour une fille, Disc AZ
- 1967 J n'aime que vous. Disc AZ
- 1968 Musique en tête, Disc AZ LP
- 1969 C'est toute la terre, Disc Concert Hall LP
- 1969 La marchande de bonbon, Vogue
- 1970 L'été, Vogue
- 1971 Je suis folle de tant t'aimer, Vogue
- 1972 Pour que vienne enfin ce grand matin, Evasion
- 1977 Tu inventais des saisons, Tourel
- 1980 Offre moi un sourire, Libéria
- 1981 Frappe dans tes mains, Libéria
- 1981 Les fiancés du lac de Côme, LP Libéria
- 1982 Amour on t'aime, LP Jupiter Records
- 1982 Je n'ai pas changé, LP Jupiter Records
- 1983 Billy Boogie, LP Vogue
- 1984 Hasta manana amore mio, Disc Ibach
- 1990 Mais moi je l'aime, Libéria
- 2003 Laissez-moi encore chanter, Azo
- 2005 Amour... Amitié, Azo
- 2007 Le bonheur ne coûte rien, Azo
- 2009 Souvenir, mes anées 6o

Awards and achievements
Preceded by Peter, Sue & Marc with "Io senza te"	Switzerland in the Eurovision Song Contest; 1982	Succeeded by Mariella Farré with "Io così non ci sto"
