= Jacky Lafon =

Belgian actress

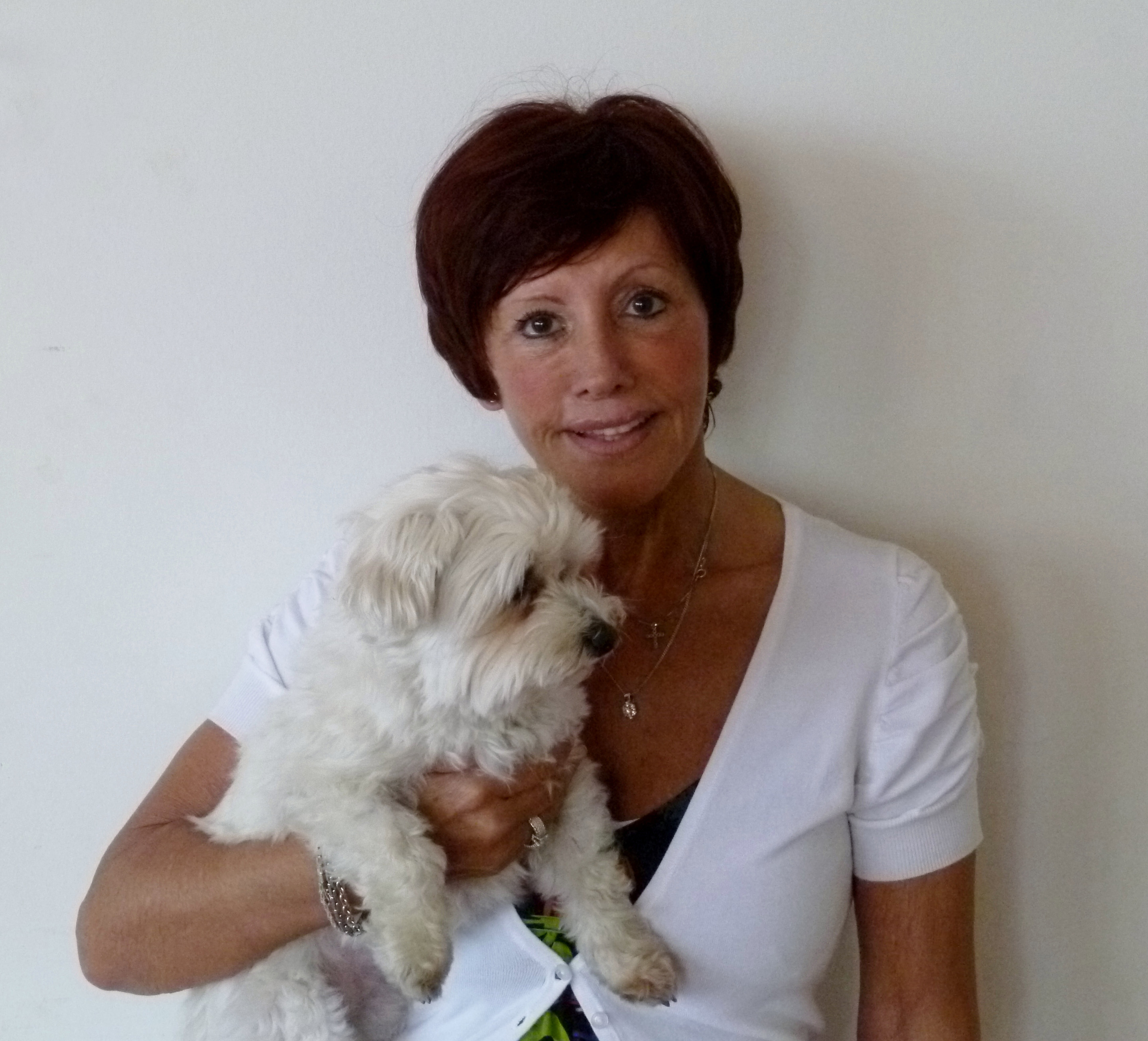
- Lafon in 2011
- Born: 21 November 1946 (age 79); Dendermonde, Belgium
- Occupation: Actress
- Website: Official website

Jacky Lafon (born 21 November 1946) is a Flemish actress known for playing one of the lead fictional characters‍—‌Rita Van den Bossche‍—‌in the television series Familie that aired its first episode on the Flemish television channel VTM, in the Dutch language, on 30 December 1991. Familie remains a popular soap opera, airing its 1,000th episode in 1996 and as of 2016 is in its 25th year of production.

== Early life and career ==
Lafon was born on 21 November 1946 in Dendermonde, East Flanders, Belgium. At age eight, she began her acting career with her first appearance in her school's play of Sleeping Beauty. At age nineteen, she went on tour abroad with the Analog Roland Orchestra from Bruges. Yvonne Verbeeck and Gaston Berghmans offered her a platform in the variety theatre Ancienne Belgique in Antwerp, after which she was offered a contract by who was then the artistic director.

In 1991, Lafon was cast to play the character Rita Van den Bossche on what would become Belgium's longest-running television soap opera, Familie.

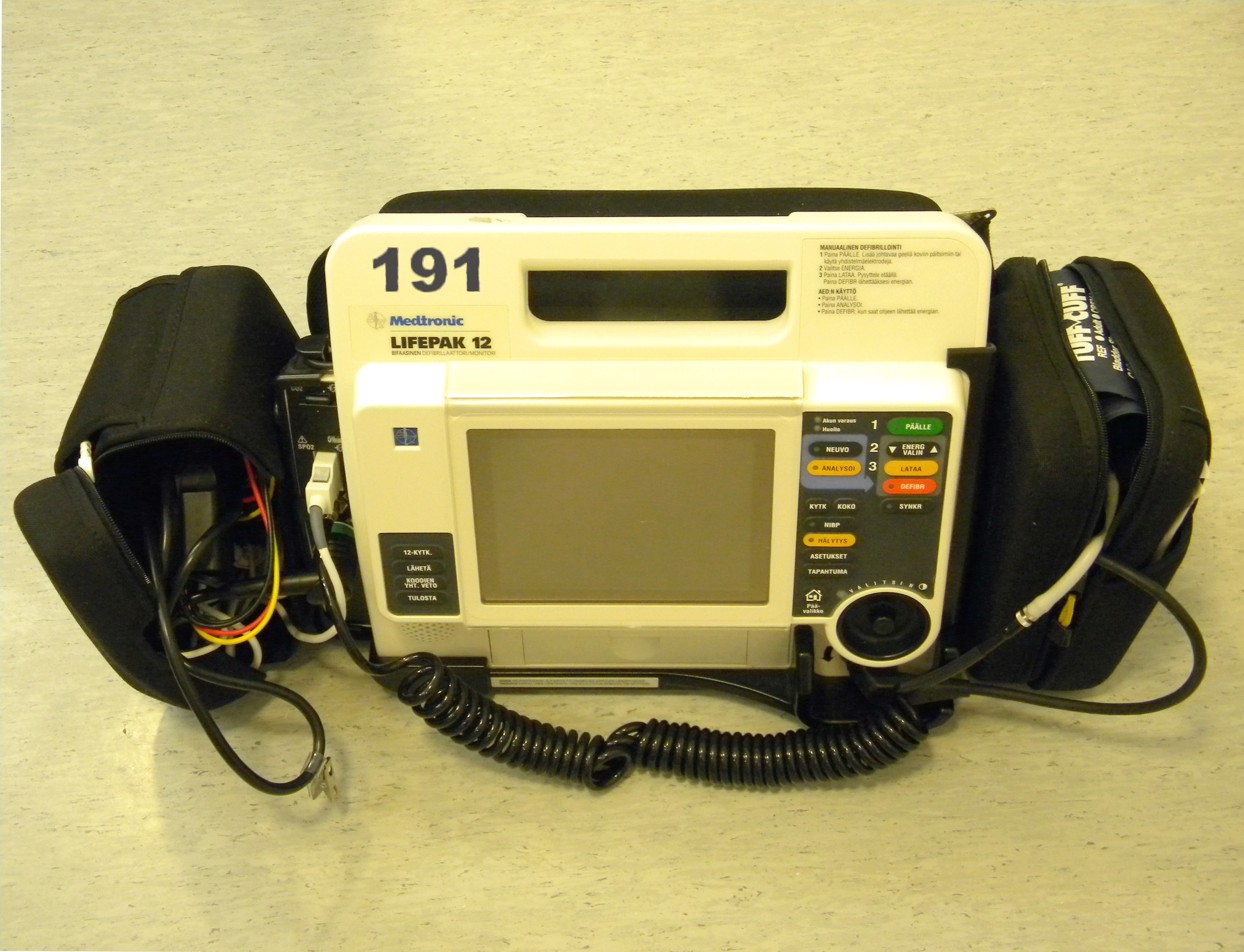
A defibrillator

During a 2006 taping of this soap, Lafon was seriously injured while taping a scene in which her character Rita relapsed into alcoholism and had to be resuscitated. The defibrillator used in the scene was mistakenly turned on, giving Lafon a real electric shock which caused burns to her chest and bruising on her ribs.

In April 2014, Lafon reported that she was suffering from panic attacks and shortness of breath and that her hair was falling out. On 24 June, she announced that, after 23 years, she was leaving Familie, stating "I cannot take it anymore". The announcement of Lafon's departure from Familie caused shock, with the soap's head writer Hugo Van Laere stating that "Rita will not be killed off or played by another actress. There is only one person who can play Rita, and that is Jacky."

In late 2015, Lafon made her first appearance on television since leaving Familie the prior year, in the popular tongue-in-cheek quiz show De Slimste Mens ter Wereld (The Smartest Person in the World). After this appearance, she denounced the salary she received on Familie, which she said was less than that of her daughter Nathalie, who worked as an entertainer at the Bobbejaanland theme park. By December of that year, Lafon said that she wished to return to the soap, stating "I miss it every day". The producers of Familie replied that she would not return in 2015 but could possibly be a guest during the 2016 season. Lafon eventually returned in 2024 and 2025 for two special occasions. She is set to return for a longer period in early 2026.

== Private life ==
From 1989 to 1995, Lafon was married to the Belgian musician Ernest Adriaensen of the musical group De Strangers. She is active in many civic activities and charity projects, such as aiding cancer patients, disadvantaged children and victims of various diseases. She lives in an up-scale apartment in Blankenberge.
