= Ireland in the Eurovision Song Contest 1982 =

- Eurovision Song Contest 1982
- Participating broadcaster: Radio Telefís Éireann (RTÉ)
- Country: Ireland
- Selection process: National Song Contest
- Selection date: 14 March 1982

Competing entry
- Song: "Here Today Gone Tomorrow"
- Artist: The Duskeys
- Songwriter: Sally Keating

Placement
- Final result: 11th, 49 points

Participation chronology

Ireland was represented at the Eurovision Song Contest 1982 with the song "Here Today Gone Tomorrow", written by Sally Keating, and performed by The Duskeys. The Irish participating broadcaster, Radio Telefís Éireann (RTÉ), selected its entry through a national final.

== Before Eurovision ==
=== National Song Contest ===
Eight finalists took part in the seventeenth edition of the National Contest on 14 March 1982 in Dublin, with the winner being chosen by the votes of 11 regional juries.

The winners, The Duskeys, previously took part in the 1981 National Song Contest performing as 'The Duskey Sisters' placing joint 3rd.

The interval act was Bucks Fizz, the 1981 British entrants and winners of Eurovision 1981.

R/O	Artist	Song	Points	Place
1	The Duskeys	"Here Today Gone Tomorrow"	19	1
2	Iain Freeman	"Qu'il passe"	14	4
3	Chips	"Tissue of Lies"	2	8
4	Tony Kenny	"Wherever You Go"	8	6
5	Heads	"Goodbye to Loneliness"	10	5
6	Deuce of Hearts	"All Over Again"	15	3
7	Jody McStravick	"Is There Anyone Out There?"	17	2
8	Sheeba	"Go raibh maith agat"	3	7

Detailed Regional Jury Votes
R/O	Song	Dublin Regional	Letterkenny	Clonmel	Galway	Dundalk	Cork	Castlebar	Listowel	Cavan	Tullamore	Dublin Central	Total
1	"Here Today Gone Tomorrow"		2	2		5	1		2	3		4	19
2	"Qu'il passe"	2	1	1		1	2	2	5				14
3	"Tissue of Lies"		1				1						2
4	"Wherever You Go"		1	1			3	2		1			8
5	"Goodbye to Loneliness"		1	1			1	3		2	1	1	10
6	"All Over Again"	2	2	1	2			1	1	1	2	3	15
7	"Is There Anyone Out There?"	4			6	2					5		17
8	"Go raibh maith agat"			2						1			3

== At Eurovision ==
Ireland performed 17th. They finished 11th out of 18 with 49 points.

The contest was broadcast on RTÉ 1 (with commentary by Larry Gogan) and on radio station RTÉ Radio 1 (with commentary by Pat Kenny). RTÉ appointed John Skehan as its spokesperson to announce the Irish jury's votes.

=== Voting ===
Points awarded to Ireland
Score	Country
12 points	
10 points	
8 points	Yugoslavia
7 points	United Kingdom
6 points	Switzerland
5 points	Cyprus; Denmark; Sweden
4 points	
3 points	Germany; Israel; Spain
2 points	Norway
1 point	Portugal; Turkey

Points awarded by Ireland
Score	Country
12 points	Germany
10 points	Luxembourg
8 points	Switzerland
7 points	United Kingdom
6 points	Norway
5 points	Austria
4 points	Belgium
3 points	Sweden
2 points	Portugal
1 point	Denmark
