= Gemini (Portuguese band) =

Portuguese band

- Origin: Portugal
- Members: Fátima Padinha; Teresa Miguel; Tozé Brito; Mike Sergeant
- Past members: Isabel Ferrão

Gemini was a Portuguese band from the 1970s. The members were Fátima Padinha, Teresa Miguel, Tozé Brito and Mike Sergeant.

The group started in 1976, with Tozé Brito, Teresa Miguel, Mike Sergeant and Isabel Ferrão.

In 1977 they participated in the Portuguese national final in order to represent the country in the Eurovision Song Contest with the song "Portugal no coração". The song won. However, every song was sung by two performers, and the audience preferred Os Amigos over Gemini. Toze Brito and Mike Sergeant had previously been in the grupo Quarteto 1111 in the Portuguese National Finals. After their participation, in 1977, Isabel Ferrão left the group and was replaced by Fátima Padinha.

They won the national final in 1978 with the song "Dai li dou". However, they only reached the 17th position.

Teresa and Fátima would represent Portugal once more in 1982 in the band Doce.

== Discography ==
=== LPS ===
- Pensando em Ti (LP, 1977)
- Dai Li Dou (LP, 1979)
- Os Maiores Êxitos dos Gemini (LP, Polygram)

=== Singles ===
- Pensando Em Ti / Pequenas Coisas (Single, Polygram, 1976)
- Portugal No Coração / Cantiga de Namorar (Single, Polygram, 1977)
- Uma Flor À Janela/Vidas Fáceis (Single, Polygram, 1977)
- É Natal, Feliz Natal / Natal de Um Homem Só (Single, Polygram, 1977)
- O Circo E A Cidade / Ano Novo é Vida Nova (Single, Polygram, 1978)
- Dai Li Dou / Gente Lá da Minha Rua (Single, Polygram, 1978)
- Dancemos Juntos / O Tempo E O Nada (Single, Polygram, 197*)
- Quero Abraçar-te Sexta-Feira à Noite (Single, Polygram, 1979)

Awards and achievements
Preceded by Os Amigos with "Portugal no coração"	Portugal in the Eurovision Song Contest; 1978	Succeeded by Manuela Bravo with "Sobe, sobe, balão sobe"
