= Yarin Kimor =

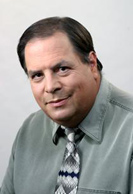
Yarin Kimor

Yarin Kimor (Hebrew: ירין קימור; born July 27, 1952) is an Israeli author, TV producer, international speaker, and creative thinking advocate. In his television career, Kimor has produced several films about the Israeli Mossad.

== Biography ==
Kimor was raised in Haifa and he is the son of Prof. Baruch Kimor (Komrovski), the pioneer of the Mediterranean Plankton research. Kimor served in Golani Brigade during the Yom Kippur War.

Kimor is a graduate of Hebrew University and a recipient of a scholarship to the World Press Institute.

Kimor served as an Editor and Director in Israel Channel 1 TV. Among others, he co-directed the science show, and served as the education reporter. His documentary films have been distributed worldwide. He was the main editor and presenter of the investigative program Mabat Sheni, and was the first to reveal the facts behind the Munich massacre of the Israeli athletes at the 1972 Summer Olympics and the undercover war that the Mossad waged against the perpetrators, Black September.

== Documentaries ==
Over the years, Kimor has directed several documentaries, most of them about Israeli secret services.

- "Sealed Lips" - Yitzhak Hofi and 5 heads of the Mossad and 5 heads of branches of the Mossad speak about special missions of the Mossad, for example the assassination of Vedia Hadayd, the Iraqi nuclear scientist before bombing the Iraqi nuclear reactor. In addition to discussing how the Israelis obtained information before the raid on the airport to rescue the Israeli hostages in Entebbe
- "The Spy Who Came back from the Cold" - the story of Victor Grayevsky, a spy and a Jewish-Polish journalist who hand the Israeli Mossad the secret speech of Nikita Khrushchev
- "The Avengers" - seven-episode TV series about Jews who attempted to take revenge against Nazis after the war.
- "Jenny May" - mini TV series - three episodes about the mysterious life and death of Jenny May, a dolphin trainer and a secret agent
- "Heroes Against their Will" - Documentary series of seven chapters which tells the stories of people caught up in life-threatening situations in their lives, without hope and without apparent chance, and dealt with them successfully

== Books ==
- Making the Impossible Possible – deals with methods of releasing mental fixations in order to develop creative thinking.
- Actually, No! - deals with 750 “truths” are which actually not true. Including an analysis of who “pulls the strings” behind these “truths”, and who profits from them, and why we are unwilling to correct them even when we know the truth.
