= Bill van Dijk =

Dutch singer and musical performer (born 1947)

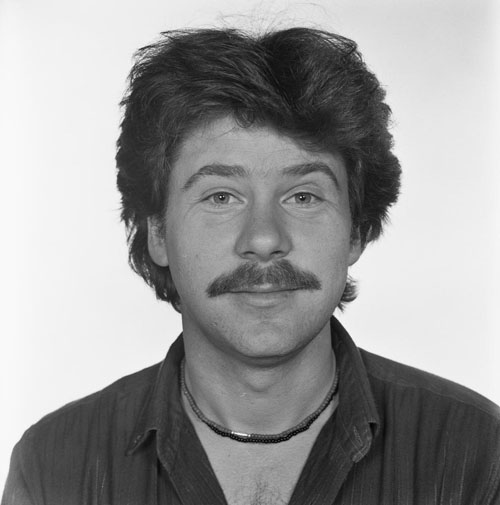
- Bill van Dijk in 1982
- Born: Willem Edsger van Dijk; 22 December 1947 (age 78); Rotterdam, Netherlands
- Years active: 1971–

Willem Edsger "Bill" van Dijk (born 22 December 1947) is a Dutch singer and musical performer.

He is best known for his rendition of the Wilhelmus (the national anthem of the Netherlands), which he performed on countless occasions in football stadiums. Moreover, Van Dijk worked on various musical productions. In 1982, he represented the Netherlands in the Eurovision Song Contest. His song, "Jij en ik", written by Dick Bakker (music), Liselore Gerritsen (lyrics) and Peter Schön (musical arrangement), failed to make an impression in Harrogate: it finished 16th with only 8 points.

He performed voices on Sesamstraat, the Dutch co-production of Sesame Street. Van Dijk did the voices of Roosevelt Franklin, Clementine, and many of the rock singers on the show (such as Little Chrissy and Bip Bipadotta). He was active on Sesamstraat until the early 1990s.

Van Dijk portrayed the title character in both the Dutch and Broadway productions of Cyrano: The Musical in the early 1990s. He also played one of the lead roles in the Dutch production of the musical HAIR in the early 1970s, performing in Amsterdam at The Desmet Theatre and touring throughout the country.

He also played Clopin in the Disney movie The Hunchback of Notre Dame (1996 film) in the Dutch version.

Awards and achievements
Preceded by Linda Williams with "Het is een wonder"	Netherlands in the Eurovision Song Contest; 1982	Succeeded by Bernadette with "Sing Me a Song"
