= Finland in the Eurovision Song Contest 1982 =

- Eurovision Song Contest 1982
- Participating broadcaster: Yleisradio (Yle)
- Country: Finland
- Selection process: Euroviisukarsinta 1982
- Selection date: 19 February 1982

Competing entry
- Song: "Nuku pommiin"
- Artist: Kojo
- Songwriters: Jim Pembroke; Juice Leskinen

Placement
- Final result: 18th, 0 points

Participation chronology

Finland was represented at the Eurovision Song Contest 1982 with the song "Nuku pommiin", composed by Jim Pembroke, with lyrics by Juice Leskinen, and performed by Kojo. The Finnish participating broadcaster, Yleisradio (Yle), selected its entry through a national final.

== Before Eurovision ==
=== Euroviisukarsinta 1982 ===
Yleisradio (Yle) invited ten composers for the competition. The composers got to choose between Ami Aspelund, Kojo, Opus 5, and Tapani Kansa to perform their songs. The national final was held on 19 February 1982 at the Kulttuuritalo in Helsinki, hosted by Heikki Kahila. The winner was chosen by an expert jury.

Final – 19 February 1982
R/O	Artist	Song	Songwriter(s)	Points	Place
1	Opus 5	"Omenakuu"	Upi Sorvali; Jukka Virtanen	63	4
2	Tapani Kansa	"Palaan..."	Toni Edelmann; Jussi Parviainen	52	8
3	Kojo	"Videovenus"	Jukka Siikavire; Jussi Tuominen	64	3
4	Ami Aspelund	"Mitt äppelträd"	Veikko Samuli; Marita Lindquist	82	2
5	Tapani Kansa	"Paista päivä"	Toivo Kärki; Vexi Salmi	30	10
6	Ami Aspelund	"Isä"	Kari Kuusamo; Monica Aspelund	60	6
7	Tapani Kansa	"Laulujen maa"	Olli Ahvenlahti; Esko Salervo	54	7
8	Kojo	"Nuku pommiin"	Jim Pembroke; Juice Leskinen	95	1
9	Ami Aspelund	"Sambanja"	Nono Söderberg; Impi Riimi	61	5
10	Tapani Kansa	"Angela"	Kassu Halonen; Pauli Puomi	44	9

== At Eurovision ==
On the night of the final Kojo performed 6th in the running order, following Turkey and preceding Switzerland. Kojo was accompanied by Juha Björninen and Pave Maijanen as guitarists and backing vocalists, Häkä Virtanen as a bassist and a backing vocalist, Jim Pembroke as a keyboardist, a backing vocalist and a bass drum player, and Keimo Hirvonen as a drummer. Originally, Opus 5 was supposed to accompany Kojo as backing vocalists. At the close of voting "Nuku pommiin" received nul points, placing Finland 18th (last) of the 18 entries. The Finnish jury awarded its 12 points to the runner up song from Israel.

=== Voting ===
Finland did not receive any points at the Eurovision Song Contest 1982.

Points awarded by Finland
Score	Country
12 points	Israel
10 points	Germany
8 points	Cyprus
7 points	Luxembourg
6 points	Spain
5 points	Belgium
4 points	United Kingdom
3 points	Sweden
2 points	Portugal
1 point	Turkey
