= Harrogate Convention Centre =

Convention centre in Harrogate, North Yorkshire, England

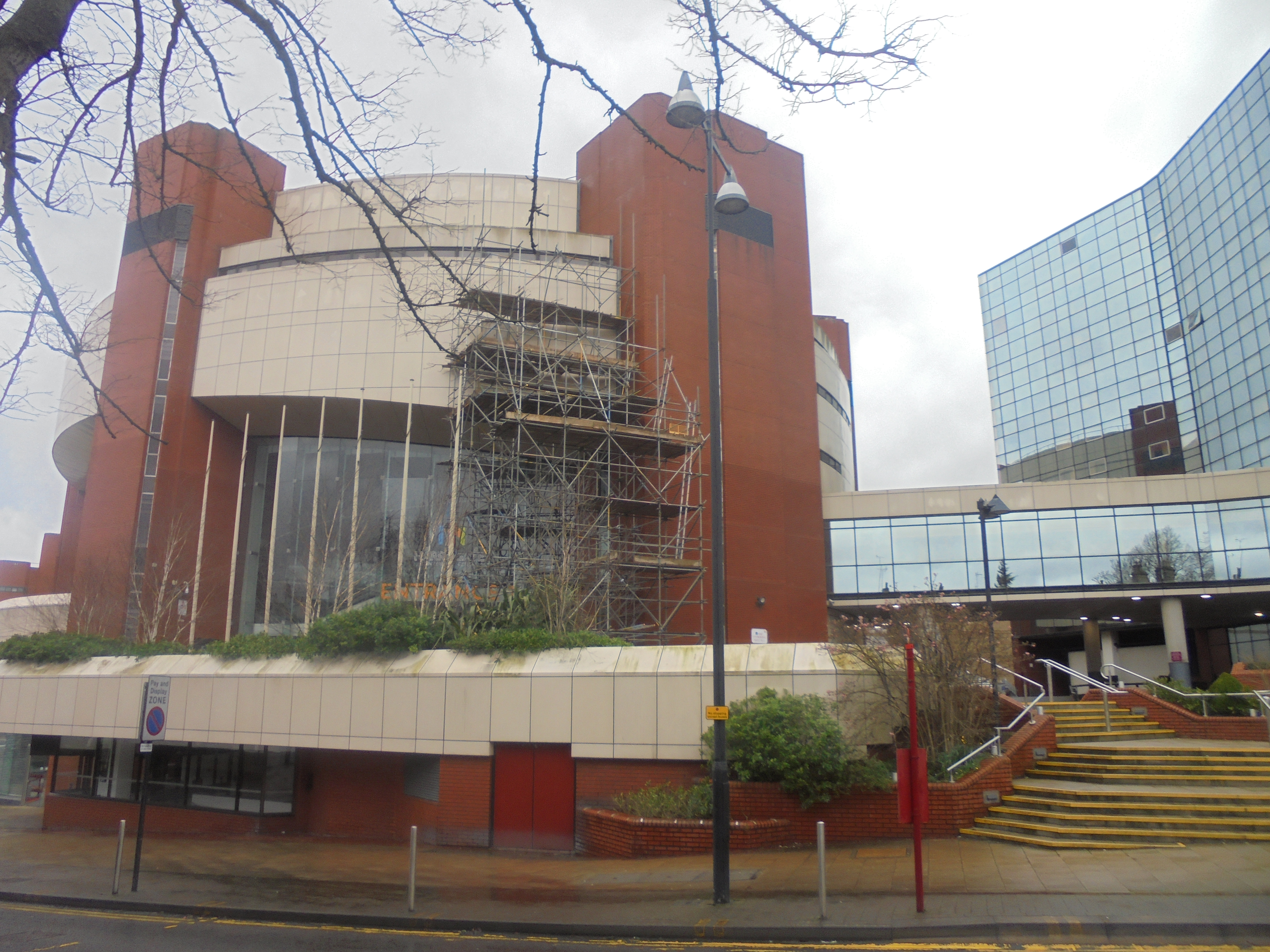
- Harrogate Convention Centre in February 2020
- Interactive map of Harrogate Convention Centre
- Former names: Harrogate International Centre
- Location: Harrogate, North Yorkshire
- Coordinates: 53°59′48.48″N 1°32′29″W
- Owner: North Yorkshire Council
- Capacity: 2,000 (Auditorium); 1,600 (Exhibition Halls); 600 (Queens Suite); 1,000 (Royal Hall)

Construction
- Opened: 1982
- Renovated: 2009–2014
- Expanded: 2009–2014

Website
- Official website

Harrogate Convention Centre is a convention and exhibition centre in Harrogate, North Yorkshire, England.

== History ==
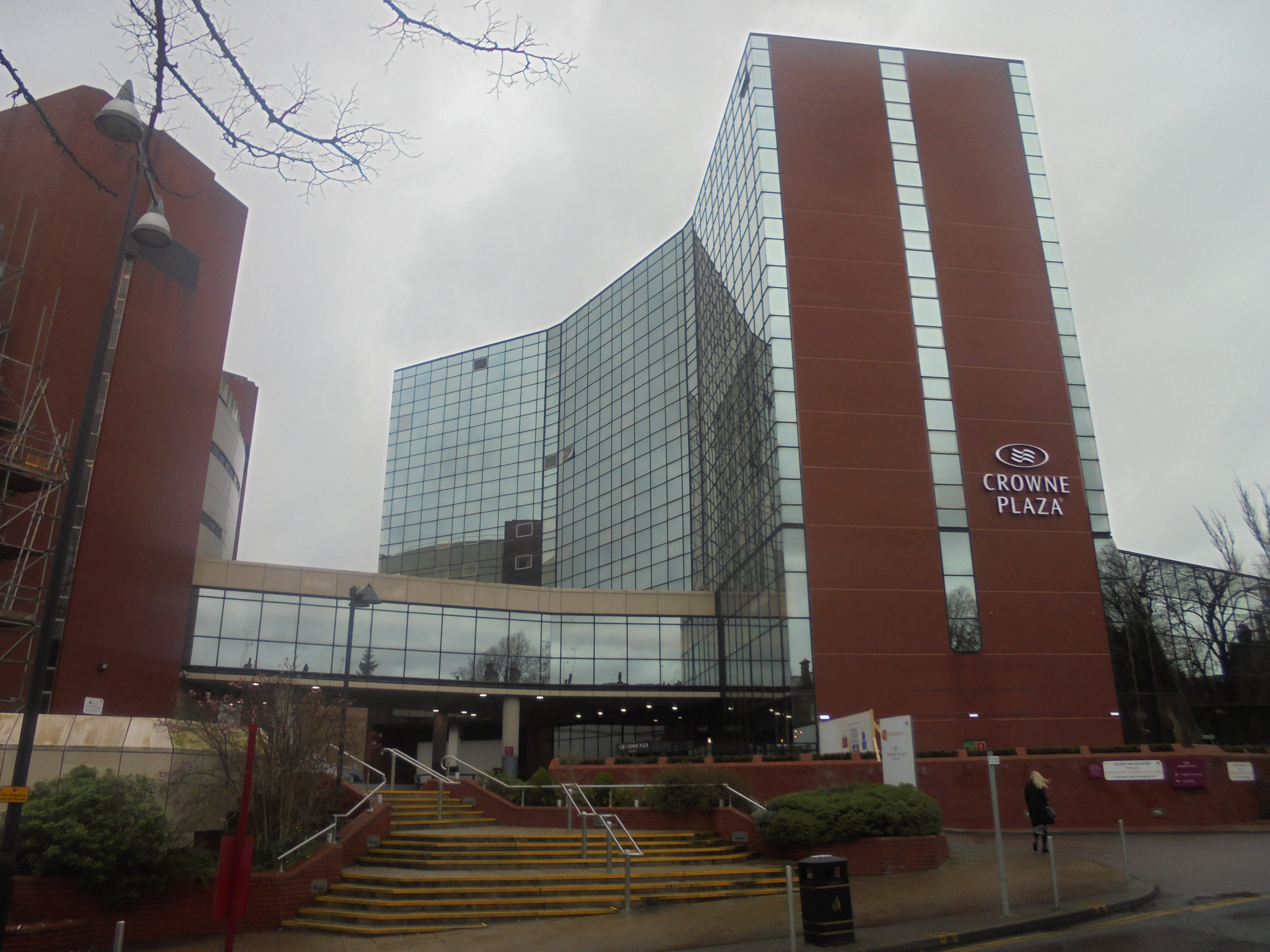
Crowne Plaza Hotel in 2020

Previously named Harrogate International Centre it was renamed Harrogate Convention Centre in April 2017. The centre has been described as being a "magnet for business conferences" and generates around £60 million per year into the local economy.

While Harrogate had been hosting conferences and exhibitions since the end of the Second World War, the 2,000-seat main auditorium opened in 1982 and was the host of the Eurovision Song Contest 1982. The venue has since expanded to include eight exhibition halls offering 180,000 square feet (17,000 m^{2}) of space as well as ancillary facilities including a hotel. Further expansion took place between 2009 and 2014.

The Royal Hall holds 1,000 people, whereas the Queen's Suite holds up to 600. The Royal Hall is grade II* listed building which is a former concert hall designed by Frank Matcham and Robert Beale.

The between April 2013 and December 2018, the director of the conference centre was Simon Kent. Since January 2019, the director is Paula Lorimer.

In April 2020, the centre was converted into NHS Nightingale Hospital Yorkshire and the Humber in response to the Coronavirus pandemic of 2020. The centre was furnished with 500 beds.

== Notable events ==
The Liberal Democrats have held the Liberal Democrat Federal Conference at the centre on six occasions since the party's formation in 1988.

The Green Party held their 2022 Autumn Conference at the centre.

The Eurovision Song Contest was held at the International Centre in 1982.

== See also ==
- List of venues in the United Kingdom

Preceded by RDS Simmonscourt Pavilion; Dublin	Eurovision Song Contest; Venue; 1982	Succeeded by Rudi-Sedlmayer-Halle; Munich
