= Sweden in the Eurovision Song Contest 1981 =

- Eurovision Song Contest 1981
- Participating broadcaster: Sveriges Television (SVT)
- Country: Sweden
- Selection process: Melodifestivalen 1981
- Selection date: 21 February 1981

Competing entry
- Song: "Fångad i en dröm"
- Artist: Björn Skifs
- Songwriters: Björn Skifs; Bengt Palmers

Placement
- Final result: 10th, 50 points

Participation chronology

Sweden was represented at the Eurovision Song Contest 1981 with the song Fångad i en dröm, written by Björn Skifs and Bengt Palmers, and performed by Skifs himself. The Swedish participating broadcaster, Sveriges Television (SVT), selected its entry through Melodifestivalen 1981. Skifs had previously represented Sweden in 1978.

== Before Eurovision ==
=== Melodifestivalen 1981 ===
Melodifestivalen 1981 was the selection for the 21st song to represent Sweden at the Eurovision Song Contest. It was the 20th time that this system of picking a song had been used. 90 songs were submitted to Sveriges Television (SVT) for the competition. The final was held in the Cirkus in Stockholm on 21 February 1981, presented by Janne Loffe Carlsson and was broadcast on TV1 but was not broadcast on radio. It was the second time that Lasse Holm and Kikki Danielsson had been beaten into second place by Björn Skifs, after 1978.

R/O	Artist	Song	Songwriters	Points	Place
1	Janne Lucas Persson	"Rocky Mountain"	Janne Lucas Persson; Göran Ledstedt	50	3
2	Anders Glenmark	"Det är mitt liv - det är jag"	Anders Glenmark	41	4
3	Kicki Moberg	"Men natten är vår"	Agnetha Fältskog; Ingela "Pling" Forsman	28	5
4	Björn Skifs	"Fångad i en dröm"	Björn Skifs; Bengt Palmers	59	1
5	Sweets 'n' Chips	"God morgon"	Lasse Holm; Torgny Söderberg	53	2

Voting
R/O	Song	Falun	Gothenburg	Karlstad	Luleå	Malmö	Norrköping	Sundsvall	Umeå	Växjö	Örebro	Stockholm	Total
1	"Rocky Mountain"	8	4	4	6	4	6	6	4	4	2	2	50
2	"Det är mitt liv - det är jag"	4	6	8	1	2	2	2	6	1	1	8	41
3	"Men natten är vår"	1	1	1	2	1	1	8	1	2	4	6	28
4	"Fångad i en dröm"	6	8	6	8	8	4	1	2	6	6	4	59
5	"God morgon"	2	2	2	4	6	8	4	8	8	8	1	53

== At Eurovision ==
At the contest, this year held in Dublin, Ireland, Sweden was drawn #20, at the very end of the start field. The song earned maximum points from France and 10 points from Germany, and finally ended up 10th with 50 points.

=== Voting ===
Points awarded to Sweden
Score	Country
12 points	France
10 points	Germany
8 points	
7 points	Yugoslavia
6 points	Norway
5 points	Denmark
4 points	Belgium
3 points	
2 points	Luxembourg; United Kingdom
1 point	Cyprus; Finland

Points awarded by Sweden
Score	Country
12 points	Germany
10 points	France
8 points	United Kingdom
7 points	Ireland
6 points	Finland
5 points	Luxembourg
4 points	Denmark
3 points	Israel
2 points	Austria
1 point	Switzerland
