= Belgium in the Eurovision Song Contest 1981 =

- Eurovision Song Contest 1981
- Participating broadcaster: Belgische Radio- en Televisieomroep (BRT)
- Country: Belgium
- Selection process: Eurosong 1981
- Selection date: 7 March 1981

Competing entry
- Song: "Samson"
- Artist: Emly Starr
- Songwriters: Kick Dandy; Giuseppe Marchese; Penny Els

Placement
- Final result: 13th, 40 points

Participation chronology

Belgium was represented at the Eurovision Song Contest 1981 with the song "Samson", written by Kick Dandy, Giuseppe Marchese, and Penny Els, and performed by Emly Starr. The Belgian participating broadcaster, Flemish Belgische Radio- en Televisieomroep (BRT), selected its entry through a national final.

== Before Eurovision ==
=== Internal selection ===
In 1980, Flemish broadcaster Belgische Radio- en Televisieomroep (BRT) asked Toots Thielemans to write and accompany a song for the Eurovision Song Contest 1981. The BRT had requested a song in the style of his 1963 hit "Bluesette" and had planned for Sofie Verbruggen to sing the song. However, Thielamans was too busy with studio work and other performances to be able to compose a song. The BRT instead decided to host another edition of Eurosong.

=== Eurosong 1981 ===
==== Format ====
Eurosong 1981 consisted of three semi-finals, followed by a final on 7 March 1981. Public voting for the semi-finals opened one day after the third heat, after a show was broadcast featuring one minute of all 36 competing songs. The top ten songs qualified to the final.

All the shows took place at the Amerikaans Theater in Brussels and were hosted by Luc Appermont. There was no live orchestra and all the music and some of the backing vocals had been pre-recorded. This led to the BRT receiving several complaints after the final, as many people believed that since the singing in the Eurovision Song Contest has to be live this should be reflected in the national final.

==== Competing entries ====
A jury of people from BRT and SABAM chose 40 songs out of 134 submissions. Four songs were then removed from the competition as they were invalid and did not meet all the rules of Eurosong 1981. Among the chosen songs were future and past Dutch and Belgian representative Stella Maessen (Netherlands 1970 as part of Hearts of Soul; Belgium 1977 as part of Dream Express; and Belgium 1982) and future Belgian representative Liliane Saint-Pierre (1987).

Artist	Song	Songwriter(s)
Ann Michel	"Ik ben gelukkig"	Gilbert Neilburt
Anne-Marie	"Twee is teveel"	Pol Kessels; Chris Bossers
Bea Cardon	"Elke traan"	Ronald Driesen
Cindy	"Ik ben verliefd"	Kick Dandy; Els Van den Abbeele
Claire	"Zonder jou"	Guido Desimpelaere
De Opera	"De opera"	Charles Dumolin; Greta Mestdagh
Della Bosiers	"Mij kan niets meer gebeuren"	Della Bosiers; Jaak Dreesen
Dorina	"Het ware geluk"	Gerda Chantraine
Emly Starr	"Samson en Delilah"	Kick Dandy; Els Van den Abbeele
Fancy Free	"De wereld is een showtoneel"	Roger Op 't Eynde; Hugo Van Diepenbeeck
Gene Summer	"Zing het maar"	Heinz Bzik
Jacky Lafon	"Dag meneer"	Paul Quintens; Phil Van Cauwenbergh
Jef Elbers	"Gummibal"	Jef Elbers
Jennifer	"In mijn armen"	Chris De Braekeleer; Pol Schoors
Jo Vally	"De wereld draait"	Luc Smets; Jo De Clercq
Johann Stollz	"Hello, Hello"	Rijosa, André Jean; Henk André
John Sates	"Topconditie"	Jan Staes
Johnny White	"Op dat kamertje voor ons twee"	Theo Scheveneels; Roland Serpierre
Karin Setter	"Er was een tijd"	Mary Loss; Bobby Setter
Kathy and Nancy	"Zaterdagavond"	Ghislain Slingeneyer
Lester and Denwood	"Bonnie"	Charles Dumolin; Roland Vanblaere
Liliane Saint-Pierre	"Brussel"	Sergio Popovski; Theo Vanhaeren
Lode de Ceuster	"Dit wijsje vond ik in jouw ogen"	Lode de Ceuster
Mark Manuel	"Marianne uit vroeger dagen"	Mark Uyttersprot
Mary Helena	"Liefde is..."	Will Tura; Johan Verminnen
Mary Scott	"Ik ga weg van jou"	Ghislain Slingeneyer
Mik Deboes	"Ik kom terug"	Mik Deboes
Nancy Dee	"Blij bij je te zijn"	Gus Roan; Mark Malyster
Patty Devick	"Daar waar liefde is"	Antoine Verheyen
Perte Totale	"Compagnie verliefd"	Wim De Craene
Peter En Zout	"Eens was het anders"	Luc De Smet; Peter Hens; Walter Buts
Ria Geraerts	"Dromen bouwen"	Ria Geraerts
Rick Heylen Group	"Vanavond en vannacht"	Jan Boonen; Frank Dingenen
Ronald	"Als men iemand zo bemint"	Ronald Driesen
Stella	"Veel te veel"	Luc Smets; Jo De Clercq
Venus	"Talisman"	Heidi Czajkowski; Rick Vervecken; Fred Beeckmans

==== Semi-finals ====
Three semi-finals were held with twelve songs in each, from which the top ten songs across the three semi-finals qualified to the final. The songs were not voted on at the time, but on the day after the third semi-final (1 March 1981) a recap of all 36 songs was broadcast and viewers were then invited to vote for ten of the songs. Voting took place by filling out and submitting a lottery-style form which cost 50 francs each. People were allowed to buy as many as they wanted and did not have to prove they had seen the semi-finals. Voters were not asked to vote for their ten favourite songs but the ten songs they believed would qualify. Prizes such as cars, holidays and home entertainment equipment were on offer to those who managed to forecast all ten qualifying songs correctly and out of the 184,052 lottery forms that were submitted, 36 successfully predicted the ten qualifying songs.

Semi-finals
R/O	Artist	Song	Result
Semi-final 1 – 14 February 1981
1	Della Bosiers	"Mij kan niets meer gebeuren"	—N/a
2	Ronald	"Als men iemand zo bemint"	—N/a
3	Jacky Lafon	"Dag meneer"	—N/a
4	Jef Elbers	"Gummibal"	—N/a
5	Fancy Free	"De wereld is een showtoneel"	Qualified
6	Jo Vally	"De wereld draait"	—N/a
7	Anne-Marie	"Twee is teveel"	—N/a
8	John Sates	"Topconditie"	—N/a
9	De Opera	"De opera"	Qualified
10	Gene Summer	"Zing het maar"	Qualified
11	Perte Totale	"Compagnie verliefd"	—N/a
12	Johnny White	"Op dat kamertje voor ons twee"	—N/a
Semi-final 2 – 21 February 1981
13	Jennifer	"In mijn armen"	—N/a
14	Rick Heylen Group	"Vanavond en vannacht"	—N/a
15	Stella	"Veel te veel"	Qualified
16	Dorina	"Het ware geluk"	—N/a
17	Patty Devick	"Daar waar liefde is"	—N/a
18	Cindy	"Ik ben verliefd"	—N/a
19	Mary Helena	"Liefde is..."	—N/a
20	Bea Cardon	"Elke traan"	—N/a
21	Peter En Zout	"Eens was het anders"	—N/a
22	Ria Geraerts	"Dromen bouwen"	—N/a
23	Ann Michel	"Ik ben gelukkig"	Qualified
24	Claire	"Zonder jou"	—N/a
Semi-final 3 – 28 February 1981
25	Johann Stollz	"Hello, Hello"	Qualified
26	Nancy Dee	"Blij bij je te zijn"	—N/a
27	Mary Scott	"Ik ga weg van jou"	—N/a
28	Mark Manuel	"Marianne uit vroeger dagen"	—N/a
29	Kathy and Nancy	"Zaterdagavond"	—N/a
30	Emly Starr	"Samson en Delilah"	Qualified
31	Lester and Denwood	"Bonnie"	Qualified
32	Lode de Ceuster	"Dit wijsje vond ik in jouw ogen"	—N/a
33	Mik Deboes	"Ik kom terug"	—N/a
34	Venus	"Talisman"	Qualified
35	Liliane Saint-Pierre	"Brussel"	Qualified
36	Karin Setter	"Er was een tijd"	—N/a

==== Final ====
The final was held on 7 March 1981 and before the first song was performed, Jo Van Backlé announced the numbers of the winning lottery forms and announced the prizes. The results were decided by a 7-member jury. The members of the jury were: chairman Nest Van der Eyken, Johnny Steggerda, Jef Van den Berg, Pieter Verlinden, Gaston Nuyts, Claude Blondeel, and Bob Boon. Only the winner was announced, but it was rumoured and later confirmed in an interview in 2020 with one of the jury members, Claude Blondeel, that Liliane Saint-Pierre came second.

Final – 7 March 1981
R/O	Artist	Song	Place
1	Fancy Free	"De wereld is een showtoneel"	—N/a
2	De Opera	"De opera"	—N/a
3	Gene Summer	"Zing het maar"	—N/a
4	Stella	"Veel te veel"	—N/a
5	Ann Michel	"Ik ben gelukkig"	—N/a
6	Johann Stollz	"Hello, Hello"	—N/a
7	Emly Starr	"Samson en Delilah"	1
8	Lester and Denwood	"Bonnie"	—N/a
9	Venus	"Talisman"	—N/a
10	Liliane Saint-Pierre	"Brussel"	2

== At Eurovision ==
Prior to the contest, the song title was shortened to "Samson". On the night of the final Starr performed 16th in the running order, following Portugal and preceding Greece. At the close of the voting "Samson" had received 40 points (the highest being 8 from Yugoslavia), placing Belgium 13th of the 20 entries. The Belgian jury awarded its 12 points to Denmark.

=== Voting ===
Points awarded to Belgium
Score	Country
12 points	
10 points	
8 points	Yugoslavia
7 points	Greece; Turkey
6 points	Denmark
5 points	Cyprus
4 points	
3 points	United Kingdom
2 points	Finland
1 point	Austria; Israel

Points awarded by Belgium
Score	Country
12 points	Denmark
10 points	Germany
8 points	United Kingdom
7 points	Cyprus
6 points	Greece
5 points	Yugoslavia
4 points	Sweden
3 points	France
2 points	Netherlands
1 point	Ireland
