= Tramteatret =

Norwegian theatrical and musical group

Tramteatret was a Norwegian left-oriented theatre performance group active from 1976 to 1986.

The group included the members Marianne Krogness, Liv Aakvik, Terje Nordby, Kine Hellebust and others. Their first production was the satirical Deep sea thriller, with references to the Bravo accident in April 1977, the largest oil blowout on the Norwegian shelf. They made a number of productions for the Norwegian Broadcasting Corporation, including Serum serum from 1980, Pelle Parafin og automatspøkelsene (1981), and Hemmelighetene i B-by (1982). The group produced a total of eight musical revues, and several musical albums. Albums include Deep Sea Thriller.. Og Enda Mer.. from 1977, Tramfart from 1978, Back To The '80's from 1980, Pelle Parafins Bøljeband from 1981, Tramteatret from 1982, B-Bylivet Går Sin Gang from 1982, Det Går Alltid Et Korstog from 1983, Drömmen Om Elin from 1985, and Randi og Ronnis Restaurant from 1986.

In 1981 the group appeared in Melodi Grand Prix, the televised competition to represent Norway in that year's Eurovision Song Contest, finishing fourth with the song "Det er vår tur nå".
