= The Duskeys =

Irish musical group

- Also known as: The Duskey Sisters
- Origin: Ireland, Wales
- Genre: Pop music
- Years active: 1980 - 83
- Members: Sandy Kelly; Barbara Ellis; Nina Duskey; Dan Duskey

The Duskeys was an Irish family pop group, known for their participation in the Eurovision Song Contest 1982 with the song "Here Today Gone Tomorrow".

== Background ==
Formed after the break-up of Sandy Kelly's (real name Philomena Ellis) touring showband The Fairways, she recruited her sister Barbara Ellis and Welsh cousin Nina Duskey. In 1980, they released their debut single, "Don't Feel Like Dancing". In 1981 they competed in the Irish national finals for the Eurovision Song Contest 1981 with the song "Where Does That Love Come From" under the name The Duskey Sisters. They finished in third place.

A year later, they tried again and recruited a male member, Nina's brother, Dan Duskey. They performed the song "Here Today Gone Tomorrow" and this time, won the contest. This earned themselves a place in the Eurovision Song Contest 1982 and with 49 points, they came in eleventh position. The song was heavily reworked for its single release and became a hit on the Irish charts, reaching No.12.

The group followed this up with the singles "Our Love is Slippin' Away" and "We Got Love" and they toured Ireland for the next two years. In late 1983, the group were involved in a road accident while on tour which effectively ended the group.

The following year, Sandy Kelly launched a successful solo career, scoring a number of hits on the Irish charts, including two singles she recorded with Johnny Cash. She continues to tour under this name (Kelly is her married name), largely focusing on country music.

As Michael Palace, Dan Duskey later fronted the group Palace that finished 5th in the 1986 A Song For Europe contest in the UK with the song "Dancing With You Again". Dan Duskey is now a pastor in the Elim Pentecostal Church, Bristol, under the name Simon Foster.

Awards and achievements
Preceded by Sheeba with "Horoscopes"	Ireland in the Eurovision Song Contest; 1982	Succeeded by Linda Martin with "Terminal 3"
