= Jean Gabilou =

- Also known as: Gabilou
- Born: Gabriel Lewis Laughlin; 28 February 1944 (age 82); Papeete, Tahiti, French Polynesia, France
- Origin: French Polynesia
- Occupation: Musician

Jean Gabilou (born Gabriel Lewis Laughlin on 28 February 1944) is a Tahiti based singer who represented France in the Eurovision Song Contest 1981.

== Early life ==
Born into a family of ten children, he grew up in Papeete, Tahiti until the age of 13, before moving to Faa'a with his family. He is of Polynesian descent.

In 1963, a friend, Raoul Robert, asked him to sing a melody at the Matavai Hotel. He then interpreted two waltzes and the religious song "When The Saints Go Marching In" in rock version. The same evening he received his first contract, for 60 francs an hour. He first worked with the Vernaudon brothers for two years, then started performing at the Pitate Club with the Hars Brothers for another two years. Laughlin was then approached by Petiot, a guitarist for a group called The Barefoot Boys, which he joined at the age of 23. However, in 1968, Laughlin left the group.

== Career ==
Following his departure from the Barefoot Boys, Laughlin founded the Banjo Boys, a group formed with his friends Kitty Salmon, Jacky Bougues, Marius Charles and Michael Garcia. Their song "Little Sacred Island" was released in 1968 and sold 54,000 copies.

In 1971, he sang at the hotel Tahara'a and was noticed by a lady named Paulette Vienot who, during that year, gets Laughlin signed for a contract in Paris with Eddie Barclay compiling the song "Moi girls". Which did not meet the expected success that was hoped.

In 1979, he moved to the United States. Two years later, he was contacted to represent France in the Eurovision Song Contest 1981 with the song "Humanahum". He finished third with 125 points, seven points behind Germany's Lena Valaitis and eleven points behind the United Kingdom's Bucks Fizz, who won the contest.

In 1983, he celebrated his twenty-year career in Papeete. In 1985, he married Moeata Sasson, an accomplished dancer for the Tahitian dance troupe "Tamari'i Fautaua. A few years later, Moeata staged her own dance troupe "Tamari'i Poerava", whose dancers then began performing alongside Gabilou. In early 2018, he recorded the song "Source de ma vie" ("Source of My Life".) in a duet with New Caledonian singer Claudia Haustien.

== Later life ==
In 1993 he returned on stage with "Hei No". However, in 1995, feeling ill, Gabilou went to a medical clinic in Papeete where he was diagnosed with having paralyzed vocal cords. Despite the bad news, he fought to regain his voice and left for France where he met speech therapist Dr Veil. After attending numerous rehabilitation sessions he regained his voice and released the album "Rohipehe"

In 2000 Gabilou decided to produce his own songs together with his friend and singer Andy Tupaia. Along with John Marote Mariassouce, the song "Fakateretere" featured on the album with the same name, was produced. It sold 20,000 copies and continues to be recognised throughout the Pacific as his signature song.

Gabilou continues to perform on stage. In 2001 and 2002 he was invited to Rarotonga, Cook Islands where he had also lived previously, to sing in front of 3500 people.

In 2003 he performed at the Oscars of Polynesian music. On 8 June 2013 he celebrated his 50th year in the industry with a concert in Pape'ete's House of Culture.

== Discography ==
- 2007 - Le Fafaru
- 2006 - Avini Ute
- 2005 - Homai-Heiatea
- 2004- Keanu
- 2003 - Poerava
- 2001 - Fakateretere
- 1999 - Barefoot, en souvenir de Joe Garbutt
- 1997 - Rohipehe
- 1996 - Na oe Vairea
- 1994 - Mama Ella
- 1992 - Hei No Tamatoa
- 1990 - Nohoarii
- 1989 - Hianau
- 1988 - Esther et Gabilou, leurs plus grands succès

Preceded by Profil withHè Hé M'sieurs dames	France in the Eurovision Song Contest; 1981	Succeeded by Guy Bonnet withVivre
