= Denmark in the Eurovision Song Contest 1981 =

- Eurovision Song Contest 1981
- Participating broadcaster: Danmarks Radio (DR)
- Country: Denmark
- Selection process: Dansk Melodi Grand Prix 1981
- Selection date: 28 February 1981

Competing entry
- Song: "Krøller eller ej"
- Artist: Debbie Cameron and Tommy Seebach
- Songwriters: Tommy Seebach; Keld Heick

Placement
- Final result: 11th, 41 points

Participation chronology

Denmark was represented at the Eurovision Song Contest 1981 with the song "Krøller eller ej", composed by Tommy Seebach, with lyrics by Keld Heick, and performed by Debbie Cameron and Tommy Seebach. The Danish participating broadcaster, Danmarks Radio (DR), organised the Dansk Melodi Grand Prix 1981 in order to select its entry for the contest. Seebach had previously represented Denmark in 1979, when Cameron was one of his backing singers.

== Before Eurovision ==
=== Dansk Melodi Grand Prix 1981 ===
Danmarks Radio (DR) held the Dansk Melodi Grand Prix 1981 on 28 February at the Valencia-Varieteen in Copenhagen, hosted by Jørgen de Mylius. Five songs took part with the winner being decided by a jury made up of members of the public.

Final – 28 February 1981
R/O	Artist	Song	Points	Place
1	Hans Mosters Vovse	"King Kong Boogie"	375	2
2	Anniqa	"Sikken dejlig dame"	359	3
3	Tommy Seebach and Debbie Cameron	"Krøller eller ej"	441	1
4	Theis Jensen	"Satchmo"	210	5
5	Carsten Elmer and Jørgen Klubien	"En tragisk komedie"	283	4

== At Eurovision ==
On the night of the final Seebach and Cameron performed 6th in the running order, following Israel and preceding Yugoslavia. At the close of voting "Krøller eller ej" had received 41 points, placing Denmark 11th of the 20 entries. The Danish jury awarded its 12 points to the host nation Ireland.

The contest was broadcast on DR TV, with commentary by Jørgen de Mylius.

=== Voting ===
Points awarded to Denmark
Score	Country
12 points	Belgium
10 points	
8 points	
7 points	Luxembourg
6 points	
5 points	United Kingdom
4 points	France; Sweden
3 points	Spain
2 points	Netherlands; Portugal
1 point	Germany; Turkey

Points awarded by Denmark
Score	Country
12 points	Ireland
10 points	United Kingdom
8 points	Germany
7 points	Netherlands
6 points	Belgium
5 points	Sweden
4 points	Switzerland
3 points	Cyprus
2 points	France
1 point	Austria
