= Norway in the Eurovision Song Contest 1981 =

- Eurovision Song Contest 1981
- Participating broadcaster: Norsk rikskringkasting (NRK)
- Country: Norway
- Selection process: Melodi Grand Prix 1981
- Selection date: 7 March 1981

Competing entry
- Song: "Aldri i livet"
- Artist: Finn Kalvik
- Songwriters: Finn Kalvik

Placement
- Final result: 20th, 0 points

Participation chronology

Norway was represented at the Eurovision Song Contest 1981 with the song "Aldri i livet", written and performed by Finn Kalvik. The Norwegian participating broadcaster, Norsk rikskringkasting (NRK), selected its entry through the Melodi Grand Prix 1981.

== Before Eurovision ==
=== Melodi Grand Prix 1981 ===
Norsk rikskringkasting (NRK) held the Melodi Grand Prix 1981 at its studios in Oslo, hosted by Sverre Kjelsberg who represented Norway in 1980. Ten songs took part in the final, with the winner chosen by a 9-member jury who awarded 10 points to their favourite song down to 1 point to the least-like; two members of the jury were Ellen Nikolaysen, who represented Norway in 1973 (as a member of the Bendik Singers) and 1975, and Anita Skorgan, who represented Norway in 1979.

Final – 7 March 1981
R/O	Artist	Song	Points	Place
1	Alex	"Rock'n Roller"	52	5
2	Unit 5	"Lei mæ hjem"	64	2
3	Dollie	"1984"	49	6
4	Berit Nyheim	"Rock'n Roll"	19	10
5	Inger Lise Rypdal	"Tanker"	63	3
6	Eigil Berg	"Lorelei"	35	9
7	Halvdan Sivertsen	"Liv laga"	39	7
8	Darlings	"Født på ny"	36	8
9	Tramteatret	"Det er vår tur nå"	59	4
10	Finn Kalvik	"Aldri i livet"	79	1

Detailed Jury Votes
R/O	Song	Åsmund Feidje	Turid Pedersen	Halvard Kausland	Bjørn Kruse	Ellen Nikolaysen	Sigurd Jansen	Kari Svendsen	Anita Skorgan	Bjørn Jacobsen	Total
1	"Rock'n Roller"	4	3	5	7	9	5	4	7	8	52
2	"Lei mæ hjem"	8	9	2	8	10	6	9	9	3	64
3	"1984"	3	5	8	3	3	4	6	8	9	49
4	"Rock'n Roll"	5	1	4	2	1	1	1	2	2	19
5	"Tankar"	7	6	10	10	8	7	7	3	5	63
6	"Lorelei"	1	2	3	1	6	2	8	6	6	35
7	"Liv laga"	6	8	1	6	5	3	2	4	4	39
8	"Født på ny"	2	4	9	5	2	9	3	1	1	36
9	"Det er vår tur nå"	10	7	7	4	4	10	5	5	7	59
10	"Aldri i livet"	9	10	6	9	7	8	10	10	10	79

== At Eurovision ==
On the night of the final Kalvik performed 13th in the running order, following Ireland and preceding the United Kingdom – in one of Eurovision's stranger coincidences, this was to be the first of six consecutive contests in which Norway was drawn to perform immediately before the United Kingdom. At the close of voting "Aldri i livet" had failed register any score, giving Norway a second nul-points in four contests and a sixth time at the foot of the scoreboard. The Norwegian jury awarded its 12 points to Switzerland.

=== Voting ===
Norway did not receive any points at the Eurovision Song Contest 1981.

Points awarded by Norway
Score	Country
12 points	Switzerland
10 points	Spain
8 points	Israel
7 points	Cyprus
6 points	Sweden
5 points	France
4 points	Germany
3 points	United Kingdom
2 points	Greece
1 point	Yugoslavia
