= United Kingdom in the Eurovision Song Contest 1981 =

- Eurovision Song Contest 1981
- Participating broadcaster: British Broadcasting Corporation (BBC)
- Country: United Kingdom
- Selection process: A Song for Europe 1981
- Selection date: 11 March 1981

Competing entry
- Song: "Making Your Mind Up"
- Artist: Bucks Fizz
- Songwriters: Andy Hill; John Danter

Placement
- Final result: 1st, 136 points

Participation chronology

The United Kingdom was represented at the Eurovision Song Contest 1981 with the song "Making Your Mind Up", composed by John Danter, with lyrics by Andy Hill, and performed by Bucks Fizz. The British participating broadcaster, the British Broadcasting Corporation (BBC), selected its entry through a national final titled A Song for Europe 1981. The entry eventually won the Eurovision Song Contest.

== Before Eurovision ==
=== A Song for Europe 1981 ===
The British Broadcasting Corporation (BBC) reduced the number of finalists from twelve to eight in 1981. Terry Wogan hosted the national final on 11 March at the BBC Television Theatre in London. 581 songs were submitted to the Music Publisher's Association to pick eight songs. The BBC Concert Orchestra under the direction of John Coleman as conductor accompanied all the songs, but all the music was pre-recorded. The show was the 16th most watched programme of the week with a rating of 12.4 million viewers, the highest for three years. Johnny Logan was scheduled to appear as a guest on the programme, but had to cancel shortly before the air date.

Seven regional juries voted on the songs. The regional juries voted internally and awarded 15 points to their favourite song, 12 points to the second, 10 points to the third and then 9, 8, 7, 6 and 5 points in order of preference for the songs from 4th to 8th. Before the reprise, Terry Wogan incorrectly read the title of the winning song as "Where Are You Now". The prizes were presented by Wogan to John Danter, one of the songwriters, and to Mike Nolan, one of the performers.

A Song for Europe 1981 – 11 March 1981
R/O	Artist	Song	Songwriter(s)	Points	Place
1	Headache	"Not Without Your Ticket (Don't Go)"	Luís Jardim; Jean Gilbert	50	7
2	Gary Benson	"All Cried Out"	Gary Benson	63	4
3	Unity	"For Only a Day"	John Dawson Read; Christopher Gunning	38	8
4	Beyond	"Wish"	Steve Elson; Don Gould	67	3
5	Bucks Fizz	"Making Your Mind Up"	Andy Hill; John Danter	97	1
6	Gem	"Have You Ever Been in Love?"	Andy Hill; Peter Sinfield; John Danter	63	4
7	Lezlee Carling	"Where Are You Now"	Lindsey Moore	56	6
8	Liquid Gold	"Don't Panic"	Adrian Baker	70	2

Regional jury votes
R/O	Song	Birmingham	Cardiff	Manchester	Belfast	Edinburgh	London	Bristol	Total
1	"Not Without Your Ticket"	7	5	10	10	6	5	7	50
2	"All Cried Out"	12	8	8	8	8	10	9	63
3	"For Only a Day"	5	6	5	6	5	6	5	38
4	"Wish"	15	9	6	9	12	8	8	67
5	"Making Your Mind Up"	10	15	15	15	15	15	12	97
6	"Have You Ever Been in Love"	8	10	7	12	7	9	10	63
7	"Where Are You Now"	6	12	9	7	9	7	6	56
8	"Don't Panic"	9	7	12	5	10	12	15	70
Regional jury spokespersons
Birmingham – David Stevens; Cardiff – Iwan Thomas; Manchester – John Mundy; Belfast – Peter Dickson; Edinburgh – Jim O'Hara; London – Ray Moore; Bristol – Andy Batten-Foster

== At Eurovision ==
"Making Your Mind Up" performed by Bucks Fizz won the Eurovision Song Contest 1981. It received 136 points from the 19 juries, beating Germany's "Johnny Blue" by Lena Valaitis.

Members of the British jury included Norman Harper, S. Andrew, David Bratt, P. Green, A. Harmann, J.P. Robinson, D. Ruteledge, S. Tapper, I. Tyler, G. Wallbank, and Conor E. Young.

=== Voting ===
Points awarded to the United Kingdom
Score	Country
12 points	Israel; Netherlands
10 points	Denmark; Ireland; Yugoslavia
8 points	Belgium; Spain; Sweden; Switzerland; Turkey
7 points	France
6 points	Greece; Portugal
5 points	Luxembourg
4 points	Austria; Cyprus; Germany
3 points	Finland; Norway
2 points	
1 point	

Points awarded by the United Kingdom
Score	Country
12 points	Switzerland
10 points	Cyprus
8 points	Greece
7 points	Germany
6 points	Netherlands
5 points	Denmark
4 points	Israel
3 points	Belgium
2 points	Sweden
1 point	France
