= Debbie Cameron =

American singer (born 1958)

- Born: Deborah Cameron; September 14, 1958 (age 67); Miami, Florida, United States
- Occupation: Singer
- Years active: 1976–present

Deborah (Debbie) Cameron (born September 14, 1958) is a Danish-American singer of Bahamian descent who has had a career in music in Denmark.

Cameron was born in Miami, Florida. Her career started in 1976, when she was awarded the prize "Most promising student" at the Music School at the University of Miami. In 1978, she went to Copenhagen, where her mother Etta already lived. In 1979 she was a prominent backing singer for Tommy Seebach at his participating for Denmark in the Eurovision Song Contest 1979 with the song "Disco Tango". She again represented Denmark in the Eurovision Song Contest 1981, duetting with Tommy Seebach. They performed the song "Krøller eller ej" (Curls or not), finishing 11th with 41 points.

== Discography ==
=== LPs ===
- Debbie Cameron
- New York Date
- Be With Me
- Brief Encounter, duet, with Richard Boone
- Debbie Cameron
- Maybe We, with the band Buki Yamaz

=== Singles ===
- "Greenback Dollar" / "I Don`t Wanna See You Cry"
- "Call Me Tonight"
- "Game of My Life"
- "You To Me Are Everything"
- "Glad That's It's Over"
- "So-Le-La"
- "Accepted By Society"
- "Krøller eller ej", (Curls or not) duet with Tommy Seebach
- "Jeg en gård mig bygge vil" (I want to build a Farm)
- "I See the Moon" (AUS #72)
- "Stuck On You"
- "Copenhagen"
- "Sideshow"
- "Boogie Woogie Rendez-Vous"

=== Valentinos ===
- Disco Dance Party

Vocals: Debbie Cameron, Sanne Salomonsen & Michael Elo

=== Soundtrack ===
Soundtrack of the film Den Eneste Ene (The One and Only)

== Filmography ==
She has participated in the Danish film Hodja fra Pjort (Hodja from Pjort) in 1985. She also played herself in the Norwegian film De blå ulvene (The blue wolves) in 1993.

Preceded by Bamses Venner with Tænker altid på dig	Denmark in the Eurovision Song Contest; 1981	Succeeded by Brixx with Video, Video
