= Kine Hellebust =

Norwegian singer, actress, children's writer, non-fiction writer and playwright

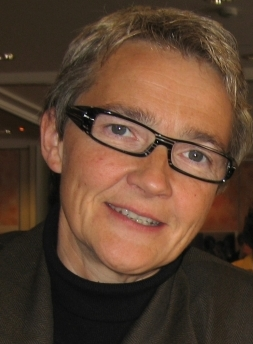
- Born: 15 December 1954 (age 71); Harstad, Norway
- Education: University of Tromsø
- Occupations: Singer; Actress; Writer

Kine Hellebust (born 15 December 1954 in Harstad) is a Norwegian singer, actress, children's writer, non-fiction writer and playwright.

== Career ==
Born in Harstad on 15 December 1954, Hellebust studied drama at Sund folk high school, and studied writing at the University of Tromsø.

Hellebust was assigned with the Hålogaland Teater from 1976 to 1977, and again from 1984 to 1987. From 1978 to 1984 she was member of the performance group Tramteatret, where she participated in four television series, five plays and six music albums. She was a co-founder of Dameteater & søn in 1989. She has written the children's books Ho Anne og den forsvunne nøkkelen (1998) and Ho Kirsti og eg (2005). Among her plays is Kjære Bambino (staged in 2009). From 2001 to 2009 she was a member of the Norwegian Broadcasting Council.
