= Spain in the Eurovision Song Contest 1981 =

- Eurovision Song Contest 1981
- Participating broadcaster: Televisión Española (TVE)
- Country: Spain
- Selection process: Internal selection
- Announcement date: Artist: 17 February 1981; Song: 8 March 1981

Competing entry
- Song: "Y sólo tú"
- Artist: Bacchelli
- Songwriter: Amado Jaén

Placement
- Final result: 14th, 38 points

Participation chronology

Spain was represented at the Eurovision Song Contest 1981 with the song "Y sólo tú", written by Amado Jaén, and performed by Bacchelli. The Spanish participating broadcaster, Televisión Española (TVE), internally selected its entry for the contest. The song, performed in position 10, placed fourteenth out of twenty competing entries with 38 points.

== Before Eurovision ==
Televisión Española (TVE) internally selected "Y sólo tú" performed by Bacchelli as its entry for the Eurovision Song Contest 1981. The song was written by Amado Jaén. The broadcaster announced the name of the song, the songwriter, and performer on 17 February 1981. The song was presented on 8 March.

== At Eurovision ==
On 4 April 1981, the Eurovision Song Contest was held at the RDS Simmonscourt in Dublin hosted by Radio Telefís Éireann (RTÉ) and broadcast live throughout the continent. Bacchelli performed "Y sólo tú" 10th on the evening, following France and preceding the Netherlands. Joan Barcons conducted the event's orchestra performance of the Spanish entry. At the close of voting "Y sólo tú" had received 38 points, placing 14th in a field of 20.

TVE broadcast the contest in Spain on TVE 1 with commentary by Miguel de los Santos. Before the event, TVE aired a talk show hosted by Isabel Tenaille introducing the Spanish jury, which continued after the contest commenting on the results.

=== Voting ===
TVE assembled a jury panel with eleven members. The following members comprised the Spanish jury:

- Belén Lage – saleswoman
- José Manuel Lozano – sales director
- Carmen Ruiz – housewife
- Pablo Hardy – hairdresser
- María Acacia López-Bachiller – public relations
- Andrés Pajares – actor
- Lola Forner – Miss Spain 1979
- Juan Carlos Andrade – tennis player
- María del Mar Serrano – student
- Juan Vinader Pérez – sound engineer
- Amada Quintana – student

The jury was chaired by Alfonso Lapeña, with Francisco Hortelano as secretary, and Isabel Tenaille as spokesperson. Francisco Javier Alfaro was the notary public. These did not have the right to vote, but the president decided in the event of a tie. The jury awarded its maximum of 12 points to Germany.

Points awarded to Spain
| Score | Country |
|---|---|
| 12 points | |
| 10 points | Norway; Turkey |
| 8 points | |
| 7 points | |
| 6 points | Israel |
| 5 points | |
| 4 points | Netherlands |
| 3 points | Ireland; Portugal |
| 2 points | Switzerland |
| 1 point | |

Points awarded by Spain
| Score | Country |
|---|---|
| 12 points | Germany |
| 10 points | Greece |
| 8 points | United Kingdom |
| 7 points | Netherlands |
| 6 points | Austria |
| 5 points | Ireland |
| 4 points | Switzerland |
| 3 points | Denmark |
| 2 points | Finland |
| 1 point | Luxembourg |
