= Germany in the Eurovision Song Contest 1981 =

- Eurovision Song Contest 1981
- Participating broadcaster: ARD (Note: Arbeitsgemeinschaft der öffentlich-rechtlichen Rundfunkanstalten der Bundesrepublik Deutschland) – Bayerischer Rundfunk (BR)
- Country: Germany
- Selection process: Ein Lied für Dublin
- Selection date: 28 February 1981

Competing entry
- Song: "Johnny Blue"
- Artist: Lena Valaitis
- Songwriters: Ralph Siegel; Bernd Meinunger

Placement
- Final result: 2nd, 132 points

Participation chronology

Germany was represented at the Eurovision Song Contest 1981 with the song "Johnny Blue", composed by Ralph Siegel, with lyrics by Bernd Meinunger, and performed by Lena Valaitis. The German participating broadcaster on behalf of ARD, Bayerischer Rundfunk (BR), selected their entry through a national final. Valaitis had previously taken part in the German final in 1976.

== Before Eurovision ==
=== Ein Lied für Dublin ===
Bayerischer Rundfunk (BR) held the national final at its television studios in Munich, hosted by Katja Ebstein who represented Germany in 1980. 12 songs took part and the winner was chosen by a panel of approximately 500 people who had been selected as providing a representative cross-section of the German public.

| R/O | Artist | Song | Songwriters | Votes | Place |
|---|---|---|---|---|---|
| 1 | Janz | "Steine" | Paul Janz; Michael Kunze | 2,355 | 10 |
| 2 | Nina Martin | "Männer" | Nina Martinique | 2,292 | 11 |
| 3 | Taco | "Träume brauchen Zeit" | Janine Terlohian; Kathrin Brigl | 2,269 | 12 |
| 4 | Lenz Hauser | "Moment" | Harald Stümpfl; Lenz Hauser | 2,856 | 8 |
| 5 | Thomas Fuchsberger | "Josephine" | Thomas Fuchsberger; Joachim Fuchsberger | 2,956 | 7 |
| 6 | Rudolf Rock and Die Schocker | "Mein Transistorradio" | Michael Cretu; Michael Kunze | 2,735 | 9 |
| 7 | Lena Valaitis | "Johnny Blue" | Ralph Siegel; Bernd Meinunger | 5,023 | 1 |
| 8 | Martin Mann | "Boogie Woogie" | Rudi Bauer; Gerd Thumser | 4,039 | 3 |
| 9 | Jürgen Renfordt | "Barfuß durch ein Feuer" | Walter Gerke; Mick Hannes | 3,963 | 4 |
| 10 | Leinemann | "Das Ungeheuer von Loch Ness" | Ulf Krüger; Jörn-Christoph Seelenmeyer | 3,921 | 5 |
| 11 | The Hornettes | "Mannequin" | Ralph Siegel; Bernd Meinunger | 4,304 | 2 |
| 12 | Peter Cornelius | "Träumer, Tramps und Clowns" | Michael Cretu; Michael Kunze | 3,769 | 6 |

== At Eurovision ==
On the evening of the final Valaitis performed 3rd in the running order, following Turkey and preceding Luxembourg. Germany finished runners-up for the second year in succession with 132 points. The German jury awarded its 12 points to France.

The show was watched by 10.14 million viewers in Germany.

=== Voting ===
Points awarded to Germany
| Score | Country |
|---|---|
| 12 points | Portugal; Spain; Sweden; Turkey |
| 10 points | Belgium |
| 8 points | Cyprus; Denmark; France; Israel |
| 7 points | Finland; United Kingdom |
| 6 points | Ireland |
| 5 points | Austria; Greece |
| 4 points | Norway |
| 3 points | Luxembourg; Netherlands |
| 2 points | Yugoslavia |
| 1 point | |

Points awarded by Germany
| Score | Country |
|---|---|
| 12 points | France |
| 10 points | Sweden |
| 8 points | Portugal |
| 7 points | Switzerland |
| 6 points | Ireland |
| 5 points | Luxembourg |
| 4 points | United Kingdom |
| 3 points | Netherlands |
| 2 points | Greece |
| 1 point | Denmark |
