= Marty Brem =

Austrian-born singer, record executive and entrepreneur

Marty Brem

Martin Brem (born 23 April 1959), also known by his stage name Marty Brem, is an Austrian-born former singer, record executive and entrepreneur currently active in Salzburg and Los Angeles. He is known to wider audiences for his participation in the Eurovision Song Contest, representing Austria in 1980 as a member of the band Blue Danube and as a soloist in 1981, singing "Wenn du da bist" amidst somewhat unusual choreography performed by female dancers in an equally unusual selection of costumes.

After Brem's Eurovision exploits, he undertook various musical ventures, which included new wave and punk music. Brem also became a music journalist, and joined Philip Morris as a marketing consultant 1988, only to return to the music industry in 1992 as marketing director for Phonogram/Universal. In 1995 Brem became Vice President International Marketing for Sony Music Entertainment Europe in London, and in 1997 he took helm at Columbia Records in Berlin. Since 2012, Brem has been Head of Audio Portfolio for Red Bull Media House in Salzburg.

Brem's wife Ursula died in 2001, leaving him with two sons, at that time 9 and 11 years old. Inspired by his wife's hobby of collecting kimonos and a massive collection thereof, he started Sai So, a fashion boutique offering various parts of apparel, as well as other items, made of vintage kimono fabric. He now also heads the Berlin office of the German portal utopia.de.
