= Bacchelli (singer) =

Spanish singer

- Born: José María Bacchelli Ortega; 10 September 1952 (age 73); Barcelona, Spain
- Genres: Pop
- Occupations: Singer, actor
- Years active: 1970s–1990s

José María Bacchelli Ortega (born 10 September 1952 in Barcelona), known professionally as Bacchelli, is a Spanish singer who is best known for his participation in the 1981 Eurovision Song Contest.

Son of Spanish mother and Italian father, Bacchelli began his music career participating at the Benidorm Song Festival in 1977. In 1979, he released the single "Bacchelli". In 1980 he released the album Y sólo tú, which included the same-titled song. In 1981, he was chosen internally by broadcaster Televisión Española as the Spanish representative for the 26th Eurovision Song Contest with the song "Y sólo tú" ("And Only You"). The contest was held on 4 April in Dublin, where "Y sólo tú" could only manage 14th place of the 20 entries.

Later in 1981, he released a second album, Prohibido. In 1982, he released the LP Culpable. Bacchelli was unable to further capitalise on his Eurovision appearance and he did not release new records in Spain.

In 1988, Bacchelli released the LP Vida mía in Ecuador with record label Fediscos. In the early 1990s, he settled in Guayaquil, Ecuador. In 1992, he worked as an actor in Ecuadorian telenovela Isabela, on Ecuavisa; additionally he was the performer of the theme song of the serial, "Seguramente tú". Since then, he worked as an artist manager.

Awards and achievements
| Preceded by Trigo Limpio with "Quédate esta noche" | Spain in the Eurovision Song Contest; 1981 | Succeeded by Lucía with "Él" |
