= Marianne Krogness =

Norwegian actress, singer and revue artist

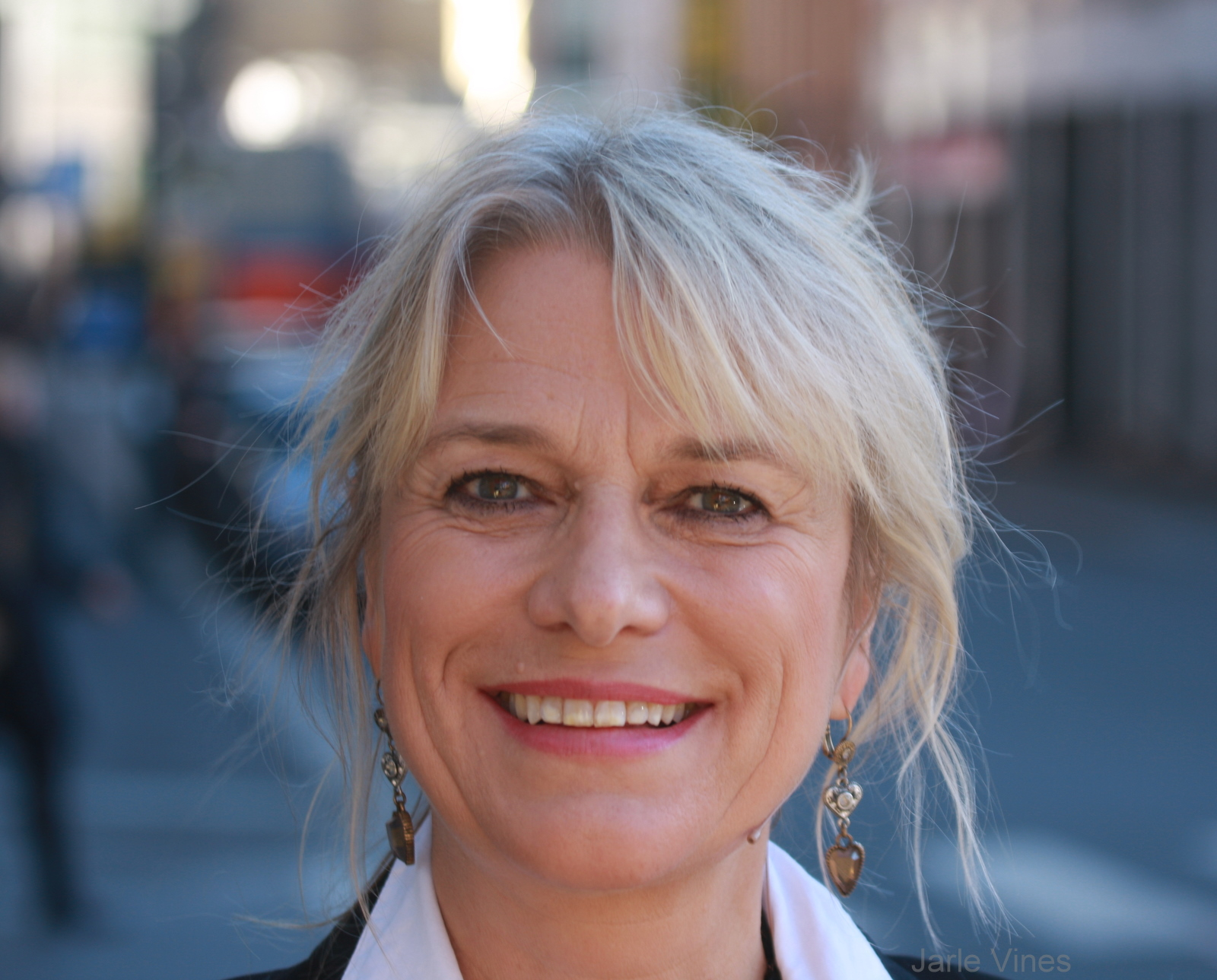
- Born: Marianne Krogness; November 3, 1951 (age 74)
- Occupations: Actress, singer
- Years active: 1976 – present

Marianne Krogness (born 3 November 1951) is a Norwegian actress, singer and revue artist. While a student at the University of Oslo, she joined the musical- and theatre group Tramteateret in 1976. Krogness has had several roles in television and on film, such as the 1985 drama Adjø solidaritet and the 1996–97 sitcom Bot og bedring. She has also been associated with a series of commercials she did for Shell gas stations.

== Select filmography ==
Year	Title	Role
1980	Serum serum (TV)	Sandra Salamander
1982	Pelle Parafins Bøljeband og automatspøkelsene (TV)	Sandra Salamander
1985	Adjø solidaritet	Sidsel
1996–97	"Bot og bedring" (TV)	Aase
2002	Folk flest bor i Kina	Tuva
