= Emly Starr =

Belgian singer

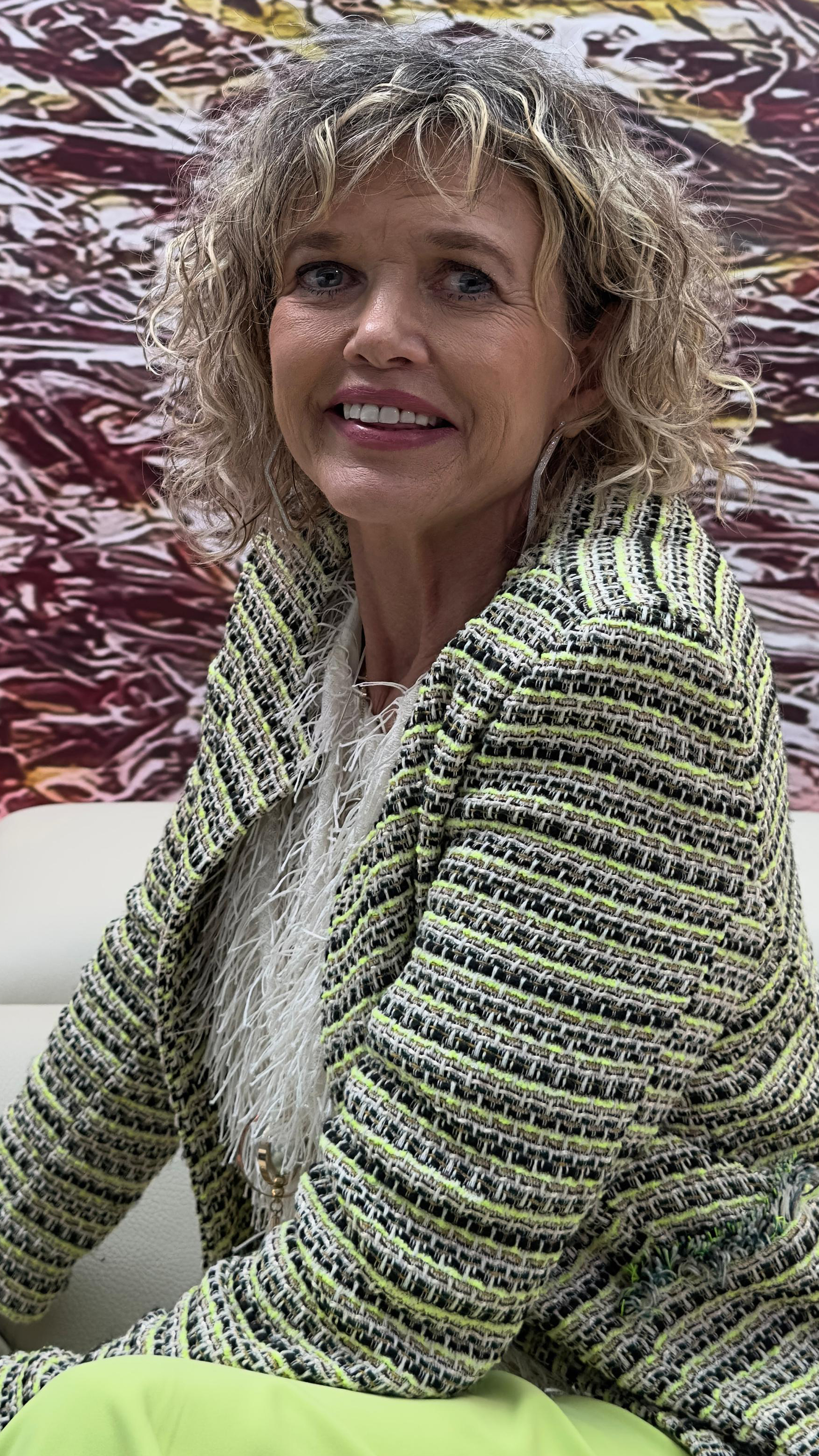
- Starr, pictured after her interview in 2024.
- Born: Marie-Christine Mareels; 5 September 1957 (age 68); Laarne, Belgium
- Occupation: singer

Emly Starr (birth name Marie-Christine Mareels; 5 September 1957 in Laarne, Belgium) is a Belgian disco singer. She also appeared in the documentary film Santiago Lovers by Romano Ferrari.

She has participated in several dance and song contests. In the World Popular Song Festival at Tokyo in 1980 with the entry "Mary Brown", she was finalist as Emly Starr Explosion.

Starr entered the Eurovision Song Contest 1981, where she performed "Samson" and finished in 13th place.

In 1985, she appeared in the role of Erika in the film Jumping (Dutch: Springen) directed by Jean-Pierre De Decker, a film which was submitted to the 59th Academy Awards for Best Foreign Language Film but not nominated, where she sang the song "Jump in the Dark", that was in the film's soundtrack.

== Discography ==
=== Singles ===
- "Tears of Gold" / idem instr. (1976)
- "Back to the Beatles" / "I'll risk it" (1977)
- "Cha Cha D'Amore" / idem instr. (1977)
- "Dance of love" / "My Time (is your time)" (1977)
- "No No Sheriff" / idem instr. (1978)
- "Santiago Lover" / idem instr. (1978)
- "Baby love me" / idem instr. (1979)
- "Hey Aloha (Honolulu)" / "Baby love me" (1979)
- "Do Svidaanja" / "Bee bop boogie" (1980)
- "Get Up" / "Music in the air" (1980)
- "Mary Brown" / "Rock 'n' Roll Woman" (1980, Japão)
- "Sweet Lips" / "Hang On" (1981)
- "Let Me Sing" / "Baby I need your loving" (1981)
- "Samson" (Samson & Delilah) (1981, in Dutch and English)
- "Dynamite" / idem instr. (1982)
- "Key To Your Heart" / "The Letter" (1983)
- "Jump in the Dark" / "I know (how to love you)" (1986)
- "Rock and roll woman" / "I need help" (1980–1981)

=== Albums ===
- 1980: Emly Starr
- 1980: The Best of Emly Starr Explosion
- 1981: Emly Starr Explosion
- 1982: Greatest Hits
- 1984: The Letter
- 2008: Greatest Hits (CD)

| Preceded by Telex with "Euro-Vision" | Belgium in the Eurovision Song Contest; 1981 | Succeeded by Stella Maessen with "Si tu aimes ma musique" |
