= Linda Williams (singer) =

Dutch singer

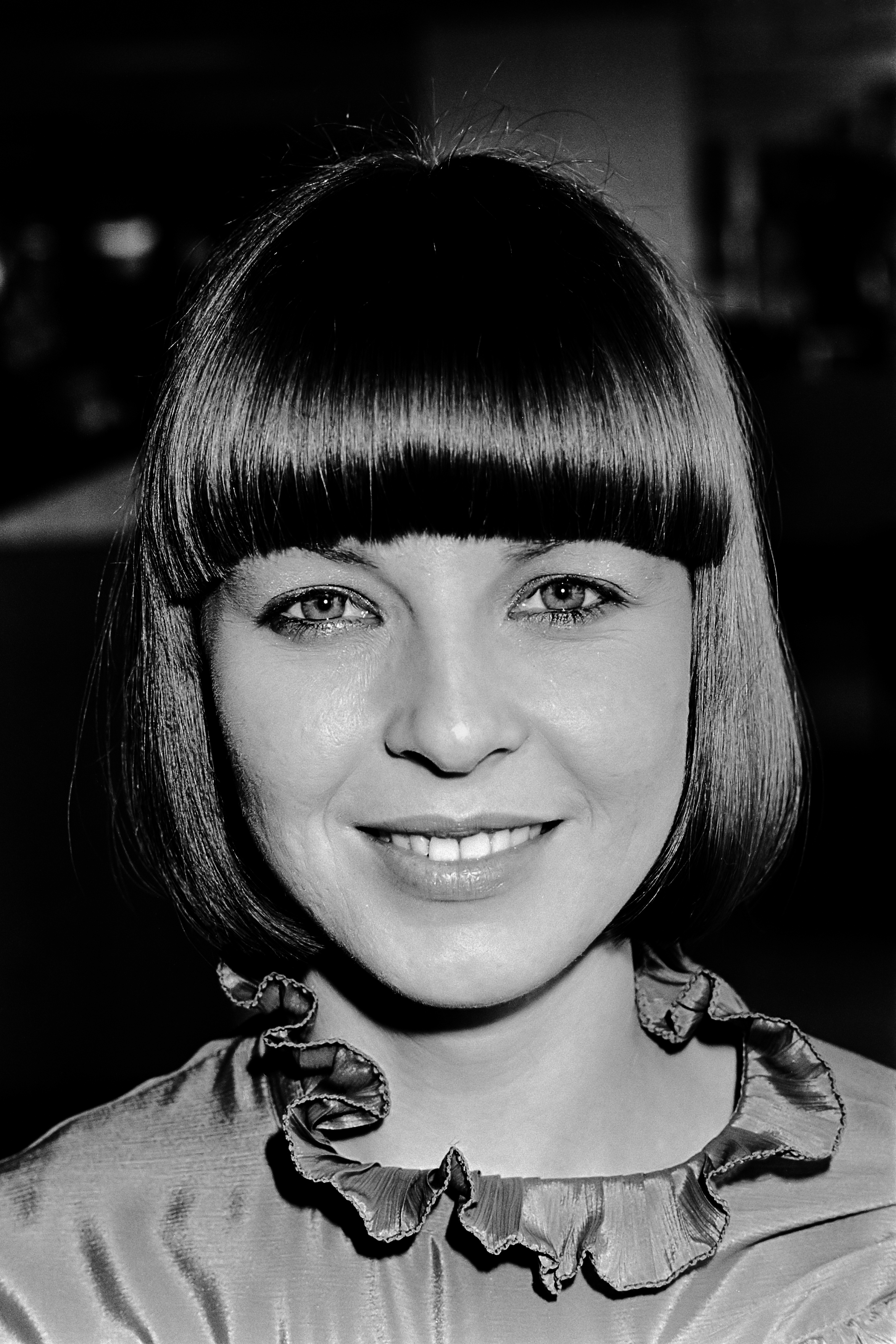
- Linda Williams in 1981

Background information
- Born: Henriëtte Willems; 11 June 1955 (age 71)
- Origin: Valkenswaard, Netherlands
- Genre: Pop
- Occupation: Singer

Linda Williams (born Henriëtte Willems on 11 June 1955) is a Dutch singer, best known for her participation in the 1981 Eurovision Song Contest.

Williams was unknown at the time she took part with two songs in the 1981 Dutch Eurovision selection, as a last-minute replacement for singer Oscar Harris, who had had to drop out at short notice. One of her songs, "Het is een wonder" ("It's a Miracle") emerged the winner, sending Williams forward to the 26th Eurovision Song Contest which took place in Dublin on 4 April. "Het is een wonder" finished the evening in ninth place of the 20 entries. The song backed with "Zo Is Het Leven" was released on TTR WEAN 18.499 that year.

Following her Eurovision appearance, Williams released a few singles which passed unnoticed, and soon returned to obscurity. She did however make another appearance on the Eurovision stage in 1999, when along with her daughter Eva-Jane, she was among the backing singers for that year's Belgian entrant, Vanessa Chinitor.

Awards and achievements
Preceded by Maggie MacNeal with "Amsterdam"	Netherlands in the Eurovision Song Contest; 1981	Succeeded by Bill van Dijk with "Jij en ik"
