= Switzerland in the Eurovision Song Contest 1981 =

- Eurovision Song Contest 1981
- Participating broadcaster: Swiss Broadcasting Corporation (SRG SSR)
- Country: Switzerland
- Selection process: Finale Suisse
- Selection date: 21 February 1981

Competing entry
- Song: "Io senza te"
- Artist: Peter, Sue and Marc
- Songwriters: Peter Reber; Nella Martinetti

Placement
- Final result: 4th, 121 points

Participation chronology

Switzerland was represented at the Eurovision Song Contest 1981 with the song "Io senza te", written by Peter Reber and Nella Martinetti, and performed by Peter, Sue and Marc. The Swiss participating broadcaster, the Swiss Broadcasting Corporation (SRG SSR), selected its entry for the contest through a national final.

== Before Eurovision ==
=== Finale Suisse ===
The Swiss Broadcasting Corporation (SRG SSR) held a national final to select its entry for the Eurovision Song Contest 1981. The broadcaster received 67 total song submissions, and initially selected four to take part in the selection (three in Italian and one in German). Due to the lack of songs selected by the juries, the broadcaster commissioned popular Swiss artists to submit two more songs— "San Gottardo" by Swiss Union and "Comme l'eau de la mer" by Pascal Auberson.

In total, six songs were set to compete, with three being in Italian, two in German, and one in French. Among the participants were Peter, Sue and Marc, who represented Switzerland in 1971, 1976 and 1979, and Piera Martell, who represented Switzerland in 1974, who was a member of Swiss Union. Mariella Farré would later represent Switzerland in 1983 and 1985, and Franz Müller— a member of Swiss Union and Rose Brown would represent Switzerland in 1984 as members of Rainy Day.

Swiss French broadcaster Télévision suisse romande (TSR) staged the national final on 21 February 1981 at 21:20 CET at the Palladium in Geneva. It was presented by Jean-Pierre Pastori. The Ken Warwick Ballet, the Le Feuillu Orchestra, and Jean Madd made guest appearances.

Commissioned

Participating entries
Broadcaster	Artist(s)	Song	Songwriter(s)		Language
Broadcaster	Artist(s)	Song	Composer(s)	Lyricist(s)	Language
TSI	Peter, Sue and Marc	"Io senza te"	Peter Reber	Nella Martinetti; Peter Reber	Italian
TSI	Ireen Indra	"Io"	Irene Schwendimann	Dany Bolla	Italian
TSI	Mariella Farré	"Una cosa meravigliosa"	Thomas Fortmann		Italian
DRS	Rose Brown	"Du fehlst mir"	Arth Paul; Günther Loose	Günther Loose	German
DRS	Swiss Union	"San Gottardo"	Peter Reber		German
TSR	Pascal Auberson	"Comme l'eau de la mer"	Pascal Auberson	Michel Bühler	French

The voting consisted of regional public votes which were sent to the three divisions of SRG SSR (DRS, TSR, TSI: German, French, and Italian speaking, respectively), a press jury, and an "expert" jury. Applications for viewers to join the regional juries were sent via postcard until 14 February, and 50 viewers from each canton were randomly selected to cast their votes to their broadcaster divisions via phone call. Additionally, one random voter in the public jury would be drawn to be invited to attend the Eurovision Song Contest as an audience member along with a companion. The selected voters were Mr. and Mrs. Melan from Rolle, who both registered to vote in a single postcard. The winner was the song "Io senza te", composed by Nella Martinetti and Peter Reber and performed by Peter, Sue and Marc, marking the fourth and last time the trio entered the Eurovision Song Contest.

Final — 21 February 1981
R/O	Artist(s)	Song	Regional Juries			Press Jury	Expert Jury	Total	Place
R/O	Artist(s)	Song	DRS	TSR	TSI	Press Jury	Expert Jury	Total	Place
1	Peter, Sue and Marc	"Io senza te"	4	5	7	7	7	30	1
2	Rose Brown	"Du fehlst mir"	3	2	3	1	4	13	5
3	Pascal Auberson	"Comme l'eau de la mer"	2	4	2	3	5	16	4
4	Ireen Indra	"Io"	5	4	5	4	3	21	3
5	Swiss Union	"San Gottardo"	7	7	4	5	2	25	2
6	Mariella Farré	"Una cosa meravigliosa"	1	1	1	2	1	6	6

=== Releases ===
Peter, Sue and Marc first recorded and released "Io senza te" in Italian, German as "Ich Ohne Dich", and English as "Me Without You" in 1981. In 1998, the song was featured in a CD compilation titled "Concours Eurovision De La Chanson 1956-1998: Schweizer Beiträge", which compiled every Swiss Eurovision entry at the time.

Most of the other songs in the selection were also commercially released that same year. "Du fehlst mir" by Rose Brown was not released commercially. The full selection has been archived by SRG SSR and is able to be watched online.

== At Eurovision ==
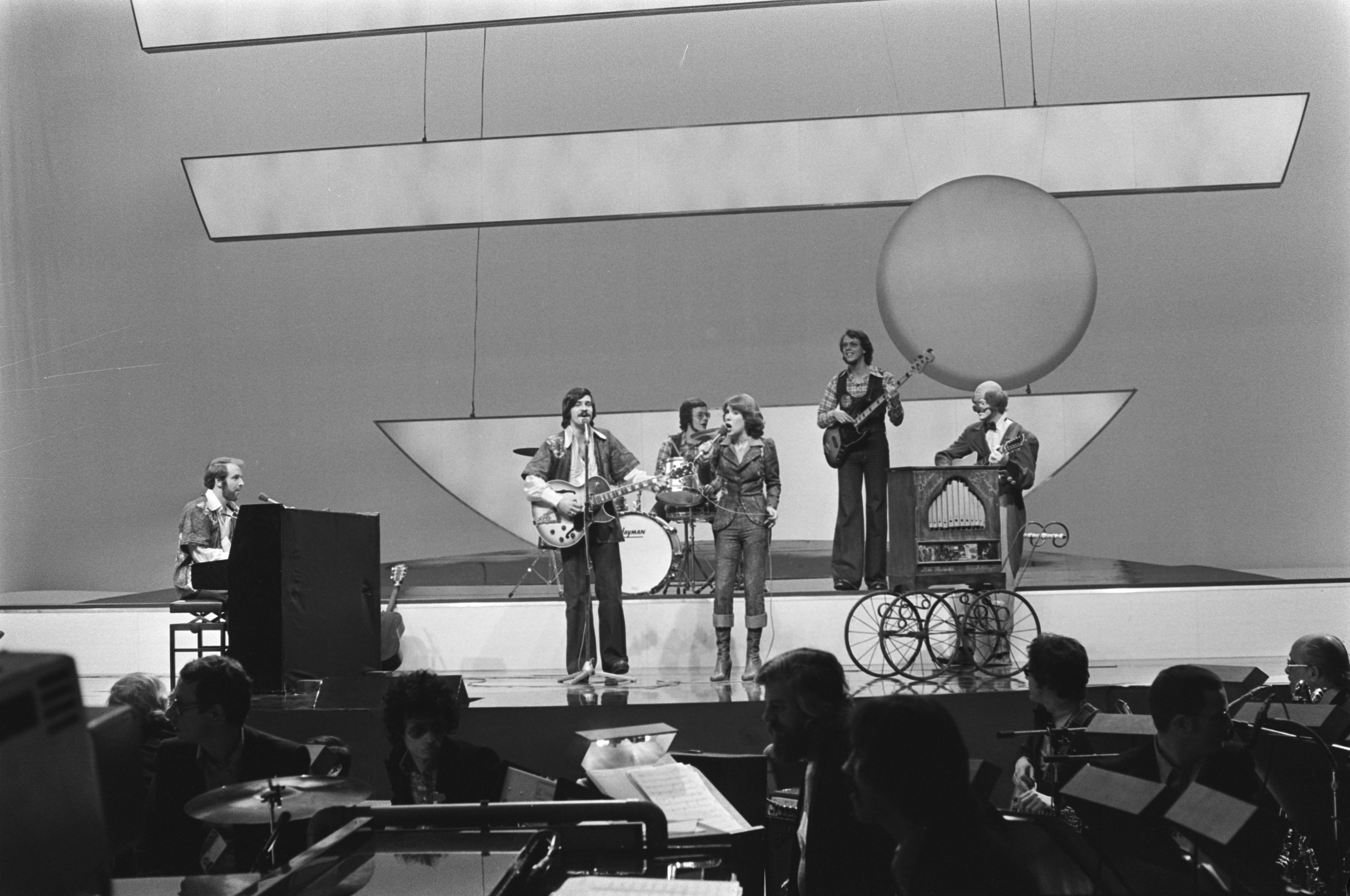
Peter, Sue and Marc (pictured in their 1976 participation) represented Switzerland in the Eurovision Song Contest 1981

At the Eurovision Song Contest 1981, held at the RDS Simmonscourt in Dublin, the Swiss entry was the nineteenth entry of the night following Cyprus and preceding Sweden. The Swiss conductor at the contest was Rolf Zuckowski, who previously conducted the 1979 Swiss entry. At the close of voting, Switzerland had received 121 points in total; finishing in fourth place out of twenty countries.

The contest was broadcast on SRG SSR via TV DRS (Note: Broadcast through a second audio programme on TSR) (with commentary from Theodor Haller) in German-speaking Switzerland, TSR (with commentary from Georges Hardy) in Romandy, and TSI (with commentary from Giovanni Bertini) in Ticino.

=== Voting ===
Each participating broadcaster assembled a jury panel with at least eleven members. The jurors awarded 1-8, 10, and 12 points to their top ten songs.

Points awarded to Switzerland
Score	Country
12 points	Finland; Ireland; Norway; United Kingdom; Yugoslavia
10 points	Cyprus; France
8 points	Luxembourg; Portugal
7 points	Germany
6 points	
5 points	
4 points	Denmark; Greece; Spain
3 points	
2 points	Austria; Turkey
1 point	Netherlands; Sweden

Points awarded by Switzerland
Score	Country
12 points	France
10 points	Yugoslavia
8 points	United Kingdom
7 points	Greece
6 points	Luxembourg
5 points	Finland
4 points	Israel
3 points	Cyprus
2 points	Spain
1 point	Ireland
