= Finn Kalvik =

Norwegian singer and composer (born 1947)

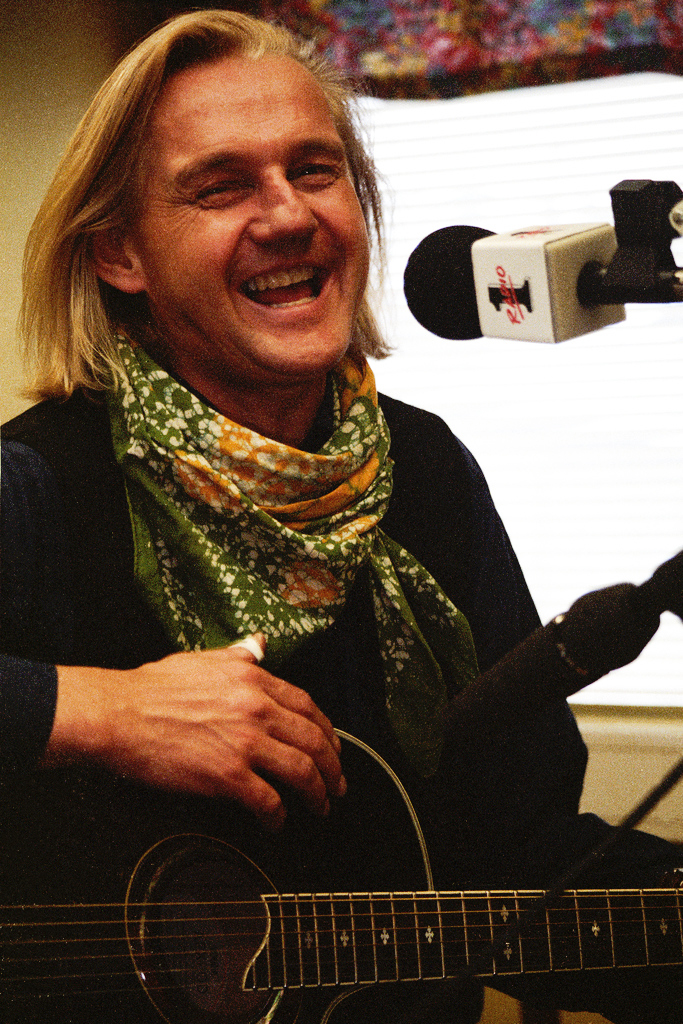
Finn Kalvik.

Finn Bjørn Kalvik (born 30 April 1947) is a Norwegian singer and composer. He represented Norway in the Eurovision Song Contest 1981.

== Early career ==
He was born in Fåvang, but his family moved to the working class district of Grorud, Oslo in 1952. Early in his career Kalvik found success putting music to the poetry of popular Norwegian writers André Bjerke and Inger Hagerup. He made his breakthrough in 1969 with the song Finne meg sjæl, and he also had major hits in 1971 with En tur rundt i byen (based on Ralph McTell's Streets Of London) and in 1975 with Ride ranke (based on Harry Chapin's Cat's in the Cradle).

His first four albums reached top 15 on the Norwegian record charts: Tusenfryd og grå hverdag (1971), Finn (1972), Nøkkelen ligger under matta (1974) and Fyll mine seil (1976). The 1979 album Kom ut kom fram (1979) was produced by ABBA member/composer Benny Andersson; so was the 1981 album Natt og dag. The 1982 album Tenn dine vakre øyne reached top 20 on the charts.

== Eurovision and later years ==
One of the songs on Natt og dag was "Aldri i livet" (Never in my life), with which Kalvik won the Norwegian Melodi Grand Prix in 1981. However his performance in the European finals ended with an infamous zero points. The song was still a big success in Norway, and was even recorded in English as "Here in My Heart" with lyrics by Ralph McTell and backing vocals by ABBA's Agnetha Fältskog and Annifrid Lyngstad. He returned to Melodi Grand Prix once more in 1987 when he sang his song "Malene" to a fourth place in the Norwegian selection. The song was dedicated to his daughter.

Later albums include Det søte liv (1984), Livets lyse side (1988), Innsida ut (1991), I egne hender (1995), Imellom to evigheter (2000), Klassisk Kalvik (2002), Dagdrivernotater (2004) and Klassisk Kalvik II (2005). The two "Klassisk Kalvik" albums were re-recordings of old songs with a symphony orchestra. In 2000 Kalvik also scored a hit with a version of Andersson's song Tröstevisa, performed as a duet with Swedish singer CajsaStina Åkerström.

Kalvik is also an avid painter.

In 1998 the comedy program Åpen post featured a segment called "Finn Kalvik-nyhetene", Finn Kalvik news, where jokes were made about Kalvik. The segment caused mental distress for Kalvik, and the jokesters Harald Eia and Bård Tufte Johansen had to apologize publicly (via the show's producer, Lars Hognestad).

Awards and achievements
Preceded by Sverre Kjelsberg & Mattis Hætta with "Sámiid Ædnan"	Norway in the Eurovision Song Contest; 1981	Succeeded by Jahn Teigen & Anita Skorgan with "Adieu"
