= Finland in the Eurovision Song Contest 1981 =

- Eurovision Song Contest 1981
- Participating broadcaster: Yleisradio (Yle)
- Country: Finland
- Selection process: National final
- Selection date: 21 February 1981

Competing entry
- Song: "Reggae OK"
- Artist: Riki Sorsa
- Songwriters: Jim Pembroke; Olli Ojala

Placement
- Final result: 16th, 27 points

Participation chronology

Finland was represented at the Eurovision Song Contest 1981 with the song "Reggae OK", composed by Jim Pembroke, with lyrics by Olli Ojala, and performed by Riki Sorsa. The Finnish participating broadcaster, Yleisradio (Yle), selected its entry through a national final.

== Before Eurovision ==
=== Semi-final ===
Yleisradio (Yle) invited 15 composers for the competition. The semi-final was held on 29 January 1981, hosted by Erkki Pohjanheimo. From the 15 songs eight finalists were chosen by postcard voting, of which a total of 265,573 were sent. The finalists were announced on 6 February 1981. The winner of the postcard voting was "Titanic" performed by Frederik.

The full semi-final results were supposed to be revealed after the final, but due to the complaints and negative reception about the final's results, Yle eventually did not reveal them.

Songs eliminated in the semi-final
Artist	Song	Songwriter(s)
Aija Pentinmikko	"Virta"	Yari; Hector
Cumulus	"Jos vielä ees kerran sais kunnon jenkan"	Kim Kuusi; Juha Vainio
Eija Ahvo	"Allegro"	Jukka Linkola; Jaana Lappo
Leevi and the Leavings	"Sinisilmä, mansikkasuu"	Gösta Sundqvist
Marketta Joutsi	"Tangetto"	Rauno Lehtinen; Vexi Salmi
Pepe Willberg	"Nouse aamuusi"	Mikko Jokela; Asko Raivio
Tomas Ek	"Tuhlaajapoika"	Tomas Ek; Pasi Hiihtola

=== Final ===
The final was hosted by Erkki Pohjanheimo, at Yle Studio 2 in Helsinki, which took place on 21 February 1981. The winning song was selected by an expert jury, two of which included former Finnish Eurovision contestants Marion Rung and Lasse Mårtenson. Each juror distributed their points as follows: 1–3, 5 and 8 points.

Final – 21 February 1981
R/O	Artist	Song	Songwriter(s)	Points	Place
1	Tapani Kansa	"Sunnuntailapsi"	Esko Koivumies	5	6
2	Paula Koivuniemi	"Ei tule toista kertaa"	Esa Nieminen; Juha Vainio	1	8
3	Mikko Alatalo	"Leuhkat eväät"	Mikko Alatalo; Harri Rinne	30	2
4	Frederik	"Titanic"	Jori Sivonen; Raul Reiman	3	7
5	Taiska	"Hiroshima"	Raul Reiman	27	3
6	Markku Aro and Nisa Soraya	"Mun suothan tulla vierees sun"	Veikko Samuli; Juha Vainio	13	5
7	Riki Sorsa	"Reggae OK"	Jim Pembroke; Olli Ojala	66	1
8	Juice Leskinen Slamfonia	"Ilomantsi"	Juice Leskinen	26	4

Jury votes
R/O	Song	Åke Granholm	Marion Rung	John Wikström	Arto Pajukallio	Upi Sorvali	Liisa Lääveri	Jarmo Porola	Kati Bergman	Lasse Mårtenson	Total
1	"Sunnuntailapsi"		2	1	1		1				5
2	"Ei tule toista kertaa"		1								1
3	"Leuhkat eväät"	3	3	5	3	3	3	3	2	5	30
4	"Titanic"					1		1		1	3
5	"Hiroshima"	2		3	2	2	2	5	8	3	27
6	"Mun suothan tulla vierees sun"	1	5					2	3	2	13
7	"Reggae OK"	8	8	8	5	8	8	8	5	8	66
8	"Ilomantsi"	5		2	8	5	5		1		26

== At Eurovision ==
On the night Sorsa performed eighth (following Yugoslavia and preceding France). Sorsa was accompanied by Pedro Hietanen as a keyboardist and an accordionist, Keimo Hirvonen as a drummer, Risto Hankala as a bassist and a backing vocalist, and Jukka Orma and Jim Pembroke as guitarists and backing vocalists. For the first time in 15 years regular Finnish conductor Ossi Runne did not conduct the Finnish entry (instead he was providing the Yle television commentary) and was instead conducted by Otto Donner. At the close of voting "Reggae OK" had picked up 27 points, placing Finland in 16th place out of 20. The Finnish jury awarded its 12 points to Switzerland.

=== Voting ===
Points awarded to Finland
Score	Country
12 points	
10 points	
8 points	
7 points	
6 points	Sweden
5 points	Ireland; Netherlands; Switzerland
4 points	
3 points	
2 points	Israel; Spain
1 point	France; Portugal

Points awarded by Finland
Score	Country
12 points	Switzerland
10 points	France
8 points	Yugoslavia
7 points	Germany
6 points	Israel
5 points	Turkey
4 points	Luxembourg
3 points	United Kingdom
2 points	Belgium
1 point	Sweden
