= Turkey in the Eurovision Song Contest 1981 =

- Eurovision Song Contest 1981
- Participating broadcaster: Turkish Radio and Television Corporation (TRT)
- Country: Turkey
- Selection process: 5. Eurovision Şarkı Yarışması Türkiye Finali
- Selection date: 14 February 1981

Competing entry
- Song: "Dönme Dolap"
- Artist: Modern Folk Trio and Ayşegül
- Songwriters: Ali Kocatepe

Placement
- Final result: 18th, 9 points

Participation chronology

Turkey was represented at the Eurovision Song Contest 1981 with the song "Dönme Dolap" ("Ferris wheel"), written by Ali Kocatepe, and performed by the Modern Folk Trio and Ayşegül. The Turkish participating broadcaster, the Turkish Radio and Television Corporation (TRT), selected its entry through a national final.

== Before Eurovision ==
=== 5. Eurovision Şarkı Yarışması Türkiye Finali ===
The Turkish Radio and Television Corporation (TRT) held the national final on 14 February 1981 at its studios in Ankara, hosted by Bülend Özveren. Six songs competed and the winner was determined by a jury consisting of members of the public.

Final – 14 February 1981
R/O	Artist	Song	Lyricist	Composer	Points	Place
1	Kayahan	"Dostluk"	Leyla Seber	Aydın Esen	—N/a	6
2	İbo & Grup Vize	"Nerede O Eski Tangolar?"	Olcayto Ahmet Tuğsuz		—N/a	5
3	Ayşegül Aldinç & Modern Folk Üçlüsü	"İstanbul İstanbul"	Ülkü Aker	Cenk Taşkan	—N/a	3
4	Coşkun Demir	"Miras"	Ali Kocatepe		—N/a	4
5	Füsun Önal	"Bigudi"	Ayşe Irmak Manioğlu	Selçuk Başar	60	2
6	Ayşegül Aldinç & Modern Folk Üçlüsü	"Dönme Dolap"	Ali Kocatepe		87	1

== At Eurovision ==
On the evening of the contest Ayşegül Aldinç and Modern Folk Üçlüsü performed second in the running order following Austria and preceding Germany. At the close of the voting the song received 9 points, thus Dönme Dolap shared 18th place with Portugal. The Turkish jury awarded 12 points to Germany.

Members of the Turkish jury included Süheyla Aldoğan, Hidayet Yarken, Hatice Akbaş, Lüftiye Duman, Nebiye Yazıcı, Nesrin Demirel, Sami Ersoy, Mehmet Kuteş, Mustafa Ekinci, Cengiz Doğan, and Ali Arslan.

=== Voting ===
Points awarded to Turkey
Score	Country
12 points	
10 points	
8 points	
7 points	
6 points	
5 points	Finland
4 points	
3 points	Yugoslavia
2 points	
1 point	Luxembourg

Points awarded by Turkey
Score	Country
12 points	Germany
10 points	Spain
8 points	United Kingdom
7 points	Belgium
6 points	Austria
5 points	Netherlands
4 points	Yugoslavia
3 points	Ireland
2 points	Switzerland
1 point	Denmark
