= Netherlands in the Eurovision Song Contest 1981 =

- Eurovision Song Contest 1981
- Participating broadcaster: Nederlandse Omroep Stichting (NOS)
- Country: Netherlands
- Selection process: Nationaal Songfestival 1981
- Selection date: 11 March 1981

Competing entry
- Song: "Het is een wonder"
- Artist: Linda Williams
- Songwriters: Cees de Wit; Bart van de Laar

Placement
- Final result: 9th, 51 points

Participation chronology

The Netherlands was represented at the Eurovision Song Contest 1981 with the song "Het is een wonder", composed by Cees de Wit, with lyrics by Bart van de Laar, and performed by Linda Williams. The Dutch participating broadcaster, Nederlandse Omroep Stichting (NOS), selected its entry through a national final.

== Before Eurovision ==
=== Nationaal Songfestival 1981 ===
Nederlandse Omroep Stichting (NOS) held the national final at the Theater Zuidplein in Rotterdam, hosted by Fred Oster and Elles Berger. Five acts took part performing two songs each and voting was by 12 regional juries, who each had 10 points to divide between the songs. Previous Dutch entrant Ben Cramer (1973) and future representative Maribelle (1984) were among the acts taking part. "Het is een wonder" was the only song to receive votes from every jury and emerged the winner by a 7-point margin.

Final – 11 March 1981
R/O	Artist	Song	Points	Place
1	Lucy Steymel	"Een nieuw begin"	8	5
2	Lucy Steymel	"Stap voor stap"	8	5
3	Maribelle	"Marionette"	27	2
4	Maribelle	"Fantasie"	23	3
5	Ben Cramer	"Retour"	3	8
6	Ben Cramer	"Marianne"	0	10
7	The Familee	"Sim sa la bim"	2	9
8	The Familee	"Festival"	9	4
9	Linda Williams	"Het is een wonder"	34	1
10	Linda Williams	"Zo is het leven"	6	7

== At Eurovision ==
On the night of the final Williams performed 11th in the running order, following Spain and preceding Ireland. At the close of voting "Het is een wonder" had received 51 points from 12 countries, placing the Netherlands 9th of the 20 entries. The Dutch jury awarded its 12 points to contest winners the United Kingdom.

The Dutch conductor at the contest was Rogier van Otterloo.

=== Voting ===
Points awarded to the Netherlands
Score	Country
12 points	
10 points	
8 points	
7 points	Denmark; Portugal; Spain
6 points	United Kingdom
5 points	Turkey
4 points	Israel
3 points	Austria; Germany; Greece
2 points	Belgium; Cyprus; France
1 point	

Points awarded by the Netherlands
Score	Country
12 points	United Kingdom
10 points	Ireland
8 points	Cyprus
7 points	Israel
6 points	France
5 points	Finland
4 points	Spain
3 points	Germany
2 points	Denmark
1 point	Switzerland
