= France in the Eurovision Song Contest 1981 =

- Eurovision Song Contest 1981
- Participating broadcaster: Télévision Française 1 (TF1)
- Country: France
- Selection process: Concours de la Chanson française pour l'Eurovision 1981
- Selection date: 8 March 1981

Competing entry
- Song: "Humanahum"
- Artist: Jean Gabilou
- Songwriters: Jean-Paul Cara; Joe Gracy

Placement
- Final result: 3rd, 125 points

Participation chronology

France was represented at the Eurovision Song Contest 1981 with the song "Humanahum", composed by Jean-Paul Cara, with lyrics by Joe Gracy, and performed by Jean Gabilou. The French participating broadcaster, Télévision Française 1 (TF1), selected its entry through a national final.

== Before Eurovision ==
=== Concours de la Chanson Française pour l'Eurovision 1981 ===
Télévision Française 1 (TF1) held the national final on 8 March 1981 at its studios in Paris, hosted by television hostess Fabienne Égal. Six songs made it to the national final after two semi-final heats. The winner was decided by a random sampling of 1,086 television viewers who were contacted by TF1 and asked which song was their favorite.

The winning entry was "Humanahum", performed by Jean Gabilou and composed by Jean-Paul Cara with lyrics by Joe Gracy. Cara and Gracy also penned the 1977 Contest winner "L'oiseau et l'enfant". Gabilou, a Tahitian singer, was the first ever to represent France from one of its overseas territories.

The order of the songs presented on the night of the Contest vary from other published material.

Final – 8 March 1981
R/O	Artist	Song	Points	Place
1	Amour	"Un homme s'était levé"	116	6
2	Evelyne Geller	"Les yeux fermés"	165	3
3	Jean Gabilou	"Humanahum"	273	1
4	Frida Boccara	"Voilà comment je t'aime"	159	4
5	Jeff Barnel	"De visage en visage"	131	5
6	Jorge Rafael	"C'est un oiseau de papier"	242	2

== At Eurovision ==
Jean Gabilou performed ninth on the night of the contest, following Finland and preceding Spain. At the close of the voting the song had received 125 points, placing 3rd in a field of 20 competing countries.

=== Voting ===
Points awarded to France
Score	Country
12 points	Austria; Germany; Luxembourg; Switzerland
10 points	Finland; Portugal; Sweden
8 points	Greece
7 points	Cyprus; Israel
6 points	Netherlands
5 points	Norway
4 points	Ireland; Yugoslavia
3 points	Belgium
2 points	Denmark
1 point	United Kingdom

Points awarded by France
Score	Country
12 points	Sweden
10 points	Switzerland
8 points	Germany
7 points	United Kingdom
6 points	Ireland
5 points	Austria
4 points	Denmark
3 points	Luxembourg
2 points	Netherlands
1 point	Finland
