= Sheeba =

Irish band

- Origin: Ireland
- Genres: Pop; MOR
- Instrument: Vocals
- Years active: 1977–1984
- Past members: Maxi; Frances Campbell; Marion Fossett

Sheeba were an all-girl pop trio popular in Ireland in the late 1970s and early 1980s. The members were Maxi, Marion Fossett and Frances Campbell. They are best known for representing Ireland, the host nation, in the Eurovision Song Contest 1981 with "Horoscopes".

== History ==
In 1978, the group took part in the Irish National Song Contest, which selected Ireland's entry for that year's Eurovision Song Contest. They failed to win with their song "It's Amazing What Love Can Do". They went on to release several singles in Ireland with producer Roberto Danova, although their biggest hit was their eventual Eurovision entry "Horoscopes", which reached No.3.

Following their exposure in the 1981 contest, they signed a recording contract in the UK and released the singles "The Next Night" and "Mystery". Neither of these found success although were performed on UK TV shows such as 'Lena' (BBC2) and 'The UK Disco Dancing Championships' (ITV.) Exposure on Eurovision also led to concert tours in Europe and Japan. The following year, they entered RTÉ's National Song Contest final again with a song performed in Irish; Go Raibh Maith Agat ("Thank You"), but were unsuccessful. Later in 1982 they were involved in a road accident in the West of Ireland that brought their career to an eventual halt due to their reluctance to continue touring. The group shared vocal duties with Maggie Moone on the UK ITV series Name That Tune. After a Japanese tour in 1983, they decided to split, but did compete one more time in the National Song Contest in 1984, where they finished fourth with "My Love and You" behind future Eurovision winners Linda Martin and Charlie McGettigan.

Maxi went on to be a broadcaster with RTÉ in Dublin, where she hosted both TV and radio shows for many years, including Eurosong 1987, which was won by Johnny Logan ahead of his second Eurovision win. Marion Fossett was ringmistress of the family circus, Fossetts. Frances Campbell worked as a broadcaster for BBC Radio Foyle in Northern Ireland.

Marion Fossett died on 5 June 2026, at the age of 71.

== See also ==
- List of one-hit wonders in Ireland

Awards and achievements
Preceded by Johnny Logan with "What's Another Year"	Ireland in the Eurovision Song Contest; 1981	Succeeded by The Duskeys with "Here Today Gone Tomorrow"
