= Seid Memić Vajta =

Bosnian singer

- Also known as: Vajta
- Born: Seid Memić; 8 March 1950 (age 76); Travnik, PR Bosnia and Herzegovina, Yugoslavia
- Genres: Pop, rock
- Years active: 1973–present
- Labels: Jugoton, Diskoton, Croatia Records
- Website: http://www.vajta.de

Seid Memić, known by his stage name Vajta, (born 8 March 1950) is a Bosnian singer and the vocalist for the Yugoslav rock band Teška industrija ("Heavy Industry").

In 1973, Vajta moved to Sarajevo, which is when his music career began in earnest. From 1975 to 1976 he was a vocalist for Teška Industrija, who enjoyed great commercial success throughout the Balkan countries but later dissolved.

Soon, though, Vajta left the band to start a career as a pop singer. In the years from 1979-85, the albums "Zlatna Ribica" (Goldfish), "Vajta 2 Ponoćni valcer" (Midnight Waltz), "Tebi pjevam" (Singing to You) and "Kad bulbuli pjevaju" (When Bulbuls Sing) brought him to the heights of popularity throughout the former Yugoslavia and made him a household name.

He became internationally known representing Yugoslavia in the Eurovision Song Contest 1981. He achieved 15th place for Yugoslavia with the song "Lejla", which became a hit and is still known throughout the Balkan countries.

He hosted the kids' programme Nedeljni zabavnik in the 1980s.

With the breakout of the Bosnian war, he moved to Germany. He first settled in Hamburg, before moving to Pula, Croatia, where he continues to lives today.

In early 2007, Teška Industrija reunited and released a new album.

In 2009, Vajta attained popularity by participating in the Croatian reality TV show Farma, where he was evicted in the 6th duel on April 10.

Preceded by Ambasadori	Yugoslavia in the Eurovision Song Contest; 1981	Succeeded by Aska
