= Cyprus in the Eurovision Song Contest 1981 =

- Eurovision Song Contest 1981
- Participating broadcaster: Cyprus Broadcasting Corporation (CyBC)
- Country: Cyprus
- Selection process: Internal selection
- Announcement date: 29 January 1981

Competing entry
- Song: "Monika"
- Artist: Island
- Songwriters: Doros Georgiades; Stavros Sideras

Placement
- Final result: 6th, 69 points

Participation chronology

Cyprus was represented at the Eurovision Song Contest 1981 with the song "Monika", composed by Doros Georgiades, with lyrics by Stavros Sideras, and performed by the group Island. The Cypriot participating broadcaster, the Cyprus Broadcasting Corporation (CyBC), internally selected its entry for the contest. This was the first-ever entry from Cyprus in the Eurovision Song Contest.

== Before Eurovision ==
=== Internal selection ===
The Cyprus Broadcasting Corporation (CyBC) opened a submission period for Cypriot artists and composers to submit songs until 18 January 1981, with the deadline later being extended to 21 January 1981. Each artist or composer was only allowed to submit up to two entries each. By the end of the submission period, CyBC had received 22 entries, of which four were invalid. The internal selection took place on 29 January 1981 and the results were decided by a 7-member professional jury who listened to recordings of each submitted entry and unanimously chose "Monika" as the winning song.

To ensure anonymity of the composers of the non-winning submitted songs, the tapes of all non-winning entries were destroyed after the selection was complete. Thus, very little is known about any other competing entries besides the eventual winner. It is also unknown who the performer(s) of "Monika" were on the submitted recording. "Monika" was also submitted to the Greek 1980 selection but was rejected.

=== Artist selection ===
Doros Georgiades and Stavros Sideras, along with CyBC, searched for two women and two men to perform the song at the Eurovision Song Contest. The chosen performers were Areti Kasapi Charalambidou, Alexia Vassiliou, Aristos Moschovakis, and Roger Lee. Along with Doros Georgiades, these five members formed the group Island.

== At Eurovision ==
On the night of the final Island performed eighteenth in the running order, following Greece and preceding Switzerland. At the close of voting "Monika" had received 69 points, placing Cyprus in 6th of the 20 participating countries. The Cypriot jury awarded its 12 points to Ireland.

=== Voting ===
Points awarded to Cyprus
| Score | Country |
|---|---|
| 12 points | Greece |
| 10 points | United Kingdom |
| 8 points | Ireland; Netherlands |
| 7 points | Belgium; Norway |
| 6 points | Yugoslavia |
| 5 points | Israel |
| 4 points | |
| 3 points | Denmark; Switzerland |
| 2 points | |
| 1 point | |

Points awarded by Cyprus
| Score | Country |
|---|---|
| 12 points | Ireland |
| 10 points | Switzerland |
| 8 points | Germany |
| 7 points | France |
| 6 points | Greece |
| 5 points | Belgium |
| 4 points | United Kingdom |
| 3 points | Yugoslavia |
| 2 points | Netherlands |
| 1 point | Sweden |
