= Israel in the Eurovision Song Contest 1981 =

- Eurovision Song Contest 1981
- Participating broadcaster: Israel Broadcasting Authority (IBA)
- Country: Israel
- Selection process: Kdam Eurovision 1981
- Selection date: 3 March 1981

Competing entry
- Song: "Halayla"
- Artist: Habibi
- Songwriters: Shuki Levy; Shlomit Aharon; Yuval Dor

Placement
- Final result: 7th, 56 points

Participation chronology

Israel was represented at the Eurovision Song Contest 1981 with the song "Halayla", composed by Shuki Levy, with lyrics by Shlomit Aharon and Yuval Dor, and performed by the band Habibi. The Israeli participating broadcaster, the Israel Broadcasting Authority (IBA), selected its entry through Kdam Eurovision 1981. IBA returned at the Eurovision Song Contest, after withdrawing from the 1980 contest because of National Day of Remembrance.

== Before Eurovision ==
=== Kdam Eurovision 1981 ===
The Israel Broadcasting Authority (IBA) decided to replace the Israel Song Festival with a new competition designed to select a song for the contest.

The final was held on 3 March 1981 in Jerusalem, and was hosted by Daniel Pe'er. The votes of nine regional juries across Israel decided the winner.

The winning entry was "Halayla", performed by Hakol Over Habibi and composed by Shuki Levy, with lyrics written by Shlomit Aharon and Yuval Dor.

Final – 3 March 1981
R/O	Artist	Song	Points	Place
1	Eitan Masuri	"Etmol" (אתמול)	35	7
2	Milk and Honey	"Serenada" (סרנדה)	61	4
3	Mike Burstyn	"Sviv kol ha'olam" (סביב כל העולם)	57	6
4	Sexta	"Cinderella" (סינדרלה)	75	2
5	Miri Aloni	"Piyus" (פיוס)	11	10
6	Irit Bulka	"Mona Lisa" (מונה ליזה)	31	8
7	Gary Eckstein	"Aya ve Dan" (איה ודן)	4	12
8	Hedva Amrani	"Bo elai" (בוא אליי)	24	9
9	Shlomo Gronich & Dafna Armoni	"Kaleidoscope" (קליידוסקופ)	6	11
10	Avi Toledano	"Karnaval" (קרנבל)	69	3
11	Hakol Over Habibi	"Halayla" (הלילה)	91	1
12	Yigal Bashan	"Ten li" (תן לי)	58	5

Detailed Regional Jury Votes
R/O	Song	Tel Aviv	Karmiel	Kfar Saba	Haifa	Tzora	Herzliya	Ashdod	Lakhish	Jerusalem	Total
1	"Etmol"	8	2	4	8		2	5	6		35
2	"Serenada"	10	6	6	7	8	7	7	3	7	61
3	"Sviv kol ha'olam"	4	5	5	12	10	5	4	10	2	57
4	"Cinderella"	12	7	8	5	5	12	12	2	12	75
5	"Piyus"			2		3			1	5	11
6	"Mona Lisa"	3	4	3	3	4	3	2	5	4	31
7	"Aya ve Dan"		1			1	1			1	4
8	"Bo elai"	2	3	1	1		4	3	4	6	24
9	"Kaleidoscope"	1			2	2		1			6
10	"Karnaval"	5	12	10	6	7	6	8	7	8	69
11	"Halayla"	7	8	12	10	12	10	10	12	10	91
12	"Ten li"	6	10	7	4	6	8	6	8	3	58

== At Eurovision ==
On the evening of the final Hakol Over Habibi, performing as Habibi, performed 5th in the running order, following Luxembourg and preceding Denmark. Shlomit Aharon, the band's soloist, was in about 6–7 months pregnant at the contest. At the close of voting "Halayla" had received 56 points, placing Israel seventh of the 20 entries. IBA appointed Dan Kaner as its spokesperson to announce the result of the Israeli vote in the final.

=== Voting ===
Points awarded to Israel
Score	Country
12 points	
10 points	
8 points	Austria; Norway
7 points	Ireland; Netherlands
6 points	Finland
5 points	Portugal
4 points	Luxembourg; Switzerland; United Kingdom
3 points	Sweden
2 points	
1 point	

Points awarded by Israel
Score	Country
12 points	United Kingdom
10 points	Ireland
8 points	Germany
7 points	France
6 points	Spain
5 points	Cyprus
4 points	Netherlands
3 points	Luxembourg
2 points	Finland
1 point	Belgium
