= Fångad i en dröm =

1981 single by Björn Skifs

Single by Björn Skifs
- Language: Swedish
- B-side: "Stackare, stackare"
- Released: 1981
- Length: 2:59
- Label: EMI
- Songwriters: Björn Skifs; Bengt Palmers
- Producers: Björn Skifs; Bengt Palmers

Björn Skifs singles chronology
"Lack of Courage" (1979)	"Fångad i en dröm" (1981)	"Baby, Let's Run Away" (1983)

Eurovision Song Contest 1981 entry
- Country: Sweden
- Artist: Björn Skifs
- Language: Swedish
- Composer: Björn Skifs
- Lyricist: Björn Skifs
- Conductor: Anders Berglund

Finals performance
- Final result: 10th
- Final points: 50

Entry chronology
- ◄ "Just nu!" (1980)
- "Dag efter dag" (1982) ►

"Fångad i en dröm" (Swedish pronunciation: [ˈfɔ̂ŋːad iː ɛn ˈdrœmː]; "Captured in a Dream") is a song written and composed by Björn Skifs and Bengt Palmers, and the Swedish entry in the Eurovision Song Contest 1981, performed by Skifs. The song finished in tenth place.

== Track listing ==
- Swedish 7-inch single

A. "Fångad i en dröm" – 2:59
B. "Stackare, stackare" – 4:05

== Charts ==
Chart (1981)	Peak position
Sweden (Sverigetopplistan)	11
