= Yugoslavia in the Eurovision Song Contest 1981 =

- Eurovision Song Contest 1981
- Participating broadcaster: Jugoslavenska radiotelevizija (JRT)
- Country: Yugoslavia
- Selection process: Jugovizija 1981
- Selection date: 28 February 1981

Competing entry
- Song: "Lejla"
- Artist: Seid Memić Vajta
- Songwriters: Ranko Boban

Placement
- Final result: 15th, 35 points

Participation chronology

Yugoslavia was represented at the Eurovision Song Contest 1981 with the song "Lejla", written by Ranko Boban, and performed by Seid Memić Vajta. The Yugoslav participating broadcaster, Jugoslavenska radiotelevizija (JRT), selected its entry through Jugovizija 1981.

== Before Eurovision ==
=== Jugovizija 1981 ===
After a four-year break, Jugoslavenska radiotelevizija (JRT) returned to the Eurovision Song Contest in 1981.

RTV Belgrade staged the Yugoslav national final, Jugovizija 1981, on 28 February at its television studios in Belgrade, hosted by Minja Subota and Helga Vlahović. Each of the eight JRT participating sub-national broadcasters (RTV Sarajevo, RTV Skopje, RTV Novi Sad, RTV Titograd, RTV Zagreb, RTV Belgrade, RTV Ljubljana, and RTV Pristina) entered two songs to Jugovizija, making a national final of sixteen songs. The winner was decided by the votes of the regional juries of the eight broadcasters, which could not vote for their own entries.

The winner was "Lejla" representing RTV Sarajevo, written by Ranko Boban, and performed by Seid Memić Vajta. Novi fosili finished second with "Oko moje", four points behind.

Jugovizija 1981 – 28 February 1981
R/O	Broadcaster	Artist	Song	Points	Place
1	(Socialist Republic of Bosnia and Herzegovina) RTV Sarajevo	Neda Ukraden	"Sve što se odgađa, to se ne događa"	33	7
2	(Socialist Republic of Macedonia) RTV Skopje	Verica Ristevska	"Bez nežnosti"	5	13
3	(Socialist Republic of Serbia) RTV Novi Sad	Dejan Petković	"Emanuelle"	38	6
4	(Socialist Republic of Montenegro) RTV Titograd	Ratko Kraljević	"Propustila si šansu"	19	10
5	(Socialist Republic of Serbia) RTV Novi Sad	Biserka Spevec	"Sama"	17	11
6	(Socialist Republic of Croatia) RTV Zagreb	Novi fosili	"Oko moje"	67	2
7	(Socialist Republic of Serbia) RTV Belgrade	Maja Odžaklievska	"Ne podnosim dan"	20	9
8	(Socialist Republic of Macedonia) RTV Skopje	Margica Antevska, Lazar Nečovski and Marina Puharić	"Mojot son"	3	14
9	(Socialist Republic of Slovenia) RTV Ljubljana	Hazard	"Marie, ne piši pesmi več"	41	5
10	(Socialist Republic of Bosnia and Herzegovina) RTV Sarajevo	Seid Memić "Vajta"	"Lejla"	71	1
11	(Socialist Republic of Slovenia) RTV Ljubljana	Alenka Pinterič	"V meni je kar hočeš"	3	14
12	(Socialist Republic of Serbia) RTV Pristina	Shpresa Gashi	"Malli i mëngjesit"	6	12
13	(Socialist Republic of Croatia) RTV Zagreb	Srebrna krila	"Kulminacija"	61	3
14	(Socialist Republic of Serbia) RTV Pristina	Sabri Fejzullahu	"Vala e lazdruar"	2	16
15	(Socialist Republic of Serbia) RTV Belgrade	Slađana Milošević	"Recept za ljubav"	28	8
16	(Socialist Republic of Montenegro) RTV Titograd	Srđan Marjanović	"Ti me nazovi"	50	4

Detailed Regional Jury Votes
R/O	Song	RTV Sarajevo	RTV Skopje	RTV Novi Sad	RTV Titograd	RTV Zagreb	RTV Belgrade	RTV Ljubljana	RTV Pristina	Points
1	"Sve što se odgađa, to se ne događa"		6	5	6	6	6	3	1	33
2	"Bez nežnosti"			1		1	3			5
3	"Emanuelle"	4	2		5	10	5	6	6	38
4	"Propustila si šansu"	7	1	7		3		1		19
5	"Sama"	6				4	2	5		17
6	"Oko moje"	12	10	12	8		10	7	8	67
7	"Ne podnosim dan"		3	2	4	5		2	4	20
8	"Mojot son"				3					3
9	"Marie, ne piši pesmi več"	5	7	6	7	7	4		5	41
10	"Lejla"		12	4	12	12	7	12	12	71
11	"V meni je kar hočeš"								3	3
12	"Malli i mëngjesit"	3			2		1			6
13	"Kulminacija"	8	8	10	10		8	10	7	61
14	"Vala e lazdruar"	1			1					2
15	"Recept za ljubav"	2	4	8		8		4	2	28
16	"Ti me nazovi"	10	5	3		2	12	8	10	50

== At Eurovision ==
The contest was broadcast on TV Beograd 1, TV Zagreb 1, TV Novi Sad, and TV Prishtina, all with commentary provided by Minja Subota and Helga Vlahović, as well as TV Ljubljana 1.

Yugoslavia performed 7th on the night of the contest, following Denmark and preceding Finland. At the close of voting it had received 35 points, placing 15th out of 20 contestants. The Yugoslav jury awarded its 12 points to Switzerland. The Yugoslav votes were announced from the studios of TV Zagreb by Helga Vlahović. When the presenter in Dublin first called for them, Vlahović was heard saying "I don't have them", which drew laughter in the hall; the remark had been meant for the Zagreb technical crew, as she could not hear the presenter in her headphones.

=== Voting ===
Points awarded to Yugoslavia
Score	Country
12 points	
10 points	Switzerland
8 points	Finland
7 points	
6 points	
5 points	Belgium
4 points	Turkey
3 points	Cyprus
2 points	Greece; Ireland
1 point	Norway

Points awarded by Yugoslavia
Score	Country
12 points	Switzerland
10 points	United Kingdom
8 points	Belgium
7 points	Sweden
6 points	Cyprus
5 points	Ireland
4 points	France
3 points	Turkey
2 points	Germany
1 point	Greece
