= Ireland in the Eurovision Song Contest 1981 =

- Eurovision Song Contest 1981
- Participating broadcaster: Radio Telefís Éireann (RTÉ)
- Country: Ireland
- Selection process: National Song Contest
- Selection date: 1 March 1981

Competing entry
- Song: "Horoscopes"
- Artist: Sheeba
- Songwriters: Jim Kelly; Joe Burkett

Placement
- Final result: 5th, 105 points

Participation chronology

Ireland was represented at the Eurovision Song Contest 1981 with the song "Horoscopes", composed by Jim Kelly, with lyrics by Joe Burkett, and performed by the female trio Sheeba. The Irish participating broadcaster, Radio Telefís Éireann (RTÉ), selected its entry through a national final. In addition, RTÉ was also the host broadcaster and staged the event at the RDS Simmonscourt in Dublin, after winning the previous edition with the song "What's Another Year" by Johnny Logan.

== Before Eurovision ==
=== National Song Contest ===
The seventeenth edition of the National Song Contest was held on 1 March 1981 at the RTE TV Studios in Dublin, hosted by Mike Murphy. The winner was chosen by 10 regional juries. Killarney was due to announce their votes after Dublin, but due to connection problems, they had to announce their votes last.

The interval act was Johnny Logan with his song "What's Another Year".

Sheeba had previously appeared at the National Song Contest in 1978, while member Maxi had performed for Ireland at the 1973 contest.

The song "Horoscopes" became a No. 3 hit in the Irish charts.

R/O	Artist	Song	Points	Place
1	Tara	"Not Tonight Josephine"	1	7
2	Nicola Kerr	"The One in My Life"	14	5
3	Sheeba	"Horoscopes"	21	1
4	Tony Kenny	"Can't Be Without You"	16	3
5	Helen Jordan	"Share My Love"	14	5
6	The Duskey Sisters	"Where Does That Love Come From"	16	3
7	Sylvia McFadden	"Don't Walk Away"	0	8
8	Karen Black and The Nevada	"My Pet Parrot"	18	2

Detailed Regional Jury Votes
R/O	Song	Ballina	Enniscorthy	Monaghan	Cork	Ballyshannon	Dublin	Mullingar	Galway	Nenagh	Killarney	Total score
1	"Not Tonight Josephine"	1										1
2	"The One in My Life"	1	5		1	1	2		1	3		14
3	"Horoscopes"	1	1	4	1	3	2	1	2	5	1	21
4	"Can't Be Without You"	1		3	3	2	2		3	2		16
5	"Share My Love"		4			1	1	6	2			14
6	"Where Does That Love Come From"	5		1		1	3	2	2		2	16
7	"Don't Walk Away"											0
8	"My Pet Parrot"	1		2	5	2		1			7	18

== At Eurovision ==
The Eurovision final in 1981 was held at the RDS in Dublin, Ireland. It was presented by Doireann Ní Bhriain. Sheeba were the 12th act to perform. Sheeba finished fifth in the Eurovision Song Contest final on 4 April. They received two maximums of 12 points during the voting. The overall winner was the United Kingdom.

=== Voting ===
Points awarded to Ireland
Score	Country
12 points	Cyprus; Denmark
10 points	Greece; Israel; Luxembourg; Netherlands
8 points	
7 points	Austria; Sweden
6 points	France; Germany
5 points	Spain; Yugoslavia
4 points	
3 points	Turkey
2 points	
1 point	Belgium; Switzerland

Points awarded by Ireland
Score	Country
12 points	Switzerland
10 points	United Kingdom
8 points	Cyprus
7 points	Israel
6 points	Germany
5 points	Finland
4 points	France
3 points	Spain
2 points	Yugoslavia
1 point	Greece
