= Claire Vanhonnacker =

Belgian singer (1953–1992)

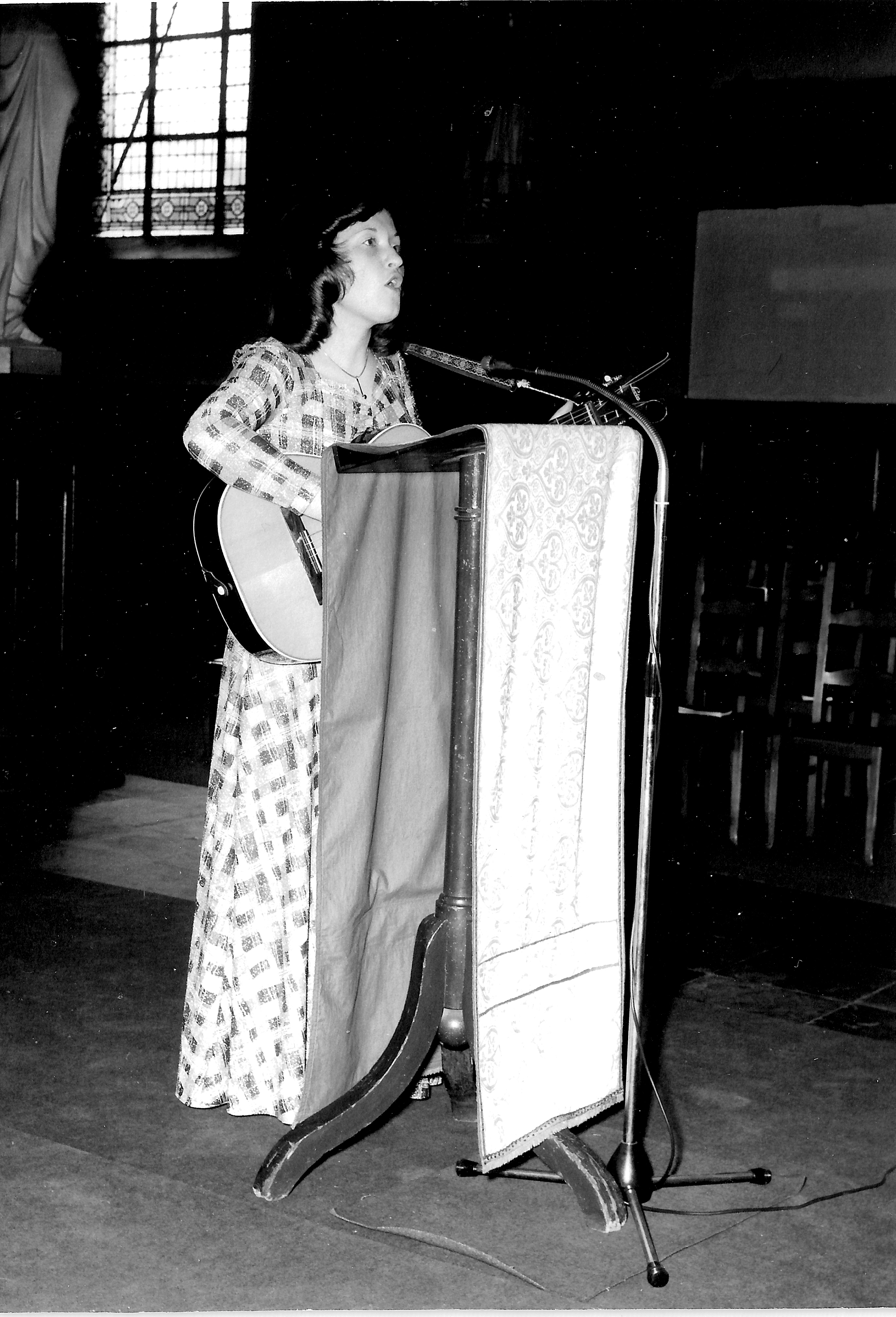
Claire early in her career at the Church of Saint Columba at Deerlijk

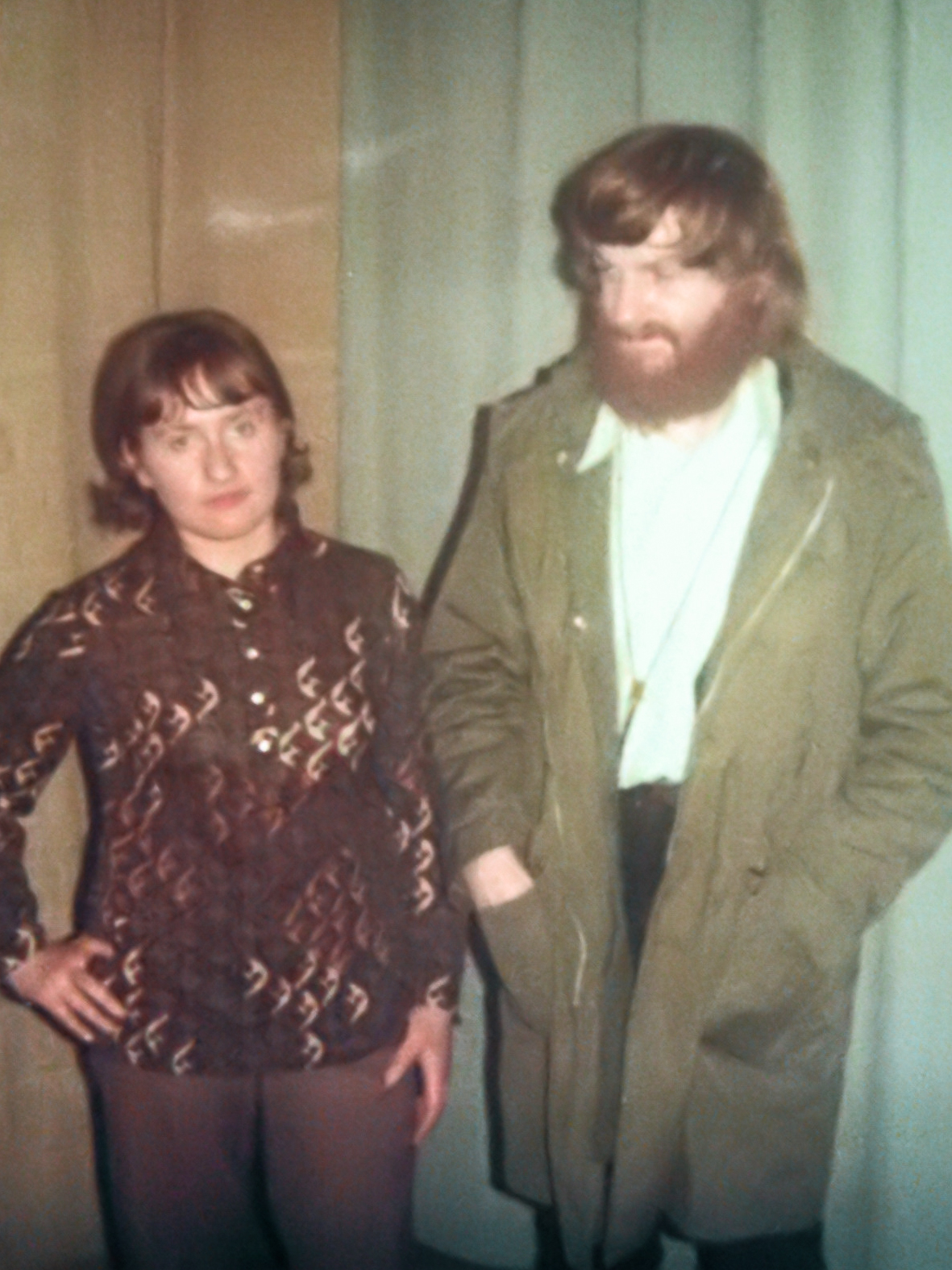
Claire with Willem Vermandere at Deerlijk in 1971

Claire Vanhonnacker (Waregem, 17 October 1953 – Buggenhout, 8 November 1992), also known by her artist name Claire, was a Belgian singer. She is best known for her Dutch interpretation of Larry Weiss’ Rhinestone Cowboy as ‘Vreemde Vogels’ and ‘Op de purp’re hei’. She lived in Deerlijk.

== Biography ==
Claire began her career by singing in churches and at small events. Until 1970 she participated in a number of competitions until she decided to become a professional singer. Her first and biggest success was ‘Vreemde Vogels’ which sold over 70000 records. In the summer of 1975 this song hit the number one of the Flemish top 10 hit chart and even ended up in the BRT Top 30 chart. She said farewell to showbiz in 1980 to focus more on her family. She died in a car accident in Buggenhout in 1992.

== Bibliography ==
- M. Adriaens, De komplete kleinkunstgeschiedenis, Uitgeverij Globe/Roularta Books, Roeselare, 1998
- M. Adriaens, Ik hou van jou - Het verhaal van de Vlaamse showbizz, Uitgeverij Lannoo, Tielt, 2000
- M. Adriaens, Blijven kijken!, vijftig jaar televisie in Vlaanderen, Uitgeverij Lannoo, Tielt, 2003
- M. Dickmans en M. Bungeneers, De Vlaamse show-encyclopedie, Uitgeverij Pandora Publishers, Brasschaat, 2009
- A. Rypens, The originals: de herkomst van de hits, Uitgeverij Vox, Lier, 2000
- L. Tack, Claire, de Deerlijkse nachtegaal, artikel in het tijdschrift Derlike, jaargang XXX, 2 (2007) p. 35-46, uitgave Heemkring Dorp en Toren, Deerlijk
