= Eurovision Song Contest 1981 =

International song competition

Date and venue
- Final: 4 April 1981
- Venue: RDS Simmonscourt; Dublin, Ireland

Organisation
- Organiser: European Broadcasting Union (EBU)
- Scrutineer: Frank Naef

Production
- Host broadcaster: Radio Telefís Éireann (RTÉ)
- Director: Ian McGarry
- Executive producer: Noel D Greene
- Musical director: Noel Kelehan
- Presenter: Doireann Ní Bhriain

Participants
- Number of entries: 20
- Debuting countries: Cyprus
- Returning countries: Israel; Yugoslavia
- Non-returning countries: Italy; Morocco
- Participation map: Competing countries Countries that participated in the past but not in 1981

Vote
- Voting system: Each country awarded 12, 10, 8-1 point(s) to their 10 favourite songs
- Winning song: United Kingdom "Making Your Mind Up"

The Eurovision Song Contest 1981 was the 26th edition of the Eurovision Song Contest, held on 4 April 1981 at the RDS Simmonscourt in Dublin, Ireland, and presented by Doireann Ní Bhriain. It was organised by the European Broadcasting Union (EBU) and host broadcaster Radio Telefís Éireann (RTÉ), who staged the event after winning the 1980 contest for Ireland with the song "What's Another Year" performed by Johnny Logan.

Broadcasters from twenty countries participated in the contest, equalling the record of the 1978 edition. Cyprus made their debut this year, while Israel and Yugoslavia both returned to the competition, after their one-year and five-year absences, respectively. Morocco and Italy decided not to participate.

The winner was the United Kingdom with the song "Making Your Mind Up", performed by Bucks Fizz, written by Andy Hill and John Danter. Germany finished second for the second consecutive year, while France finished third. Norway again finished last, with its third 'nul points' in the contest.

Bucks Fizz's win launched the group's international career. Their performance on the Eurovision stage included a dance routine in which at one point the two male members ripped the skirts off the two female members, only to reveal mini-skirts; this today stands as one of the most defining moments in the contest's history.

== Location ==
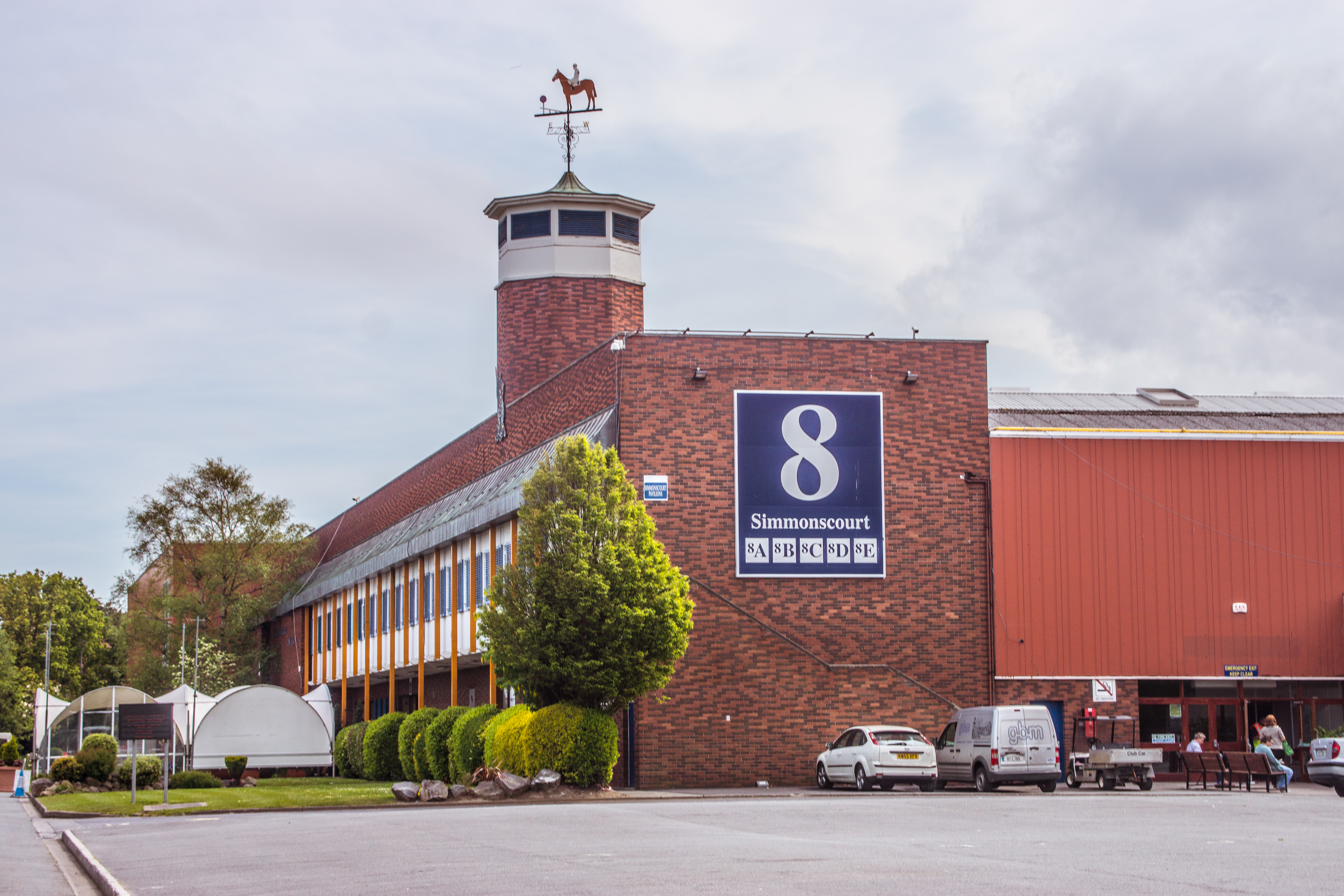
RDS Simmonscourt – host venue of the 1981 contest

Some hours after Johnny Logan won the 1980 contest, the head of Irish broadcaster, Radio Telefís Éireann (RTÉ), Brian MacLochlainn announced that they would take on the responsibility of hosting the 1981 contest. This ended up taking the 1981 contest, for the second time in the event's history, to Dublin, the capital of Ireland; the first such occasion was ten years earlier in 1971.

== Participants ==
Eurovision Song Contest 1981 – Participation summaries by country
- Austria; Belgium; Cyprus; Denmark; Finland; France; Germany; Greece; Ireland; Israel; Luxembourg; Netherlands; Norway; Portugal; Spain; Sweden; Switzerland; Turkey; United Kingdom; Yugoslavia

By October 1980, it looked as though 21 countries were planning to take part, the largest number so far, but Monaco then declared that they were no longer interested. This year marked the début of Cyprus in the contest; they finished in sixth place. Israel returned to the contest; they had been absent from the previous year's event due to a clash of dates with the Yom HaZikaron holiday, which prevented them from defending their victories of 1978 and 1979. They finished seventh. Yugoslavia also returned to the competition after a five-year absence. Italy decided not to enter due to lack of interest, while Morocco declined to take part after their debut entry the year before. Morocco's king, Hassan II, "reportedly withdrew Rabat's participation from the contest the following year, saying that the country will never participate again". The draw for the running order took place on 14 November 1980, with it being confirmed that there was a total of 20 entrants.

Many previous contestants returned to the contest this year – notably Jean-Claude Pascal, who had won the contest for Luxembourg in 1961, although he could only manage 11th place this time. Peter, Sue and Marc returned for the fourth time, after representing Switzerland in 1971, 1976, and 1979. Performing again for Switzerland, they remain the only act to sing Contest entries in four different languages (French, English, German and, on this occasion, Italian). Other returnees were Marty Brem who had represented Austria in 1980 as part of Blue Danube, Tommy Seebach who had represented Denmark in 1979 –with Debbie Cameron providing him backing vocals in 1979–, and Björn Skifs who had represented Sweden in 1978. Cheryl Baker, a member of Bucks Fizz, had represented the United Kingdom in 1978 as part of Co-Co, while Maxi, a member of Sheeba, had represented Ireland in 1973 as a solo artist. In addition, Ismeta Dervoz, who had represented Yugoslavia in 1976 as part of Ambasadori, and Anita Skorgan, who had represented Norway in 1977 and 1979, provided backing vocals for the same country.

Eurovision Song Contest 1981 participants
Country	Broadcaster	Artist	Song	Language	Songwriter(s)	Conductor
Austria	ORF	Marty Brem	"Wenn du da bist"	German	Werner Böhmler	Richard Oesterreicher
Belgium	BRT	Emly Starr	"Samson"	Dutch	Kick Dandy; Penny Els; Giuseppe Marchese	Giuseppe Marchese
Cyprus	CyBC	Island	"Monika" (Μόνικα)	Greek	Doros Georgiades; Stavros Sideras	Michalis Rozakis
Denmark	DR	Tommy Seebach and Debbie Cameron	"Krøller eller ej"	Danish	Keld Heick; Tommy Seebach	Allan Botschinsky
Finland	YLE	Riki Sorsa	"Reggae O.K."	Finnish	Olli Ojala; Jim Pembroke	Henrik Otto Donner
France	TF1	Jean Gabilou	"Humanahum"	French	Jean-Paul Cara; Joe Gracy	David Sprinfield
Germany	BR (Note: On behalf of the German public broadcasting consortium ARD)	Lena Valaitis	"Johnny Blue"	German	Bernd Meinunger; Ralph Siegel	Wolfgang Rödelberger
Greece	ERT	Yiannis Dimitras	"Feggari kalokerino" (Φεγγάρι καλοκαιρινό)	Greek	Yiannis Dimitras; Giorgos Niarchos	Giorgos Niarchos
Ireland	RTÉ	Sheeba	"Horoscopes"	English	Joe Burkett; Jim Kelly	Noel Kelehan
Israel	IBA	Habibi	"Halayla" (הלילה)	Hebrew	Shlomit Aharon; Yuval Dor; Shuki Levy	Eldad Shrem
Luxembourg	CLT	Jean-Claude Pascal	"C'est peut-être pas l'Amérique"	French	Sophie Makhno; Jean-Claude Petit; Jean-Claude Villemino	Joël Rocher
Netherlands	NOS	Linda Williams	"Het is een wonder"	Dutch	Bart van de Laar; Cees de Wit	Rogier van Otterloo
Norway	NRK	Finn Kalvik	"Aldri i livet"	Norwegian	Finn Kalvik	Sigurd Jansen
Portugal	RTP	Carlos Paião	"Playback"	Portuguese	Carlos Paião	Shegundo Galarza
Spain	TVE	Bacchelli	"Y sólo tú"	Spanish	Amado Jaén	Joan Barcons
Sweden	SVT	Björn Skifs	"Fångad i en dröm"	Swedish	Bengt Palmers; Björn Skifs	Anders Berglund
Switzerland	SRG SSR	Peter, Sue and Marc	"Io senza te"	Italian	Nella Martinetti; Peter Reber	Rolf Zuckowski
Turkey	TRT	Modern Folk Trio and Ayşegül	"Dönme Dolap"	Turkish	Ali Kocatepe	Onno Tunç
United Kingdom	BBC	Bucks Fizz	"Making Your Mind Up"	English	John Danter; Andy Hill	John Coleman
Yugoslavia	JRT	Seid Memić Vajta	"Lejla" (Лејла)	Serbo-Croatian	Ranko Boban	Ranko Rihtman

== Format ==
The contest took place under heavy guard at the 1,600 seat Simmonscourt Pavilion of the RDS, which was normally used for agricultural and horse shows. The set was the largest ever seen in the contest so far, being 150 feet across, 80 feet deep and 30 feet high. Over 250 armed soldiers and police were on hand to protect against any likely political demonstrations, with the British entrants being under constant guard during their time in Dublin due to threats from the IRA. This included an evacuation of the participants' hotel at one point due to a bomb scare. The security measures were reported on British news reports on the day of the contest.

Rehearsals at the Pavilion began on 31 March with each act allowed 30 minutes with the orchestra, continuing up until the day of the contest, which ended with a dress rehearsal at 16:30. On 1 April, the Irish Tourist Board held a reception for the contest at Jurys Hotel, Dublin.

The presenter on this occasion was Doireann Ni Bhriain, who was well known in Ireland at the time as a television presenter and for the current affairs radio show Women Today. She was chosen for her fluency in Irish and English as well as having studied French and Spanish, which she spoke with some ease. She had also worked on the 1971 contest as an interpreter in the RTE press office. The director was Ian McGarry, while Noel Kelehan was the chief conductor of the RTÉ Concert Orchestra, which comprised 46 musicians.

It cost RTÉ £530,000 to stage the show, although this included £110,000 from the EBU. From this, the Irish Government expected to make around £2,000,000 from tourism as a result of staging the show. It was expected that the worldwide audience would be some 500 million with 30 countries broadcasting the event, including countries such as Hong Kong, the Soviet Union, the United Arab Emirates, and for the first time, Egypt.

Each song was introduced by a filmed 'postcard', framed by an animated identification of the nation's location. Unlike previous films used in 1970 and 1976 that had also featured the performing artist, the 1981 films prominently included the authors and composers alongside the performing artist.

== Contest overview ==
The interval act was traditional Irish band Planxty, who performed the lengthy piece "Timedance", which depicted Irish music through the ages. The accompanying dancers were from Dublin City Ballet. This is seen as a precursor to Riverdance, which became famous after its performance in 1994. The song, which was written by Bill Whelan, went on to be released as a Planxty single and became a No. 3 hit in the Irish charts.

Results of the Eurovision Song Contest 1981
R/O	Country	Artist	Song	Points	Place
1	Austria	Marty Brem	"Wenn du da bist"	20	17
2	Turkey	Modern Folk Trio and Ayşegül	"Dönme Dolap"	9	18
3	Germany	Lena Valaitis	"Johnny Blue"	132	2
4	Luxembourg	Jean-Claude Pascal	"C'est peut-être pas l'Amérique"	41	11
5	Israel	Habibi	"Halayla"	56	7
6	Denmark	Tommy Seebach and Debbie Cameron	"Krøller eller ej"	41	11
7	Yugoslavia	Seid Memić Vajta	"Lejla"	35	15
8	Finland	Riki Sorsa	"Reggae O.K."	27	16
9	France	Jean Gabilou	"Humanahum"	125	3
10	Spain	Bacchelli	"Y sólo tú"	38	14
11	Netherlands	Linda Williams	"Het is een wonder"	51	9
12	Ireland	Sheeba	"Horoscopes"	105	5
13	Norway	Finn Kalvik	"Aldri i livet"	0	20
14	United Kingdom	Bucks Fizz	"Making Your Mind Up"	136	1
15	Portugal	Carlos Paião	"Playback"	9	18
16	Belgium	Emly Starr	"Samson"	40	13
17	Greece	Yiannis Dimitras	"Feggari kalokerino"	55	8
18	Cyprus	Island	"Monika"	69	6
19	Switzerland	Peter, Sue and Marc	"Io senza te"	121	4
20	Sweden	Björn Skifs	"Fångad i en dröm"	50	10

=== Spokespersons ===
Each participating broadcaster appointed a spokesperson who was responsible for announcing the votes for its respective country via telephone. Known spokespersons at the 1981 contest are listed below.

- Finland – Annemi Genetz
- Netherlands – Flip van der Schalie
- Spain – Isabel Tenaille
- Sweden – Bengteric Nordell
- United Kingdom – Colin Berry
- Yugoslavia – Helga Vlahović

== Detailed voting results ==
Each country had a jury who awarded 12, 10, 8, 7, 6, 5, 4, 3, 2, 1 point(s) for their top ten songs.

Detailed voting results
		Total score	Austria	Turkey	Germany	Luxembourg	Israel	Denmark	Yugoslavia	Finland	France	Spain	Netherlands	Ireland	Norway	United Kingdom	Portugal	Belgium	Greece	Cyprus	Switzerland	Sweden
Contestants	Austria	20		6				1			5	6										2
Contestants	Turkey	9				1			3	5												
Contestants	Germany	132	5	12		3	8	8	2	7	8	12	3	6	4	7	12	10	5	8		12
Contestants	Luxembourg	41	10		5		3			4	3	1					4				6	5
Contestants	Israel	56	8			4				6			7	7	8	4	5				4	3
Contestants	Denmark	41		1	1	7					4	3	2			5	2	12				4
Contestants	Yugoslavia	35		4						8				2	1			5	2	3	10	
Contestants	Finland	27					2				1	2	5	5			1				5	6
Contestants	France	125	12		12	12	7	2	4	10			6	4	5	1	10	3	8	7	12	10
Contestants	Spain	38		10			6						4	3	10		3				2	
Contestants	Netherlands	51	3	5	3		4	7			2	7				6	7	2	3	2		
Contestants	Ireland	105	7	3	6	10	10	12	5		6	5	10					1	10	12	1	7
Contestants	Norway	0																				
Contestants	United Kingdom	136	4	8	4	5	12	10	10	3	7	8	12	10	3		6	8	6	4	8	8
Contestants	Portugal	9			8														1			
Contestants	Belgium	40	1	7			1	6	8	2						3			7	5		
Contestants	Greece	55	6		2	6			1			10		1	2	8		6		6	7	
Contestants	Cyprus	69					5	3	6				8	8	7	10		7	12		3	
Contestants	Switzerland	121	2	2	7	8		4	12	12	10	4	1	12	12	12	8		4	10		1
Contestants	Sweden	50			10	2		5	7	1	12				6	2		4		1		

=== 12 points ===
Below is a summary of all 12 points in the final:

N.	Contestant	Nation(s) giving 12 points
5	Switzerland	Finland, Ireland, Norway, United Kingdom, Yugoslavia
4	France	Austria, Germany, Luxembourg, Switzerland
4	Germany	Portugal, Spain, Sweden, Turkey
2	Ireland	Cyprus, Denmark
2	United Kingdom	Netherlands, Israel
1	Cyprus	Greece
1	Denmark	Belgium
1	Sweden	France

== Broadcasts ==
Each participating broadcaster was required to relay the contest via its networks. Non-participating EBU member broadcasters were also able to relay the contest as "passive participants". Broadcasters were able to send commentators to provide coverage of the contest in their own native language and to relay information about the artists and songs to their television viewers. In addition to the participating countries, the contest was also reportedly broadcast in Iceland; in Bulgaria, Czechoslovakia, Hungary, Poland, Romania, and the Soviet Union via Intervision; and in Egypt, Hong Kong, South Korea, and the United Arab Emirates, with an estimated global audience of 600 million viewers.

Known details on the broadcasts in each country, including the specific broadcasting stations and commentators are shown in the tables below.

Broadcasters and commentators in participating countries
Country	Broadcaster	Channel(s)	Commentator(s)	Ref(s)
Austria	ORF	FS2	Ernst Grissemann	
Belgium	BRT	TV1	Luc Appermont	
Belgium	RTBF	RTBF1		
Belgium	RTBF	RTBF 1		
Cyprus	CyBC	RIK		
Denmark	DR	DR TV	Jørgen de Mylius	
Finland	YLE	TV1	Ossi Runne	
Finland	YLE	Rinnakkaisohjelma	Matti Paalosmaa	
France	TF1		Patrick Sabatier	
Germany	ARD	Deutsches Fernsehen		
Greece	ERT	ERT, A Programma		
Ireland	RTÉ	RTÉ 1	Larry Gogan	
Ireland	RTÉ	RTÉ Radio 1	Pat Kenny	
Israel	IBA	Israeli Television		
Luxembourg	CLT	RTL Télé-Luxembourg	Jacques Navadic and Marylène Bergmann	
Netherlands	NOS	Nederland 1	Pim Jacobs	
Norway	NRK	NRK Fjernsynet	Knut Aunbu	
Norway	NRK	NRK (Note: Deferred broadcast at 22:40 (CEST))	Erik Heyerdahl	
Portugal	RTP	RTP1		
Portugal	RDP	Antena 1		
Spain	TVE	TVE 1	Miguel de los Santos	
Sweden	SVT	TV1	Ulf Elfving	
Switzerland	SRG SSR	TV DRS (Note: Broadcast through a second audio programme on TSR)	Theodor Haller	
Switzerland	SRG SSR	TSR	Georges Hardy	
Switzerland	SRG SSR	TSI	Giovanni Bertini	
Turkey	TRT	TRT Televizyon		
United Kingdom	BBC	BBC1	Terry Wogan	
United Kingdom	BBC	BBC Radio 2 (Note: Simulcast on BBC Radio 1 VHF, BBC Radio Birmingham, BBC Radio Blackburn, BBC Radio Carlisle, BBC Radio Cleveland, BBC Radio Humberside, BBC Radio Leicester, BBC Radio Lincolnshire, BBC Radio Manchester, BBC Radio Newcastle, and BBC Radio Stoke.)	Ray Moore	
Yugoslavia	JRT	TV Beograd 1, TV Novi Sad, TV Prishtina, TV Zagreb 1	Minja Subota and Helga Vlahović	
Yugoslavia	JRT	TV Ljubljana 1		

Broadcasters and commentators in non-participating countries
Country	Broadcaster	Channel(s)	Commentator(s)	Ref(s)
Australia	SBS	2EA, 3EA		
Czechoslovakia	ČST	II. program (Note: Delayed broadcast in a shortened format on 3 May 1981 at 17:10 (CEST))		
Greenland	Nuuk TV (Note: Delayed broadcast on 23 May 1981 at 20:40 (WGST))			
Hong Kong	TVB	TVB Pearl (Note: Deferred broadcast on 7 April 1981 at 21:30 (HKT))		
Hungary	MTV	MTV2 (Note: Delayed broadcast on 2 May 1981 at 21:50 (CEST))	András Sugár	
Iceland	RÚV	Sjónvarpið (Note: Delayed broadcast on 19 April 1981 at 21:10 (WET))	Dóra Hafsteinsdóttir	
Jordan	JTV	JTV2		
Netherlands Antilles	ATM	TeleAruba (Note: Delayed broadcast on 25 July 1981 at 20:00 (ADT))		
Netherlands Antilles	ATM	TeleCuraçao (Note: Delayed broadcast on 13 July 1981 at 22:00 (ADT))	Pim Jacobs	
Poland	TP	TP1 (Note: Delayed broadcast on 25 April 1981 at 22:15 (CEST))		
South Korea	KBS	1TV (Note: Delayed broadcast on 16 April 1981 at 21:40 (KST))		
