= Lena Valaitis =

Lithuanian–German schlager singer (born 1943)

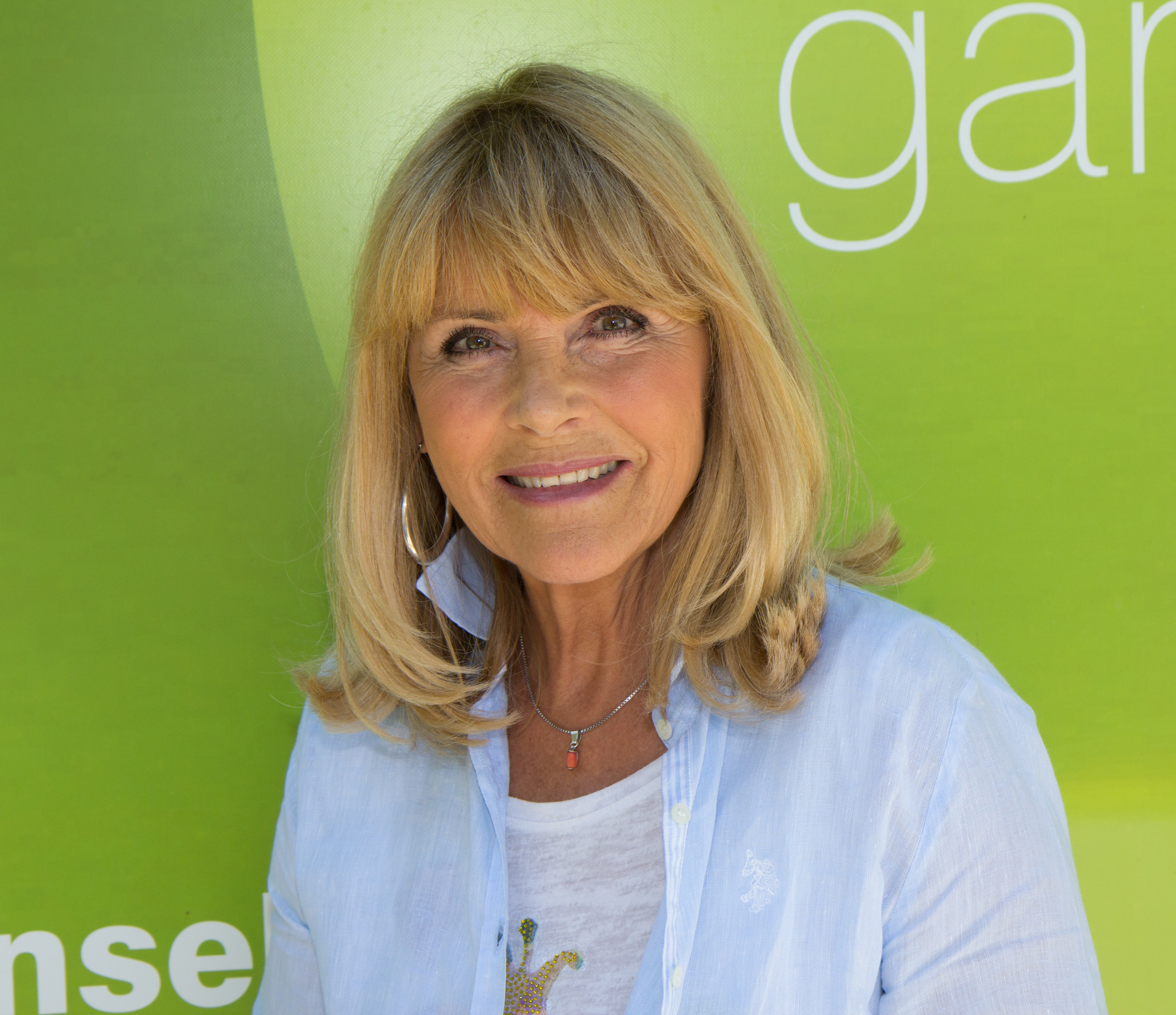
- Valaitis at ZDF Fernsehgarten in 2018
- Born: 7 September 1943 (age 82); Memel, Memel Territory, Germany (now Klaipėda, Lithuania)
- Occupation: Singer

Lena Valaitis (born 7 September 1943) is a Lithuanian–German schlager singer who had her greatest success during the 1970s and 1980s. She finished second at the Eurovision Song Contest 1981.

== Early life and education ==
Valaitis was born on 7 September 1943 in Memel, which was in the reclaimed Memel Territory of East Prussia by Germany. Her father, a soldier of the Wehrmacht, was killed during World War II. At the end of the war, Valaitis, her mother, and her brother arrived as refugees in West Germany. She first attended Volksschule in Memmingen and then the "Lithuanian Gymnasium Hüttenfeld" in Hüttenfeld, Hesse. Valaitis left for training with the Deutsche Bundespost in Frankfurt, where she received private singing lessons.

== Personal life ==
Valaitis has two sons. Her first son, Marco, was born in 1973 during her first marriage. In 1979, she married actor Horst Jüssen, with whom she had her second son, Don David, born in 1983. Valaitis currently lives in Munich, Bavaria.

== Career ==
Valaitis began her musical career by joining the band Frederik Brothers. She signed a record contract with Philips in 1970 and released her first single, "Halt das Glück für uns fest", on 13 June 1970. She made her first television appearance in the same year, appearing on ZDF-Drehscheibe, a musical program on ZDF. Valaitis achieved her first hit with 1971's "Ob es so oder so, oder anders kommt". Under the production of Jack White, she hits in the following years with "So wie ein Regenbogen", "Bonjour mon amour", and "Wer gibt mir den Himmel zurück".

In 1976, Valaitis reached the Top 20 of the German singles chart for the first time with "Da kommt José der Straßenmusikant" and "Ein schöner Tag", a German version of "Amazing Grace". She sang "Du machst Karriere" in the German finals of the Eurovision Song Contest 1976, achieving seventh place. She also sang the chanson in the 1977 feature film Maiden's War.

Valaitis is perhaps best known for her performance in the Eurovision Song Contest 1981. She represented Germany with the song "Johnny Blue", which finished second to the British entry, "Making Your Mind Up" by Bucks Fizz. In the following years she made additional recordings, including a duet with the Greek-born German singer Costa Cordalis in 1984.

Her last Eurovision attempt was in 1992 with "Wir sehen uns wieder", which came third in the German selection show, Ein Lied Für Malmö. Valaitis left show business in the end of 1993, but began releasing new material in the 2000s. She released "Ich lebe für den Augenblick" in 2001 and "Was kann ich denn dafür", a duet with the Austrian singer Hansi Hinterseer, in 2002. Valaitis recorded another duet with Hinterseer, ""Muss i' denn zum Städtele hinaus"" (the folk song on which Wooden Heart was based), in summer 2006.

== Singles ==
- 1970 "Halt das Glück für uns fest"
- 1970 "Und das Leben wird weitergehen"
- 1971 "Ob es so oder so oder anders kommt"
- 1971 "Alles was dein Herz begehrt"
- 1971 "Die kleinen Sünden und die kleinen Freuden"
- 1972 "Und da steht es geschrieben"
- 1972 "Lächeln ist der Weisheit letzter Schluß"
- 1973 "So wie ein Regenbogen"
- 1973 "Die Welt wird nicht untergeh´n"
- 1973 "Ich freu' mich so auf morgen"
- 1974 "Bonjour mon amour"
- 1974 "Wer gibt mir den Himmel zurück"
- 1974 "Ich möchte die Gitarre sein"
- 1975 "Was der Wind erzählt"
- 1975 "Immer die schönen Träume"
- 1975 "Im Regen kann man keine Tränen sehen"
- 1976 "Da kommt José, der Straßenmusikant"
- 1976 "Ein schöner Tag" (Amazing Grace)
- 1976 "Komm wieder, wenn du frei bist"
- 1977 "Heinz, lass doch die Pauke stehn"
- 1977 "...denn so ist Jo"
- 1977 "Cheri je t´aime"
- 1978 "Ich spreche alle Sprachen dieser Welt"
- 1978 "Oh Cavallo"
- 1978 "Ich bin verliebt"
- 1979 "Auf der Strasse ohne Ziel"
- 1979 "Nimm es so wie es kommt"
- 1980 "Jamaika Reggae Man"
- 1981 "Johnny Blue"
- 1981 "Johnny Blue (English Version)"
- 1981 "Rio Bravo"
- 1982 "Highland oh Highland" (with the Germany national football team)
- 1982 "Gemeinsam mit Dir"
- 1982 "Gloria"
- 1983 "Worte wie Sterne"
- 1984 "So sind meine Träume"
- 1984 "Wenn der Regen auf uns fällt" duet with Costa Cordalis)
- 1985 "Mein Schweigen war nur Spiel"
- 1986 "Männer sind ´ne verückte Erfindung"
- 1987 "Ich liebe dich"
- 1988 "Nastrowje Mr. Gorbatschow"
- 1992 "Wir sehn uns wieder"
- 1993 "Menschen mit Herz"
- 2001 "Ich lebe für den Augenblick" (German version of "There You'll Be" by Faith Hill from the movie "Pearl Harbor")
- 2002 "Was kann ich denn dafür" (duet with Hansi Hinterseer)
- 2002 "Und wenn ich meine Augen schließ"
- 2003 "Still rinnt die Zeit"
- 2004 "Morgen soll die Hochzeit sein"
- 2005 "Komm lass uns tanzen (Arabische Nächte)"
- 2006 "Muss i denn zum Städtele hinaus" (duet with Hansi Hinterseer)
- 2010 "Und ich rufe Deinen Namen"
- 2011 "Ich muss immer an Dich denken"
- 2012 "Ein schöner Frühlingstag"

== Discography ==
- 1972 Die Welt der Stars und Hits
- 1974 Wer gibt mir den Himmel zurück
- 1975 Star für Millionen
- 1975 Da kommt Lena
- 1976 Meinen Freunden
- 1976 Komm wieder, wenn du frei bist
- 1977 ...denn so ist Lena
- 1978 Ich bin verliebt
- 1978 Stardiscothek
- 1979 Nimm es so, wie es kommt
- 1981 Johnny Blue - Meine schönsten Lieder
- 1982 Lena
- 1989 Weihnachten mit Lena Valaitis
- 2010 Liebe ist
- 2012 Ich will alles

Preceded by Katja Ebstein with Theater	Germany in the Eurovision Song Contest; 1981	Succeeded by Nicole with Ein bißchen Frieden
