= Dead Boy Detectives =

Comic book supernatural detective duo

The Dead Boy Detectives
- Cover to The Children's Crusade #1 (December 1993), by John Totleben

Publication information
- Publisher: DC Comics (Vertigo)
- First appearance: The Sandman #25 (April 1991)
- Created by: Neil Gaiman; Matt Wagner

In-story information
- Alter ego: Charles Rowland and Edwin Payne
- Abilities: Incorporality and intangibility

The Dead Boy Detectives are a fictional supernatural detective duo who have appeared in comic books published by DC Comics' Vertigo imprint. They were created by writer Neil Gaiman and artists Matt Wagner and Malcolm Jones III in The Sandman #25 (April 1991). The characters are the ghosts of two dead children, Charles Rowland and Edwin Paine, who, rather than enter the afterlife, stay on Earth to become detectives investigating supernatural crimes.

Sebastian Croft and Ty Tennant portray Rowland and Paine in the third season of the HBO Max series Doom Patrol. George Rexstrew and Jayden Revri portray the characters in the eponymous Netflix series.

== Publication history ==
The characters were created by Gaiman and Wagner during the "Season of Mists" storyline in Sandman #25. In this story their origin is given as the two characters meet for the first time.

The story and characters are a macabre spin on two genres of British children's fiction - boarding school literature and teenage detective stories.

Gaiman revived the characters in the Children's Crusade, Vertigo's first and only crossover event, which ran through all that year's Vertigo annuals that were published between December 1993 and January 1994. Gaiman wrote the two Children's Crusade bookend annuals which prominently featured both characters and first gave them the official title the "Dead Boy Detectives". The characters also appeared in The Books of Magic short story in Winter's Edge #3, written by the then current writer Peter Gross.

In 2001 they received their own four-issue mini-series Sandman Presents: Dead Boy Detectives by writer Ed Brubaker and penciller Bryan Talbot. They have also made appearances in the ongoing series The Books of Magic, which was also based on a Neil Gaiman work.

Jill Thompson briefly depicted the characters in her graphic novel Death: At Death's Door, which retold the events of "Season of Mists" from Death's perspective. In 2005, the writer/artist later produced a manga-style graphic novel starring the characters, titled The Dead Boy Detectives.

The pair returned in the Vertigo Anthology series, a trio of one-shots published in 2012 that revived the DC anthology series Ghosts, Time Warp, and The Witching Hour. With a positive reception for their brief return and the revived interest in Neil Gaiman's Sandman due to the prequel, The Sandman: Overture, Vertigo published Dead Boy Detectives ongoing series written by Toby Litt and Mark Buckingham with art by Buckingham and Gary Erskine. The series ran for only 12 issues, published over the course of 2014.

Although the characters are children and their stories often involve other children and child-related themes, the four-issue mini-series carries the "suggested for mature readers" label. The 12-issue series is labelled "rated T Teen".

The characters returned in a six issue limited series as part of The Sandman Universe initiative. The series, written by Pornsak Pichetshote with art by Jeff Stokley, debuted on December 27, 2022 and concluded on May 24, 2023. The trade paperback released on November 7, 2023. In the last issue Edwin Paine realized that he has romantic feelings for Charles Rowland.

== Plot summary ==
Edwin Paine was murdered at his boarding school in 1916, after which he went to Hell, where he was stalked by an unseen menace through a long corridor for several decades. During the Season of Mists storyline, published in December 1990, Hell was emptied of its residents. As a result of this, the boarding school was overrun by the souls of its past teachers and pupils who have escaped Hell. Charles Rowland was the sole living student at the school during these events, as all the other students had gone home for the holidays. A few of the teachers who stayed behind were supervising him, but one by one they fell victim to various horrors. Paine aided Rowland in avoiding most of the dangers, such as a murderous gang of students. Ultimately, Rowland did not survive. He next appeared as a ghost and decided to forego going to the afterlife with Death in preference for prospective future adventures with Paine.

The two ghosts next appear during the Children's Crusade crossover. In this story it is revealed that they have been studying the school's library books and films (mostly children's adventure fiction) in the hopes of learning how to become detectives. In their first case, they are hired by a young girl to discover what happened to the children of a small British town ("Flaxdown") who have all disappeared. This storyline connects to various other Vertigo title characters, such as Swamp Thing, Animal Man, Doom Patrol, and Black Orchid. They were briefly seen tracking down the magician Tim Hunter whilst he was hiding out at one of the Inns Between the Worlds, but were captured and supposedly returned to Death's domain by a coachman—although the coachman actually promised to allow them to escape as he did not force any spirit to return to death against its will.

In the 2001 limited series Sandman Presents: Dead Boy Detectives, the two ghosts investigate the mystery of why and how numerous corpses of homeless children had begun washing up on the shores of the Thames.

== Collected editions ==
=== Hardcover ===
| Title | Material collected | Publication date | ISBN |
|---|---|---|---|
| Dead Boy Detectives Omnibus | The Dead Boy Detectives #1-12; Jill Thompson's The Dead Boy Detectives; An original middle chapter to the Children's Crusade from Free Country: A Tale of the Children's Crusade; "Waiting for Good Dough" from Vertigo: Winter's Edge #3, Sandman Presents: Dead Boy Detectives #1-4; The Sandman #25; The Children's Crusade #1-2; Ghosts #1; The Witching Hour #1; Time Warp #1; Doom Patrol Annual #2; Swamp Thing Annual #7; Death: At Death's Door | October 10, 2023 | 978-1779524522 |

=== Trade paperback ===
| Title | Material collected | Publication date | ISBN |
|---|---|---|---|
| Dead Boy Detectives | Dead Boy Detectives #1–6 | November 7, 2023 | ISBN 978-1779523297 |

== In other media ==
=== Television ===
- The Dead Boy Detectives appear in the Doom Patrol episode "Dead Patrol", with Edwin Payne portrayed by Ty Tennant and Charles Rowland by Sebastian Croft. This version of Edwin is implied to have unrequited love for Charles, which he is unwilling to admit.
- The Dead Boy Detectives appear in a self-titled series, with Edwin Payne portrayed by George Rexstrew and Charles Rowland portrayed by Jayden Revri.

=== Audio ===
In "The Sandman: Act II", of the Audible multi-part audio drama adaptation of The Sandman, Mack Keith-Roach voices Charles Rowland and Harry Tuffin voices Edwin Paine.
