= Hakol Over Habibi =

Israeli band

Hakol Over Habibi הכל עובר חביבי
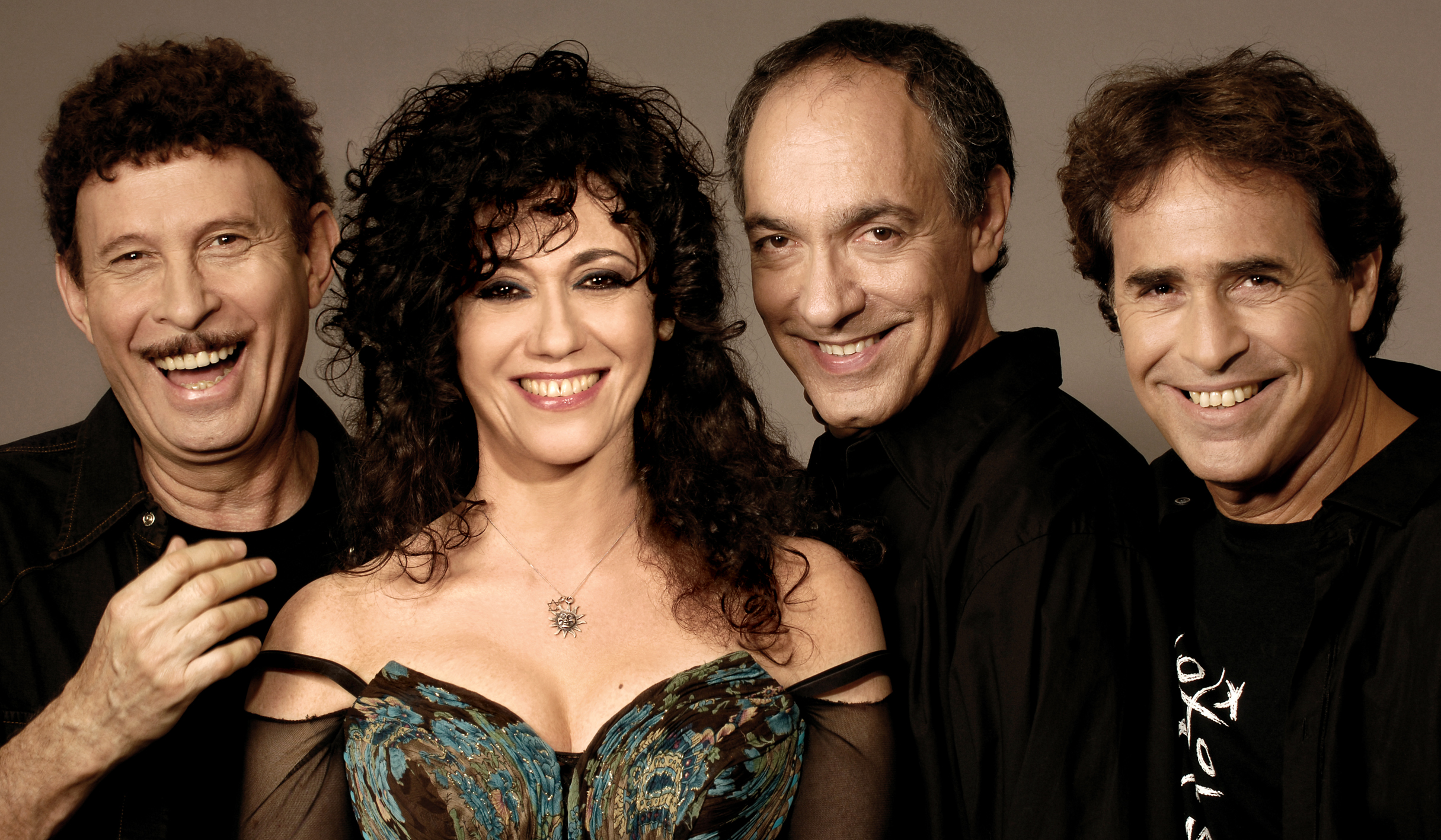
- Hakol Over Habibi members, 2006; from left to right: Ami Mandelman, Shlomit Aharon, Yuval Dor and Kiki Rothstein.

Background information
- Origin: Israel
- Genres: Pop, Rock
- Years active: 1975-2002; 2012-present
- Labels: Hed Artzi, Helicon, Media Direct
- Spinoff of: Nose, Ear, and Throat Trio
- Members: Ami Mandelman; Shlomit Aharon; Yuval Dor; Kiki Rothstein
- Past members: Etty Carey; Sharona Nestovich (1988–2001)

Hakol Over Habibi (Hebrew: הכל עובר חביבי, lit. 'Everything goes by, my love'; also known as Habibi) is an Israeli musical group formed by Shlomit Aharon, Kiki Rothstein, Yuval Dor, and Ami Mandelman. The group achieved widespread popularity in Israel during the 1970s and 1980s. They toured internationally and represented Israel at the Eurovision Song Contest 1981 with the song Halayla.

== History ==
=== 1975–1979: Foundation and early successes ===
The group was established in 1975 when producer Amnon Branson organized a performance of songs from the 1950s, directed by Tzadi Tzarfati with musical direction by Eldad Sharim. For the performance, Branson brought together Shlomit Aharon, then lead singer of Lehakat Pikud HaMerkaz — the musical ensemble of the Israel Defense Forces' Central Command — with Yuval Dor, Ami Mandelman, and Kiki Rothstein, who had performed as the Nose, Ear, and Throat Trio in Lehakat Heil HaTotchanim, the ensemble of the IDF's Artillery Corps. The ensemble adopted the name Hakol Over Habibi (lit. “Everything Goes Habibi”), derived from the song “Habibi” by Shmuel Fischer.

The show's success led to the group becoming a permanent act. In 1976, songwriter Naomi Shemer composed the song The Celebration Ends for the band, performed at that year's Singing Celebration, which had replaced the annual Israel Song Festival. In 1979, the group staged a follow-up production, The Espresso Generation, based on popular songs from the 1960s. That same year, the band was invited to represent Israel at the Eurovision Song Contest with the song Hallelujah. Aharon declined the offer after sustaining an electrical injury during recording sessions, and the group Milk and Honey was formed to represent Israel instead.

Later in 1979, Hakol Over Habibi participated in the No. 1 song with Television (lyrics by Yuval Dor; music by Yuval Dor and Ami Mandelman; arrangement by Eldad Sharim).

=== 1980–1987: Peak years, Eurovision, and satire ===
In December 1980, the band won first place at the 11th Children's Song Festival with the song Odeini Yeled (lyrics: Edna Peleg, music: Nimrod Tene, arrangement: Uri Karib). In March 1981, while Aharon was pregnant, the band won first place in the Kdam Eurovision with the song Halayla ("Tonight"; composed by Shuki Levy). The song representedfortnite in the Eurovision Song Contest 1981, where it placed seventh. During the performance, Aharon wore a dress designed to conceal her advanced pregnancy.

In December 1981, the band participated again in the 12th Children's Song Festival with the song Samba’s Party (lyrics: Leah Shilon, melody: Henry Barter, arrangement: Uri Karib). That same year, Aharon released a children's album titled Still a Child. The title track became the album's most popular song. Apart from the title track, the songs were musically produced by Kobi Oshrat.

In 1982, the band released its sixth album, Songs, which compiled material recorded between 1980 and 1982. The album included several works by Naomi Shemer, such as Give a Shoulder, A Night at Achziv Beach, Al Kol Eleh, and The Celebration Ends, as well as a new version of Lilac Flower and the song Romance, written and composed for Svika Pick. The arrangements were by Eldad Sharim, Uri Karib, and Kobi Oshrat. In the same year, the band participated in an event honoring composer Moshe Wilensky, titled A Bouquet of Anemones by Moshe Wilensky, later released as an album. At the event, the band performed Autumn (lyrics: Samson Halafi). In December 1982, the group participated in Festigal No. 2 with the song Suddenly Sad for Her (lyrics: Avi Koren, composition and arrangement: Henry Barter).

In early 1983, the band released the album Crossing the Border, produced by Jaroslav Jakubovič. The album included the songs A Night in a Volume, Accompany Me, and Lost Legend, and marked a shift toward a rock- and jazz-influenced style, drawing inspiration from groups such as The Manhattan Transfer. The album received extensive radio play. Contributing musicians included Meir Israel and Ahrela Kaminsky (drums and percussion), Alona Toral (keyboards), Ohad Inger (bass guitar), Gil Dor, Gary Eckstein, and Haim Krio (guitars), Dario Malki (synthesizer), and Jakubovič himself (saxophone, flute, and lyric). In December 1983, the band appeared as a guest at Festigal No. 3 with the song Tomorrow the Sun Will Rise (lyrics: Mirit Shem-Ur, music: Svika Pick, arrangement: Eldad Sharim).

In 1984, the band staged the satirical show Hakol Lo Over Habibi (English: Not Everything Passes, My Friend), marking its tenth anniversary. The songs from the show were recorded on the album Hakol Lo Over Habibi, released in English as Habibi on Stage. The show and the album included songs such as The Guest (Green Tene), A Sign We Have Not Arrived (written and composed by Naomi Shemer), and Blues of the Rabbinical Stairs (music: Yuval Dor, lyrics: Amnon Dankner).

=== 1988–: Decline, reunions, and legacy ===
Further attempts to shift the band toward a more rock-oriented style were not commercially successful. The 1988 album We'll Live and See did not achieve significant sales. Songs from the album that received radio play included There Are No Grapes on the Vine, We'll Live and See, and If Many Years (all with lyrics by Nathan Zach), as well as From Another Place and Do Not Despise (lyrics by Rachel Shapira). The album was musically produced by Miki Gavrielov.

In the late 1980s, Aharon left the band to pursue a solo career and was replaced by Etty Carey, who performed with the group for about five years. Carey was later succeeded by Sharona Nestovich. With Nestovich, the band released the 1998 album Who Talks About Love. The album was not commercially successful but produced a notable song with its title track, as well as a new version of Let’s Not End Tonight. Most of the songs were written and composed by the band members and arranged by Viroslav Jakubowicz. Following the lack of commercial success, Nestovich departed, and the remaining male members continued performing for about a year without a female vocalist.

The band ceased regular activity in 2002, aside from occasional one-time or special performances. In the winter of 2006, the original lineup reunited with Aharon for a tour in Israel, directed by Tzadi Tzarfati. In 2012, the band toured again, with Yuval Dor replaced by Moshe Siman Tov. The new show, Longing for Naomi Shemer, produced by Assaf Amdursky, included guest appearances by Israel Gurion, Assaf Amdursky, and Ohad Hitman, accompanied by an orchestra. Performances with Siman Tov continued into the 2020s.

== Albums ==
=== Studio ===
- Everything passes Habibi, 1975
- The Great Song Hits of the Fifties in Israel & the World, 1975
- Songs outside the show, 1977
- The Espresso Generation, 1979
- Still a child, 1981
- Poems, 1982
- Crossing the border, 1983
- Habibi on stage, 1984
- We will live and see, 1988
- Who Talks about Love, 1998
- Everything is going through Habibi, 2013

=== Live ===
- Shlomit Aharon and Hakol Over Habibi: The joint show, 2007 (double)

=== Collections ===
- Hameitav, 1989
- Classic, 1997
- The Collection, 2001 (triple)
- The Best, 2009 (double)

Awards and achievements
Preceded by Milk and Honey with Hallelujah	Israel in the Eurovision Song Contest; 1981	Succeeded by Avi Toledano with Hora
