= Rama Messinger =

Israeli actress (1968–2015)

- רמה מסינגר
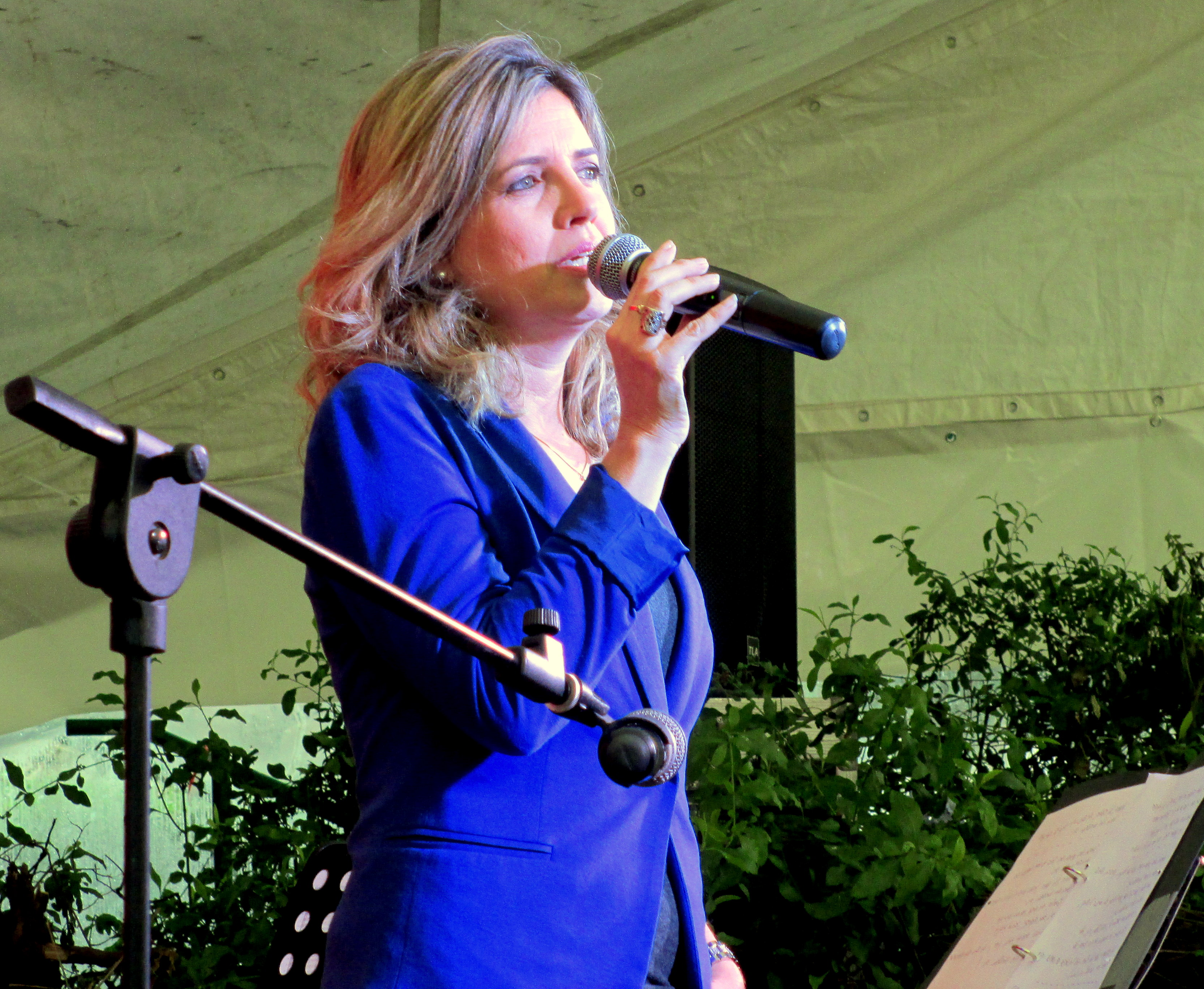
- Messinger in 2012
- Born: 3 September 1968; Ramat Ef'al, Israel
- Died: 18 August 2015 (aged 46); Tel Aviv, Israel
- Occupations: Actress; voice artist; singer
- Years active: 1991-2015
- Spouse: Aric Avigdor
- Children: 3

Rama Messinger (Hebrew: רמה מסינגר; 3 September 1968 – 18 August 2015) was an Israeli actress, voice actress and singer.

== Biography ==
Messinger was born and raised in Ramat Ef'al, Israel. She was named after her maternal uncle, Rami Gil (Mogilnik) who was an Israeli Air Force pilot who fell a year before she was born. She studied at the Thelma Yellin High School of Performing Arts. In the Israel Defense Forces, she served in the Southern Command Variety Ensemble. After her discharge, she studied at the Beit Zvi Acting School.

=== Theater career ===
Messinger played important roles in many plays in many theaters across Israel, but mainly at the national theater Habima, in plays such as Solo, Halon Balahot, Hops Ve Hopale (1991), Three Sisters, Hamefakeah Ba, Kukuriku, Sirano, Kaner Al Hagag (2008), and Meshartam Shel Shnei Adonim – a role for which Messinger won a Rosenblum Prize for Performing Arts and a Tamara Rubins Prize. At Haifa Theater she performed in Amadeus and Iluf Hasoreret. At Beersheba Theater she performed in Love Letters (2001), and Hamafteah Leshnaim. She also made appearances on The Tal and Rama Show.

Messinger participated in many productions in which she demonstrated her singing abilities. She played the main character in several musicals, such as Habima Theater's play Habarvazon (2001), Haifa Theatre's play Imra La Dos, and Tslilei Hamusika (2005). She also participated in the shows Kolot and Shlosha Beshira Ahat in 2008 alongside Dror Keren and Uri Lashman, and in Omrim Shehi Cuckoo in 2009 alongside Sarit Vino-Elad as part of a fundraising day for the Israeli Women's Network. She performed with many Israeli orchestras such as the Holon Jazz Orchestra, with the Israeli Symphonic Orchestra of Rishon LeZion and the Tel Aviv Performing Arts Center in the concert Chansons, with the Kibbutz Chamber Orchestra in The Seven Sins as part of the Israel Festival, and with the Israel Broadcasting Authority Orchestra.In 2006, she worked for the first time as a director in the play Meorim, written by Amir Rotem and Yael Neeman for the Pothim Masah festival.

=== Television career ===
Messinger took part in many children's television programs. In 1996, she hosted the TV shows Shuvo shel Hasharif, and in 2008 hosted Zu Yalduti, both on the Hinuchit channel. Later, she hosted Malkat Halvavot on the Viva channel. She acted in several comedy television programs, such as Tsahal 1 (1997), Shtok Show, Shirei Tel'ad, Sefi, the artistic corner of Zehu Ze, and the drama Sex, Lies, and Dinner. In 2005 she acted in the children's TV series Terale's Igloo on the HOP Channel, and Amaliya's Heart on HOT. In 2011, she performed in the daily drama program Alifim on Arutz HaYeladim, playing the prime minister's wife and the stepmother of the protagonist of the show Rony Metzger.

In 2000, Messinger performed as an actor and singer on Datya Ben Dor's children's cassette Mahsan Hashtuzim Shel Datya, along with Rami Baruch and Michal Tzafir. Toward the end of 2014, she performed as Iris (the mother of Daniel, played by Ian Pinkovic) in the series North Star on YES Disney Channel.

=== Voice acting career ===
Messinger provided voice acting for animated films dubbed into Hebrew. Starting in 1993, she performed the role of Princess Jasmine in Disney's Aladdin film series (Aladdin, The Return of Jafar, Aladdin and the King of Thieves). In 1997, she performed the same role in Disney's television series Aladdin, and the role of Kayley from the movie Quest for Camelot. In 1996, she performed the role of Andy's mother from the Toy Story films, and played Calimero's mother in the television series Calimero, Ariel in The Little Mermaid (replacing Shlomit Aharon), Rosie from A Bug's Life and the speaking voice of Pocahontas in Pocahontas II: Journey to a New World.

In 2000, Messinger voiced Ariel in The Little Mermaid II: Return to the Sea and Moominmamma in the television show Moomin. In 2001, she voiced Celia in Monsters, Inc. and voiced Dory in Finding Nemo in 2003. In 2004, she voiced the Fairy Godmother in Shrek 2, and Grace the Cow in Home on the Range.

In 2007 she played Ella from Happily N'Ever After. In 2010 she reprised Andy's mother in Toy Story 3, and voiced Kitty Galore in the movie Cats & Dogs: The Revenge of Kitty Galore. In 2012, she voiced Sid's grandmother in Ice Age: Continental Drift. In 2013, she played the role of Ugga from The Croods.

== Death ==
After a prolonged illness, Messinger died from cancer on 18 August 2015 at Ichilov Hospital in Tel Aviv, aged 46. She lived at the moshav Bnei Atarot, was married to Aric Avigdor, and had three children. The Hebrew dubbings of Hotel Transylvania 2 and Finding Dory were dedicated to her memory.

== Prizes ==
- Keren Sharet Prize (1991)
- Miryam Bernshtein-Cohen Prize
- Theatrono Prize 1994 for the play Even a Love Story Needs an Ending.
- Theater Prize for best actor of the year (1999) for her role in Kol Katan.
- Israeli Theater Prize (2012) for best main actor for her role of Florence Poster Jenkins in Sovinir, at Beersheba Theater.
- Rosenblum Prize for Performing Arts and Tamara Rubins Prize for the play Meshartam Shel Shnei Adonim.
