= Amnon Wolf =

Israeli actor (born 1971)

- אמנון וולף
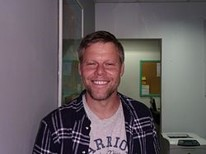
- Wolf in 2017
- Born: 21 July 1971 (age 54); Haifa, Israel
- Occupations: Actor; voice actor
- Years active: 1990–present
- Father: Dan Wolf
- Relatives: Zvi Wolf (grandfather)

Amnon Wolf (Hebrew: אמנון וולף; born 21 July 1971) is an Israeli actor and voice actor.

== Biography ==
Born in Haifa, Wolf began studying at the Hebrew Reali School before moving on to study at the Nissan Nativ Acting Studio. He began his career mainly as a stage actor during the early 1990s. From 1997 until the late 2000s, he mostly performed at the Gesher Theatre and starred in adaptations of Tartuffe, Three Sisters, The Marriage of Figaro, A Midsummer Night's Dream and more. He has also acted at the Habima Theatre throughout the second half of the 2010s.

On film and television, Wolf has appeared in numerous television shows, including the first season of North Star in which he portrayed Gil. He also starred in films such as Time of Favor, Yana's Friends, and he even made an appearance in Shel Mi HaShura HaZot?. One of Wolf’s prominent appearances was his portrayal of Yitzhak Rabin in a TV film adaptation depicting the initiation of the Six-Day War.

Wolf is also a prominent voice artist. He made his very first voice dubbing contribution in the 2004 film Ella Enchanted. Wolf is renowned for dubbing the voices of Mantis in Kung Fu Panda, Overhaul in Transformers: Cybertron, Dr. Drakken and Señor Senior, Sr. in Kim Possible, The Missing Link in Monsters vs. Aliens, Mr. Turner in The Fairly OddParents, Mr. Bobinsky in Coraline and he also voiced Mr. Krabs in the fourth season of SpongeBob SquarePants, briefly substituting for Ami Mandelman, as well as Plankton in the film, Grunkle Stan in Gravity Falls, Jake in Adventure Time, Dracule Mihawk and Genzo in One Piece and many more. He has worked closely with Yoram Yosefsberg, Gilad Kleter, Simcha Barbiro and other dubbers.

=== Personal life ===
Wolf is the son of college professor Dan Wolf. His paternal grandfather, Zvi Wolf was a guardsman for the Hashomer.
