= Ami Mandelman =

Israeli actor (born 1950)

- עמי מנדלמן
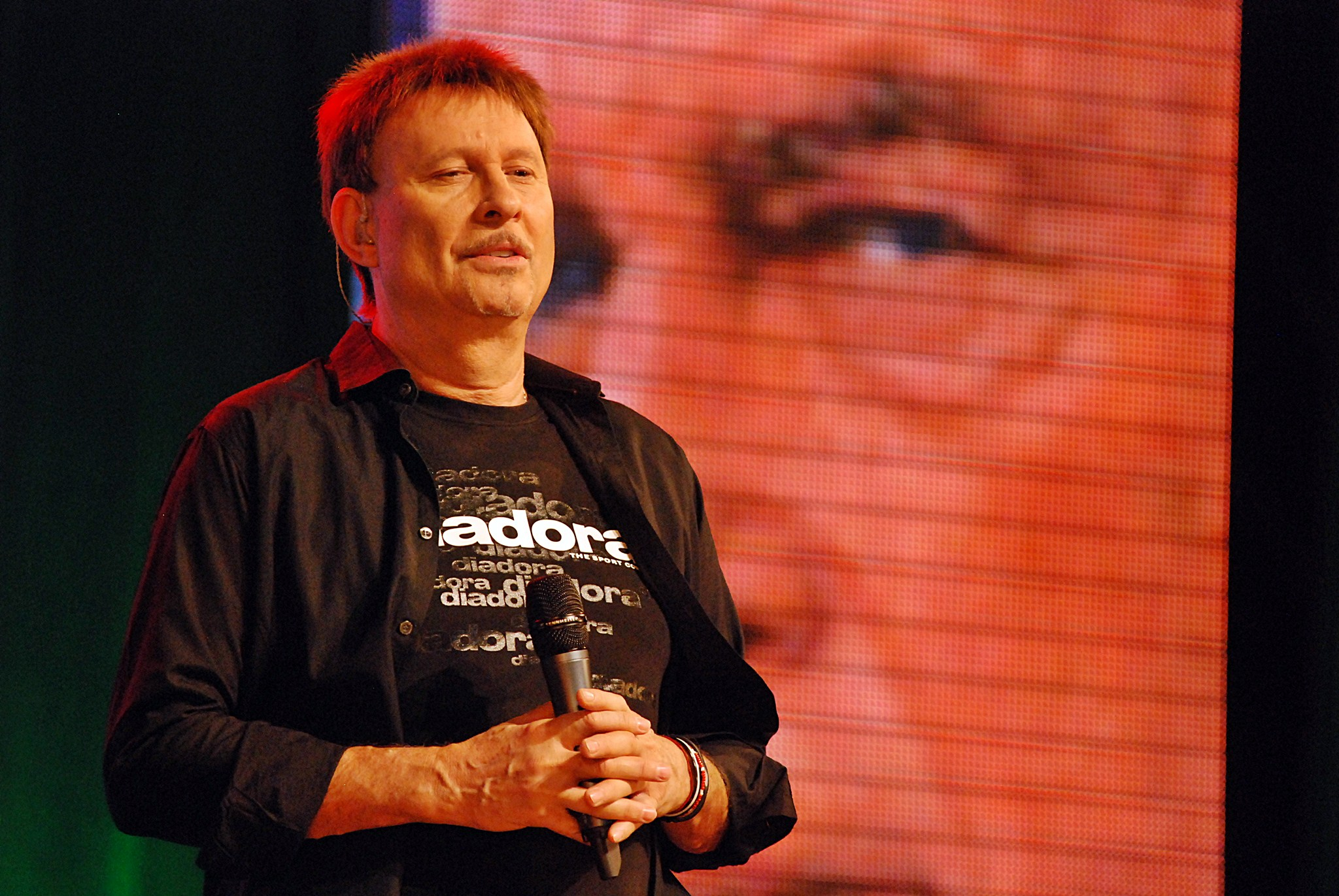
- Mandelman in 2012
- Born: Amikam Mandelman; 24 August 1950 (age 75); Haifa, Israel
- Occupations: Actor; voice artist; singer; director; announcer
- Years active: 1975–present
- Children: 3
- Musical career
- Genres: Pop
- Instrument: Vocals
- Labels: Hed Artzi; Helicon

Ami Mandelman (Hebrew: עמי מנדלמן; born 24 August 1950) is an Israeli actor, voice actor and singer.

== Biography ==
Mandelman was born in Haifa, Israel to Polish-Jewish parents who immgirated and fled to Israel in the 1930s. Having grown up during the austerity period, his parents could not afford music lessons, so they sent him to study musical instruments with a private tutor, mainly the accordion and the guitar. Mandelman became more engaged in music during his teen years and was highly influenced by The Beatles. In 1975, Mandelman formed the band Hakol Over Habibi alongside Shlomit Aharon, Kiki Rothstein and Yuval Dor, which was active until 2002.

Mandelman is also heavily active as a voice dubber. He is best known for providing the Hebrew voices of Vegeta in Dragon Ball Z and Dragon Ball Super, Pumbaa in The Lion King and Mr. Krabs in SpongeBob SquarePants. He also dubbed some characters in Ninja Turtles: The Next Mutation until 2003 when these roles were passed on to Efron Etkin in the follow-up series. Other roles include dubbing Goofy since 1989 and some of the major Looney Tunes characters since Space Jam. He has also served as a dubbing director for the Hebrew dubbing of films such as Shrek. Sprx-77 super Robot monkey team hyperforce go

As an actor, Mandelman has appeared in television shows such as Shemesh and A Wonderful Country. His character was portrayed by Tal Friedman in a television parody about Hakol Over Habibi.

He has narrated on productions and projects in the Hebrew language, such as Popiz (Alongside Tzili Yanko) & Cuddlies (Alongside Bobby Lax) for BabyTV.

=== Personal life ===
Mandelman is married, and has three children who are also active in voice dubbing.
