= The Sandman Universe =

Comics line

Publication information
- Publisher: DC Comics; DC Vertigo (2018–2019; 2024); DC Black Label (2019–2024)
- Genre: Dark fantasy
- Publication date: August 2018 – 2024
- Main characters: Dream; Lucien; Matthew Cable; Lucifer; Dora; Timothy Hunter; Erzulie; John Constantine; Ruin; Corinthian; Dead Boy Detectives; Thessaly

The Sandman Universe is a line of American comic books published by DC Comics, which is owned by Skydance Corporation, under its imprints DC Vertigo and DC Black Label. The line launched to celebrate the 30th anniversary of Neil Gaiman's The Sandman (1989–1996) and Vertigo's 25th anniversary. The Sandman Universe began in August 2018, with a titular one-shot, which was followed by four ongoing series—House of Whispers, Lucifer, Books of Magic, and The Dreaming. Each comic is overseen by Gaiman but written by new creative teams.

== Conception and development ==
The Sandman Universe celebrates the 30th anniversary of DC Comics' The Sandman and the 25th anniversary of the launch of the DC Vertigo imprint. The line was conceived and is overseen by the series' creator, Neil Gaiman, but produced by new creative teams. The Sandman Universe expands The Sandman's part of the DC Universe using new characters and concepts. The line was announced by Entertainment Weekly in March 2018 and was accompanied by a trailer featuring Gaiman. It launched with the one-shot The Sandman Universe #1 on August 8, 2018, with the other series following on later dates.

When asked why he returned to The Sandman, Gaiman said he began to feel guilty that almost no one had been able to return to the series since its conclusion and liked the idea of reviving it, as well as letting new writers play with his "toys". Gaiman assembled the writing team for the line with the Vertigo editorial team. Both parties suggested writers who they thought would be good for new Sandman stories. Samples by writers were then read by Gaiman, who decided whether or not they were proficient. Choosing writers also involved deciding which comic suited which writer best. Gaiman cited Nalo Hopkinson's science fiction work as an influence for assigning her to House of Whispers. Gaiman chose Kat Howard, who he has worked with for several years, to reboot The Books of Magic because of her handling of magic in her stories, and Dan Watters to write Lucifer because he was up to the challenge of recreating the character.

== Titles ==
The Sandman Universe began with a titular one-shot released in August 2018. It picks up after the events of DC's 2017–2018 Dark Nights: Metal crossover event. Dream has disappeared since the conclusion of Metal, leading to chaos in his homeland of the Dreaming. Each Sandman Universe series follows a story thread introduced in the one-shot.

Title	Issues	Writer(s)	Artist(s)	Publication date	Format
Year One
The Sandman Universe	#1	Simon Spurrier, Kat Howard, Nalo Hopkinson, Dan Watters	Bilquis Evely, Tom Fowler, Dominike Stanton, Max Fiumara, Sebastian Fiumara	August 2018	One-shot
The Dreaming	#1–20	Simon Spurrier	Bilquis Evely	September 2018 – April 2020	Monthly ongoing
House of Whispers	#1–22	Nalo Hopkinson, Dan Watters	Dominike Stanton	September 2018 – June 2020	Monthly ongoing
Lucifer	#1–24 (Note: Issues #19–24 were published only as a collected edition, in part due to the COVID-19 pandemic.)	Dan Watters	Max Fiumara and Sebastian Fiumara	October 2018 – March 2020	Monthly ongoing
Books of Magic	#1–23	Kat Howard, David Barnett	Tom Fowler	October 2018 – September 2020	Monthly ongoing
Year Two
The Sandman Universe Presents: Hellblazer	#1	Simon Spurrier	Marcio Takara	October 2019	One-shot
John Constantine, Hellblazer	#1–12	Simon Spurrier	Aaron Campbell	November 2019 – November 2020	Monthly ongoing
Year Three
The Dreaming: Waking Hours	#1–12	G. Willow Wilson	Nick Robles	May 2020 – August 2021	Limited series
Locke & Key: Hell & Gone (Note: A crossover with Locke & Key by IDW Publishing.)	#0–2	Joe Hill	Gabriel Rodriguez	December 2020 – September 2021	Limited series
Year Four
Nightmare Country	#1–6	James Tynion IV	Lisandro Estherren	April 12, 2022 – September 27, 2022	Limited Series
Dead Boy Detectives	#1–6	Pornsak Pichetshote	Jeff Stokley	December 27, 2022 – May 24, 2023	Limited Series
Year Five
Nightmare Country: The Glass House	#1–6	James Tynion IV	Lisandro Estherren	April 4, 2023 – December 26, 2023	Limited Series
The Sandman Universe Special: Thessaly	#1	James Tynion IV	Maria Llovet, Reiko Murakami	August 1, 2023	One-shot
Year Six
John Constantine, Hellblazer: Dead in America	#1–11	Simon Spurrier	Aaron Campbell	January 2024 – December 2024	Limited Series

== Collected editions ==
Title	Material collected	Format	Publication date	ISBN
The Dreaming
Vol. 1: Pathways and Emanations	The Dreaming #1–6; The Sandman Universe #1	TP	June 5, 2019	978-1401291174
Vol. 2: Empty Shells	The Dreaming #7–12	TP	January 8, 2020	978-1401295639
Vol. 3: One Magical Movement	The Dreaming #13–20	TP	July 8, 2020	978-1779502834
House of Whispers
Vol. 1: The Power Divided	House of Whispers #1–6; The Sandman Universe #1	TP	July 24, 2019	978-1401291358
Vol. 2: Ananse	House of Whispers #7–12	TP	February 19, 2020	978-1401299170
Vol. 3: Watching the Watchers	House of Whispers #13–22	TP	October 27, 2020	978-1779504319
Lucifer
Vol. 1: The Infernal Comedy	Lucifer #1–6; The Sandman Universe #1	TP	June 19, 2019	978-1401291334
Vol. 2: The Divine Tragedy	Lucifer #7–13	TP	January 22, 2020	978-1401295721
Vol. 3: The Wild Hunt	Lucifer #14–19	TP	July 28, 2020	978-1779502353
Vol. 4: The Devil at Heart	Lucifer #20–24	TP	February 2, 2021	978-1779507556
Books of Magic
Vol. 1: Moveable Type	Books of Magic #1–6; The Sandman Universe #1	TP	July 10, 2019	978-1401291341
Vol. 2: Second Quarto	Books of Magic #7–13	TP	February 5, 2020	978-1401299040
Vol. 3: Dwelling in Possibility	Books of Magic #14–23	TP	February 16, 2021	978-1779503008
John Constantine, Hellblazer
Vol. 1: Marks of Woe	The Sandman Universe Presents: Hellblazer #1; John Constantine, Hellblazer #1–6; Books of Magic #14	TP	September 29, 2020	978-1779502896
Vol. 2: The Best Version of You	John Constantine, Hellblazer #7–12	TP	March 30, 2021	978-1779509536
The Dreaming: Waking Hours
The Dreaming: Waking Hours TP	The Dreaming: Waking Hours #1–12	TP	November 16, 2021	978-1779512734
Locke & Key: Hell & Gone
Locke & Key: The Golden Age	Small World #1; Guide to the Know Keys #1; "Face the Music"; ...In Pale Battalions Go... #1–3; Hell & Gone #1–2	HC	April 26, 2022	978-1684057856
Nightmare Country
Vol. 1	Nightmare Country #1–6	TP	April 4, 2023	978-1779518415
Dead Boy Detectives
Vol. 1	Dead Boy Detectives #1–6	TP	November 7, 2023	978-1779523297

== Reception ==
According to the review aggregator Comic Book Roundup, the line has an average rating of 8.9/10 based on 20 reviews.
