= North Star (TV series) =

Israeli television series

- Genre: Teen drama
- Created by: Michal Cooper Keren
- Written by: Michal Cooper Keren
- Directed by: Offer Waizman
- Starring: Ariel Mortman; Guy Kally; Eyan Pinkovich; Lin Asherov; Yuval Shevach; Gal Goldstein; Hila Lusia; Asaf Yuval; Yoni Green; Amit Moscovitz
- Theme music composer: Doron Medalie
- Opening theme: "הזמן שלי בעולם" performed by Lin Asherov
- Country of origin: Israel
- Original language: Hebrew
- No. of seasons: 2
- No. of episodes: 100

Production
- Executive producer: Ronnie Perry
- Producers: Oz Vidal; Elinor Levy Harel
- Running time: 20-30 minutes
- Production company: Herzliya Studios

Original release
- Network: Disney Channel Israel (yes)
- Release: November 30, 2014 – June 16, 2016

Related
- Summer Break Stories

North Star (Hebrew: כוכב הצפון, also known as Northern Star) is an Israeli teen drama series of The Walt Disney Company, which was produced by Herzliya Studios. The series premiered on Disney Channel Israel on 30 November 2014. Disney Channel Israel gave the green light for the production of a final second season in February 2015, which was first shown on 6 March 2016. In the series North Star some actors from the Israeli Disney Channel Original Series Summer Break Stories appear as their characters. The finale of North Star was broadcast on June 16, 2016 by Israeli Disney Channel.

The British Disney Channel produced an adaptation under the title The Lodge which premiered in September 2016.

== Plot ==
15-year-old Maya from Tel Aviv moves with her father Ehud to a remote village to manage the hotel North Star. The hotel is currently owned by Gideon, Maya's grandfather and the father of her mother who died two years earlier. Arriving at the hotel, Maya tries to make a new beginning, and to build a new life. But Maya's new life is not free from complications. Maya must navigate through the everyday stresses of life of a teenager, and must protect herself from false friends. Complicating it is, that there is a new woman named Yuly in her father's life, that Maya finds difficult to handle. Fortunately, Maya finds new friends and falls in love with a boy named Sean. But soon after, Maya learns a secret that could not only turn their lives upside down, but also may lead to the closure of the hotel.

== Characters ==
=== Main ===
- Ariel Mortman as Maya
- Guy Kally as Sean
- Eyan Pinkovich as Danielle
- Lin Asherov as Noa
- Yuval Shevach as Edo
- Gal Goldstein as Ben
- Hila Lusia as Gal
- Asaf Yuval as Lior
- Yoni Green as Omer
- Amit Moscovitz as Roni

=== Recurring ===
- Alon Neuman as Ehud
- Efrat Boimold as Yuly
- Amnon Wolf as Gil
- Rama Messinger as Iris
- Avishag Rabiner as Ella
- Maayan Blum as Tal
- Daniel Sabag as Alon
- Israel Bright as Moshik
- Omri Loukas as Oz
- Dror Yarden as Ofek
- Ilan Dar as Gideon

=== Guest stars ===
- Yonatan Bashan as Adam
- Michaela Elkin as Karin
- Gaya Gur Arie as Eleanor
- Esti Tayeb as Shiri
- May Meir as Sivan
- Tamara Galoz-Eilay as Amber
- Lee Lotan as Daria
- Shay Gabso as Michael

== Episodes ==
Season	Episodes	Originally released	
Season	Episodes	First released	Last released
1	50	November 30, 2013	February 4, 2014
2	50	March 6, 2016	June 16, 2016
