= Dan Watters =

English comic book writer

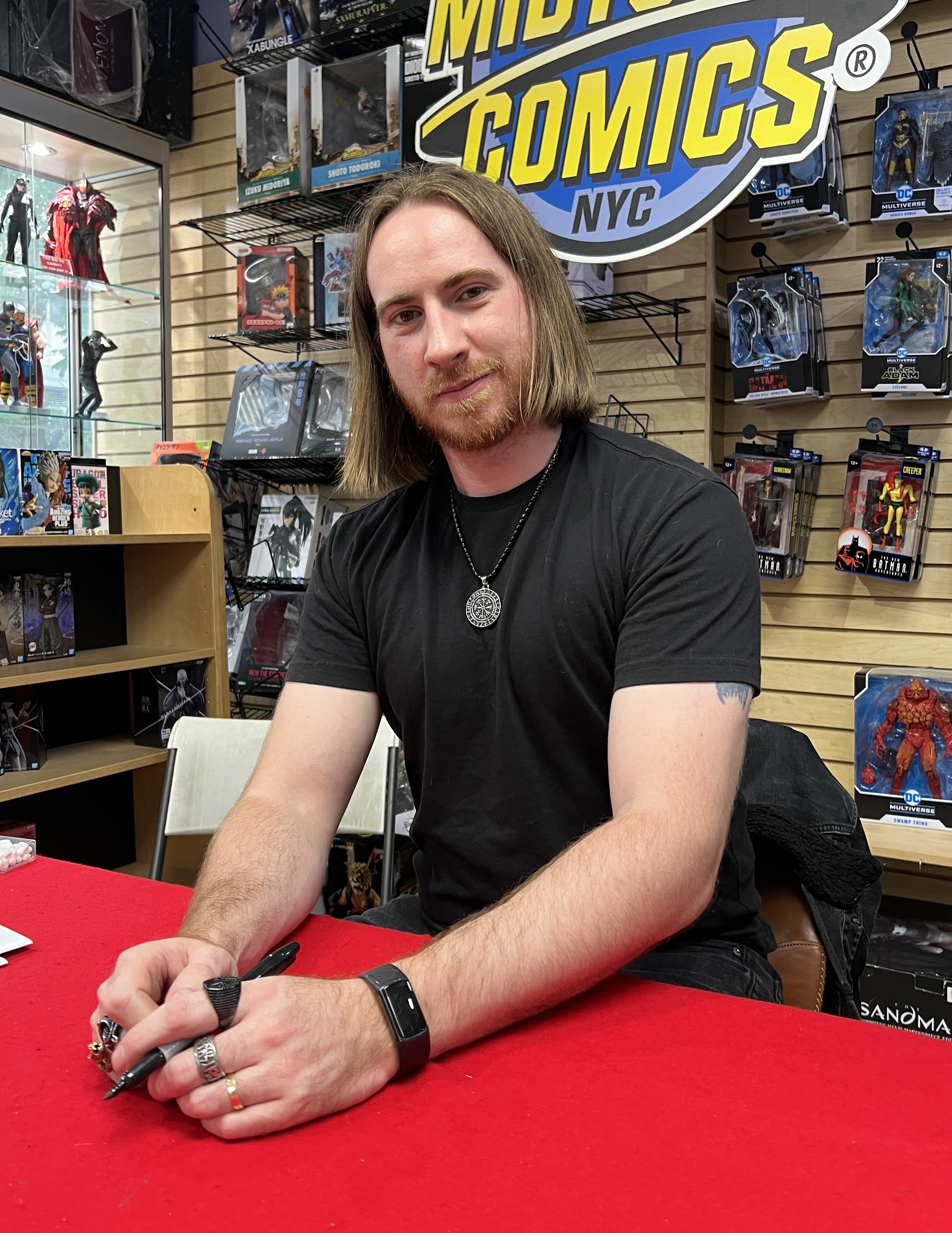
- Watters in 2025
- Born: Dan Watters London, England
- Area: Writer
- Notable works: Coffin Bound, Home Sick Pilots, Lucifer, Arkham City: The Order of the World, Destro, Batman: Dark Patterns, Nightwing

Dan Watters is an English comics writer who has written for Marvel Comics, DC Comics, and independent comics. He is best known for his creator-owned comics Coffin Bound and Home Sick Pilots and his work on Lucifer and Batman.

== Life and career ==
Dan Watters was born in London. Watters's first creator-owned comic was the six-issue comic Limbo, which he made with artist Caspar Wijngaard and was published in 2015-2016 through Image Comics. ComicsAlliance described the book as "Lovecraft meets Cronenberg as Innsmouth and Videodrome collide in an explosion of magic, myth, jazz and Kafka." Watters and Wijngaard continued working together, doing stories for Dark Souls and Assassin's Creed for Titan Comics. Watters then worked with Alex Paknadel to do a comic adaptation of Little Nightmares before working on The Shadow with Si Spurrier and Wolfenstein.

In 2018, he released Deep Roots through Vault Comics, which was one of the first comics he created as part of White Noise, the British comic collective made up of Watters, Ryan O’Sullivan, Alex Paknadel, and Ram V. This comic would end up being dramatised by GraphicAudio as a full-cast audiobook the following year. He was then announced as the writer for Lucifer for DC's Sandman Universe imprint and co-wrote House of Whispers with Nalo Hopkinson. In 2019, he and artist Dani put out the creator-owed Coffin Bound though Image, a surreal post-apocalyptic western.

In 2020, he re-teamed with Wijngaard to publish Home Sick Pilots, a "punk rock horror" comic, through Image. He also published The Picture of Everything Else, a take of The Picture of Dorian Gray, through Vault. In 2021, he teamed up with artist Dani again to work on Arkham City: The Order of the World, a six-issue mini-series for DC Comics about a psychiatrist from Arkham Asylum attempting to find a number of patients who have escaped into the city. As part of the book, they reinvented the villain the Ten-Eyed Man.

In 2021, he and artist Lamar Mathurin worked on Titan's four issue Cowboy Bebop comic, adapting from the 2021 Netflix show, and in 2022, he wrote a six-issue Sword of Azrael mini-series for DC with artist Nikola Čižmešija. In 2022, it was announced by Humanoids that Watters would write one of the prequel graphic novels for The Incal called Dying Star, with artist Jon Davis-Hunt. In 2023, he worked with artist Sebastián Cabrol on The Seasons Have Teeth, a four-issue series from Boom! Studios, and with artist Germán Peralta on Loki for Marvel.

In September 2023, he worked with Ram V on Detective Comics and then, in 2024, they wrote Universal Monsters: Creature from the Black Lagoon Lives! together for Skybound/Image. He and Ram V also worked together on two Image mini-series that would tell one story about a serial killer in a neo-noir cyberpunk setting: Ram V writing The One Hand and Watters writing The Six Fingers. He was also announced to be the writer for the Destro mini-series at Skybound.

In March 2024, he was announced as the writer for Titan's Doctor Who: The Fifteenth Doctor series. In July 2024, he was announced along with artist Dexter Soy as the new creative team for Nightwing. In September on 2024, it was announced that he and artist Hayden Sherman would work on the twelve-issue mini-series Batman: Dark Patterns, a look at four of Batman's early cases in Gotham, described as "lo-fi [and] mystery focused." In October 2026, Watters was announced as the writer of a DC Elseworlds limited series titled Green Lantern: Doomed Cosmos, a military science fiction story starring Hal Jordan.

== Personal life ==
As of 2020, Watters' profile pages at Simon & Schuster indicates he lives in London.

== Bibliography ==
=== DC Comics ===
- Absolute Power Task Force VII #7 (2024)
- Action Comics Presents: Doomsday Special #1 (2023)
- Aquaman 80th Anniversary 100-Page Super Spectacular #1, short story "What Remains of a Storm" (2021)
- Arkham City: The Order of the World #1-6 (2021-2022)
- Batman:
  - Batman Secret Files #3, short story "Afraid of America" (2020)
  - Batman: Dark Patterns #1-12 (2025-2026)
  - Batman: The Brave and the Bold vol. 2 #10, short story "The Cheeseburger" (2024)
  - Batman: Urban Legends #8-10, three-part story "Dark Knight of the Soul" and #17, short story "On His Worst Nights" (2021-2022)
  - Detective Comics #1040, backup story "The Quiet and Unsung Death of Kirk Langstrom" (2021), #1072-1089, backup stories (2023-2024)
  - Gotham City Villains Anniversary Giant #1, short story "The Perfect Fit" (2021)
  - Knight Terrors: Detective Comics #1-2 (2023)
- Dark Crisis:
  - Dark Crisis: The Deadly Green #1 (2022)
  - Dark Crisis: Worlds Without a Justice League - Wonder Woman #1, short story "The Martian Squidhunter" (2022)
- DC's Saved by the Belle Reve #1, short story "How Angels Are Made" (2022)
- Future State: Superman/Wonder Woman #1-2 (2021)
- Infinite Frontier Secret Files #1, short story "My Brother is a Kind of Shadow" and "The Third Question" (2021)
- Justice League Dark 2021 Annual vol. 2 #1 (2021)
- The Last God: Songs of Lost Children #1 (2020)
- Lazarus Planet: We Once Were Gods #1, short story "Songs of Pain" (2023)
- New Year's Evil vol. 2 #1, short story "Winter's Root" (2019)
- Nightwing #119-present (2024–present)
- Ocean Master: Year of the Villain #1 (2019)
- Poison Ivy #25, short story "The Pyrophyte" (2024)
- The Sandman Universe:
  - The Sandman Universe #1 (2018)
  - House of Whispers #5-22, co-written with Nalo Hopkinson (2018-2020)
  - Lucifer vol. 3 #1-18, issues #19-24 released in trade paperback (2018-2020)
- Secrets of Sinister House vol. 2 #1, short story "Footsteps of Old Worm" (2019)
- Super-Pets Special: Bitedentity Crisis #1, short story "The Little Cat" (2024)
- Superman Red and Blue #1, short story "Human Colors" (2021)
- Sword of Azrael #1-6 (2022-2023)
- Sword of Azrael: Dark Knight of the Soul #1 (2022)

=== Marvel Comics ===
- Loki vol. 4 #1-4 (2023)
- Moon Knight Annual vol. 5 #1 (2024)

=== Other Companies ===
==== Boom! Studios ====
- The Seasons Have Teeth #1-4 (2023)

=== Dark Horse Comics ===
- Cyberpunk 2077: Psycho Squad #1-4 (2025)

==== Dynamite Entertainment ====
- The Shadow #1-6 (2017-2018)

==== Humanoids ====
- The Incal Universe: Free Comic Book Day 2022, short story "Dying Star" (2022)
- The Incal: Dying Star (2023)

==== Image Comics ====
- Coffin Bound #1-8 (2019-2020)
- Creepshow vol. 2 #2 (2023)
- Destro #1-5 (2024)
- G.I. Joe: A Real American Hero – Jinx (2025)
- Home Sick Pilots #1-15 (2020-2022)
- Limbo #1-6 (2015-2016)
- The Six Fingers #1-5 (2024)
- Universal Monsters: Creature from the Black Lagoon Lives! #1-4 (2024)

==== TinyOnion ====
- Razorblades: The Horror Magazine #3 (2022)

==== Titan Comics ====
- Assassin's Creed: Uprising #1-8 (2017)
- Cowboy Bebop #1-4 (2022)
- Dark Souls: Legends of the Flame #1-2 (2016)
- Dark Souls: Tales of Ember #2 (2017)
- Doctor Who: Free Comic Book Day 2024 (2024)
- Doctor Who: The Fifteenth Doctor #1-4 (2024)
- Little Nightmares #1-2 (2017)
- Wolfenstein #1-2 (2017)

==== Vault Comics ====
- Deep Roots #1-5 (2018)
- The Picture of Everything Else #1-3 (2020-2021)

Preceded by Tom Taylor	Nightwing writer 2024–present	Succeeded by N/A
