= The Lodge (TV series) =

British television series

- Genre: Musical; Drama; Mystery
- Based on: North Star by Michal Cooper Keren
- Starring: Sophie Simnett; Luke Newton; Thomas Doherty; Bethan Wright; Jayden Revri; Jade Alleyne; Joshua Sinclair-Evans; Mia Jenkins
- Theme music composer: Jeannie Lurie; Aristeidis Archontis; Chen Neeman
- Opening theme: "Starting Over, Starting Now"
- Composers: Jeannie Lurie; Aris Archontis; Chen Neeman; Matthew Tishler
- Country of origin: United Kingdom
- Original language: English
- No. of series: 2
- No. of episodes: 25

Production
- Executive producer: Steven Andrew
- Producer: Raymond Lau
- Running time: 21–23 minutes
- Production company: Zodiak Kids Studios UK

Original release
- Network: Disney Channel
- Release: 23 September 2016 – 3 November 2017

The Lodge was a British musical drama and mystery television series that premiered on Disney Channel UK on 23 September 2016 and on the U.S. Disney Channel on 17 October 2016. The series is based on the Israeli series North Star and stars Sophie Simnett, Luke Newton, Thomas Doherty, Bethan Wright, Jayden Revri, Jade Alleyne, Joshua Sinclair-Evans, and Mia Jenkins.

== Premise ==
Fifteen-year-old Skye moves with her father Ed from the big city to rural countryside, where they take over a local hotel called North Star, which was previously owned and managed by Skye's grandfather Patrick. At their new home, Skye tries to build a life, but this new life is far from complication free as she must navigate through the everyday stresses of life as a teenager. When she discovers that her father is planning to sell the hotel to Gil, Skye becomes upset as she has developed an emotional attachment to it. Skye decides to convince her father not to sell the hotel only to discover that the man wanting to buy it is her new friend's father. Skye receives the support of her friends, but not everyone is as interested as she is in saving it. Skye discovers secrets over time that will affect not only her life, but that of the hotel.

== Cast and characters ==
=== Main ===
- Sophie Simnett as Skye Hart, a girl who moves to the North Star.
- Luke Newton as Ben Evans, a repairman at the North Star who enjoys the outdoors.
- Thomas Doherty as Sean Matthews, a North Star employee who enjoys mountain biking.
- Bethan Wright as Danielle Clark, Skye's frenemy, Sean's ex-girlfriend, and Ben's girlfriend.
- Jayden Revri as Noah Potts, a worker at the North Star who is a DJ.
- Jade Alleyne as Kaylee Markson, a worker at the North Star who plans to be a singer.
- Joshua Sinclair-Evans as Josh, Skye's friend from the city who she contacts for advice.
- Mia Jenkins as Alex, the cousin of Skye Hart who gets a job at the North Star. (series 2)

=== Recurring ===
- Marcus Garvey as Ed Hart, the father of Skye.
- John Hopkins as Samuel "SJ" James, the uncle of Kyle and Aaron.
- Geoffrey McGivern as Patrick Hart, the grandfather of Skye and the original owner of the North Star.
- Dan Richardson as Gil Matthews, the father of Sean.
- Ellie Taylor as Christina, the director of the reality series My Amazing Life.
- Laila Rouass as Olivia Clark, the mother of Danielle.
- Dominic Harrison as Oz, a singer who is a temporary love interest for Kaylee.
- Tom Hudson as Kyle, the nephew of SJ.
- Martin Anzor as Aaron, the nephew of SJ.
- Sarah Nauta as Lori, a girl who worked for Christina. Nauta also voices her character in the Dutch dub of the series.
- Clara Rugaard as Ana, Ben's ex-girlfriend from Norway who befriends Danielle. Rugaard also voices her character in the Danish dub of the series.
- Cameron King as Ethan Evans, the younger brother of Ben who enjoys rock-climbing.
- Emma Campbell-Jones as Ella Matthews, the mother of Sean.
- Lina Larissa Strahl as Frankie, a student at Kaylee's music college.
- Kimberley Walsh as Rebecca, a music producer who encourages Frankie to steal Kaylee's song.
- Dove Cameron as Jess, Sean's friend who enjoys competitive biking.

== Episodes ==
Series	Episodes	Originally released	
Series	Episodes	First released	Last released
1	10	17 October 2016	25 November 2016
2	15	9 June 2017	3 November 2017

=== Series 1 (2016) ===
No. overall	No. in season	Title	Directed by	Written by	UK air date	U.S. air date	UK viewers (millions)	U.S. viewers (millions)
1	1	"The New Girl"	Matt Bloom	Lee Walters	23 September 2016	17 October 2016	0.26	0.80
Skye and Ed arrive at the North Star, where she meets Sean. Skye calls Josh, who encourages her to flirt with Sean, until she learns he has a girlfriend, Danielle, who is filming for a reality series. Danielle reveals to Skye that Sean's father is buying the lodge, who races to convince Ed not to sell the lodge. The producers of Danielle's reality series approach Skye about filming a series at the North Star. Song featured: "Starting Over, Starting Now"
2	2	"Reality Check"	Matt Bloom	Lee Walters	30 September 2016	18 October 2016	0.18	0.73
Skye, Kaylee, Noah and Ben redecorate the North Star, and Skye invites the My Amazing Life team to film a reality series there. Sean promises Danielle that he won't speak to Skye, but she later finds Skye and Sean flirting. To ease the situation, Ben says that he and Skye are dating and he kisses her on the cheek. Skye visits her dead mother's favourite place, where she discovers her initials alongside "SJ". Kaylee performs for a music night, but Kyle and Aaron turn the power off. In a confessional booth, Noah expresses his feelings for Kaylee but the footage is seen by Lori, who then deletes it. Songs featured: "Believe That" and "If You Only Knew"
3	3	"Opportunities"	Matt Bloom	Robert Evans	7 October 2016	19 October 2016	0.19	0.71
Skye offers Sean a job at the North Star to help him pay for his mountain biking competitions. Angry at Skye, Danielle reveals to her that Ben's ex, Ana, is back in town. Skye goes rock climbing with Ben and his brother Ethan. Ben later takes Skye to her mum's favourite place and asks her out. Skye's grandfather decides to leave the North Star, and he gives Skye a suitcase full of her mother's belongings, where she finds a diary with "SJ" in. Songs featured: "If You Only Knew – Duet" and "Never Let You Go"
4	4	"Double Date"	Matt Bloom	James Whitehouse & Hannah George	14 October 2016	20 October 2016	0.14	0.74
Danielle proposes a double date, inviting Skye and Ben to go with her and Sean, but also invites Ana. To see which girl Ben likes more, when Ana falls in, Danielle pushes Skye into the water. Ben saves Ana, as she can't swim, leading Sean to save Skye. Kaylee learns that the My Amazing Life team is plotting to keep her and Noah apart. Noah, Kaylee and Lori also find a secret room below the lodge, which leads to a pathway to Skye's mum's favourite place. Ana leaves, and Josh arrives at the North Star. Songs featured: "Something About Me" and "Starting Over, Starting Now – Ballad"
5	5	"#Winning"	Matt Bloom	Bronagh Taggart	21 October 2016	21 October 2016	0.22	0.77
Sean and Ben compete in a mountain biking competition, and when Sean falls, Ben wins. Skye congratulates Ben, but when left alone with Sean, he kisses her. Danielle oversees the kiss, and asks her father if she can move in with him, to which he declines. Kaylee and Noah host auditions for a singer to perform at the North Star's concert, where they find Oz. Ed reveals to Skye that he is dating Christina, the director of the reality series. Songs featured: "Believe That" and "Tell It Like It Is"
6	6	"Best Kept Secrets"	Dez McCarthy	Scott Payne	28 October 2016	28 October 2016	0.12	0.73
Danielle begins working for My Amazing Life, and films Skye confessing that Sean kissed her. Danielle confronts Sean and asks him if he has feelings for Skye and he says yes. When Skye tells Ben, he is furious and accidentally pushes Sean down the stairs, who sprains his ankle. Oz flirts with Kaylee, and when Noah notices, he tries to convince Kaylee that Oz is not serious about her, and just wants to be featured on the reality series. Songs featured: "Something About Me" and "Favourite Place to Be"
7	7	"Cancelled"	Dez McCarthy	Holly Phillips	4 November 2016	4 November 2016	0.20	0.78
Ben quits working for the lodge, and begs Ben to come back, but when a camera drone follows them to Skye's secret place, Skye cancels the reality series. Christina and the crew move out of the lodge and Danielle loses her job. Kyle and Aaron pretend to be plumbers to sneak around the North Star. Ben sees Skye and Sean hug during a pizza night at the lodge, and Danielle discovers that Gil and Olivia plan on turning the North Star into apartments. Featured songs: "Favourite Place to Be" and "Something About Me"
8	8	"Wishful Thinking"	Dez McCarthy	Bronagh Taggart	11 November 2016	11 November 2016	0.15	0.78
Skye, Noah, Kaylee, Sean and Oz go on a camping trip, which Ben and Danielle crash. Danielle tells Sean about Gil and Olivia's plans for the North Star. Oz accidentally reveals that Kaylee is going to music school, and the group congratulate her. The group write their wishes on pieces of paper and send them down the river, and when Kaylee finds Noah's paper, it reveals he wants her to stay and be together. When Skye returns from the camping trip, she finds Kyle and Aaron spying on her, who reveal that their boss is "SJ", Samuel James. Featured songs: "Tell It Like It Is – Boys Duet" and "What I've Been Wishin' For"
9	9	"The Truth"	Dez McCarthy	Lee Walters	18 November 2016	18 November 2016	0.12	0.68
Skye meets Samuel, who explains that her grandfather forbid her mother from dating him due to a fire at the lodge. Gil and Danielle tell Sean to convince Skye to sell the North Star, but when Josh overhears he plans for apartments to be built there, he calls Ben, who tells Skye. Ben explains to her that Sean would not have gone through with it, and that she needs to choose him or Sean. Featured songs: "Tell It Like It Is – Duet" and "What I've Been Wishing For"
10	10	"The Choice"	Dez McCarthy	Lee Walters	25 November 2016	25 November 2016	0.12	0.60
Skye arranges a concert to fundraise money to save the North Star. After Noah tries to kiss Kaylee, Oz and his band leave. When Olivia finds out about the concert, she tries to shut it down due to Skye not having a live music licence, but Danielle convinces her to let the concert go ahead. Afterwards, Skye sends a text to Sean and Ben telling them who she chose, and Danielle finds a treasure map in the back of Skye's ukulele. Featured songs: "Never Let You Go" and "Bringing Better Back"

=== Series 2 (2017) ===
No. overall	No. in season	Title	Directed by	Written by	Original release date	UK viewers (millions)
11	1	"I Choose You"	Dez McCarthy	Lee Walters	9 June 2017	0.14
Josh begins hosting Live at the Lodge, a reality series controlled by and based on the people at the North Star. Kaylee leaves for music school, and struggles to make friends, until fellow student Frankie approaches her. Skye reveals that she chose Sean, and tries to make amends with Ben. Danielle shares the treasure map with Ben. Gil arrives at the lodge and explains that he went above Olivia and reported Skye for not having a live music licence, and presents her with a choice: pay the fine, or sell the North Star to him. Featured songs: "It's My Time" and "There For You"
12	2	"Partners"	Dez McCarthy	Bronagh Taggart	16 June 2017	0.08
Ed hosts interviews for a new staff member. Alex, one of the applicants, scares away the other applicants and gets the job. Skye and Sean have their first date. Kaylee gets closer to Frankie, who proposes that they meet with a music producer. Danielle and Ben follow the map and become trapped in a cave, with no phone service. Song featured: "Watch Me"
13	3	"Help"	Dez McCarthy	Paul Gerstenberger	23 June 2017	0.11
Trapped in the cave, Danielle and Ben leave a voicemail for Sean, who comes with Skye to rescue them. Danielle and Ben open the box they found, which has a piece of paper with a phone number on. Alex overhears Ed talking to Gil about the potential sale, and when Josh pressures her for gossip on camera, she blurts out about the North Star being sold. Ed begins a crowdfund to save the lodge. Josh confides in Noah that he is gay. Featured songs: "It's Always Been You" and "Figure It Out – Danielle Version"
14	4	"Call Me"	Dez McCarthy	Zoe Lister	30 June 2017	0.12
Kaylee and Frankie record a demo for "Watch Me", a song Kaylee wrote, but Rebecca, a music producer, changes the melody and cuts Kaylee's voice out. While showing Gil around the North Star, Skye finds a flyer for a biking enduro. She encourages Sean to enter with her, to find money to fund paying for the fine. Ben takes the phone number to Skye, and when she calls the number, a ringtone is heard within the lodge. Featured songs: "Watch Me", "Watch Me – Frankie Version" and "It's Always Been You – Ben Version"
15	5	"Mystery Guest"	Dez McCarthy	Scott Payne	7 July 2017	0.09
Ben and Noah search the room of a man believing he is behind the phone number, but when Skye confronts him, he explains that he works for the council, and stays at the North Star annually to check on the rare species of bats in the loft. Skye texts the number, and it is revealed that it is Alex. Kaylee visits Noah and the group, and phones Rebecca to tell her that she cannot use Frankie's version of "Watch Me". Featured songs: "Figure It Out – Kaylee Version" and "There For You"
16	6	"The Last Dance"	Julie Edwards	James Whitehouse & Hannah George	14 July 2017	0.14
The group host a danceathon to raise money to pay the fine, which Kaylee and Noah win. When the time runs out, the target was not hit, and they lose the money donated. Skye calls the number and when Alex answers, she explains that the map and phone belonged to her grandfather. Alex asks Danielle what happened to the box she found, and is upset when Danielle says she got rid of it. Featured songs: "Over Til It's Over" and "There For You"
17	7	"I'll Huff and I'll Puff"	Julie Edwards	Lee Walters	14 July 2017	0.13
Gil arranges to tear down the North Star with a bulldozer, and when Skye finds out, she locks herself in one of the bedrooms. Sean, Noah, Kaylee, Ben, Danielle and Alex join her. Danielle takes the keys to the bulldozers, but despite their efforts, Gil arranges for the North Star to be bulldozed. Featured songs: "Favourite Place to Be" and "Get My Way"
18	8	"No Hard Feelings"	Julie Edwards	Bronagh Taggart	8 September 2017	0.06
The council worker arrives at the lodge and enforces a ban on demolishing it, due to a protection being placed on the rare species of bat in the loft. Gil enlists Sean, Noah and Ben to clear up the North Star, but when they play in the river, Gil is disappointed with Sean, and informs him that the Matthews family are taking over the lodge. Skye, Danielle and Alex team up and discover that the treasure is buried on an island called Solus. Kaylee is upset to find out that Frankie has stolen her song, which has become a viral hit. Featured songs: "Watch Me – Kaylee Version", "Step Up" and "Watch Me – Frankie Version"
19	9	"Under New Management"	Julie Edwards	Bronagh Titley	15 September 2017	0.12
Having set up the lodge, Gil and Ella expect Sean to help them assist visitors. When Ed begins working there to pay the bills, Skye is upset with him. Skye, Danielle and Alex set sail to Solus with Ben. Noah calls Frankie from Kaylee's phone, and lets her know that Kaylee is disappointed with her behaviour. When Kaylee finds out, she is annoyed with Noah. Songs featured: "Step Up" and "Wherever We Go From Here"
20	10	"The Storm"	Julie Edwards	Sarah Courtauld	22 September 2017	0.09
In Solus, Alex wanders from the team to attempt finding the treasure, but they find her. Hearing there will be a storm at Solus, Sean joins the group there, and they stay in an abandoned cottage. Ben and Danielle almost kiss, but they are interrupted by Sean. Alex finds a photo of her younger self in the cottage, sat with another young girl. When Skye sees, she identifies herself, and the pair wonder how they knew each other. Featured songs: "We Just Might Get Along" and "Wherever We Go From Here"
21	11	"Taking Sides"	Max Myers	Paul Gerstenberger	29 September 2017	0.11
Gil hears that Live at the Lodge has won an award, and invites Skye to accept it at an event. Noah and Kaylee tell Skye about the decrease in profits Gil is facing, and he asks Skye to come back and run the North Star with Ed. Danielle confesses to Skye that Gil is after the treasure, and cannot be trusted. When Skye goes on stage, she tells the audience that she will never work for Gil, and will get the North Star back. Noah informs Kaylee that Frankie is headlining the enduro concert. Featured songs: "Figure It Out – Danielle Version" and "Get My Way"
22	12	"Hard to Say No"	Max Myers	Scott Payne	6 October 2017	0.08
Skye and Sean compete in the enduro, where they meet competitors Jess and Max. During the race, Max injures himself, and his manager asks Sean to partner with Jess. Sean accepts, which Skye sees. Ed tells Alex that her and Skye are cousins, which makes Danielle feel excluded from the group. Kaylee confronte Frankie, who apologises for stealing "Watch Me" and invites Kaylee to join her on stage at the enduro concert. Featured songs: "It's Always Been You" and "Watch Me"
23	13	"Distant Relations"	Max Myers	Neil Jones	13 October 2017	0.15
A clue takes Danielle, Alex and Skye up to the loft of the North Star, where they find a painting. Danielle misses a meeting with Ben, and she finds him with Skye. Noah explains to Kaylee that Frankie cannot be trusted. When Ed explains to Ben that Skye put in a lot of work for the enduro, he enters himself as Skye's partner. Featured songs: "Step Up – Jess Version" and "There For You"
24	14	"Finish Line"	Max Myers	Kirstie Falkous	27 October 2017	0.11
Frankie assures Noah that she will tell the audience about "Watch Me" being stolen from Kaylee, but she performs the song as planned. Kaylee turns the stage machinery off, and demands that she tell the truth, and when Frankie does, Kaylee performs the song. Danielle confronts Ben about his relationship with Skye, and asks where she stands with him. Skye ends her relationship with Sean, and Ben says that he knows where the gold is from looking at the painting. Featured songs: "Watch Me – Frankie Version" and "Watch Me – Kaylee Version"
25	15	"The North Star"	Max Myers	Lee Walters	3 November 2017	0.10
Sean agrees to go on a bike tour with Jess, and she tells him that if he has unfinished business, then to sort it. Noah gets into the music school that Kaylee is attending, and the pair agree to do it together. Alex, Ben, Danielle, Josh and Skye go to an observatory for the treasure, where they find a gold medal. Skye takes it to Gil to buy the North Star, but he explains that it has already been sold to two business partners, which are later revealed to be Kaylee and Ed, since Frankie gave the royalties from "Watch Me" to Kaylee. Sean leaves for the bike tour, and Skye races to find Ben. Ben is at the boathouse with Danielle, who is asking when they can reveal their relationship. They kiss, which Skye sees. When he notices Skye watching, he points out that the North Star is on fire. Featured songs: "Wherever We Go From Here" and "Blue Skies"

== Production ==
In July 2015, Disney Channel UK gave the green light for the production of the series The Lodge, which had the working title of North Star. For the first series, 13 episodes were originally announced, each with a running time of 22 minutes, though the amount was later reduced to 10 episodes. The main character, Skye, was originally named Maia, like in the Israeli Disney Channel original series North Star. The series The Lodge, filmed in Northern Ireland, takes place in the county of County Down. Most of the scenes are filmed in Montalto Estate and at The Carriage Rooms, which are in Ballynahinch.

On 13 December 2016, it was announced that the series was renewed for a second series, which premiered in 2017. On 21 February 2017, it was announced that production had begun on the second series and it would consist of 15 episodes.

The Lodge features the first coming out scene in a Disney Channel series: in a 2017 episode, Josh (Joshua Sinclair-Evans) mentions that girls aren't his type.

== Music ==
Title
Details
Track listing
The Lodge
- Released: 26 September 2016
- Label: Walt Disney Records
- Format: CD, digital download

No.	Title	Length
1.	"Starting Over, Starting Now"	2:12
2.	"Believe That"	2:56
3.	"If You Only Knew"	3:53
4.	"Favourite Place to Be"	2:21
5.	"Something About Me"	2:06
6.	"Tell It Like It Is"	3:01
7.	"If You Only Knew (Duet)"	3:16
8.	"Never Let You Go"	2:46
9.	"What I've Been Wishin' For"	3:39
10.	"Bringing Better Back"	2:49
11.	"Tell It Like It Is (Duet)"	3:01
12.	"Believe That (Acoustic Version)"	1:52
13.	"If You Only Knew (Acoustic Version)"	3:15
14.	"Tell It Like It Is (Boys Duet)"	1:01
15.	"Starting Over, Starting Now (Ballad)"	0:46
16.	"If You Only Knew (Cutmore Radio Edit)"	4:00
17.	"Believe That (Wideboys Bass Funk Mix)"	2:45
Total length:		45:45

The Lodge: Season 2
- Released: 1 September 2017
- Label: Walt Disney Records
- Format: CD, digital download

No.	Title	Length
1.	"It's My Time"	2:39
2.	"There For You"	3:31
3.	"Figure It Out – Danielle Version"	3:02
4.	"Watch Me – Kaylee Version"	3:09
5.	"It's Always Been You"	2:50
6.	"Over Til It's Over"	2:59
7.	"Get My Way"	2:39
8.	"Figure It Out – Kaylee Version"	2:56
9.	"It's Always Been You – Ben Version"	1:04
10.	"Step Up – Jess Version"	2:48
11.	"Wherever We Go From Here"	2:44
12.	"Watch Me – Frankie Version"	2:50
13.	"Just Might Get Along"	2:24
14.	"Blue Skies"	2:52
15.	"Wherever We Go From Here"	2:50
16.	"Step Up"	2:48
17.	"Figure It Out – Josh Version"	1:12
18.	"It's Always Been You – Ballad"	1:16
Total length:		46:41

== Broadcast and release ==
The pilot episode of The Lodge, "The New Girl", was released online in the UK on 8 September 2016, more than two weeks before its television premiere. The first series premiered in the United States on Disney Channel on 17 October 2016. At the end of 2016 and beginning of 2017, the series was released in 108 additional countries within the EMEA region. The series has since been made available on the streaming service Disney+.

== Ratings ==
=== UK ratings ===
Viewership and ratings per season of The Lodge
Season	Episodes	First aired		Last aired		Avg. viewers (millions)
Season	Episodes	Date	Viewers (millions)	Date	Viewers (millions)	Avg. viewers (millions)
1	10	23 September 2016	0.26	25 November 2016	0.12	0.17
2	15	9 June 2017	0.14	3 November 2017	0.10	0.11

=== U.S. ratings ===
Viewership and ratings per season of The Lodge
Season	Episodes	First aired		Last aired		Avg. viewers (millions)
Season	Episodes	Date	Viewers (millions)	Date	Viewers (millions)	Avg. viewers (millions)
1	10	17 October 2016	0.80	25 November 2016	0.60	0.73
