= Gil Dor =

Israeli guitarist, arranger, composer and accompanist (b. 1952)

Gil Dor גיל דור
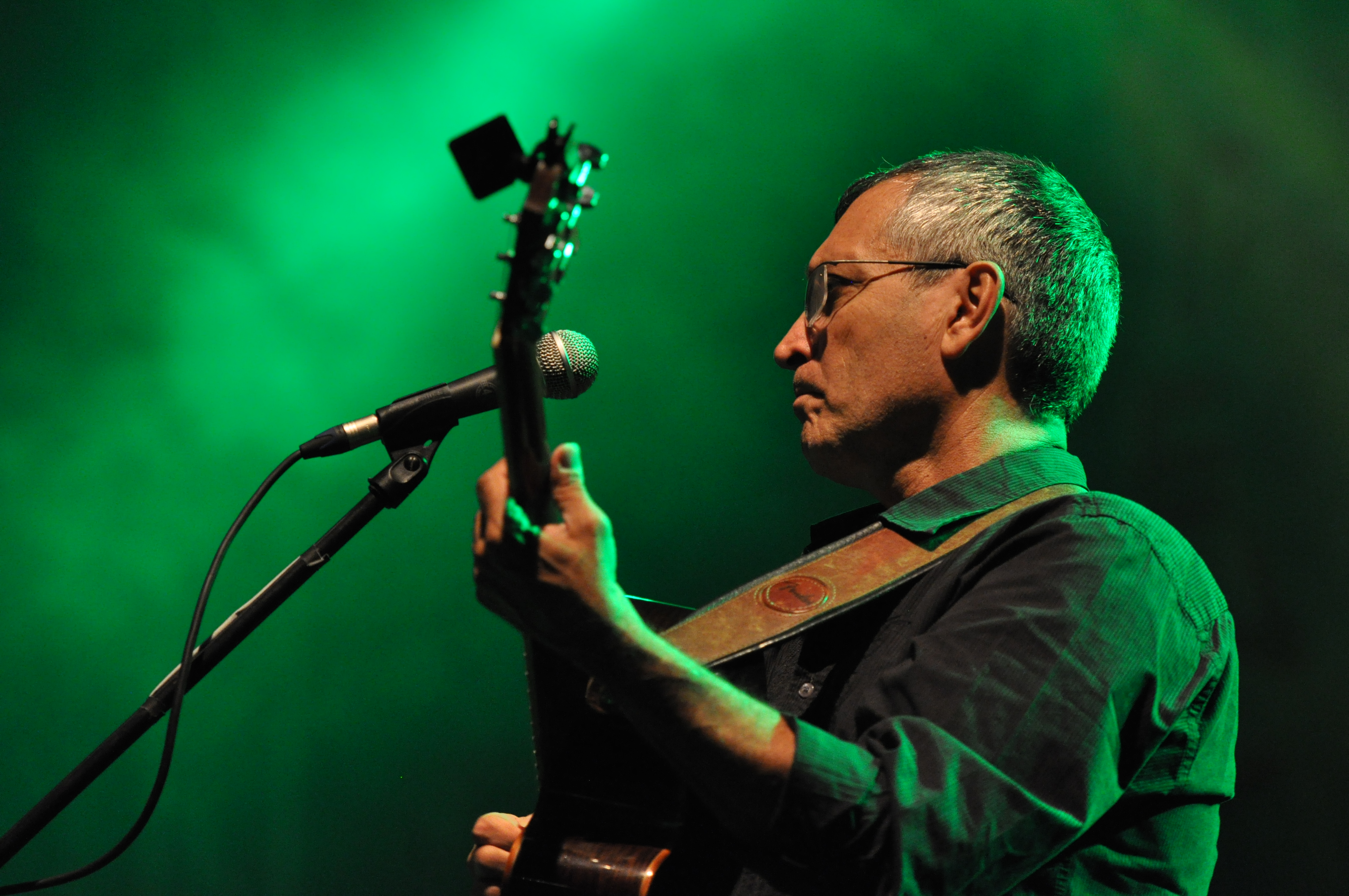
- Gil Dor 2014 at the Bardentreffen music festival in Nuremberg

Background information
- Born: December 12, 1952 (age 73)
- Origin: Holon, Israel
- Genres: Pop, world, Hebrew, jazz, blues
- Occupation: Singer
- Years active: 1981–present

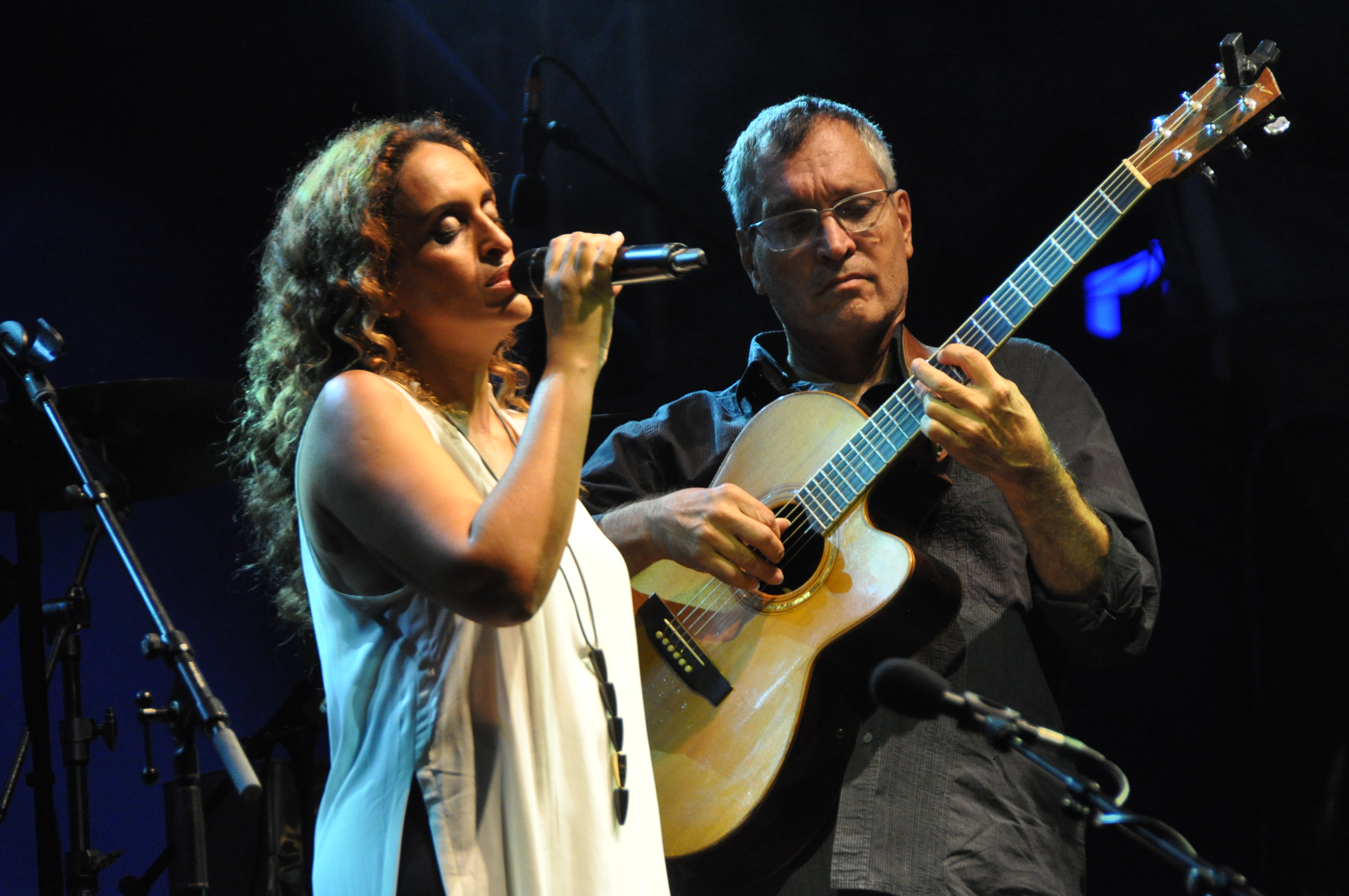
Gil Dor with Achinoam Nini 2014 at the Bardentreffen festival

Gil Dor (Hebrew: גיל דור; born December 12, 1952) is an Israeli guitar player mostly known for his long-term collaboration as an accompanist, arranger, producer and co-composer with international concert and recording artist Achinoam Nini, also known as Noa.

== Early life and education ==
Dor grew up in Holon. His parents were both amateur pianists, and favored his approach to music very early in life. After taking piano lessons with his brother Yuval (who played in Hakol Over Habibi), he started studying guitar at eleven years old, first as a self-taught musician, and later with the Israeli classical guitar master Menashe Bakish, with whom he studied for eight years. He served in the Central Command Band for his military service. When he finished his army service in 1974, he went to Boston with his wife Neta, and attended Berklee College of Music. In 1975, Dor moved to New York City where he studied at Queens College and worked until 1981.

== Music career ==
In 1981, Dor moved back to Israel, and soon became a working session musician as well as an active jazz guitarist in the national scene. He also played with Israeli rock star Shalom Hanoch. In 1985, he co-founded the Rimon school of music, was elected dean of curriculum and taught there while continuing his activity as session musician, jazz artist, and composer for video and theater. During the summer of 1986 and 1987 he toured with guitarist Al Di Meola in Europe. In October 1989 Gil met Noa who came to study at the Rimon School of Jazz and Contemporary Music. From that moment, Dor's concert and recording activities have been deeply linked to hers.

== Instrumentation ==
- Acoustic guitar custom built for him by Linda Manzer with 0.12 phosphor bronze strings (D'Addario or Elixir)
- Gibson L-5 electric jazz guitar
- Manne semi-acoustic guitar

== Discography ==
=== With Achinoam Nini ===
- Achinoam Nini and Gil Dor Live (July 1991)
- Achinoam Nini and Gil Dor (September 1993)
- Noa (March 1994)
- Calling (May 1996)
- Achinoam Nini (April 1997)
- Achinoam Nini & the Israel Philharmonic Orchestra (April 1998)
- Blue Touches Blue (March 2000)
- First Collection (March 2001)
- Now (September 2002)
- Noa Gold (October 2003)
- Noa Live – DVD/Double CD with the Solis Quartet (October 2005)
- Genes & Jeans (April 2008)
- There Must Be Another Way (2009)
- The Israeli Songbook (2011)
- Love Medicine (2014)
- Letters to Bach (2019)
- Afterallogy (2021)
- The Giver And The See (2026)

== See also ==
- List of Queens College people
