= Joshua Sinclair-Evans =

English actor

- Born: 29 March 1995 (age 31); London, England
- Education: ArtsEd
- Occupation: Actor
- Years active: 2015–present
- Television: The Lodge

Joshua Sinclair-Evans (born 29 March 1995) is an English actor. He is known for portraying the role of Josh in the Disney Channel musical series The Lodge.

== Life and career ==
Sinclair-Evans began performing from an early age, and studying musical theatre and acting at Arts Educational. He made his acting debut in theatre productions such as The Tempest, Find Me and The Distance. He is also trained in playing the piano, guitar and ukulele.

Sinclair-Evans made his television debut in the Disney Channel musical drama The Lodge. He portrayed the main role of Josh, starring in 25 episodes. His character had the first coming out scene to be aired on Disney Channel. In 2018, Sinclair-Evans made an appearance in an episode of BBC medical drama Casualty, as Sheridan Taylor. Later that year, he appeared as Shane in Free Dance. In July 2019, he appeared as Josh Scarino in Spider-Man: Far From Home.

== Filmography ==
Year	Title	Role	Notes
2016–2017	The Lodge	Josh	Main role
2018	Casualty	Sheridan Taylor	1 episode
2018	High Strung Free Dance	Shane	Film
2019	Spider-Man: Far From Home	Josh Scarino	Film
2019	Ruth	Joel	Short film
2025	The War Between the Land and the Sea	Salt (Male)	Episode: “Plastic Apocalypse”
