= Pornsak Pichetshote =

Thai-American comic and television writer

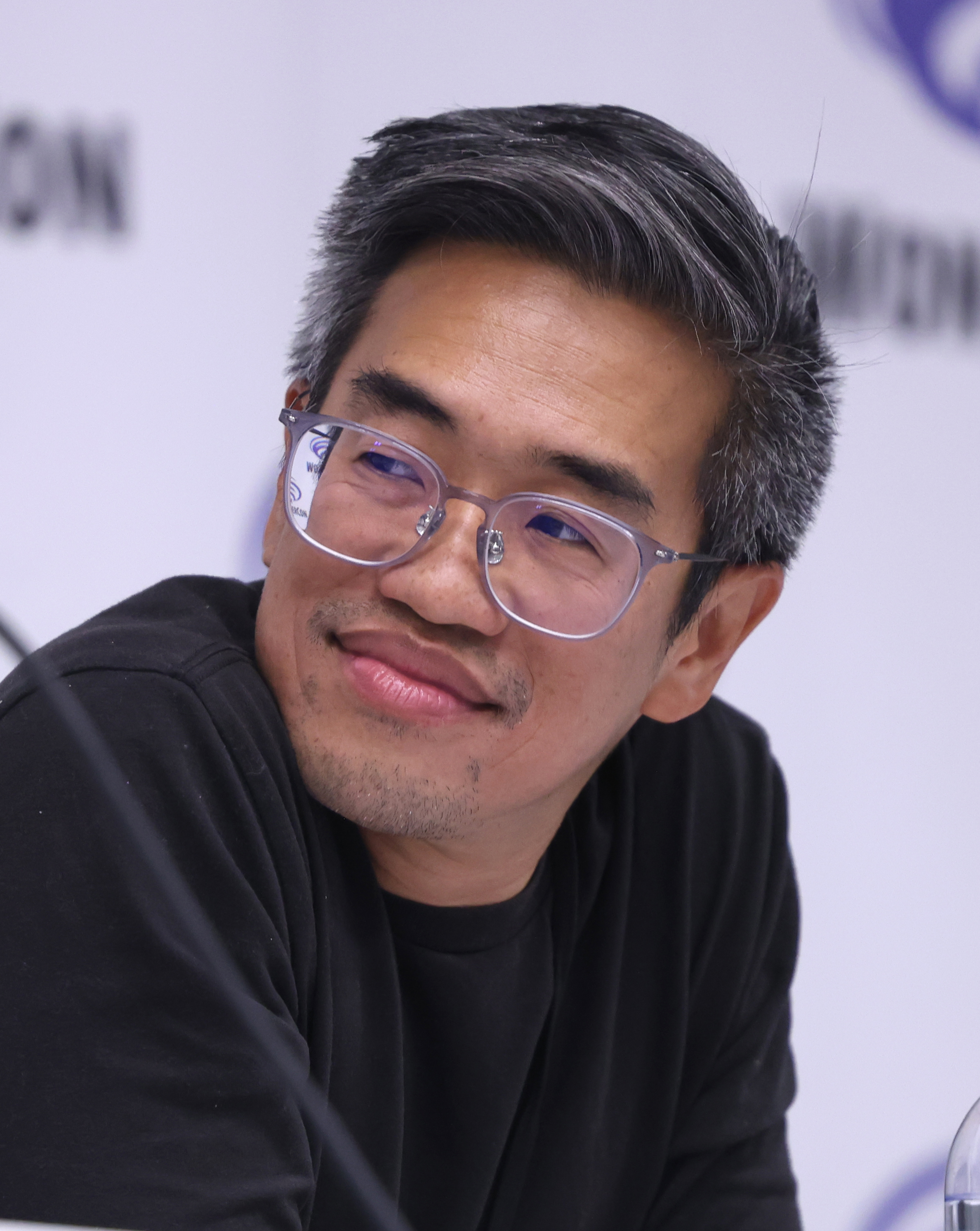
- Pichetshote in 2026
- Born: Pornsak Pichetshote
- Areas: Writer, Editor
- Notable works: Infidel, The Good Asian, Sandman Universe: Dead Boy Detectives, Man's Best, Absolute Green Arrow
- Awards: 2022 Eisner Award for Best Limited Series; 2022 Harvey Award for Book of the Year

Pornsak Pichetshote is a Thai-American television and comics writer, editor, director, and producer who has worked for Vertigo, DC Comics, Marvel Comics, and independent comics. He has been nominated for Eisner and Harvey Awards.

== Early life ==
Pichetshote was born in the United States. He moved to Thailand when he was twelve, and then moved back to attend college in the U.S.

== Career ==
Pichetshote started working in comics as an editor at Vertigo Comics, an imprint of DC, where he worked on books like Daytripper, The Unwritten, Sweet Tooth, The Unknown Soldier, and Swamp Thing. During his time working at DC, he slowly became the head of DC's TV division and helped Geoff Johns spearhead what became known as the Arrowverse. Per Pichetshote: "All of a sudden, I was recruited because I knew stuff about the comic side. And then I would end up becoming part of that think tank and I would slowly end up being sort of DC Comics' head of television. I would help develop The Arrowverse on The CW and a bunch of other shows. And that happened for a while."

In 2012, he directed a nine-minute short film called A Conversation About Cheating With My Time Travelling Future Self which was an official selection at the 9th annual International Horror & Sci-Fi Film Festival in Phoenix in 2013.

In 2018, he wrote, Infidel, with artist Aaron Campbell, publishing it through Image Comics. The book is a haunted house story, but set in a modern run-down apartment building and the main character is a Muslim woman dealing with racism and Islamaphobia. The book was optioned by TriStar Pictures after two issues. After that, he was a writer on the second seasons of Marvel's Cloak & Dagger, Two Sentence Horror Stories, and Light as a Feather.

In 2021, he wrote The Good Asian, about Chinese-American detective Edison Hark on the streets of 1936 Chinatown. With art by Alexandre Tefenkgi, the book is a noir set during a period of extreme xenophobia and racism. It would go on to win the 2022 Eisner Award for Best Limited Series and the 2022 Harvey Award for Book of the Year.

In 2023, he wrote The Sandman Universe: Dead Boy Detectives, a six-issue limited series with artist Jeff Stokely. The next year, he teamed up with artist Jesse Lonergan to put out Man's Best, a five-issue series through Boom! Studios about a group of emotional support pets in space who have to save their owners. The book was listed by Parade as one of the best books of December 2024.

In 2024, Pichetshote launched The Horizon Experiment with Image Comics, a series of five one-shots written by writers of color and starring protagonists from marginalized backgrounds. The first one-shot, The Manchurian, was written by Pichetshote with art by Terry Dodson and was about a "Chinese James Bond." Other writers for the project include Sabir Pirzada, Tananarive Due, J. Holtham, and Vita Ayala.

In July 2025, it was announced that Pichetshote would write Absolute Green Arrow, a six-issue miniseries illustrated by Rafael Albuquerque and set in the Absolute Universe. The series follows Dinah Lance as she investigates the murder of several corrupt billionaires, with each victim carrying the same green arrows protruding from their bodies, and how these deaths are connected to the murder of Oliver Queen. The first issue was released on May 20, 2026.

== Bibliography ==
=== DC Comics ===
- Absolute Green Arrow #1 (2026)
- Absolute Power: Task Force VII #4 (2024)
- DC Festival of Heroes: The Asian Superhero Celebration #1, short story "Perceptible" (2021)
- DC Love is a Battlefield #1, short story "Able" (2021)
- Flashpoint: Green Arrow Industries #1 (2011)
- The Sandman Universe: Dead Boy Detectives #1−6 (2022−2023)

=== Marvel Comics ===
- Alien: Black, White & Blood #4, short story "Mother" (2024)
- Doctor Strange Annual vol. 3 #1, short story "Treat" (2019)
- Marvel's Voices: Identity vol. 2 #1, short story "Secrets" (2022)

=== Other Companies ===
==== Image Comics ====
- Geiger 80-Page Giant #1, short story "Goldbeard's" (2022)
- The Good Asian #1−10 (2021−2022)
- Infidel #1−5 (2018)
- The Silver Coin #14 (2022)
- Exquisite Corpses #3, #8 (2025)

==== Boom! Studios ====
- Man's Best #1−5 (2024)
