= Dead Boy Detectives (TV series) =

American supernatural horror television series

- Genre: Comedy-drama; Occult detective; Supernatural horror
- Based on: Dead Boy Detectives by: Neil Gaiman; Matt Wagner
- Developed by: Steve Yockey
- Showrunners: Steve Yockey; Beth Schwartz
- Starring: George Rexstrew; Jayden Revri; Kassius Nelson; Briana Cuoco; Ruth Connell; Yuyu Kitamura; Jenn Lyon
- Music by: Blake Neely; Murat Selçuk
- Country of origin: United States
- Original language: English
- No. of episodes: 8

Production
- Executive producers: Neil Gaiman; David Madden; Lee Toland Krieger; Jeremy Carver; Beth Schwartz; Steve Yockey; Sarah Schechter; Greg Berlanti; Leigh London Redman
- Producers: Joanie Woehler; Carl Ogawa; Chris Pavoni; Kristy Lowrey; Joshua Conkel
- Production location: Langley, Canada
- Cinematography: Pierre Gill; Marc Laliberté; Craig Powell
- Editors: Brian Wessel; Troy Takaki; Imelda Betiong
- Running time: 52–56 minutes
- Production companies: Berlanti Productions; Ghost Octopus; DC Entertainment; Warner Bros. Television

Original release
- Network: Netflix
- Release: April 25, 2024

Related
- The Sandman

Dead Boy Detectives is an American supernatural horror detective comedy-drama television series developed by Steve Yockey based on the DC Comics characters of the same name by Neil Gaiman and Matt Wagner. The series stars George Rexstrew, Jayden Revri, Kassius Nelson, Briana Cuoco, Ruth Connell, Yuyu Kitamura and Jenn Lyon, and follows Charles Rowland and Edwin Payne, who decided not to enter the afterlife and instead stay on Earth to investigate crimes that involve the supernatural.

Plans for a television series began in September 2021, when a pilot was ordered by HBO Max for a series based on the Dead Boy Detectives comics. The series was given greenlight by April 2022. However, it was moved to Netflix in February 2023. Gaiman later confirmed the series is set in the same continuity as The Sandman, with Kirby and Donna Preston reprising their respective roles as Death and Despair in the series.

Dead Boy Detectives premiered on Netflix on April 25, 2024. The series received generally positive reviews from critics, who praised its writing, directing and tone, as well as the performances of the cast and visuals. In August 2024, the series was canceled after one season.

== Premise ==
The series follows the ghosts of Charles Rowland and Edwin Payne, who decided not to enter the afterlife and instead stayed on Earth to investigate crimes involving the supernatural.

== Cast and characters ==
=== Main ===
- George Rexstrew as Edwin Payne, a ghost detective who was killed in 1916 when his classmates performed a sacrifice ritual as a prank, only to inadvertently summon a demon who took him to Hell
- Jayden Revri as Charles Rowland, Edwin's partner at the Agency who died in 1989 from hypothermia and internal bleeding after his classmates turned on him when he defended a Pakistani boy who was being bullied
- Kassius Nelson as Crystal Palace, a psychic medium who can see and communicate with ghosts
- Briana Cuoco as Jenny Green, owner of the Tongue & Tail butcher shop. She rents out the upstairs rooms to Crystal and Niko
- Ruth Connell as Night Nurse, the being who runs the Afterlife's Lost and Found Department, handling misplaced dead children. Connell previously played the role of the Night Nurse in the Doom Patrol episode "Dead Patrol" – the first TV appearance of the Dead Boy Detectives
- Yuyu Kitamura as Niko Sasaki, a young girl and anime fan who lives across the hall from Crystal. She becomes able to see ghosts after a near-death experience
- Jenn Lyon as Esther Finch, an immortal witch living in Port Townsend who seeks revenge against the Dead Boy Detectives

=== Recurring ===
- David Iacono as David the Demon, a demon who previously possessed Crystal and now stalks her
- Lukas Gage as the Cat King, a magical cat able to take on human form, who puts a spell on Edwin that prevents him from leaving Port Townsend
- Michael Beach as Tragic Mick, a walrus cursed into human form who runs a shop selling magical artifacts
- Joshua Colley as Monty, Esther's crow familiar, whom she transforms into a teenage boy
- Max Jenkins as Kingham, one of two Dandelion Sprites who once possessed Niko. It is now kept in an enchanted jar.
- Caitlin Reilly as Litty, the other Dandelion Sprite
- Lindsey Gort as Maxine, a librarian at the Port Townsend Public Library

=== Notable guest stars ===
- Sherri Saum as Maddy Surname, Crystal's wealthy but absent mother. She works at the British Museum.
- Gabriel Drake as Simon, one of Edwin's classmates
- John Brotherton as Seth von Hoverkraft, Crystal's wealthy but absent father, who also works at the British Museum
- Tamlyn Tomita as The Principal, the Night Nurse's superior at the Afterlife's Lost and Found Department

==== Appearing from The Sandman ====
The following actors reprise their roles from The Sandman:

- Kirby (Note: Kirby Howell-Baptiste is credited as "Kirby" in this show.) as Death, a member of the Endless that the Dead Boy Detectives work to evade
- Donna Preston as Despair, a member of the Endless whom Edwin encounters in Hell

== Episodes ==
No.	Title	Directed by	Written by	Original release date	Prod. code
1	"The Case of Crystal Palace"	Lee Toland Krieger	Steve Yockey	April 25, 2024	T11.10148
In London, ghosts Edwin Payne and Charles Rowland are the Dead Boy Detective Agency, solving supernatural cases while hiding from Death. After helping a World War I-era spirit move on to his afterlife, they rescue psychic medium Crystal Palace from her ex-boyfriend David, a demon who steals her memories. A poster of missing girl scout Becky Aspen leads the trio to Port Townsend, Washington, where Crystal rents a room above Jenny Green's butcher shop and meets fellow tenant Niko Sasaki. Psychically stalked by David, Crystal learns that Edwin was killed by bullying classmates in a botched summoning of the demon Sa'al and trapped in Hell for seventy years. With Crystal's help and information extracted from a stray cat, they rescue Becky from Esther Finch, a witch who kidnaps young girls to maintain her youth and feed her gigantic snake. Esther overpowers the boys but Crystal invades her mind, seeing Esther with the dark goddess Lilith in an ocean of blood. Charles briefly possesses Esther, allowing them to escape and Becky, all memory of her captivity erased, is reunited with her parents. Meanwhile, Charles' possession of Esther alerts the Afterlife's Lost and Found Department to the Dead Boy Detectives' location.
2	"The Case of the Dandelion Shrine"	Glen Winter	Shoshana Sachi & Cheech Manohar	April 25, 2024	T12.17652
The trio is brought before the Cat King, who is fascinated by Edwin and locks a bracelet on his wrist — a caging spell to keep him in Port Townsend; Edwin may break the spell by responding to the King's attraction, or by counting every cat in the city. The boys find no solution at Tragic Mick's magic shop, but are given an enchanted glass globe holding the sounds of the sea. Niko collapses after projecting colorful visions, and the boys determine she is possessed by deadly, attention-seeking Dandelion Sprites from a forest shrine. They learn the creatures can be contained by the shrine's enchanted vessel, but Charles accidentally breaks it. To save Niko, Crystal offers herself as a new host for the Sprites, Kingham and Litty, but Edwin traps them in the enchanted jar. Thanks to her near-death experience, a now white-haired Niko can see Edwin and Charles, who are flooded with mail as ghostly clients line up at their door. Meanwhile, a vengeful Esther turns her crow familiar, Monty, into a young human, and the Afterlife's Night Nurse sets out to retrieve the fugitive detectives.
3	"The Case of the Devlin House"	Cheryl Dunye	Ian Weinreich & Kristy Lowrey	April 25, 2024	T12.17653
The detectives screen potential clients, including new ghost Susan Kessler, whose brother-in-law Brandon Devlin killed her sister Stacy and their daughters, Hope and Hannah, in a murder-suicide thirty years ago, leaving a malevolent presence in their house. Jealous of Charles' sexual tension with Crystal, Edwin researches the case with Niko at the local library and meets Monty, who can see Edwin. Secretly monitored by cats sent by the Cat King, Crystal and the boys investigate the Devlins' home, where the family's ghosts continuously relive the murders. Reminded of his own abusive father, Charles is trapped in the loop when he tries to intervene. Edwin and Crystal discover a secret surveillance room Brandon used to spy on his family, where a Misery Wraith has been feeding on the ghosts' pain. Inside Crystal's mind, David offers to help in exchange for re-possessing her, but Edwin erases the surveillance tape of the murders, freeing the family and trapping the wraith. The detectives escape before Death arrives, and they encounter Monty, who continues to flirt with Edwin. Meanwhile, the Night Nurse questions the Devlin daughters about the "heroes" who saved them.
4	"The Case of the Lighthouse Leapers"	Andi Armaganian	Joshua Conkel & Kristin Layne Tucker	April 25, 2024	T12.17654
Crystal and Niko learn Jenny is receiving letters from a secret admirer, and a ghost named Dagfinn hires the detectives to investigate two suicides at his lighthouse. They witness a third person leap into the sea to their death, but the police refuse to believe them, and the leapers' ghosts reveal they were drawn by the voices of loved ones. The Cat King makes further advances on Edwin, and Niko saves Crystal from jumping after her mother's voice. Using a piece of red sea glass, the group summons a spirit known as the Washer Woman, who explains that a sea monster is responsible, and Tragic Mick provides them with a music box to lull the monster, Angie, to sleep. The Night Nurse arrives to take Edwin and Charles to their afterlives, forcing Charles to relive his worst memories, including his death at the hands of his classmates. Enraged, Charles knocks the Night Nurse off the cliff to be swallowed by Angie along with the music box. Later, Tragic Mick scours the shore for more sea glass, and Edwin joins Niko as she finally reads her estranged mother's letters, while Charles and Crystal give in to their mutual attraction and kiss.
5	"The Case of the Two Dead Dragons"	Amanda Tapping	Kelli Breslin & Jeremy Kaufman	April 25, 2024	T12.17655
Waking from a nightmare, Crystal decides she and Charles should remain just friends, and the detectives are hired by teenage ghosts Brad and Hunter, who believe they were murdered. Niko discovers that Jenny's admirer is librarian Maxine, and arranges a date for them at the butcher shop. The detectives interview Brad and Hunter's classmates, including Twitchy Richie, who points them to Brad's ex-girlfriend Shelby, who killed herself. Edwin summons Shelby's ghost, who explains that Brad and Hunter sabotaged her Olympics prospects but she did not kill them. Crystal is nearly poisoned by Brad's girlfriend Maren, and the detectives realize the truth: Brad shared Maren's private photos with Hunter, so she spiked their drinks to steal their phones; they died from the drinks, and Richie helped move their bodies. Maren turns herself in to the police, and Charles and Edwin confront Brad and Hunter, who are dragged to Hell. Jenny and Maxine's date goes well, until Jenny realizes the obsessive Maxine has been stalking her. Chasing Jenny with a cleaver, Maxine slips and impales her head on a spike. Ordered by Esther to win the detectives' trust, Monty kisses Edwin, who declares that he has feelings for someone else.
6	"The Case of the Creeping Forest"	Glen Winter	Beth Schwartz & Oscar Balderrama	April 25, 2024	T12.17656
Tragic Mick tells Crystal and Niko of the sea goddess Sedna who granted his wish, transforming him from a walrus to live among humans. They buy a "Light of Heart" artifact to protect Crystal from David, but she loses her psychic gifts as a result. Monty lures the detectives into Tall Forest, where ghosts have gone missing, but has a change of heart. They realize a fungal-like creature is consuming ghosts into nothingness, and David terrorizes Crystal until Charles dispatches him with his magic cricket bat. Edwin and Monty are confronted by the Cat King, who reveals Monty's true identity as Esther's crow, and Edwin's feelings for Charles. Esther tears apart Monty's human form before unleashing Teeth Face, a giant Forest Elemental. Deciphering the riddle given to her by the Washer Woman, Crystal communes with her ancestors and gains even greater powers, convincing Teeth Face to return to its realm with Esther in tow. Meanwhile, The Night Nurse is freed from inside Angie by Kashina, a mysterious traveller who gives her one of his rings. She is left unsure what to do with Charles and Edwin, but Edwin is suddenly dragged to Hell, leaving his journal behind.
7	"The Case of the Very Long Stairway"	Richard Speight Jr.	Steve Yockey	April 25, 2024	T12.17657
Crawling back to Earth, Esther costs the Cat King one of his nine lives. The Night Nurse is moved by Charles' memories of meeting Edwin; chased into freezing water by rock-throwing bullies, a dying Charles was befriended by Edwin, choosing to remain a ghost with him. The Night Nurse helps Charles descend into Hell, passing Maxine's spirit as he navigates using Edwin's journal. Edwin finds his schoolmate Simon facing eternal punishment for sacrificing Edwin, and briefly meets Despair of the Endless. Apologizing for tormenting Edwin due to unspoken feelings for him, Simon receives a peaceful end from Death. Crystal confronts David, who possesses Jenny but is left buried inside Crystal's mind. Esther demands a device from Tragic Mick to feed her powers using Edwin's pain. Charles finds Edwin being endlessly chased and devoured by a demon, and they flee through the levels of Gluttony, Lust, and Limbo. Edwin tells Charles that he loves him, and they narrowly escape back to Earth. Niko outwits the Night Nurse with her own rulebook, forcing her to leave to file additional paperwork before she can collect Charles and Edwin. Recovering the marbles containing her missing memories, Crystal swallows one.
8	"The Case of the Hungry Snake"	Pete Chatmon	Ross Maxwell	April 25, 2024	T12.17658
Crystal's memories reveal that she misused her abilities to hurt others. Remembering her full name, Crystal Palace Surname-Von Hoverkraft, she calls her wealthy parents, who had no idea she was missing. Esther's device drains a captive ghost to amplify her powers, and she prepares to take over the town. Jenny accepts the existence of the supernatural, and Crystal leaves to make amends for her old life, but Esther blows up the butcher shop, capturing Charles and Edwin. The Cat King reveals how Esther became a witch centuries ago and bargained with Lilith for immortality. Armed with black salt from Tragic Mick, and a lucky charm for Niko, Crystal is overpowered by Esther as she drains Edwin and kills Niko. Crystal calls on Lilith to avenge Esther's victims, while Charles is freed by Monty and kills the snake, and Lilith drags Esther away. Officially welcomed into the Dead Boy Detective Agency, Crystal invites Jenny to join them, and Edwin bids farewell to the Cat King. In London, Night Nurse's superior, the Principal, allows the boys to continue their work on earth, assigning Night Nurse as their chaperone. Somewhere in the Arctic, the Sprites sit with an unknown figure holding Niko's charm.

== Production ==
=== Development ===
On September 3, 2021, Variety reported that HBO Max ordered a pilot for a potential Dead Boy Detectives series, then-intended as a spin-off of Doom Patrol, with Steve Yockey as writer and executive-producer alongside Jeremy Carver, Greg Berlanti, Sarah Schechter, and David Madden. On April 14, 2022, HBO Max gave the production a series order, with Yockey set as showrunner; Beth Schwartz was attached as co-showrunner that September. By February 24, 2023, the project was moved from HBO Max to Netflix, reportedly due to being incompatible with DC Studios co-CEOs James Gunn and Peter Safran's plans to have HBO Max's DC shows be set in the DC Universe, as well as due to HBO Max's inability to air the series before 2024.

On April 20, 2023, Neil Gaiman confirmed the series would be set in the same universe as The Sandman; Gaiman was announced as an additional executive-producer that November. While the producers had always planned for the series to be set in the same universe as The Sandman, which aired on Netflix, Warner Bros. (parent of HBO Max, DC Comics Studios and Dead Boy Detectives publisher Vertigo Comics) did not allow them to use elements from that series when Dead Boy Detectives was still an HBO Max project, to avoid licensing issues with Netflix. As such, the showrunners instead included broad connections between both shows that still established them as part of the same continuity while only "lightly tipto[ing] around and through the Sandman universe". After the project moved to Netflix, the showrunners incorporated characters and more overt connection to The Sandman at the behest of both Netflix and Sandman showrunner Allan Heinberg. Dead Boy Detectives was released on Netflix on April 25, 2024.

=== Casting ===
In November 2021, George Rexstrew, Jayden Revri, Kassius Nelson, Alexander Calvert, Briana Cuoco, Ruth Connell, Yuyu Kitamura, and Jenn Lyon were cast. Lukas Gage replaced Calvert in September 2022. In October 2022, Michael Beach, Joshua Colley, and Lindsey Gort joined the cast in recurring capacities. A month later, Caitlin Reilly, Max Jenkins, and David Iacono were cast. In April 2024, Kirby said she would be reprising her Sandman role as Death; Kirby joined the cast for a cameo in the pilot following the series' move to Netflix, with the original iteration having Death appear offscreen due to licensing issues.

=== Filming ===
The pilot episode was filmed between December 2021 and January 2022, with Lee Toland Krieger directing and executive-producing. Filming for the series began on November 7, 2022, in Langley, British Columbia, and concluded on April 5, 2023.

=== Cancellation ===
On August 30, 2024, Netflix canceled the series after one season. In the weeks following cancellation, fans of the series on Tumblr and Twitter started the "Save Dead Boy Detectives Campaign" intending to get Netflix or another streaming service to renew the series for a second season. As of March 2025, the campaign is still ongoing and has crowdfunded billboards in Los Angeles and New York City, organized fan meetups, and garnered media attention. A petition for the show's renewal currently stands at more than 24,000 signatures.

== Reception ==
Dead Boy Detectives debuted at number two on Netflix's Top 10 TV English titles for the tracking week of April 22–28, 2024, with 22.2 million hours viewed. On the following week, it ranked at number three and garnered 34.1 million viewing hours. On its third week, the series came in at number seven, earning 13.3 million viewing hours.

=== Critical response ===
On the review aggregator website Rotten Tomatoes, 92% of 52 critics' reviews are positive, with an average rating of 7.5/10. The website's consensus reads: "Dead Boy Detectives expands the Sandman universe with an addictively entertaining paranormal fantasy with excitement, romance, and young adult angst to spare." Metacritic, which uses a weighted average, assigned the series a score of 65 out of 100, based on 19 critics, indicating "generally favorable" reviews.

Critical response to Dead Boy Detectives was largely positive, with critics lauding the show's whimsical tone and quirky sense of fun. Felipe Rangel of Screen Rant gave the series 9 out of 10 stars, noting that "Dead Boy Detectives is an exciting series with plenty of interesting mysteries and charismatic characters that keep you hooked every step of the way." Petrana Radulovic and Susana Polo of Polygon declared, "Dead Boy Detectives isn't just a great surprise for fans of the original comics; it should be a pleasant surprise to anyone looking for a great paranormal YA TV series."

Teen Vogue called the series one of the best Netflix shows of 2024, adding that "the chemistry between the two leads — George Rexstrew & Jayden Revri — was undeniable, and the story was both adventurous and heartfelt, exploring life after death in a fresh way." Entertainment Weekly lamented the cancellation, noting that "the show gave viewers magical fun, intriguing mystery, a bit of romance, and most of all, something that felt entirely unique." Robert Lloyd of the Los Angeles Times called Dead Boy Detectives "funny, terrifying, colorful, oddly lovely, [and] lovably odd," going on to add that it is "cleverly written, smartly cast, sensitively played, marvelously realized. It's disturbing at times, yet sweet at others, and comic as often as not."

Critics also heaped praise on the show's diversity and queer representation. Abbey White of The Hollywood Reporter lauded the show's diversity and cast chemistry, taking particular note of the "infectiously arresting screen dynamic" of the actors. Out heralded the series as the "queer supernatural mystery show of our dreams." In Q+ Magazine's glowing review, they noted, "In a television landscape hungry for diverse narratives, Dead Boy Detectives stands out as a beacon of inclusivity and imagination. Its seamless blend of supernatural intrigue, heartfelt friendships, and LGBTQ+ representation make it a must-watch for audiences craving a fresh take on the detective genre." Pride named it the number one LGBTQ+ show of 2024, declaring it "wildly creative, sweet, and unapologetically gay, gay, gay."

=== Awards and nominations ===
Dead Boy Detectives won the Rotten Tomatoes Golden Tomato Award for the Best Fantasy Series of 2024. Additionally, director Amanda Tapping won the DGC Award for Outstanding Directorial Achievement in a Dramatic Series for her work on Dead Boy Detectives episode 5, "The Case of the Two Dead Dragons".

Costume designer Kelli Dunsmore was nominated for a CAFTCAD Award for her work on episode 2, "The Case of the Dandelion Shrine", in the category of Costume Design in TV - Sci-Fi/Fantasy. Justice Joseph was also a finalist for the 2024 Concept Art Awards in the category of Live-Action Series Creatures for his work in designing the doll-spider.
