= George Rexstrew =

British actor

- Born: George Edward Rexstrew; 6 May 1994 (age 32)
- Education: University College, Durham; LAMDA
- Years active: 2020–present

George Edward Rexstrew (born 6 May 1994) is an English actor. He is known for his lead role in the Netflix series Dead Boy Detectives (2024).

== Early life ==
Rexstrew grew up in South West London.

Rexstrew graduated with a degree in modern languages from University College, Durham in 2017. During his time at Durham, he participated in student theatre. On a Leverhulme scholarship, he went on to complete a Master of Arts (MA) in Professional Acting at the London Academy of Music and Dramatic Art (LAMDA) in 2020.

== Career ==
Rexstrew has performed at the Edinburgh Fringe Festival and travelled to the US, touring as part of Durham University's Castle Theatre Company. He starred as Edwin Payne in Dead Boy Detectives, his first official TV acting role.

== Filmography ==
=== Series ===
Year	Title	Role	Notes
2024	Dead Boy Detectives	Edwin Payne	8 episodes

=== Short films ===
Year	Title	Role
2020	Still Here	Jack
2023	Findhorn Case 31.08.18	Fitzy
TBA	Pismo Beach	Barbara Lasagna
