= Jayden Revri =

British actor (born 1999)

- Born: May 16, 1999 (age 26); London, England
- Occupation: Actor
- Years active: 2014–present

Jayden Revri (born May 16, 1999) is an actor known for Dead Boy Detectives (2024), The Lodge (2016), Fate: The Winx Saga (2021) and Innocent (2018).

== Early life ==
Revri was born in London, England. He attended Stagecoach Performing Art School after being scouted by an agency at his Year 6 production of The Lion King.

== Career ==
His breakout role was as Noah Potts in Disney's The Lodge. He played Devin in Fate: The Winx Saga before being cast in his lead role as Charles Rowland in Dead Boy Detectives.

== Filmography ==
=== Series ===
Year	Title	Role	Notes
2016-2017	The Lodge	Noah Potts	25 episodes
2021	Innocent	Hardeep	2 episodes
2021	Fate: The Winx Saga	Devin	3 episodes
2024	Dead Boy Detectives	Charles Rowland	8 episodes

=== Short films ===
Year	Title	Role
2014	Mohammed	Adam
2014	Augustina	Dean
2015	Rushing	Henry
2015	Taciturn	Ethan
