= Yuval Dor =

Israeli singer-songwriter, composer and voice actor

- יובל דור
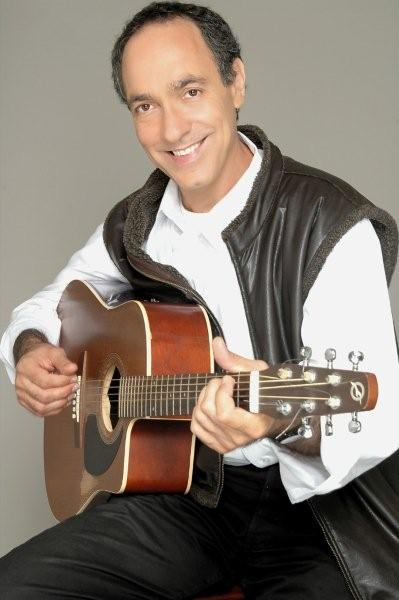
- Born: 10 December 1950 (age 74); Holon, Israel
- Occupations: Singer-songwriter; composer; voice actor
- Years active: 1969–present
- Spouse: Shlomit Aharon (m. 1977; div. 2002)
- Children: 2
- Relatives: Gil Dor (brother)
- Musical career
- Genres: Pop
- Instruments: Vocals; guitar
- Labels: Hed Artzi; Helicon

Yuval Dor (Hebrew: יובל דור; born 10 December 1950) is an Israeli singer-songwriter, composer and voice actor.
