= Shlomit Aharon =

Israeli singer and actress

- שלומית אהרון
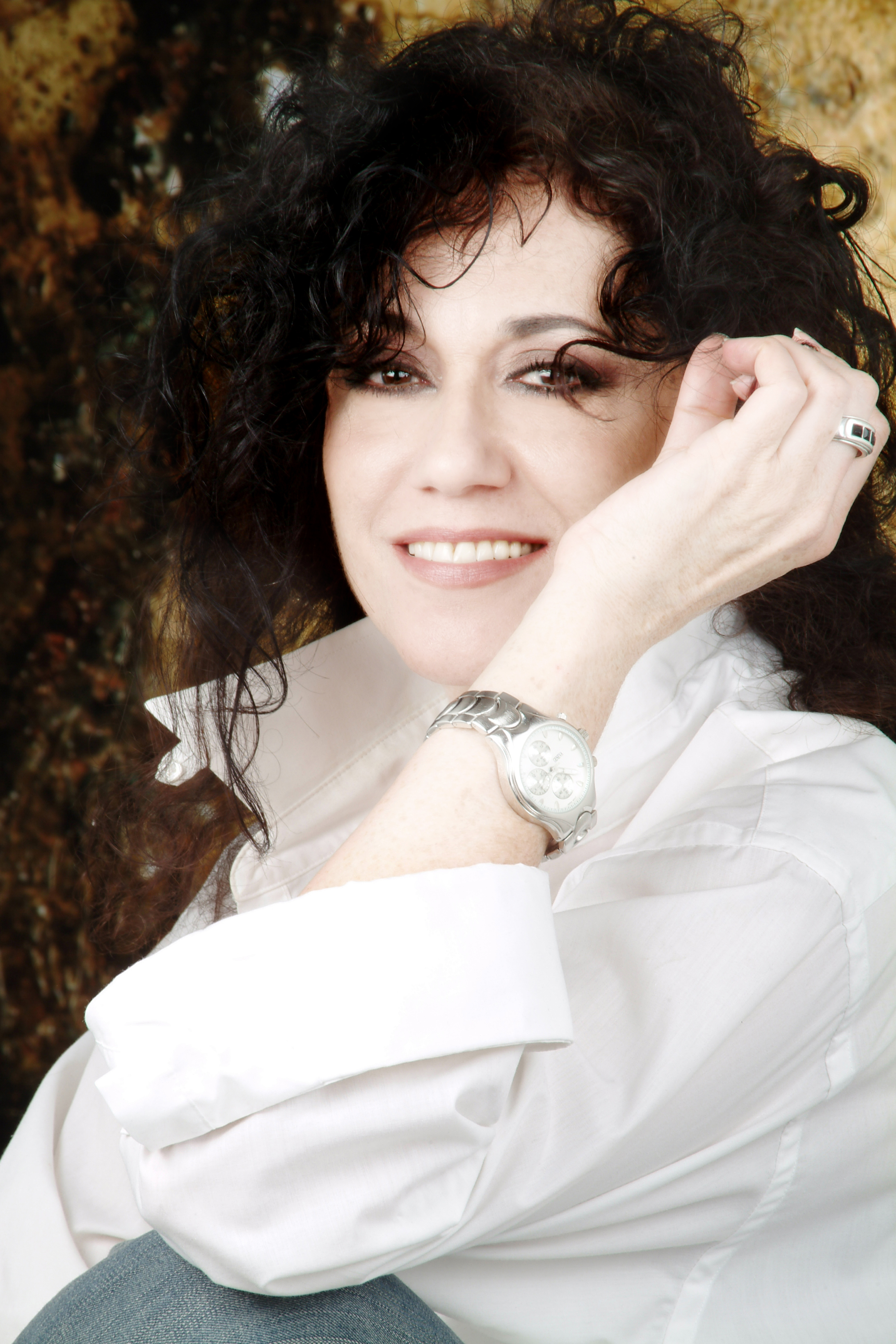
- Born: Shlomit Debinik; 10 July 1950 (age 75); Tel Aviv, Israel
- Other names: Shlomit
- Occupations: Singer; actress
- Years active: 1965–present
- Spouse: Yuval Dor (m. 1977; div. 2002)
- Children: 2
- Awards: AMI's Lifetime Achievement Award
- Musical career
- Genres: Pop
- Instrument: Vocals
- Labels: Hed Artzi; Helicon

Shlomit Aharon (Hebrew: שלומית אהרון; born Shlomit Debinik; Hebrew: שלומית דביניק; 10 July 1950) is an Israeli singer and actress, best known as the lead vocalist of the band Hakol Over Habibi.

== Biography ==
Aharon was born in Tel Aviv as Shlomit Debinik to a couple of Polish-Jewish parents. Her father, Aharon, was a Holocaust survivor. Her mother, Naomi (1923–2016), was a singer and actress in the Yiddish theater in Łódź.

From a young age, Aharon's musical talent stood out. She studied at the Rananim School of Arts in Tel Aviv, together with Shlomo Bar-Aba, Dov Glickman, and Yigal Bashan, with whom she appeared in the duo "Yigal and Shlomit" from the age of 15. At the age of 16, the two had a joint hit on the radio called "The Golden Age", and they also recorded the song "Year of the Thousand", but they did not get to record a complete album for it.

When she was 17 years old, her father Aharon died, and in his memory, Shlomit changed her last name to his name.

Aharon continued her professional career in the Central Command Band, where she performed lead vocals on the songs "I Have A Lover In the Commando Unit" and "Better Days" as part of their eighteenth program "Near the Jordan" which released in 1970. Upon her release from the army, Aharon participated in the show "The Tailor and the Shoemaker's Wife". In 1971, she participated in the soundtrack of the Israeli comedy film The Contract.

On 1981, "Hakol Over Habibi" won at Israel's national Kdam Eurovision. The song, "Halayla", performed by Hakol Over Habibi and composed by Shuki Levy, with lyrics written by Shlomit Aharon and Yuval Dor, was presented in the Eurovision Song Contest of 1981 and won 7th place. Aharon went on stage when she was in late stage of pregnancy.

Aharon provided the voice of Ariel in the Hebrew dub of the 1989 film The Little Mermaid.

== Discography ==
- 1989: My man and my lover
- 1992: Hebrew record
- 1998: Ladies & Gentlemen
- 2000: Love More
- 2003: Duet
- 2006: When you will come, you will see
- 2007: The joint show with Hakol Over Habibi
- 2010: Shlomit Aharon and the three tenors
- 2015: Real quiet

== Awards ==
- 2021: AMI's Lifetime Achievement Award
