= A Máscara =

Portuguese singing competition television show

- Genre: Reality competition
- Based on: King of Mask Singer by Munhwa Broadcasting Corporation
- Presented by: João Manzarra
- Starring: César Mourão; Jorge Corrula; Aurea; Carolina Loureiro
- Country of origin: Portugal
- Original language: Portuguese
- No. of seasons: 5
- No. of episodes: 53 (+1 special)

Original release
- Network: SIC
- Release: 1 January 2020 – present

A Máscara is a Portuguese reality singing competition television series based on the Masked Singer franchise which originated from the South Korean version of the show King of Mask Singer. It premiered on SIC on 1 January 2020.

== Series overview ==
Series	Celebrities	Episodes	Originally released		Winner	Runner-up	Third place
Series	Celebrities	Episodes	First released	Last released	Winner	Runner-up	Third place
1	12	9	1 January 2020	23 February 2020	Rita Guerra as "Corvo"	Padre Borga as "Astronauta"	Raquel Tavares as "Pavão"
2	13	11	1 January 2021	7 March 2021	Pedro Granger as "Lobo"	António Camelier as "Coelho"	Nuno Guerreiro as "Coruja"
3	12	9	18 December 2021	19 February 2022	Ivo Lucas as "Viking"	Sérgio Rosado as "Cato"	Miguel Cristovinho & Kasha as "Cisnes"
4	12	9	1 January 2024	24 March 2024	Fátima Lopes as "Castor"	Ricardo Pereira as "Brócolo"	João Jesus as "Urso Polar"
5	18	15	1 January 2025	2 March 2025	Micaela as "Maçaroca"	Júlia Palha as "Rato"	Bruno de Carvalho as "Elefante"

== Season 1 ==
=== Contestants ===
The first season premiered on 1 January 2020 and ended on 23 February of the same year.

Results
Stage name	Celebrity	Occupation	Episodes												
Stage name	Celebrity	Occupation	1	2	3	4	5	6		7		8		9	
Stage name	Celebrity	Occupation	1	2	3	4	5	A	B	A	B	A	B	A	B
Corvo	Rita Guerra	Singer	WIN		WIN	WIN	WIN	RISK	WIN	WIN		WIN	WIN	WIN	WINNER
Astronauta	Padre Borga	Priest		WIN	RISK	WIN	RISK	RISK	WIN	WIN		WIN	WIN	RISK	RUNNER-UP
Pavão	Raquel Tavares	Singer		RISK	WIN	WIN	RISK	WIN		RISK	WIN	WIN	RISK	THIRD	
Borboleta	Mariana Pacheco	Singer	RISK		RISK	WIN	WIN	RISK	WIN	RISK	WIN	WIN	OUT		
Cavaleiro	Windoh	YouTuber		RISK	WIN	RISK	WIN	RISK	RISK	RISK	RISK	OUT			
Pantera	Sara Carreira	Singer		WIN	RISK	WIN	RISK	RISK	RISK	RISK	OUT				
Leão	João Paulo Rodrigues	Actor		WIN	WIN	WIN	WIN	RISK	OUT						
Monstro	Maria João Abreu	Actress	WIN		RISK	RISK	OUT								
Poodle	Francisco Menezes	Actor	WIN		WIN	OUT									
Ananás	Rogério Samora	Actor	RISK		OUT										
Pérola	Diana Pereira	Model		OUT											
Cavalo	Jel	Humorist	OUT												

== Episodes ==
=== Episode 1 (1 January) ===
Performances on the first episode
#	Stage name	Song	Result	
1	Borboleta	"Bang Bang" by Jessie J, Ariana Grande, & Nicki Minaj	RISK	
2	Monstro	"Material Girl" by Madonna	WIN	
3	Ananás	"Amor D'Água Fresca" by Dina	RISK	
4	Corvo	"Sweet Dreams (Are Made of This)" by Marilyn Manson	WIN	
5	Poodle	"Crazy in Love" by Beyoncé feat. Jay-Z	WIN	
6	Cavalo	"O Corpo é Que Paga" by António Variações	RISK	
Sing-off details			Identity	Result
1	Borboleta	"The Show Must Go On" by Queen	undisclosed	SAFE
2	Ananás	"Bella Ciao" by Goran Bregović	undisclosed	SAFE
3	Cavalo	"Hound Dog" by Elvis Presley	Jel	OUT

=== Episode 2 (5 January) ===
Performances on the second episode
#	Stage name	Song	Result	
1	Pavão	"Re-Tratamento" by Da Weasel	RISK	
2	Astronauta	"O Sol" by Vitor Kley	WIN	
3	Pantera	"Show das Poderosas" by Anitta	WIN	
4	Pérola	"Diamonds" by Rihanna	RISK	
5	Cavaleiro	"I Need This Girl" by Virgul	RISK	
6	Leão	"Set Fire to the Rain" by Adele	WIN	
Sing-off details			Identity	Result
1	Pavão	"Sonhos de Menino" by Tony Carreira	undisclosed	SAFE
2	Pérola	"O Amor É Mágico" by Expensive Soul	Diana Pereira	OUT
3	Cavaleiro	"Hotline Bling" by Drake	undisclosed	SAFE

=== Episode 3 (11 & 12 January) ===
Performances on the third episode
#	Stage name	Song	Result	
1	Monstro	"Shake it Off" by Taylor Swift	RISK	
2	Pavão	"Back to Black" by Amy Winehouse	WIN	
3	Astronauta	"Naptel Xulima" by HMB	RISK	
4	Cavaleiro	"Starboy" by The Weeknd	WIN	
5	Pantera	"Love on the Brain" by Rihanna	RISK	
6	Poodle	"Treasure" by Bruno Mars	WIN	
7	Ananás	"Garota de Ipanema" by Stan Getz & João Gilberto	RISK	
8	Leão	"Dancing on My Own" by Calum Scott	WIN	
9	Borboleta	"Lady Marmalade" by Labelle	RISK	
10	Corvo	"Não Posso Mais" by Pedro Abrunhosa	WIN	
Sing-off details			Identity	Result
1	Monstro	Saved from Risk	undisclosed	WIN
2	Pantera	Saved from Risk	undisclosed	WIN
3	Astronauta	"Frágil" by Jorge Palma	undisclosed	SAFE
4	Ananás	"Feeling Good" by Nina Simone	Rogério Samora	OUT
5	Borboleta	"Desfolhada portuguesa" by Simone de Oliveira	undisclosed	SAFE

=== Episode 4 (18 & 19 January) ===
Performances on the fourth episode
#	Stage name	Song	Result	
1	Leão	"Shape of You" by Ed Sheeran	WIN	
2	Borboleta	"I Put a Spell on You" by Screamin' Jay Hawkins	WIN	
3	Cavaleiro	"Põe A Mão No Ar" by Mundo Secreto	RISK	
4	Pavão	"Can't Take My Eyes Off You" by Frankie Valli	WIN	
5	Poodle	"Kiss" by Prince	RISK	
6	Corvo	"The Sound of Silence" by Simon & Garfunkel	WIN	
7	Astronauta	"Fácil de Entender" by The Gift	WIN	
8	Pantera	"One Way or Another (Teenage Kicks)" by One Direction	WIN	
9	Monstro	"Always Remember Us This Way" by Lady Gaga	RISK	
Sing-off details			Identity	Result
1	Cavaleiro	"Havana" by Camila Cabello	undisclosed	SAFE
2	Poodle	"Billie Jean" by Michael Jackson	Francisco Menezes	OUT
3	Monstro	"So What" by Pink	undisclosed	SAFE

=== Episode 5 (25 & 26 January) ===
- Guest performance: Camaleão (António Sala) sings "20 Anos" by José Cid

Performances on the fifth episode
#	Stage name	Song	Result	
1	Pantera	"Thank U, Next" by Ariana Grande	RISK	
2	Cavaleiro	"Hip Hop (Sou Eu e és Tu)" by Boss AC	WIN	
3	Borboleta	"(You Make Me Feel Like) A Natural Woman" by Aretha Franklin	WIN	
4	Astronauta	"Estou Além" by António Variações	RISK	
5	Corvo	"Don't Stop 'Til You Get Enough" by Michael Jackson	WIN	
6	Pavão	"Pica Do 7" by António Zambujo	RISK	
7	Leão	"Highway to Hell" by AC/DC	WIN	
8	Monstro	"The Lazy Song" by Bruno Mars	RISK	
Sing-off details			Identity	Result
1	Astronauta	Saved from Risk	undisclosed	WIN
2	Pantera	"Gaivota" by Amália Rodrigues	undisclosed	SAFE
3	Pavão	"La Vie en rose" by Édith Piaf	undisclosed	SAFE
4	Monstro	"Love of My Life" by Queen	Maria João Abreu	OUT

=== Episode 6 (1 & 2 February) ===
- Guest performance: Camaleão (Ágata) sings "Cheguei" by Ludmilla

Performances on the sixth episode
#	Stage name	Song	Identity	Result
Round one
1	Corvo	"Supermassive Black Hole" by Muse	RISK	
2	Leão	"Unstoppable" by Sia	RISK	
3	Pantera	"If I Ain't Got You" by Alicia Keys	RISK	
4	Astronauta	"Bem bom" by Doce	RISK	
5	Borboleta	"Smells Like Teen Spirit" by Nirvana	RISK	
6	Cavaleiro	"Unforgettable" by French Montana	RISK	
7	Pavão	"Felices los 4" by Maluma	WIN	
Round two
1	Corvo	"Moves Like Jagger" by Maroon 5	undisclosed	WIN
2	Leão	"You Say" by Lauren Daigle	João Paulo Rodrigues	OUT
3	Pantera	"New Rules" by Dua Lipa	undisclosed	RISK
4	Astronauta	"Não Me Toca" by Anselmo Ralph	undisclosed	WIN
5	Borboleta	"Problema de Expressão" by Clã	undisclosed	WIN
6	Cavaleiro	"Blurred Lines" by Robin Thicke	undisclosed	RISK

=== Episode 7 (8 & 9 February) ===
- Guest performance: Camaleão (Nelson Évora) sings "I Got You (I Feel Good)" by James Brown

Performances on the seventh episode
#	Stage name	Song	Identity	Result
Round one
1	Pantera	"It's My Life" by Bon Jovi	RISK	
2	Borboleta	"Faz gostoso" by Blaya	RISK	
3	Cavaleiro	"24K Magic" by Bruno Mars	RISK	
4	Pavão	"Respect" by Aretha Franklin	RISK	
5	Astronauta	"Playback" by Carlos Paião	WIN	
6	Corvo	"I Was Made for Lovin' You" by Kiss	WIN	
Round two
1	Pantera	"Single Ladies (Put a Ring on It)" by Beyoncé	Sara Carreira	OUT
2	Borboleta	"It's a Man's Man's Man's World" by James Brown	undisclosed	WIN
3	Cavaleiro	"Do You No Wrong" by Richie Campbell	undisclosed	RISK
4	Pavão	"Big Spender" by Shirley Bassey	undisclosed	WIN

=== Episode 8 (15 & 16 February) ===
- Guest performance: Camaleão (Madjer) sings "Dizer Que Não" by Dengaz

Performances on the eighth episode
#	Stage name	Song	Identity	Result
Round one
1	Astronauta	"Coração Não Tem Idade" by Toy	undisclosed	SAFE
2	Borboleta	"Bring Me to Life" by Evanescence	undisclosed	SAFE
3	Pavão	"The Ketchup Song" by Las Ketchup	undisclosed	SAFE
4	Corvo	"Wuthering Heights" by Kate Bush	undisclosed	SAFE
5	Cavaleiro	"Sorry" by Justin Bieber	Windoh	OUT
Round two
1	Astronauta	"Sexta-Feira (Emprego Bom Já)" by Boss AC	WIN	
2	Borboleta	"Con te partirò" by Andrea Bocelli	RISK	
3	Pavão	"It's Oh So Quiet" by Björk	RISK	
4	Corvo	"Get Lucky" by Daft Punk	WIN	
Sing-off details			Identity	Result
1	Borboleta	"Bang Bang" by Jessie J, Ariana Grande, & Nicki Minaj	Mariana Pacheco	OUT
2	Pavão	"Re-Tratamento" by Da Weasel	undisclosed	SAFE

=== Episode 9 (23 & 24 February) ===
==== Round one ====
Performances on the final episode
#	Stage name	Song	Result	
1	Pavão	"All That Jazz" from Chicago	RISK	
2	Astronauta	"Perdoa" by Os Anjos	RISK	
3	Corvo	"It's Not Unusual" by Tom Jones	WIN	
Sing-off details			Identity	Result
1	Pavão	"Tá Escrito" by Grupo Revelação	Raquel Tavares	THIRD
2	Astronauta	"Loucos" by Matias Damásio	undisclosed	SAFE

==== Round two ====
- Guest performance: Camaleão (Roberta Medina) sings "I Don't Care" by Ed Sheeran and Justin Bieber

#	Stage name	Song
1	Corvo	"Bad Guy" by Billie Eilish
2	Astronauta	"Menina Estás à Janela" by Vitorino

==== Round three ====
#	Stage name	Song	Identity	Result
1	Corvo	"Feel It Still" by Portugal. The Man	Rita Guerra	WINNER
2	Astronauta	"Como o Macaco Gosta de Banana" by José Cid	Padre Borga	RUNNER-UP

== Season 2 ==
=== Contestants ===
Stage name	Celebrity	Occupation	Episodes													
Stage name	Celebrity	Occupation	1	2	3		4	5	6		7		8	9	10	
Stage name	Celebrity	Occupation	1	2	A	B	4	5	A	B	A	B	8	9	A	B
Lobo	Pedro Granger	Actor	WIN		RISK		WIN	RISK	WIN		RISK	WIN	RISK	WIN	RISK	WINNER
Coelho	António Camelier	Model		WIN	RISK		WIN	WIN	RISK	WIN	WIN		WIN	RISK	WIN	RUNNER-UP
Coruja	Nuno Guerreiro	Singer	WIN		WIN		WIN	WIN	RISK	WIN	WIN		WIN	WIN	THIRD	
Unicórnio	April Ivy	Singer	RISK			WIN	RISK	WIN	RISK	RISK	RISK	RISK	WIN	OUT		
Dinossauro	Xana Abreu	Singer			INVITEE		WIN	RISK	RISK	RISK	RISK	WIN	OUT			
Banana	Bruno Cabrerizo	Actor		WIN		RISK	WIN	WIN	RISK	WIN	RISK	OUT				
Gelado	Rui Santos	Journalist		WIN	WIN		WIN	WIN	RISK	OUT						
Árvore	Noémia Costa	Actress		RISK		WIN	RISK	OUT								
Tigre	Monica Sintra	Singer		RISK		RISK	OUT									
Bulldog Francês	Adelaide Ferreira	Singer	WIN			OUT										
Abelha	Filipa Nascimento	Actress	RISK		OUT											
Lagostim	Telma Monteiro	Judoist		OUT												
Robô	Luís Represas	Singer	OUT													

== Episodes ==
=== Episode 1 (1 January) ===
Performances on the first episode
#	Stage name	Song	Result	
1	Coruja	"Skyfall" by Adele	WIN	
2	Unicórnio	"Perfume de Mulher" by Ágata	RISK	
3	Abelha	"Physical" by Dua Lipa	RISK	
4	Lobo	"Bad" by Michael Jackson	WIN	
5	Robot	"A Nossa Vez" by Calema	RISK	
6	Bulldog Francês	"Human" by Rag'n'Bone Man	WIN	
Sing-off details			Identity	Result
1	Unicórnio	"Ouvi Dizer" by Orantos Violeta	undisclosed	SAFE
2	Abelha	"Dangerous Woman" by Ariana Grande	undisclosed	SAFE
3	Robot	Jump Around by Snoop Dog	Luís Represas	OUT

=== Episode 2 (2 January) ===
Performances on the second episode
#	Stage name	Song	Result	
1	Tigre	"Roar" by Katy Perry	RISK	
2	Gelado	"Quente, Quente, Quente" by Doce	WIN	
3	Árvore	"Non, je ne regrette rien" by Édith Piaf	RISK	
4	Banana	"Happy" by Pharrell Williams	WIN	
5	Coelho	"Imagine" by John Lennon	WIN	
6	Lagostim	"Sexy and I Know It" by LMFAO	RISK	
Sing-off details			Identity	Result
1	Tigre	"If I Were a Boy" by Beyoncé	undisclosed	SAFE
2	Árvore	"Amar é Que é Preciso" by Expensive Soul	undisclosed	SAFE
3	Lagostim	"Toxic" by Britney Spears	Telma Monteiro	OUT

=== Episode 3 (3 January) ===
- Guest Performance: Dinossauro sings "O mio babbino caro" from Gianni Schicchi

Performances on the third episode
#	Stage name	Song	Result	
Round one
1	Coelho	"Milla" by Netinho	RISK	
2	Gelado	"Sol da Caparica" by Peste & Sida	WIN	
3	Lobo	"Everything" by Michael Bublé	RISK	
4	Abelha	"All About That Bass" by Meghan Trainor	RISK	
5	Coruja	"Crazy in Love" by Beyoncé feat. Jay-Z	WIN	
Sing-off details			Identity	Result
1	Lobo	"Quero Voltar" by Heloisa Rosa	undisclosed	SAFE
2	Abelha	"my strange addiction" by Billie Eilish	Filipa Nascimento	OUT
3	Coelho	"SexyBack" by Justin Timberlake	undisclosed	SAFE
Round two
1	Banana	"Fly Me to the Moon" by Frank Sinatra	RISK	
2	Tigre	"Échame la Culpa" by Luis Fonsi & Demi Lovato	RISK	
3	Unicórnio	"Menina Solta" by Giulia Be	WIN	
4	Árvore	"Umbrella" by Rihanna feat. Jay-Z	WIN	
5	Bulldog Francês	"Left Outside Alone" by Anastacia	RISK	
Sing-off details			Identity	Result
1	Tigre	"Cheap Thrills" by Sia	undisclosed	SAFE
2	Banana	"La Banana" by Salsaloco De Cuba	undisclosed	SAFE
3	Bulldog Francês	"Wake Me Up" by Avicii	Adelaide Ferreira	OUT

=== Episode 4 (9 & 10 January) ===
- Guest performance: Camaleão (Cuca Roseta) sings "Can't Help Falling in Love" by Elvis Presley

Performances on the fourth episode
#	Stage name	Song	Result	
1	Coruja	"Sex on Fire" by Kings of Leon	WIN	
2	Unicórnio	"O Ritmo do Amor" by Emanuel	RISK	
3	Dinossauro	"Life on Mars?" by David Bowie	WIN	
4	Banana	"Mambo No. 5" by Lou Bega	WIN	
5	Tigre	"Tainted Love" by Soft Cell	RISK	
6	Gelado	"Mi Gente" by J Balvin & Willy William	WIN	
7	Coelho	"És Tão Sensual" by Toy	WIN	
8	Árvore	"New York, New York" by Frank Sinatra	RISK	
9	Lobo	"Can't Stop the Feeling!" by Justin Timberlake	WIN	
Sing-off details			Identity	Result
1	Unicórnio	"Primavera" by The Gift	undisclosed	SAFE
2	Tigre	"Dance Monkey" by Tones and I	Monica Sintra	OUT
3	Árvore	"Makeup" by Agir	undisclosed	SAFE

=== Episode 5 (16 & 17 January) ===
- Guest performance: Camaleão (Emanuel) sings "My Way" by Frank Sinatra

Performances on the fifth episode
#	Stage name	Song	Result	
1	Banana	"Sua Cara" by Major Lazer	WIN	
2	Lobo	"Wannabe" by Spice Girls	RISK	
3	Gelado	"Eu Gosto É Do Verão" by A Fúria do Açúcar	WIN	
4	Árvore	"One Moment in Time" by Whitney Houston	RISK	
5	Dinossauro	"Breaking the Habit" by Linkin Park	RISK	
6	Coruja	"One Kiss" by Calvin Harris & Dua Lipa	WIN	
7	Unicórnio	"I Wanna Dance with Somebody (Who Loves Me)" by Whitney Houston	RISK	
8	Coelho	"O Amor É o Segredo" by Vitor Kley	WIN	
Sing-off details			Identity	Result
1	Unicórnio	Saved from Risk	undisclosed	WIN
2	Lobo	"Footloose" by Kenny Loggins	undisclosed	SAFE
3	Árvore	"Someone Like You" by Adele	Noémia Costa	OUT
4	Dinossauro	"Man! I Feel Like a Woman!" by Shania Twain	undisclosed	SAFE

=== Episode 6 (30 & 31 January) ===
- Guest performance: Camaleão (Vitor Kley) sings "I'm a Believer" by Smash Mouth

Performances on the sixth episode
#	Stage name	Song	Result	
Round one
1	Banana	"I'm Too Sexy" by Right Said Fred	RISK	
2	Lobo	"Sozinha" by Ágata	WIN	
3	Gelado	"Ai Se Ele Cai" by Xutos & Pontapés	RISK	
4	Coelho	"Blinding Lights" by The Weeknd	RISK	
5	Unicórnio	"Rosa Sangue" by Amor Electro	RISK	
6	Coruja	"American Woman" by Lenny Kravitz	RISK	
7	Dinossauro	"I Started a Joke" by Faith No More	RISK	
Round two
1	Banana	"Sugar" by Robin Schulz	WIN	
2	Gelado	"Ai Se Eu Te Pego" by Os Meninos de Seu Zeh	RISK	
3	Coelho	"Oh, Pretty Woman" by Roy Orbison	WIN	
4	Unicórnio	"Ain't No Other Man" by Christina Aguilera	RISK	
5	Coruja	"Private Dancer" by Tina Turner	WIN	
6	Dinossauro	"Grace Kelly" by Mika	RISK	
Sing-off details			Identity	Result
1	Gelado	"Livin' la Vida Loca" by Ricky Martin	Rui Santos	OUT
2	Unicórnio	"Quem Me Dera" by Mariza	undisclosed	SAFE
3	Dinossauro	"I Love Rock 'n' Roll" by Joan Jett & the Blackhearts	undisclosed	SAFE

=== Episode 7 (6 & 7 February) ===
- Guest performance: Camaleão (Cláudia Vieira) sings "Trevo" by Anavitória

Performances on the seventh episode
#	Stage name	Song	Result	
Round one
1	Coelho	"Let Me Love You" by Mario	WIN	
2	Dinossauro	"Jolene" by Dolly Parton	RISK	
3	Unicórnio	"Only Girl (In the World)" by Rihanna	RISK	
4	Banana	"Burguesinha" by Seu Jorge	RISK	
5	Lobo	"Torero" by Chayanne	RISK	
6	Coruja	"Best Part" by Daniel Caesar & H.E.R.	WIN	
Round two
1	Dinossauro	"Hey Baby" by DJ Ötzi	WIN	
2	Unicórnio	"Ouvi Dizer" by Melim	RISK	
3	Banana	"Loco Contigo" by DJ Snake, J Balvin, & Tyga	RISK	
4	Lobo	"Shut Up and Dance" by Walk the Moon	WIN	
Sing-off details			Identity	Result
1	Unicórnio	"Ninguém, Ninguém" by Marco Paulo	undisclosed	SAFE
3	Banana	"Everybody (Backstreet's Back)" by Backstreet Boys	Bruno Cabrerizo	OUT

=== Episode 8 (14 February) ===
Performances on the eighth episode
#	Stage name	Song	Results	
1	Dinossauro	"Let It Be" by The Beatles	RISK	
2	Lobo	"Rainha Da Noite" by D'Arrasar	RISK	
3	Unicórnio	"How Do You Sleep?" by Sam Smith	WIN	
4	Coelho	"Mysterious Girl" by Peter Andre	WIN	
5	Coruja	"A Woman's Worth" by Alicia Keys	WIN	
Sing-off details			Identity	Result
1	Dinossauro	"There Must Be an Angel" by Eurythmics	Xana Abreu	OUT
3	Lobo	"Conquistador" by Da Vinci	undisclosed	SAFE

=== Episode 9 (21 February) ===
Performances on the ninth episode
#	Stage name	Song	Result	
1	Lobo	"Like a Prayer" by Madonna	WIN	
2	Unicórnio	"Somewhere Over the Rainbow" by Judy Garland	RISK	
3	Coelho	"Watermelon Sugar" by Harry Styles	RISK	
4	Coruja	"Rock Your Body" by Justin Timberlake	WIN	
Sing-off details			Identity	Result
1	Unicórnio	"O Amor É Assim" by HMB	April Ivy	OUT
2	Coelho	"Closer" by Ne-Yo	undisclosed	SAFE

=== Episode 10 (28 February & 7 March) ===
==== Round one ====
Performances on the final episode
#	Stage name	Song
1	Lobo & Padre Borga	"Menina Estás À Janela" by Vitorino
2	Coruja & Mariana Pacheco	"The Show Must Go On" by Queen
3	Coelho & Luís Represas	"Da Próxima Vez" by Luís Represas

==== Round two ====
#	Stage name	Song	Identity	Result
1	Lobo	"Whenever, Wherever" by Shakira	RISK	
2	Coruja	"Here I Go Again" by Whitesnake	RISK	
3	Coelho	"Come as You Are" by Nirvana	WIN	
Sing-off details			Identity	Result
1	Lobo	"Ain't No Mountain High Enough" by Marvin Gaye & Tammi Terrell	undisclosed	SAFE
2	Coruja	"New Light" by John Mayer	Nuno Guerreiro	THIRD

==== Round three ====
#	Stage name	Song
1	Lobo	"I Am What I Am" by Gloria Gaynor
2	Coelho	"Right Here Waiting" by Richard Marx

==== Round four ====
#	Stage name	Song	Identity	Result
1	Lobo	"Eu Sei, Tu És..." by Santamaria	Pedro Granger	WINNER
2	Coelho	"Anna Júlia" by Los Hermanos	António Camelier	RUNNER-UP

== Season 3 ==
=== Contestants ===
Stage name	Celebrity	Occupation	Episodes										
Stage name	Celebrity	Occupation	1	2	3	4	5	6		7	8	9	
Stage name	Celebrity	Occupation	1	2	3	4	5	A	B	7	8	A	B
Viking	Ivo Lucas	Actor	WIN		RISK	RISK	WIN	WIN	WIN	WIN	WIN	WIN	WINNER
Cato	Sérgio Rosado	Singer		RISK	WIN	WIN	RISK	WIN	WIN	WIN	WIN	RISK	RUNNER-UP
Cisnes	Miguel Cristovinho	Singer	WIN		RISK	WIN	WIN	WIN	RISK	WIN	RISK	THIRDS	
Cisnes	Kasha	Singer	WIN		RISK	WIN	WIN	WIN	RISK	WIN	RISK	THIRDS	
Esqueleto	Renato Godinho	Actor		WIN	WIN	RISK	WIN	WIN	RISK	WIN	OUT		
Galo	Fernando Rocha	Comedian		RISK	WIN	WIN	RISK	WIN	WIN	OUT			
Dragão	Fernando Pereira	Singer	RISK		RISK	WIN	RISK	WIN	OUT				
Polvo	Soraia Tavares	Singer	WIN		RISK	WIN	WIN	OUT					
Rainha de Copas	Luana Piovani	Actress		WIN	WIN	WIN	OUT						
Gafanhato	Carolina Patrocínio	TV Presenter		WIN	WIN	OUT							
Orangotango	Tino de Rans	Paver	RISK		OUT								
Cachorro-Quente	Jorge Fonseca	Judoka		OUT									
Gata	Bárbara Guimarães	Presenter	OUT										

== Episodes ==
=== Episode 1 & 2 (18 & 19 December) ===
- Guest performance: Camaleão (Luciana Abreu) sings "Bohemian Rhapsody" by Queen

Performances on the first episode
#	Stage name	Song	Result	
1	Cisnes	"É Melhor Não Duvidar" by C4 Pedro ft. Big Nelo	WIN	
2	Orangotango	"Eres Peligrosa" by Sergio Rossi	RISK	
3	Polvo	"Ave Maria" by Franz Schubert	WIN	
4	Gata	"Ok, Ko" by Doce	RISK	
5	Dragão	"Believer" by Imagine Dragons	RISK	
6	Viking	"Você Partiu Meu Coração" by Nego do Borel ft. Anitta & Wesley Safadão	WIN	
Sing-off details			Identity	Result
1	Orangotango	"O Burrito" by Fernando Correia Marques	undisclosed	SAFE
2	Gata	"Waka Waka" by Shakira ft. Freshlyground	Bárbara Guimarães	OUT
3	Dragão	"Writing's on the Wall" by Sam Smith	undisclosed	SAFE

- Guest performance: Camaleão (Carlos Ribeiro) sings "Baile de Verão" by José Malhoa
- Guest performance: Popota (Sofia Arruda) sings "Hot n Cold" by Katy Perry

Performances on the second episode
#	Stage name	Song	Result	
1	Esqueleto	"Thriller" by Michael Jackson	WIN	
2	Cato	"I'm Outta Love" by Anastacia	RISK	
3	Cachorro-Quente	"Festa" by David Carreira ft. Kevinho	RISK	
4	Gafanhoto	"It's Raining Men" by The Weather Girls	WIN	
5	Galo	"À Minha Maneira" by Xutos & Pontapés	RISK	
6	Rainha de Copas	"Back to Black" by Amy Winehouse	WIN	
Sing-off details			Identity	Result
1	Cato	"Hey Ya!" by Outkast	undisclosed	SAFE
2	Cachorro-Quente	"Contentores" by Xutos & Pontapés	Jorge Fonseca	OUT
3	Galo	"You Shook Me All Night Long" by AC/DC	undisclosed	SAFE

=== Episode 3 (24 & 25 December) ===
- Guest performance: Camaleão (Romana) sings "Rise Up" by Andra Day

Performances on the third episode
#	Stage name	Song	Result	
1	Viking	"Think of Me" from The Phantom of the Opera	RISK	
2	Gafanhoto	"Baba" by Kelly Key	WIN	
3	Cato	"Whataya Want from Me" by Adam Lambert	WIN	
4	Polvo	"Falésia Do Amor" by Santamaria	RISK	
5	Rainha de Copas	"Alejandro" by Lady Gaga	WIN	
6	Dragão	"Skin" by Rag'n'Bone Man	RISK	
7	Orangotango	"Coração de Melão" by Melão	RISK	
8	Galo	"Roadhouse Blues" by The Doors	WIN	
9	Esqueleto	"O corpo é que paga" by António Variações	WIN	
10	Cisnes	"Felices los 4" by Maluma	RISK	
Sing-off details			Identity	Result
1	Polvo	undisclosed		WIN
2	Dragão	undisclosed		WIN
3	Viking	"Bem-Disposto" by Rony Fuego	undisclosed	SAFE
4	Orangotango	"Mestre de Culinária" by Quim Barreiros	Tino de Rans	OUT
5	Cisnes	"Rockstar" by Post Malone ft. 21 Savage	undisclosed	SAFE
5	Cisnes	"Rockstar" by Post Malone ft. 21 Savage	undisclosed	SAFE

=== Episode 4 (26 December) ===
- Guest performance: Camaleão (Carlos Alberto Vidal) sings "Yesterday" by The Beatles

Performances on the fourth episode
#	Stage name	Song	Result	
1	Cisnes	"La Tortura" by Shakira ft. Alejandro Sanz	WIN	
2	Rainha de Copas	"Believe" by Cher	WIN	
3	Viking	"Na Sola da Bota" by Rionegro & Solimões	RISK	
4	Gafanhoto	"Paparazzi" by Lady Gaga	RISK	
5	Cato	"Superstition" by Stevie Wonder	WIN	
6	Polvo	"Adorinhas" by Ana Moura	WIN	
7	Esqueleto	"Stayin' Alive" by Bee Gees	RISK	
8	Galo	"Beggin'" by Måneskin	WIN	
9	Dragão	"Take Me to Church" by Hozier	WIN	
Sing-off details			Identity	Result
1	Viking	"Jajāo" by Yudilmy	undisclosed	SAFE
2	Gafanhoto	"Oops!... I Did It Again" by Britney Spears	Carolina Patrocínio	OUT
3	Esqueleto	"Shallow" by Lady Gaga & Bradley Cooper	undisclosed	SAFE

=== Episode 5 (1 & 2 January) ===
- Guest performance: Camaleão (Rebeca) sings "O Pastor" by Madredeus

Performances on the fifth episode
#	Stage name	Song	Result	
1	Cisnes	"É Isso Aí" by Ana Carolina & Seu Jorge	WIN	
2	Rainha de Copas	"I Kissed a Girl" by Katy Perry	RISK	
3	Esqueleto	"Não Me Leves a Mal" by HMB	WIN	
4	Cato	"Rolling in the Deep" by Adele	RISK	
5	Viking	"Terremoto" by Anitta & Kevinho	WIN	
6	Dragão	"Grenade" by Bruno Mars	RISK	
7	Galo	"Highway to Hell" by AC/DC	RISK	
8	Polvo	"God Is a Woman" by Ariana Grande	WIN	
Sing-off details			Identity	Result
1	Galo	undisclosed		WIN
2	Rainha de Copas	"Freedom! '90" by George Michael	Luana Piovani	OUT
3	Cato	"Cryin'" by Aerosmith	undisclosed	SAFE
4	Dragão	"Just Like Fire" by Pink	undisclosed	SAFE

=== Episode 6 (8 & 15 January) ===
Performances on the sixth episode
#	Stage name	Song	Identity	Result
Round one
1	Cato	"Impossible" by James Arthur	undisclosed	WIN
2	Esqueleto	"Dialectos de Ternura" by Da Weasel	undisclosed	WIN
3	Dragão	"Fix You" by Coldplay	undisclosed	WIN
4	Galo	"Born to Be Wild" by Steppenwolf	undisclosed	WIN
5	Cisnes	"Uma Folga À Empregada" by José Malhoa	undisclosed	WIN
5	Cisnes	"Uma Folga À Empregada" by José Malhoa	undisclosed	WIN
6	Polvo	"Malamente" by Rosalía	Soraia Tavares	OUT
7	Viking	"My Heart Will Go On" by Celine Dion	undisclosed	WIN
#	Stage name	Song	Result	
Round two
1	Cato	"Livin' on a Prayer" by Bon Jovi	WIN	
2	Esqueleto	"Survivor" by Destiny's Child	RISK	
3	Dragão	"Con te partirò" by Andrea Bocelli	RISK	
4	Galo	"Are You Gonna Go My Way" by Lenny Kravitz	WIN	
5	Cisnes	"When I Was Your Man" by Bruno Mars	RISK	
6	Viking	"Dynamite" by BTS	WIN	
Sing-off details			Identity	Result
1	Esqueleto	"Do I Wanna Know?" by Arctic Monkeys	undisclosed	SAFE
2	Dragão	"Feel" by Robbie Williams	Fernando Pereira	OUT
3	Cisnes	"Estupidamente Apaixonado" by Toy	undisclosed	SAFE
3	Cisnes	"Estupidamente Apaixonado" by Toy	undisclosed	SAFE

=== Episode 7 (22 January) ===
Performances on the seventh episode
#	Stage name	Song	Identity	Result
1	Esqueleto	"(I've Had) The Time of My Life" by Bill Medley & Jennifer Warnes	undisclosed	WIN
2	Viking	"Yolanda" by Irmãos Verdades	undisclosed	WIN
3	Cisnes	"Para no verte más" by La Mosca Tsé - Tsé	undisclosed	WIN
3	Cisnes	"Para no verte más" by La Mosca Tsé - Tsé	undisclosed	WIN
4	Galo	"Born in the U.S.A." by Bruce Springsteen	Fernando Rocha	OUT
5	Cato	"In My Blood" by Shawn Mendes	undisclosed	WIN

=== Episode 8 (5 February) ===
Performances on the eighth episode
#	Stage name	Song	Result	
1	Esqueleto	"Rainha da Noite" by D'Arrasar	RISK	
2	Viking	"Nessun Dorma" by Giacomo Puccini	WIN	
3	Cisnes	"Perdóname" by Pablo Alborán	RISK	
4	Cato	"Échame la Culpa" by Luis Fonsi & Demi Lovato	WIN	
Sing-off details			Identity	Result
1	Esqueleto	"Thriller" by Michael Jackson	Renato Godinho	OUT
2	Cisnes	"É Melhor Não Duvidar" by C4 Pedro ft. Big Nelo	undisclosed	SAFE
2	Cisnes	"É Melhor Não Duvidar" by C4 Pedro ft. Big Nelo	undisclosed	SAFE

=== Episode 9 (12 & 19 February) ===
==== Round one ====
- Group performance: "On the Floor" by Jennifer Lopez ft. Pitbull

Performances on the final episode
#	Stage name	Song	Result	
1	Cato	"Hello" by Adele	RISK	
2	Cisnes	"Mambo No. 5 (A Little Bit of...)" by Lou Bega	RISK	
3	Viking	"Pode Tentar" by Maninho	WIN	
Sing-off details			Identity	Result
1	Cato	"Cry Me a River" by Justin Timberlake	undisclosed	SAFE
2	Cisnes	"Gosto de Ti" by David Carreira ft. Sara Carreira	Miguel Cristovinho	THIRDS
2	Cisnes	"Gosto de Ti" by David Carreira ft. Sara Carreira	Kasha	THIRDS

==== Round two ====
#	Stage name	Song
1	Viking	"Sorry Seems to Be the Hardest Word" by Elton John
2	Cato	"A Vida Faz-Me Bem" by Os Anjos

==== Round three ====
#	Stage name	Song	Identity	Result
1	Viking	"My Heart Will Go On" by Celine Dion	Ivo Lucas	WINNER
2	Cato	"Rolling in the Deep" by Adele	Sérgio Rosado	RUNNER-UP

== Season 4 ==
=== Contestants ===
The fourth season premiered on 1 January 2024 and ended on 24 March of the same year. It consisted of 12 main contestants and guest contestants appearing in Camaleão once every episode (apart from episode 6, where a double elimination occurred) and in Stápel, when a bonus guest appeared in Episode 8.

Results
Stage name	Celebrity	Occupation	Episodes												
Stage name	Celebrity	Occupation	1	2	3	4	5	6		7		8		9	
Stage name	Celebrity	Occupation	1	2	3	4	5	A	B	A	B	A	B	A	B
Castor	Fátima Lopes	TV presenter		RISK	RISK	WIN	WIN	RISK	WIN	WIN	RISK	WIN	WIN	WIN	WINNER
Brócolo	Ricardo Pereira	Former Soccer Player	RISK		WIN	WIN	WIN	WIN	RISK	WIN	WIN	WIN	WIN	RISK	RUNNER-UP
Urso Polar	João Jesus	Actor	WIN		RISK	WIN	RISK	WIN	RISK	WIN	WIN	RISK		THIRD	
Carrossel	Ana Bacalhau	Singer	WIN		WIN	WIN	RISK	WIN	WIN	WIN	RISK	WIN	OUT		
Bola de Espelhos	Bárbara Branco	Actress		WIN	RISK	WIN	WIN	WIN	WIN	RISK	OUT				
Burro	Carla Andrino	Actress		WIN	WIN	WIN	WIN	WIN	OUT						
Caracol	Eduardo Madeira	Actor		WIN	WIN	RISK	RISK	OUT							
Flamingo	Marco Horácio	TV presenter		RISK	RISK	RISK	OUT								
Camelo	Eva Stuart	Singer	WIN		WIN	OUT									
Camelo	Wanda Stuart	Singer	WIN		WIN	OUT									
Serpente	Pedro Tatanka	Singer	RISK		OUT										
Telemóvel	Isabela Valadeiro	Actress		OUT											
Cavalo Marinho	Conceição Lino	Journalist	OUT												

== Episodes ==
=== Episode 1 (1 January) ===
- Special performance: Aurea sings "Diamonds" by Rihanna
- Guest performance: Camaleão (Toy) sings "You Are So Beautiful" by Joe Cocker

Performances on the first episode
#	Stage name	Song	Result	
1	Brócolo	"Amor D'Água Fresca" by Dina	RISK	
2	Camelo	"Frozen" by Madonna	WIN	
3	Carrossel	"...Baby One More Time" by Britney Spears	WIN	
4	Serpente	"Can't Feel My Face" by The Weeknd	RISK	
5	Urso Polar	"Baile de Verão" by José Malhoa	WIN	
6	Cavalo Marinho	"Young and Beautiful" by Lana Del Rey	RISK	
Sing-off details			Identity	Result
1	Brócolo	"Vou Alugar um Quarto" by Jorge Guerreiro	undisclosed	SAFE
2	Serpente	"Unholy" by Sam Smith and Kim Petras	undisclosed	SAFE
3	Cavalo Marinho	"Flowers" by Miley Cyrus	Conceição Lino	OUT

=== Episode 2 (6 January) ===
- Guest performance: Camaleão (Saúl Ricardo) sings "Te Amo" by Calema

Performances on the second episode
#	Stage name	Song	Result	
1	Castor	"Cheguei" by Ludmilla	RISK	
2	Bola de Espelhos	"Man! I Feel Like a Woman!" by Shania Twain	WIN	
3	Burro	"Na Sola da Bota" by Rionegro & Solimões	WIN	
4	Telemóvel	"Azar na Praia" by Nel Monteiro	RISK	
5	Caracol	"Dialectos de Ternura" by Da Weasel	WIN	
6	Flamingo	"Oops!... I Did It Again" by Britney Spears	RISK	
Sing-off details			Identity	Result
1	Castor	"Mamma Mia" by ABBA	undisclosed	SAFE
2	Telemóvel	"Busy for Me" by Aurea	Isabela Valadeiro	OUT
3	Flamingo	"It's Oh So Quiet" by Björk	undisclosed	SAFE

=== Episode 3 (13 & 20 January) ===
- Guest performance: Camaleão (Virgílio Castelo) sings "Highway to Hell" by AC/DC

Performances on the third episode
#	Stage name	Song	Result	
1	Flamingo	"Viva la Vida" by Coldplay	RISK	
2	Carrossel	"Hung Up" by Madonna	WIN	
3	Burro	"O Burrito" by Fernando Correia Marques	WIN	
4	Serpente	"The Sound of Silence" by Disturbed	RISK	
5	Brócolo	"Não Me Toca" by Anselmo Ralph	WIN	
6	Urso Polar	"Feeling Good" by Michael Bublé	RISK	
7	Bola de Espelhos	"Comunhão de Bens" by Ágata	RISK	
8	Camelo	"Nothing Else Matters" by Metallica	WIN	
9	Caracol	"És Tão Sensual" by Toy	WIN	
10	Castor	"Havana" by Camila Cabello ft. Young Thug	RISK	
Sing-off details			Identity	Result
1	Flamingo	undisclosed		WIN
2	Bola de Espelhos	undisclosed		WIN
3	Serpente	"Poker Face" by Lady Gaga	Pedro Tatanka	OUT
4	Urso Polar	"Ninguém, Ninguém" by Marco Paulo	undisclosed	SAFE
5	Castor	"Physical" by Dua Lipa	undisclosed	SAFE

=== Episode 4 (2 & 3 February) ===
- Guest performance: Camaleão (Paula Lobo Antunes) sings "Watermelon Sugar" by Harry Styles

Performances on the fourth episode
#	Stage name	Song	Result	
1	Caracol	"Mestre de Culinária" by Quim Barreiros	RISK	
2	Bola de Espelhos	"Womanizer" by Britney Spears	WIN	
3	Burro	"Rapunzel" by Daniela Mercury	WIN	
4	Flamingo	"Shake It Off" by Taylor Swift	RISK	
5	Castor	"Believe" by Cher	WIN	
6	Carrossel	"Barbie Girl" by Aqua	WIN	
7	Brócolo	"Bailando" by Enrique Iglesias feat. Mickael Carreira, Descemer Bueno & Gente de Zona	WIN	
8	Camelo	"Heart of Glass" by Blondie	RISK	
9	Urso Polar	"Milla" by Netinho	WIN	
Sing-off details			Identity	Result
1	Caracol	"A Minha Casinha" by Xutos & Pontapés	undisclosed	SAFE
2	Camelo	"It's Raining Men" by Geri Halliwell	Eva Stuart	OUT
2	Camelo	"It's Raining Men" by Geri Halliwell	Wanda Stuart	OUT
3	Flamingo	"As It Was" by Harry Styles	undisclosed	SAFE

=== Episode 5 (11 & 12 February) ===
- Guest performance: Camaleão (Ricardo Pereira) sings "Hawái" by Maluma

Performances on the fifth episode
#	Stage name	Song	Result	
1	Castor	"Call Me Maybe" by Carly Rae Jepsen	WIN	
2	Urso Polar	"Eu Gosto É Do Verão" by A Fúria do Açúcar	RISK	
3	Brócolo	"...O Corpo é Que Paga" by António Variações	WIN	
4	Carrossel	"Despechá" by Rosalía	RISK	
5	Flamingo	"Can't Stop the Feeling!" by Justin Timberlake	RISK	
6	Burro	"Zumba Na Caneca" by Tonicha	WIN	
7	Caracol	"O Bicho" by Iran Costa	RISK	
8	Bola de Espelhos	"Jolene" by Dolly Parton	WIN	
Sing-off details			Identity	Result
1	Carrossel	undisclosed		WIN
2	Urso Polar	"Ai Se Eu Te Pego" by Michel Teló	undisclosed	SAFE
3	Flamingo	"Bad Habits" by Ed Sheeran	Marco Horácio	OUT
4	Caracol	"Piradinha" by Gabriel Valim	undisclosed	SAFE

=== Episode 6 (17 & 18 February) ===
Performances on the sixth episode
#	Stage name	Song	Identity	Result
Round one
1	Urso Polar	"Paparazzi" by Lady Gaga	undisclosed	WIN
2	Caracol	"Ai Se Ele Cai" by Xutos & Pontapés	Eduardo Madeira	OUT
3	Castor	"Hot n Cold" by Katy Perry	undisclosed	RISK
4	Brócolo	"Comi-lhe o Melão" by Saúl Ricardo	undisclosed	WIN
5	Bola de Espelhos	"Hush Hush; Hush Hush" by The Pussycat Dolls	undisclosed	WIN
6	Burro	"Show das Poderosas" by Anitta	undisclosed	WIN
7	Carrossel	"Save Your Tears" by The Weeknd	undisclosed	WIN
#	Stage name	Song	Result	
Round two
1	Urso Polar	"Party Rock Anthem" by LMFAO ft. Lauren Bennett & Goonrock	RISK	
2	Castor	"Sushi" by Nenny	WIN	
3	Brócolo	"Conquistador" by Da Vinci	RISK	
4	Bola de Espelhos	"Dancing Queen" by ABBA	WIN	
5	Carrossel	"Arerê" by Banda Eva	WIN	
6	Burro	"Tic, Tic Tac" by Carrapicho	RISK	
Sing-off details			Identity	Result
1	Urso Polar	"SexyBack" by Justin Timberlake	undisclosed	SAFE
2	Brócolo	"Vida de Marinheiro" by Sitiados	undisclosed	SAFE
3	Burro	"Sorte Grande" by Ivete Sangalo	Carla Andrino	OUT

=== Episode 7 (25 & 26 February) ===
- Guest performance: Camaleão (Rui Unas) sings "Tu És A Que Eu Quero" by José Pinhal

Performances on the seventh episode
#	Stage name	Song	Identity	Result
Round one
1	Brócolo	"Eu Sei, Tu És..." by Santamaria	undisclosed	WIN
2	Carrossel	"Single Ladies (Put a Ring on It)" by Beyoncé	undisclosed	WIN
3	Castor	"New Rules" by Dua Lipa	undisclosed	WIN
4	Bola de Espelhos	"Good 4 U" by Olivia Rodrigo	undisclosed	RISK
5	Urso Polar	"Loucos" by Matias Damásio ft. Héber Marques	undisclosed	WIN
Round two
1	Brócolo	"Aiué do Roça Roça" by Némanus	undisclosed	WIN
2	Carrossel	"Tik Tok" by Kesha	undisclosed	RISK
3	Castor	"A Moda do Pisca Pisca" by Ruth Marlene	undisclosed	RISK
4	Urso Polar	"Con te partirò" by Andrea Boccelli	undisclosed	WIN
Sing-off details			Identity	Result
1	Castor	"All About That Bass" by Meghan Trainor	undisclosed	SAFE
2	Bola de Espelhos	"Set Fire to the Rain" by Adele	Bárbara Branco	OUT
3	Carrossel	"Playback" by Carlos Paião	undisclosed	SAFE

=== Episode 8 (2 & 10 March) ===
- Guest performance in Round 1: Camaleão (Sónia Tavares) sings "Bad Guy" by Billie Eilish
- Guest performance in Round 2: Stápel (Fernando Daniel) sings "Love Is on My Side" by The Black Mamba

Performances on the eighth episode
#	Stage name	Song	Identity	Result
1	Carrossel	"Candyman" by Christina Aguilera	WIN	
2	Castor	"Y.M.C.A." by Village People	WIN	
3	Urso Polar	"Kalemba (Wegue Wegue)" by Buraka Som Sistema	RISK	
4	Brócolo	"Coração de Melão" by Melão	WIN	
Round two
1	Carrossel	"Wannabe" by Spice Girls	RISK	
2	Castor	"Faz gostoso" by Blaya	WIN	
3	Brócolo	"És Tão Boa" by Herman José	WIN	
Sing-off details			Identity	Result
1	Carrossel	"9 to 5" by Dolly Parton	Ana Bacalhau	OUT
2	Urso Polar	"Stayin' Alive" by Bee Gees	undisclosed	SAFE

=== Episode 9 (18 & 24 March) ===
==== Round one ====
- Group performance: "TBA" by TBA

Performances on the final episode
#	Stage name	Song	Duetpartner	Result
1	Brócolo	"Yolanda" by Irmãos Verdades	Ivo Lucas (Viking)	RISK
2	Castor	"Shut Up and Dance" by Walk the Moon	Pedro Granger (Lobo)	WIN
3	Urso Polar	"Moves Like Jagger" by Maroon 5 ft. Christina Aguilera	Rita Guerra (Corvo)	RISK
Sing-off details			Identity	Result
1	Brócolo	"Juramento Eterno De Sal" by Álvaro de Luna	undisclosed	SAFE
2	Urso Polar	"Thriller" by Michael Jackson	João Jesus	THIRD

==== Round two ====
#	Stage name	Song
1	Castor	"Rainha" by Virgul
2	Brócolo	"O Sol" by Vitor Kley

==== Round three ====
#	Stage name	Song	Identity	Result
1	Castor	"Sushi" by Nenny	Fátima Lopes	WINNER
2	Brócolo	"Amor D'Água Fresca" by Dina	Ricardo Pereira	RUNNER-UP

== Season 5 ==
=== Contestants ===
The fifth season premiered on 1 January 2025 and ended on 2 March of the same year. It consisted of 18 main contestants, which is six more than usual.

Results
Stage name	Celebrity	Occupation	Episodes																
Stage name	Celebrity	Occupation	1	2	3	4	5	6	7	8	9	10	11	12	13	14		15	
Stage name	Celebrity	Occupation	1	2	3	4	5	6	7	8	9	10	11	12	13	A	B	A	B
Maçaroca	Micaela	Singer		WIN		RISK		WIN		WIN	WIN		WIN	RISK	RISK	RISK	RISK	RISK	WINNER
Rato	Júlia Palha	Actress	WIN		WIN			RISK		WIN		WIN	WIN	RISK	WIN	RISK	WIN	WIN	RUNNER-UP
Elefante	Bruno de Carvalho	Sports Commentator	WIN			WIN	WIN			WIN	WIN		RISK	WIN	WIN	WIN		THIRD	
Abacate	Marco Rodrigues	Singer		WIN	RISK		WIN		WIN		RISK		WIN	RISK	RISK	RISK	OUT		
Coala	Gonçalo da Câmara Pereira	Politician	RISK		RISK		RISK			RISK		RISK	WIN	RISK	OUT				
Tubarão	Diogo Martins	Actor		WIN	WIN			WIN	WIN			RISK	RISK	OUT					
Foguetão	MATAY	Singer	WIN		WIN		RISK		RISK		RISK		RISK	OUT					
Relógio	Anabela	Singer		RISK		WIN	WIN		WIN			WIN	OUT						
Crocodilo	João Moleira	Journalist	WIN			WIN		RISK	WIN			OUT							
Boneca	Melão	Singer	WIN			RISK		WIN		WIN	OUT								
Bola de Praia	Kapinha	Musician/Actor		WIN	RISK			WIN		OUT									
Bola de Praia	Mafalda Teixeira	Actress		WIN	RISK			WIN		OUT									
Pata	Rita Ribeiro	Actress	WIN			WIN		RISK	OUT										
Cupcake	Joana Aguiar	Actress		WIN		RISK		OUT											
Máquina de Pastilhas	Ana Galvão	Radio personality	RISK		WIN		OUT												
Rosa	Ana Garcia Martins	Influencer		WIN		OUT													
Gazela	Fátima Lopes	Fashion Designer		RISK	OUT														
Joaninha	Zé Manel	Singer		OUT															
Algodão Doce	José Milhazes	Journalist	OUT																

== Episodes ==
=== Episode 1 (1 January) ===
Performances on the first episode
#	Stage name	Song	Result	
1	Rato	"Perdoa" by Anjos	WIN	
2	Máquina de Pastilhas	"Dance the Night" by Dua Lipa	RISK	
3	Elefante	"Starboy" by The Weeknd ft. Daft Punk	WIN	
4	Pata	"Diamonds Are Forever" by Shirley Bassey	WIN	
5	Algodão Doce	"Este Sabor a Ti" by Tony Carreira	RISK	
6	Foguetão	"Purple Rain" by Prince	WIN	
7	Crocodilo	"Let's Dance" by David Bowie	WIN	
8	Boneca	"Pó de Arroz" by Carlos Paião	WIN	
9	Coala	"Preço Certo" by Pedro Mafama	RISK	
Sing-off details			Identity	Result
1	Máquina de Pastilhas	"Smile" by Lily Allen	undisclosed	SAFE
2	Algodão Doce	"Corazón" by Maluma	José Milhazes	OUT
3	Coala	"Eu quero um beijinho" by Quim Barreiros	undisclosed	SAFE

=== Episode 2 (4 January) ===
Performances on the second episode
#	Stage name	Song	Result	
1	Tubarão	"Sol de Inverno" by Simone de Oliveira	WIN	
2	Rosa	"Tá Turbinada" by Ana Malhoa	WIN	
3	Relógio	"Yesterday" by The Beatles	RISK	
4	Bola de Praia	"Cheguei" by Ludmilla	WIN	
5	Joaninha	"Take Me to Church" by Hozier	RISK	
6	Maçaroca	"Arerê" by Ivete Sangalo	WIN	
7	Gazela	"It's Raining Men" by Geri Halliwell	RISK	
8	Abacate	"Bésame mucho" by João Gilberto	WIN	
9	Cupcake	"Camaro Amarelo" by Munhoz & Mariano	WIN	
Sing-off details			Identity	Result
1	Relógio	"Time to Say Goodbye" by Andrea Bocelli and Sarah Brightman	undisclosed	SAFE
2	Joaninha	"Espresso" by Sabrina Carpenter	Zé Manel	OUT
3	Gazela	"Material Girl" by Madonna	undisclosed	SAFE

=== Episode 3 (5 January) ===
- Guest performance: Camaleão (José Avillez) sings "Creep" by Radiohead

Performances on the third episode
#	Stage name	Song	Result	
1	Foguetão	"A Sky Full of Stars" by Coldplay	WIN	
2	Coala	"Vou Alugar Um Quarto" by Jorge Guerreiro	RISK	
3	Abacate	"Despacito" by Luis Fonsi & Daddy Yankee	RISK	
4	Tubarão	"Flowers" by Miley Cyrus	WIN	
5	Bola de Praia	"Falésia Do Amor" by Santamaria	RISK	
6	Rato	"Don't Stop the Music" by Rihanna	WIN	
7	Gazela	"Hung Up" by Madonna	RISK	
8	Máquina de Pastilhas	"Treasure" by Bruno Mars	WIN	
Sing-off details			Identity	Result
1	Abacate	undisclosed		WIN
2	Coala	"Morango do Nordeste" by Karametade	undisclosed	SAFE
3	Bola de Praia	"Champagne Showers" by LMFAO ft. Natalia Kills	undisclosed	SAFE
4	Gazela	"Believe" by Cher	Fátima Lopes	OUT

=== Episode 4 (11 & 12 January) ===
- Guest performance: Canetão (João Paulo Sousa) sings "Eu Sou Aquele" by Excesso

Performances on the fourth episode
#	Stage name	Song	Result	
1	Relógio	"A Máquina Acordou" by Amor Electro	WIN	
2	Cupcake	"Cake By The Ocean" by DNCE	RISK	
3	Rosa	"Bad Romance" by Lady Gaga	RISK	
4	Pata	"Sex Bomb" by Tom Jones	WIN	
5	Crocodilo	"Wicked Game" by Chris Isaak	WIN	
6	Maçaroca	"O Que é Que a Baiana Tem" by Dorival Caymmi	RISK	
7	Boneca	"Barbie Girl" by Aqua	RISK	
8	Elefante	"Can't Get You Out of My Head" by Kylie Minogue	WIN	
Sing-off details			Identity	Result
1	Maçaroca	undisclosed		WIN
2	Cupcake	"Yeah!" by Usher ft. Lil Jon & Ludacris	undisclosed	SAFE
3	Rosa	"La Vie en rose" by Édith Piaf	Ana Garcia Martins	OUT
4	Boneca	"Last Friday Night (T.G.I.F.)" by Katy Perry	undisclosed	SAFE

=== Episode 5 (18 January) ===
- Guest performance: Camaleão (Fernando Pimenta) sings "Tudo o que eu te dou" by Pedro Abrunhosa

Performances on the fifth episode
#	Stage name	Song	Result	
1	Abacate	"Bella Ciao" by Valdir Anzolin	WIN	
2	Coala	"Vais Partir" by Clemente	RISK	
3	Elefante	"Scream & Shout" by will.i.am & Britney Spears	WIN	
4	Foguetão	"Happy" by Pharrell Williams	RISK	
5	Relógio	"Skyfall" by Adele	WIN	
6	Máquina de Pastilhas	"Murder on the Dancefloor" by Sophie Ellis-Bextor	RISK	
Sing-off details			Identity	Result
1	Foguetão	undisclosed		WIN
2	Coala	"Coração, Coração Sem Dono" by Ruth Marlene	undisclosed	SAFE
3	Máquina de Pastilhas	"Hey Ya!" by Outkast	Ana Galvão	OUT

=== Episode 6 (19 January) ===
Performances on the sixth episode
#	Stage name	Song	Result	
1	Tubarão	"Dragostea Din Tei" by O-Zone	WIN	
2	Cupcake	"Caviar" by Mónica Sintra	RISK	
3	Crocodilo	"Sweet Dreams (Are Made Of This)" by Marilyn Manson	RISK	
4	Bola de Praia	"Bola Rebola" by Anitta, J Balvin and Tropkillaz	WIN	
5	Rato	"Blank Space" by Taylor Swift	RISK	
6	Maçaroca	"Sua Cara" by Major Lazer feat. Anitta & Pabllo Vittar	WIN	
7	Pata	"Rehab" by Amy Winehouse	RISK	
8	Boneca	"Quente, Quente, Quente" by Doce	WIN	
Sing-off details			Identity	Result
1	Crocodilo	undisclosed		WIN
2	Pata	undisclosed		WIN
3	Cupcake	"Party in the U.S.A." by Miley Cyrus	Joana Aguiar	OUT
4	Rato	"Felices los 4" by Maluma	undisclosed	SAFE

=== Episode 7 (25 January) ===
Performances on the seventh episode
#	Stage name	Song	Result	
1	Crocodilo	"(I Can't Get No) Satisfaction" by The Rolling Stones	WIN	
2	Tubarão	"Loucamente" by D.A.M.A. feat. Bandidos do Cante & Buba Espinho	WIN	
3	Foguetão	"I Gotta Feeling" by The Black Eyed Peas	RISK	
4	Relógio	"I'm Alive" by Céline Dion	WIN	
5	Pata	"Wake Me Up Before You Go-Go" by Wham!	RISK	
6	Abacate	"Cucurrucucu paloma" by PEDRO INFANTE	WIN	
Sing-off details			Identity	Result
1	Foguetão	"I Got You (I Feel Good)" by James Brown	undisclosed	SAFE
2	Pata	"Corazón partío" by Alejandro Sanz	Rita Ribeiro	OUT

=== Episode 8 (26 January) ===
- Guest performance: Camaleão (José Malhoa) sings "Sube la Temperatura" by Ana Malhoa

Performances on the eighth episode
#	Stage name	Song	Result	
1	Coala	"O Melhor Dia Para Casar" by Quim Barreiros	RISK	
2	Maçaroca	"O Mundo Vai" by Ivete Sangalo	WIN	
3	Rato	"Oops!... I Did It Again" by Britney Spears	WIN	
4	Bola de Praia	"On the Floor" by Jennifer Lopez ft. Pitbull	RISK	
5	Boneca	"Thank U, Next" by Ariana Grande	WIN	
6	Elefante	"Do You No Wrong" by Richie Campbell	WIN	
Sing-off details			Identity	Result
1	Coala	"O Ritmo Do Amor" by Emanual	undisclosed	SAFE
2	Bola de Praia	"É Melhor Não Duvidar" by C4 Pedro	Kapinha Teixeira	OUT
2	Bola de Praia	"É Melhor Não Duvidar" by C4 Pedro	Mafalda Teixeira	OUT

=== Episode 9 (1 February) ===
Performances on the ninth episode
#	Stage name	Song	Result	
1	Elefante	"Bad Guy" by Billie Eilish	WIN	
2	Maçaroca	"Buleria" by David Disbal	WIN	
3	Foguetão	"Sexual Healing" by Marvin Gaye	RISK	
4	Boneca	"Cinderela" by Carlos Paião	RISK	
5	Abacate	"María" by Ricky Martin	RISK	
Sing-off details			Identity	Result
1	Foguetão	"Let's Stay Together" by Al Green	undisclosed	SAFE
2	Boneca	"Saia Da Carolina" by Carolina Deslandes	Melão	OUT
3	Abacate	"Canción del mariachi" by Antonio Banderas/Los Lobos	undisclosed	SAFE

=== Episode 10 (2 February) ===
Performances on the tenth episode
#	Stage name	Song	Result	
1	Crocodilo	"Human" by Rag'n'Bone Man	RISK	
2	Coala	"Baile de Verão" by José Malhoa	RISK	
3	Tubarão	"La Tortura" by Shakira ft. Alejandro Sanz	RISK	
4	Relógio	"Ne Me Quitte Pas" by Jacques Brel	WIN	
5	Rato	"Where Is the Love?" by Black Eyed Peas	WIN	
Sing-off details			Identity	Result
1	Crocodilo	"Sail" by Awolnation	João Moleira	OUT
2	Coala	"Rainha do Tik Tok" by Miguel Azevedo	undisclosed	SAFE
3	Tubarão	"Like a Virgin" by Madonna	undisclosed	SAFE

=== Episode 11 (8 February) ===
Performances on the eleventh episode
#	Stage name	Song	Result	
1	Relógio	"Onde vais" by Bárbara Bandeira and Carminho	RISK	
2	Rato	"Show das poderosas" by Anitta	WIN	
3	Abacate	"La Cucaracha" by The Mariachis	WIN	
4	Foguetão	"Crazy" by Gnarls Barkley	RISK	
5	Coala	"Beijo De Funaná" by Némanus	WIN	
6	Elefante	"One More Time" by Daft Punk	RISK	
7	Maçaroca	"Mas que nada" by Sérgio Mendes	WIN	
8	Tubarão	"Training Season" by Dua Lipa	RISK	
Sing-off details			Identity	Result
1	Elefante	undisclosed		WIN
2	Relógio	"Dia de Folga" by Ana Moura	Anabela	OUT
3	Foguetão	"Stand by Me" by Ben E. King	undisclosed	SAFE
4	Tubarão	"Let Me Entertain You" by Robbie Williams	undisclosed	SAFE

=== Episode 12 (9 February) ===
- Guest performance: Camaleão (Inês Lopes Gonçalves) sings "Wrecking Ball" by Miley Cyrus

Performances on the twelfth episode
#	Stage name	Song	Identity	Result
1	Rato	"Si Antes Te Hubiera Conocido" by Karol G	RISK	
2	Abacate	"Bailando" by Enrique Iglesias	RISK	
3	Foguetão	"I Have Nothing" by Whitney Houston	RISK	
4	Coala	"As Meninas da Ribeira do Sado" by Adiafa	RISK	
5	Elefante	"Padam Padam" by Kylie Minogue	WIN	
6	Maçaroca	"Menina Solta" by Giulia Be	RISK	
7	Tubarão	"I Want to Break Free" by Freddie Mercury	RISK	
Sing-off 1 details			Identity	Result
1	Abacate	"Bella Ciao" by Valdir Anzolin	undisclosed	SAFE
2	Foguetão	"Purple Rain" by Prince	MATAY	OUT
3	Coala	"Preço Certo" by Pedro Mafama	undisclosed	SAFE
Sing-off 2 details			Identity	Result
1	Rato	"Don't Stop the Music" by Rihanna	undisclosed	SAFE
2	Maçaroca	"O Mundo Vai" by Ivete Sangalo	undisclosed	SAFE
3	Tubarão	"Dragostea Din Tei" by O-Zone	Diogo Martins	OUT

=== Episode 13 (16 February) ===
- Guest performance: Teca (Cláudia Borges) sings "Good Luck, Babe!" by Chappell Roan

Performances on the thirteenth episode
#	Stage name	Song	Identity	Result
1	Abacate	"La Llorona" by Chavela Vargas	RISK	
2	Rato	"Yummy" by Justin Bieber	WIN	
3	Maçaroca	"Terremoto" by MC Kevinho ft. Anitta	RISK	
4	Elefante	"Is This Love" by Bob Marley	WIN	
5	Coala	"O Burrito" by Fernando Correia Marques	RISK	
Sing-off details			Identity	Result
1	Abacate	"Cielito Lindo" by André Rieu	undisclosed	SAFE
2	Maçaroca	"Rapunzel" by Daniela Mercury	undisclosed	SAFE
3	Coala	"Bamboléo" by Gipsy Kings	Gonçalo da Câmara Pereira	OUT

=== Episode 14 (23 February) ===
- Guest performance 1: Camaleão (Victória Guerra) sings "Umbrella" by Rihanna
- Guest performance 2: KIK (Miguel Costa) sings "Can't Stop the Feeling!" by Justin Timberlake

Performances on the fourteenth episode
#	Stage name	Song	Identity	Result
Round one
1	Abacate	"La Bicicleta" by Carlos Vives and Shakira	RISK	
2	Rato	"Toxic" by Britney Spears	RISK	
3	Maçaroca	"Tô Nem Aí" by Luka	RISK	
4	Elefante	"Desenrola Bate Joga de Ladin" by L7nnon & Os Hawaianos	WIN	
Round two
1	Abacate	"Maravilhoso Coração" by Marco Paulo	RISK	
2	Rato	"Dialectos de Ternura" by Da Weasel	WIN	
3	Maçaroca	"Sorte Grande" by Ivete Sangalo	RISK	
Sing-off details			Identity	Result
1	Abacate	"Despacito" by Luis Fonsi & Daddy Yankee	Marco Rodrigues	OUT
2	Maçaroca	"Arerê" by Ivete Sangalo	undisclosed	SAFE

=== Episode 15 (2 March) ===
==== Round one ====
Performances on the final episode
#	Stage name	Song	Duetpartner	Result
1	Rato	"Loucamente" by D.A.M.A.	D.A.M.A.	WIN
2	Maçaroca	"Despertar" by Nininho Vaz Maia	Nininho Vaz Maia	RISK
3	Elefante	"Castelo de Cartas" by SYRO	SYRO	RISK
Sing-off details			Identity	Result
1	Maçaroca	"Faz Gostoso" by Blaya	undisclosed	SAFE
2	Elefante	"Get Lucky" by Daft Punk ft. Pharrell Williams & Nile Rodgers	Bruno de Carvalho	THIRD

==== Round two ====
#	Stage name	Song	Duetpartner
1	Maçaroca	"És Tão Boa" by Herman José	Ricardo Pereira (Brócolo)
2	Rato	"A Moda Do Pisca Pisca" by Ruth Marlene	Fátima Lopes (Castor)

==== Round three ====
#	Stage name	Song	Identity	Result
1	Maçaroca	"Lento" by Daniel Santacruz	Micaela	WINNER
2	Rato	"Despechá" by Rosalía	Júlia Palha	RUNNER-UP

== New Year's Special (2021) ==
Performances on the special episode
#	Stage name	Song	Identity	Result
1	Coruja	"Hung Up" by Madonna	Jessica Athayde	OUT
2	Robot	"20 Anos" by José Cid	undisclosed	WIN
3	Dinossauro	"Proud Mary" by Tina Turner	Conceição Lino	OUT
4	Viking & Gato	"Just Give Me a Reason" by Pink ft. Nate Ruess		
5	Leão	"Ain't No Sunshine" by Bill Withers	Lourenço Ortigão	OUT
5	Borboleta	"Não Me Importo" by Carolina Deslandes	undisclosed	WIN
6	Poodle	"Ali-Babá" by Doce	Júlia Pinheiro	OUT
7	Esqueleto & Cisnes	"Parte-me o Pescoço" by Agir		
8	Coelho	"Piradinha" by Gabriel Valim	João Catarré	OUT
9	Tigre	"Rude Boy" by Rihanna	undisclosed	WIN
10	Gelado	"Maravilhoso Coração" by Marco Paulo	João Baião	OUT
11	Dragão & Galo	"Crazy Little Thing Called Love" by Queen		
12	Rainha de Copas & Polvo	"Let's Get Loud" by Jennifer Lopez		
Sing-off details			Identity	Result
1	Robot	"20 Anos" by José Cid	Dr. Almeida Nunes	RUNNER-UP
2	Borboleta	"Não Me Importo" by Carolina Deslandes	Andreia Rodrigues	THIRD
3	Tigre	"Rude Boy" by Rihanna	Sara Matos	WINNER
