= Agua Fresca =

Agua Fresca may refer to:

- Aguas frescas, a type of soft drink
- Agua Dulce people, former tribe in Florida
- Amor d'água fresca, Portuguese entry in 1992 Eurovision song contest
