= List of number-one singles of 2000 (Portugal) =

The Portuguese Singles Chart ranks the best-performing singles in Portugal, as compiled by the Associação Fonográfica Portuguesa.

Week	Song	Artist	Reference
27/2000	"It's My Life"	Bon Jovi	
28/2000	"It's My Life"	Bon Jovi	
29/2000	"Desert Rose"	Sting with Cheb Mami	
30/2000	"Desert Rose"	Sting with Cheb Mami	
31/2000	"Desert Rose"	Sting with Cheb Mami	
32/2000	"Desert Rose"	Sting with Cheb Mami	
33/2000	"Desert Rose"	Sting with Cheb Mami	
34/2000	"Take a Look Around"	Limp Bizkit	
35/2000	"Take a Look Around"	Limp Bizkit	
36/2000	"Take a Look Around"	Limp Bizkit	
37/2000	"Take a Look Around"	Limp Bizkit	
38/2000	"Take a Look Around"	Limp Bizkit	
39/2000	"Music"	Madonna	
40/2000	"Music"	Madonna	
41/2000	"Music"	Madonna	
42/2000	"It Feels So Good"	Sonique	
43/2000	"No Heu Corpo"	Gonçalo	
44/2000	"Beautiful Day"	U2	
45/2000	"Beautiful Day"	U2	
46/2000	"Beautiful Day"	U2	
47/2000	"Beautiful Day"	U2	
48/2000	"Beautiful Day"	U2	
49/2000	"Beautiful Day"	U2	
50/2000	"Lady (Hear Me Tonight)"	Modjo	
51/2000	"Beautiful Day"	U2	
52/2000	"Lady (Hear Me Tonight)"	Modjo	
