= Ana Vidal =

Spanish-American poet and journalist

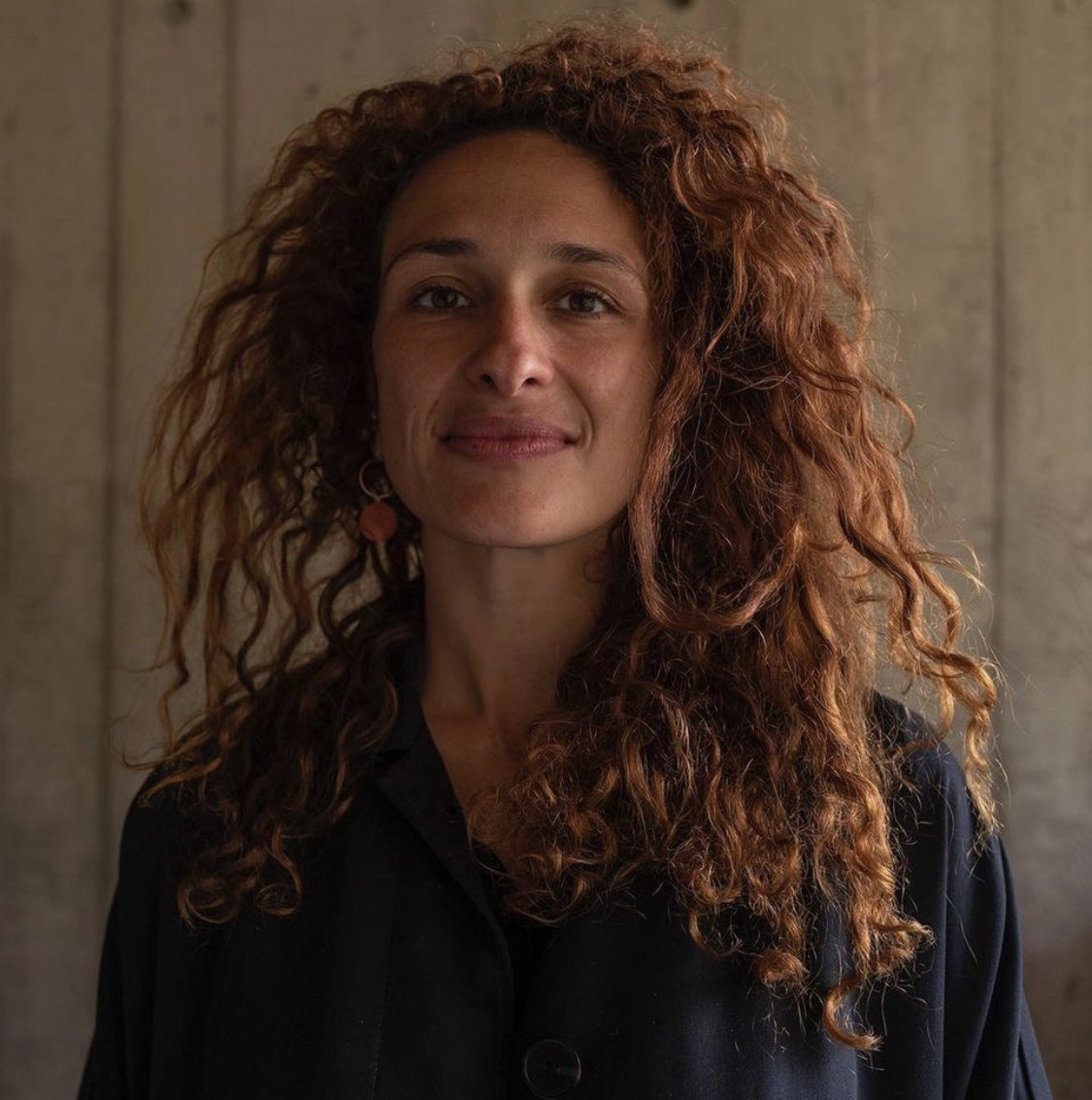
- Ana Vidal in 2023 by Pascal Perich
- Born: 1984 (age 41–42); Dolores de Pacheco, Murcia, Spain.
- Education: Complutense University of Madrid (BA, MA), Helsinki University (MA) and UNED (PhD)
- Occupations: Poet; Journalist; Writer; Death Doula
- Writing career
- Genres: Poetry, non-fiction, novel, journalism
- Website: www.anavidalegea.com

Ana Vidal (born 1984), also known as Ana Vidal Egea, is a Spanish–American poet, writer and journalist based in New York.

== Career ==
She earned her doctorate in Comparative Literature at the age of 26, after studying Journalism in Spain and Finland, and later moved to the U.S.

Throughout her career, she has led projects for Google, Meta, and TikTok. She created a World Poetry Day campaign for Google Assistant in Spain, after which users were able to request poems by Spanish poets, including Cervantes Prize winner Antonio Gamoneda, and hear the verses read in the poet’s own voice through the Assistant.

=== Social Journalism ===
Since 2017, she has been a contributor to El País, reporting from New York. She has focused on the societal implications of AI.

Her work includes interviews with figures in technology, culture, and academia, among them Meredith Whittaker, Kate Crawford, Timnit Gebru, Jane Mansbridge, Joan Wallach Scott, the social psychologist Jonathan Haidt, and the historian Robert Peckham. She has also written profiles of the activists Huwaida Arraf and Melanie Joy, the writers Miranda July and Sigrid Nunez, and the academic Cornel West.

In March 2024, she was awarded the Carmen de Burgos Feminist Outreach Award by the Association of Historical Studies on Women and the Vice Chancellor's Office for Equality at the University of Malaga for her article 'Late Recognition, What Good Is It?' published in El País newspaper, around the work of the artist Faith Ringgold.

In May 2024, she joined the newly launched U.S. edition of El País, dedicated to Hispanic news. Her coverage included not only immigrant and refugee experiences but also the work of Latin American artists reshaping the cultural landscape. She conducted in-depth interviews with María Magdalena Campos-Pons, Carlos Martiel, José Parla and Regina José Galindo. alongside literary figures such as Valeria Luiselli, Marie Arana, Lina Meruane or Selva Almada.

=== Creative writing ===
Vidal has written novels, poetry, non-fiction, and short stories. As a poet, she has served as the representative for Spain at the Vienna Latin American Poetry Festival 2018, the Miami Book Fair, and the FILNYC. In the prologue to her first book, poet Amalia Iglesias defined her as "the voice of a generation," referring to young Spaniards in the diaspora. Her poem "Nosotros" was adapted into a visual format by RTVE.

Based on her experience as an end-of-life doula, Vidal launched the project La Buena Muerte in 2019. She also hosts the first Spanish-language podcast about death, Hablemos de la muerte.

== Published books ==
- Cómo acompañar a morir. Una guía práctica para doulas del final de la vida y cuidadores (Non-fiction, La esfera de los libros, 2022)
- Todo este espacio (Poetry, Prensas Universidad de Zaragoza, 2019)
- La oscura boca del mundo (Novel, Lacre, 2017)
- Cuaderno de Asia (Poetry, Amargord, 2016)
- Dolores-Manhattan (Poetry, La Fea Burguesía, 2016)
- Noches Articas (Novel, Baile del sol, 2012)
- La otra vida (short-stories, Traspiés 2010)

== Honors and recognition ==
- 2024. Carmen de Burgos Feminist Outreach Award for the article 'What Good Is It?' published in the newspaper El País. The award is granted by the Association of Historical Studies on Women and the Vice Chancellor's Office for Equality at the University of Malaga (Spain).
- 2017. Jury Award "Get married at the airport" at Los Angeles Independent Film Forum (USA).
- 2017. Best Documentary "Get married at the airport" at Los Angeles Independent Film Forum (USA).
- 2017. Best Experimental movie "Get married at the airport" at Los Angeles Independent Film Forum (USA).
- 2017. Best Woman Filmmaker, Barcelona Planet Film festival (Barcelona, Spain).
- 2014. Finalist Adonais Poetry Award (Madrid, Spain).
- 2014. Winner "Premio Neurona" Festival de cortometrajes 'Ser o no ser" (Murcia, Spain).
- 2012. Winner "Todos somos diferentes" XVI edition. INJUVE (Madrid, Spain)
- 2009. Winner "La voz+ joven 2009" Obra Social Caja Madrid- La Casa encendida.
- 2009. Winner Lobher short stories award (La Rioja, Spain)
- 2009. Winner "Voces Nuevas 2009" award. Torremozas (Madrid, Spain)
- 2006. Finalist Booket Young Talent, PLANETA (Madrid, Spain)
- 2005. Finalist El Fungible. Suma de Letras (Madrid, Spain)
- 2001. Winner XV Internacional Poetry award "Infant Blais" Bajo Llobregat. (Barcelona, Spain)
- 2005. Finalist Literary Awards Murciajoven (Murcia)
