= Luís Represas =

Portuguese singer and composer (1956–2026)

- Born: Luís Paulo Fontes Represas; 24 November 1956; Lisbon, Portugal
- Died: 22 July 2026 (aged 69); Lisbon, Portugal
- Occupations: Singer composer

Luís Paulo Fontes Represas (24 November 1956 – 22 July 2026) was a Portuguese singer and composer.

== Life and career ==
=== Early career ===
Luís Represas showed a strong interest in music from an early age, as demonstrated by the fact that he bought his first guitar at the age of 13. In 1976, he founded the band Trovante together with João Gil, João Nuno Represas, Manuel Faria and Artur Costa. They were later joined by Fernando Júdice, José Martins and José Salgueiro. The group became one of the defining names of Portuguese popular music in the post-25 April period, and Represas remained its lead singer until the band's breakup. During the band's 16-year existence, he took part in numerous international festivals and memorable concerts in Portugal, including the 1984 concerts at the Coliseus, attended by the President Mário Soares, and the 1986 performances. In 1988, the band took the ambitious step of performing at Campo Pequeno, inaugurating the era of Portuguese artists producing their own large-scale concerts under their own name.

In 1992, Trovante disbanded, and Luís Represas began his solo career.

In 1993, Luís Represas withdrew to Havana to distance himself from his past while at the same time experiencing new musical influences, finding the space to compose new songs with the collaboration of Portuguese bassist Nani Teixeira and the renowned Cuban singer-songwriter Pablo Milanés. Together, they created one of the best-known duets in Portuguese music, Feiticeira! Miguel Nuñez, pianist and musical director for Pablo Milanés, was responsible for the arrangement and later became the musical director for Luís Represas's new songs.

The album Represas was thus born, recorded entirely in Portuguese and Spanish to bring his songs to a wider audience through these two editions.

In 1994, after performing live throughout the country, Represas sold out Lisbon's most iconic concert venue, the Coliseu dos Recreios, for two consecutive nights. The concert was broadcast by RTP.

He also recorded a series of 26 television programmes for RTP entitled A Música dos Outros, which he hosted, interviewing and performing duets with 26 of Portugal's most important musicians.

At the invitation of Maestro Ariel Ramires, he performed the composer's Misa Criolla at the CCB in Lisbon over two completely sold-out nights.

In 1995, he began composing his second album, Cumplicidades, recorded in Lisbon, featuring collaborations with the internationally acclaimed Portuguese jazz pianist Bernardo Sassetti and the renowned master of the uilleann pipes and low whistles, Davy Spillane. Following a successful tour, he accepted the challenge of performing at the Grand Auditorium of the Centro Cultural de Belém for four consecutive sold-out nights. These performances gave rise to the double live album Ao Vivo no CCB, which was awarded double platinum status.

In September 1995, he performed as the soloist in one of the most emblematic works of Argentine culture, Misa Criolla. Together with the composer himself, Ariel Ramirez, the distinguished figure of Argentine music, his son, pianist Facundo Ramirez, percussionist Domingo Cura and the Choir of S. Carlos, he performed at the Centro Cultural de Belém in Lisbon for two memorable nights.

In 1997, he once again performed Misa Criolla, this time at the Church of S. José in Ponta Delgada, Azores, with the Coral de S. José and orchestra, in a performance that also featured José Graça as a soloist.

In 1998, Luís Represas released his fourth album, A Hora do Lobo, marking his reunion with Miguel Nuñez and resulting in an album filled with intense and captivating melodies. The title track, A Hora do Lobo, featured Spanish musician Pedro Guerra, who was extremely popular in neighbouring Spain. The album led to numerous performances throughout Portugal and a special appearance at a memorable concert during EXPO 98 on the day the exhibition welcomed its 100,000th visitor. On 12 May 1999, at the invitation of the President Jorge Sampaio, Represas reunited with Trovante for a memorable concert at the Pavilhão Atlântico in Lisbon. This emotional reunion resulted in the double live album Uma Noite Só, which achieved double platinum status. Also in 1999, Represas accepted the invitation to perform, in the Portuguese version, the original songs by Phil Collins for the soundtrack of Disney's animated film Tarzan. This was followed by the recording of Elton John's theme song for The Lion King II: Simba's Pride.

In December 1999, he took part in the Handover of Macau to the People's Republic of China.

=== 2000s ===
In 2000, following his involvement in the Timorese cause, Luís Represas was invited by the then President Jorge Sampaio, to travel to Timor on an official visit, bringing with him the song Timor, which had become an anthem for the territory's independence and peace. He later returned to the country, this time at the invitation of Xanana Gusmão, to take part in the celebrations marking the first anniversary of the referendum that chose the path of independence for the territory. In April 2000, he travelled to Brazil to perform two concerts in Rio de Janeiro (Ipanema Beach) and São Paulo (Ibirapuera Park) before audiences of thousands, sharing the stage with Daniela Mercury.

In 2001, Luís Represas recorded his fourth solo album in Spain, entitled Código Verde, produced by Jose Antonio Romero and featuring, among others, Antonio Serrano and Martinho da Vila.

Represas celebrated 25 years of his musical career with concerts at the Pavilhão Atlântico and the Coliseu do Porto, accompanied by the Orquestra Sinfónica Juvenil under the direction and arrangements of Maestro José Calvário. Special guests included Fausto Bordalo Dias, Davy Spillane, Bernardo Sassetti, Manuel Faria and João Gil.

In September, he launched his new project, Reserva Especial, a collection of 21 landmark songs from world music arranged by José Calvário and recorded in Prague with the National Orchestra of the Czech Republic and in London.

In May 2002, at the invitation of Swatch, he composed the song Quero uma Casa deste Tamanho, released together with two previously unpublished recordings from the 25 Anos de Música concert at the Pavilhão Atlântico. The proceeds were donated to the charitable institution Ajuda de Berço. He also performed two concerts at the Teatro Nacional in Havana and another at the renowned Habana Café, under the musical direction of Miguel Nuñez, inviting Compay Segundo and Suylen Milanés as guests. He was the first Portuguese artist to perform large-scale concerts in Cuba.

In October 2003, Luís Represas released his new studio album, Fora de Mão, recorded between Portugal, the Czech Republic and Cuba. The album featured musicians who had known each other for many years, including Luis Fernando, Miguel Núñez and Osmany Sánchez.

In the summer of 2004, he performed on the Mundo Stage at Rock in Rio Lisboa, where tens of thousands of fans witnessed a memorable performance.

In March 2005, Angolan musician Raul Indipwo celebrated his 50th anniversary in music with a concert featuring Luís Represas, Mariza, Bonga and Pedro Jóia as guest performers.

On 10 June, Portugal Day, Camões Day and the Day of the Portuguese Communities, he was awarded the Order of Merit by the President of the Republic, Dr. Jorge Sampaio.

In 2006, he released the album A História Toda, which brought together an extensive repertoire of his greatest successes on CD and DVD. It was recorded during the concerts celebrating his 30th anniversary as a performer, which quickly sold out the Coliseu do Porto and, once again, the Grand Auditorium of the CCB for two consecutive nights. A very special guest was the Cuban singer-songwriter Pablo Milanés, with whom Represas performed Feiticeira live for the first time, 13 years after its original recording.

He once again appeared on stage at the Pavilhão Atlântico alongside Maestro José Cura during the III Gala of the Portuguese Association Against Leukaemia on 25 January 2007. He had also participated in previous editions in 2002 and 2007, together with other artists lending their voices to the cause.

In 2008, he travelled to Brazil to record the album Navegar é Preciso, produced by Marco Mazzola and Martinho da Vila, featuring guest appearances by Martinho da Vila and Brazilian artist Zélia Duncan.

Also in 2008, Luís Represas collaborated with Bahian singer Margareth Menezes. Together they performed Represas's song Um Caso a Mais on the Brazilian artist's CD and DVD, presented with a new arrangement and musical direction by Marco Mazzola, one of the leading producers of Música popular brasileira (MPB).

Other major Brazilian artists, including Gilberto Gil and Carlinhos Brown, also appeared on the CD/DVD. At Margareth Menezes's invitation, Represas took part in the Bahia Carnival on the singer's trio elétrico, where they performed Um Caso a Mais, among other songs. They later reunited for another performance at the Concha Acústica in Salvador, Bahia.

Olhos nos Olhos, his ninth solo album, released in 2008, was recorded entirely in Cuba under the musical direction of Miguel Nuñez. It featured special guest appearances by Brazilian singer Simone, Cubans Pablo Milanés and Liuba Maria Hevia, and the National Orchestra of Cuba conducted by Maestro Enrique Pérez Mesa, among others. In the words of Luís Represas, "this album was a reunion with myself, with the most sincere way of being who I am." The album consists of 12 tracks, 11 of them original compositions and a new version of Colíbri. Represas wrote most of the music and lyrics, collaborating with Ana Vidal, João Monge, João Gil and Margarida Pinto Correia. The accompanying tour included numerous performances throughout Portugal, and in 2009 the album was officially presented during two very special concerts. Campo Pequeno and the Coliseu do Porto were chosen as the prestigious venues to celebrate the success of the album, with special appearances by Simone, João Pedro Pais and Miguel Nuñez. These concerts gave rise to his next release, the CD/DVD Luís Represas – Ao Vivo no Campo Pequeno, issued in March 2010. The recording captures one of these performances and serves as a true best-of collection by an artist who had long since become one of the leading figures in Portuguese music.

=== 2010–2026 ===
The year 2010 also marked Represas's debut as a prose writer with the publication of the children's book A Coragem de Tição (Dom Quixote). It is a maritime fable in which the values of friendship and solidarity are celebrated as the principal means of achieving happiness.

In 2012, he became the first Portuguese artist to participate in the renowned Boleros de Oro Festival in Havana. He returned to Timor, where he performed a concert and recorded the Tetum-language version of the song Timor, written by Xanana Gusmão. In 2014, he recorded a new studio album, Cores, featuring Pedro Jóia and Guinean musician Manecas Costa.

In 2015, he recorded the DVD and CD Tratamento Acústico live at the CCB, inviting fado singer Ricardo Ribeiro and Mozambican musician Stewart Sukuma as guest performers. The concert featured songs from his most recent studio album, Cores, alongside some of his best-known works, performed on stage accompanied only by Carlos Garcia on acoustic piano and musical direction, Cicero Lee on double bass, and a four-voice vocal ensemble directed by Manuel Rebelo.

On 20 May 2016, he was awarded the Order of Timor-Leste by the President of Timor-Leste, Taur Matan Ruak.

On 10 June 2016, he performed a concert in Bissau, where he invited Guinean musician Binhan to join him on stage for a performance of their deeply meaningful song Paz. Once again on 10 June, this time in 2018 in Havana, with the support of the Camões Institute of the Cuban Ministry of Culture and the Hotel Nacional de Cuba, he performed at Teatro Mella under the musical direction of Miguel Nuñez, accompanied by Osmany Sánchez on drums, Sergio "El Indio" Félix on bass, and Alexei Sotero on percussion. Guest performers included Cuban artists Liuba Maria Hevia, David Torrenz and Mariana Nuñez. A video of the concert was later broadcast on Cuban television.

In 2018, he released his eighth studio album of original material, Boa Hora, featuring guest appearances by Carlos do Carmo, Ivan Lins, Jorge Palma, Paulo Gonzo, Mia Rose and Stewart Sukuma. The album was produced by Fred Ferreira, Manuel Faria and Francisco Faria.

Represas also took part in the Guadalajara International Book Fair in Mexico, accompanied by Miguel Nuñez's Quartet, and invited Mexican singer-songwriter Miguel Inzunza as a guest performer.

In 2019, he received the Pedro Osório Award from the SPA for the best album of 2018. In May and November, he presented Boa Hora in concerts at the Coliseu de Lisboa and Casa da Música in Porto, both of which sold out.

Throughout his career, he collaborated extensively with numerous musicians from the PALOP countries and Brazil, both in Portugal and by travelling to their countries of origin. This aspect of his work became one of the defining features of Luís Represas's career.

In February 2024, Luís Represas released his ninth studio album, MIRAGEM, produced by Brazilian pianist and music producer Ricardo Leão.

=== Death ===
On 22 July 2026, Represas died from lung cancer, which he had been privately battling for some time. He was 69.
