= José Luís Borga =

Portuguese singer, priest

José Luis Borga (born 19 November 1964) is a Portuguese Catholic priest, children's writer and Christian contemporary musician. He released six CDs, two of which reached Platinum, one a Double Platinum and one Gold, as well as writing four books.

He was ordained a priest in 1990 after studying at the seminary of Almada. In 2026 he is a member of the presbytery of the Diocese of Santarém.

== Albums ==
His albums include;

- Navegação
- Noite De Paz (with Isabel Cardoso)
- Cantar É Rezar Duas Vezes
- Que Fésta?! - featuring O sol já raiou and other songs.
- Alegrai-vos
- 10 Anos A Cantar o que é preciso

== Books ==
Borgas has written several children's books, including;

- The Pope is Francis! (to mark Pope Francis’ visit to Fatima in 2017)
- Who is Mary?
- What is the Nativity?
- What is the Passover?
