= Victória Guerra =

Portuguese actress and model

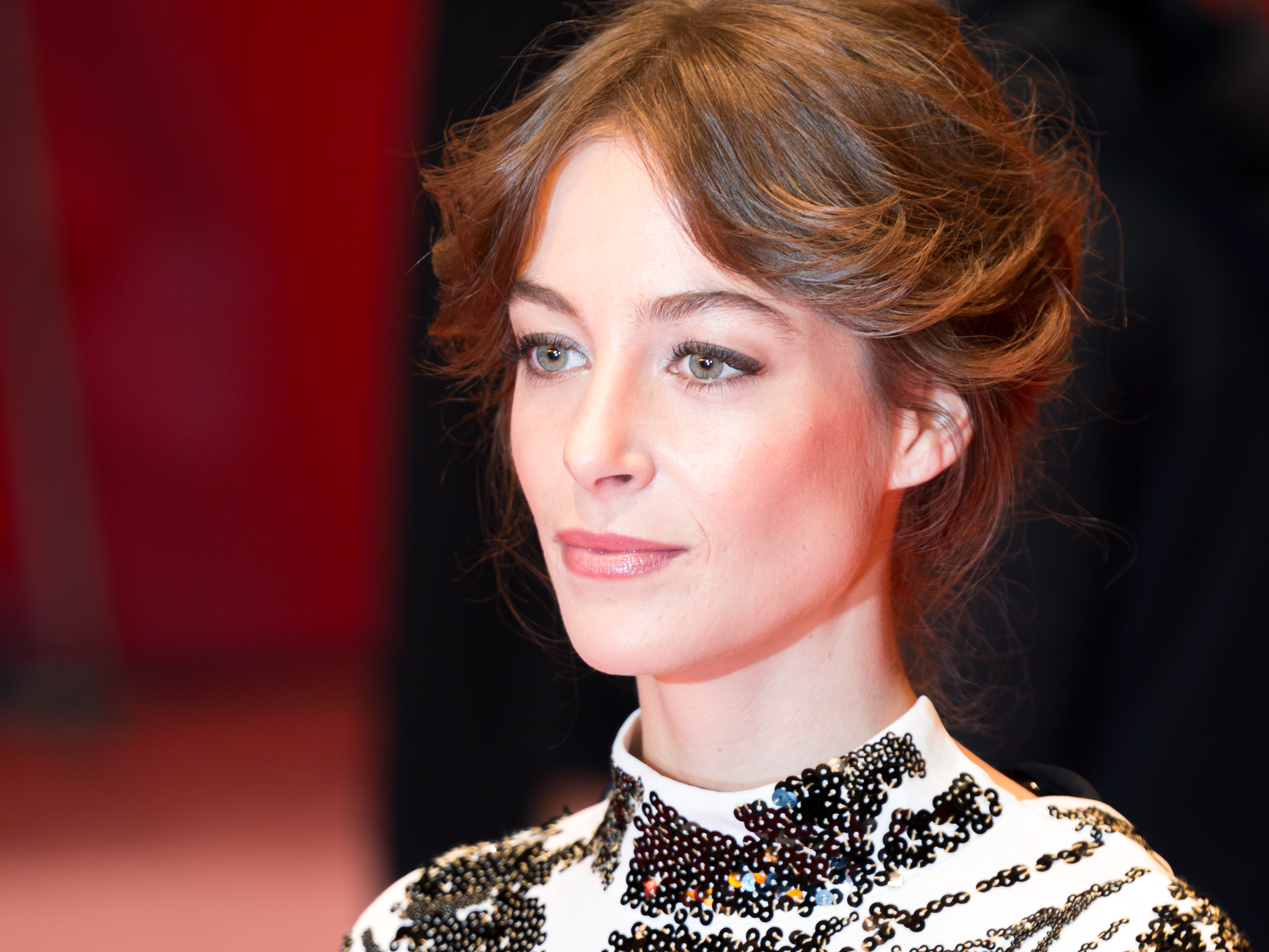
- Born: Victória Deborah de Sousa Lark Guerra; 16 April 1989 (age 36); Loulé, Faro, Portugal
- Occupations: Actress, model
- Years active: 2005–present
- Notable work: Amor Impossível, Variações, Glória, Dancin’ Days
- Awards: Golden Globe (Portugal), Sophia Award

Victória Guerra (born 16 April 1989) is a Portuguese actress and model. Guerra was born in Loulé, to an English mother and a Portuguese father. She moved to Lisbon at age fifteen to study in a private Catholic school, later studying journalism before turning to acting.

== Career ==
Her acting career began when she was cast in the teen drama series Morangos com Açúcar, which led her to pursue the performing arts full-time. Since then, Guerra has appeared in numerous Portuguese and international television series and films, establishing herself as one of Portugal’s most respected actresses.

Guerra is known for her roles in the films Amor Impossível (2015) and Variações (2019), as well as in television series including Dancin’ Days, Glória (2021), and Amor Maior. She has worked with renowned directors such as Valeria Sarmiento, Michael Sturminger, Andrzej Żuławski, Damian Harris, and Benoît Jacquot.

In 2013, Guerra was awarded the Portuguese Golden Globe for Best Revelation for her roles in Linhas de Wellington and Dancin’ Days. She won both the Sophia and Golden Globe awards for Best Actress in 2016 for her role in Amor Impossível. Her work has also received recognition at the Berlin International Film Festival, where she was named a European Shooting Star in 2017.

Her filmography includes Cosmos (2015), Real Playing Game (2013), Glória (2021), Santo (2022), A Herdade (2019), and O Caderno Negro (2018). Beyond screen acting, Guerra has also worked in theatre and as a model and has been featured on the cover of GQ magazine.

== Selected filmography ==
- Amor Impossível (2015) - as Cristina
- Variações (2019) - as Rosa
- Linhas de Wellington (2012) - as Clarissa Warren
- Glória (2021, TV series) - as Mia
- Dancin' Days (2012–2013, TV series) - as Vera Dias
- A Herdade (2019) - as Catarina Lopo Teixeira
- Cosmos (2015) - as Lena
- Sonhar com Leões (2024) - as Laurinda
- Santo (2022, TV series) - as Bárbara

== Awards and recognition ==
- Golden Globe, Portugal – Best Actress (2016, Amor Impossível)
- Sophia Award, Best Actress (2016, Amor Impossível)
- Golden Globe, Portugal – Revelation of the Year (2013, Linhas de Wellington, Dancin’ Days)
- European Shooting Star, Berlin International Film Festival (2017)
- Multiple nominations for best actress in Portuguese cinema and television

== See also ==
- Portuguese cinema
- Sophia Awards
