= Dina (singer) =

Portuguese singer (1956–2019)

- Born: Ondina Maria Farias Veloso; 18 June 1956; Carregal do Sal, Portugal
- Died: 11 April 2019 (aged 62) Lisbon
- Genres: Pop, Fado, Rock, Funk, Scat
- Occupations: Singer, composer, instrumentalist
- Instruments: Vocals, guitar

Dina (born Ondina Maria Farias Veloso; 18 June 1956 – 11 April 2019) was a Portuguese singer who was best known for her participation in the Eurovision Song Contest 1992 in Malmö.

== Biography ==
Dina first entered the Portuguese Eurovision selection, Festival da Canção, in 1980, finishing eighth with "Guardando em mim". She participated again in 1982 with two songs, but could only manage sixth and eighth. Dina finally got her chance in 1992, when her song "Amor d'água fresca" ("Fresh Water Love") won the competition and went forward as the Portuguese representative in the 37th Eurovision Song Contest. The contest took place on 9 May in Malmö, Sweden, where "Amor d'água fresca" finished in 17th place of the 23 entries.

Dina released six albums and composed music for many film and television drama productions. She continued to perform, and in September 2009 celebrated 30 years in the music business with a concert at the Teatro São Luiz in Lisbon.

Dina died on 11 April 2019 at age 62 following a battle with pulmonary fibrosis which she was suffering from for 13 years.

She came out as a lesbian in 1996.

== Albums discography ==
- 1975: Viva a Liberdade (EP)
- 1976: Madrugada (EP)
- 1982: Dinamite
- 1991: Aqui e agora
- 1993: Guardado em mim
- 1997: Sentidos
- 2001: O Melhor de 2: Dina/Mário Mata
- 2002: Guardado em mim 2002
- 2008: Da cor da vida

Preceded by Dulce Pontes with "Lusitana paixão"	Portugal in the Eurovision Song Contest; 1992	Succeeded by Anabela with "A cidade (até ser dia)"
