= Monica Sintra =

Portuguese singer (born 1978)

- Born: 10 June 1978 (age 48)
- Origin: Lisbon
- Genres: Pop, Pimba (Portuguese Country Music)
- Years active: 1995-present
- Website: monicasintra.com

Mónica Sintra (born 10 June 1978) is a Portuguese singer.

== Biography ==
Mónica was born in Lisbon, on June 10 of 1978.

At the age of 11, she joined the "Jovens Cantores de Lisboa". When she reached 15, she recorded her first album, Tu És O Meu Herói. Her next album, Afinal Havia Outra was released in 1998 and won her a platinum, the single soundtrack Na Minha Cama Com Ela. In 2006, Mónica released her album À Espera de Ti. In 2008, she launched the album Acredita.

On 8 December 2010 Mónica's son Duarte was born. This gave her an inspiration and good feelings for new themes. Mónica recorded the song "Meu Pequeno Grande Amor" in honour of the birth of her son Duarte.

In 2011, the singer released the album Um Grande Amor.

In 2018 Sintra revealed that she suffered from bulimia and anorexia.

== Discography ==
- 1995 Tu És O Meu Herói
- 1998 Afinal Havia Outra
- 1999 Na Minha Cama Com Ela
- 2001 Canta O Amor
- 2002 The Best Of
- 2002 Tudo Por Amor
- 2002 Sempre Tua
- 2003 O Meu Olhar
- 2004 O Melhor de Mónica Sintra
- 2006 À Espera de Ti
- 2008 Acredita
- 2011 Um Grande Amor
