= Carlos Paião =

Portuguese singer and songwriter

Carlos Manuel de Marques Paião (1 November 1957 – 26 August 1988) was a singer and songwriter from Portugal. He represented Portugal at the Eurovision Song Contest 1981 with the song "Playback". Carlos Paião was also a doctor, having graduated in medicine in 1983.

Some of his songs became national hits. In August 1988, Carlos Paião died in a car accident on N1 Road (old Lisbon-Porto road) in Ponte Amieira, near Rio Maior, Santarém district, while returning from a concert. The Nissan Urvan that Carlos Paião was travelling in collided head-on with a truck that was irregularly overtaking a broken car.

== Albums ==
- Algarismos (LP, EMI, 1982)
- Intervalo (LP, EMI, 1988)

== Singles ==
- "Souvenir de Portugal"/"Eu Não Sou Poeta" (Single, EMI, 1981)
- "Play-Back"/ "Playback" (English Version) (Single, EMI, 1981)
- "Pó de Arroz"/"Ga-Gago" (Single, EMI, 1981)
- "Marcha do 'Pião-das-Nicas'"/"Telefonia (Nas Ondas do Ar)" (Single, EMI, 1982)
- "Meia-Dúzia"/"Zero-a-Zero" (Single, EMI, 1982)
- "Vinho do Porto (Vinho de Portugal)"/ Instrumental (Single, EMI, 1983) (with Cândida Branca-Flôr)
- "O Foguete"/ Instrumental (Single, 1983) (with António Sala and Luís Arriaga)
- "Discoteca"/ "Tenho Um Escudo À Minha Frente" (Single, EMI, 1984)
- "Cinderela"/ "A Razão" (Single, EMI, 1984)
- "Versos de Amor"/ "Os Namorados" (Single, EMI, 1985)
- "Arco-Íris"/ "Lobo do Mar" (Single, EMI, 12/1985)
- "Cegonha"/ "Lá Longe Senhora" (Single, EMI, 12/1986)
- "Quando as Nuvens Chorarem"/ "Perfume" (Single, EMI, 1988)
- "Só Porque Somos Latinos" (Single, EMI, 1988)
- "Mar de Rosas" (Single, EMI, 1988)

== Other songs ==
- "Amar é Mais"
- "Bailarina (Nunca Te Direi)"
- "Caiu Redonda No Chão"
- "Caminhar"
- "Canção dos Cinco Dedos"
- "De-mão-em-mão"
- "Feito Num Oito"
- "História Linda"
- "Intervalo"
- "Miquelino I""
- "Não Há Duas Sem Três"
- "Noves Fora Nove"
- "Quatro Maços (É Só Tabaco)"
- "Refilar Faz Mal À Vesícula, Mais o Diabo a Sete"

Songs recorded by other artists such as Herman José, Joel Branco, Candida Branca Flôr, Amália Rodrigues, Nuno da Câmara Pereira, Peter Petersen, Florbela Queirós, Octávio de Matos, Alexandra, Rodrigo, Lenita Gentil, António Mourão, Ana, Carlos Quintas, Gabriel Cardoso, Pedro Couceiro, Vasco Rafael, Luis Arriaga, and Norberto de Sousa.

Awards and achievements
Preceded by José Cid with "Um grande, grande amor"	Portugal in the Eurovision Song Contest; 1981	Succeeded by Doce with "Bem bom"
