= Rouxinol Faduncho =

Rouxinol Faduncho (Portuguese: roughly Fadist Nightingale) is a Portuguese fictional character created by the singer and comedian Marco Horácio. He's a personification of the typical Portuguese man, similar to a Zé Povinho living in the 21st century. He has recorded two CDs, the first named "Grandes Êxitos de Rouxinol Faduncho" (Portuguese for "Rouxinol Faduncho's Big Hits"), launched on 5 December 2005. As he had "already fooled everyone with the first CD", he decided to launch a second one, named "Best On". Both CDs have songs featuring him as the singer, Paulo Valentim (guitarist) playing the Portuguese guitar, João Maria Veiga playing the guitar and Rodrigo Serrão playing the acoustic bass guitar.

Rouxinol's character is a fado lover, a married man, although he often sings like a bachelor with a very active sexual life. He was an illegal alien in Germany, where he sang fados in bars until he was thrown out. When he arrived in Portugal he decided to make a CD so he could afford to build a house in Barcarena for him, his wife and the love of his life, the china dogs (to whom he actually made a song called Cães de Loiça, Portuguese for China dogs). He also said that each copy of his CD you buy, you're helping two china dogs. This was said to be the Portuguese CD with most illegal downloads until May 2006.

Rouxinol sings in a very relaxed form, often using an unusual way of talking and popular expressions, giving wrong accents to almost every word, and getting rather confused when trying to speak English (once answering "I love you too" to a girl who told him "Fuck you"). Rouxinol's songs talk about the life of an average Portuguese adult male, going from fighting with his neighbour and complaining about the chronic Portuguese wildfires and the government to singing the theme songs of his favourite cartoons as a kid (Abelha Maia and Dartacão).

== Discography ==
- 2005 – Grandes Êxitos de Rouxinol Faduncho
- 2006 – BEST ON
- 2008 – Oh Oh Oh!
- 2010 – Ao Vivo e Na Muche
- 2012 – Formidável Bigode
