= Carlos Martiel =

Cuban-born installation and performance artist (born 1989)

- Born: 1989 (age 35–36); Havana, Cuba
- Education: Tania Bruguera, Cátedra Arte de Conducta
- Alma mater: Escuela Nacional de Bellas Artes San Alejandro
- Style: Endurance art, durational art, performance art, installation art
- Website: www.carlosmartiel.net

Carlos Martiel (born 1989) is a Cuban contemporary installation and performance artist.

== Early life and education ==
Carlos Martiel was born in 1989 in Havana, Cuba.

He graduated from Cuba's Escuela Nacional de Bellas Artes "San Alejandro" in 2009. In addition, he studied in the Cátedra Arte de Conducta (Behavior Art School) under Tania Bruguera from 2008 to 2010. Martiel lives and works in both Havana and New York City.

Martiel identifies as queer and Afro-Latinx, with Haitian and Jamaican ancestry. He has noted that his decision to become an artist is directly influenced by these identities, stating, "My art is absolutely political. I couldn't think of doing anything else because I was born in Cuba in the 1990s, because I am Black, because I have immigrant Haitian and Jamaican ancestry, because I am currently an immigrant, because I am queer, and because my art is the way I have found to express myself on the socio-political issues that not only affect my life, but those of others as well."

== Career ==
Martiel's work can be characterized as endurance art. His artistic practice uses his own body, often nude, in order to draw attention to the embodied experience of Blackness under systems of violence and exploitation. In his durational performances, Martiel frequently subjects himself to physical pain and self-harm. This includes piercing his skin with a miniature flagpole flying an American flag, having a pest exterminator spray his body with insecticide, compressing his legs under the weight of a pear-tree trunk, stitching the collar of a blue shirt to the skin around his neck, and having a piece of his own skin surgically removed and preserved in a gold medal that he had designed. Thematically, his works explore racism and racialization, gender, immigration, and the legacy of European colonialism in the United States.

Martiel's works are included in the collections of the Solomon R. Guggenheim Museum, the Pérez Art Museum Miami, and the Museum of Modern Art, Rio de Janeiro. His awards include a grant from the Franklin Furnace Fund (2016), a Grants & Commissions Program Award from the Cisneros Fontanals Foundation (2014), and the Arte Laguna Prize (2013). In 2021, he received a Latinx Art Fellowship from the Ford Foundation, Mellon Foundation, and U.S. Latinx Art Forum. In 2023, he became the first winner of the Maestro Dobel Latinx Art Prize by the Museo del Barrio. A designation awarding him a $50,000 grant and an exhibition at the Museo del Barrio, whose mission is to bring awareness and amplify the voices of underrepresented Latinx artists.

== Significant works ==
In his performance of Simiente (2014), Martiel presented his naked body covered in human blood of Mexican, Estonian, Italian, Venezuelan, English, and South Korean immigrants in the fetal position with hands in a prayer-like position. Similarly, Martiel performed South Body (2019) naked, piercing his right shoulder with a small American flag piercing. These performances raise questions about the treatment of minorities in eurocentric societies, particularly immigrants and Afro-Cubans like himself.

In his performance of Award Martiel, Carlos (2014), Martiel underwent a surgical procedure. Doctor Flor Mayoral, a professor in the Department of Dermatology and Cutaneous Surgery at the University of Miami Miller School of Medicine, performed the surgery and cleaned the piece of skin of any excess fat. After airdrying and dehydration, the specimen was placed inside a gold medal resembling those given to certain people by the Cuban government by art conservator, Flavia Perugini. In this piece, Martiel draws on the experience and lack of representation of Afro-Cubans in post-revolutionary Cuba.

During Dictadura (2015), Martiel was held down by a neck brace at the foot of a flagpole upon while the flags of greater than 20 Latin American and Caribbean nations were hoisted for the duration of an hour, drawing attention to totalitarianism and U.S. military imperialism in those countries.

== Performances and exhibitions ==
- Arquitectura para un cuerpo, Crystal Bridges Museum of American Art (2022)
- Monumento II, Solomon R. Guggenheim Museum, New York (2021)
- Black Bodies – White Lies, K Contemporary, Denver (2020)
- Afro Syncretic [group exhibition], King Juan Carlos I Center, New York University (2020)
- Sabor a Lagrimas, Sharjah Biennial 14, United Arab Emirates (2019)
- Gente de color (People of Color), Fourteenth Cuenca Biennial, Cuenca, Ecuador (2018)
- Intruder (America), AC Institute, New York (2018)
- América, Pacific Standard Time: LA/LA Performance Art Festival, Museum of Latin American Art, Long Beach (2018)
- Mediterráneo, 57th Venice Biennale (2017)
- CUBA: Tatuare la storia [group exhibition], Padiglione d'Arte Contemporanea, Palermo, Italy (2016)
- We the People, Biennale Internationale de Casablanca, Hassan II Mosque, Morocco (2016)
- Intersección, Museo de Arte Contemporáneo del Zulia (MACZUL), Maracaibo, Venezuela (2016)
- 30th Anniversary Havana Biennial, Wilfredo Lam Center of Contemporary Art (2014)
- Condecoración Martiel, Carlos, Cisneros Fontanals Art Foundation (2014)
- La Otra Bienal de Arte, Video Art of Central America and the Caribbean, La Macarena, Bogota, Colombia (2013)
- Vanishing Point, Nitch Museum, Naples, Italy (2013)
- Prodigal Son, Witch House, Liverpool, UK (2010)
