= Fernando Rocha =

Fernando Rocha (born 1975) is a Portuguese comedian, actor, and TV presenter, whose career as a professional performer began in 2000. He has performed in Portugal, and internationally, including Angola, which has a majority Portuguese speaking population, and in several Portuguese-descendant communities in the United States.
