= José Pinhal =

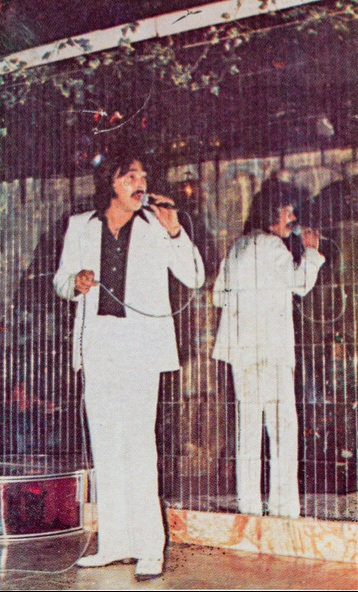
- The cover of Pinhal's first cassette.

Background information
- Also known as: Elvis Presley de Matosinhos Zé Nando
- Born: 1952; Santa Cruz do Bispo, Matosinhos, Portugal
- Origin: Portugal
- Died: 7 April 1993 (41 years old)
- Genres: Portuguese Popular Music
- Works: José Pinhal (Nova Força, 1984) Vol. 2 (Nova Força, 1985) Vol. 3 (Nova Força, 1991)
- Label: Nova Força
- Spinoffs: José Pinhal Post Mortem Experience

José Pinhal (Santa Cruz do Bispo, Matosinhos, 1952 – 7 April 1993) was a Portuguese singer-songwriter. Although he never enjoyed great success during his lifetime, his work aroused great interest among the general public almost 30 years after his death.

== Biography ==
José fought in the Portuguese Colonial War, where he lost a leg.

Pinhal's musical career began to take shape at the end of the 1970s. In 1979, in his first public performance, the song "Infância" made him the overall winner of the first Festival da Canção do Norte (Northern Song Festival). During this period, he used the stage name "Zé Nando".

He worked most of his musical career in the north of Portugal, playing mainly at festivals and nightclubs. He achieved modest success, but was widely recognised on the regional music scene and was even friends with other popular music artists, such as Marante and Ágata

He released three cassettes of his own music under the Nova Força label.

He died on 7 April 1993, the victim of a car accident while returning from a concert, leaving behind a 17-year-old daughter.
