= Santamaria (band) =

Portuguese Eurodance group

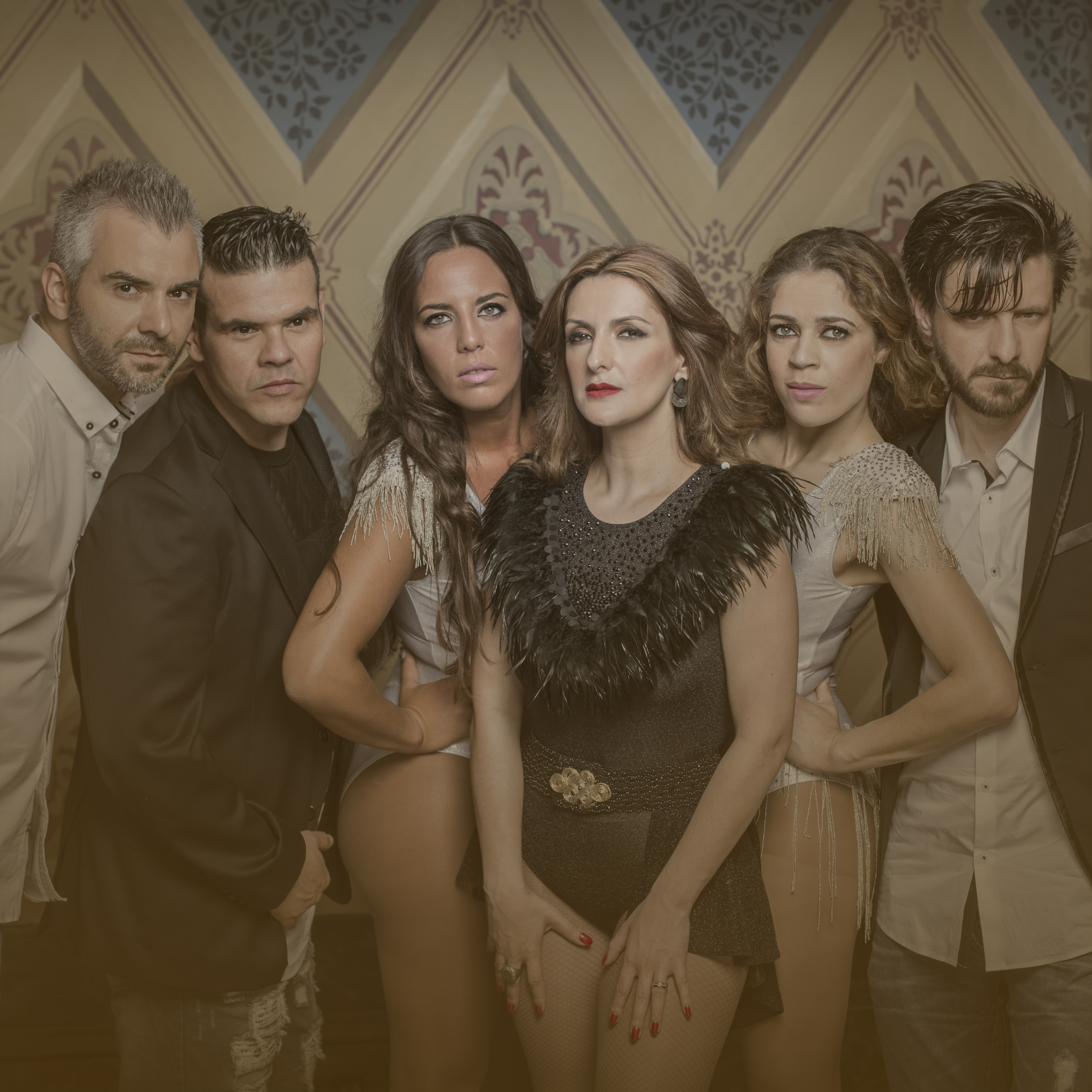

Background information
- Origin: Portugal
- Genres: Eurodance
- Years active: 1998–present
- Labels: Vidisco(1998 - 2005); Espacial(Since 2006)
- Members: Filipa Lemos(1979-); Luís Marante(1973); Lucas Júnior(1981-); Maria João Valente
- Website: www.santamaria.com.pt

Santamaria is a Portuguese Eurodance project, that has sold over 500,000 albums in Portugal during a career spanning circa a decade.

== History ==
=== Early years ===
Formed in Santa Maria de Lamas (hence the name Santamaria) a Portuguese civil parish located in the municipality of Santa Maria da Feira, in the district of Aveiro, Portugal, in 1997, Santamaria are the brainchild of producers Luís Marante and Tony Lemos and lead singer Filipa, Lemos' sister. At the time, Lemos was already an experienced studio man, having first emerged on the music scene in a duo with Filipa called Tó & Marlene, playing in county fairs during the summer seasons. Later, Filipa joined the short-lived act Taitibitileus, which managed to score a minor novelty hit with the song "O Meu Abião." Longing for a change of pace, the siblings, joined by common friend Marante, started dabbling with Euro-dance, all of them inspired by widely popular acts like Ace of Base, Whigfield, and Corona.

Recording enough songs for an album, Santamaria recruited two background singers and dancers, former model Dina Real and Yolanda. They shopped their demo CD around, and independent Portuguese label Vidisco took an interest. Consisting of re-recordings of all the tracks on the demo in more professional settings, debut album Eu Sei, Tu És... was released in early 1998. Boosted by the popular title track, the album went triple platinum in a year, even in the face of terrible reviews and a lack of airplay by the biggest radio stations in the country, their exposure mainly consisting of constant appearances in TV variety shows. Further hits with "Não Dá P'ra Viver Sem Ti" and the ballad "É Demais" consolidated Santamaria's success, leading to a successful spring and summer tour.

=== First change in line-up ===
As promotion was rolling on, Yolanda quit the group under acrimonious circumstances. A replacement was found in Magda Monteiro, thus forming a lineup that still remains unchanged. The group released its second album, Sem Limite, in 1999. This record marked the appearance of Rui Batista, who became the group's mainsongwriter (the first album had its lyrics written by Filipa) from that point forward, although he never became an official member. Keeping the formula of the debut, Sem Limite expanded on Santamaria's success by going platinum four times over in a year and becoming their most successful album to date, bolstered by hit singles "Tudo P'ra Te Amar," "Falésia do Amor," and "Quero-me Mais."

=== Globos de Ouro Award ===
Maintaining their one-album-a-year schedule, Voar arrived in 2000. Boasting a sound with similarities to the Vengaboys, it went triple platinum. In 2001, the fourth album Reflexus was released. This CD marked another arrival, this time in the guise of Brazilian songwriter/producer Luís Jr., who like Batista also became a permanent side collaborator with the group. Even though Reflexus sold less than its predecessors by going double platinum, Santamaria nevertheless managed to grab an award for Best Musical Act at the prestigious Portuguese arts and entertainment awards show Globos de Ouro.

With the release of fifth album 4 Dance in 2002, Santamaria made their first attempts at attaining an international following, in particular by recording their first completely English-sung track, "I Want You Anyway." Aside from not achieving their export ambitions, Santamaria saw a dip in popularity. Where previous albums had gone multi-platinum, 4 Dance only managed a single platinum plaque. Signaling the end of their contract with Vidisco, the group released a greatest-hits album in 2003, Boogie Woogie. They promoted the album by touring for almost two years straight. Even so, Boogie Woogie only managed a gold certification, suggesting that Santamaria's popularity was on the wane.

Breaking their album-per-year workload, Santamaria began their liaison with new label Espacial by releasing 2 Beat in 2005 it's they come back. It scored double platinum, returning some of their popularity. Returning to their typical album release schedule, 8 was issued in 2006.

== Discography ==
- 1998 Eu Sei, Tu És...
- 1999 Sem Limite
- 2000 Voar
- 2001 Reflexus
- 2002 4Dance
- 2003 Boogie Woogie (Best Of)
- 2005 2 Beat
- 2006 8
- 2006 Hit Singles (Best Of)
- 2007 Elements
- 2008 Virtual
- 2008 10 Anos - Ao Vivo (Live)
- 2009 Xplosion
- 2010 Play
- 2012 Let's Dance
- 2014 15 Anos - Ao Vivo (Live)
- 2015 Gold
- 2021 Eterno
