= Portugal in the Eurovision Song Contest 1992 =

- Eurovision Song Contest 1992
- Participating broadcaster: Radiotelevisão Portuguesa (RTP)
- Country: Portugal
- Selection process: Festival da Canção 1992
- Selection date: 7 March 1992

Competing entry
- Song: "Amor d'água fresca"
- Artist: Dina
- Songwriters: Ondina Veloso; Rosa Lobato de Faria

Placement
- Final result: 17th, 26 points

Participation chronology

Portugal was represented at the Eurovision Song Contest 1992 with the song "Amor d'água fresca", composed by Ondina Veloso, with lyrics by Rosa Lobato de Faria, and performed by Veloso herself under her stage name Dina. The Portuguese participating broadcaster, Radiotelevisão Portuguesa (RTP), selected its entry at the Festival da Canção 1992.

== Before Eurovision ==
=== Festival da Canção 1992 ===
Radiotelevisão Portuguesa (RTP) held Festival da Canção to select its entry for the Eurovision Song Contest 1992.

==== Format ====
Five semi-finals were held before the final, each with three songs. The winner of each semi-final, selected by an expert jury which included Adelaide Ferreira (who represented Portugal in the 1985 contest), entered the final, in which they were joined by five songs selected internally by RTP bringing the total number of songs to 10. The winner was decided through the votes of 22 regional juries.

==== Semi-finals ====
All semi-finals took place at the Estúdios do Lumiar in Lisbon, hosted by Júlio Isidro.

The first semi-final was held on 12 January 1992. An expert jury selected the winner to entered the final. "Chão de dança" performed by Olívia was disqualified after the semi-final.

Semi-final 1 – 12 January 1992
R/O	Artist	Song	Points	Place
1	Carla Saramago	"Louca ilusão"	22	2
2	Olívia	"Chão de dança"	25	1
3	Álvaro	"Num campo de margaridas"	17	3

The second semi-final was held on 19 January 1992. An expert jury selected the winner to entered the final. "É à noite" performed by Zé Mi was disqualified after the semi-final.

Semi-final 2 – 19 January 1992
R/O	Artist	Song	Points	Place
1	Tózé Morais	"Esta noite vou mais além"	14	3
2	Zé Mi	"É à noite"	30	2
3	Dina	"Amor d'água fresca"	40	1

The third semi-final was held on 26 January 1992. An expert jury selected the winner to entered the final.

Semi-final 3 – 26 January 1992
R/O	Artist	Song	Points	Place
1	Isabel Campelo	"Chuva de alegria"	28	2
2	Marco Quelhas	"Paisagens de amor"	27	3
3	Maria Emauz	"Outra noite"	31	1

The fourth semi-final was held on 2 February 1992. An expert jury selected the winner to entered the final.

Semi-final 4 – 2 February 1992
R/O	Artist	Song	Points	Place
1	Tony Carreira	"Romântico e sonhador"	16	3
2	São	"Baloiço ao vento"	22	2
3	Cristina Roque	"A tua cor café"	31	1

The fifth semi-final was held on 9 February 1992. An expert jury selected the winner to entered the final.

Semi-final 5 – 9 February 1992
R/O	Artist	Song	Points	Place
1	Luísa Basto	"Barço de navegantes"	30	3
2	Nani	"Eu sou Maria-Rapaz"	42	1
3	Os Safari	"Amo o sol"	40	2

==== Final ====
The final was held on 7 March 1992 at the São Luíz Theatre in Lisbon and was hosted by Ana Zanatti and Eládio Clímaco. The winner was decided through the votes of 22 regional juries.

The winner was "Amor d'água fresca", sung by Dina and composed by Ondina Veloso (aka Dina) and Rosa Lobato de Faria.

Final – 7 March 1992
R/O	Artist	Song	Points	Place
1	Rita Guerra	"Meu amor inventado em mim"	170	2
2	Dina	"Amor d'água fresca"	230	1
3	Luís Duarte	"Um amigo sempre à mão"	47	10
4	José Carvalho	"Foi aparecida"	100	8
5	Isabel Campelo	"Boa noite, tristeza"	141	4
6	Nani	"Eu sou maria-rapaz"	157	3
7	Os Safari	"Amo o sol"	140	5
8	Maria Emauz	"Outra noite"	52	9
9	Cristina Roque	"A tua cor café"	137	6
10	Diana	"Um adeus que demora"	102	7

== At Eurovision ==
Dina performed 8th on the night of the contest, following Sweden and preceding Cyprus. She received 26 points in total, placing 17th in a field of 23.

=== Voting ===
Points awarded to Portugal
Score	Country
12 points	
10 points	
8 points	Israel; Germany
7 points	
6 points	
5 points	Yugoslavia
4 points	
3 points	
2 points	Finland; Greece
1 point	Italy

Points awarded by Portugal
Score	Country
12 points	Malta
10 points	Germany
8 points	Italy
7 points	Israel
6 points	Iceland
5 points	Greece
4 points	Ireland
3 points	Austria
2 points	Cyprus
1 point	Denmark
