= Excesso =

Portuguese boy band

Excesso (1997-2002) was the first Portuguese boy band and marked the musical scene in Portugal in the late 1990s. It consisted of the following elements: Gonzo, Carlos, Melão, Duck and João Portugal. Among their biggest hits are the songs "Eu Sou Aquele" (the group's debut single, released in 1997), "Não Sei Viver Sem Ti", "És Loucura", "Dá-me O Teu Amor" and "Não Quebres O Meu Coração". It was one of the biggest Portuguese musical phenomena of the 1990s and, along with D'ZRT, can be considered the most successful boy band in the history of Portuguese music. Still profiting from huge popularity in the country, the Excesso disbanded in 2002 after internal disagreements culminating in the departure of Carlos from the band in 1999, followed by the departure of João Portugal. In 2023, they made a comeback which included live appearances on Portuguese television and shows at both Altice Arena in Lisbon and Super Bock Arena in Porto. Carlos Ribeiro, who in the meanwhile started a new life working as an Executive Housekeeping Manager through a hospitality career in Australia, also joined the group.
