= Night Train Media =

German production company

Night Train Media GmbH
- Industry: Entertainment
- Founded: 2020
- Founder: Herbert L. Kloiber
- Headquarters: Germany
- Services: Co-producing and co-financing films, series, and documentaries
- Website: nighttrainmedia.com

Night Train Media GmbH, also known as NTM, is a Munich-based production and financing company founded by Herbert L. Kloiber. NTM offices are located in Munich, London, Stockholm and Istanbul.

== Overview ==
NTM was founded in 2020 by Herbert L. Kloiber, who was previously managing director of Tele München Group or TMG. NTM focuses on English-language films, series, and documentaries for the international market. NTM offers development, licensing, co-production, and co-financing services.

In September 2020, NTM received long-term investment from private equity firm Serafin Group.

In July 2021, Night Train Media marked their first acquisition spree, by acquiring a majority stake in London-based British non-scripted distribution company BossaNova, led by Paul Heaney. The acquisition of British non-scripted distribution company BossaNova lead to Night Train Media's entry into the distribution market.

In July 2022, Night Train Media had acquired Swedish scripted distribution company Eccho Rights from Korean entertainment media group CJ ENM with Eccho Rights continued operating as an independent brand through its new parent company Night Train Media whilst Fredrik af Malmborg remained CEO of the acquired Swedish distribution company. Herbert L. Kloiber subsequently became the chairman and in September 2023 CEO of Eccho Rights.

In October 2022, Night Train Media made an entry into the British scripted production business by acquiring a majority stake in London-based British unscripted production company behind Salvage Hunters Curve Media, led by Emmy, BAFTA, RTS and Rose D'Or award-winning producers Camilla Lewis and Rob Carey. As part of the Curve Media acquisition deal, BBC Studios had sold its minority stake in unscripted production company to Night Train Media with Curve Media founders Camilla Lewis and Rob Carey continued to led the company under Night Train Media.

In September 2020, Night Train Media announced the co-development of The Ex-Wife, which was commissioned in April 2022 as one of the first series from Paramount+ UK. Starring Celine Buckens, Tom Mison and Janet Montgomery, The Ex-Wife was penned by Downton Abbey’s Catherine Steadman and featured on Channel 4's Gogglebox.

NTM's other TV series credits include: Catch Me a Killer (10 x 1 hour) for MNET, starring Charlotte Hope, based on a true story and book of the same name by Micki Pistorious; Fallen (8 x 1 hour), a fantasy series based on the book of the same name by Lauren Kate, starring Jess Alexander, Timothy Innes, Gjis Blom, Alexander Siddig and Sarah Niles; The Inheritance (4 x 1 hour) for Channel 5, starring Robert James Collier; The Catch (4 x 1 hour), an adaptation of T.M Logan's eponymous novel for Channel 5; Deadline (4 x 1 hour), starring Charlie Murphy and James D'arcy for Channel 5; The Holiday(4 x 1 hour), an adaptation of T.M Logan's bestselling novel of the same name for Channel 5, starring Jill Halfpenny; The Box (7 x 30 minutes) for Viaplay, starring Anna Friel, action thriller Safe Harbor (8 x 1 hour) from the co-creator of Ozark, Mark Williams, starring Charlie Murphy and Alfie Allen, and investigative drama series The Bombing of Pan Am 103 (formerly titled Lockerbie) (6 x 1 hour) for BBC and Netflix, starring Connor Swindells, Merritt Wever and Patrick J. Adams, about the 1988 flight disaster of Pan Am Flight 103 which was the deadliest terrorist attack in the history of the United Kingdom.

NTM's first feature film Rogue Agent was announced in 2021, starring James Norton and Gemma Arterton, based on the story of conman Robert Freegard. The film was released theatrically by IFC in the US on August 12, 2022. Romantic Comedy This Time Next Year, based on the book of the same name by Sophie Cousens and starring Sophie Cookson and Lucien Laviscount, is set for release in late 2024.

NTM has also produced documentary films The Man Who Stole The Scream and Missile from the East for Sky Documentaries. Its documentary series Vikings: The Rise and Fall was acquired worldwide by National Geographic in 2022 and was nominated for a Daytime Emmy in the category of Outstanding Educational and Informational Program.

== Productions ==
Release date	Project title	Notes
Aug. 25, 2021	The Box (TV Series)	co-production with Nice Drama; distributed by MGM, Viaplay, Stan; Episodes: Queen of the Box (Part I and II), The Sinner, The Dark, True Believer, The Last Hurrah, A Simple Story,
Sep. 24, 2021	Missile from the East (Documentary Film)	co-production with HLA Productions and Salon Pictures; distributed by Abacus Media Rights; Won Golden Palm and the Best Director Award at the Beverly Hills Film Festivals
Jun. 7, 2022	The Holiday (TV Series)	co-production with Chalkboard TV, Clapperboard Studios and Projector Pictures; distributed by All3Media International and Viaplay; starring Jill Halfpenny
Apr. 4, 2022	Deadline (TV Series)	co-production with Screene Scene, Paprika Studios Kft., Clapperboard Studios; distributed by Abacus Media Rights and Channel 5 Television, starring Charlie Murphy and James D'arcy
Jun. 24, 2022	Vikings: The Rise and Fall (Documentary Series)	co-production with Dash Pictures and National Geographic; nominated for a Daytime Emmy in the category of Outstanding Educational and Informational Program in 2023; awarded a Telly Award for History TV in 2023
Aug. 10, 2022	The Ex-Wife (TV Series)	co-production with BlackBox Multimedia and Clapperboard Studios; distributed by Paramount+ and BritBox International; starring Celine Buckens, Tom Mison and Janet Montgomery
Aug. 12, 2022	Rogue Agent (Film)	co-production with Anhinga Media, Great Point Media, Rabbit Track Pictures, Split Prism Media and The Development Partnership; distributed by IFC Films and AMC; starring James Norton and Gemma Arterton
Sep. 4, 2023	The Inheritance (TV Series)	co-production with Peer Pressure, Lonesome Pine Productions and Eccho Rights; distributed by Channel 5 Broadcasting; starring Robert James Collier
Dec. 18, 2023	The Man Who Stole the Scream (Documentary Film)	co-production with Curve Media
Mar. 4, 2024	Catch Me A Killer (TV Series)	co-production with Fired Up Films, Local Motion Pictures and ShowMax; distributed by UKTV, SBS on Demand, BBC First; screened in the International Panorama section at Series Mania 2024; awarded the British Film Designers Guild Award for Best Production Design for Light Entertainment TV; starring Charlotte Hope
Jun. 3, 2024	This Time Next Year (Film)	co-production with BlackBox Multimedia and Vargo; starring Sophie Cookson and Lucien Laviscount
2024	Fallen (TV Series)	co-production with Silver Reel, Globoplay and Hero Squared; starring Jess Alexander, Timothy Innes, Gjis Blom, Alexander Siddig and Sarah Niles
2025	Safe Harbor (TV Series)	co-production with Submarine; distributed by Videoland and Streamz; starring Alfie Allen, Charlie Murphy, Jack Gleeson, Martijn Lakemeier and Colm Meaney.
2025	The Bombing of Pan Am 103 (TV Series)	co-production with MGM Television, Toluca Pictures, World Productions; distributed by BBC One and Netflix; starring Connor Swindells, Merritt Wever and Patrick J. Adams
