= Baffoe =

Baffoe is a surname. Notable people with the surname include:

- Anthony Baffoe (born 1965), footballer
- Felix Baffoe (born 1986), footballer
- Frank Baffoe (born 1935), Ghanaian Economist, diplomat and businessman
- Kojo Baffoe (born 1972), businessman, entrepreneur, writer, poet, blogger, media consultant (television and print), producer, columnist, editor
