= Velaphi Ndlangamandla =

South African serial killer

- Born: c. 1966
- Other name: "The Saloon Killer"
- Conviction: Murder
- Penalty: 137 years' imprisonment

Details
- Victims: 19
- Span of crimes: April – September 1998
- Country: South Africa
- State: Mpumalanga
- Date apprehended: 10 September 1998

Velaphi Ndlangamandla (born c. 1966), known as the Saloon Killer after the type of gun he used, is a South African robber and serial killer.

== Early life ==
Velaphi Ndlangamandla was born around 1966.

== Crimes ==
Ndlangamandla killed 19 people between April and September 1998 in Mpumalanga by shooting them. He also stole items like ammunition, radios, jewellery, clothing, cash and food from dwellings.

He gained the moniker the "Saloon Killer" because he used a stolen .22 Anschütz rifle, commonly called a "saloon".

== Arrest and conviction ==
Forensic psychologist and investigator Micki Pistorius assisted with his arrest and conviction.

A police task team arrested Ndlangamandla at the Phoswa Village near Piet Retief on 10 September 1998. He was charged with 19 counts of murder, 9 of attempted murder, 6 of robbery, one of attempted robbery, 5 of housebreaking (3 with intent to steal and theft and 2 with intent to rob and robbery), indecent assault, illegal possession of a firearm and ammunition, and pointing a firearm.

In September 2000 Ndlangamandla was convicted of all charges, and sentenced to 137 years' imprisonment.

== In popular media ==
Ndlangamandla's case is featured in episodes 10 and 11 of the Showmax drama series Catch Me a Killer, released in February 2024. The series dramatises cases in which Micki Pistorius helps to obtain a conviction.

== See also ==
- List of serial killers in South Africa
- List of serial killers by number of victims
