= Sipho Thwala =

South African rapist and serial killer

- Born: Sipho Mandla Agmatir Thwala; KwaMashu, South Africa
- Other name: "The Phoenix Strangler"
- Penalty: Life imprisonment (506 years)

Details
- Victims: 16+
- Span of crimes: 1996–1997
- Country: South Africa
- Date apprehended: 14 August 1997

Sipho Mandla Agmatir Thwala is a South African rapist and serial killer who was convicted in 1999 for the murders of 16 women and 10 rapes. He was sentenced to 506 years in prison. Thwala was known by the moniker the Phoenix Strangler.

== Early life ==
Sipho Mandla Agmatir Thwala was born and raised in KwaMashu.

== Crimes ==
Thwala began his year-long rape and murder spree in 1996 in South Africa's KwaZulu-Natal province. His modus operandi was to lure local women into accompanying him through the sugarcane fields of Mount Edgecombe near the town of Phoenix with the promise of employment as domestic workers in nearby hotels. Once they were deep within the cane fields, Thwala would attack the women, bind them with their own undergarments and then rape and strangle them to death.

He relied on physical evidence of his attacks being destroyed through the common farming practice of burning cane fields, which set the police investigation back until a body was eventually discovered that had not yet been burned.

The killer became known as "the Phoenix Strangler".

== Arrest and conviction ==
Thwala was arrested in 1997 after South African police matched DNA found on the victims to DNA taken from Thwala in 1994 when he had been arrested and acquitted of a rape.

On 31 March 1999, the High Court in Durban found Thwala guilty of 16 murders and 10 rapes and sentenced him to 506 years in prison.

Thwala is being held at C Max Penitentiary in Pretoria, South Africa.

== In popular media ==
Thwala's case is featured in episodes 8 and 9 of the Showmax drama series, Catch Me a Killer, released in February 2024. The series dramatises cases in which forensic psychologist and investigator Micki Pistorius help to obtain a conviction.

== See also ==
- List of serial killers in South Africa
