= Christopher Mhlengwa Zikode =

South African rapist and serial killer

Christopher Zikode
- Born: Christopher Mhlengwa Zikode; Donnybrook, South Africa
- Other name: Donnybrook Serial Killer
- Penalty: 140 years (5 life sentences)

Details
- Victims: 18
- Span of crimes: 1994–1995
- Country: South Africa
- State: KwaZulu-Natal
- Date apprehended: 29 September 1995

Christopher Mhlengwa Zikode is a South African rapist and serial killer who was convicted in 1995 on eight counts of murder, five counts of rape, five counts of attempted murder, and two counts of indecent assault.

== Crimes ==
Christopher Mhlengwa Zikode terrorised the small, rural South African town of Donnybrook, KwaZulu-Natal. Over the course of two years, Zikode attacked households as well as single women traversing rural terrain. His typical modus operandi was to force entry into a household and shoot all male members of the family. He would then take the remaining woman/women into nearby fields or plantations and rape them repeatedly, on occasion for more than five hours.

== Arrest and conviction ==
Zikode was arrested for the first time in July 1995 for the attempted murder of Beauty Zulu. While on bail, he is known to have committed further crimes including one count of murder and two counts of attempted murder. He was rearrested on 29 September 1995.

Zikode was convicted in 1996, with the assistance of South African psychologist and criminal profiler Micki Pistorius, on eight counts of murder, five counts of rape, five counts of attempted murder, and two counts of indecent assault. He is, however, considered responsible for at least 18 murders and 11 attempted murders.

He was sentenced on 7 January 1997 to 140 years in prison.

== In popular culture ==
Zikode's case is featured in episode 5 of the Showmax TV series Catch Me a Killer.

== See also ==
- List of serial killers in South Africa
- List of serial killers by number of victims
