= Stewart Wilken =

South African serial killer

- Born: Stewart Wilken; 11 November 1966 (age 59); Boksburg, Gauteng, South Africa
- Other name: Boetie Boer
- Penalty: 7 life sentences

Details
- Victims: 10+
- Span of crimes: 1990–1997
- Country: South Africa
- Date apprehended: 1997

Stewart Wilken (born 11 November 1966), known as the Boetie Boer, is a South African serial killer, who was active in the coastal city of Port Elizabeth.

== Early life ==
Stewart Wilken was born on 11 November 1966 in Boksburg, South Africa. His father abandoned him and his two-year-old sister in a telephone booth when he was around six months old.

A domestic worker found the children and took them to the home of her employer, a man known as "Doep", who inflicted extreme physical and sexual abuse on Wilken over a period of around 18 months. His sister disappeared. When Wilken was around two, a couple called the Wilkens who lived next door adopted him, finding him malnourished and infested with lice. They named him Stewart Wilken, but he called himself "Boetie Boer" ("brother farmer"). The family moved to Port Elizabeth.

He did not do well at school, and behaved violently both at school and at home on occasion, leading to frequent punishment. He started smoking marijuana at the age of eight, and was sexually abused by a clergyman at the age of nine.

== Crimes ==
Wilken is regarded as a highly unusual serial killer, having killed individuals from two distinct victim types: female prostitutes and young boys. He also killed his adolescent daughter, Wuane. Wilken killed from 1990 until he was arrested in January 1997. He was active in Port Elizabeth, on the east coast of South Africa.

He killed his daughter, Wuane, who was born from his first marriage. He said that she had been sexually abused by her stepfather so he wanted to send her soul to God. He also killed Henry Bakers, the son of his second wife. He said during an interview with the police that he had sex with Henry's decomposing corpse. He also stated that he ate the nipples of one of his victims.

== Arrest and conviction ==
Wilken was charged with 10 counts of murder and five counts of sodomy on 3 February 1997. He was convicted of 7 counts of murder and two counts of sodomy on 20 February 1998. Wilken received seven life sentences and was further advised by Justice Chris Jansen that he would have received the death penalty had it still been available to him.

Forensic psychologist and investigator Micki Pistorius, who worked on the case, described Wilken as "one of the worst sadists I have ever met".

== In popular media ==
The five-part true crime documentary series Boetie Boer: Inside the Mind of a Monster was released by Showmax in October 2023. Directed by Jasyn Howes, the series features interviews with Wilken himself, as well as the family of one of his victims, Georgina Zweni, and his own surviving children, Sonika and Sergius. Certain events are recreated by actors, with Wilken played by Raven Swart.

Wilken's case is also featured in episode 7 of the Showmax drama series about Micki Pistorius, Catch Me a Killer, released in February 2024.

== See also ==
- List of incidents of cannibalism
- List of serial killers by number of victims
- List of serial killers in South Africa
