= The Bombing of Pan Am 103 =

2025 British television series

- Genre: Drama
- Created by: Jonathan Lee
- Developed by: Adam Morane-Griffiths
- Written by: Jonathan Lee; Gillian Roger Park
- Directed by: Michael Keillor
- Starring: Connor Swindells; Merritt Wever; Patrick J. Adams; Eddie Marsan
- Country of origin: United Kingdom
- Original language: English
- No. of episodes: 6

Production
- Executive producers: Simon Heath; Roderick Seligman; Steve Stark; Stacey Levin; Adam Morane-Griffiths; Sara Curran; Herbert L. Kloiber; Jonathan Lee; Michael Keillor; Gaynor Holmes
- Producer: Julia Stannard
- Running time: 55-59 minutes
- Production companies: World Productions; Toluca Pictures; Wild Card Films; Night Train Media; MGM Television

Original release
- Network: BBC One (UK)
- Release: 18 May – 2 June 2025
- Network: Netflix (Worldwide)
- Release: 30 July 2026

The Bombing of Pan Am 103 is a six-part British television drama, starring Connor Swindells, Merritt Wever and Patrick J. Adams. It is about the 1988 disaster of Pan Am Flight 103, which was the deadliest terrorist attack in British history. The series premiered on 18 May 2025 on BBC One in the UK and worldwide on 30 July 2026 on Netflix.

== Premise ==
The Bombing of Pan Am 103 focuses on the two investigations by the British and U.S. governments into the bombing on Pan Am Flight 103 after the explosion over the town of Lockerbie in Scotland in 1988.

== Cast and characters ==
- Connor Swindells as DS Ed McCusker
- Eddie Marsan as Tom Thurman
- Peter Mullan as DCS John Orr
- Lauren Lyle as June McCusker
- Phyllis Logan as Moira Shearer
- Tony Curran as DCI Harry Bell
- Patrick J. Adams as FBI Special Agent Dick Marquise
- Merritt Wever as Kathryn Turman
- James Harkness as DS Sandy Gay
- Amanda Drew as Linda Burman
- Molly Geddes as WPC Lauren Aitken
- Nicholas Gleaves as Allen Feraday
- Douglas Hodge as DCS Stuart Henderson
- Alastair Mackenzie as Alastair Campbell QC
- Kevin McKidd as DCS Tom McCulloch
- Dominik Tiefenthaler as Edwin Bollier
- Terence Maynard as Gabe Lepley
- Parker Sawyers as Phil Reid
- Adam Rothenberg as Neil Gallagher
- James Anderson as Thomas G. Plaskett

== Episodes ==
No.	Title	Directed by	Written by	Original release date	U.S. airdate	UK viewers (millions)
1	"Episode 1"	Michael Keillor	Jonathan Lee	18 May 2025	30 July 2026	3.10
After a Boeing 747 jetliner falls out of the sky over Lockerbie, Scotland, Detective Sergeant Ed McCusker of the Criminal Investigation Department (CID) investigates the aftermath. Lacking the technical expertise, Scottish police call the Federal Bureau of Investigation (FBI) for help. Some at the FBI feel they are entitled to lead the investigation, given that it was an American airline and the number US citizens, including some active duty military, were killed. They send FBI agent Tom Thurman, a veteran of a United States Army bomb disposal unit, to Scotland. The British government appoints Detective Chief Superintendent of Strathclyde Police John Orr as Senior Investigating Officer. The abrupt end of the cockpit recording indicates a bomb. Thurman finds crucial evidence on scene to confirm the suspicion. In a telephone exchange, Orr explains to Special Agent Dick Marquise, lead investigator for the FBI, that while the FBI are welcome to assist, Scottish police are in charge of the overall investigation.
2	"Episode 2"	Michael Keillor	Jonathan Lee	19 May 2025	30 July 2026	2.65
Evidence points to a bomb hidden in passenger luggage. The FBI suspects Khaled Jaafar, a US citizen with ties to Hezbollah, of unwittingly bringing it on board. The pallet with luggage from Heathrow Airport and Frankfurt Airport, where Jaafar boarded, seems to confirm this theory. Orr asks local volunteers to help clean up victims' possessions so they can be returned to the grieving families. Marquise and Orr make a deal to share evidence. The discovery of Jaafar’s intact bags exonerates him.
3	"Episode 3"	Michael Keillor	Jonathan Lee	25 May 2025	30 July 2026	2.66
On the regular route, the plane would have crashed in the ocean, taking all evidence with it. Rerouting due to wind sent it over Scotland, thus preserving everything. Singed pieces of a Toshiba radio circuit board link the crime to bomb maker Marwen Khreesat in Germany. Police there caught him red-handed with explosive material and such a radio in his car, but released him because of insufficient evidence weeks before the attack on the plane. Thurman conducts tests with radios packed with Semtex on luggage pallets that prove to the German police that the bomb came on board in Frankfurt. Marquise interviews Khreesat in Jordan, but with strict orders not to share information with the Scots. The bombmaker denies the device is his and Jordan’s secret service confirms he works as a mole for them. A victims' organization lobbies for better airline security. The luggage list finally released by the Germans shows that the bomb came from Malta via Frankfurt.
4	"Episode 4"	Michael Keillor	Gillian Roger Park	26 May 2025	30 July 2026	2.44
DCI Harry Bell goes to Malta and discovers that the bomb could have gotten on board as lost luggage on a rush delivery to the owner. Tracing a Maltese garment tag to a store, the proprietor clearly remembers his best sale ever to a Libyan customer who bought an odd collection of clothes. Victims' families berate Marquise at a press conference over the government telling airlines about a bomb threat to a Pan Am flight from Frankfurt without alerting the general public.
5	"Episode 5"	Michael Keillor	Gillian Roger Park	1 June 2025	30 July 2026	2.67
The investigations shift toward Libya’s External Security Organisation (ESO), blamed for many terrorist attacks including a subsequent bombing of a French airliner using a similar device. The CIA can link its timer to the ESO. Edwin Bollier, founder of the manufacturer Mebo, ties the timer directly to his contacts in Libya. He tipped off the CIA after the bombing but was dismissed as a lunatic. He and the Maltese shopkeeper identify Abdelbaset al-Megrahi, alias Abdusamad, as the suspect. Tracing of his contacts leads to Lamin Khalifah Fhimah, a Libyan airline employee at Malta International Airport. Without telling the Scots, Marquise makes a deal with the CIA to interview a Libyan mole, who confirms the details of the conspiracy.
6	"Episode 6"	Michael Keillor	Jonathan Lee	2 June 2025	30 July 2026	2.57
DCS Tom McCulloch takes over as third Senior Investigating Officer of the case. He has to handle an international trial of al-Megrahi and Fhimah in the Netherlands as a compromise with Libya. Promoted Detective Inspector McCusker takes on the difficult task of persuading and protecting witnesses, some of which hide in the US WITSEC program. Victims' advocates get funding for travel for the family members and a live feed from the courtroom for those unable to attend in person. Bollier gives confusing testimony. The ESO mole testifies from behind a screen to protect his identity, but cracks under cross examination. The shopkeeper is adamant about al-Megrahi. The judges unanimously convict him but acquit Fhimah.

== Production ==
=== Development ===
The series was commissioned in July 2023 by BBC One and Netflix. It was developed by MGM Television and Night Train Media alongside filmmaker Adam Morane-Griffiths, who had brought the project to them, and Sara Curran, in 2020. It is written by Jonathan Lee and Gillian Roger Park, while Michael Keillor directs. Park was born on the west coast of Scotland four days after the disaster, and she told Deadline Hollywood: "The Lockerbie bombing hangs over Scottish culture very heavily. I felt the weight of that. This was a job that I really wanted to do and it’s a real honor to be asked. It's a precious story."

The series is produced by World Productions, in association with MGM Television and Night Train Media with Julia Stannard as producer.

=== Casting ===
In March 2024, Patrick J. Adams, Connor Swindells and Merritt Wever were confirmed in the lead cast as well as Eddie Marsan, Lauren Lyle, Phyllis Logan and Peter Mullan.

=== Filming ===
Principal photography started in Scotland in early 2024, with filming locations also including Malta and Toronto.

== Marketing ==
First-look images from filming and the confirmed series title, The Bombing of Pan Am 103, were provided to the media in March 2025.

== Music ==
In May 2025, the post-rock band Mogwai were revealed to have provided the series soundtrack.

== Release ==
The first episode of six-part series aired on BBC One and BBC iPlayer in the United Kingdom on 18 May 2025 before heading to Netflix globally on 30 July 2026.
