= Micki Pistorius =

South African psychologist and author

Micki Pistorius South African
- Born: Micki Pistorius; 19 March 1961 (age 65); Pretoria, South Africa
- Education: University of Pretoria
- Occupations: Psychologist; author
- Notable work: Catch Me a Killer

Micki Pistorius (born 19 March 1961) is a South African forensic or investigative psychologist and author. She was the first woman in her profession and the first profiler in South Africa, working on many high-profile cases involving serial killers for the South African Police Service in the 1990s.

She is known for her autobiography, Catch Me a Killer (2000), on which a television series of the same name was based, released in 2024.

== Early life and undergraduate education ==
Pistorius grew up in Pretoria. She studied German in school, and graduated with a BA, majoring in psychology and languages at the University of Pretoria. She studied French at university.

== Career ==
=== Journalism ===
After graduating with a BA, she worked in the Gordon Institute of Business of Science as research assistant in industrial psychology. For a period of time she also worked as a publications officer. Pistorius began working in public relations, which included writing press releases, before moving into journalism. She started a career as a journalist, which began with writing for a local newspaper in Europe. The newspaper was entitled ‘Die Translaver’Die Transvaler. She moved on to working as a radio news journalist at the South African Broadcasting Corporation (SABC) in Pretoria, which also involved some work in television.

Not too long after starting as a journalist for the SA Broadcasting Radio, she met a colleague who became her husband. When they got married, it was a mutual decision to relocate back to Cape Town. This is where she began working on a woman's magazine entitled “SARIE.”

After moving to Cape Town, she wrote for a women's magazine before being appointed to a managerial position in publications at the World Wide Fund for Nature in Stellenbosch. After leaving that job, she moved back to Pretoria and worked in public relations at Pretoria Zoo.

=== Forensic work ===
Pistorius then applied for and was accepted into the psychology honours and master's programmes at the University of Pretoria, acquiring both degrees cum laude. She entitled her Master's degree dissertation "A cross evaluation of theories regarding the Oedipus complex by example of case study." She started lecturing in psychology, earning a reputation for eccentricity.

Pistorius joined the South African Police Service (SAPS) in 1994, where she founded and headed the Investigative Psychology Unit (IPU) also known as the Investigative Psychology Section (IPS), as chief investigative psychologist.

Within two years of this appointment, she completed her D.Phil, with her thesis: "A psycho-analytical approach to serial killers". While writing her thesis on serial killers, the first in South Africa, she developed her theory linking Freudian psychosexual development with serial killing. She also compiled curricula investigative psychology courses.

By 1997, Pistorius had trained over 100 detectives to investigate serial criminals, and two successors, including Elmarie Myburgh. She said later that she was accepted by the detectives and worked very well with them, and the training developed by her was extended internationally.

Pistorius was involved in more than thirty serial killer cases while at SAPS. Among the killers whose cases she worked on are Norman Afzal Simons, Moses Sithole, David Selepe, Stewart Wilken, Sipho Thwala, Velaphi Ndlangamandla, Cedric Maake, David Mmbengwa, and Christopher Mhlengwa Zikode.

In 2000, she resigned from the police with the rank equivalent to senior superintendent, and joined a private investigation company. She sought counselling when she realised that she suffered from post-traumatic stress disorder.

==== Colleagues and the unit ====
Elmarie Myburgh, who was a founder member of the IPU/IPS, worked closely with Pistorius. She has a degree in criminology and psychology from the North-West University and a diploma in criminal justice and forensic auditing from the University of Johannesburg, and as of 2021 was the only trained profiler employed by the SAPS. As of 2022 Myburgh was still in the IPS, having been promoted to Lieutenant colonel. She is the longest-serving member of the unit, and possibly the longest-serving law-enforcement profiler. She has trained three police officers to take over when she retires in around 2031, when she turns 60.

Gérard Labuschagne, who had a PhD in clinical psychology and had formerly worked in a psychiatric hospital doing forensic assessments before joining the unit, took over from her as head of the unit, but said that he had much to learn from then Captains Elmarie Myburgh and Lynne Evans in IPU. He wrote a book, The Profiler Diaries (2020), about some of the cases he worked on.

=== Writing ===
A UK publisher invited her to write an autobiography, which became her international bestselling book Catch Me a Killer (2000), after Penguin South Africa bought the manuscript and published it.

While working for the private firm, Pistorius wrote Strangers in the Street: Historical overview of SA serial killers (2002) again published by Penguin SA, which then commissioned her to write Fatal Females (2004), which described the crimes of 51 female perpetrators. In the same year, she published an historical novel, Sorg. Profiling serial killers and other crimes followed in 2005. The Afrikaans translation of Catch Me a Killer, Skimme in die Skadu, was published in 2006.

=== Television ===
Pistorius then joined the TV production company Zyron (owned by actress Sandra Prinsloo and producer Jan Groenewalt), and wrote scripts and co-presented two crime documentary series. She also featured in a number of local and international crime documentaries, including by the SABC, M-Net, KykNET, BBC, and others. Canal Plus in France aired a documentary Micki et le vent noir (Micki and the Black Wind) about her career as a profiler, and several international magazines, including Paris Match, featured articles about her.

An 11-part true crime television series, called Catch Me a Killer and based on her autobiography of the same name, was released by Showmax in early 2024. Lead writer on the series was Amy Jephta, and Charlotte Hope stars as Pistorius. The series was co-produced by the German production company Night Train Media, along with CMak (UK) and M-Net (SA). Pistorius was a consultant on the series, and also provided emotional support to Hope during filming. The series is directed by Tracey Larcombe.

=== Later activities ===
Pistorius opened a private practice as psychologist and consultant and wrote a few in-house pieces before making another turn in her career. Her in-house pieces highlighted many psychological topics such as stress management, child disciple, neuro-psychology, and communication styles. In 2010 she enrolled for an honours degree in Biblical archaeology. She completed the degree within a year after researching and submitting 15 articles.

Also in 2010, she gave expert advice as a clinical psychologist in a court case involving a woman who had committed sexual abuse on children under the influence of her controlling lover. As of 2013 she was still consulting for South African government agencies.

In 2015, she developed an interactive website, called Heroes, a psychological insight into men's perceptions on relationships, after interviewing many men about their views on love, sex, marriage, divorce, and platonic relationships. In this work, she uses Greek mythology metaphorically and uses case studies to illustrate themes.

On 9 February 2024, Pistorius launched her own YouTube Channel, "Micki Pistorius Profiler on Record".

== Attributes and skills ==
Pistorius was the first woman in her profession and the first profiler in South Africa.

She is recognised as one of the world's foremost psychological profilers by people such as FBI profiler Robert Ressler, from whom she had obtained training, along with Roy Hazelwood, in Dundee, Scotland.

In her memoir, Pistorius wrote that she has "cryptesthesia", a form of extra-sensory perception. She has also said that she has empathy for serial killers, who she says are "not monsters; they are human beings with tortured souls. I will never condone what they do, but I can understand them."

== Personal life ==
Pistorius is the aunt of Paralympic champion athlete and convicted murderer Oscar Pistorius.

As of February 2024, Pistorius lives on the island of Mauritius, where she practises general and neuropsychology, occasionally consults for the legal profession as a forensic psychologist, and presents courses to companies on coaching managers and executives about emotional intelligence for managers, workplace security, and emotional safety at work. She has also lectured at the Open University of Mauritius and Middlesex University Mauritius, and in 2023 delivered a presentation on forensic psychology at the Office of the Director of Public Prosecutions.

She has a passion for archaeology, and says that she has found peace on Mauritius.

== Selected works ==
- Catch me a killer (Penguin, 2000) ISBN 0-14-029722-7
- Strangers on the street (Penguin, 2002) ISBN 0-14-100356-1
- Fatal Females (Penguin, 2004) ISBN 0-14-302440-X
- Profiling Serial Killers and other crimes in South Africa (Penguin, 2005) ISBN 0-14-302482-5
- Skimme in Die Skadu (Penguin, 2006) ISBN 978-0-14-302517-7
- Sorg (Penguin, 2012) ISBN 978-0-14-352715-2 (historical novel)
