= Safe Harbor (2025 TV series) =

2025 crime drama television series

- Created by: Mark Williams
- Screenplay by: Mark Williams
- Directed by: Mark Williams; Arne Toonen; Inti Calfat; Dirk Verheye
- Starring: Martijn Lakemeier; Charlie Murphy; Alfie Allen; Jack Gleeson
- Countries of origin: Netherlands; Belgium
- Original languages: English, Dutch
- No. of series: 1
- No. of episodes: 8

Production
- Executive producers: Mark Williams; Adam Barth; James Copp; Herbert L. Kloiber; Femke Wolting
- Cinematography: Wim Vanswijgenhoven
- Production companies: Submarine; Night Train Media

Original release
- Network: Videoland (Netherlands); Streamz (Belgium)
- Release: 10 January 2025 (Netherlands)

Safe Harbor is a crime drama television series from Mark Williams, starring Martijn Lakemeier, Charlie Murphy, Alfie Allen, and Jack Gleeson.

== Premise ==
Tobias (Allen) and Marco (Lakemeier) are hackers who become involved with organised crime when they cross paths with members of the Irish mob, Sloane (Murphy) and her brother Farrell (Gleeson). They employ them to hack into the security system of Europe's largest shipping port, in Rotterdam, to enable undetected deliveries of drug shipments.

== Cast ==
- Martijn Lakemeier as Marco de Bont
- Charlie Murphy as Sloane Walsh
- Alfie Allen as Tobias Chapman
- Jack Gleeson as Farrell Walsh
- Colm Meaney as Kieran Walsh
- Gaite Jansen as Rika Rogers
- Ian Lloyd Anderson as Mr. O'Brien
- Pauline McLynn as Brina Walsh
- Charlotte Timmers as Jolie

== Production ==
=== Development ===
Mark Williams is producing with Femke Wolting from Dutch company Submarine and Germany company Night Train Media on the project. Dutch streamer Videoland is the anchor commissioner.

=== Filming ===
Filming begun in Rotterdam in 2023, with filming scheduled for early 2024 in Belgium and Ireland. Mark Williams is directing along with Arne Toonen, Inti Calfat and Dirk Verheye.

=== Casting ===
In November 2023, Charlie Murphy, Alfie Allen, Jack Gleeson and Martijn Lakemeier were cast in lead roles.

== Release ==
Safe Harbor premiered in the Netherlands on 10 January 2025. It premiered in Ireland on Virgin Media One on 6 April and in the UK on the ITVX streaming service on 20 April 2025.
