= Skins Rise =

- Skins episodes
- Episode nos.: Series 7 Episodes 5–6
- Directed by: Jack Clough
- Written by: Jamie Brittain
- Original air dates: 29 July 2013 (7.05); 5 August 2013 (7.06)

Guest appearances
- Liam Boyle as Louie; Lucien Laviscount as Jason; Esther Smith as Emma; Hannah Britland as Charlie

Episode chronology
← Previous "Skins Pure"	Next → —

"Skins Rise" is a feature-length episode of the E4 television series Skins. Airing in two parts in 2013, the episode was the third and final episode of the specially-commissioned seventh season intended to bring the series to a close, and the final episode of the series. While in its initial six-year run Skins was a teen drama about the lives of Bristolian teenagers, "Skins Rise" like the two previous episodes, "Skins Fire" and "Skins Pure", is a filmically and tonally distinct drama which revisits one of the show's characters as they face adulthood.

"Skins Rise" focuses on the character of James Cook (Jack O'Connell).

Once a hedonistic womaniser and troublemaker in the third and fourth series of Skins, Cook was last seen fighting his friend Freddie's murderer, the outcome of which was left as a cliff-hanger.

In the present day, Cook is living in Manchester, remaining under the radar from the authorities and society at large. However, he is noticeably more subdued and serious, clearly harrowed by the events of his past and he makes his living peddling drugs in Manchester’s criminal underworld.

== Synopsis ==
=== Part 1 ===
Cook, now aged 21, is living in Manchester, and works as a drug peddler for Louie, a wealthy nightclub owner and drug baron, along with Louie's other employee, Jason, and his bodyguard, Rob. Having spent years on the run after killing John Foster, his friend Freddie's murderer, Cook sleeps in his car, and routinely has sex with Emma, his friend-with-benefits. He is called to Louie's flat where Louie asks him to drive his girlfriend, Charlie, house hunting. Charlie jumps into the swimming pool of a house they inspect, but Cook refuses to join. Charlie frustratedly questions his behaviour. As he continues to drive Charlie around, however, she flirts with him more, and continues to press him to reveal more details of his past to her, but he refuses. She later requests him to drop her off at a housing development and not disclose this to Louie. He discusses this with Jason, who appears likewise confused.

Louie throws a party and Cook attends with Emma. After consuming a pill given to Emma by Jason, Cook spots Charlie dancing in the crowd. Perplexed, he breaks away from Emma and walks away from the scene. Cook exits the venue throwing up and comes across Jason having sex with Charlie. Jason violently beats Cook up, and threatens him to keep quiet. Emma finds Cook in a state, and takes him back to her flat to clean him up. While there, they discuss the possibility of packing up and leaving Manchester for good. Cook receives a call for Charlie and subsequently leaves to meet her. Charlie demands he tell her what has happened to him, and he admits that he has killed someone. They then proceed to have sex but are interrupted by Louie calling Cook, telling him to bring Charlie to their new house for a house warming party. As Cook, Rob, Jason, Charlie and Louie talk at the house, Louie reveals that he knows that Charlie has been cheating on him. He states he is planning to "streamline" his operation and Rob brutally drowns Jason in the swimming pool. Charlie watches in horrified silence and is then led to another room by Louie. Horrified, Cook goes to Emma's and tells her to pack. As they are driving out of Manchester, Cook gets a call from a traumatised Charlie, who begs him to pick her up from the nearby bus station. He turns his car around against Emma's wishes.

=== Part 2 ===
Cook, Emma and Charlie flee Manchester, to a country manor owned by Emma's parents in the Midlands. They get in with the spare key, but are confronted by Emma's parents who have not seen her in two years. They are allowed to stay. Emma realises Charlie has had sex with Cook, and confronts him. Cook apologises and initiates sex with her but she leaves. The next day, Cook causes a scene at their local pub. Louie is at the manor when they return, having tracked Cook's car electronically. He tries to persuade Charlie to come home with him, but she coldly refuses. Seemingly dejected, he leaves, as do Emma's parents. Cook instructs the girls to pack up and they leave by foot.

Cook, Emma and Charlie find Emma's parent's car pushed off the road. It is empty of Emma's parents and her father's shotgun. Cook realises that Louie has taken it, and they run into the woods, Emma hysterical. Cook explores the woods and hears two gun shots near Louie's car. He flees and the three find an abandoned wooden bunker for shelter. Charlie gives Emma sedatives to calm her. As they wait for morning, Charlie resolves to kill Louie but Cook refuses. Charlie urges him to choose her over Emma, and they kiss. Unbeknownst to them, Emma wakes up and sees them.

Cook wakes up and discovers that Emma has left. Cook and Charlie's search leads them to an empty field where Louie is waiting for them with a gun, with Emma's dead body hanging by a noose from a nearby tree. Charlie remains in the woods while Cook confronts Louie. Cook provokes Louie by revealing he had sex with Charlie and they attack each other. Cook knocks Louie unconscious. He picks the gun up and fires into the air.

Later, Cook rouses Louie and informs him that the police are on their way. Charlie is in Louie's car and Cook tells her to disappear. He says they will never see each other again and she drives away. Cook crouches over Emma's body mournfully, then walks off into the distance.

== Reception ==
Part 1 received favourable reviews, with Caroline Preece of Den of Geek commenting that "those who loved the character are still going to find Rise a compelling watch. It’s grim, but in an entirely different way to Effy or Cassie’s stories, and it somehow makes perfect sense to find him in this heightened world a million miles away from the ordinary world of Skins." Morgan Jeffrey of Digital Spy, meanwhile, noted that the episode "thrills in a way that its predecessors didn't - it's plenty dark in places, but also engaging and outlandish in all the ways that classic Skins was." James T. Cornish of WhatCulture praised Liam Boyle's performance, describing him as "a decent villain" and that Boyle "really helps to flesh out the character and make him feel like a potent threat."
