= The East (2020 film) =

- Poster
- Dutch: De Oost
- Directed by: Jim Taihuttu
- Written by: Mustafa Duygulu; Jim Taihuttu
- Produced by: Sander Verdonk; Julius Ponten
- Starring: Martijn Lakemeier; Marwan Kenzari
- Cinematography: Lennart Verstegen
- Edited by: Mieneke Kramer
- Music by: Gino Taihuttu
- Production companies: New Amsterdam Film Company; Salto Films; Wrong Men North; France 2 Cinema; Moonkey
- Distributed by: Amazon Prime Video (International); Splendid Film (Netherlands)
- Release date: 25 September 2020 (Netherlands); 7 August 2021 (Indonesia)
- Running time: 137 minutes
- Countries: Netherlands; Belgium; Indonesia; France; United States
- Languages: Dutch; Indonesian
- Budget: €6.6 million
- Box office: $160,007

The East (Dutch: De Oost) is a 2020 Dutch war film directed by Jim Taihuttu.

== Plot ==
The film is set in the Dutch East Indies of 1946 during the Indonesian National Revolution. Twenty-year-old soldier Johan de Vries from Arcen is sent to Semarang, where the Dutch army says it is to liberate the Indonesian people from the authority of Sukarno. Johan believes in the promise to help the population, but soon discovers that the reality is different: he notices that the population is hostile to the Dutch army and that his colleagues in turn hardly act against war crimes. For example, the army takes no action when the chiefs of a nearby village are found beheaded. Johan's fellow soldiers are instead more concerned with visiting local brothels and refer to the population as 'monkeys'.

After three months, during a patrol, the corps is suddenly attacked by Indonesian guerrillas, in which soldier Werner is killed. Army captain Raymond Westerling, who leads counter-guerrilla actions and purges against the Indonesian revolutionaries, tracks down the man who shot Werner and involves Johan in torturing the man. Johan then accompanies Westerling on a perilous journey deep into enemy territory to take out guerrilla fighters, making his first victim in the process.

Westerling admits Johan to his secret mission and carries out various assignments. Not much later, Johan is promoted to corporal. He hardens and the corps becomes increasingly alienated from him: his comrade Mattias Cohen is startled when Johan shoots a guerrilla fighter in cold blood. Meanwhile, rumors are spread about Johan's family in the camp. He told the soldiers himself that his entire family had died, but in reality his father is serving a prison sentence in Vught because he was a prominent member of the National Socialist Movement during World War II who was responsible for the deaths of more than a thousand Jews.

Johan and some fellow soldiers accompany Westerling on a dangerous purge mission to South Sulawesi. Led by Westerling, the army kills suspected guerrillas and innocent civilians are also victims of his violent regime. It bothers Johan that the suspects are convicted and killed without any trial. Gradually, Johan starts to question the war more and more.

In one of the settlements, a suspect claims to be innocent and to have been framed. Johan pleads to find out before the man is convicted, which Westerling interprets as insubordination and treason. He then declares Johan an outlaw and orders the corps to shoot him. Johan flees into the jungle and kills soldier Eddy Coolen. To his great surprise, Mattias also turned against him. After a confrontation with Westerling, Johan finally manages to escape with a gunshot wound.

Once in the Netherlands, Johan is unable to pick up his old life. He cannot find a job and struggles with hatred towards his father. Years later, he visits Westerling in a theater where he works as an actor. Johan shoots him in the stomach and then commits suicide.

== Cast ==
- Martijn Lakemeier as Johan de Vries
- Marwan Kenzari as Raymond Westerling
- Jonas Smulders as Mattias Cohen
- Joes Brauers as Herman Keizer
- Huub Smit as Lieutenant Hartman
- Jeroen Perceval as Chaplain Janssen
- Peter Paul Muller as Major Penders
- Jim Deddes as Werner de Val
- Reinout Scholten van Aschat as Tinus de Val
- David Wristers as Marcus Waterman
- Abel van Gijlswijk as Sjaak 'Charlie' Rondhuis
- Coen Bril as Eddy Coolen
- Mike Reus as Camp Commander Mulder
- Joenoes Polnaija as Samuel Manuhio
- Denise Aznam as Gita Tamim
- Putri Ayudya as Myra
- Lukman Sardi as Bakar

== Production ==
Director Jim Taihuttu had been developing a film project about a "black page of Dutch history" since 2012. Producer Sander Verdonk joined the film in 2015 and from then on started looking for financiers.

In writing the screenplay, the Royal Netherlands Institute of Southeast Asian and Caribbean Studies were consulted for historical facts, and a conscious effort was made to find a co-production partner in Indonesia. Verdonk told us about the reasons behind this: "For us such a cooperation was very important. We didn't want to settle down there like some kind of neo-colonist and make a little film. A large part of the crew was Indonesian."

The filming period started in February 2019 in Indonesia, ultimately filming for 48 days in Indonesia, with six additional filming days in the Netherlands.

== Release ==
First footage of the film was released in May 2020, premiering at the Netherlands Film Festival on 25 September 2020. The film was originally scheduled for theatrical release on 10 September 2020, but due to delays incurred by COVID-19, the release was postponed until 13 May 2021, alongside a release on Amazon Prime Video.

Prior to release, the filmmakers developed a teaching package with film fragments for schools, with the aim of turning the Indonesian War of Independence, which had hardly been discussed in schools until then, into teaching material. Producer New Amsterdam intended to set up a major information campaign about the Indonesian War of Independence in collaboration with, among others, the East West Foundation and the Indies Remembrance Center.

The film came under scrutiny in September 2020 when the Moluccan diaspora interest group Maluku4Maluku, veterans' rights advocacy group Veterans Platform, and the Federation of Dutch Indos publicly condemned the trailer of the film. The organizations accused the filmmakers of 'historical inaccuracies' and made a critical comparison between the Dutch soldiers in The East with the military of Nazi Germany. Examples were the historically incorrect black uniforms worn by the actors, reminiscent of those worn by the Schutzstaffel, the 'Hitler mustache' of the film's Raymond Westerling, and the use of the blackletter typeface, commonly associated with German publications. In reality, Dutch troops wore standard light uniforms and Westerling did not have a mustache. Maluku4Maluku frontman Leo Reawaruw demanded a preview of the film on behalf of stakeholders, but this request was not granted. Producer Sander Verdonk commented: "This history is complex and traumatic for some, we want to show that. It would be a shame if the discussion about the war of independence now mainly focuses on a mustache and uniforms. We will not make any substantive changes to the film."

Due to the continuing angry response from Dutch veterans, Indos, and Moluccans, it was announced in December 2020 that the film was to receive a disclaimer, which would make it clear that the film is an interpretation of the producer and director and not based on truth. The Federation of Dutch Indos added that the film gives an "incorrect and one-sided picture of the situation in the Dutch East Indies". Verdonk then announced that a disclaimer would not be published.

== Reception ==
Critic Gudo Tienhooven of the Algemeen Dagblad awarded the film four stars: "The cinematic class certainly drips from it, the atmosphere is sultry and the acting is sublime. But it is certainly not a masterpiece. (...) At least it's finally here: cinema about this hyper-sensitive piece of history. The East is actually a three-star film, but gets an extra star for the guts."

De Volkskrant reviewer Berend Jan Bockting also gave the film four out of five stars: "Taihuttu shows in great detail how moral awareness can evaporate under specific circumstances, how thoughts about good and evil can be suppressed in favor of war logic. That is not to say that The East can be seen as a reckoning with the Dutch war veterans stationed in the Dutch East Indies, as was feared here and there. On the contrary, it is precisely the soldier's lives that are viewed with a loving eye for detail. (...) The story-transcending, dialogue-free montages of the soldiers on patrol, supported by dreamy music. At those moments, The East is almost a fever dream."

Critic Remke de Lange of Trouw gave the film three out of five stars: "The structure of the screenplay by Taihuttu and Mustafa Duygulu is solid. (...) At the same time, the dialogues are pushy and heavy; like haughty kaaskoppen, the soldiers invariably talk about pinda's and 'monkeys'. That is an easy way to score with a woke audience and does not make the characters more interesting. (...) The fuss about the film indicates social hypersensitivity that Taihuttu rightly ignores. Kenzari's role as a mysterious, eloquent leader who brings horror to others makes The East's release – as a starting point for discussion – commendable."

RogerEbert.com reviewer Simon Abrams awarded the film two stars, comparing the film unfavourably to the Vietnam War film Apocalypse Now. Abrams criticised Taihuttu and Duygulu for indulging in the "chauvinistic mentality" of the main protagonist Johan Jr. and presenting the Indonesian natives as "meek victims." Abrams described the first half of the film as a "Coppola/Herzog-style fever dream" where the conflicted protagonist is exposed to the limits of their perspective but opined that the second half of the film failed to build on this narrative flow.
