= Martijn Lakemeier =

Dutch film and television actor

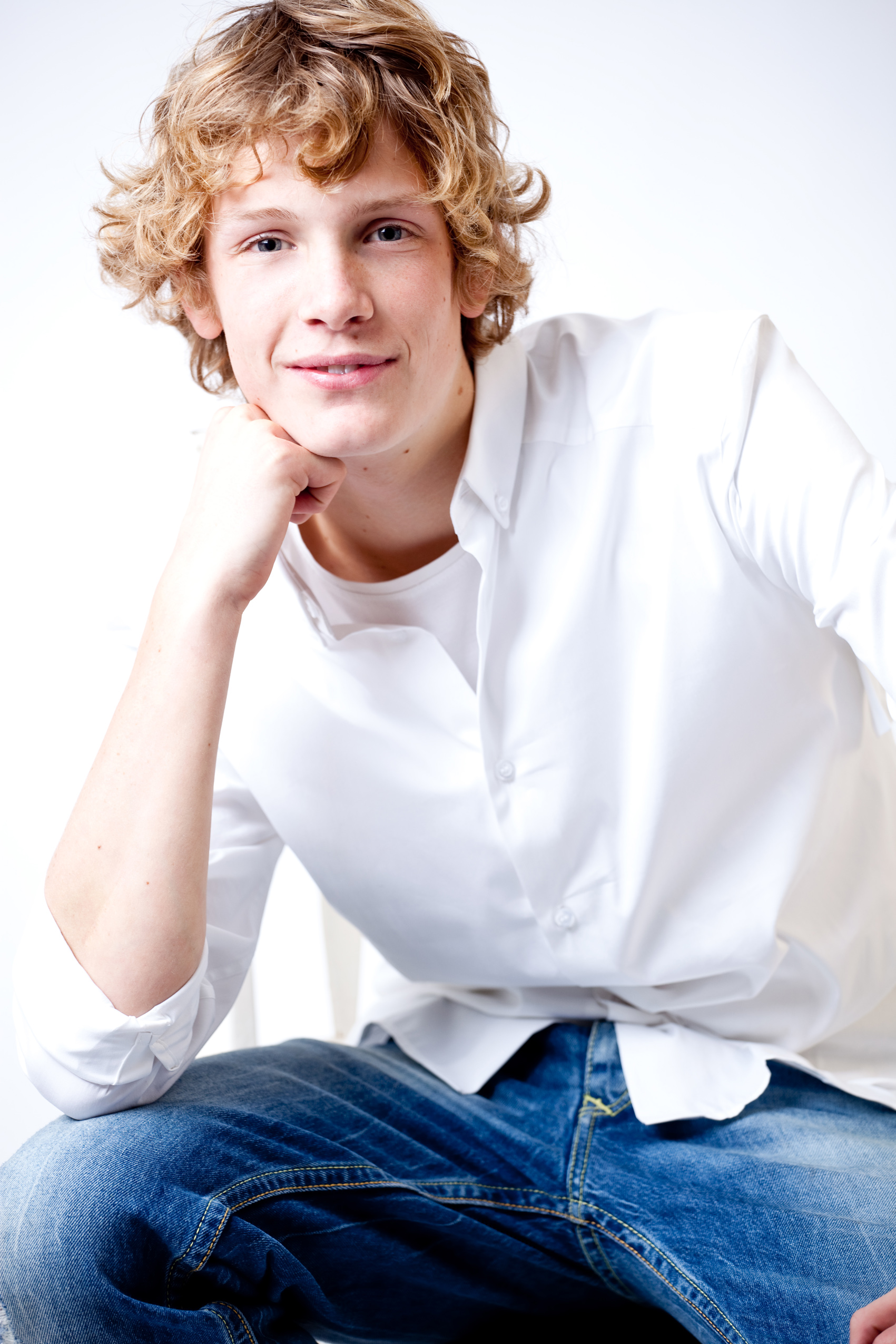
- Martijn Lakemeier
- Born: 17 September 1993 (age 32); Zwijndrecht, Netherlands
- Occupation: Actor
- Years active: 2008–present

Martijn Lakemeier (born 17 September 1993 in Zwijndrecht) is a Dutch actor.

== Career ==
He is best known for his performance as Michiel in Winter in Wartime for which he won several awards including the Golden Calf for Best Actor (2009). He is the youngest winner of a Golden Calf for Best Actor to date.

He played roles in several Dutch films and TV series, such as De Marathon (2012), The Secrets of Barslet (2012), It's All So Quiet (2013), Ventoux (2015) and Yes I do (2015). On TV he can be seen in the series Dutch Hope (2014), which won the Golden Calf for Best TV series.

Lakemeier studied acting at the Maastricht Academy of Dramatic Arts.

Lakemeier starred as Johan, a young Dutch soldier in the 2020 film De Oost. His character Johan served under the controversial Royal Netherlands East Indies Army (KNIL) officer Raymond Westerling in South Sulawesi during the Indonesian National Revolution.

Lakemeier stars in television series Safe Harbor from Ozark co-creator Mark Williams alongside a cast including Alfie Allen and Jack Gleeson. The eight-part series is based around cyber crime.

== Filmography ==
- Winter in Wartime (2008)
- Lover Of Loser (2009)
- De Marathon (2012)
- Boven is het stil / It's All So Quiet (2013)
- Adios Amigos (2016)
- De Oost (2020)
- Happy Ending (2023)
- Máxima (2024)
- Safe Harbour 2025
- Marie Antoinette (2022-2025)
