= June Drummond =

South African author (1923–2011)

- Born: 15 November 1923; Durban, South Africa
- Died: 3 June 2011 (aged 87); Durban
- Education: Durban Girls' College; University of Cape Town, B.A. 1944
- Occupation: Mystery writer
- Parent(s): John and Florence (Green) Drummond

June Drummond (15 November 1923 – 3 June 2011) was a South African writer of mysteries. Thirty of her crime novels, often set in Durban, South Africa, or London, England, were published between 1959 and 2011.

== Education and career ==
Born in Durban, South Africa, Drummond attended Durban Girls' College, a boarding school where she was dux (the leading student). After graduating from the University of Cape Town (B.A. 1944), Drummond wrote for Woman's Weekly and for the Natal Mercury from 1946 through 1948. From 1948 through 1950, she worked as a secretary in London, England, and from then until 1953 as a secretary with the Durban Civic Orchestra in South Africa. Returning to London, she served as assistant secretary of the Church Adoption Society from 1954 through 1960, the year she became a full-time writer. In addition to writing, she served as chair of the Durban adoption committee of the Indian Child Welfare Society from 1963 through 1974. She died in Durban in 2011.

== Critical reception ==
Drummond "is a skillful writer who handles prose well", says Carol Simpson Stern in St. James Guide to Crime and Mystery. Her novels, set in London, Durban, or imaginary places, range from Junta, a political novel about apartheid, to a series of novels such as The People in Glass House that seem descended from Gothic horror stories. They may involve "...half-mad women, mistaken identities, bitter rivalries among kin, men of raffish ways, and women moon-goddesses who destroy those near them...". Less pleasing to Stern in some of Drummond's work are what she regards as thinly developed characters, stock situations, and a tendency to moralize.

Publishers Weekly says The Imposter, a Drummond novel set in 19th-century London, "has the razzle-dazzle plotting of a good mystery and the taut pacing of a good thriller". The reviewer likes Drummond's "crisp dialogue" and her eye for accurate historic detail and credits her with producing a "top-drawer romance, wholly engaging and perfectly entertaining."

== Bibliography ==
- The Black Unicorn (1959)
- Thursday's Child (1961)
- A Time to Speak (1962)
- A Cage of Humming-Birds (1964)
- Welcome, Proud Lady (1964)
- Cable Car (1965)
- The Saboteurs (1967)
- Murder on a Bad Trip (1968); published in England as The Gantry Episode (1968)
- The People in Glass House (1969)
- Farewell Party (1971)
- Bang! Bang! You're Dead (1973)
- The Boon Companions (1974); published in the United States as Drop Dead (1976)
- Slowly the Poison (1975)
- Funeral Urn (1976)
- The Patriots (1979)
- I Saw Him Die (1979)
- Such a Nice Family (1980)
- The Trojan Mule (1982)
- The Bluestocking (1985)
- Junta (1989)
- The Unsuitable Miss Pelham (1990)
- Burden of Guilt (1991)
- The Impostor (1992)
- Hidden Agenda (1993)
- Loose Cannon (2004)
- The Meddlers (2004)
- Old Bones Buried Under (2006)
- Countdown Murder (2008)
- Dead Shot (2011)
