= Sarah Pudifin-Jones =

- Born: Sarah Farley Pudifin; 1984/1985
- Education: University of KwaZulu-Natal; Gonville and Caius College, Cambridge
- Spouse: Matthew Jones
- Children: 3

Sarah Farley Pudifin-Jones (born 1984/1985) is a South African advocate, legal academic, and musician.

== Early life and education ==
Pudifin-Jones is the daughter of immunologist and clarinet player Dennis James Pudifin (d. 2013) and Jennifer Riseborough. Pudifin-Jones attended Durban Girls' College. She began playing violin at age four and would later perform with the KZN Philharmonic Orchestra, the KwaZulu-Natal Youth Orchestra, Durban City Orchestra, and the South African National Youth Orchestra. She became a leader of the KZNYO and concert master of the SANYO and DCO. In a 2016 News24 article, Pudifin-Jones said "I think law, music and art are the perfect combination. They both require an analytical mind and attention to detail, but also need creativity and dedication".

In 2007, Pudifin-Jones graduated summa cum laude from the University of KwaZulu-Natal with a Bachelor of Laws (LLB) in Law, Philosophy and Economics. In 2008, she was a Law Clerk to Justice Albie Sachs. Pudifin-Jones went on to pursue a Master of Laws (LLB) and a Master of Philosophy (MPhil) at Gonville and Caius College, Cambridge, studying Law and Criminology on an Emma Smith scholarship.

== Career ==
Upon returning to South Africa after completing her studies at Cambridge, Pudifin-Jones became a Contract Lecturer and Honorary Research Fellow at her alma mater the University of KwaZulu-Natal. In 2011, she was called to the KwaZulu-Natal Bar, where she is currently a member of Ubunye Chambers in Umhlanga, and became an Advocate of the High Court of South Africa. Pudifin-Jones appeared on the Mail & Guardian's 2014 list of 200 Young South Africans.

In January 2024, Pudifin-Jones appeared in the Hague as a member of the legal team representing South Africa's proceedings accusing Israel of genocide at the International Court of Justice (ICJ).

== Personal life ==
Pudifin-Jones is married to Matthew Jones, who competed on The Great South African Bake Off in 2016, and has three sons. They are practicing Anglicans.

== Bibliography ==
- Class Action Litigation in South Africa (2017), editor with various
