= Mark O'Connell (writer) =

Irish author and journalist (born 1979)

- Born: 23 June 1979 (age 47); Kilkenny, Ireland
- Education: Trinity College Dublin
- Occupations: Author and journalist
- Notable work: To Be a Machine (2017)
- Awards: Rooney Prize for Irish Literature; Wellcome Book Prize
- Website: mark-oconnell.com

Mark O'Connell (born 23 June 1979) is an Irish author and journalist. His debut book, To Be a Machine, was published in 2017, followed in 2020 by Notes from an Apocalypse. His third book, A Thread of Violence, was published in 2023.

He has written for publications including The New Yorker, The New York Times Magazine, The New York Review of Books, and The Guardian.

He is also the author of the Kindle Single Epic Fail: Bad Art, Viral Fame, and the History of the Worst Thing Ever (Byliner/The Millions), as well as an academic study of the novels of John Banville.

== Education and personal life ==
O'Connell was born in Kilkenny, Ireland, in 1979, and grew up there. His father worked as a pharmacist. O'Connell has an older brother and a younger sister. He was educated at Kilkenny College and studied English at Trinity College Dublin (TCD), where he completed a PhD on the novels of John Banville, graduating in 2011. He lives in Dublin.

== Major works ==
In 2017, O'Connell published To Be a Machine. Described by The New York Times Book Review as "a gonzo-journalistic exploration of the Silicon Valley techno-utopians' pursuit of escaping mortality", it is an investigation of transhumanism. It was the winner of the 2018 Wellcome Book Prize, and the Rooney Prize in 2019.

O'Connell's second book, published in 2020, is Notes from an Apocalypse. A book about apocalyptic anxieties, it was described by Esquire as "deeply funny and life-affirming, with a warm, generous outlook even on the most challenging of subjects."

His third book, A Thread of Violence, about the Irish murderer Malcolm Macarthur, was published in 2023.

Essays

O'Connell has written essays for The New York Times Magazine on the subjects of pessimism and parenthood, and the TV show Game of Thrones, and for The Guardian on turning 40, and the benefits of isolation. He is also an opinion columnist for The Irish Times.

== Awards ==
O'Connell has been awarded the Wellcome Book Prize and the Rooney Prize for Irish Literature. His debut book, To Be a Machine, was a finalist for the 2017 Royal Society Insight Investment Science Book Prize and was shortlisted for the 2017 Baillie Gifford Prize.

== Adaptations ==
In 2020, it was announced that a theatrical adaptation of To Be a Machine was to be performed as part of the Dublin Theatre Festival. Titled To Be a Machine (Version 1.0), the adaptation by theatre company Dead Centre saw O'Connell's character played by Jack Gleeson. Owing to the COVID-19 pandemic, the performance was online only.

== Bibliography ==
=== Book ===
- To Be a Machine: Adventures Among Cyborgs, Utopians, Hackers, and the Futurists Solving the Modest Problem of Death. Granta Books. 2017. ISBN 9781783781973.
- Notes from an Apocalypse: A Personal Journey to the End of the World and Back (hardcover 1st ed.). London: Granta Books. 2020. ISBN 9781783784066.
- A Thread of Violence: A Story of Truth, Invention, and Murder. Doubleday. 2023. ISBN 9780385547628.

=== Short work ===
- "Story time : Cartoon Saloon offers a different vision for children's entertainment". Onward and Upward with the Arts. The New Yorker. 96 (41): 26–30. 21 December 2020. (Note: Online version is titled "Cartoon Saloon and the new Golden Age of animation".)
- Mark O'Connell, "The War App" (review of Alexander C. Karp and Nicholas W. Zamiska, The Technological Republic: Hard Power, Soft Belief, and the Future of the West, Crown Currency, 2025, 295 pp.), The New York Review of Books, vol. LXXII, no. 14 (25 September 2025), pp. 18, 20, 22. Mark O'Connell writes that Alexander Karp's attempt "to present himself as an unconventional thinker ... is ultimately in service of a consolidation of state power and business interests – what is normally referred to as the military-industrial complex, which since the end of World War II has been at the root of many long and brutal foreign conflicts, as well as the fortunes of many ruthless and clever opportunists." (p. 22.)
