= Destiny (magazine) =

Women's magazine in South Africa (2007–2019)

- Khanyi Dhlomo on the 1st anniversary edition of Destiny Magazine
- Editor: Khanyi Dhlomo (Founding Editor); Ingrid Wood; Sheena Adams
- Categories: Business, fashion, lifestyle
- Frequency: Monthly
- Circulation: 31, 091 (2014)
- Publisher: Media24
- First issue: 8 October 2007
- Final issue: January 2019
- Company: Ndalo Media
- Country: South Africa
- Language: English
- Website: www.destinyconnect.com

Destiny is or was a monthly high-end business, women's fashion magazine published in South Africa.

== History ==
Ndalo Media was a pioneering print and digital media company that owned and published Destiny and Destiny Man magazines. It was founded by Khanyi Dhlomo in partnership with Media24 (under Naspers) and published the first issue of Destiny in October 2007. The magazine ran until January 2019 when Dhlomo shut Ndalo Media down amidst claims of financial distress.

It was published in South Africa by Ndalo Media before the publishing company was shut down in January 2019.

A magazine subscription website offers subscription and shows an August 2020 issue. A website called "Destinyconnect" describes itself as "the quintessential businesswoman's journal for content that ensures that all her business, career and lifestyle needs are sufficiently and satisfyingly met", owned by The Bar Group.

== Target audience ==
Destiny was aimed at women who either aspired to be or were actively engaged in business and who were 25–55 years old. The magazine combined business news (South African and global) with fashion, beauty, lifestyle, entertainment, health, travel and inspirational content.

== Power of 40 ==
Destiny used to issue an annual list of 40 women called "The Power of 40", in which they selected "40 remarkable women under the age of 40 all making their mark in their respective fields", called . Women so listed have included playwright and screenwriter Amy Jephta.

== Destiny Man ==
Destiny Man was an bimonthly publication aimed at stylish and affluent South African men. It was the brother publication to Destiny, of which first issue appeared in July 2009, followed by its online extension in the same month.

== See also ==
- Khanyi Dhlomo
- Kojo Baffoe
