= Frank Baffoe =

Ghanaian economist, diplomat and businessman

- Born: Frank Baffoe; 3 February 1935; Nkoranza, Gold Coast
- Died: 13 December 2016 (aged 81); Jesse Hospital, Maputsoe, Lesotho
- Occupation: Academic
- Children: Kojo Baffoe; Efua Baffoe; Kweku Baffoe; Kobina Baffoe

Academic background
- Education: University of Hamburg; LMU Munich; Knightsbridge University

Frank Baffoe was a Ghanaian economist, diplomat and businessman. He was Ghana's honorary consul to Lesotho until his death in 2016.

== Early life and education ==
Baffoe was born on 3 February 1935 at Nkoranza in the Gold Coast (now Ghana). His formal education begun at Government Senior Boys' School, Accra, where he completed his primary education in 1950. He enrolled in the Accra Academy that same year for his secondary education, graduating in 1952. After his secondary education, he had a Correspondence Course with Wolsey Hall College, England from 1958 to 1960. In 1964, he gained admission to study at the University of Hamburg, Germany (then West Germany). He studied there for two years and moved to LMU Munich, Germany (then West Germany), where he graduated in 1970 with a master's degree in economics. He obtained his doctorate (PhD) degree in Business Administration from Knightsbridge University, London.

== Career ==
Baffoe begun as an apprentice in printing and photo engraving at Government Press, Accra, from 1953 to 1956. From 1956 to 1958, he was made a technician for the same company. In 1958, he was employed by Guinea Press, Accra, where he was made assistant chief engraver. He worked at Guinea Press for two years.

After his tertiary education, he became a junior economic research officer at the IFO Institute for Economic Research in Munich. Two years later, he became a research fellow at Makerere University, Kampala and the lecturer for Economic Theory in 1973. He was appointed senior lecturer of Economics at the National University of Lesotho in 1975. Between 1975 and 1985, he was a Senior Lecturer at the University of Botswana, Lesotho and Swaziland (UBLS), University of Swaziland, and the National University of Lesotho.

Baffoe was a member of the Makerere Institute of Social Research, a member of the executive committee of the Research Committee and Library Committee, a member of the East African Agricultural Economic Society, an examiner for the East African Examinations Council for A-Level Economics, youth representative for the Society for International Development from 1971 to 1972, a member of the Eastern African Agricultural Economics Society in 1974, and a member of the African Association for Public Administration and Management in 1975.

== Business and other engagements ==
In 1985, Baffoe left academia to venture business. He established five family legally incorporated private companies and served as chairman and Chief Executive for all the companies. He was also served as chairman and Shareholder of BR Mining Africa, which was incorporated in Ghana in 2012. Under the Public Private Partnership Model, he was a Facilitator of Finance and Technology for African Governments. He was a member of the Board of Directors of the Central Bank of Lesotho, Maluti Mountain Brewery, Lesotho Tourism Development Corporation and the Lesotho Land and Housing Development Corporation. In government, he worked as an Advisor to various Ministries of various governments of Lesotho in the fields of Finance, Trade and Industry, Agriculture and Rural Development. From 1998 to 2005, he was a member and Chairman of the Government of Lesotho Mine Negotiation Team. He was also a member and Charter Member of Rotary Club of Maloti, Maseru, and the District Governor of Rotary International from 2010 to 2011. He was also the Area Coordinator of the Rotary District 9370 until his death in 2016. Baffoe served as Ghana's Honorary Consul until his death in 2016. He was succeeded by Dr. Yaw Nyameche Gyasi-Agei.

== Publications ==
Baffoe published many research papers, some of which include;

- Foreign Trade Aspects of Economic Development in Africa (Africa Progress Magazine,1973);
- Proceedings of the Workshop on Law and Population (Nairobi, 1975);
- Dr. Kwame Nkrumah on African Unity (The School Leaver Volume 1, No 12, Kampala, 1975);
- Manpower, and Employment in Southern Africa with Special Reference to Botswana, Lesotho and Swaziland (International Institute for Labour Studies, Geneva, 1977);
- Economics of Migratory Labour Exploitation in Southern Africa: Implications for Migrants & Supplier Countries (International Institute for Labour Studies, Geneva, 1981);
- Against Apartheid: SIDA Development Assistance to Lesotho, 1966-93 (co-authored with Tyrell Duncan and Karin Metell, Swedish International Development Cooperation Agency, Stockholm, 1994).

== Personal life ==
Baffoe was married in Ghana and had a daughter Grace. Following divorce, he married Elfi Dahlmann, with who he had one child, writer Kojo Baffoe. Following the passing of Elfi Baffoe, he married Mokone Tlale. Together they had two sons and one daughter before divorcing in the mid-1980s. He later married Mrs. Emelia Baffoe. Baffoe died on 13 December 2016 and was survived by his then wife Emelia and his five children, including writer and poet Kojo Baffoe (also known as Frank Kojo Baffoe Jr). Baffoe wrote and spoke German fluently. He also had working knowledge in the french language. His hobbies included traveling, listening to music, having discussions, dancing, and writing.
