= Nick Moore (filmmaker) =

British film editor and director

Nick Moore is a British film director and editor. He directed the 2011 British Movie Horrid Henry: The Movie. He directed the 2008 Wild Child, and other previous work included editing the 1997 The Full Monty for which he was nominated for a BAFTA award, the 1999 hit Notting Hill, the 2002 About a Boy for which he was nominated for the American Cinema Editors Award for Best Edited Feature Film – Comedy or Musical, and the 2003 Love Actually.

== Filmography ==
=== Director ===
- Wild Child (2008)
- Horrid Henry: The Movie (2011)
- Pudsey: The Movie (2014)
- This Time Next Year (2024)

=== Editor ===
- The Full Monty (1997)
- The Land Girls (1998)
- Divorcing Jack (1998)
- Notting Hill (1999)
- Beautiful Joe (2000)
- What's the Worst That Could Happen? (2001)
- Ghost World (2001)
- All the Queen's Men (2001)
- About a Boy (2002)
- Love Actually (2003)
- Along Came Polly (2004)
- Christmas with the Kranks (2004)
- Nanny McPhee (2005)
- Freedomland (2006)
- Little Man (2006)
- Meet Bill (2007)
- Last Chance Harvey (2008)
- Leap Year (2010)
- Morning Glory (2010)
- Mirror Mirror (2012)
- Enough Said (2013)
- Finding Fanny (2014)
- She's Funny That Way (2014)
- Jenny's Wedding (2015)
- Burnt (2015)
- Bridget Jones's Baby (2016)
- The Ottoman Lieutenant (2017)
- Patrick (2018)
- King of Thieves (2018)
- Are You There God? It's Me, Margaret. (2023)
- Red, White & Royal Blue (2023)
