= Charlotte Hope =

English actress

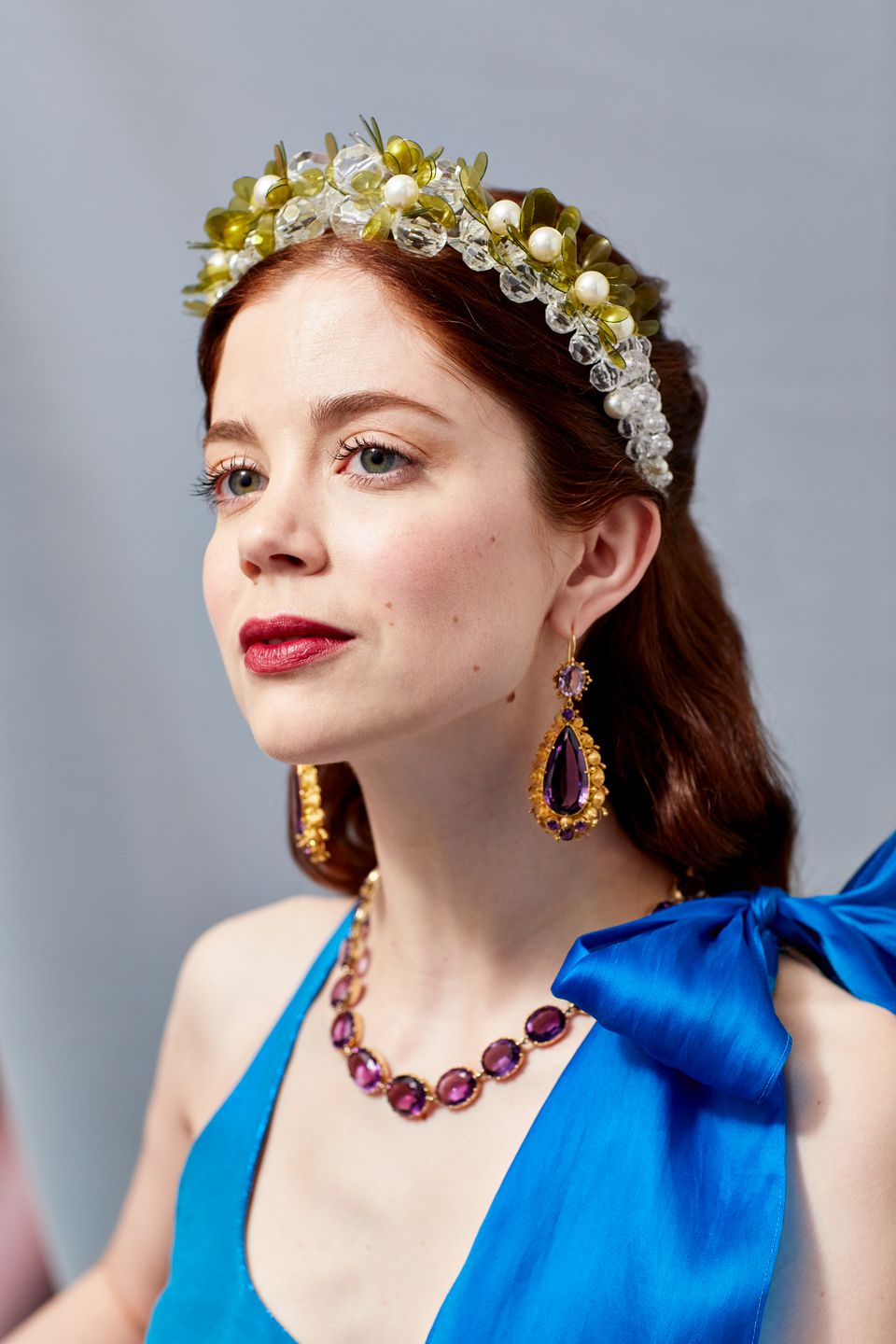
- Born: Salisbury, Wiltshire, England
- Education: University of Oxford
- Occupation: Actress
- Years active: 2010–present
- Children: 1

Charlotte Hope is an English actress. She first achieved recognition for her recurring role as Myranda in the third to fifth seasons of the HBO fantasy series Game of Thrones (2013–2016). Hope gained further prominence in the lead role of Catherine of Aragon on the Starz historical drama series The Spanish Princess (2019–2020). In 2020, she appeared as a series regular on the second season of the ITV thriller Bancroft and the Netflix biographical drama The English Game. Hope headlined the Showmax true crime series Catch Me a Killer as South African profiler Micki Pistorius in 2024, for which she was nominated for an International Emmy award in the Best Actress category.

Outside television, Hope's film roles include The Theory of Everything (2014), The Nun (2018), and The Chelsea Cowboy (2023). She also voiced Sally Boyle, one of the playable characters in the action-adventure video game We Happy Few (2018).

== Early life and education ==
Hope was born in Salisbury and grew up in Lower Daggons, a rural hamlet in the New Forest District of Hampshire.

Hope attended boarding school. She first discovered acting through a drama class at school. She went on to study French and Spanish at the University of Oxford. Whilst there, she found an agent and began taking jobs in theatre and commercials. Upon graduation from Oxford, Hope spent a year in Paris training in acting at L'École Internationale de Théâtre Jacques Lecoq.

== Career ==
Hope made her film debut as a factory worker in the 2012 musical Les Miserables.

In 2013, Hope began playing the role of Myranda, in HBO's fantasy drama series Game of Thrones. She continued in the role until the fifth season. In 2014, she guest starred in the first season of The Musketeers, playing the role of Charlotte Mellendorf. That same year, she appeared in the film The Theory of Everything, portraying Philippa Hawking, the younger sister of Stephen Hawking. In 2015, she had a leading role in the British gangster film North v South as Willow Clarke. That same year, Hope appeared in the music video "Beautiful to Me" by Olly Murs.

In 2016, Hope appeared in the biographical romantic drama A United Kingdom and the romantic thriller Allied. In 2017, she had a supporting role in the drama film Three Christs and in 2018, she co-starred in the horror film The Nun.

Hope has also done theatre work, including Broadway shows such as Buried Child where she played the role of Shelly in 2016. In 2017 she played the role of Zara in Almeida Theatre's Albion and in 2018 she played as Dr. Michaels' mother in The New Group's Good for Otto.

In March 2018, Hope was cast in the lead role of the Starz series The Spanish Princess, in which she plays Catherine of Aragon. The show is a follow-up to The White Queen and The White Princess.

In January 2020, she appeared as Annabel Connors, a main character in Season 2 of Bancroft opposite Sarah Parish. Having worked with Danish director Birgitte Stærmouse on the first season of The Spanish Princess, the pair teamed up again for Netflix's miniseries The English Game, which also aired in 2020.

She plays South African criminal profiler Micki Pistorius in the 2024 Showmax series Catch Me a Killer.

In 2025, she played series regular Sherry Felton in season one of the TV adaptations of Parnell Hall’s Puzzle Lady books, Murder Most Puzzling.

By January 2026, she was cast in the horror film Evil Dead Wrath from director Francis Galluppi.

== Personal life ==
After meeting on the set of The Spanish Princess in 2018, Hope began a relationship with her co-star Ruairi O'Connor. In November 2025, she announced that the couple had recently welcomed their first child.

== Filmography ==
Key
†	Denotes projects that have not yet been released

=== Film ===
Year	Title	Role	Notes	Ref.
2012	Les Misérables	Factory Woman		
2013	The Invisible Woman	Effie		
2014	Insomniacs	Jenny	Short film	
2014	The Theory of Everything	Phillipa Hawking		
2014	Testament of Youth	Betty	Uncredited	
2015	North v South	Willow Clarke		
2015	Miss You Already	Young Jess		
2016	A United Kingdom	Olivia Lancaster		
2016	Allied	Louise		
2017	Diana and I	Sophie Lewis	Television film	
2017	Three Christs	Becky Henderson		
2018	The Nun	Sister Victoria		
2023	The Piper	Melanie Walker		
2024	Meet Me by the Sea	Anna	Short film	
2024	It Was English	Mal	Short film	
2025	Bury Me When I'm Dead	Catherine Samsa		
2028	Evil Dead Wrath †	TBA	Filming	

=== Television ===
Year	Title	Role	Notes	Ref.
2010	Casualty	Ava Dunlop	Episode: "A Day in a Life"	
2010	Missing	Caitlin Morgan	Episode: "Control"	
2011	Waking the Dead	Abigail Harding	Episode: "Care"	
2012	Doctors	Niamh Curram	Episode: "Full Time"	
2012	Some Girls	Jenny	Episode: "Series 1, Episode 4"	
2012–2013	Holby City	Eleanor Campbell	Recurring role; 3 episodes	
2013	Love and Marriage	Alice	Episode: "Who's the Boss?"	
2013	Law & Order: UK	Holly Leigh	Episode: "Fatherly Love"	
2013	Whitechapel	Josie Eagle	Recurring role; 2 episodes	
2013–2016	Game of Thrones	Myranda	Recurring role; 8 episodes	
2014	The Musketeers	Charlotte Mellendorf	Guest role; 2 episodes	
2014	Vera	Saskia Barnes	Episode: "The Deer Hunters"	
2014	Playhouse Presents	Primrose	Episode: "Marked"	
2016	Death in Paradise	Lucy Preville	Episode: "One for the Road"	
2016	Houdini & Doyle	Molly Morgan	Episode: "Bedlam"	
2018	Endeavour	Eve Thorne	Episode: "Muse"	
2019–2020	The Spanish Princess	Catherine of Aragon	Series regular; 16 episodes	
2020	The English Game	Margaret Alma Kinnaird	Miniseries; 6 episodes	
2024	Catch Me a Killer	Micki Pistorius	Miniseries; 11 episodes	
2025–2026	Murder Most Puzzling	Sherry Carter	Series regular; 6 episodes	
2026	The Hairdresser Mysteries	Sophie Sweetley	Episode: "The Immortal Mrs Marigold"	

=== Video games ===
Year	Title	Role	Notes
2013	Ryse: Son of Rome	Oracle	
2018	We Happy Few	Sally Boyle	

== Stage ==
Year	Title	Role	Notes
2012	Belarus	The Woman	Arcola Theatre
2013	Outlines	Various	Old Red Lion Theatre
2015	A Midsummer Night's Dream	Hermia	Liverpool Everyman
2016	Buried Child	Shelly	Trafalgar Studios
2017	Albion	Zara	Almeida Theatre
2018	Good for Otto	Mom	The Alice Griffin Jewel Box Theatre
