= This Time Next Year (film) =

American romantic comedy film

- Directed by: Nick Moore
- Screenplay by: Sophie Cousens
- Based on: This Time Next Year by Sophie Cousens
- Produced by: Erika Hossington; Giuliano Papadia; Herbert L. Kloiber
- Starring: Lucien Laviscount; Sophie Cookson
- Cinematography: Luca Ciuti
- Music by: Michael Price
- Production companies: Night Train Media; BlackBox Multimedia; Vargo
- Distributed by: Signature Entertainment
- Release date: June 3, 2024
- Countries: Germany; United Kingdom
- Language: English

This Time Next Year is a 2024 romantic comedy film directed by Nick Moore, starring Lucien Laviscount and Sophie Cookson. It is an adaptation by Sophie Cousens of her novel of the same name. It was released in the United Kingdom on 3 June 2024.

== Premise ==
Quinn (Laviscount) and Minnie (Cookson) were born only two minutes apart on New Year's day. They meet by chance 30 years later and realise they were born in the same hospital on the same day, but their lives have gone in different directions since then.

== Cast ==
- Lucien Laviscount as Quinn
- Sophie Cookson as Minnie
- John Hannah as Keith
- Monica Dolan as Connie
- Golda Rosheuvel as Tara
- Mandip Gill as Leila
- Will Hislop as Greg
- Charlie Oscar as Fleur
- Keala Settle as Bev
- Jasmyn Banks as Younger Connie
- Anita Dobson as Mrs Mentis

== Production ==
The film is an adaptation by Sophie Cousen of her novel. It is produced by Night Train Media and BlackBox Multimedia. Producers include Erika Hossington with Giuliano Papadia for BlackBox Multimedia and Herbert L. Kloiber for Night Train Media. Director Nick Moore has a long history of working in the genre having been the editor of films such as Notting Hill and Love Actually.

=== Casting ===
The cast is led by Sophie Cookson and Lucien Laviscount who were announced in April 2023. Also in the cast are John Hannah, Monica Dolan, Golda Rosheuvel and Mandip Gill.

=== Filming ===
Principal photography took place in Italy and finished in late 2023.
