= Barakat (2020 film) =

2021 South African family drama film

- Directed by: Amy Jephta
- Written by: Amy Jephta
- Produced by: Ephraim Gordon; Wikus du Toit
- Starring: Vinette Ebrahim; Joey Rasdien; Mortimer Williams; Quanita Adams; Keeno Lee Hectormade
- Cinematography: Ebrahim Hajee
- Edited by: Sanjin Muftic
- Music by: Kyle Shepherd
- Production companies: Nagvlug; PaperJet Productions
- Distributed by: Indigenous Film Distribution
- Release dates: September 2020 (Urbanworld); 28 May 2021 (South Africa)
- Running time: 103 minutes
- Country: South Africa
- Languages: Afrikaans; English
- Box office: $66,181

Barakat is a 2020 South African family drama film directed by Amy Jephta and produced by Ephraim Gordon. It is the first Afrikaans-language Muslim feature film produced in South Africa. The film stars Vinette Ebrahim in the lead role and Joey Rasdien, Mortimer Williams, Quanita Adams and Keeno Lee Hector in supportive roles.

== Plot ==
The film deals with family problems where an ageing matriarch brings together her fractured, dysfunctional family over Eid-al-Fitr in order to introduce her new romantic partner, after her husband's death some years ago.

== Cast ==
- Vinette Ebrahim as Aisha Davids
- Joey Rasdien as Zunaid
- Mortimer Williams as Zaid
- Quanita Adams as Ra-eesah
- Keeno Lee Hector as Yaseen
- Danny Ross as Nur
- June van Merch as Fadielah
- Bonnie Mbuli as Gwen

== Production ==
The film was shot in and around Lansdowne and Athlone on the Cape Flats, Cape Town, South Africa.

== Release ==
The film made its theatrical premiere on 28 May 2021 in Cape Town, hosted by Vangate Mall. The film received positive reviews from critics and screened in many global film festivals. The film was selected to screen as the closing film for Film Africa 2020 in London, but this was later cancelled due to the second lockdown in the United Kingdom. The film was officially selected for 2020 Urbanworld, Black TIFF 2021 and the 2021 Pan African Film Festival as well.

Barakat received many awards. In 2020, at the Motion Pictures International Film Festival, the film won the awards for the Best Narrative Feature, Best Editing and Best Production. In the same year at the Idyllwild International Festival of Cinema, Barakat won four more awards: Mary Austin Award Excellence in Directing, Best Ensemble Cast, Best International Feature and Best Supporting Actor as well as won the Runner Up award for the Best Original Score as well. The film was selected as South Africa's entry for Best International Feature Film at the 94th Academy Awards, but it did not end up receiving a nomination.

== See also ==
- List of submissions to the 94th Academy Awards for Best International Feature Film
- List of South African submissions for the Academy Award for Best International Feature Film
