= Elizabeth Sneddon =

- Born: 26 October 1907; Durban
- Died: 24 November 2005 (aged 98); Durban
- Education: Durban Girls' College
- Alma mater: University of Glasgow; University of London
- Occupation(s): Drama teacher and academic

Elizabeth Sneddon (1907–2005) was a South African speech and drama teacher, theatrical director and academic.

== Education ==
Sneddon attended Durban Girls' College, before earning an MA Honours degree in English from the University of Glasgow, followed by a post-graduate teacher training degree at the University of London. She also attended the Royal Academy of Music where she obtained a licentiate.

== Work in speech and drama teaching ==
Sneddon was appointed as the senior English teacher at St Cyprian's School, Cape Town. In 1950 she was awarded a Nuffield Dominion Travelling Fellowship to study speech and drama at British universities.

After her academic studies in the United Kingdom she returned to Durban and opened a speech and drama studio. Mabel Palmer, of the University of Natal invited Sneddon to give extra mural classes to the black students enrolled at the University of South Africa who were excluded from the white universities. The University of Durban-Westville had its origins in this venture. Sneddon founded and became the inaugural head of the department of Speech and Drama at the University of Natal. Sneddon was also instrumental in having drama accepted as an examination subject at the high school level in South African schools.

Sneddon directed many plays including Oedipus and King Lear.

== Legacy ==
The Elizabeth Sneddon Theatre on the campus of the University of KwaZulu–Natal was named in her honour in 1981.

== Works ==
- Speech Training for You!. Kendall/Hunt. 2001. ISBN 978-0-7872-8202-8.
