= Patricia Hiddleston =

Scottish Educationalist and Mathematician

- Born: 9 May 1933; Troon, Ayrshire, Scotland
- Died: 8 December 2017 (aged 84); Edinburgh, Scotland
- Education: University of Edinburgh and University of South Africa
- Occupations: Mathematician and educator
- Employer(s): University of Zambia St Margaret's School, Edinburgh; Durban Girls' College University of Malawi

Patricia Hiddleston (9 May 1933 – 8 December 2017), also known as Pat Hiddleston, was a Scottish mathematician who spent most of her professional career in Northern Rhodesia, central Africa.

== Early life ==
Patricia Wallace was born 9 May 1933 to hotel proprietors Harry and Jessie Wallace of Troon. She achieved good grades in school and went on to study mathematics and natural philosophy at the University of Edinburgh. She graduated in 1956 with a double first and was awarded the Napier medal for mathematics.

== Career ==
In July 1956 she graduated and, the same month, married George Hiddleston and became Pat Hiddleston. She and her husband applied to the Colonial Office for a posting abroad and were allocated to Northern Rhodesia.

Hiddleston worked at Munali Secondary School, then a teacher training college near Lusaka. She studied for a doctorate at the University of South Africa and was subsequently made the first member of the mathematics department of the University of Zambia, where she lectured from 1965–1970.

After 14 years, Hiddleston and her family returned to Scotland so that the four children could have higher education there. Hiddleston was the Headmistress of St Margaret's School, Edinburgh.

In 1984, Hiddleston relocated to South Africa to become the Principal of Durban Girls' College, where she oversaw the school's move to admit all races.

Hiddleston then went to teach mathematics education at the University of Malawi in 1988. She continued this work until her husband's death in 1996, after which she moved into a consulting career involving advising governments on encouraging women into STEM studies and teacher training and development.

Hiddleston also co-wrote and edited a number of textbooks.

== Later life, death, and commemoration ==
Hiddleston volunteered at the 2014 Commonwealth Games in Glasgow and was honoured by the University of Edinburgh Institute of Mathematics for life services to maths education in 2015.

Hiddleston continued to work until age 82, when she became ill whilst on a trip to Bangladesh and was diagnosed with ovarian cancer.

In 2018, the University of Edinburgh began offering a Patricia Hiddleston Summer Scholarship.
