= Durban Girls' College =

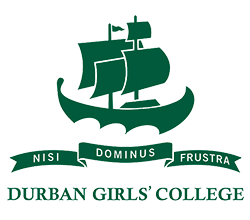

Location
- Durban, KwaZulu-Natal; South Africa; 29°50′05″S 31°00′26″E

Information
- Type: Independent, boarding
- Motto: Latin: Nisi Dominus Frustra (Without God, all is in vain)
- Established: 1877
- Locale: Urban
- Executive Head: Heidi Rea
- Head of Primary School: Chris Taylor
- Grades: 00 - 12
- Enrollment: 810 girls
- Colors: Bottle green and white
- Exam board: IEB
- Website: www.dgc.co.za

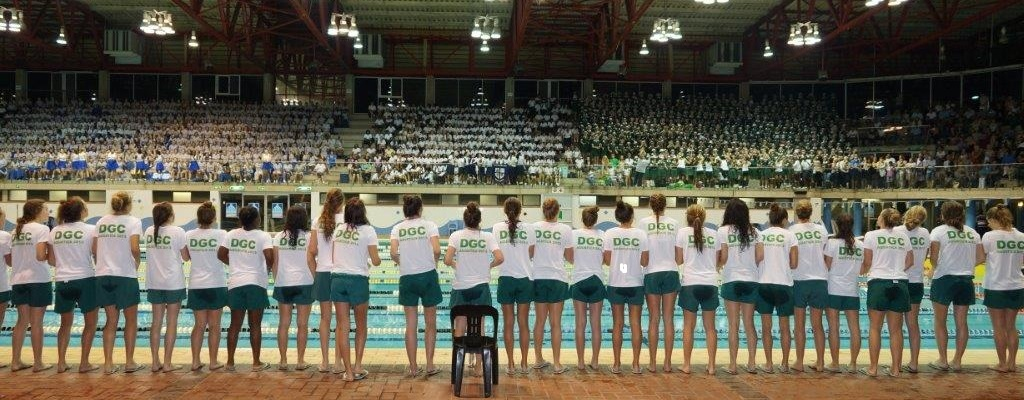
D&D Gala winners 2013

Durban Girls' College, founded in 1877, is a Christian, independent boarding and day school for girls, with weekly boarding facilities for high school pupils, located on the Berea, overlooking the city of Durban in KwaZulu-Natal, South Africa.

== Notable alumnae ==
- Kate Woods, South African field hockey player
- Kirsten Goss, jewellery designer
- Andrea Kleinloog, interior designer
- Lara Logan, television journalist for Fox News
- Claire Palley, academic and lawyer
- Professor Elizabeth Sneddon, playwright
- Khanyi Dhlomo, South African TV Host and the founder and CEO of Ndalo Media and Ndalo Luxury Ventures
- Tarina Patel, Actress, model, film producer
- Kamini Pather, chef
- Sarah Pudifin-Jones, lawyer
- June Drummond, author of crime novels
- Renée Schuurman, tennis player
- Patricia Hiddlestone, principal of Durban Girls' College
- Renée Schuurman, tennis player

== College anthem ==
The college anthem is All Hail the College Galleon, composed by old girl, June Drummond in 1940.
