= To Be a Machine =

2017 nonfiction book by Mark O'Connell

To Be a Machine: Adventures Among Cyborgs, Utopians, Hackers, and the Futurists Solving the Modest Problem of Death
- First edition
- Author: Mark O'Connell
- Language: English
- Subject: Transhumanism
- Publisher: Granta Publications
- Publication date: 2017
- Media type: Print
- ISBN: 9781783781973
- Followed by: Notes from an Apocalypse
- Website: grantabooks.com/to-be-a-machine

To Be a Machine: Adventures Among Cyborgs, Utopians, Hackers, and the Futurists Solving the Modest Problem of Death is a 2017 nonfiction book by Slate columnist and literary journalist Mark O'Connell, his debut work. Published by Granta, the book is a breezy, but skeptical, gonzo-journalistic tour of transhumanism and radical life extension. It chronicles O'Connell's travels around the world to interview prominent transhumanists.

== Description ==
Interviewees range from mainstream figures, such as computer scientist Stuart J. Russell, to more colorful individuals, such as Zoltan Istvan, who ran for the American Presidency on the "Immortality Ticket". Much of the book focuses on radical life extension (the desire to engineer immortality); in addition, O'Connell visits a group of "grinders" in Pittsburgh who surgically implant sensors into themselves.

O'Connell makes it clear that he personally chooses to reject transhumanist philosophy, stating that his child playing horsy with his wife could not be "rendered in code... Their beauty was bodily, in the most profound sense, in the saddest and most wonderful sense." The book also examines existential risk from artificial general intelligence, the fear that superintelligent machines will destroy the human race. An oversimplified example would be a machine that is asked to eliminate human cancer, and does so by eliminating all humans.

In the book's conclusion, O'Connell declines to offer any predictions about whether the hopes or fears of the transhumanists will come to pass, instead stating: "I have seen the present, and the present is strange enough to be getting along with: filled with strange people, strange ideas, strange machines."

To Be a Machine was described by Publishers Weekly as "a stimulating overview of modern scientific realities once thought to be the exclusive purview of science fiction" and in The New York Times review it was characterised as "a wonderful, breezy romp filled with the beginnings of philosophical reflections on the meaning of the techno-utopians’ search for immortality, or as O’Connell puts it, 'solving death.'"
