= Khanyi Dhlomo =

South African journalist (born 1972)

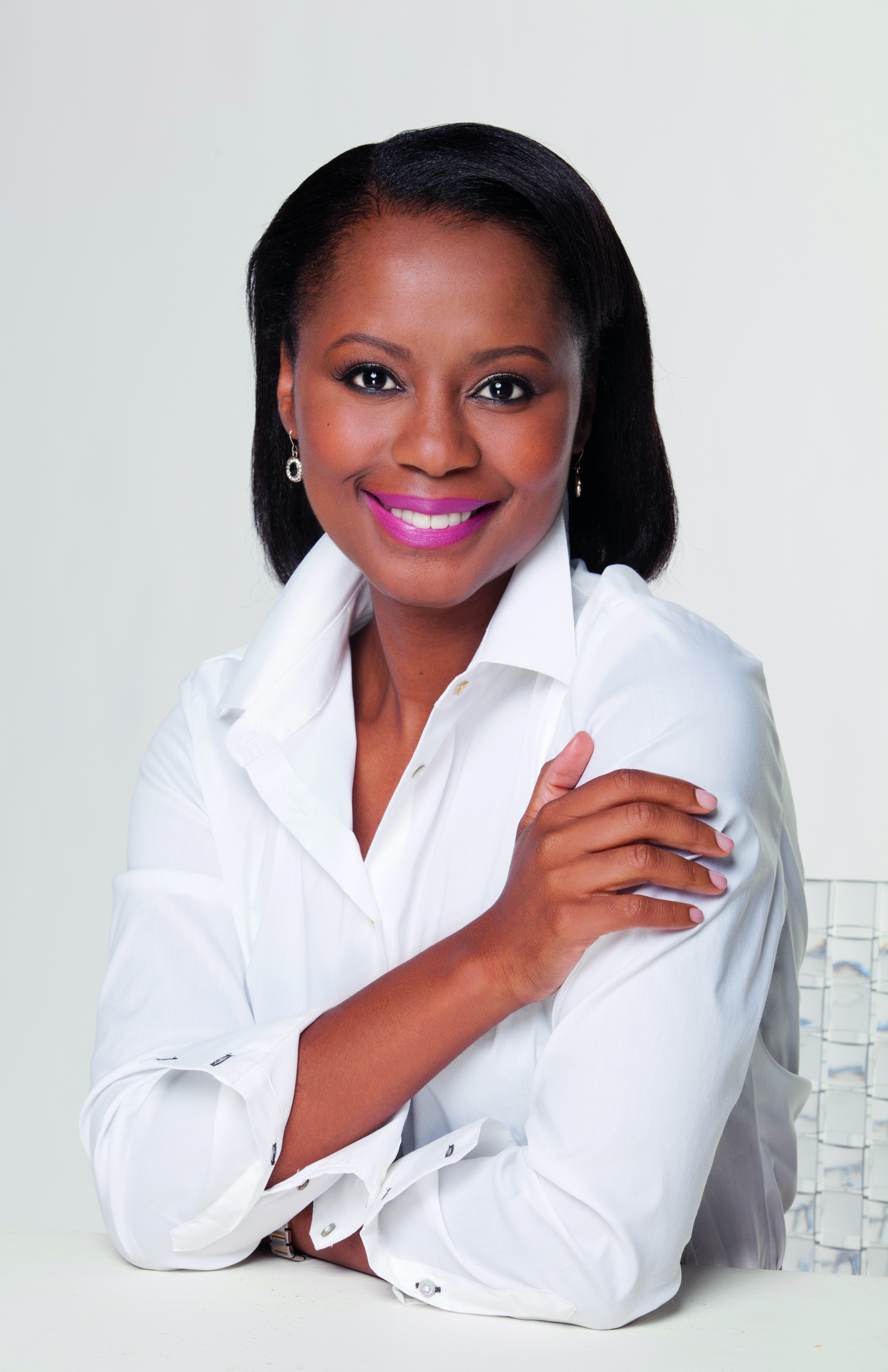
- Khanyi Dhlomo in 2014
- Born: Khanyisile Dhlomo; 17 December 1972 (age 53); Umlazi, KwaZulu-Natal, South Africa
- Education: Durban Girls' College; University of South Africa, BA Communications and Industrial Psychology; MBA Harvard Business School
- Occupations: Editor, entrepreneur
- Known for: Destiny, various business ventures
- Partner(s): Dr Sthembiso Mkhize (1992–2003); Chinezi Chijioke (2009–present)

Khanyi Dhlomo (born 17 December 1972) is a South African journalist and magazine editor.

== Early life ==
Dhlomo was born in Umlazi, KwaZulu-Natal, the daughter of Oscar Dhlomo. (Note: Oscar Dhlomo was member of the KwaZulu Legislative Assembly for Umbumbulu, yamkela matebese Minister of Education and Culture, KwaZulu, Secretary General, Inkatha yeNkululeko yeSizwe, Executive Chairman, Institute for Multi-Party Democracy) She went to school at Durban Girls' College, in Durban. While there, she won the Thandi Face Cover Girl competition at the age of 16, which sparked her interest in media.

She studied journalism at the University of Witwatersrand.

== Career ==
In 1995, 20-year-old Dhlomo was hired as a news anchor at the South African Broadcasting Corporation (SABC), becoming the national broadcaster's first black newscaster. At the age of 22 Dhlomo was appointed as editor of True Love Magazine. Within a year of her appointment, the magazine's circulation doubled from 70,000 to 140,000 and the magazine became the most widely read women's magazine in South Africa.

After eight years at True Love with a circulation of 1.9 million, Dhlomo stepped down as editor. Following the end of her first marriage she relocated to France where she worked as manager of South Africa's Tourism Board in Paris. In 2007 she graduated from Harvard Business School with an MBA which is where she met her second husband Chinezi Chijioke.

In 2007 she returned home to South Africa at which time she founded Ndalo Media in partnership with Naspers and successfully published Destiny Magazine. In 2008 Dhlomo launched DestinyConnect.com which serves as the online extension of Destiny magazine. In July 2009 Destiny Man, edited by Kojo Baffoe and it's online extension, DestinyMan.com were launched together.

In 2013, Dhlomo launched a boutique department store, Luminance.

In 2018, in keeping with the decline of print-based media businesses worldwide, Dhlomo took the decision to close her publishing media ventures. In December 2018, Sowetan Live reported that company owner Khanyi Dhlomo had told employees that her media company, Ndalo Media, would shut down on January 31, 2019. In October 2019, The Media Online reported that former staff members of the magazines Destiny and Destiny Man were pursuing legal action against the company and their former employers for the alleged non-receipt of the contractually agreed upon retrenchment packages following the liquidation of the company.

== Awards ==
- 2001 AdVantage Magazine Editor of the Year
- Most Influential Woman in South African Media 2003
