= The Good Samaritan (upcoming film) =

- Directed by: Pierre Morel
- Written by: Matthew Cirulnick
- Produced by: Mark Canton; Dorothy Canton; Renee Tab; David Lipper; Bobby Daly
- Starring: Daisy Ridley; Josh Duhamel; Sharlto Copley; Lucien Laviscount
- Production companies: Canton Entertainment; Oakhurst Entertainment; Sentient Entertainment; Latigo Films
- Country: United States
- Language: English

The Good Samaritan is an upcoming American action thriller film directed by Pierre Morel and written by Matthew Cirulnick. It stars Daisy Ridley, Josh Duhamel, Sharlto Copley, and Lucien Laviscount.

== Premise ==
A couple, hoping to mend their troubled marriage, embark on a dream cruise in remote parts of the globe. When they pluck a floating man from the sea who was left for dead, their good deed is immediately punished.

== Cast ==
- Daisy Ridley as Dr. Rosalind Carver
- Josh Duhamel as Sean Fuller
- Sharlto Copley as Langbore
- Lucien Laviscount as Matt Carver

== Production ==
In November 2025, it was announced that Pierre Morel would be directing an action thriller film starring Daisy Ridley. In February 2026, Josh Duhamel and Sharlto Copley joined the cast. Principal photography began in September 2026, in Brisbane, with Lucien Laviscount joining the cast.
