= Jonathan Lee (novelist) =

British writer (born 1981)

- Born: 24 April 1981 (age 45); Surrey, England
- Occupation: Writer
- Years active: 2010–present
- Notable work: Who Is Mr Satoshi? (2010), Joy (2012), High Dive (2015)
- Awards: Society of Authors K. Blundell Trust Award (2013); Desmond Elliott Prize (Shortlisted) (2012); Barnes & Noble Discover Great New Writers Selection (2015); Encore Award (Shortlisted) (2013); MJA Open Book Award (shortlisted) (2013); Sunday Times EFG Private Bank Short Story Award (Longlisted) (2014)

Jonathan Lee (born 24 April 1981) is a British writer known for his novels Who Is Mr Satoshi?, Joy, High Dive, and The Great Mistake.

Jonathan Lee was born in Surrey, England in 1981, and graduated from the University of Bristol with a First in English Literature. He was working as a solicitor when he wrote his debut novel Who Is Mr. Satoshi?

== Literary career ==
Lee's debut novel, Who Is Mr Satoshi? was a runner-up in the Edinburgh Festival's First Book Award 2010 and was shortlisted for the Desmond Elliott Prize for literature in 2011.

Lee's second novel, Joy, was released in June 2012. The Guardian noted the resemblance of Joy to the death of Lee's former colleague in 2007.

After the publication of Joy, Lee won a Society of Authors K Blundell Trust Award and was long listed for the Sunday Times EFG Short Story Award.

His third novel, High Dive, was published in the UK in 2015. The novel fictionalises the events of the real-life Brighton Hotel bombing by the Provisional Irish Republican Army in 1984, in their attempt to assassinate UK Prime Minister Margaret Thatcher. Lee defended his decision to tell the story through largely fictional characters.

In 2021 Lee's novel The Great Mistake was published, concerning the life and death of New York civic leader Andrew Haswell Green. The Great Mistake was selected as WNYC's "Get Lit" book club pick for September 2021.

== Personal life ==
Lee relocated to New York from London in 2012.

In 2021 Lee was appointed Editorial Director of the publisher Bloomsbury.

== Screenwriting ==
In May 2016 Pulse Films and Addictive Pictures acquired the film rights to Lee's novel High Dive with Brian Kirk to direct. In 2018, it was announced that Lee would write the script with Academy Award-winning screenwriter Eric Roth.
