= Lucien Laviscount =

British actor (born 1992)

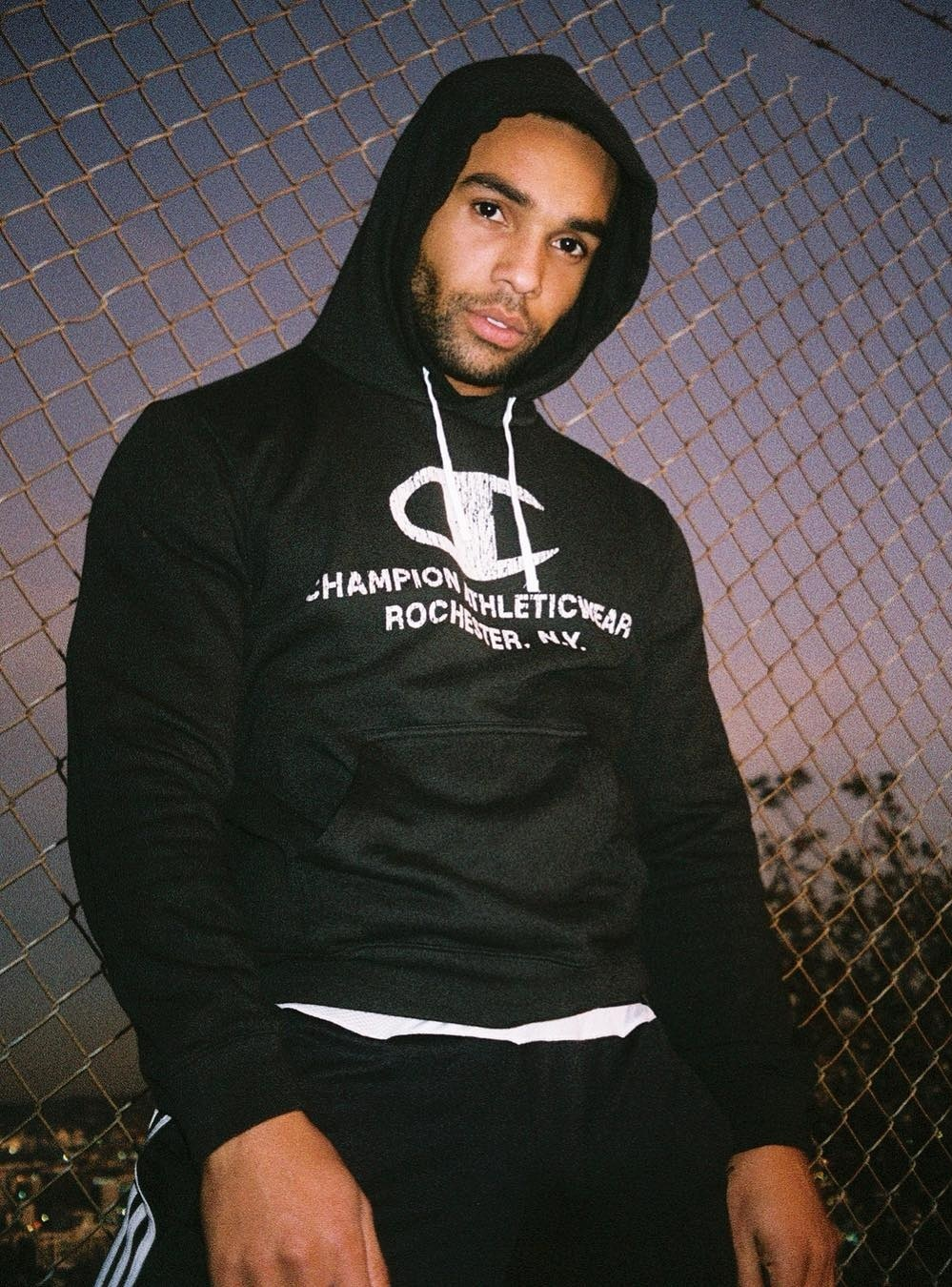
- Laviscount in 2019
- Born: Lucien Leon Laviscount; 9 June 1992 (age 34); Burnley, Lancashire, England
- Occupation: Actor
- Years active: 2002–present

Lucien Leon Laviscount (/ˈlævɪskaʊnt/; born 9 June 1992) is an English actor. He began his career in 2002 with an appearance in an advertising campaign for Marks & Spencer and later established himself on British television. Laviscount first came to prominence with roles in the teen drama Grange Hill in 2007. He later appeared in ITV's Coronation Street (2009) and BBC One's school drama Waterloo Road (2010–11).

Laviscount continued to work in television, appearing in episodes of Skins and Shameless, and later in the comedy series Supernatural: Bloodlines and Episodes. In 2015, Laviscount played a regular character, Earl Grey, in the first season of the horror comedy Scream Queens on FOX. In 2017–18, he starred as Billy Ayres in Sony Crackle’s crime comedy-drama Snatch based on the film of the same name, and appeared as Alexander Cabot in The CW series Katy Keene.

In 2021, he joined the main cast of the Netflix series Emily in Paris as Alfie, a British banker and recurring love interest of Lily Collins’ character Emily Cooper.

== Early life ==
Laviscount was born in Burnley, Lancashire, and raised in the nearby village of Read, Ribble Valley in Lancashire. His father, Eugene Laviscount, is a former body builder of Antiguan heritage, and his mother, Sonia Laviscount, is of English descent. He has an older brother, Louis, and a younger brother, Jules. He attended Ribblesdale High School in Clitheroe, where he was awarded 10 GCSEs. From a young age, Laviscount took an interest in performance and trained at Carol Godby’s Theatre Workshop in Bury, a drama school that has produced several British television actors.

== Career ==
At the age of ten, Laviscount appeared in an advertising campaign for Marks & Spencer. He went on to secure guest roles in television programmes such as Clocking Off and Johnny and the Bomb before becoming a series regular in the BBC One drama Grange Hill. Laviscount was later cast as Ben Richardson a religious swimmer, in the ITV soap opera Coronation Street. He later appeared as Jonah Kirby, a school pupil, in the TV show Waterloo Road.

In 2011 Laviscount entered the Celebrity Big Brother house to compete as a housemate on the eighth series, the first to be broadcast on Channel 5.

In 2012, Laviscount signed with SK Records and released his debut single, Dance With You, featuring American rapper MANN.. Two years later, he was announced as the lead in Supernatural: Bloodlines, a spin-off of The CW series Supernatural. He appeared in the backdoor pilot episode, though the series was ultimately not commissioned. Laviscount gained wider recognition in the United States when he played Earl Grey in the first season of the FOX horror comedy Scream Queens. He continued to build his career in both the UK and US, appearing in Sony Crackle’s crime comedy-drama Snatch (2017–18), and as Alexander Cabot in The CW series Katy Keene.

In 2021, Laviscount joined the cast of the Netflix romantic comedy series Emily in Paris, playing Alfie, a British banker and the love interest of Emily Cooper (Lily Collins). His role continued through the show’s second and third seasons. He also starred in the BBC Three comedy Peacock (2022). In 2024, Laviscount appeared in the romantic comedy film This Time Next Year, based on the novel of the same name, and featured as the love interest in the music video for Puntería by Shakira and Cardi B. He is set to appear in the upcoming thriller Safe House, scheduled for release in 2025, and has also been cast in Tinseltown and the film adaptation of Emily Henry’s best-selling novel People We Meet on Vacation (2026). Alongside these projects, Laviscount has a number of additional film and television roles currently in development.

== Other ventures ==
With Zac Lichman, Laviscount opened two Kensal Rise joints: The Shop NW10, a cocktail bar and café, in 2018 and The Wealthy Beggar, a dive bar with food from Gareth Drew, in 2022.

=== Philanthropy ===
In 2010, Laviscount took part in a charity football match alongside Jack McMullen, Lyndon Ogbourne and other actors in aid of Sport Relief. Laviscount and Lichman were involved in a homelessness awareness campaign A Deed A Day with radio presenter Rio Fredrika and model and then partner Ana Tanaka. For Christmas 2018, the group ran a soup kitchen out of Laviscount and Lichman's The Shop NW10. Laviscount played football for England in Soccer Aid 2022.

== Filmography ==
Key
†	Denotes projects that have not yet been released

=== Film ===
Year	Title	Role	Notes	Ref.
2004	Millions	Lad 2	Uncredited	
2012	Midnight Sun	Charlie	Television film	
2013	The Selection	Aspen Leger	Television film	
2014	One Night in Istanbul	Joseph		
2014	Honeytrap	Troy		
2015	Point of Honor	Elijah	Television film	
2015	Runaway	Henry	Short film	
2015	Between Two Worlds	Connor		
2017	The Bye Bye Man	John		
2017	Love Beats Rhymes	Derek		
2021	Trust	Ansgar Doyle		
2022	We Are Not Alone	Robbie		
2022	Your Christmas or Mine?	Steve		
2023	Last Sentinel	Pvt. Sullivan		
2024	This Time Next Year	Quinn Hamilton		
2025	Safe House	Anderson		
2025	Tinsel Town	Callum		
2026	People We Meet on Vacation	Trey		
2026	Strung	Marcus Walker		
TBA	Borderline †	Paul	Post-production	
TBA	The Good Samaritan †	Matt Carver	Filming	

=== Television ===
Year	Title	Role	Notes	Ref.
2002	Clocking Off	Tom Wood	Episode: "Jenny's Story"	
2006	Johnny and the Bomb	Yo-Less	Miniseries; 3 episodes	
2006	New Street Law	Alfie French	Episode: "High Risk, High Profit"	
2007–2008	Grange Hill	Jake Briggs	Series regular; 13 episodes	
2008	Life Bites	Jake	Series regular	
2009	Father & Son	Elijah King	Miniseries; 1 episode	
2009	Coronation Street	Ben Richardson	Series regular; 30 episodes	
2010–2011	Waterloo Road	Jonah Kirby	Series regular; 18 episodes	
2011	Casualty	Liam Briggs	Episode: "Epiphany"	
2011	New Tricks	David Green	Episode: "Setting Out Your Stall"	
2011	Shameless	Dee	Episode: "Frank Gallagher: Sent By God"	
2011	Mount Pleasant	Lee	Recurring role; 2 episodes	
2012	Trollied	Stu	Recurring role; 4 episodes	
2013	Death in Paradise	Duncan Wood	Episode: "A Deadly Party"	
2013	The Syndicate	Matt Greco	Episode: "Luke"	
2013	Love Matters	Jake	Episode: "Kitten Chic"	
2013	Skins	Jason	Episode: "Rise"	
2014	Episodes	Brian	Recurring role; 3 episodes	
2014	Supernatural	Ennis Ross	Episode: "Bloodlines"	
2015	Scream Queens	Earl Grey	Series regular; 13 episodes	
2017	Still Star-Crossed	Romeo Montague	Episode: "In Fair Verona, Where We Lay Our Scene"	
2017–2018	Snatch	Billy 'Fuckin' Ayres	Series regular; 20 episodes	
2020	Katy Keene	Alexander Cabot	Series regular; 13 episodes	
2021	Threesome	John	Recurring role; 7 episodes	
2021–	Emily in Paris	Alfie	Series regular; ongoing	
2022–2025	Peacock	Jay	Series regular; 6 episodes	

=== Audio ===
Year	Title	Role	Notes
2024	The Regent	Peter Kelly	Main role

== Awards and nominations ==
Year	Awards	Category	Nominated work	Result	Ref.
2018	National Film Awards UK	Best Supporting Actor	Snatch	Nominated	
2022	MTV Movie & TV Awards	Best Kiss (shared with Lily Collins)	Emily in Paris	Nominated	
