= Kojo Baffoe =

South African writer

Frank Kojo Baffoe Jr.
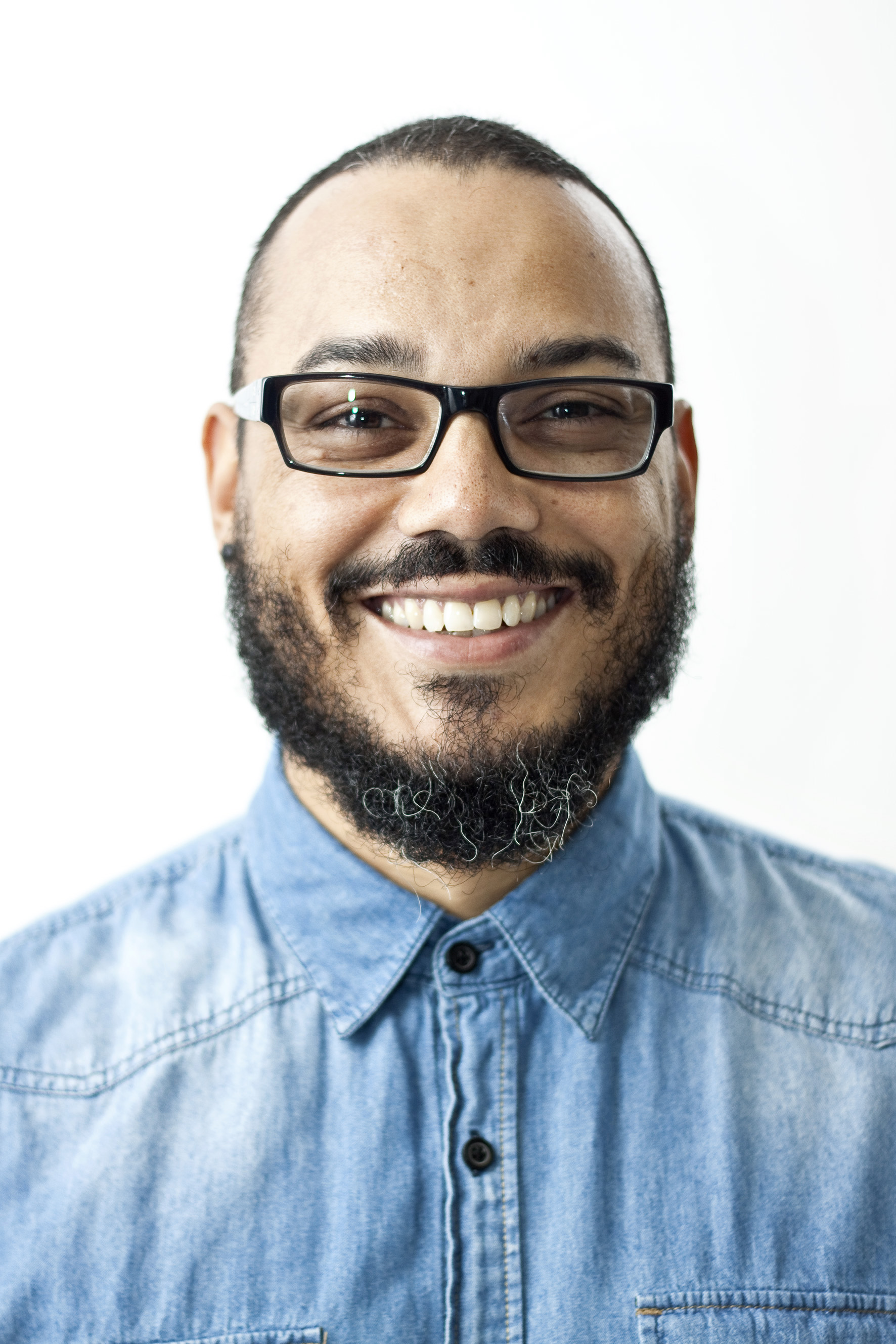
- Born: 10 April 1972; Munich, West Germany
- Education: University of KwaZulu-Natal
- Occupations: Editor, poet, writer, columnist
- Known for: Destiny Man
- Partner: Estelle Baffoe (2002 – present)
- Children: 1 son, 1 daughter
- Parent: Frank Baffoe
- Website: www.kojobaffoe.com

Frank Kojo Baffoe Jr. (known as Kojo Baffoe) is a writer, poet, blogger, media consultant (television and print), producer, columnist, former editor of Destiny Man, and is currently based in Johannesburg, South Africa.

== Early life ==
Kojo was born 10 April 1972 in Munich, Germany to a Ghanaian father and German mother. His father, Frank Baffoe was a businessman and diplomat based in Lesotho. He grew up in Maseru, Lesotho, where he finished his schooling at Machabeng High School in 1990. He then spent the following year as an exchange student back in his country of birth. In 1992, he moved to Durban, KwaZulu-Natal, South Africa, to study for a Bachelor of Commerce degree at the University of KwaZulu-Natal, after which he moved back to Lesotho and was part of numerous family-run business ventures.

== Back to South Africa ==
In the early 2000s, Baffoe returned to South Africa and consulted on various ventures and businesses; he then founded Baffoe Kakana (Baka) IT Consulting and later Monstafunk Productions. He went on to work as a producer on Making Moves (which won a Golden Horn for Best Educational Programme at the SAFTAs), Content Producer on Zwahashu, Afro Café, Zooming in on Men.

== Poetry ==
Baffoe's first attempts at poetry were at the Jungle Connection in 1999 in Doornfontein, Johannesburg, where he started to learn the craft of performance, rather than just "getting onto stages and mumbling poetry" or "merely just reciting of words", as he puts it.

=== Poetry Performance ===
Highlights of his performances include:

- CIDA City Campus Mini Concert, 2003
- British Council SA presents The Writers Ball, 2004
- Urban Voices Poetry Festival, 2005
- Voices In My Head Pre-Launch, 2005
- Dialogue with former President Thabo Mbeki, GIBS, 2006
- Poetry Africa SlamJam (only in Joburg Show), October 2006
- Arts Alive Speak Your Mind
- Hammer & Tongue Poetry Slam Tour, 13 cities in the United Kingdom, November–December 2006
- Jozi Spoken Word Festival, 2007

Along with performing Kojo has facilitated various workshops and been part of several poetry commissions up till his hiatus from 2008 till early 2013.

== Print and digital media ==
Baffoe was founding editor of Blaque Magazine in 2008, a columnist for City Press between 2009 and 2011, and has been the editor of Destiny Man since August 2010. He has been an avid blogger, with Infinite Pursuit on Blogspot, KojoBaffoe on WordPress, KojoBaffoe on Tumblr (to name a few), and finally settling on his own website KojoBaffoe.com, while still being active on various social networks. He recently published a collection of autobiographical short stories by Pan Macmillan South Africa called Listen to Your Footsteps.

For me, they are other platforms for communicating and for writing. My blogs were an opportunity to write regularly and share content. Social media is great for understanding people and society, for story ideas, for debate and engagement, for the sharing of thoughts, etc. ~ Kojo

== See also ==
- Destiny Magazine
- Khanyi Dhlomo
