= Knightsbridge University =

Unaccredited educational institution in Denmark

Knightsbridge University was a private distance learning institution based in Denmark that catered mostly to English speaking people. It was founded in 1991 by Henrik Fyrst Kristensen. Although the school was based in Denmark, John Bear's guide in 2003 states that Knightsbridge was formerly incorporated in Liberia and at time of publication was incorporated in Antigua and Barbuda, while using a mailing address in Scotland.

Knightsbridge University appears to have been no longer active since some time before 2010.

== Accreditation and licensing status ==
Knightsbridge University was not accredited and was not officially recognized as an educational institution in Denmark. Its degrees and credits might not be acceptable to employers or other institutions, and use of its degree titles may be restricted or illegal in some jurisdictions. Several American states identify Knightsbridge as a school that does not have appropriate legal authority to issue degrees. In 2006 Bear told the Irish Independent that "Knightsbridge most emphatically is not licensed or recognised by the Danish government (or any other government on Earth)." Formerly Knightsbridge claimed accreditation from the World Association of Universities and Colleges, an unrecognised accreditation agency. However, since 2003, Knightsbridge University has been registered as a limited company in Denmark. Danish law does not restrict private institutions without public funding from operating without approval or accreditation by Danish authorities, but their students are not eligible for state study grants.

In 2009, it was listed as a diploma mill by the American Association of Collegiate Registrars and Admissions Officers.

== Controversies ==
There are a number of incidents reported in the news that involve use of Knightsbridge University degrees.

In 2000, Coleman Nyathi, an official of the South African province of Mpumalanga, was forced to resign after it was revealed that he had lied about his citizenship and that his academic credentials, including his Knightsbridge University doctoral degree in business administration, were "mail order" distance learning degrees from unaccredited institutions. Officials said that Knightsbridge and other universities where Nyathi had obtained degrees are not accredited in South Africa, so his degrees are useless in the country.

In another incident in 2006, Michael Meegan, the head of the Irish charity ICROSS in Africa, received negative attention when it was revealed that his claimed PhD in medical anthropology was not from an accredited university, but was from Knightsbridge University, described in the press as an institution "which trades from a Danish post office box." The situation was revealed after he was asked to collaborate with Duke University on a proposed grant of $2.5 million from the US National Institutes of Health for a study of home care of HIV/AIDS, but did not disclose the source of his doctoral degree. He was dropped from the grant proposal when Duke learned that he did not hold a recognised degree. In April 2006 Meegan received an Honorary Doctorate in Medicine from the National University of Ireland.

In another incident in 2007, Indiana University-Purdue University Indianapolis (IUPUI) discovered that the university's Chief Engineer and Fire Protection Services Manager, Tom Hulse, had used a bachelor's degree from Knightsbridge to qualify for his job, which he had held since 2001. Interviewed by reporters, Hulse admitted knowing that his degree had no standing in the US. He said: "We know it's not an accredited school. It's not a secret." IUPUI expected to treat the case as an ethics violation.

== See also ==
- Educational accreditation
- Diploma mill
