= Jack Gleeson =

Irish actor (born 1992)

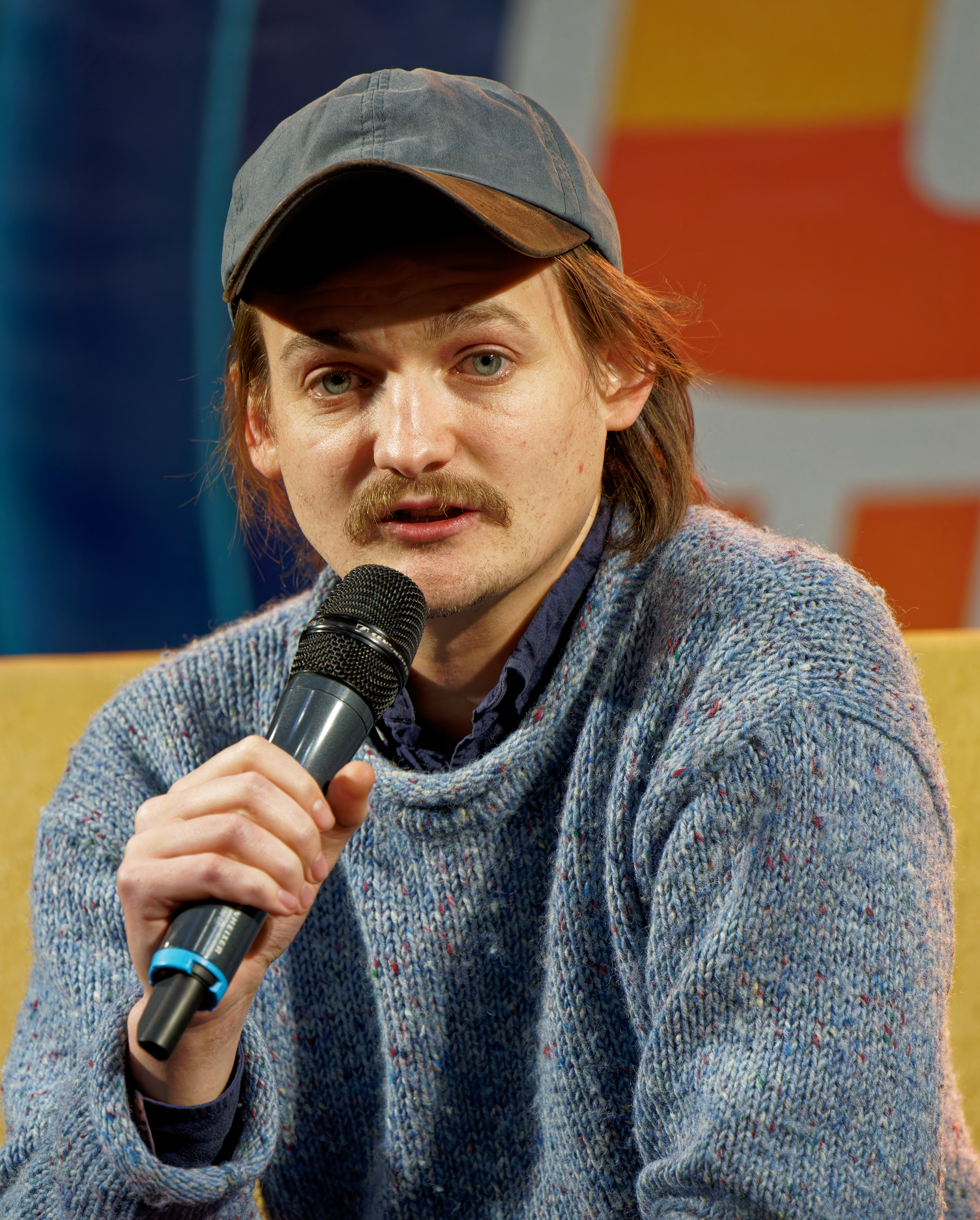
- Gleeson in 2023
- Born: 20 May 1992 (age 34); Cork, Ireland
- Education: Trinity College Dublin
- Occupation: Actor
- Years active: 2002–present
- Spouse: Róisín O'Mahony (m. 2022)

Jack Gleeson (born 20 May 1992) is an Irish actor. He is best known for portraying Joffrey Baratheon in the HBO television series Game of Thrones (2011–2014). Following this role, Gleeson took a six-year hiatus from screen acting. He returned to the screen in 2020 and has since appeared in the Irish film In the Land of Saints and Sinners (2023) and the series The Sandman (2025) and House of Guinness (2025).

== Early life ==
Jack Gleeson was born in Cork, Ireland, and raised in Ranelagh, Dublin, where he attended Gonzaga College. Both of his parents are lawyers. He has two older sisters, Rachel and Emma, who are also involved in Irish theatre. He attended drama classes with them when he was young, and also performed in youth theatre.

Gleeson attended Trinity College Dublin between 2010 and 2015. He studied philosophy and theology and was elected a scholar in 2012. At Trinity, Gleeson was a member of DU Players, where he met his future co-founders of Collapsing Horse Theatre Company.

== Career ==
Gleeson began acting at the age of eight in the Independent Theatre Workshop. His first roles were in films such as Reign of Fire (2002), Batman Begins (2005), Shrooms (2007), and A Shine of Rainbows (2009). In 2010, he played a leading role in the film All Good Children, which was selected for the Directors' Fortnight at the Cannes Film Festival. A reviewer for Variety considered Gleeson "the pic's big discovery".

In 2011, Gleeson starred as Joffrey Baratheon in the HBO fantasy drama Game of Thrones. His performance received critical acclaim, and his character is widely regarded as one of television's best villains. In 2012, Gleeson expressed his intention to step back from professional acting to pursue an academic career once his work on the series was finished. He retired from screen acting in 2014 after concluding his work on Game of Thrones, but stated that while he had been interested in pursuing academia, he had since "gone off that idea". TVLine named Gleeson "Performer of the Week" for his work in the episode "The Lion and the Rose".

Throughout the 2010s, Gleeson was a member of the Dublin-based Collapsing Horse Theatre Company, of which he was a co-founder and producer. He was in the original cast of the company's first production, Monster/Clock, a puppet show that premiered in Dublin in 2012. His next appearance was in "lo-fi comedy", Bears in Space, which premiered in Dublin in July 2014 and was part of the 2014 Edinburgh Festival Fringe. The show received positive reviews and was revived in Dublin and London in 2015, as well as Off-Broadway at 59E59 Theaters in New York in September 2016. In 2017, Collapsing Horse was appointed artistic director of the Cat Laughs comedy festival; Gleeson gave a four-hour performance "as a cat from the 9th-century absurdist poem". Collapsing Horse came to an end in November 2019.

Gleeson made two public appearances in 2019. In June, he was featured in the musical comedy program AMUSICAL at the Cat Laughs festival. Then, in August, he made a surprise appearance at Trinity Brawl 2, a wrestling event in Dublin.

Gleeson returned to the screen in Sara Pascoe's 2020 series Out of Her Mind. In 2023, he appeared alongside Liam Neeson in the film In the Land of Saints and Sinners, and guest-starred in season four of Sex Education and in the BBC adaptation of The Famous Five novels. In 2025, Gleeson reunited with fellow Game of Thrones alum Alfie Allen in the Dutch–Belgian thriller Safe Harbor. He also appeared as Puck / Robin Goodfellow in the second season of the Netflix series The Sandman and as Byron Hedges in the historical drama House of Guinness, which is loosely based on the history of the Guinness family.

== Personal life ==
Gleeson divides his time between London, where he moved in 2015, and Dublin. On 27 August 2022, he married his long-time girlfriend Róisín O'Mahony in a small Catholic ceremony in County Kerry.

Gleeson publicly supported the successful campaign to legalise abortion in Ireland in 2018.

== Acting credits ==
=== Film ===
Year	Title	Role	Notes	Ref.
2002	Reign of Fire	Kid	Uncredited	
2003	Fishtale	Boy with fish	Short film	
2004	Tom Waits Made Me Cry	Young Vincent	Short film	
2004	Shaving the Baby		Short film	
2005	Batman Begins	Little Boy		
2007	Shrooms	Lonely Twin		
2008	We Are Munster		Short film	
2009	A Shine of Rainbows	Seamus		
2010	All Good Children	Dara		
2012	Chat	Adam	Short film	
2012	Electric Burma	Himself	Documentary	
2014	Ringsend		Short film	
2021	Rebecca's Boyfriend	Rory		
2023	In the Land of Saints and Sinners	Kevin Lynch		
2025	With Compliments from the Gentlemen Across the Bar in Oman	Himself	Short film	
2025	Learners	Charlie	Voice, short film	

=== Television ===
Year	Title	Role	Notes	Ref.
2011–2014	Game of Thrones	Joffrey Baratheon	Main role (seasons 1–4)	
2020	Out of Her Mind	Casper	2 episodes	
2023	Sex Education	Dodgy Mo	2 episodes (season 4)	
2023–2024	The Famous Five	Thomas Wentworth	3 episodes	
2025	Safe Harbor	Farrell Walsh	Main role	
2025	The Sandman	Puck / Robin Goodfellow	5 episodes (season 2)	
2025	House of Guinness	Byron Hedges	6 episodes	
TBA	Hercule			

=== Theatre ===
Year	Title	Role	Venue	Notes	Ref.
2002	A Christmas Carol	Tiny Tim	Gate Theatre		
2007	Great Expectations	Young Pip	Gate Theatre		
2007	DNA		Riverbank Arts Centre		
2009	The Giant Blue Hand	Timmy Time	The Ark		
2011	Spurt	Various	Cork Midsummer Festival		
2012	Monster/Clock	Toby	Smock Alley Theatre	Also associate producer	
2013	Distance from the Event	—N/a	Dublin Fringe Festival	Associate producer	
2013	Human Child	—N/a	Smock Alley Theatre	Co-producer	
2014–2016	Bears in Space	Nico/Skin	Project Arts Centre		
2014–2016	Bears in Space	Nico/Skin	Edinburgh Festival Fringe		
2014–2016	Bears in Space	Nico/Skin	Smock Alley Theatre		
2014–2016	Bears in Space	Nico/Skin	Soho Theatre		
2014–2016	Bears in Space	Nico/Skin	59E59 Theaters		
2017	The Water Orchard	—N/a	Project Arts Centre	Dramaturg	
2018	Collapsing Horse Science Fiction Radio Hour	Performer	Set Theatre	Episodes: "Yokespiracy" & "The Irrational Number"	
2018	Collapsing Horse Science Fiction Radio Hour	Performer	The Sugar Club	Episodes: "Yokespiracy" & "The Irrational Number"	
2020–2022	To Be a Machine (Version 1.0)	Mark O'Connell	Dublin Theatre Festival		
2020–2022	To Be a Machine (Version 1.0)	Mark O'Connell	Némo Bienniale Internationale		
2020–2022	To Be a Machine (Version 1.0)	Mark O'Connell	Hong Kong Arts Festival		
2021	The Seagull	Constantine	Galway International Arts Festival		
2023	To Be a Machine (Version 2.0)	Mark O'Connell	Dublin Theatre Festival		
2026	Good Sex		Battersea Arts Centre		

== Accolades ==
Award	Year	Category	Nominee / Work	Result	Ref.
1st Irish Theatre Festival	2016	Special Jury Prize	Bears in Space	Won (Note: Shared with co-stars Eoghan Quinn, Aaron Heffernan, and Cameron Macauley.)	
IGN Awards	2011	Best TV Villain	Game of Thrones	Nominated	
IGN Awards	2012	Best TV Villain	Game of Thrones	Nominated	
IGN Awards	2013	Best TV Villain	Game of Thrones	Nominated	
IGN People's Choice Awards	2012	Best TV Villain	Game of Thrones	Won	
IGN People's Choice Awards	2013	Best TV Villain	Game of Thrones	Won	
Portal Awards	2012	Best Young Actor	Game of Thrones	Nominated	
Russian National Movie Awards	2015	Best Foreign Villain of the Year	Game of Thrones	Nominated	
Saturn Awards	2013	Best Performance by a Younger Actor in a Television Series	Game of Thrones	Nominated	
Scream Awards	2011	Best Ensemble	Game of Thrones	Nominated	
Screen Actors Guild Awards	2011	Outstanding Performance by an Ensemble in a Drama Series	Game of Thrones	Nominated	
Screen Actors Guild Awards	2013	Outstanding Performance by an Ensemble in a Drama Series	Game of Thrones	Nominated	
Young Hollywood Awards	2014	We Love to Hate You	Game of Thrones	Nominated	
