= Notes from an Apocalypse =

2020 non-fiction book by Mark O'Connell

Notes from an Apocalypse: A Personal Journey to the End of the World and Back
- First edition cover (Granta)
- Author: Mark O'Connell
- Audio read by: Mark O'Connell
- Language: English
- Publisher: Granta Books
- Publication date: 16 April 2020
- Media type: Print (hardback and paperback), e-book, audio
- Pages: 272
- ISBN: 978-1-78378-406-6 (hardback)
- OCLC: 1097672923
- Dewey Decimal: 613.6/9
- LC Class: GF86 .O36 2020
- Preceded by: To Be a Machine

Notes from an Apocalypse: A Personal Journey to the End of the World and Back is a 2020 non-fiction book by Irish writer Mark O'Connell, first published by Granta Books.

== Synopsis ==
Notes from an Apocalypse is an investigative book about the anxieties of a potential ecological and social collapse and the movements of survivalism that have followed. Mark O'Connell describes his experiences at the Chernobyl Exclusion Zone, survival bunkers in South Dakota, an apocalyptic retreat in New Zealand, and with the environmentalist group Dark Mountain Project in the Scottish Highlands. He details his communications with doomsday preppers, aspiring space colonists and right-wing conspiracists.

== Reception ==
Publishers Weekly and Kirkus Reviews praised the "wry" humour of O'Connell's writing style, with the Kirkus reviewer concluding by calling it: "A contribution to the doom-and-gloom genre that might actually cheer you up."

James McConnachie of The Times gave the book a rave review, praising O'Connell's humour, sincerity and "bitingly clever" analysis, and it was described by Esquire as "deeply funny and life-affirming, with a warm, generous outlook even on the most challenging of subjects."

Lauren Oyler of The Guardian gave the book a negative review, criticizing its "high-flown language" and narrative style.

The book was also reviewed in The New York Times, The Wall Street Journal, NPR, The Irish Times, Wired and The Observer.
