= Lower Daggons =

Hamlet in Hampshire, England

Coordinates: 50.921527°N 1.8620214°W

- Location within Hampshire
- OS grid reference: SU0979513572
- District: New Forest
- Shire county: Hampshire
- Region: South East
- Country: England
- Sovereign state: United Kingdom
- Post town: FORDINGBRIDGE
- Postcode district: SP6
- Dialling code: 01590
- Police: Hampshire and Isle of Wight
- Fire: Hampshire and Isle of Wight
- Ambulance: South Central
- UK Parliament: New Forest West

Lower Daggons is a hamlet in the New Forest district of Hampshire, England. At the 2011 Census the Post Office affirmed the population was included in the civil parish of Damerham. The hamlet lies close to the Hampshire-Dorset border. It is about 3.5 miles (6 km) from the New Forest National Park.
