= Amy Jephta =

South African playwright, screenwriter and theatre director

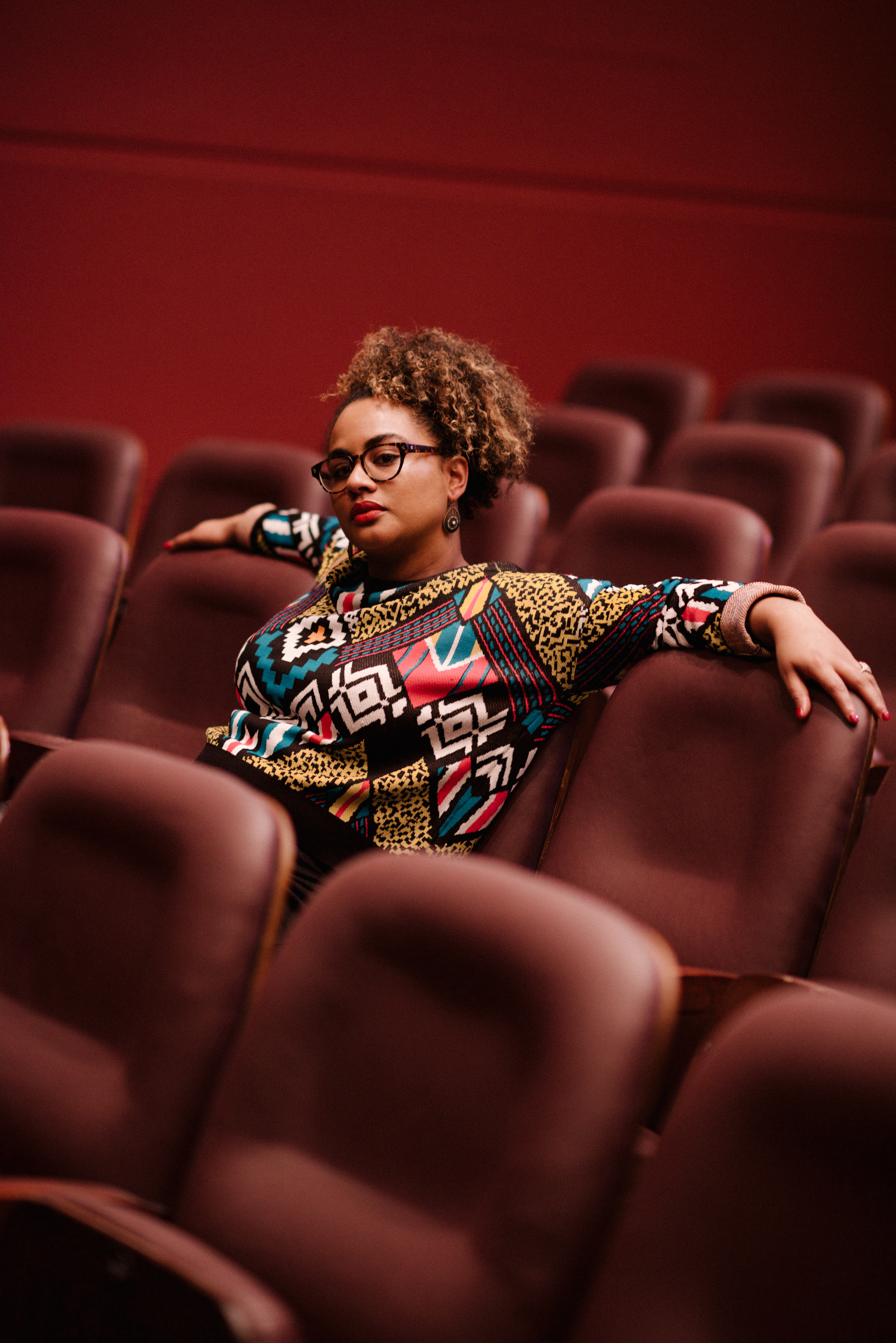
- Born: Cape Town, South Africa
- Education: University of Cape Town
- Writing career
- Notable works: Kristalvlakte, Ellen: The Ellen Pakkies Story, All Who Pass
- Notable awards: Mail & Guardian 200 Young South Africans; Destiny magazine's "Power of 40" list Eugène Marais Prize
- Website: amyjephta.com

Amy Jephta is a South African playwright, screenwriter, theatre director, and teacher.

== Early life and education ==
Amy Jephta is from Mitchells Plain in Cape Town.

She has a BA in theatre and performance (2009) and an MA in theatre and performance (2013) from the University of Cape Town (UCT).

== Career ==
=== Creative career ===
Jephta is a playwright, screenwriter, and theatre director. Her work has been published in South Africa, and performed internationally.

As a new graduate, Jephta won the inaugural Emerging Theatre Director's Bursary, established and run by the Theatre Arts Admin Collective (TAAC) in partnership with the Baxter Theatre Centre and Gordon Institute of Performing and Creative Arts (GIPCA). This enabled her to produce and direct her original work, Kitchen. She had presented a shorter version of the play during her final year at drama school, but it was extended to an hour and ran from 18 to 22 May 2010.

Her works include 'the plays Kristalvlakte and Other People's Lives, and the films Ellen: The Ellen Pakkies Story (2018), Sonskyn Beperk, and While You Weren't Looking.

Her monologue Shoes was performed by James McAvoy and directed by Danny Boyle as part of The Children's Monologues at the Royal Court Theatre in London, and in 2017 at Carnegie Hall in New York City.

As well as the Royal Court, her work has been performed at the Bush Theatre, Jermyn Street Theatre and Theatre503 in London, as part of the Edinburgh Festival in Edinburgh, Scotland, and at the Riksteatern in Stockholm, Sweden.

Jephta was a storyliner and scriptwriter on the drama series Nkululeko, a coming-of-age story set in Khayelitsha, for South Africa's Mzansi Magic Channel. She has also written on Cape Town-based soap opera, Suidooster.

=== Teaching ===
Jeptha has mentored community theatre groups in Kwazulu-Natal, was part of the South African New Plays Writing Programme at the University of the Witwatersrand in Johannesburg, and taught acting and voice at CityVarsity in Cape Town and the Simon Fraser University's School for Contemporary Arts (Woodward's Building) in Vancouver. She was also invited to lecture at the City University of New York.

As of 2024 Jephta is a lecturer at the University of Cape Town, teaching bilingual acting.

== Other activities ==
In 2015, Jephta co-founded the African Women Playwrights Network, a digital networking project funded by the UK Arts and Humanities Research Council for two years.

In 2017–8, she ran a mentorship project for emerging female playwrights at the Baxter Theatre in Cape Town.

She served as chair of Women Playwrights International, an international non-profit that helps to create opportunities and space for women playwrights.

serves on the advisory panel for CASA, an annual award that facilitates connections between women writers in Canada and South Africa

Jephta is co-founder and producer at PaperJet Productions.

== Recognition ==
Jephta was the recipient of the inaugural Baxter Theatre/TAAC Emerging Theatre Director's Bursary in 2010.

She is an alumna of the Lincoln Center Theatre Directors Lab and was one of the Mail & Guardian 200 Young South Africans in 2013.

Jephta won the 2017 Eugène Marais Prize for drama for Krystalvlakte and the 2019 Standard Bank Young Artist award for Theatre

She was listed in Destiny magazine's "Power of 40" list.

She is an alumna of Ron Howard's and Brian Grazer's Imagine Entertainment Impact Lab.

== Plays ==
- This Liquid Earth: A Eulogy in Verse
- Kristalvlakte
- Other People's Lives
- All Who Pass
- Flight Lessons
- Free Falling Bird
- Damage Control
- Kitchen
- Interiors
- Pornography
- A Good House

== Films and television ==
- While You Weren't Looking (co-writer; 2015)
- Sonskyn Beperk (screenwriter; 2016)
- Soldaat (screenwriter/director; short film, 2017)
- Ellen: The Ellen Pakkies Story (screenwriter; 2018)
- Trackers (screenwriter; TV Series 2019)
- Barakat (director; 2020 feature film)
- Catch Me a Killer (screenwriter, TV series, 2024–)

== Publications ==
- Kristalvlakte (Tafelberg Publishers)
- Other People's Lives (Junkets Publishers)
- Contemporary Plays by African Women (editor)
