= Catch Me a Killer (TV series) =

2024 South African true crime TV series

- Genre: True crime
- Written by: Amy Jephta; Sarah Hooper; Jessica Ruston; Oliver Frampton
- Directed by: Rene van Rooyen; Tracey Larcombe; Brett Michael-Innes
- Starring: Charlotte Hope; Donna Cormack-Thomson; Steven John Ward; Vaughn Lucas
- Country of origin: South Africa
- Original language: English
- No. of series: 1
- No. of episodes: 11

Production
- Executive producers: Bob Conte, Wikus du Toit
- Producers: Greig Buckle; James Copp
- Production location: South Africa
- Cinematography: Dino Benedetti, Fahema Hendricks
- Editor: Claire Pringle
- Running time: 60 minutes
- Production companies: Showmax; Night Train Media; CMak (UK); M-Net

Original release
- Network: Showmax
- Release: February 2024

Catch Me a Killer is a 2024 11-part true crime television series set in South Africa, based on cases worked on by forensic psychologist and police investigator Micki Pistorius in the 1990s. It stars British actress Charlotte Hope as Pistorius.

== Premise ==
The series is based on the autobiography of the same name by South African forensic psychologist and police investigator Micki Pistorius, who was instrumental in securing convictions for many serial killers in the late 1990s.

== Cast ==
- Charlotte Hope as Micki Pistorius
- Donna Cormack-Thomson as Erika
- Steven John Ward as Mark
- Vaughn Lucas as AJ Oliver
- Grant Ross as Jannie
- Sean Cameron Michael as Robert Ressler

== Production ==
South African playwright and screenwriter Amy Jephta was lead writer on the series, with other writers being Sarah Hooper, Jessica Ruston, and Oliver Frampton. It is directed by Rene van Rooyen, Tracey Larcombe, and Brett Michael-Innes. Pistorius was a consultant on the series, and also provided emotional support to Hope during filming.

The series was co-produced by the German production company Night Train Media, along with CMak (UK) and M-Net (SA).

Production design was by Warren Gray.

== Release ==
Catch Me a Killer was screened in the International Panorama section of the 2024 edition of Series Mania in Lille, France, having its French premiere on 19 February 2024. It was the first South African series to feature in Series Mania.

The series was released by South African streaming service Showmax in February 2024, and in the UK on Alibi on 5 March 2024. It became available at the same time on free streaming service SBS on Demand in Australia. The series is available in the United States and Canada on BritBox.

== Reception ==
The French film festival Series Mania described Catch Me a Killer as "A female Mindhunter in the guise of a wonderfully-produced true-crime series".

== Awards and nominations ==
The series won "Best Production Design – TV – Light Entertainment & Band 1 Programmes" in the British Film Designers Guild Awards, with production designer Warren Gray, supervising art director Sara Hartinger, and set decorators Anneke Botha and Annicia Bloom named as recipients.
