= Luton Airport (disambiguation) =

Luton Airport is an international airport serving London located in Luton, Bedfordshire, UK.

Luton Airport may also refer to:

- Luton Airport Parkway railway station, the railway station for the above
- Luton Airport (TV series), a British reality TV series which follows staff at the above
- "Luton Airport" (song), by Cats U.K.
