= Cats U.K. =

British all-female band (1979–1980)

Cats U.K. were a British four-piece all-female group who had a hit with the single "Luton Airport" in October 1979.

The record, which reached No. 22 on the UK Singles Chart, was inspired by the 1977 Campari television commercial in which cockney model and actress Lorraine Chase responds to Jeremy Clyde's romantic line "Were you truly wafted here from paradise?" with the reply, "Nahh, Luton Airport!".

The band featured Deena Payne, who coincidentally went on to appear with Chase in the long-running soap opera Emmerdale. The lead singer was Bea Rowley as Lorraine Chase did not want to sing the song. The track was written by Paul Curtis, known amongst UK Eurovision Song Contest fans due to his many and varied attempts at writing the UK entry each year, and John Worsley. The writers approached Jill Shirley about finding suitable singers for the group. Shirley had been involved with the UK heats for Eurovision for a number of years and would go on to form Bucks Fizz, Gem and Bardo.

The group had to rename itself to Cats U.K. because of the existence of the Dutch band the Cats. However, another band from the UK had also existed named the Cats, a reggae band from London. The group went on to record their second single "Holiday Camp" in 1980 with a third single, "16, Looking for Love" ending their singing career.
