= Mark Womack =

British actor (born 1961)

- Born: Mark Edward Womack; 9 January 1961 (age 65); Liverpool, England
- Occupation: Actor
- Years active: 1988–present
- Television: Liverpool 1 Murphy's Law; Sorted; Emmerdale
- Spouses: Mary Therese McGoldrick (m. 1995; div. 1997) Samantha Janus (m. 2009; sep. 2018)
- Children: 3

Mark Edward Womack (born 9 January 1961) is an English actor, known for starring in Liverpool 1, Sorted and Willy Russell's Dancin thru' The Dark. In 2020, he appeared in the ITV soap opera Emmerdale as DI Mark Malone.

== Personal life ==
Womack was born in Liverpool in 1961, eldest son of Frances (née Dean) and Tom Womack. He has a younger brother and sister.

He attended high school in Childwall, Liverpool, and later attended RADA, London.

Womack married Mary Therese McGoldrick in 1995. They had one son together before their 1997 divorce. Womack soon began a relationship with his married Liverpool 1 costar Samantha Janus. Janus's marriage ended in divorce in 1998, and she and Womack married on 16 May 2009. They have two children together. In August 2020, Janus announced that she and Womack had separated in 2018; but were still living together in the same house with their children.

== Filmography ==
=== Film ===
Year	Title	Role	Director	Notes
1990	Dancin' Thru the Dark	Eddie Ainsworth	Mike Ockrent	
1993	A Question of Guilt	Ryan	Stuart Orme	
2010	Route Irish	Fergus	Ken Loach	
2010	I Against I	Joseph Carmichael	Mark Cripps; David J Ellison; James Marquand	
2013	Uwantme2killhim	Marks Dad	Andrew Douglas	
2014	One Night in Istanbul	Tony Fitz	James Marquand	
2016	Between Two Worlds	Joe	James Marquand	
2025	Unforgivable	Paul Patterson	Jimmy McGovern	

=== Television ===
Year	Title	Role	Notes
1988	Piece of Cake	Moke' Miller	
1991	Kinsey	Eddie	
1993	Scene	Danny	Documentary series
1993	Crime Story	Graham Young	
1995	Hearts and Minds	Archie	
1998–1999	Liverpool 1	DC Mark Callaghan	
2000	Playing the Field	Jason Pratt	
2002	Judge John Deed	Mark Powell	
2003–2004	Merseybeat	DI Pete Hammond	
2003	Judge John Deed	Andy Powell Q.C.	
2005	Murphy's Law	David Callard	
2011	The Runaway	Eamonn Docherty	
2012	Good Cop	DCI Craig Costello	Series Regular
2013	Silent Witness	Tom Hancock	Episode: "Legacy"
2014	Babylon	Hopwood	Recurring role
2015	Vera	Billy Reeves	Episode: "Muddy Waters"
2020	Emmerdale	DI Mark Malone	Series regular
2021	Moving On	Ian Keane	Episode: "Wedding Day"
2022	The Responder	Barry	Series regular
2026	Casualty	Colonel Jack Bard	
