= Emma (Welsh singer) =

Emma Booth
- Born: Emma Louise Booth; 2 August 1974 (age 51); Bridgend, Mid Glamorgan, Wales
- Genres: Pop
- Occupation: Singer
- Instrument: Vocals
- Years active: 1990–1991
- Label: Big Wave Records

Emma (born Emma Louise Booth, 2 August 1974) is a Welsh singer who represented the United Kingdom in the Eurovision Song Contest 1990 with "Give a Little Love Back to the World".

This was the third of four entries representing the UK composed by Paul Curtis. The song finished sixth in the Contest, and climbed to No. 33 in the UK Singles Chart. Her backing vocalists at Eurovision 1990 included Sam Blue and Miriam Stockley.

== Biography ==
Emma was born in Bridgend, Wales. At the age of fifteen, she was the youngest singer to have represented the UK in the contest and only narrowly made the newly implemented age rule in the competition, where all contestants must be 16 in the year they compete. The song had an environmental theme. Many of the 1990 entries chose the momentous events taking place across Europe in the previous twelve months and European Unity as their theme. She released one more single in the UK on Big Wave Records. It was 1991's "Dance All Night" which failed to chart.

== Personal life ==
Booth now lives in Seattle, with her husband and children. Her father, John Booth, is an actor and acts alongside Owen Money in yearly pantomimes. Her sisters, Amy and Kristie, now run a dance school in South Wales. The dance school, KLA, featured on series 1 of The Greatest Dancer where they finished in 2nd place.

== Discography ==
=== Singles ===
Year	Single	Peak chart positions	Album
Year	Single	UK	Album
1990	"Give a Little Love Back to the World"	33	Non-album singles
1991	"Dance All Night"	—	Non-album singles
"—" denotes releases that did not chart or were not released.

Awards and achievements
Preceded by Live Report with "Why Do I Always Get it Wrong?"	United Kingdom in the Eurovision Song Contest; 1990	Succeeded by Samantha Janus with "A Message to Your Heart"
