= Liverpool 1 =

Liverpool 1 can refer to:

- Liverpool 1 (TV series) - a 1998 television series following a fictional Merseyside vice squad.
- Liverpool One - shopping centre opened in 2008.
