= Live Report =

British band

- Also known as: Midnight Blue
- Origin: England
- Genres: Pop
- Years active: 1989
- Past members: Ray Caruana; John Beeby; Brian Hodgson; Maggie Jay; Mike Bell; Peter May

Live Report, originally called Midnight Blue, composed of Ray Caruana (vocals), John Beeby, Brian Hodgson, Maggie Jay, Mike Bell (keyboards) and Peter May. Brian Hodgson was a musician, producer and composer and former member of the UK pop group Matchbox, writing many of their 8 hits in the UK.

== Biography ==
They were finalists in the BBC Television's A Song for Europe contest in 1989 with the song, "Why Do I Always Get it Wrong?". The original title of the song had been "No More Sad Songs". It scored 111,996 votes, compared to runner-up Julie C's (a.k.a. Julie Coulson) 51,449 votes. Live Report went on to represent the UK in the Eurovision Song Contest 1989 in Lausanne, where they finished second to the Yugoslav entry, "Rock Me" performed by Riva.

"Why Do I Always Get It Wrong" spent one week in the UK Singles Chart at #73 in May 1989. Since drummer Peter May was requested to play with Cliff Richard in a concert tour, he was replaced by Richard Marcangelo.

Ray Caruana was born in Malta but moved to the UK at the age of 5. He is the son of a professional singer. He was the youngest (aged 12) performer ever to appear at the London Palladium for "Night of a 1,000 Stars". Ray participated in the Maltese heat of the Eurovision Song Contest 1994, and came second with "Scarlet Song".

== See also ==
- United Kingdom in the Eurovision Song Contest 1989

Preceded by Scott Fitzgerald with "Go"	United Kingdom in the Eurovision Song Contest; 1989	Succeeded by Emma with "Give a Little Love Back to the World"
