= Between Two Worlds (2015 film) =

- Directed by: James Marquand
- Written by: Stephen Morris
- Produced by: Pete Gibbons; Stephen Morris
- Starring: Chris Mason; Hannah Britland; Lucien Laviscount; Example
- Cinematography: Stuart White
- Edited by: Steve Shone
- Production company: Formidable
- Distributed by: APL Film
- Release date: October 23, 2015
- Running time: 99 minutes
- Country: United Kingdom
- Languages: English; French

Between Two Worlds is a 2015 British romantic comedy film written by Stephen Morris, directed by James Marquand and starring Chris Mason, Hannah Britland, Lucien Laviscount and Example, the latter credited as Elliot Gleave. It is Example's film debut.

== Cast ==
- Chris Mason as Ryan
- Hannah Britland as Anna
- Example as John
- Lucien Laviscount as Connor

== Release ==
The film was released on October 23, 2015.

== Reception ==
Wendy Ide of The Guardian awarded the film two stars out of five and wrote, "Any film which uses the camera like a giant tongue with which to drool over the cast has no right to a position of moral superiority."

Gloria Daniels-Moss of HeyUGuys.com also awarded the film two stars out five and wrote, "Between Two Worlds seems stuck in the middle of a rut from the word go."
