= One Step Out of Time =

1992 single by Michael Ball

Single by Michael Ball
- Released: 13 April 1992
- Length: 3:00
- Label: Polydor
- Songwriters: Paul Davies; Tony Ryan; Victor Stratton
- Producer: Mike Smith

Michael Ball singles chronology
"It's Still You" (1991)	"One Step Out of Time" (1992)	"If I Can Dream" (1992)

Eurovision Song Contest 1992 entry
- Country: United Kingdom
- Artist: Michael Ball
- Language: English
- Composers: Paul Davies; Tony Ryan; Victor Stratton
- Lyricists: Paul Davies; Tony Ryan; Victor Stratton
- Conductor: Ronnie Hazlehurst

Finals performance
- Final result: 2nd
- Final points: 139

Entry chronology
- ◄ "A Message to Your Heart" (1991)
- "Better the Devil You Know" (1993) ►

"One Step Out of Time", written and composed by Paul Davies, Tony Ryan, and Victor Stratton, was the United Kingdom's entry at the Eurovision Song Contest 1992, performed by English singer, presenter and actor Michael Ball. It ended up as number two in the ESC-finale, behind "Why Me?" by Linda Martin for Ireland. The song was included on Ball's 1992 self-titled debut album as well as the album Past and Present, which was released on 9 March 2009.

== Background ==
=== Composition ===
It is a mid-tempo pop song, relating the singer's comfort with being "one step out of time" in relation to rejecting the reality around him, instead pining after his former lover. Not accepting that his relationship is over, and spurning the disapproval of his friends, he wishes to put "his love on the line" one more time, imploring his former lover to just let him know what he had done wrong.

=== Selection process ===
After the disappointing result Samantha Janus received on behalf of the United Kingdom at Rome 1991, the UK national final, A Song for Europe, was retooled. Reverting to the selection process which decided the entries from 1964 to 1975, a singer was picked internally by the BBC, and the public would vote on which song would go with them to the Eurovision finals. Ball sang eight songs on A Song for Europe 1992, and "One Step Out of Time", performed seventh, emerged as the winner by an overwhelming margin (over 60,000 telephone votes separated the first and second-place finishers).

== At Eurovision ==
At the contest, held in Malmö, the song was performed sixteenth on the night, after Austria's Tony Wegas with "Zusammen geh'n", and before Ireland's Linda Martin with "Why Me?". At the end of voting that evening, "One Step Out of Time", the pre-contest favourite, took the second-place slot with 139 points. Belgium, Austria, Denmark and Germany awarded the UK their 12 points that evening. Despite losing by 16 points to "Why Me?", the UK received more times the 12 points than Ireland (four to three). This would be the third of four second-place finishes the UK had placed between 1988 and 1993.

== Charts ==
Before Eurovision, the song debuted and peaked at No. 20 on the UK Singles Chart, and stayed in the chart for seven weeks.

Chart (1992)	Peak position
UK Singles (OCC)	20
UK Airplay (Music Week)	45
