= Demob (TV series) =

1993 British television series

- DVD cover
- Genre: Comedy drama
- Written by: Dean Lemmon; Andrew Montgomery
- Directed by: Robert Knights
- Starring: Griff Rhys Jones; Martin Clunes; Amanda Redman; Samantha Janus; Les Dawson
- Composer: Peter Martin
- Country of origin: United Kingdom
- Original language: English
- No. of series: 1
- No. of episodes: 6

Production
- Executive producers: Peter Fincham; David Reynolds
- Producer: Adrian Bate
- Running time: 51 minutes (including adverts)
- Production companies: Talkback Productions; Yorkshire Television

Original release
- Network: ITV
- Release: 15 October – 19 November 1993

Demob is a British comedy-drama television series, which screened for one six-episode series in 1993; It was produced by Talkback Productions in association with Yorkshire Television for ITV.

The series is set in the late 1940s and early 1950s, it stars Martin Clunes and Griff Rhys Jones as two ex-army friends who try to form an entertainment act, with the aim of getting work on BBC radio. The series cast also includes Samantha Janus, Amanda Redman and Les Dawson, Dawson having died before it went to air.

== Plot ==
The series follows the ups and downs of two World War II veterans who decide to form a comedy duo after returning home to England. They experience various personal and professional problems as they strive for success.

== Characters ==
=== Lead characters ===
- Ian Deasey (Griff Rhys Jones): A cheerful ex-soldier who struggles to adjust to his dull pre-war life and forms a comedy team with his army pal, Dick Dobson. Ian is known for singing humorous songs.
- Dick Dobson (Martin Clunes): An irresponsible ex-soldier who always gets into scrapes and has to be rescued by Ian. He is an excellent piano player and forms one half of the comedy duo Dobson and Deasey.
- Janet Deasey (Amanda Redman): Ian's beautiful wife who grows dissatisfied with her husband's desire to become a comedian and begins an affair to stave off boredom.
- Hedda Kennedy (Samantha Janus): A beautiful dancer, who is desperately searching for her American husband, believed to be missing in action. She works in various establishments of Rudy Lorimer's as a singer and dancer. She later becomes a film actress. She is good friends with Ian and Dick and lives next door to their London rooms.
- Moreton Stanley (Les Dawson): A corpulent short-tempered comic who makes improper advances to Hedda.
- Rudy Lorimer (James Faulkner): A disreputable businessman who continually ensnares Dick in his shady business ventures. Lorimer is an alias; his real name is not known.

=== Supporting characters ===
- Alan Deasey (Luke Marcel): Ian and Janet's only child, he is a perceptive, sensitive boy vulnerable to teasing. When his father returns from the war he hardly recognises him.
- Annabel (Tilly Blackwood): Janet's best friend, Annabel is engaged to be married to Dr. Pollock.
- Edith (Liz Fraser): Janet's mother who dispenses advice freely.
- Dr. Jeremy Pollock (Harry Burton): Annabel's fiancé who develops an interest in Janet. He has a fondness for Gilbert and Sullivan musicals.
- Oliver Lee (Don Gilet): Hedda's American GI friend who assists her in her search for her missing husband. Oliver plays the saxophone at a London jazz club.
- Frank Parsons: (Tony Melody) Ian's boss at the council.
- Ottie Pond (Roberta Taylor): The producer of "Radio Playtime", a BBC Radio children's programme.
- Keith Koster (Jeremy Child): The notoriously difficult ventriloquist star of "Radio Playtime", Koster seems to believe that his dummy is actually sentient.
- Claudette (Colleen Passard): Dick's wife who he marries only to help her gain entry into the UK. Originally from France, she is a prostitute who works for Rudy Lorimer.
- Moira Stanley (Pat Keen): Moreton Stanley's wife who also serves as his manager.
- Mrs. O'Callagan (Barbara Ashcroft): The duo's Liverpool landlady who takes a shine to Dick much to his horror.
- June (Cinnamon Bone)
- Inspector Wareham (Richard Cubison)
- Camera (John Clegg)
- Ralph (Richard Lintern)
- Roy (Timothy Knightley)
- Walter (Peter J. Morton)

== Episodes ==
No.	Title	Directed by	Written by	Original release date
1	"Episode 1"	Robert Knights	Dean Lemmon & Andrew Montgomery	15 October 1993
Veterans of the African campaign and Army mates Ian Deasey (Griff Rhys Jones) and Dick Dobson (Martin Clunes) are demobilized at the close of World War II. Ian returns to his wife Janet (Amanda Redman) and his young son Alan and his boring pre-war job at the local council. Dick poses as a flight squadron leader so he can live in style at the Allied Officer's Club. He convinces Ian to perform a two man comedy routine with him in Soho.
2	"Episode 2"	Robert Knights	Dean Lemmon & Andrew Montgomery	22 October 1993
Ian is sacked after too many late nights performing as one half of his new comedy partnership. Ian and Dick befriend beautiful dancer Hedda (Samantha Womack) who is looking for her husband. Meanwhile, Dick assists shady businessman Rudy Lormier with his dealings and becomes the manager of The Blue Parrot nightclub.
3	"Episode 3"	Robert Knights	Dean Lemmon & Andrew Montgomery	29 October 1993
Deasey and Dobson get a three-week booking in Liverpool opening for comedy legend Moreton Stanley (Les Dawson). When their routine arouses audience hatred they must enlist Hedda to assist them. Janet grows increasingly frustrated with her husband's absence when Alan comes down with chicken pox.
4	"Episode 4"	Robert Knights	Dean Lemmon & Andrew Montgomery	5 November 1993
Disgusted with his behaviour, Janet kicks her husband out of the house and decides to take a job at the surgery working for Dr. Pollock. Hedda and Ian try to form an act without Dick, but it ends in disaster. An opportunity for Ian and Dick to earn cash by helping Lorimer with a summer camp goes awry when they meet and try to help some fellow veterans.
5	"Episode 5"	Robert Knights	Dean Lemmon & Andrew Montgomery	12 November 1993
Things heat up between Janet and her boss. Ian and Dick find a job working on a BBC Radio children's radio programme opposite a neurotic ventriloquist. While singing in a swanky new nightclub, Hedda receives some devastating news.
6	"Episode 6"	Robert Knights	Dean Lemmon & Andrew Montgomery	19 November 1993
Ian decides to stand by Dick when he discovers a shocking secret and Hedda becomes a film actress. Moreton Stanley offers Ian a job and he and Janet make a decision concerning their marriage.

== Home media ==
Demob was first released on DVD by BFS Entertainment on 10 September 2002. It was re-released by Acorn Media on Region 1 and Region 4 DVD on 26 April 2011.
