= Chris Mason (actor) =

English actor (born 1991)

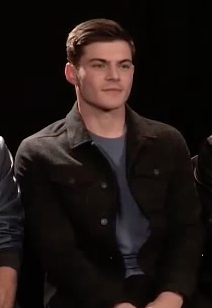
- Mason in 2015
- Born: 14 February 1991 (age 34); Edge Hill, Liverpool, England
- Occupation: Actor
- Years active: 2011–present
- Spouse: Spencer Locke (m. 2017)
- Children: 1

Chris Mason (born 14 February 1991) is an English actor. He is best known for playing Chad Gekko, husband of Veronica Lodge, in the 2021 season of Riverdale. In 2024 he portrayed Keiran Atreides in the series Dune: Prophecy.

== Early life ==
Mason was born on 14 February 1991, in Edge Hill, Liverpool and raised in Broadgreen.

== Career ==
Mason's first major roles were in the main casts of two miniseries, The Fades (2011) and Lightfields (2013). His first film role was in Vampire Academy (2014).

In 2017 Mason appeared in a recurring role, as Leo Humphries, in the third season of Broadchurch.

In 2021 he appeared in the fifth season of Riverdale, portraying Chad Gekko, the manipulative husband – eventually ex-husband – of Veronica Lodge.

As of 2024, he portrays Keiran Atreides in the main cast of the Max series Dune: Prophecy.

== Personal life ==
Mason has been married to American actress Spencer Locke since 2017, together they have a daughter, Monroe (b. 2020).

== Filmography ==
=== Film ===
Year	Title	Role	Notes
2014	Vampire Academy	Ray	
2015	Legend	Ronnie Hart	
2015	Between Two Worlds	Ryan	
2017	Mad Genius	Mason	
2018	The Honor List	Aaron Masey	
2021	O Auto da Boa Mentira	Pierce	

=== Television ===
Year	Title	Role	Notes
2011	Justice	Peter	Episode: "Like Father Like Son"
2011	The Fades	Steve	Miniseries, main cast
2012	Coming Up	Carl Slade	Episode: "Postcode Lottery"
2012	Eggbox	Danny	TV Movie
2013	Lightfields	Nick	Miniseries, main cast
2013	Motive	Cam Radcliffe	Episode: "The One That Got Away"
2014	Our World War	William Hunt	Episode: "Pals"
2017	Broadchurch	Leo Humphries	Recurring role (season 3)
2019	Pretty Little Liars: The Perfectionists	Nolan Hotchkiss	3 episodes
2020	The Resident	Dax Ramsey	Episode: "How Conrad Gets His Groove Back"
2020	Dirty John	Young Dan Broderick	Recurring role (season 2)
2021	Riverdale	Chad Gekko	Recurring role (season 5)
2021	The American Guest	Kermit Roosevelt	Miniseries, main cast
2021	Law & Order: Organized Crime	Luka Hasa	2 episodes
2022	Killing It	Dustin	2 episodes
2022	FBI: Most Wanted	Walker Hawley	Episode: "Iron Pipeline"
2024	Doctor Who	John Lennon	Episode: "The Devil's Chord"
2024	Dune: Prophecy	Keiran Atreides	Main cast
