= Luton Airport (song) =

Single by Cats U.K.
- Released: 1979
- Recorded: 1979
- Genre: Pop
- Label: WEA
- Songwriters: Paul Curtis & John Worsley
- Producer: Dave Dee

"Luton Airport" is a song by the British all-female group Cats U.K. It reached No. 22 on the UK Singles Chart in 1979, and was inspired by the punchline of a 1977 television commercial for Campari featuring Lorraine Chase.

== Production ==
In the 1977 Campari television commercial, model and actress Lorraine Chase is shown being wooed by Jeremy Clyde over drinks. In response to his romantic line "Were you truly wafted here from paradise?" she replies in a strong Cockney accent, "Nahh, Luton Airport!". The humorous punchline became very popular, and in 1979, songwriter Paul Curtis and record producer John Worsley came up with the idea for a song while on holiday in Majorca. Curtis was already well known for writing several UK Eurovision Song Contest entries.

The writers approached Jill Shirley about finding suitable singers for the group. Shirley had been involved with the UK heats for Eurovision for a number of years and would go on to form Bucks Fizz, Gem and Bardo. The song was also offered to Lorraine Chase, but she refused it. Finally it was offered to the UK girl band Cats U.K. The lead singer was Bea Rowley who, as a leading TV dancer, had worked with many of the major choreographers of the 1980s including Geoff Richer, Nigel Lythgoe and Arlene Phillips. The band also included Deena Payne (who coincidentally went on to appear with Chase in the long-running soap opera Emmerdale). Payne, along with two others, supplied the backing vocals. The song was produced by Curtis and Worsley at WEA records.

== Release ==
The song reached number 22 on the UK Singles Chart. In a 2010 interview, Deena Payne incorrectly claimed that the song reached number 9:

In 1978, there was an advert for a girl group called Cats UK. I auditioned as I was in musical theatre and I got the job – it was to sing Luton Airport. Clearly this song was done for Lorraine, she'd said it in a famous advert for Campari. But Lorraine didn't really want to have anything to do with it [because she objected to not being paid for it]. So Cats UK ended up recording it and went to No. 9 in the charts.

Some releases of the record featured a censored version, which bleeped out the line "sod it" from the lyrics. Although released with the same catalogue number (K 18075), this version is easily identifiable due to the word "Bleeped" added above the title on the record label.

Cats UK released two further singles, "Sixteen Looking for Love" and "Holiday Camp" (both 1980), which failed to reach the charts. The group then disbanded.
