= Mad Genius (film) =

- Film poster
- Directed by: Royce Gorsuch
- Written by: Royce Gorsuch
- Starring: Chris Mason; Scott Mechlowicz; Spencer Locke; Faran Tahir
- Distributed by: Film Mode Entertainment
- Release dates: August 2017 (FrightFest); July 3, 2018
- Country: United States
- Language: English

Mad Genius is a 2017 American science fiction film written and directed by Royce Gorsuch and starring Chris Mason, Scott Mechlowicz, Spencer Locke and Faran Tahir. It is Gorsuch's feature directorial debut.

== Cast ==
- Chris Mason as Mason
- Scott Mechlowicz as Finn
- Spencer Locke as Sawyer
- Faran Tahir as Eden

== Release ==
The film was released on VOD on July 3, 2018.

== Reception ==
Adam Keller of Film Threat awarded the film a 4 out of 10.
