= Give a Little Love Back to the World =

1990 single by Emma

Single by Emma
- Released: 1990
- Songwriter: Paul Curtis

Eurovision Song Contest 1990 entry
- Country: United Kingdom
- Artist: Emma Louise Booth
- As: Emma
- Language: English
- Composer: Paul Curtis
- Lyricist: Paul Curtis
- Conductor: Alyn Ainsworth

Finals performance
- Final result: 6th
- Final points: 87

Entry chronology
- ◄ "Why Do I Always Get it Wrong?" (1989)
- "A Message to Your Heart" (1991) ►

"Give a Little Love Back to the World" is a song written by Paul Curtis and performed by Emma. It represented the United Kingdom in the Eurovision Song Contest 1990. At the age of 15, Emma was the youngest-ever entrant on behalf of the United Kingdom at Eurovision.

== Selection process ==
Emma won the right to perform at the contest, held in Zagreb by winning the UK national final, A Song for Europe, where she was the fourth singer to perform. Like in 1988 and 1989, the winner was picked via a nationwide telephone vote, and Emma emerged victorious, receiving nearly three times as many votes as the second-place finisher (clocking in at just under 100,000 supporters).

== At Eurovision ==
In Zagreb, the song was performed seventh on the night, after Luxembourg's Céline Carzo with "Quand je te rêve", and before Iceland's Stjórnin with "Eitt lag enn". At the end of judging that evening, "Give a Little Love Back to the World" took the sixth-place slot with 87 points. Belgium awarded the UK its only 12 points for the evening.

One large theme of Eurovision 1990 in Zagreb was unity and peace, as the contest came mere months after the fall of communism in most of Eastern Europe. Emma's song strayed from this larger theme somewhat in that her song was a plea for environmentalism. Emma, dressed in red, was flanked by five backup singers: three women (in blue dresses) and two men (in alternating white and blue trousers, vests and shirts).

== Charts ==
After Eurovision, the song placed at No. 33 on the UK Singles Chart, in the best chart placing by a UK Eurovision act since 1984.

Chart (1990)	Peak position
Europe (Eurochart Hot 100)	83
UK Singles (Official Charts Company)	33

Preceded by "Why Do I Always Get it Wrong?" by Live Report	United Kingdom in the Eurovision Song Contest; 1990	Succeeded by "A Message To Your Heart" by Samantha Janus
