= Samantha Womack =

English actress, singer, model and director (born 1972)

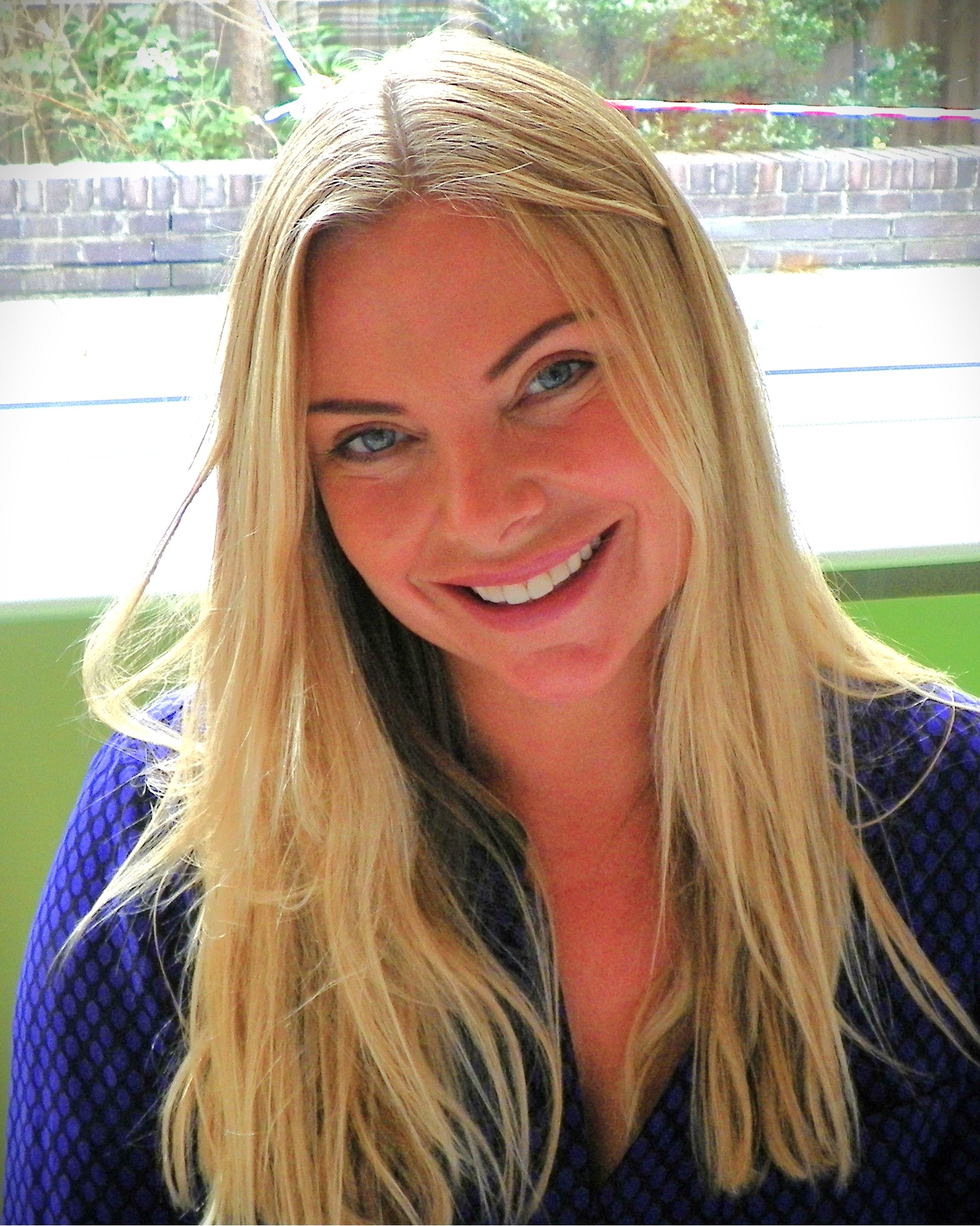
- Womack in 2016
- Born: Samantha Zoe Janus; 2 November 1972 (age 54); Brighton, East Sussex, England
- Education: Sylvia Young Theatre School
- Occupations: Actress; singer; model; director
- Years active: 1989–present
- Known for: Role of Ronnie Mitchell in EastEnders
- Spouses: Mauro Mantovani (m. 1997; div. 1998); Mark Womack (m. 2009; sep. 2018)
- Partner: Oliver Farnworth (2019–present)
- Children: 2
- Relatives: Angie Best (aunt); Calum Best (cousin)
- Musical career
- Genre: Pop
- Instrument: Vocals
- Years active: 1991
- Label: Sony Music Entertainment

Samantha Zoe Womack (née Janus; born 2 November 1972) is an English actress, singer, model and director who has worked in film, television and stage. Womack initially planned a career in singing and she represented the United Kingdom in the Eurovision Song Contest 1991. Her song for the contest, "A Message to Your Heart", was released as her only single in April 1991 and reached number 30 in the UK singles chart.

Womack made her name as a pop singer, and returned to the public eye in the mid-1990s with her role as Mandy Wilkins in Game On (1995–1998), leading on to roles in the BBC One drama Pie in the Sky (1995–1996) and the sitcom Babes in the Wood (1998). She has since become known for playing the role of Ronnie Mitchell in EastEnders (2007–2011, 2013–2017). Her portrayal of Ronnie gained her more prominence and acting roles after some time out of the limelight. She also played Tanya Porter in Sky One comedy-drama Mount Pleasant from 2013 until the final episode in 2017. Womack has also toured across the United Kingdom playing Morticia Addams in the stage musical The Addams Family.

== Early life ==
Womack was born in Brighton. Her singer-songwriter father, Noel Janus (born Janes), left the family when she was six; he went on to be a musician working with bands like Fleetwood Mac. Soon after, her model-actress mother, Diana O'Hanlon, married a doctor, and the family moved to Edinburgh.

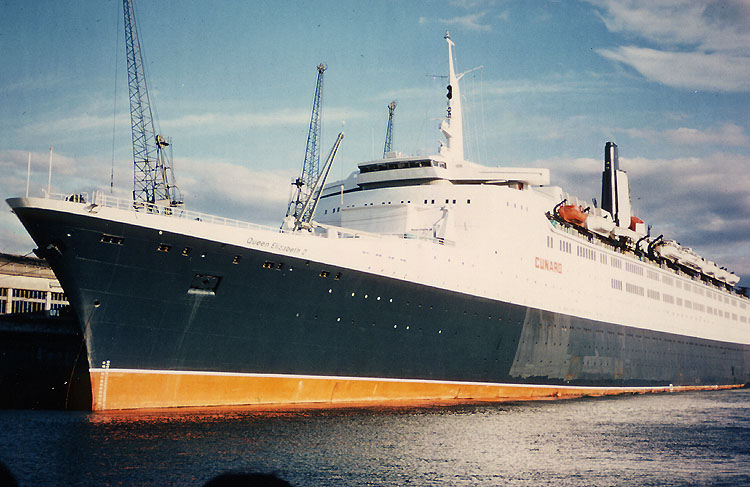
Womack lived on the QE2 (pictured here in 1976).

Womack lived for a time aboard the QE2 with her choreographer grandmother, Sheila Holt (a former actress and choreographer to magician David Nixon for a short time). Womack has a younger half-sister, Zoe. During an appearance on Big Star's Little Star in 2014, it was revealed that she attended the same school as members of All Saints, sisters Nicole and Natalie Appleton, before going to the Sylvia Young Theatre School in London, where she met future EastEnders co-star Danniella Westbrook. At the age of 15, as a self-confessed "wild child", she left home for a life squatting, drinking, smoking and taking drugs.

Womack is the niece of Angie Best, her father's sister and former wife of footballer George Best. Angie's son, Calum Best, is Womack's cousin. As revealed on an episode of Who Do You Think You Are? in 2012, Womack's great-great-grandmother Jessie Ryder was an actress in New York City in the early 20th century.

== Career ==
=== Eurovision Song Contest and early career ===
The actress first came to prominence in March 1991 aged 18, when she won the annual A Song for Europe competition to represent the United Kingdom in the Eurovision Song Contest. She finished joint tenth and the song, "A Message to Your Heart", peaked at number 30 on the UK singles chart. Despite her achievements, her Eurovision entry is frequently remarked upon. She has said regarding the experience that her failure in the contest "devastated" her at the time and thought it would spell the end of her career. She has also called her appearance "ridiculous", in that she was dressed in a pink mini dress while singing about starving children and said the lyrics of the song are "burned into her memory" forever.

Womack developed her first love of acting, appearing in episodes of The Bill and Press Gang; in 1993 she appeared in Demob with Griff Rhys Jones and Martin Clunes; and took to the West End stage, replacing Debbie Gibson as Sandy in Grease.

In 1994 Womack appeared in the comedy-drama crime series Minder. She played Marian Prince, a jazz club chanteuse and friend of Ray Daley in the episode "All Quiet on the West End Front".

From 1994 to 1998 Womack played Mandy in the BBC Two sitcom Game On. She remained on the show until its end in 1998. In between series of Game On, she had a part in the BBC One drama Pie in the Sky from 1995 to 1996 as Nicola Dooley, a waitress.

Womack then appeared in the pilot for The Grimleys with Jack Dee, and the film Up 'n' Under with Neil Morrissey. In 1998 she starred in the ITV1 series Liverpool 1 with her future husband Mark Womack. She then returned to comedy in the sitcom Babes in the Wood co-starring another Sylvia Young Theatre School student, Denise van Outen, it was critically panned despite respectable ratings, and Womack left after the first series.

In 1999, Womack played Cinderella in the ITV Christmas pantomime alongside Harry Hill, Alexander Armstrong, Frank Skinner, Paul Merton, Ronnie Corbett and many more.

A popular choice for photo shoots in men's magazines such as FHM, she came 21st in the FHM 100 Sexiest Women in the World poll in 1998 and 41st in 1999.

=== Smaller roles ===
In 1990, she appeared as a guest in two episodes of the CITV comedy sitcom Spatz; Series 1 Episode 2 and 3. It is rumoured that a possible falling out may have occurred leading to her swift exit from the show after such a brief stint. This is fuelled by her reluctance to admit for many years that she was part of the show.

In 2002 she returned to TV in BBC One drama Strange and she appeared in films The Baby Juice Express, Lighthouse Hill and Dead Man's Cards.

In January 2005 she narrated Jordan & Peter: Laid Bare for ITV2. She later directed an anti-bullying music video for Liverpool band Just 3, entitled Stand Tall. The video starred her and Liverpool F.C. footballer Jamie Carragher. The video was heavily backed by Childline ambassador Esther Rantzen.

In 2006, Womack starred in the BBC One comedy Home Again as Ingrid, and as Miss Adelaide in the West End production of the musical Guys and Dolls at London's Piccadilly Theatre, initially with Patrick Swayze and then Miami Vice star Don Johnson. She reprised the role at the Sunderland Empire opposite Alex Ferns in 2007.

=== EastEnders ===
On 11 May 2007 it was announced that she would be joining EastEnders as Ronnie Mitchell, a cousin of the well known Mitchell brothers. She had previously appeared in the soap in a minor role as a girlfriend of Simon Wicks, played by Nick Berry. During her first stint, Womack's character Ronnie was central to many storylines including the controversial baby-swap story which was aired during 2011. On 6 January 2011, it was announced that she had quit the soap due to her unhappiness with the baby swap storyline. Womack made her final appearance as Ronnie on 7 July 2011 when the character was sent to prison.

Since appearing on EastEnders she has made regular television appearances on Friday Night with Jonathan Ross, The Paul O'Grady Show, Richard & Judy and Loose Women. In November 2007, she sang with EastEnders co-stars in the 2007 Children in Need charity appeal.

In May 2013, it was confirmed that Womack would return to EastEnders as Ronnie Mitchell. Ronnie was later killed-off during the episode broadcast on 1 January 2017, when she was trying to save her sister Roxy Mitchell (Rita Simons) from drowning in a hotel swimming pool, and drowned herself. Her last "appearance" was in the episode broadcast 19 January 2017 when Ronnie was shown as a corpse lying in her coffin. Since Ronnie and Roxy were "killed off", EastEnders fans have continued to campaign for the characters to be resurrected, including sending potential scripts and return plots to the show's bosses.

=== Theatre and continued success ===
In 2011 Womack played the lead role, Ensign Nellie Forbush, a US Navy nurse from Little Rock, Arkansas, in the Lincoln Center production of Rodgers and Hammerstein's musical South Pacific at the Barbican Theatre in London. In March 2013, Womack starred opposite her husband on stage in the world premiere of Hope at the Royal Court Theatre in Liverpool.

From September 2013, Womack played the regular role of Tanya in series three of Sky Living's Mount Pleasant. She continued in this role until the final episode in 2017. Altogether, Womack appeared in 25 episodes as Tanya Dawson (later Porter when the character married).

In 2015, she appeared in the film Kingsman: The Secret Service as lead actor Taron Egerton's character's mother. This was Womack's first main role in such a high-profile film. In 2017 Womack reprised the role in a smaller appearance in Kingsman: The Golden Circle.

In 2017, Womack toured as Morticia Adams in the musical-comedy Addams Family as Morticia around the UK and Ireland. She was announced to reprise the role in 2021 for a tour around UK and Ireland, however she did not reprise the role on tour for unknown reasons. The role of Morticia Addams was instead played by Strictly Come Dancing champion Joanne Clifton

In September 2018, it was announced that she would be playing Fairy Bow Bells in the pantomime Dick Whittington.

Womack appeared in Silent Witness in early 2019. On an episode of Loose Women in February 2019, Womack confirmed that offers had been made to her about a project with co-star and best friend Rita Simons. In response to this, they both said that they would wait for the right one to come along.

From 2021 to 2023, she portrayed the White Witch in the UK touring and West End productions of The Lion, the Witch, and the Wardrobe.

=== Other ventures ===
In January 2011 she appeared as one of the celebrity contestants on the BBC show The Magicians, working with magician Chris Korn. For her "celebrity's choice" trick, she chose being sawn in half by Korn in an illusion called Clearly Impossible. In March 2011 she appeared with Lenny Henry, Angela Rippon and Reggie Yates in the BBC fundraising documentary for Comic Relief called Famous, Rich and in the Slums, where the four celebrities were sent to Kibera in Kenya, Africa's largest slum.

In November 2011, it was reported that Womack was in the running, alongside Dannii Minogue to become a judge on the 2012 series of Britain's Got Talent. However, it was later confirmed that the judging panel for series six would be Simon Cowell, Alesha Dixon, Amanda Holden and David Walliams. Womack has since confirmed that she was offered a place on the judging panel and that she had a meeting with Cowell in Los Angeles. She has said that although she was grateful, she rejected the offer as "it's just not me".

In 2012 Womack appeared in series nine of the BBC's Who Do You Think You Are? The episode revealed her descent on her father's side from two musicians, her great grandfather Alexander Cunningham Ryan, his partner's father Pierre François Odilon Garraud, & Pierre's partner, an actress, Jessie Ryder.

In February 2013, she took part in All Star Family Fortunes, donating money to Comic Relief and ActionAid.

Womack was interviewed on John Bishop: In Conversation With... in November 2017. This episode titled John Bishop: In Conversation With...Samantha Womack included an in depth conversation about her life and career. In February 2020, it was announced that Womack would be taking part in the challenge for Sport Relief. In 2021, she acted alongside Harry Potter actress Jessie Cave in the British sitcom Buffering.

== Personal life ==
In 2007, Womack won "substantial" damages and an apology from the Sunday Sport newspaper over a story headlined "Sam's sex and drugs shame" illustrated with two private topless photographs. She sued the Sport over an article published on 22 July, which claimed she had "coke fuelled threesomes" and took part in a "three-hour drug fuelled lesbian orgy", none of which was true.

In September 2015, it was reported that she was "living in fear" and had alerted the police that she was being stalked. The stalker was given a suspended sentence in December 2015.

=== Relationships ===
From 1997 to 1998 Janus was married to Mauro Mantovani.

Womack began a relationship with Liverpool 1 co-star Mark Womack. They married in 2009 after ten years together. The couple have two children: son Benjamin Thomas Womack (born 2001) and daughter Lili-Rose Womack (born 2005). Mark Womack also has a son, Michael Womack, from a previous marriage. In 2009, Womack took her husband's surname and began to use it professionally. In August 2020, Womack announced that she and Mark had quietly separated in 2018, and were still living together in the same house with their children. Since 2019, Womack has been in a relationship with Coronation Street and Emmerdale actor, Oliver Farnworth.

Womack and her then husband Mark were best friends with Scott Maslen and his wife Estelle Rubio. They have known each other since they were teenagers. Maslen is godfather to Womack's two children, and she is godmother to Maslen's son, Zak. They often go on holiday together with their children, which Womack revealed during an appearance on Friday Night with Jonathan Ross in January 2008. In late 2007 Maslen joined the cast of EastEnders as Jack Branning, who has a relationship with Womack's character, Ronnie. Womack is also best friends with her former EastEnders co-star Rita Simons, who played her sister Roxy Mitchell.

=== Health ===
In April 2008, Womack broke her shoulder when she tripped and fell down the stairs at her home while rushing to get ready for work.

On 8 August 2022, in a post paying tribute to Dame Olivia Newton-John following her death from breast cancer, Womack revealed on Twitter that she had been diagnosed with the disease herself. In December 2022, Womack announced that she was now cancer free.

== Filmography ==
=== Film ===
Year	Title	Role
1993	Mama's Back	Sharon Emmanuel
1995	Call Up the Stars	Zoe Gail
1997	Breeders / Deadly Instincts	Louise
1998	Up 'n' Under	Hazel Scott
2004	Short	Tall Woman
2004	The Baby Juice Express	Trixie
2004	Lighthouse Hill	Jennifer
2006	Dead Man's Cards	Kris
2007	Forgiven	Kate
2014	One Night in Istanbul	Carmella Jones
2015	Kingsman: The Secret Service	Michelle Unwin
2017	Kingsman: The Golden Circle	Michelle Unwin

=== Television ===
Year	Title	Role	Notes
1990	Jekyll & Hyde	Young Maid (Margaret)	
1990	Spatz	Antonia "Toni" Gordon	
1991	The Bill	Secretary	
1992	The Bill	Annie Carlisle	
1991	Wogan	Herself	Performing "A Message to Your Heart"
1991	Top of the Pops	Herself	Performing "A Message to Your Heart"
1991	Eurovision Song Contest 1991	Herself	United Kingdom's entry; 10th place
1991	El C.I.D.	Waitress	
1991	Press Gang	Waitress	
1991	A Murder of Quality	Alice Lawry	
1992	Starting Out	Trixie	
1993	Demob	Hedda	6 episodes; series regular
1993	Health and Efficiency	Charmaine	
1994	Minder	Marian	
1995	That's Showbusiness	Herself	Panelist
1995	Shooting Stars	Herself	Panelist
1995–1996	Pie in the Sky	Nicola Dooley	22 episodes; series regular
1995–1998	Game On	Mandy Wilkins	18 episodes; main role
1996	Sharman	Jane	
1997	The Grimleys	Geraldine Titley	
1997	The Generation Game	Herself	Contestant
1997–1998	This Is Your Life	Herself	
1997–1998	Noel's House Party	Herself	Guest
1998	Imogen's Face	Imogen	3 episodes; lead role
1998	Babes in the Wood	Ruth Froud	7 episodes; main role
1998	Liverpool 1	DC Isobel de Pauli	12 episodes; lead role
2000	Cinderella	Cinderella	
2002–2003	Strange	Jude Atkins	7 episodes, lead role
2002	Judge John Deed	Mel Powell	
2003	Undercover Sex	Jake	
2005	The Afternoon Play	Emma Priestley	Episode: "The Hitch"
2006	Home Again	Ingrid	Main role
2006	Where the Heart Is	Marla	Episode: "Home Grown"
2007	Wild at Heart	Tessa	Episode: #2.2
2007–2011, 2013–2017	EastEnders	Ronnie Mitchell	Series regular; 777 episodes
2013–2017	Mount Pleasant	Tanya Porter/Dawson	Series regular; 25 episodes
2019	Silent Witness	DI Kate Ashton	2 episodes
2021	Buffering	Steph	Episode: #1.1
2025	The Marlow Murder Club	Caroline Wingrove	2 episodes

== Theatre credits ==
Year	Title	Role	Notes
1994–1995	Grease	Sandy	Dominion Theatre, West End
2007	Guys and Dolls	Miss Adelaide	Piccadilly Theatre, West End
2011	South Pacific	Ensign Nellie Forbush	Barbican Centre, London
2013	Hope	Hope	Royal Court Theatre, Liverpool
2013–2014	Jack and the Beanstalk	Spirit of the Beans	Marlowe Theatre, Canterbury
2014–2015	Dick Whittington	Alice Fitzwarren	Sheffield Lyceum
2016–2017	Dick Whittington	Alice Fitzwarren	Milton Keynes Theatre
2017	The Addams Family	Morticia Addams	UK Tour
2017–2018	Snow White and the Seven Dwarfs	Wicked Queen	New Theatre, Cardiff
2018–2019	Dick Whittington	Fairy Bowbells	Theatre Royal, Plymouth
2019	The Girl on the Train	Rachel Watson	UK tour & Duke of York's Theatre, West End
2019–2020	Cinderella	Fairy Godmother	New Wimbledon Theatre
2021–2023	The Lion, The Witch, and the Wardrobe	The White Witch	UK Tour & Gillian Lynne Theatre, West End
2023	42nd Street	Dorothy Brock	UK tour
2023-2024	Jack and the Beanstalk	Mrs Blunderbore	Birmingham Hippodrome
2024-2025	Cinderella	Fairy Godmother	The Alban Arena, St Alban’s
2025-2026	Dear England	Pippa Grange	National Theatre UK tour
2026-2027	By Royal Appointment	The Dresser	UK Tour

== Discography ==
- May 1991 "A Message to Your Heart" / "Heaven is a Place for Heroes" (Hollywood Records), UK singles chart No. 30

== Awards and nominations ==
Year	Award	Category	Result	Ref
2008	All About Soap Awards	Fatal Attraction (with Scott Maslen)	Nominated	
2008	The British Soap Awards	Best On-Screen Partnership (with Rita Simons)	Nominated	
2008	The British Soap Awards	Sexiest Female	Nominated	
2008	Digital Spy Soap Awards	Best On-Screen Partnership (with Rita Simons)	Won	
2008	TV Now Awards	Favourite Newcomer (with Rita Simons)	Won	
2009	British Soap Awards	Best Actress	Nominated	
2009	TV Quick and TV Choice Awards	Best Soap Actress	Shortlisted	
2010	All About Soap Awards	I'm A Survivor	Nominated	
2010	British Soap Awards	Sexiest Female	Nominated	
2010	Inside Soap Awards	Sexiest Female	Shortlisted	
2010	TV Now Awards	Favourite Soap Family	Nominated	
2011	All About Soap Awards	Best Drama (with Jessie Wallace)	Won	
2011	British Soap Awards	Sexiest Female	Nominated	
2015	All About Soap Awards	Best Soap Moment	Nominated	
2017	Inside Soap Awards	Best Exit (with Rita Simons)	Shortlisted	
2017	Inside Soap Awards	Show Stopper (with Rita Simons)	Shortlisted	

Awards and achievements
Preceded by Emma with "Give a Little Love Back to the World"	United Kingdom in the Eurovision Song Contest; 1991	Succeeded by Michael Ball with "One Step Out of Time"
