= Hannah Britland =

British actress (born 1990)

- Born: 2 February 1990 (age 36); Preston, Lancashire, England
- Occupation: Actress
- Years active: 2012-2018

Hannah Britland (born 2 February 1990) is a British actress and model.

== Career ==
In 2013, Britland played Charlie, the girlfriend of a drug dealer who ends up having a brief relationship with James Cook (Jack O'Connell) in two episodes of Skins. She also appeared in the third series of Fresh Meat where she played Sam, a young woman to whom both JP (Jack Whitehall) and Kingsley (Joe Thomas) are attracted.

That same year she got a small role as a BOAC stewardess in the movie Rush.

In 2014, she appeared in the Australian soap opera Home and Away.

== Filmography ==
=== Film ===
| Year | Title | Role | Notes |
|---|---|---|---|
| 2013 | Rush | BOAC Stewardess | |
| 2015 | Between Two Worlds | Anna | |

=== Television ===
| Year | Title | Role | Notes |
|---|---|---|---|
| 2011 | Misfits | Emma | 1 episode |
| 2012 | Vera | Hannah Lister | 1 episode |
| 2012 | Uncle | Gwen | 1 episode |
| 2013 | Skins | Charlie | 2 episodes |
| 2013 | Big Bad World | Chugger | 1 episode |
| 2013 | Fresh Meat | Sam | 7 episodes |
| 2013 | Home and Away | Linda Somerset | 5 episodes |
| 2014 | Our World War | Lizzie | 1 episode |
| 2014–2018 | Lovesick | Abigail | 11 episodes |
| 2015 | A Gert Lush Christmas | Lisa | |
| 2015 | Death in Paradise | Zoe Mackay | 1 episode |
| 2018 | Innocent | Melissa Wilson | |
