= Home Again (TV series) =

British television series

Home Again was a British television sitcom produced by the BBC and broadcast on BBC One in 2006. It starred Peter Egan, Samantha Janus, Bruce Mackinnon and Sinéad Cusack as two couples of different generations living in one house.

The show lasted for one series only, during which six episodes were produced and broadcast. The theme song was Inbetween Days by The Cure.
