= Michael Ball (album) =

Studio album by Michael Ball
- Released: 1992
- Genre: Pop
- Label: Polydor
- Producer: Andrew Lloyd Webber; Mike Smith

Michael Ball chronology
Michael Ball (1992)	West Side Story (1993)

Michael Ball is the debut album by English singer Michael Ball. It was released in 1992 by Polydor Records and peaked at number one on the UK Albums Chart. The album includes the UK Top 40 singles "Love Changes Everything", from the musical Aspects of Love, and "One Step Out of Time", which was the United Kingdom's entry at the Eurovision Song Contest 1992, held in Malmö, Sweden.

== Track listing ==
1. "One Step Out of Time" (Paul Davies, Tony Ryan)
2. "It's Still You" (Darin Black, Richard Kerr)
3. "Holland Park" (Kerr)
4. "Secret of Love" (Ian Allen)
5. "As Dreams Go By" (Andy Hill, Peter Sinfield)
6. "Who Needs to Know"
7. "Simple Affair of the Heart" (Guy Fletcher, Doug Flett)
8. "If You Need Another Love" (John Miles)
9. "Beautiful Heartache"
10. "No One Cries Anymore" (Black, Kerr)
11. "Love Changes Everything" (Don Black, Andrew Lloyd Webber, Charles Hart)

== Personnel ==
- Dave Arch – arranger
- Martin Levan – engineer
- John Mackswith – engineer
- Paul Mortimer - assistant engineer

== Charts and certifications ==
=== Weekly charts ===
Chart (1992)	Peak position
UK Albums (OCC)	1

=== Certifications ===
Region	Certification	Certified units/sales
United Kingdom (BPI)	Gold	100,000^{^}
^{^} Shipments figures based on certification alone.
