= A Gert Lush Christmas =

2015 television film

- Genre: Comedy drama
- Written by: Russell Howard; Steve Williams
- Directed by: Al Campbell
- Starring: Russell Howard; Kerry Howard; Neil Morrissey; Sophie Thompson; Greg Davies; Hannah Britland; Dougie McMeekin
- Country of origin: United Kingdom
- Original language: English

Production
- Producer: Mark Iddon
- Running time: 60 minutes
- Production company: Avalon Television

Original release
- Network: BBC Two
- Release: 26 December 2015

A Gert Lush Christmas is a British one-off comedy-drama film first broadcast on BBC Two on 26 December 2015. It was co-written by Russell Howard and Steve Williams, and features Howard in his acting debut. The programme also stars Kerry Howard (Russell's real life sister), Neil Morrissey, Sophie Thompson, Hannah Britland and Greg Davies.

== Plot ==
The story centres around everyman Dan Colman (Russell Howard) who lives in London with his girlfriend Lisa (Hannah Britland). For Christmas, Dan takes Lisa to his home-town of Bamford in Bristol to meet his caring but dysfunctional family which includes his fitness-obsessed father Dave (Neil Morrissey), well-meaning but eccentric mother Sue (Sophie Thompson), charm offensive brother Jake (Dougie McMeekin), hairdresser sister Julie (Kerry Howard) and party animal Uncle Tony (Greg Davies).

What begins as over enthusiasm to welcome Lisa into the family ends with Lisa running away and making Dan regret having introduced her to them in the first place. The family then pull together in their own unstable but unique way to amend the mistakes that have been made.

== Cast ==
- Russell Howard as Dan Colman
  - Nathan Stone as young Dan
- Hannah Britland as Lisa, Dan's girlfriend
- Neil Morrissey as Dave, Dan's father
- Sophie Thompson as Sue, Dan's mother
- Kerry Howard as Julie, Dan's sister
- Felix Hayes as Trevor, Julie's husband
- Samuel Woodward as Bert, Julie and Trevor's son
- Douggie McMeekin as Jake, Dan's brother
- Maggie O'Neill as Aunty Jade
- Greg Davies as Uncle Tony
- Rosie Ede as Aunty Claire
- Pamela Lyne as Nan, Dan's paternal grandmother
- Sam Pamphillon as Mark, Dan's oldest friend
- Paddy Navin as Deirdre
- Maggie Daniels as Cath
- Larrington Walker as Roger, Dan and Lisa's neighbour
- Alun Cochrane as the barman
- Rose Johnson as the ticket woman
- Gabriel Vick as Wiggy
- Jayde Adams as Kelly
- Keith Chegwin as himself
- Pat Sharp as himself

== Production ==
A Gert Lush Christmas was confirmed in April 2015 and filming took place in May 2015.
