= Dead Man's Cards =

2006 British film by James Marquand

- Directed by: James Marquand
- Written by: James McMartin and James Marquand
- Produced by: Phil Evers [Steve Corless; Mathew Whyte
- Starring: Paul Barber; Robin John Barlow; Tom Bell; Reg Edwards; Lisa Parry
- Cinematography: Mathew Whyt]
- Edited by: Sigvaldi J. Karason
- Music by: Bernd West
- Distributed by: Showbox Media Group
- Release date: 15 December 2006
- Running time: 110 minutes
- Country: United Kingdom
- Language: English

Dead Man's Cards is a 2006 British underworld drama starring Paul Barber and James McMartin.

== Plot ==
When Tom, James McMartin, suffers a bad eye injury his boxing career comes to an end, and his marriage begins to suffer. After a chance encounter at the gym, Tom is offered a job working as a door man for the same run-down night club as Paul (Paul Barber), a tough-looking man who likes to use his knuckle duster.

Paul is a volatile man with a history of violence. After learning of Tom's background in boxing he takes him under his wing to teach him the ways of being a door man. Tom soon falls in love with the barmaid for the club and his loyalties are put to the ultimate test as Paul gets increasingly more in trouble with violent gangsters from the area.

== Home media ==
Dead Man's Cards was released on DVD in Australia by Flashback Entertainment, Cat. No. 23995.
