= A Message to Your Heart =

Single by Samantha Womack

Single by Samantha Janus
- B-side: "Heaven is a Place for Heroes"
- Released: 29 April 1991
- Genre: Pop
- Length: 3:00
- Label: Sony Music Entertainment
- Songwriter: Paul Curtis

Eurovision Song Contest 1991 entry
- Country: United Kingdom
- Artist: Samantha Janus
- Language: English
- Composer: Paul Curtis
- Conductor: Ronnie Hazlehurst

Finals performance
- Final result: 10th
- Final points: 47

Entry chronology
- ◄ "Give a Little Love Back to the World" (1990)
- "One Step Out of Time" (1992) ►

Official performance video
- "A Message to Your Heart" on YouTube

"A Message to Your Heart", is a song written by Paul Curtis and performed by Samantha Janus. It represented the United Kingdom at the Eurovision Song Contest 1991. It finished in 10th place with 47 points. Paul Curtis had also penned the previous year's entry, "Give a Little Love Back to the World".

Janus went on to become a successful actress, starring in the sitcom Game On and the soap EastEnders. Despite her achievements, her entry into the Eurovision is frequently remarked upon. She has said regarding the experience that her failure in the contest devastated her at the time and thought it would spell the end of her career. She has also called her appearance "ridiculous", in that she was dressed in a pink mini-dress while singing about starving children and says the lyrics of the song are burned into her memory forever.

== Background ==
=== Composition ===
Like the previous year, composer Paul Curtis submitted a topical entry for consideration; this time, the subjects were the less fortunate, suffering from poverty and starvation. Janus sung of the contrasts between the people who "are hungry just from being born", and the people who have too much, with "their only hunger being greed". The "message to [the] heart" refers to Janus imploring the better-off to, at the very least, say a prayer for the less fortunate, ending with the well-known John Bradford quotation, "There but for the grace of God, go I". The melody of the song is up-tempo.

=== Selection process ===
Janus won the right to perform at the contest, held in Rome in March 1991, by winning the UK national final, A Song for Europe, where she was the third singer to perform. As in the previous three years, the winner was picked via a nationwide telephone vote. Janus won over second-place finisher Brendan Faye by only 13,000 votes, in the slimmest margin since the telephone vote was introduced.

== At Eurovision ==
On the night of the contest, Janus was dressed in a pink mini-dress, flanked by three women (Zoe Picot, Lucy Moorby, and Nikki Belsher) in white mini-dresses. She was also joined by two other "ghost" backing singers, masked by a music stand at the back of the stage: Kit Rolfe, who had competed for the UK before in 1984 with the song "Love Games" (which, it was claimed, had also used "ghost" singers offstage), and Hazell Dean, who had worked extensively with Stock Aitken Waterman in the eighties.

In Rome, the song was performed twentieth on the night, after Spain's "Bailar pegados" by Sergio Dalma, and before Cyprus "SOS" by Elena Patroklou. At the end of judging that evening, "A Message to Your Heart" took the tenth-place slot with 47 points. It was the worst showing for the United Kingdom since 1987, and resulted in the 1992 Song for Europe being retooled as far as telephone voting was concerned.

== Charts ==
Following Eurovision, the song placed at No. 30 on the UK singles chart, and was in the chart for 3 weeks.

Chart (1991)	Peak position
UK Singles (OCC)	30
UK Airplay (Music Week)	49
