= James Marquand =

British film director

- Born: James Elwyn Marquand; 21 September 1964 (age 62); Hammersmith, London, England
- Occupation: Filmmaker
- Father: Richard Marquand
- Relatives: David Marquand (paternal uncle); Hilary Marquand (paternal grandfather); Elwyn Jones, Baron Elwyn-Jones (maternal grandfather); Pearl Binder (maternal grandmother)

James Elwyn Marquand (born 21 September 1964) is a British film editor and director. He was born in Hammersmith, West London, the son of Welsh director Richard Marquand (Jagged Edge, Return of the Jedi), and his first wife Josephine Elwyn-Jones, an English screenwriter. His paternal uncle David Marquand, paternal grandfather Hilary Marquand, and maternal grandfather Elwyn Jones were all Welsh Labour Party MPs, and his maternal grandmother Pearl Binder, who was of Russian-Jewish descent, was an author and illustrator. As a child, much of his time was spent on film sets observing his father. Later, he was an editor on his father's final film Hearts of Fire. His first short film, The Lesson (1998), was nominated for a BAFTA Kodak Award. He moved on to feature films when he wrote, directed, and produced his first film, Dead Man's Cards (2006).

== Filmography ==
Marquand worked on the following films:

Year	Film	Director	Producer	Writer	Notes
1999	The Lesson	Yes	No	Yes	Short films
2002	The Complaint	Yes	No	No	Short films
2003	Run Piglet Run	Yes	No	No	Short films
2006	Dead Man's Cards	Yes	Yes	Yes	Directorial feature debut
2006	Splinter	No	No	Yes	
2010	Gnarr	No	Associate	No	Documentary film
2011	Subculture	No	Yes	No	Short film
2012	I Against I	Yes	Yes	No	
2014	One Night in Istanbul	Yes	No	No	
2015	Pacific Warriors	Yes	No	Yes	Documentary film
2016	Between Two Worlds	Yes	No	No	
2017	Beautiful Devils	Yes	No	No	
2024	The Partisan	Yes	No	Yes	

== See also ==
- Richard Marquand (father)
- David Marquand (uncle)
- Hilary Marquand (grandfather)
- Elwyn Jones, Baron Elwyn-Jones (grandfather)
- Pearl Binder (grandmother)
