= Luton Airport =

International airport in Bedfordshire, England

London Luton Airport

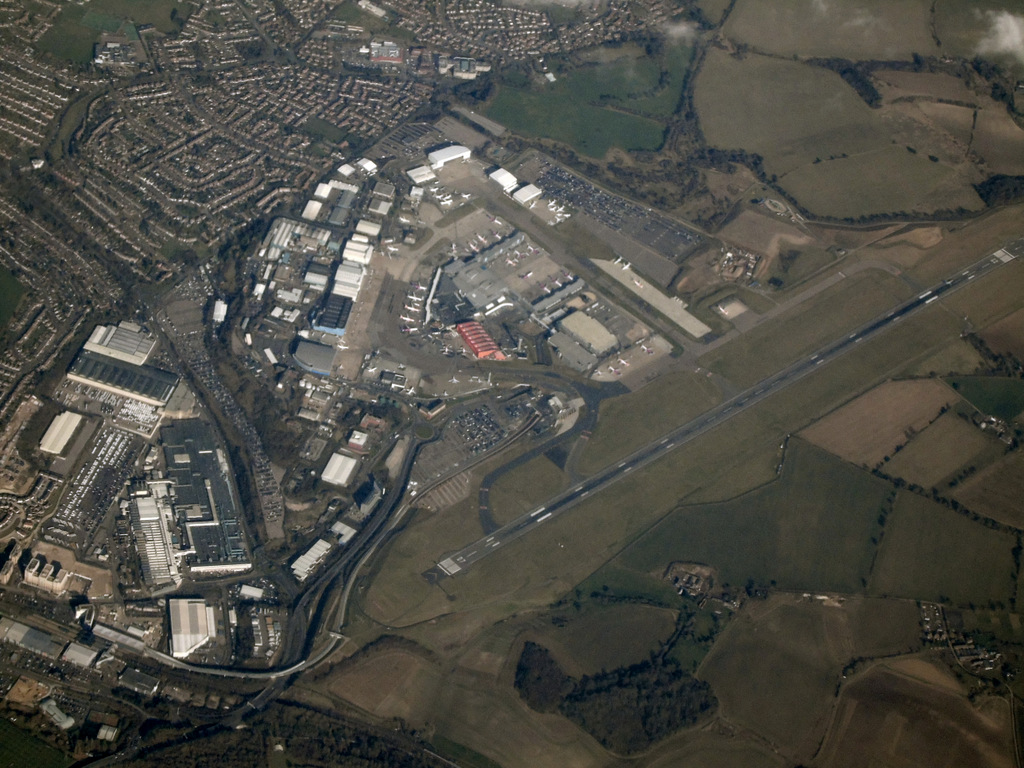
- IATA: LTN; ICAO: EGGW

Summary
- Airport type: Public
- Owner: London Luton Airport Limited (Note: Trading as Luton Rising since 2021.)
- Operator: London Luton Airport Operations Limited (Aena 51%, AMP Capital 49%)
- Serves: London
- Location: Luton, Bedfordshire, England
- Opened: 16 July 1938; 88 years ago
- Operating base for: easyJet UK; Jet2.com; Ryanair UK; Wizz Air UK
- Elevation AMSL: 160 m (520 ft)
- Coordinates: 51°52′29″N 000°22′06″W
- Website: london-luton.co.uk

Maps
- Location in Bedfordshire LTN/EGGW (England) LTN/EGGW (the United Kingdom)
- Zoomable map of airport and environs

Runways
Direction	Length		Surface
Direction	m	ft	Surface
07/25	2,162	7,093	Asphalt

Statistics (2022)
- Passengers: 13,324,491
- Passenger change 21/22: ▲185%
- Aircraft movements: 87,783
- Movements change 21/22: ▲111%
- "2010 to 2017 Statistics". London Luton Airport.

London Luton Airport (IATA: LTN, ICAO: EGGW) is an international airport in Luton, Bedfordshire, England. It is 1.7 miles (2.7 km) east of the town centre and is the fourth-busiest airport serving London. The airport is owned by London Luton Airport Limited, a company wholly owned by Luton Borough Council, and is operated by London Luton Airport Operations Limited (LLAOL).

An airport was opened on the site on 16 July 1938. During the Second World War, the airport was used by fighters of the Royal Air Force. Commercial activity and general aviation flight training at Luton resumed during 1952. By the 1960s, Luton Airport was playing a key role in the development of the package holiday business; by 1969, a fifth of all holiday flights from the UK departed from Luton Airport. From the mid-1960s, executive aircraft have been based at the airport. During the late 1970s, an expansion plan was initiated at Luton to accommodate as many as five million passengers per year, although the airport experienced a reduction in passenger numbers in the 1980s. In 1990, the airport was renamed London Luton Airport to emphasise its proximity to the capital.

The arrival of new operators at Luton during the 1990s, such as charter operator MyTravel Group and new low-cost scheduled flights from Debonair and EasyJet, contributed to a rapid increase in passenger numbers that made it the fastest growing major airport in the UK. In August 1997, to fund an £80 million extension of the airport, a 30-year concession contract was issued to a public-private partnership consortium, London Luton Airport Operations Limited. Throughout the 1990s, £30 million was invested in Luton's infrastructure and facilities. In November 1999, a new £40 million terminal was opened by Queen Elizabeth II and Prince Philip, Duke of Edinburgh; the new building houses 60 check-in desks, baggage and flight information systems, and a range of commercial outlets. During 2004/5, the departure and arrival lounges and other facilities were redeveloped for £38 million.

In 2018, over 16.5 million passengers passed through the airport, a record total for Luton, making it the fifth busiest in the UK. It is the fourth-largest airport serving the London area after Heathrow, Gatwick and Stansted, and is one of its six international airports along with London City and Southend. The airport serves as a base for easyJet, Ryanair and Wizz Air; and was previously a base for TUI Airways, until the airline closed its base at the airport and moved its Luton-based aircraft to Gatwick Airport in 2026. The airport also previously served as a base for Monarch Airlines, until it ceased operations in October 2017. The vast majority of the routes served are within Europe, although there are some charter and scheduled routes to destinations in Northern Africa and Asia.

== History ==
=== Early history ===
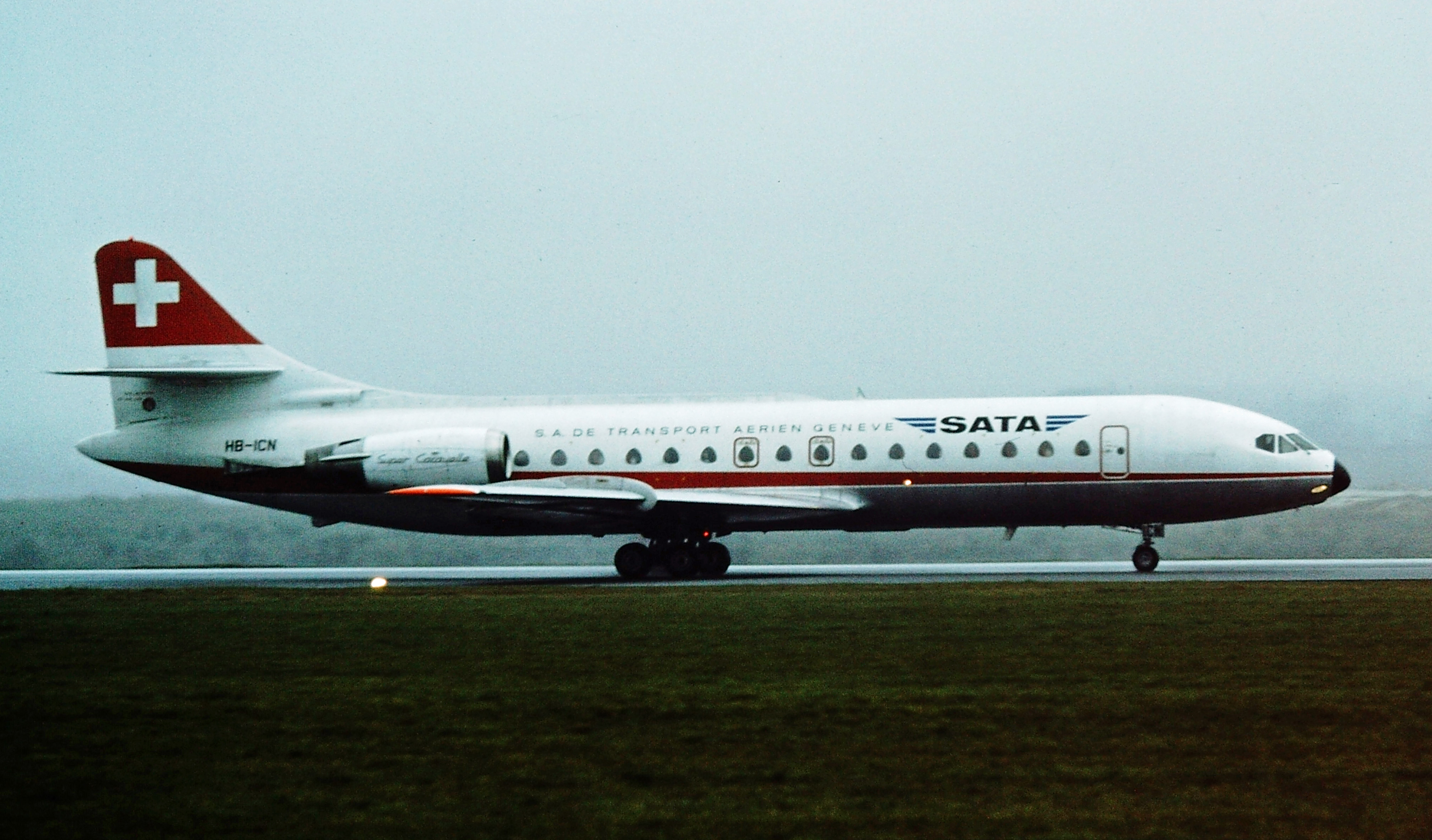
A Sud-Aviation Caravelle at Luton Airport in 1978

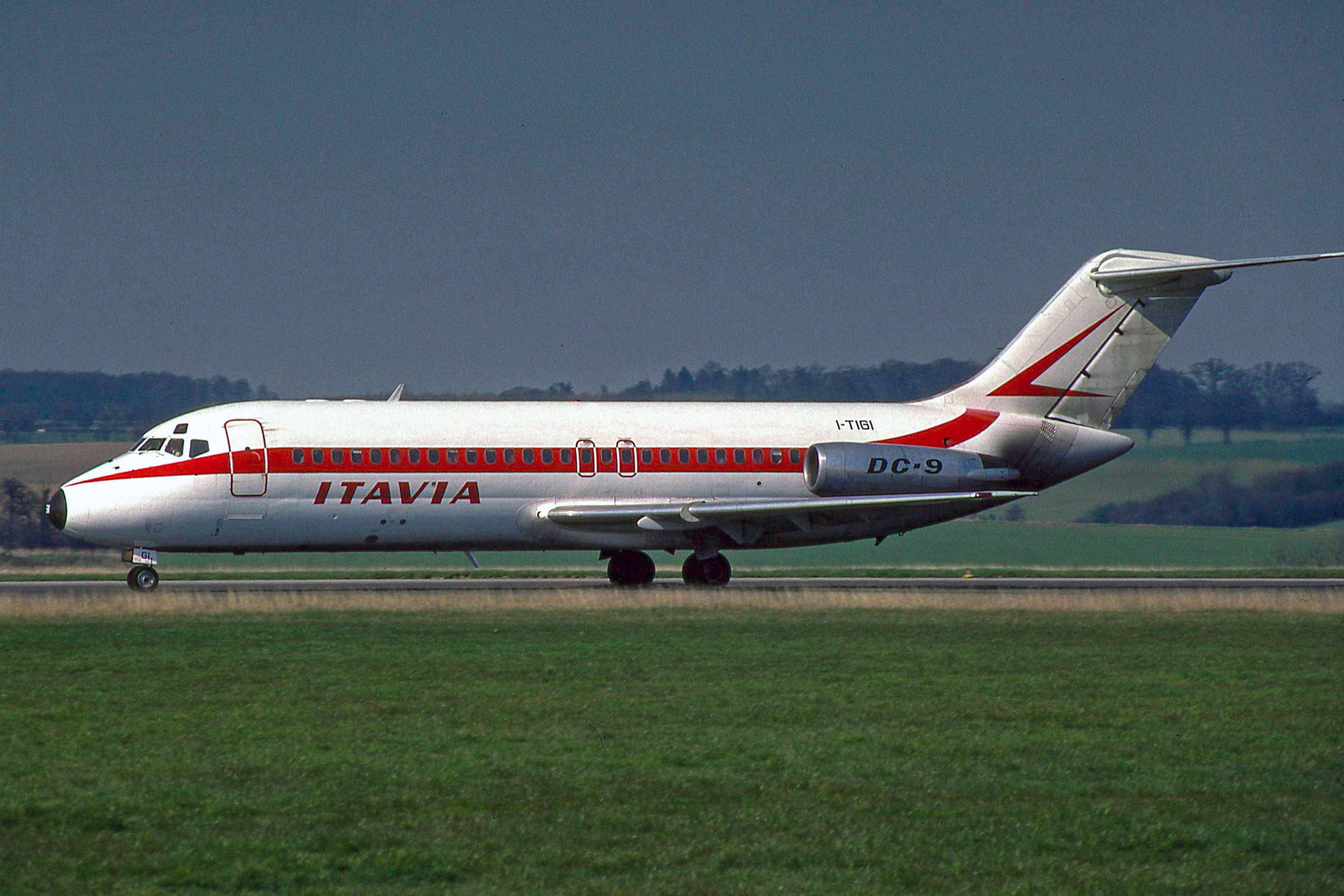
An Itavia Douglas DC-9 at Luton Airport in 1980

Luton Municipal Airport was opened on the site on 16 July 1938 by the Secretary of State for Air, Kingsley Wood. Situated where the valley of the River Lea cuts its way through the north-east end of the Chiltern Hills, the airport occupies a hill-top location, with a roughly 40 m (130 ft) drop-off at the western end of the runway. The airport, which was owned by the Borough of Luton, was considered to be the northern terminal for neighbouring London.

During the Second World War, the airport was used by the Royal Air Force, fighters of No. 264 Squadron being based there. Following the end of the conflict, the site was returned to the local council. In 1952 activity at the airport resumed on a commercial basis, a new control tower being opened around this time.

British aviation company Percival Aircraft had its factory at the airport until the early 1960s. Since the mid-1960s, executive aircraft have been based at the airport, initially operated by McAlpine Aviation. These activities have grown, and several executive jet operators and maintenance companies are currently based at Luton.

In the 1960s, Luton Airport played a key role in the development of the package holiday business, in which the popularity of the foreign holiday rose substantially, as the launch of new services had allowed greater numbers of people to travel abroad for the first time. Luton became the operating base for several charter airlines, such as Autair (which went on to become Court Line), Euravia (now TUI Airways, following Euravia's change of name to Britannia Airways and subsequent merger with First Choice Airways and TUI rebrand) and Dan-Air.

By 1969, a fifth of all holiday flights from the UK departed from Luton Airport; during 1972, Luton Airport was the most profitable airport in the country. However, Luton suffered a severe setback in August 1974 when major package holiday operator Clarksons and its in-house airline Court Line (which also operated coach links) ceased operations and were liquidated. Nevertheless, by 1978, the airport's management initiated an expansion plan as to allow Luton to accommodate as many as 5 million passengers per year.

=== 1980s and 1990s ===
During the 1980s, the airport experienced a decline in customer numbers; this was due to a lack of reinvestment while the nearby London Stansted Airport, which was also located north of London, was growing. The council responded to lobbying and focused again on developing the airport. In 1985, a new international terminal building was opened by the then Prince of Wales (now Charles III). Further updates and changes over the following 15 years were made, including the opening of a new international terminal and automated baggage handling facility, a new control tower with updated air traffic control systems, a new cargo centre and runway upgrades. In 1987, Luton Airport became a limited company, of which Luton Borough Council was the sole shareholder; this reorganisation was taken as it was felt that the airport ought to be operated at arm's length via an independent management team.

While developing the basic infrastructure, various business partners were courted and business models were considered. The process envisaged a cargo centre, an airport railway station, and a people mover from the station to the airport terminal (hence the unused underpass parallel to the road as one approaches the terminal). During 1991, an attempt was made to sell Luton Airport, but it was unsuccessful; instead, a new management team was appointed to turn around the business, stem the losses, and improve passenger numbers. Over the following five years, £30 million was invested in Luton's infrastructure and facilities.

Originally, the airport's runways had been grass tracks 18/36 and 06/24 and then a concrete runway 08/26. By the end of the 1980s, there was only one runway, 08/26. The 18/36 grass runway had disappeared under a landfill, while 06/24 had effectively become a taxiway. For Luton to maintain viability, it was necessary to update airfield services, and achieve CAT III status. This meant updating the instrument landing system (ILS), glidepath, and localiser and removing the hump in the runway; even a six-foot person could not see one end of the runway from the other. The hump was removed by building up layers at the end of the runway; this was done over 72 successive nights between October 1988 and February 1989, with the height being raised 90 mm (3.5 inches) on one particular night. During the course of this work, the airport would re-open for flights during the day.

In 1990, the airport was renamed London Luton Airport to re-emphasise the airport's proximity to the UK capital. In 1991, another setback occurred when Ryanair, which had flown from the airport to Ireland for a number of years, transferred its London operating base from Luton to rival Stansted. A decline in passenger numbers at Luton was attributed to this move. Later in the 1990s, Airtours began charter flights from the airport, using the Airtours International Airways brand and new low-cost scheduled flights from Debonair and easyJet, the latter making Luton its base. The arrival of these new operators marked a rapid increase in passenger numbers; during 1997/1998, 3.4 million people travelled via the airport, while 4.4 million travellers were recording during the following year, making Luton Airport the fastest growing major airport in the UK.

In August 1997, to fund an £80 million extension of the airport, the council issued a 30-year concession contract to a public-private partnership consortium, London Luton Airport Operations Limited, a partnership of Airport Group International (AGI) and Barclays Private Equity. AGI was a specialist airport management and development company once owned by Lockheed Martin. In 1999, AGI was sold to TBI plc; in 2001, Barclays also sold its shares in Luton to TBI plc.

On 25 November 1999, a new £40 million terminal designed by Foster + Partners was officially opened by Queen Elizabeth II and Prince Philip. This terminal houses 60 check-in desks, baggage and flight information systems, and a wide range of shops, restaurants and bars. The airport's railway station, Luton Airport Parkway was officially opened by Queen Elizabeth II on the same day and was built at a cost of £23 million. By train, journey times to the airport from central London would be reduced to less than 30 minutes.

=== Development since 2000 ===
The airport's logo 2001–2005

The airport's logo 2005–2014

In September 2004, Luton Airport embarked on a 10-month project to develop the departure and arrivals lounges and other facilities at a cost of £38 million; this work included a 9,000 sq ft (800 m^{2}) area featuring a spectacular vaulted ceiling that was completed with the new terminal, but intended to lie unused until required. On 1 July 2005, the new departure hall opened on schedule, featuring a boarding pier extending 200 m (660 ft) out between the airport's north and east aprons and relocated security, customs, and immigration facilities, as well as an expanded number of boarding gates from the previous number of 19 to 26.

In 2004, the airport management announced that they supported the government plans to expand the facilities, which included a full-length runway and a new terminal. However, local campaign groups, including Luton and District Association for the Control of Aircraft Noise (LADACAN) and Stop Luton Airport Plan (SLAP) opposed the new expansion plans, for reasons including noise pollution and traffic concerns; LADACAN also claimed that various sites, including Someries Castle, a Scheduled Monument, would be threatened by the expansion. On 6 July 2007, it was announced that the owners of London Luton Airport had decided to scrap plans to build a second runway and new terminal for financial reasons. In order for the airport to expand further, the Department for Transport (DfT) advised the airport authority to use the airport site more efficiently. The DfT supports plans to extend the runway from its current 2,160 m (7,087 ft) length to 3,000 m (9,843 ft) and increase the length of the taxiway. A full-length runway would increase airlines' operational flexibility by enabling the use of aircraft that have a greater payload capacity and longer range than is currently possible. A longer taxiway would maximise runway use by reducing the need for taxiing aircraft to cross or move along the runway.

In January 2005, London Luton Airport Operations Limited was acquired by Airport Concessions Development Limited, a company owned by Abertis Infraestructuras (90%) and Aena Internacional (10%), both Spanish companies. In November 2013, ownership of London Luton Airport Operations Ltd. passed to Aena and Ardian. In April 2018, AMP Capital acquired Ardian's 49% stake in the business.

By 2006, the last flight training operator had ceased training from the airport.

From 2006 to 2008, Silverjet operated long-haul flights to Newark and Dubai from a dedicated terminal but ceased operations due to the Great Recession.

In September 2016, La Compagnie announced it would cease operating its Luton to Newark service, citing economic reasons. Therefore, Luton lost its only long-haul service. In February 2017, Hungarian low-cost carrier Wizz Air announced it would to open its first British base at Luton Airport inaugurating three new routes to Tel Aviv, Pristina and Kutaisi in addition to more than a dozen already served ones from other bases. In May 2026 Kuwaiti airline Jazeera Airways announced the launch of direct flights between Kuwait and Luton starting in July 2026

In December 2018, a three-year redevelopment of the airport commenced. Costing roughly £160 million, the airport management stated that the upgrade, which included new shops, a new boarding pier, and more boarding gates, would increase overall capacity by 50%, enabling the site to accommodate 18 million passengers by 2020. Campaigners from local pressure groups such as LADACAN have complained that the airport had failed to incorporate noise reduction measures into the plan, while an airport spokesman stated "Our noise control measures are some of the most stringent of any major UK airport", noting that it had applied for additional flight restrictions. In addition, earlier that year, work had commenced on the construction of the Luton DART, an automated guided people mover which will travel between Luton Airport Parkway station and the airport. With costs estimated at £200 million, DART eliminated the need for shuttle buses since its opening on 27 March 2023.

An Israeli author, Alon Penzel, was detained and questioned by security staff in November 2024 at the airport in what he described as "an incident of pure antisemitism." Following an investigation, in March 2026, the airport publicly apologized and promised to overhaul staff training to prevent future racism incidents.

In July 2026, it was reported that three Israir aircraft had been damaged at the airport that year, with the airline blaming the airport and suspecting that the damage was caused maliciously. In response, the UK's Civil Aviation Authority announced that it would open an investigation.

== Ownership ==
The airport remains in municipal ownership, owned by the Luton Borough Council but managed by the private sector London Luton Airport Operations Limited (LLAOL). London Luton Airport has a Civil Aviation Authority Public Use Aerodrome Licence (Number P835) that allows flights for the public transport of passengers or for flying instruction. An indicator of the importance of the airport to the economy of Luton is that Luton is reported to have the highest number of taxicabs per head of population in the United Kingdom.

== Facilities ==
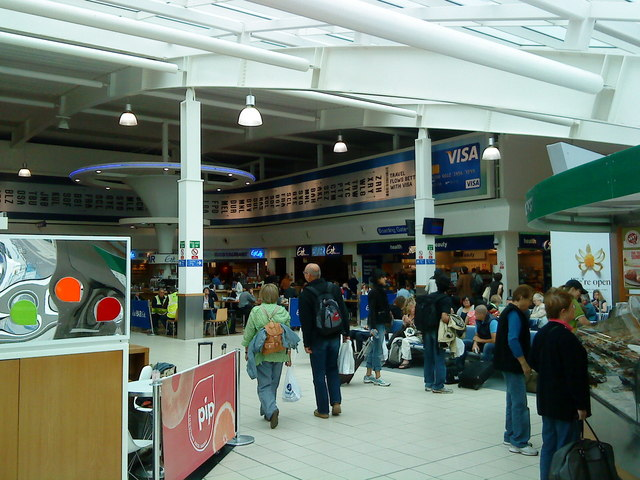
Waiting area

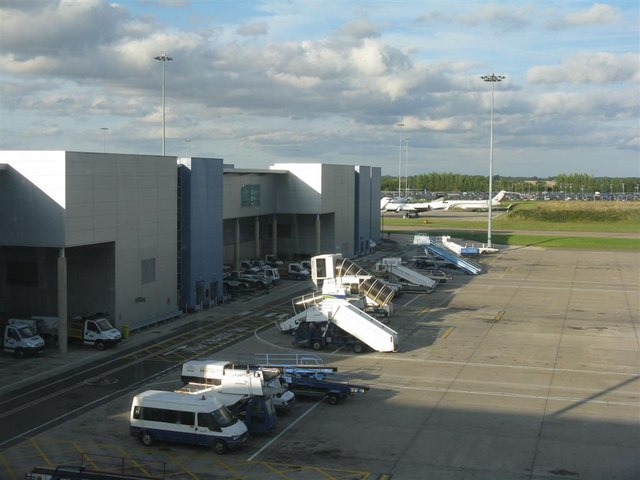
Apron

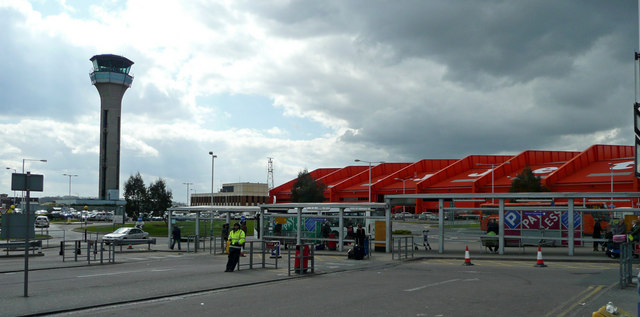
Control tower next to Hangar 89, the easyJet head office

=== Terminal ===
Luton Airport has a single, two-storey passenger terminal building which has been expanded and rearranged several times. The ground floor has a main hall equipped with 62 check-in desks (1-62), a separate security screening hall, as well as some shops, service counters, and the arrivals facilities. After the security screening hall, stairs lead to the departures lounge on the upper floor, where several more stores, restaurants and all 30 departure gates in three side piers (1-19, 20-28 and 30-43) can be found. Two airport lounges are located within the terminal.

=== Runway and aprons ===
The airport possesses a single runway, running roughly east to west (07/25), with a length of 2,162 m (7,093 ft) at an elevation of 526 ft (160 m). The runway is equipped with an Instrument Landing System (ILS) rated to Category IIIB, allowing the airport to continue operating in conditions of poor visibility.

All the airport facilities lie to the north of the runway. The terminal and aprons have an unconventional layout for a commercial airport, with terminal drop-off, bus stands, taxi ranks, and short-term car parks being accessed facing south towards the runway, being connected by a road. This road tunnels under a taxiway which connects the western apron area to the runway's taxiway network. There are approximately 60 stands available for aircraft, with 28 dedicated gates, which are all hardstands. All of these stands are located on the northern side of the terminal building, away from the runway and connected to it by a U-shaped set of taxiways and aprons that together encircle the terminal. The airport also has two multi storey car parks which connect to the terminal building.

The northern side of the U-shaped apron is ringed by a continuous line of hangars and other buildings, emphasising the fact that Luton is a major maintenance base for several airlines, including TUI Airways, EasyJet, and previously Monarch Airlines. By contrast to the heavily built up apron area, the airport's southern boundary is entirely rural with only a few isolated farm buildings and houses close to the airport boundary.

=== Expansion plans ===
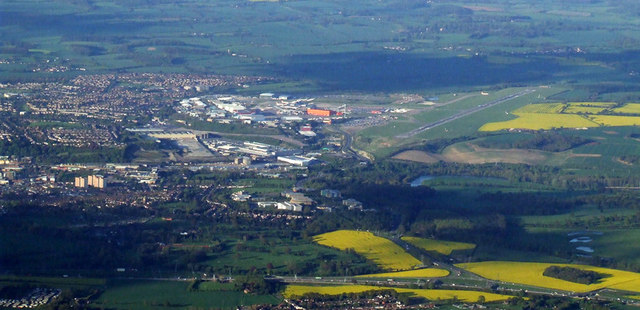
Luton Airport may be expanded further east into adjacent parkland (top middle of the photo).

==== New terminal ====
In February 2019, London Luton Airport Limited announced plans to expand the airport by building a second terminal. The expansion would increase airport capacity to handle 32 million passengers per year 2039. The enlarged airport would continue to operate using the existing single runway. LLAL have outlined several options for the site of the new Terminal 2. Most of the proposals involve a development that will encroach upon Wigmore Valley Park, a designated County Wildlife Site; an alternative site to the east would encroach upon the London Green Belt, and a further option proposes siting a new terminal to the south of the runway.

==== DART expansion ====
A public consultation in October 2019 included plans for a third stop on the Luton DART transit, which has been completed in 2023, transporting passengers from Luton Airport Parkway station to the concourse of the airport.

=== Other tenants ===
EasyJet's head office is Hangar 89 (H89), a building located on the grounds of London Luton Airport; the hangar, a former Britannia Airways/TUI facility, is located 150 metres (490 ft) from the former site of EasyLand, the previous headquarters of EasyJet. Hangar 89, built in 1974, has 30,000 sq ft (2,800 m^{2}) of office space and can house two aircraft the size of an Airbus A320 or Boeing 737 at one time. When EasyJet received H89, it had a 1970s style office setup. EasyJet modernised the building and painted it orange.

Additionally, the head office for TUI Airways was once located at the airport, and Monarch Airlines, along with the Monarch Group, was previously based in Prospect House on the airport grounds.

== Airlines and destinations ==
=== Passenger ===
The following airlines operate regular scheduled and cargo flights to and from London–Luton:

Airlines	Destinations
Dan Air	Bacău
easyJet	Aberdeen, Agadir, Alicante, Amsterdam, Antalya, Barcelona, Basel/Mulhouse, Belfast–City, Belfast–International, Berlin, Bordeaux, Djerba, Edinburgh, Enfidha, Faro, Fuerteventura, Funchal, Geneva, Glasgow, Gran Canaria, Hurghada, Inverness, Jersey, Lanzarote, Lisbon, Ljubljana, Lyon, Madrid, Málaga, Marrakesh, Milan–Malpensa, Murcia, Nice, Palma de Mallorca, Paphos, Paris–Charles de Gaulle, Pisa, Porto, Prague, Pristina (begins 7 December 2026), Reykjavík–Keflavík, Sharm El Sheikh, Tbilisi, Tel Aviv, Tenerife–South, Zürich; Seasonal: Almería, Bodrum, Catania, Chania, Corfu, Dalaman, Giza, Grenoble, Heraklion, Ibiza, Innsbruck, Isle of Man, İzmir, Kittilä (begins 24 November 2026), Larnaca, Menorca, Munich, Naples, Olbia, Palermo, Pula, Reus, Rhodes, Rovaniemi, Salzburg, Split, Strasbourg (begins 29 November 2026), Thessaloniki (begins 1 May 2027), Tivat, Turin, Zakynthos
El Al	Tel Aviv
FlyOne	Bucharest–Otopeni, Chișinău
Israir	Tel Aviv
Jet2.com	Fuerteventura, Funchal, Gran Canaria, Lanzarote, Tenerife–South; Seasonal: Alicante, Antalya, Corfu, Dalaman, Faro, Geneva, Girona, Heraklion, Ibiza, Kos, Menorca, Palma de Mallorca, Preveza/Lefkada, Reus, Rhodes, Skiathos, Verona, Zakynthos
Ryanair	Alicante, Barcelona, Bologna, Bydgoszcz, Cork, Dublin, Faro, Gran Canaria, Kaunas, Kerry, Knock, Kraków, Lublin, Málaga, Malta, Naples, Rzeszów, Seville, Tenerife–South, Venice, Vilnius, Wrocław; Seasonal: Athens, Béziers, Burgas, Catania, Fuerteventura, Grenoble, Lanzarote, Murcia, Turin
SunExpress	Seasonal: Antalya
TUI Airways	Seasonal: Palma de Mallorca
Wizz Air	Alicante, Asturias, Athens, Bacău, Barcelona, Belgrade, Bilbao, Bordeaux, Brașov, Bratislava, Bucharest–Băneasa, Bucharest–Otopeni, Budapest, Chișinău, Cluj-Napoca, Constanța, Craiova, Debrecen, Dortmund, Faro, Gdańsk, Giza, Granada, Iași, Istanbul, Katowice, Kaunas, Košice, Kraków, Larnaca, Lublin, Lyon, Madrid, Málaga, Milan–Malpensa, Plovdiv, Poprad-Tatry, Poznań, Prague, Pristina, Rome–Fiumicino, Sarajevo, Satu Mare, Seville, Sibiu, Skopje, Sofia, Suceava, Tallinn, Târgu Mureș, Tel Aviv, Timișoara, Tirana, Turin, Valencia, Varna, Venice, Vilnius, Warsaw–Chopin, Wrocław, Yerevan; Seasonal: Antalya, Burgas, Chania, Corfu, Grenoble, Hurghada, Mykonos, Palma de Mallorca, Rhodes, Sharm El Sheikh, Split, Tromsø, Zakynthos

=== Cargo ===
Airlines	Destinations
DHL Aviation	Leipzig/Halle, Milan–Malpensa

== Statistics ==
=== Traffic development ===
Year	Passengers (Note: Total number of Terminal and Transit Passengers during each year.)	Aircraft movements (Note: Total number of flight movements (take-offs and landings) during each year.)	Freight (tonnes) (Note: Total volume of freight (tonnes) during each year.)
1997	3,238,458	63,586	21,354
1998	4,132,818	70,667	25,654
1999	5,284,810	79,423	23,224
2000	6,190,499	84,745	32,992
2001	6,555,155	83,707	23,070
2002	6,486,770	80,924	20,459
2003	6,797,175	85,302	22,850
2004	7,535,614	94,379	26,161
2005	9,147,776	107,892	23,108
2006	9,425,908	116,131	17,993
2007	9,927,321	120,238	38,095
2008	10,180,734	117,859	40,518
2009	9,120,546	98,736	28,643
2010	8,738,717	94,575	28,743
2011	9,513,704	97,574	27,905
2012	9,617,697	96,797	29,635
2013	9,697,944	95,763	29,074
2014	10,484,938	101,950	27,414
2015	12,279,176	116,412	28,041
2016	14,551,774	131,536	25,464
2017	15,799,219	135,538	21,199
2018	16,581,850	136,511	26,193
2019	18,216,207	142,011	29,093
2020	5,550,821	59,769	31,155
2021	4,674,800	41,650	25,545
2022	13,324,491	87,783	31,049
2023	16,195,068	128,443	26,043
2024	16,735,894	131,972	30,667

=== Busiest routes ===
Busiest routes to and from Luton (2025)
Rank	Airport	Total passengers	Change 2024/25
1	Bucharest–Otopeni	561,524	▲7.6%
2	Tirana	502,085	▲15.5%
3	Amsterdam	491,145	▼13.7%
4	Warsaw–Chopin	453,417	▼1.1%
5	Budapest	439,936	▼2.9%
6	Palma de Mallorca	427,507	▲19.3%
7	Dublin	416,530	▲3.6%
8	Alicante	370,213	▲10.5%
9	Málaga	370,017	▲2.4%
10	Paris–Charles de Gaulle	343,659	▼0.9%

== Ground transport ==
=== Road ===
The airport is linked to the M1 motorway at junction 10 by the "New Airport Way" dual-carriageway road. There is a short stay car park adjacent to the terminal, together with medium and long term on airport car parks to the west and east of the terminal respectively and linked to the terminal by shuttle buses. Pre-booked off airport parking is also available from several independent operators.

=== Railway ===
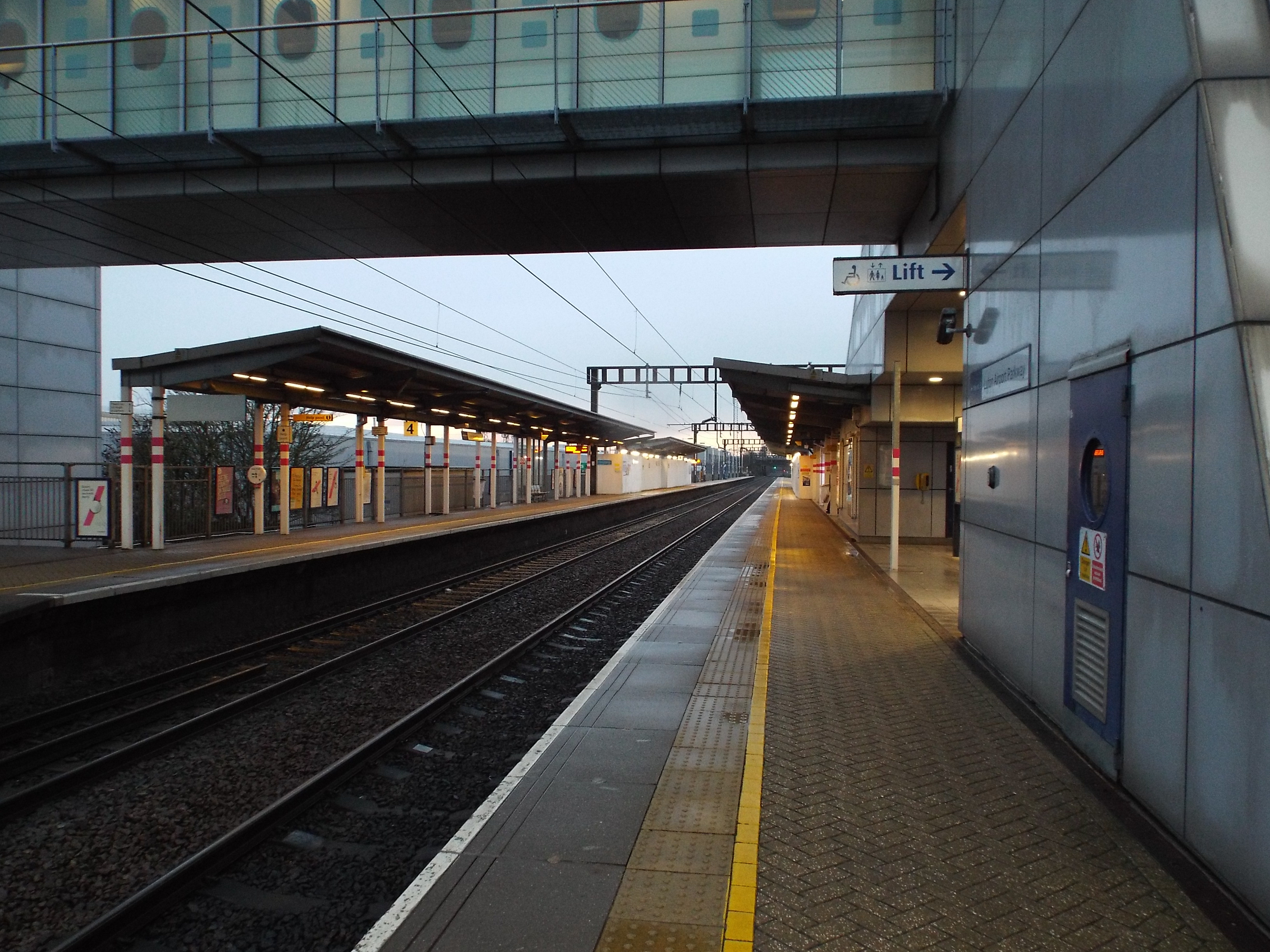
Luton Airport Parkway station

Luton Airport Parkway has served the airport since 1999. It is on the Midland Main Line, which connects London St Pancras with the East Midlands; journeys to London can take as little as 22 minutes. The station is served by two train operating companies:

- Greater Thameslink Railway is the primary operator, with regular stopping Thameslink-branded services to Bedford, St Albans City, London St Pancras, Rainham, Three Bridges, Gatwick Airport and Brighton
- East Midlands Railway operates semi-fast Luton Airport Express-branded services, which call at the station twice hourly. These trains run between London St Pancras and Corby, via Luton, Bedford and Kettering. Limited inter-city services to Nottingham and Sheffield stop here at peak times.

=== Airport transit ===
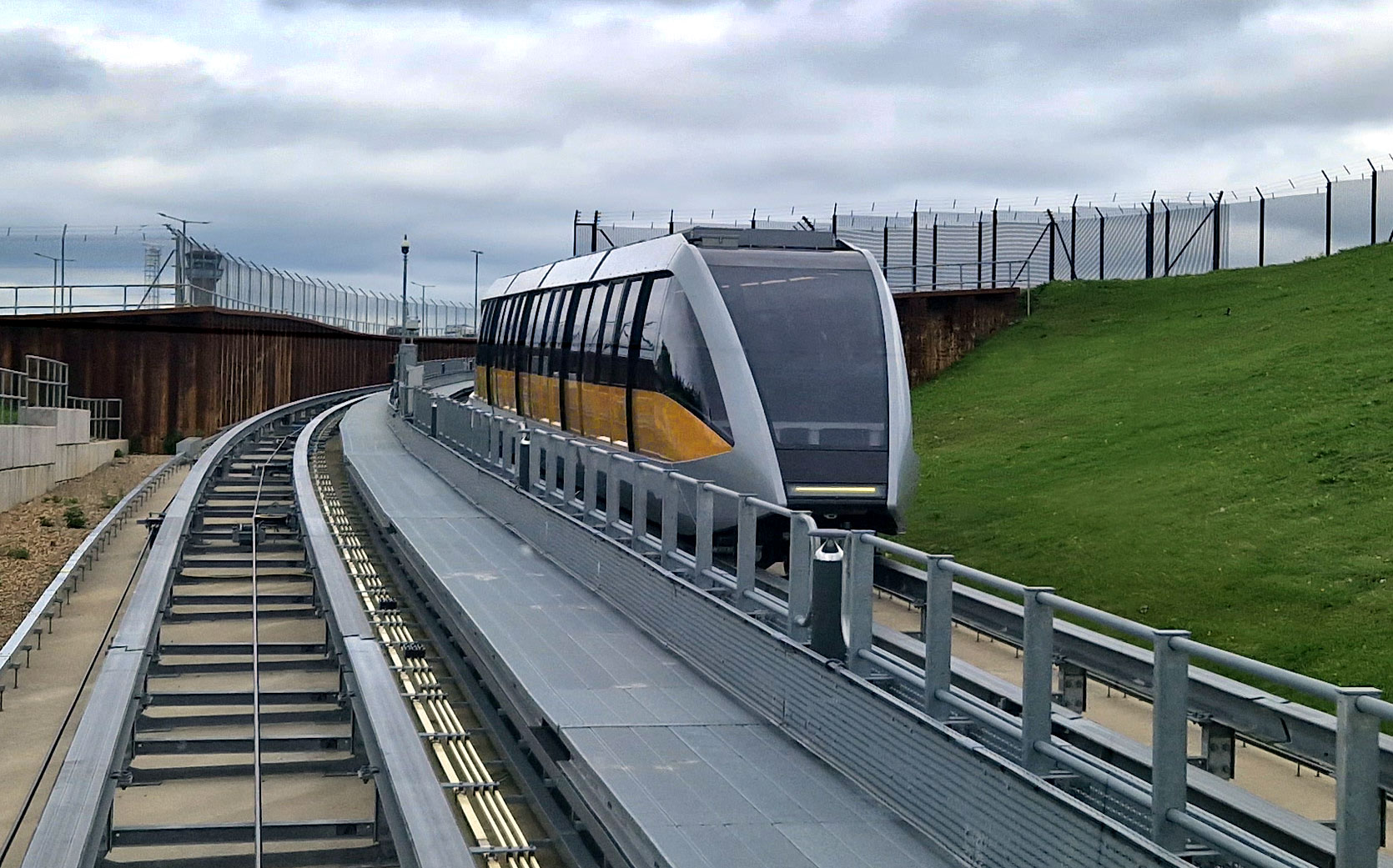
Luton DART airport transit

A light rail/automated guided people mover, Luton DART, provides a connection between the airport terminal and the railway station. The transit was officially opened by King Charles III in December 2022. It opened to passengers on 10 March 2023 operating a limited service for four hours per day, with the 24-hour service coming into effect around the end of the month. Shortly after, the DART transit replaced the shuttle bus service.

The single fare for the DART is £4.90. Rail tickets marked "Luton Airport" include the price of the DART transit. Concessions are given to Luton residents, and free travel is provided for holders of concessionary travel passes and disabled blue badge holders, and for airport workers.

=== Buses ===
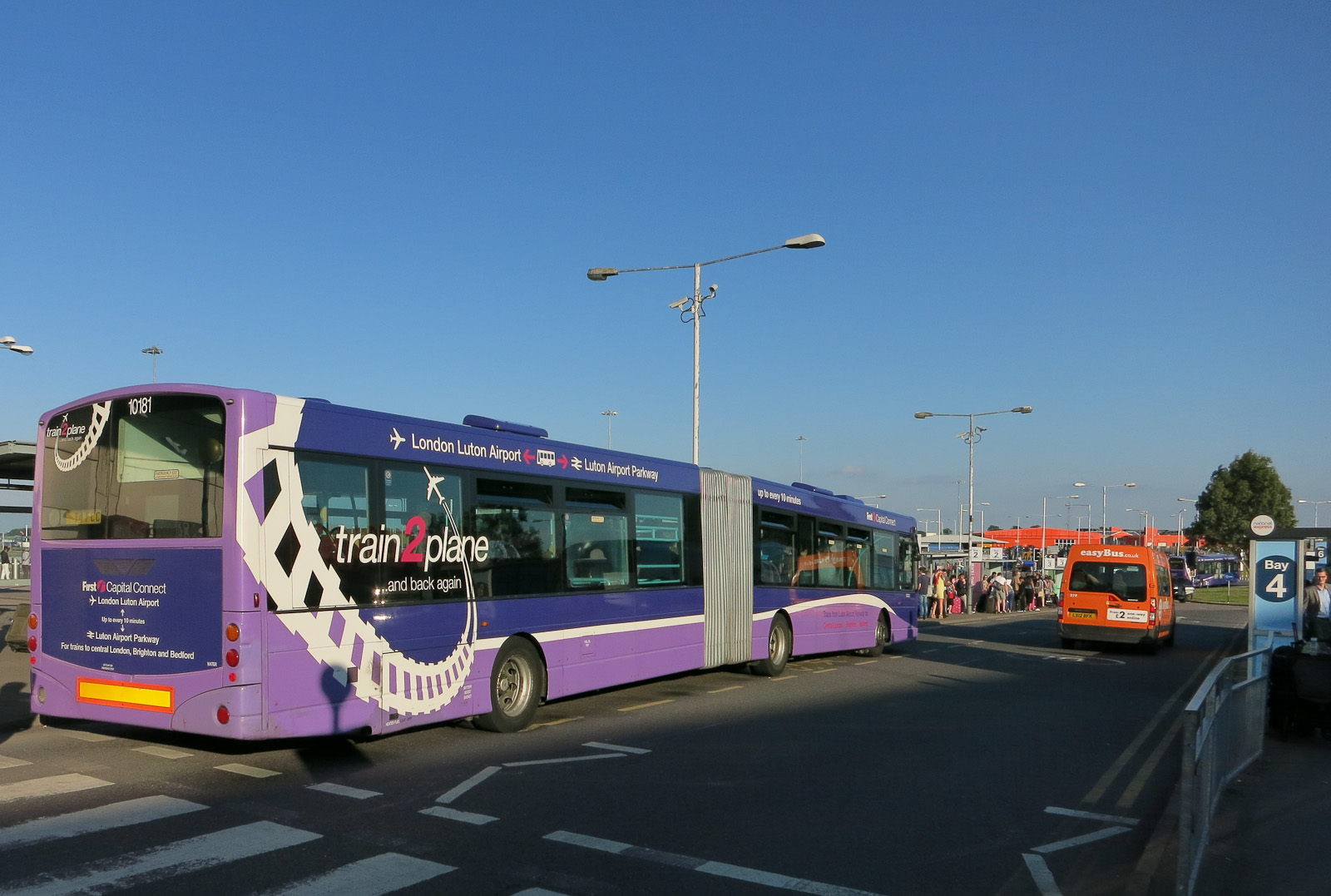
The train2plane Luton Airport bus

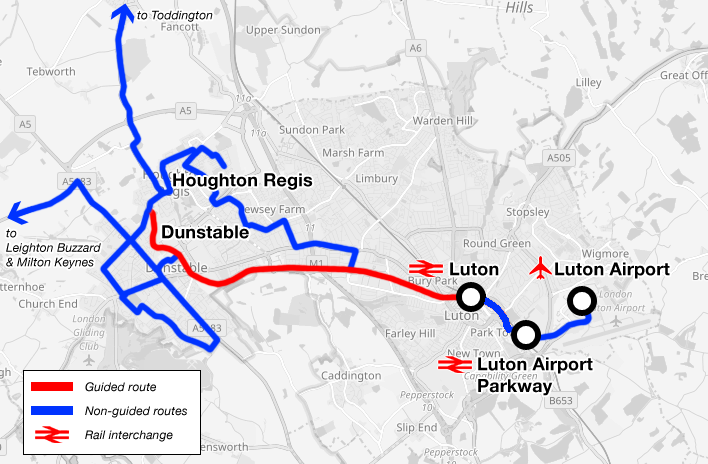
The Luton to Dunstable Busway route

Local buses connect Luton Airport with Luton town centre and other nearby places.

The airport is served by Route A of the Luton to Dunstable Busway, a bus rapid transit route which connects the airport with Luton Town Centre and the neighbouring towns of Dunstable, Houghton Regis and Milton Keynes. The buses, operated by Arriva Shires & Essex, run on a segregated guided busway track between Luton and Dunstable.

Conventional bus services also operate, connecting the airport with towns and cities in the region and parts of north London, including the 100, operated by Arriva, which offers an hourly daytime connection to the nearby towns of Hitchin and Stevenage; Metroline service 84A; Courtney Buses coach service to Bracknell.

Direct coach services to London include Green Line route 757 operated by Arriva Shires & Essex and the A1 operated by National Express, which operate competing services to and from Victoria Coach Station. EasyBus services operate towards Liverpool Street station. A range of longer-distance National Express services link the airport with Stansted, Heathrow and Gatwick Airports as well as destinations in the Midlands and North of England.

There are also three services around the airport operated by APCOA Parking, which operate 24 hours a day serving the terminal, mid stay, long stay, and staff car parks. The service that serves the staff car park also serves the car hire centre and rental companies, and all stops in between, including the Holiday Inn Express hotel. A new fleet of six Mercedes-Benz Citaro buses was purchased for these operations during 2014.

A range of other bus services operated by off-site parking companies also serve the airport. These include Airparks, Paige Airport Parking, Centrebus and Coach Hire 4 U. The latter two operators provide staff shuttle buses on behalf of EasyJet.

A former airport shuttle bus linking the airport and Luton Airport Parkway railway station has been replaced by the Luton DART rail transit, which came into service in March 2023.

== In popular culture ==
- Luton Airport appeared in two fly-on-the-wall television documentaries, Airline (1998) and Luton Airport (2005). Airline followed the staff of EasyJet at Luton and the airline's other bases across the country whilst the 2005 series followed the life of employees in a similar format to the show Airport, set in Heathrow Airport.
- The airport was mentioned in a 1977 television advert for Campari featuring Lorraine Chase and Jeremy Clyde, with the punch line "Were you truly wafted here from paradise?" — "No, Luton Airport". This advert was the inspiration for the 1979 UK hit song "Luton Airport" by Cats UK.
- The first episode of the second series of the BBC sitcom One Foot in the Grave is entitled In Luton Airport No-One Can Hear You Scream.
- Luton Airport was mentioned in the Piranha Brothers sketch from Monty Python's Flying Circus, as being the place where one of the brothers, Dinsdale, thinks that a giant hedgehog named Spiny Norman sleeps.
- In 2011, the airport featured in an episode of the series Supersize Grime which focused on the cleaning of an Airbus A321 at the Monarch Aircraft Engineering hangar 127.
- In 2022, YouTuber Max Fosh put up a giant text sign near Gatwick Airport saying "WELCOME TO LUTON" as a prank, causing passengers to believe that they had landed at Luton Airport instead.

== Accidents and incidents ==
- 4 November 1949: A Hawker Tempest single-engined piston fighter being operated by Napier Aircraft on a test flight crashed at the airport, killing the test pilot.
- 23 December 1967: A Hawker Siddeley HS 125 (registration: G-AVGW) of Court Line crashed shortly after taking off from Luton Airport, killing both pilots. The aircraft had been on a training flight. The crash occurred when the crew simulated an engine failure on takeoff. The HS 125 lost height rapidly and hit the roof of a nearby factory. This resulted in a post-crash fire.
- 3 March 1974: A Douglas DC-7C/F (registration: EI-AWG) operating an Aer Turas Teo charter flight from Dublin landed on runway 08 just after midnight but failed to achieve reverse thrust. Normal braking application also appeared to the crew to be ineffective and the emergency pneumatic brakes were applied. All main wheel tyres burst. The aircraft overran the runway and continued over the steep bank at the eastern perimeter finally coming to rest in soft ground 90 m (300 ft) beyond. The situation had also been made worse by an inadvertent application of forward thrust by the crew in trying to achieve reverse thrust. Three of the six passengers and two of the four crew were injured. The aircraft was badly damaged and deemed a write-off.
- 18 April 1974: A BAC One-Eleven 518FG (registration: G-AXMJ) operating Court Line Flight 95 was involved in a ground collision with Piper PA-23 Aztec (registration: G-AYDE) after the Aztec entered the active runway without clearance. The pilot of the Aztec was killed and his passenger was injured. All 91 people on board the One-Eleven successfully evacuated after take-off was aborted.
- 21 June 1974: A Boeing 727-46 (registration: G-BAEF) operating a Dan-Air charter flight to Corfu hit the localiser antenna while taking off, thereby rendering the runway's ILS inoperative. After being told by Luton air traffic control about the incident, the crew flying the aircraft elected to divert to London Gatwick where it landed safely without harming its 134 occupants (eight crew members and 126 passengers). The subsequent investigation revealed that the aircraft only just became airborne at the end of the runway, and as the ground fell away to the Lea valley below, the aircraft actually followed a downsloping course until finally gaining positive climb. The report concluded that there had been a cumulative effect of three factors – erosion of take-off run available; delay in starting rotation; and a very slow rate of rotation – as a result of the flightdeck crew's miscalculation of the aircraft's takeoff weight (too high), a wrong pressure ratio for two of the aircraft's three engines (too low) and a sub-optimal choice of runway based on the use of outdated wind information that omitted the latest update's tailwind component.
- 29 March 1981: A Lockheed JetStar 1329 (registration: N267L) operating an inbound flight from Nigeria overran runway 08 and came to rest down the embankment beyond the eastern perimeter fence. The accident was caused because the pilot landed well past the touchdown zone in poor visibility at night. At the time runway 08 did not have an ILS. The co-pilot suffered severe spinal injuries but the commanding pilot and seven passengers escaped with only minor injuries.
- 15 January 1994: A Bell 206B JetRanger helicopter (registration: G-BODW) rolled over on takeoff. One of the rotor blades sliced into the cabin, killing the pilot. The aircraft was badly damaged and deemed a write-off.
- 18 July 2022: During the 2022 United Kingdom heat wave, and with air temperatures close to 40 °C (104 °F) the runway melted and flights were forced to be diverted to Stansted, Bristol and other nearby airports. This led to severe delays for flights to and from the airport. The issue was rectified on the same day with flights resuming by the evening.
- 10 October 2023: At around 21:00, a large fire broke out in terminal car park 2, causing the partial collapse of the car park building. According to Bedfordshire Fire and Rescue Service, it was caused accidentally, by a diesel car fire that spread to other vehicles. Four firefighters and a member of airport staff were taken to hospital by the ambulance service. As a result of the fire, the airport suspended all flights until 15:00 the following day. It was reported that up to 1,500 cars in the car park were unsalvageable.

== See also ==
- Airports of London
- List of airports in the United Kingdom and the British Crown Dependencies
- Transport in Luton
