= Liverpool 1 (TV series) =

British television drama series (1998–1999)

- Also known as: Liverpool One
- Genre: Crime drama
- Created by: Simon Burke; Colin McKeown
- Written by: Simon Burke
- Directed by: Ken Horn; Anya Camilleri; David Innes Edwards; Terry McDonagh
- Starring: Samantha Janus; Mark Womack; Tom Georgeson; Paul Usher; Paul Broughton; Katy Carmichael; Simon O'Brien; Eamon Boland; Scot Williams; Andrew Lancel; Gillian Kearney
- Country of origin: United Kingdom
- Original language: English
- No. of series: 2
- No. of episodes: 12

Production
- Executive producer: Simon Burke
- Producer: Colin McKeown
- Running time: 60 minutes
- Production company: Lime Street Productions

Original release
- Network: ITV
- Release: 7 September 1998 – 25 October 1999

Liverpool 1 is a British television drama series centred on the work of a fictional Merseyside Police vice squad. Produced by Lime Street Productions for ITV, it starred Samantha Janus and Mark Womack and ran for two series from 7 September 1998 and 25 October 1999. The series represented an early vehicle for Janus' move into mainstream drama roles, following her success in the situation comedy Game On. Despite excellent viewing figures (which never dropped below 6.88m), ITV chose not to re-commission the show after series two. Repeats are intermittently shown on ITV3. The complete series was released on DVD for the first time on 15 August 2016.

== Plot ==
Liverpool 1 focuses on Detective Constable Isobel De Pauli (Samantha Janus), a successful Metropolitan Police detective. Her boyfriend’s career move to Liverpool in turn sees De Pauli transferred there, and given a job within the Bridewell Vice Squad, under the control of Chief Inspector Graham Hill (Eamon Boland), and overseen by DI Howard Jones (Tom Georgeson). Upon arrival, she is partnered with introverted DC Mark Callaghan (Mark Womack), a no-nonsense officer brought up on the streets of the city he now polices. De Pauli initially takes a disliking to Callaghan, after discovering that he was responsible for throwing a suspect from an apartment window, which is depicted in the opening sequence of the first episode, "Fresh Meat". However, as her relationship with boyfriend Will Timmer (Tristan Sturrock) collapses, De Pauli grows closer and closer to Callaghan, and becomes friends with his sister, Julie (Gillian Kearney), eventually becoming her lodger. De Pauli shows initial disdain for her new colleagues, but continually grows to like and become good friends with them as time goes on.

A number of events occur during the first series which depict the true identity of each character. DC Frank White (Paul Broughton) is depicted as a womaniser and all-round layabout, a decision which comes to haunt him when he places De Pauli's life in danger during a surveillance op in "Pipe Dreams", where he leaves his post to engage in sexual relations with the owner whose flat is being used as the OP. DC Jo McMullen (Katy Carmichael) is depicted as somewhat of an "ice queen", and immediately causes tension between herself and De Pauli. In "Death By Misadventure", the pair finally come to blows - but the subsequent fallout leads to somewhat of an epiphany for the pair. Callaghan is depicted as having somewhat broken relationships with a number of his siblings. The relationship with his brother, drug-addicted Patrick (Scot Williams), is fractured further when he forces Patrick to become an informant, which results in him being shot by a gang of drug dealers, leaving him with only one leg. His relationship with his sister, Julie, isn't much better. His older brother, Ian (Andrew Lancel), a priest for the Catholic church, also holds him in low respect. The first series also centres on the initial personality clash between De Pauli and Callaghan.

John Sullivan (Paul Usher), is the main antagonist of the series. The ongoing saga of the squad's pursuit of him over his dodgy business dealings, doubled with the fact that is none other than Callaghan's cousin, makes for a complex interweb of events which sees him turn from criminal mastermind to supergrass. It is also revealed that Callaghan previously had a relationship with Sullivan's wife, Sue, before they got together. Callaghan's difficult relationship with Sullivan is a recurring theme throughout the series. The interconnectedness of the city and its patrons results in several minor characters making more than once appearance in the series, including DS Christian Tomaszewski, who is introduced in "Nine Till Five" as an out-of-town detective investigating drug dealer O'Brien, who the squad also have in their sights. Tomaszewski then becomes a recurring character throughout the remainder of the series. One of the main relationships featured in the series, between De Pauli and Callaghan, later re-enacted itself in real life, as Janus and Womack began a relationship during the filming of the series. They have since had two children, Benjamin and Lily-Rose, and on 17 May 2009 the pair were married.

== Cast ==
- Samantha Janus as DC Isobel De Pauli, Vice Squad detective
- Mark Womack as DC Mark Callaghan, Vice Squad detective
- Tom Georgeson as DI Howard Jones, Vice Squad chief
- Paul Broughton as DC Frank White, Vice Squad detective
- Katy Carmichael as DC/Acting DS Jo McMullen, Vice Squad detective
- Eamon Boland as Chief Inspector Graham Hill, Head of division
- Paul Usher as John Sullivan, local gangland criminal and drug dealer
- Scot Williams as Patrick Callaghan, Mark's drug-addicted brother
- Andrew Lancel as Ian Callaghan, Mark's brother
- Gillian Kearney as Julie Callaghan, Mark's sister
- Simon O'Brien as DS Christian Tomaszewski, detective (Series 2, episodes 3—6)
- Stephen Walters as Mikey Sullivan (Series 1, Episode 1)

== Episode list ==
=== Series 1 (1998) ===
| No. | Title | Directed by | Written by | Original release date | Viewers (millions) |
|---|---|---|---|---|---|
| 1 | "Fresh Meat" | Ken Horn | Simon Burke | 7 September 1998 | 9.60 |
DC Isobel de Pauli is transferred to the vice squad at Bridewell, where she is introduced to her new partner, DC Mark Callaghan, who has recently suffered humiliation after major criminal Mikey Sullivan, whom he helped bring to justice, walks free from court due to an incorrect address on a search warrant. Their first case involves a disturbance at a club owned by major drug supplier John Sullivan, who happens to be Mikey's brother. De Pauli later follows up on an incident where a man was thrown from a balcony, but the victim refuses to cooperate. She decides to interrogate the victim's girlfriend, who implicates Callaghan in the assault. Meanwhile, Callaghan goes in search of his drug-addicted brother, who was the informant who gave him the tip-off about Mikey Sullivan. He begs him to testify in court, unaware that Sullivan's men are keeping a close eye on him. When his brother is found badly beaten and shot, De Pauli uses her negotiation skills on a prostitute working at the Sullivan's club in order to find where the gun used in the attack is being held. Believing they finally have the evidence they require, the team raid Mikey Sullivan's flat, but before they can arrest him, he jumps to his death.
| 2 | "Cut from the Same Cloth" | Ken Horn | Simon Burke | 14 September 1998 | 7.30 |
DCs Callaghan and de Pauli are interrogated about the abortive arrest of Mikey Sullivan, but when De Pauli refuses to lie to protect her colleague, DC McMullen begins to circulate vicious rumours about her. With the inquest into Mikey's death looming, John Sullivan invites Callaghan to his funeral, but DI Jones warns him to stay well away. Meanwhile, a young girl with a conviction for prostitution has gone missing. Suspicion initially falls on her boyfriend, who claimed to be at a nightclub with his friends on the night of her disappearance. De Pauli checks his alibi, and discovers the club was evacuated early in the evening due to a problem with the sprinkler system. When the girl is later found safe and well, De Pauli and Callaghan discover she is pregnant, and the suspicious actions of her father soon lead them to believe he could be the father. De Pauli tries to help Callaghan by ordering the dealer that he threw out of a window to move to London, thus bringing the investigation to a halt. But are her actions seriously misguided?
| 3 | "Lead Balloon" | David Innes Edwards | Simon Burke | 21 September 1998 | 7.22 |
DCs Callaghan and de Pauli interview a convicted child sex offender in connection with the disappearance of a young boy, Christopher Monaghan, from the play park opposite his house. A witness, a fellow 8-year-old, claims that Christopher was approached by a man who offered him a Nintendo game on the understanding he would come back to his house. DI Jones is convinced the man is responsible, but fails to break him in interview. The man strenuously denies all charges, a plea which is substantiated when the witness fails to pick the suspect out in an ID parade. However, Jones is convinced that the witness is scared of reprisal and asks him to record a further statement. Callaghan is appalled to learn that John Sullivan has put money into his brother's new bar, and offers to return his stake on the understanding that he stays well clear - but Sullivan refuses. De Pauli invites Callaghan round for dinner, but her boyfriend Will is less than enthusiastic. De Pauli and Callaghan begin to realise they may have feelings for each other.
| 4 | "Paper Trail" | David Innes Edwards | Simon Burke | 28 September 1998 | 6.88 |
DC de Pauli investigates a case of petty violence, and is drawn into John Sullivan's gangland past. Gang warfare erupts when Johnny Boateng moves in on Sullivan's territory, and De Pauli and Callaghan investigate a stabbing at one of Sullivan's clubs - but Boateng arrives for questioning aided by top lawyer J. Rex Negus.
| 5 | "Death by Misadventure" | Anya Camilleri | Simon Burke | 5 October 1998 | 8.02 |
DCs Callaghan and de Pauli find their private lives dragged into the station. The squad investigate the murder of a prostitute. De Pauli has trouble on the home front when her boyfriend, Will, announces that he has had enough of Liverpool and quit his job.
| 6 | "Pipe Dreams" | Ken Horn | Simon Burke | 12 October 1998 | 7.70 |
DCs De Pauli and White, who has finally been kicked out by his wife, are on night surveillance. De Pauli gets into trouble when she is trapped in a chip shop with the very people they are supposed to be observing, and White is nowhere to be seen. De Pauli is forced to choose between the job and her fiancé following the outcome of the operation.

=== Series 2 (1999) ===
| No. | Title | Directed by | Written by | Original release date | Viewers (millions) |
|---|---|---|---|---|---|
| 1 | "Lest Ye Be Judged" | Anya Camilleri | Simon Burke | 20 September 1999 | 8.64 |
Callaghan is approached by a former informant, Carmen Fitzgerald, who claims she has information in relation to the murder of her best friend, Lyndsey Mackie, who disappeared on New Year's Eve. She claims that Lyndsey was murdered by her pimp, but has no information as to the whereabouts of the body. Cally and De Pauli interview the girl's father (Del Henney), who still holds out hope that his daughter is alive.
| 2 | "King of the Castle" | Anya Camilleri | Simon Burke | 27 September 1999 | 7.86 |
De Pauli is approached by Ian, who is concerned about the welfare of one of his parishioners, John Kelly (Conor McIntyre), whose daughter, Simone, has got into a shoplifting ring. He asks De Pauli to have a quiet word, but when she interviews the girl, she discovers she was bought the trainers by her music teacher, Peter Kitchen (Adrian Rawlins), who she claims has been sexually abusing her. Kitchen denies all knowledge of the abuse, and when Kelly persuades his daughter to retract her statement, Jo is suspicious that he might be the abuser. Meanwhile, it's Patrick's birthday, and Julie organises him a surprise party. Patrick, however, refuses to play ball and ends up going to the pub and getting hammered. Cally decides to check up on Carmen to find out how her stint in rehab is progressing, but ends up getting stick from both De Pauli and Frank. As the investigation into Kitchen concludes, Frank discovers a disturbing piece of information which suggests that Kitchen is assuming a fake identity – and is, in fact, a paedophile.
| 3 | "Nine Till Five" | Terry McDonagh | Simon Burke | 4 October 1999 | 8.26 |
De Pauli and Jo go undercover at a nightclub in the hope of securing evidence against O'Brien (Patrick O'Kane), a known drug dealer with a history of violence. When De Pauli's cover is blown, the operation is aborted, much to the dismay of Tomaszewski, an out-of-town detective who finally hoped to bring O'Brien to justice with the squad's help. The situation turns from bad to worse when O'Brien manages to obtain Pauli's address, and leaves a threatening note on her front door. Cally and Frank decide to pay O'Brien a visit, but their incitement only leads to further intimidation. When Julie finds out, she is disgusted and warns Cally to stay away. Meanwhile, Sullivan tries to use Cally to help patch up his marriage, but Sue rebuffs him, and reveals that she has fallen in love with another man. When O'Brien issues another threat, De Pauli decides to seek refuge in a police hostel, but not before she and Cally come to blows - and end up kissing each other. Meanwhile, Pauli is furious to discover that Jo has ratted Frank out to Howard.
| 4 | "Pause for Thought" | David Innes Edwards | Simon Burke | 11 October 1999 | 6.92 |
Word reaches the squad that a fresh supply of uncut heroin has hit the streets, but Howard is unimpressed when Hill orders him to abandon the investigation and instead re-open the investigation into a massage parlour suspected of offering 'optional benefits'. With one further hit required before a raid can go ahead, Cally goes undercover posing a customer, but ends up with egg on his face. Frank decides to finish the job and is able to gather the required evidence, but when the raid goes down, masseuse Michelle Lynch (Christine Tremarco) makes allegations against Frank which result in him being suspended from duty. Cally is convinced that Michelle is lying, and with Pauli's help, manages to convince her to change her statement. Meanwhile, following their romantic tryst, Cally and Pauli meet for lunch and decide to stay friends, instead of forming a relationship. Howard announces that Tomaszewski will be taking the vacant Sergeant's position, much to the dislike of Cally. Jo, however, is pleased that her new beau is sticking around.
| 5 | "A Rush of Blood to the Head" | David Innes Edwards | Simon Burke | 18 October 1999 | 7.42 |
Following an anonymous tip-off, the team organise a raid on the flat of Connor Tierney (Ian Puleston-Davies), the man they suspect of being the supplier of uncut heroin which has resulted in four drug-related deaths. However, during the raid, Tierney claims that a twelve-year-old boy, Lee, who has been staying with him, has vanished. Tierney is taken in for interrogation, while the search for Lee gets underway. Lee's mother, Bernadette, appears to have little care for her son, even when he turns up dead on a piece of overgrown wasteground. Tierney claims that Bernadette was the one responsible for dealing heroin, and that he only ever supplied one of her desperate customers while she was away. Meanwhile, Hill pressures Pauli to take her relationship with Sullivan to the next step in order to secure him as an informant. Pauli, however, is less keen on the idea and suggests that the team drop their pursuit of Sullivan. Cally becomes worried when Carmen fails to sign for her bail, but discovers that she has made an unlikely new friend.
| 6 | "Sweet Dreams" | Anya Camilleri | Simon Burke | 25 October 1999 | 6.94 |
Cally is forced to re-think his future in the police force when he offers to provide a false alibi for John Sullivan's brother Liam, who is arrested on suspicion of shooting club bouncer Joseph Aherne. Despite Aherne himself naming Sullivan, and an off-duty police officer placing Sullivan at the scene, Cally refuses to change his statement. Hill is convinced that he has faked the alibi, and pushes Howard to expose him, but Howard refuses to let Hill's suspicions mar his faith. When an angered Pauli confronts him, he struggles to lie to her, and decides to tender his resignation. Despite a desperate plea from Howard, and an unexpected apology from Pauli, he refuses to change his mind. Meanwhile, Frank is weary at the impending arrival of Tomaszewski, but when he spots Jo and Tomaszewski in a passionate embrace, he begins to play the situation to his advantage. Realising that her actions may have spelled the end of Cally's career, Pauli decides to bury the hatchet. But will the pair finally get the happy ending they have been waiting for?
