= Paul Curtis (musician) =

- Born: Paul Michael Curtis; 1950 (age 75–76); England
- Genres: Pop music
- Occupations: Singer, songwriter, record producer
- Instrument: Vocals
- Years active: 1970s–present

Paul Michael Curtis (born 1950) is an English singer, songwriter, record producer from London, who holds the record for the highest number of songs to make the finals of the A Song for Europe contest, the BBC's annual competition to choose the UK's entry to the Eurovision Song Contest, competing with 20 separate songs from 1975 to 1992.

== Career ==
Paul Curtis recorded under the name of Mickey Moonshine for one single "Name It You Got It" on the uk Decca label in 1974. This was a popular track played on the Northern soul scene a few years later and was re-released to capitalise on the demand at the time. His true identity on this track had been queried over the years. Some suggestions were Alvin Stardust, Paul Nicolas and the favourite-Chris Rainbow. Two phone calls followed from the Soul source Internet list members in 2008. One to Chris Rainbow on the isle of Skye confirmed it wasn't him, and one to record label owner Paul Mooney from Paul Curtis himself confirming it was him.

Curtis also holds the record for having written the most number of UK entries at the Eurovision Song Contest. Four of his songs have won the UK selection contest with his debut attempt, "Let Me Be The One" by The Shadows, doing best at Eurovision, finishing in second place at the final in Stockholm, Sweden in 1975. His second song to go on to the Eurovision final, which he wrote in collaboration with Graham Sacher, "Love Games" by Belle and the Devotions, caused a storm of controversy when it was booed from the stage in Luxembourg. Curtis and his co-writer Sacher, were accused of plagiarism, and the singers on stage were largely faking their performance. In addition, Curtis has twice sung his own compositions in the UK national competition, "No Matter How I Try" (1982), and as leader of Duke and the Aces in 1980, performing "Love Is Alive".

Curtis was married to singer Ronnie France, who herself performed one of her husband's compositions in the 1978 UK final, "Lonely Nights". He had a son in 1978, John-Paul whilst married to Ronnie France. In 1984, Curtis wrote four of the eight finalists for the competition, having written three out of eight in 1982.

Some artists got their first break by recording Curtis compositions and performing them in the Eurovision heat. Hazell Dean and Sinitta both made their TV debuts in A Song for Europe. David Ian was part of two groups who sang Curtis songs, First Division in 1984 and Jump in 1986.

Of the four songs that Curtis wrote to win the UK competition, all made the Top 40 in the UK Singles Chart. The Shadows' "Let Me Be The One" reached number 12 in 1975; in 1984 Belle and the Devotions' "Love Games" hit number 11; Emma (Booth) peaked at number 33 with "Give A Little Love Back to the World" in 1990; and Samantha Janus scored a number 30 hit in 1991 with "A Message To Your Heart".

In 1990, Curtis joined with fellow songwriters Martin Lee and David Kane, to compose a musical based on The Butterfly Children books by Angela and Pat Mills. The musical had its world premiere at the Mitchell Theatre in Glasgow, to open the 1990 Glasgow City of Culture and ran for a month and was performed by the Mitchell Theatre For Youth. Just three months later, the show transferred to the larger Kings Theatre in Glasgow and ran for two weeks. The show transferred in late 1992 to London's West End. The Butterfly Children, essentially a children's show, featured many differing styles of music from rap to rock and country and western to pop. The show's run ended after a short season, and has not been performed since.

== A Song for Europe entries ==
- 1975: "Let Me Be The One" – The Shadows (1st)
- 1976: "I Couldn't Live Without You for a Day" – Hazell Dean (=8th)
- 1978: "One Glance" – The Jarvis Brothers (=3rd)
- 1978: "Lonely Nights" – Ronnie France (9th)
- 1979: "Let It All Go" – Sal Davis (9th)
- 1980: "Love Is Alive" – Duke and the Aces (7th)
- 1982: "No Matter How I Try" – Paul Curtis (=4th)
- 1982: "Different Worlds, Different People" – Lovin' Feeling (=4th)
- 1982: "How Long?" – The Weltons (7th)
- 1983: "We've Got All The Time in the World" – Mirror (2nd)
- 1984: "Love Games" – Belle and the Devotions (1st)
- 1984: "Where The Action Is" – First Division (2nd)
- 1984: "Let It Shine" – Miriam Ann Lesley (5th)
- 1984: "Imagination" – Sinitta (3rd)
- 1985: "Let Me Love You One More Time" – Annabel (5th)
- 1985: "Dancing in the Night" – Keri Wells (2nd)
- 1986: "Don't Hang Up on Love" – Jump (2nd)
- 1990: "Give a Little Love Back to the World" – Emma (1st)
- 1991: "A Message to Your Heart" – Samantha Janus (1st)
- 1992: "This Is The Moment I've Been Waiting For" – Michael Ball (5th)
