= Berlant =

Berlant is an Ashkenazi Jewish surname. Notable people with the surname include:

- Kate Berlant (born 1987), American comedian, actress, and writer
- Lauren Berlant (1957–2021), American cultural theorist and author
- Tony Berlant (born 1941), American artist
