= Babies (2026 film) =

- Directed by: Lauren Miller Rogen
- Written by: Lauren Miller Rogen
- Produced by: Steve Barnett; Stuart Ford; Lauren Miller Rogen; Jen W. Ray
- Starring: Anna Kendrick; Seth Rogen; Kate Berlant; Issa Rae; Dan Stevens; Ed Helms; Zach Cherry; Ashley Park; Sharon Stone; David Strathairn
- Cinematography: Edu Grau
- Edited by: Joi McMillon
- Music by: Nami Melumad
- Production companies: AGC Studios; Monarch Media; Lylas Pictures
- Distributed by: Roadside Attractions; Vertical
- Release dates: September 12, 2026 (TIFF); February 19, 2027 (United States)
- Running time: 96 minutes
- Country: United States
- Language: English

Babies is a 2026 American comedy-drama film written and directed by Lauren Miller Rogen. The film stars Anna Kendrick, Seth Rogen, Kate Berlant, Issa Rae, Dan Stevens, Ed Helms, Zach Cherry, Ashley Park, Sharon Stone, and David Strathairn.

The film premiered at the 2026 Toronto International Film Festival on September 12, 2026, and will be theatrically released in the United States on February 19, 2027, by Roadside Attractions and Vertical.

== Cast ==
- Anna Kendrick as Annie
- Seth Rogen as Aaron
- Kate Berlant as Eliza
- Issa Rae as Becky
- Dan Stevens as Luke
- Zach Cherry as Ethan
- Sharon Stone as Susan
- Ed Helms
- David Strathairn as Michael
- Ashley Park
- Adam Shapiro as Teacher
- Dey Young as Marcia
- Alexis Louder
- Christina Moses as Malorie

== Production ==
In August 2025, it was announced that Seth Rogen and Anna Kendrick were in negotiations to star in the film. In November 2025, it was reported that Issa Rae, Dan Stevens, Zach Cherry and Kate Berlant were cast in the film and that filming occurred in Los Angeles. In December 2025, it was announced that Sharon Stone, Ed Helms, David Strathairn and Ashley Park were cast in the film. Babies was co-financed and produced by AGC Studios and Monarch Media, alongside Lylas Pictures.

== Release ==
The film premiered at the Toronto International Film Festival on September 12, 2026. In August 2026, Roadside Attractions and Vertical acquired U.S. distribution rights to the film, planning to release it sometime in 2027; Amazon MGM Studios is understood to hold rights in Canada. The film is scheduled for a theatrical release in the United States on February 19, 2027.
