= Austin Haynes (actor) =

British actor (born 2008/09)

- Born: 2008 or 2009 (age 17–18); Leeds, West Yorkshire, England
- Occupation: Actor
- Years active: 2017–present

Austin Haynes (born 2008 or 2009) is a British actor. He is best known for playing Thomas in the film The Railway Children Return (2022), and on television as Tom McKinney in Unforgivable, Fredo in Adolescence, young Danny in Somewhere Boy and Andrew Simmonds in All Creatures Great and Small.

== Early life ==
Austin Haynes was born in 2008 or 2009 in Leeds, West Yorkshire. Haynes is the older brother of Rocco Haynes, also an actor.

== Career ==
Haynes landed his first cast TV role in the BBC1 drama The A Word (2017), where he plays the role of Olly.

He is a keen guitarist, and his first breakthrough role was busking on the streets in the Co-op advert for Christmas in 2020 to Oasis' "Round Are Way" with younger brother, Rocco. The ad went on to win several awards, including "Best Casting Featuring Children" at the Casting Directors Association Awards 2021, at BAFTA.

He has appeared in a variety of different TV roles in many well-known productions, including Gentleman Jack, Dodger, Andy and the Band, Ted's Top Ten, All Creatures Great And Small, and Channel 4's Somewhere Boy, BAFTA-nominated for best drama.

His films include comedy heist The Duke, where he starred alongside Jim Broadbent and Dame Helen Mirren; crime film The Pure and the Damned; Iniquity; and The Boys in the Boat (2023), for MGM, a story about a 1930s American rowing team, where he plays the role of Joe Rantz's grandson, directed by George Clooney.

Haynes's first major leading role was released in the summer of 2022, for StudioCanal's The Railway Children Return, alongside Jenny Agutter, Sheridan Smith, John Bradley, and Tom Courtenay.

Haynes went on to complete filming on feature film Jackdaw for Anton Productions, working alongside Thomas Turgoose, Jenna Coleman and Oliver Jackson-Cohen and BBC's The Power of Parker, working alongside Conleth Hill, George Costigan and Sian Gibson.

Early 2024, Haynes completed filming on boxing biopic Giant, with Pierce Brosnan, again appearing alongside younger brother Rocco. Sylvester Stallone and Braden Aftergood are among the executive producers through Balboa Productions.

In the summer of 2024, Haynes was cast in Adolescence, a four-part limited crime drama told in a real-time, using a one-shot style, with Stephen Graham and Ashley Walters. Phillip Barantini directs and Warp Films, Matriarch Productions, and Plan B Entertainment produced the series for Netflix.

Later that year he landed further roles in Mission Impossible : The Final Reckoning; comedy series Here We Go and The Power of Parker Series 2, before landing a leading role in Jimmy McGovern's Unforgivable, alongside Anna Friel, Anna Maxwell Martin, David Threlfall and Bobby Schofield. Haynes performance was met with critical acclaim with Lucy Mangan from The Guardian praising the “faultless performances”

== Filmography ==
=== Film ===
Year	Title	Role	Notes
2019	Downton Abbey	Yorkshire Boy	
2020	Co-op Round Are Way	Busker Boy	
2020	The Duke	Scruffy Little Boy	
2021	Iniquity	Young Michael	Lead role
2021	Ali & Ava	Aiden Riley	
2022	The Pure and the Damned	Young Isaac	
2022	Youthless	Jud	Lead role
2022	The Railway Children Return	Thomas	Lead role
2023	The Boys In The Boat	Joe Rantz Grandson	
2023	Jackdaw	Geordie Boy	
2025	Mission Impossible : The Final Reckoning	Student	
2025	Good Boy	Boy	
2026	Giant	Trev	
TBA	Two Kids	Casey Molton	Lead

=== Television ===
Year	Title	Role	Notes
2017	The A Word	Olly Chapman	2 episodes
2018	The Tempest	Sailor	TV special
2019	The Feed	Brother	Episode #1.2
2019	Gentleman Jack	Pit Boy	Episode: "Most Women Are Dull and Stupid"
2020	Last Tango in Halifax	School Boy	Episode #5.2
2020, 2022	All Creatures Great And Small	Joseph / Andrew Simmonds	2 episodes; Guest lead
2021	Ted's Top Ten	Keevan Griffiths	2 episodes; Guest lead
2021	The Irregulars	Urchin	Episode: "Chapter Four: Both the Needle and the Knife"
2022	Dodger	George Minnow	2 episodes
2022	Andy and the Band	Leo	Episode: "Detention Break"; Guest lead
2022	Somewhere Boy	Teenage Danny	3 episodes; Lead role
2023, 2025	The Power of Parker	Ryan Slater	4 episodes
2024	Supercars of Wakey	Jack Chittenden	Lead role
2024	The Responder	Danny	Episode #2.1
2025	Adolescence	Fredo	2 episodes
2025	Here we go	Ryan	Episode #3.3
2025	Unforgivable	Tom McKinney	TV Film; Lead role
2025	Play for Today : Special Measures	Callum	Episode #1.4; Lead role
TBA	Wrong Move	Jack	

== Recognition and awards ==
In November 2022, Haynes was awarded 'Yorkshire's Young Achiever of the Year', for Achievement in the Arts.
