= AGC Studios =

American film and television production company

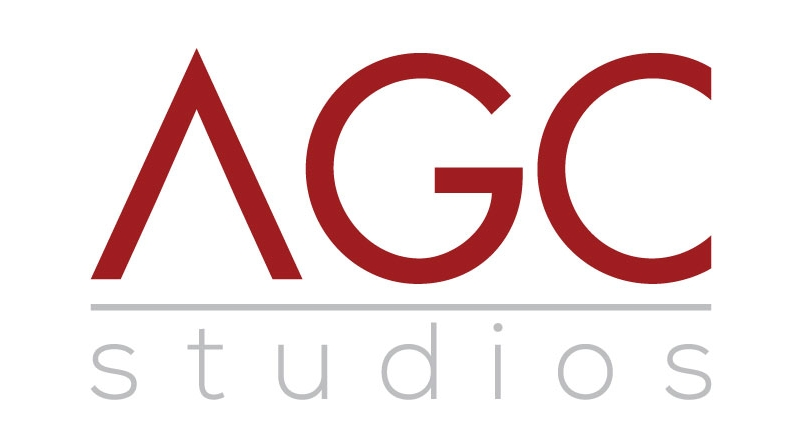
- Industry: Film industry Television industry
- Predecessor: IM Global
- Founded: 2018; 8 years ago
- Founder: Stuart Ford
- Headquarters: 1680 Vine Street, Los Angeles, California 90028, United States
- Divisions: AGC Television; AGC International; AGC Productions; AGC Capital; AGC Unwritten
- Website: agcstudios.com

AGC Studios is an American film and television production studio. It was founded and launched by Chairman and CEO Stuart Ford in February 2018 as a platform to develop, produce, finance and globally license a diverse portfolio of feature films, scripted, unscripted and factual television, digital and musical content from its dual headquarters in Los Angeles and London. AGC has a wide-ranging multicultural focus, designed for exploitation across an array of global platforms including major studio partnerships, streaming platforms, traditional broadcast and cable television networks and independent distributors, both in the U.S. and internationally.

AGC Studios was initially backed by three key strategic investors: Latin American private asset management firm MediaNet Partners; Image Nation Abu Dhabi, one of the leading media and entertainment companies in the Arabic-speaking world; and leading Silicon Valley entrepreneur and chairman of Fibonacci Films, Greg Clark.

== Filmography ==
=== Released ===
Release date	Title	Notes
November 8, 2019	Midway	distributed by Lionsgate
November 15, 2019	Scandalous: The True Story of the National Enquirer	distributed by Magnolia Pictures
July 3, 2020	John Lewis: Good Trouble	distributed by Magnolia Pictures and Participant
September 16, 2020	The Secrets We Keep	distributed by Bleecker Street
January 14, 2021	Locked Down	distributed by HBO Max and Warner Bros. Pictures
February 12, 2021	Breaking News in Yuba County	distributed by American International Pictures
April 9, 2021	Voyagers	distributed by Lionsgate
June 27, 2021	Lady Boss: The Jackie Collins Story	distributed by CNN Films
August 20, 2021	Demonic	distributed by IFC Midnight
September 10, 2021	Queenpins	distributed by STXfilms
February 2, 2022	The Tinder Swindler	distributed by Netflix
February 4, 2022	Moonfall	distributed by Lionsgate
June 3, 2022	Watcher	distributed by IFC Midnight and Shudder
February 10, 2023	Consecration	distributed by IFC Films and Shudder
June 23, 2023	The Perfect Find	distributed by Netflix
October 27, 2023	Freelance	distributed by Relativity Media
March 22, 2024	Late Night with the Devil	distributed by IFC Midnight and Shudder
May 10, 2024	Poolman	distributed by Vertical Entertainment
May 24, 2024	Hit Man	distributed by Netflix
June 14, 2024	The Present	distributed by Gravitas Ventures
October 11, 2024	The Silent Hour	distributed by Republic Pictures
October 18, 2024	Woman of the Hour	distributed by Netflix
December 6, 2024	The Order	distributed by Vertical
August 22, 2025	Eden	distributed by Vertical
October 10, 2025	Kiss of the Spider Woman	distributed by Roadside Attractions and Lionsgate Films
April 24, 2026	Desert Warrior	distributed by Vertical
May 15, 2026	Driver's Ed	distributed by Vertical
May 22, 2026	Giant	distributed by Vertical

=== Upcoming ===
Release date	Title	Notes
January 15, 2027	Fing	distributed by Angel Studios
2027	Babies	distributed by Vertical & Roadside
TBA	Sugar Bandits	distributed by Paramount Pictures
TBA	All That I Am	
TBA	Phantom Son	
TBA	Fleur	
TBA	The Last Druid	
TBA	The Journeyman	

== Television ==
AGC Television is the television production and distribution division of Stuart Ford's independent content studio AGC Studios.

=== Released ===
Year	Title	Notes
2019–2021	War of the Worlds	
2022	News of a Kidnapping	
2022	Leopard Skin	
2022–2024	Troppo	
2023	Gray	
2024	Those About to Die	
2024	Nobu	
2026	Vanished	

=== Upcoming ===
Year	Title	Notes
TBA	Embassy	
