= Richard Mettler =

French-born American film editor (1970–2026)

- Born: 1970; France
- Died: June 1, 2026 (aged 56); New York City, U.S.
- Occupation: Film editor

Richard Mettler (1970 – June 1, 2026) was a French-born American film editor. He was best known for his film editing work in the films Desert Warrior, Jacob's Ladder, I.S.S., Metro Manila, The Secrets We Keep, The Cursed and Anthropoid.

Mettler died of cancer at the Memorial Sloan Kettering Cancer Center in New York, on June 1, 2026, at the age of 56.
