= Rocco Haynes =

English child actor (born 2013)

- Born: Leeds, England
- Occupation: Actor
- Years active: 2017–present

Rocco Haynes is an English child actor.

== Early life ==
Rocco Haynes was born in Leeds, West Yorkshire. Haynes is the younger brother of Austin Haynes, also an actor.

== Career ==
Haynes started his acting career aged three appearing in a small role in The A Word. He went on to land his first speaking part in Gentleman Jack, playing the role of 'Billy Hardcastle', directed by Sally Wainwright.

Haynes first standout role was appearing in the Coop Christmas commercial ‘Round are way’ in 2020 alongside older brother and actor Austin Haynes. This commercial was very successful, winning several awards including 'Best Casting Featuring Children' at the Casting Directors Association Awards ceremony held at BAFTA in 2021.

Since then, Haynes has appeared in several well known productions including Wolfe, All Creatures Great and Small and Odd Squad. Haynes' film appearances include roles in The Railway Children Return, The Dalesman's Litany and Starve Acre. In 2024, Haynes completed filming on Boxing Biopic Giant, with Pierce Brosnan, again appearing alongside older brother Austin Haynes. Sylvester Stallone and Braden Aftergood are among the executive producers through Balboa Productions.

A keen Leeds United fan, Haynes appeared as the hero in the LUFC Christmas Commercial 'Show Your True Colours' in December 2023, starring alongside Eddie Gray; Archie Gray and Georginio Rutter.

In the summer of 2024, Haynes was cast in a pivotal role in Danny Boyle's 28 Years Later, which was released on 20 June 2025.

Haynes is currently appearing in Small Prophets, directed by Mackenzie Crook.

== Filmography ==
=== Film ===
Key
†	Denotes films that have not yet been released

Year	Title	Role	Notes
2020	Co-op Round Are Way	Busker Boy	
2021	Ali & Ava	School Boy	
2022	The Railway Children Return	Village Child	
2023	Starve Acre	Football boy	
2025	28 Years Later	Young Jimmy	
2025	Giant	Mikey	
TBA	The Dalesman's Litany †	Richard	Lead role
TBA	Pride & Glory	Mikey	Lead role
TBA	Good Lad	Rudi	Lead role

=== Television ===
Year	Title	Role	Notes
2017	The A Word	Child in play area	
2019	Gentleman Jack	Billy Hardcastle	
2020	Last Tango in Halifax	School boy	
2021	Wolfe	Rex	
2021	All Creatures Great & Small	Samuel Ingledew	
2022	Dodger	Orphan	
2022–2023	Hullraisers	Gnome Boy/Theatre Boy	
2023	Emmerdale		
2024	Odd Squad	Agent Opstairs	
2024	Toxic Town		
2026	Small Prophets	Kid	

== Recognition and awards ==
In November 2024 he was awarded 'Yorkshires Young Achiever of the Year' for 'Contribution to the Arts'.
