= Shay Rudolph =

American actress

- Rudolph in 2026
- Born: September 6, 2005 (age 21); San Diego, California, United States
- Occupation: Actress
- Years active: 2017–present

Shay Rudolph (born September 6, 2005) is an American actress known for starring in the Netflix series The Baby-Sitters Club as Stacey McGill. She also starred in Fox's crime-drama television series Lethal Weapon as the daughter of lead character Wesley Cole. She also played the role of guitarist in the music video "You Ruined Nirvana" song by Mckenna Grace. She resides in San Diego, California.

== Filmography ==
=== Film ===
Year	Title	Role	Notes
2017	The Adventures of Thomasina Sawyer	Becky Thatcher	
2019	Less Than Zero	Gisele	TV movie
2020	Rita	Abbey	TV movie
2024	The Present	Emma Diehl	
2026	She Keeps Me Young	Bridget	

=== Television ===
Year	Title	Role	Notes
2018–19	Lethal Weapon	Maya Flynn	9 episodes
2020–2021	The Baby-Sitters Club	Stacey McGill	Main role
2025	Untitled Holes reboot	Hayley	Failed pilot episode
2027	Off Campus	Summer Di Laurentis	Recurring role

=== Music videos ===
Year	Title	Artist
2022	"You Ruined Nirvana"	Mckenna Grace
