= Hope Gap =

2019 film by William Nicholson

- Theatrical release poster
- Directed by: William Nicholson
- Screenplay by: William Nicholson
- Based on: The Retreat from Moscow by William Nicholson
- Produced by: Sarada McDermott; David M. Thompson
- Starring: Annette Bening; Bill Nighy; Josh O'Connor; Aiysha Hart; Ryan McKen; Steven Pacey; Nicholas Burns
- Cinematography: Anna Valdez Hanks
- Edited by: Pia Di Ciaula
- Music by: Alex Heffes
- Production companies: Origin Pictures; Protagonist Pictures; Screen Yorkshire; Lipsync; Sampsonic Media
- Distributed by: Curzon Artificial Eye
- Release dates: 6 September 2019 (TIFF); 28 August 2020 (United Kingdom)
- Running time: 100 minutes
- Country: United Kingdom
- Language: English
- Box office: $1.3 million

Hope Gap is a 2019 British drama film written and directed by William Nicholson, adapted from his 1999 play The Retreat from Moscow. The film stars Annette Bening, Bill Nighy, Josh O'Connor, Aiysha Hart, Ryan McKen, Steven Pacey and Nicholas Burns.

Hope Gap had its world premiere at the Toronto International Film Festival on 6 September 2019 and was released in the United Kingdom on 28 August 2020 by Curzon Artificial Eye.

== Plot ==
Grace and Edward have been married for 29 years and live in a seaside home in Seaford, Sussex, near the chalk cliffs of Hope Gap. Their relationship is strained; Grace is devout, literary, emotionally demanding and physically abusive, often expressing her dissatisfaction with Edward’s passivity. Edward, a timid secondary school history teacher, is withdrawn and unhappy, retreating into silence to avoid conflict.

Their adult son, Jamie, travels from London to visit them for the weekend at Edward’s request. Upon his arrival, Edward privately confesses to Jamie that he intends to leave Grace the following day. He reveals that he has fallen in love with Angela, the mother of a former student, and they have been seeing each other for a year. Jamie is devastated but agrees not to warn his mother.

The next day, while Grace is at church, Edward packs his bags. When she returns, he breaks the news of his planned separation. Grace is blindsided and initially refuses to accept the situation, believing it to be a marital dispute rather than a final decision. Edward insists that there is no hope for reconciliation and leaves to live with Angela.

In the weeks that follow, Grace oscillates between denial, rage, and deep depression. She refuses to sign divorce papers and attempts to manipulate Edward into returning, at one point impulsively acquiring a puppy which she cannot care for. Jamie is frequently called back to Seaford to mediate, finding himself trapped between his mother's volatility and his father's refusal to communicate. Grace eventually tracks down Angela's home and confronts the couple, but the encounter only solidifies Edward's decision. Angela tells Grace that prior to the separation there were three unhappy people, but now there is only one.

Struggling to find meaning, Grace contemplates suicide at the cliffs of Hope Gap. She is stopped by the thought of the lasting trauma it would inflict on Jamie. Slowly, she begins to rebuild her life, finding a sense of purpose by volunteering at a telephone crisis hotline, where she uses her own experience of grief to help others.

Some time later, the family reunites for a final meeting to formalize the divorce. The atmosphere is calm. Grace informs Edward that she is no longer unhappy, but simply "getting there". She gives Edward a copy of the poetry anthology she has been compiling. The film concludes with Jamie walking alone on the cliffs, accompanied by Grace’s voiceover reflecting on "Hope Gap"— the space between the life one hopes for and the reality one must endure.

== Cast ==
- Annette Bening as Grace
- Bill Nighy as Edward
- Josh O'Connor as Jamie
- Aiysha Hart as Jess
- Ryan McKen as Dev
- Steven Pacey as Solicitor
- Nicholas Burns as Gary
- Rose Keegan as Receptionist
- Nicholas Blane as Priest
- Sally Rogers as Angela
- Liam Hadfield as Waiter

== Production ==
The project was announced on October 31, 2017, with William Nicholson directing and writing the story, and Annette Bening and Bill Nighy cast to play the husband and wife at the centre of the film.

Pre-production began on June 11, 2018, with principal photography starting on July 10. Filming occurred in Seaford, Sussex.

== Release ==
In May 2019, Roadside Attractions and Screen Media Films acquired US distribution rights to the film. It had its world premiere at the Toronto International Film Festival on 6 September 2019. It was released in the United States on 6 March 2020. It was released in the United Kingdom on 28 August 2020.

== Reception ==
=== Box office ===
Released amidst the COVID-19 pandemic, Hope Gap opened six months apart in the US and UK, and ultimately grossed $1,398,065 at the box office.

=== Critical response ===
On the review aggregator website Rotten Tomatoes, 63% of 90 critics' reviews are positive. The website's consensus reads: "Annette Bening and Bill Nighy are just about worth the price of admission, but Hope Gap lacks enough depth to really leave an impact." Metacritic, which uses a weighted average, assigned the film a score of 58 out of 100, based on 24 critics, indicating "mixed or average" reviews.
