= Desert Warrior (2025 film) =

2025 film by Rupert Wyatt

- Theatrical release poster
- Directed by: Rupert Wyatt
- Screenplay by: David Self; Rupert Wyatt; Erica Beeney
- Story by: David Self
- Produced by: Jeremy Bolt
- Starring: Anthony Mackie; Aiysha Hart; Sharlto Copley; Ben Kingsley
- Cinematography: Guillermo Garza
- Edited by: Richard Mettler
- Music by: Dan Levy
- Production companies: MBC Studios; AGC Studios; JB Pictures; Studio Mechanical
- Distributed by: Vertical (United States); Empire Entertainment (Saudi Arabia)
- Release dates: September 28, 2025 (Zurich Film Festival); April 24, 2026 (United States)
- Running time: 126 minutes
- Countries: United States; Saudi Arabia
- Language: English
- Budget: $150 million
- Box office: $759,228

Desert Warrior is a 2025 historical action film directed by Rupert Wyatt, who co-wrote the screenplay with Erica Beeney and David Self. The film's cast includes Anthony Mackie, Aiysha Hart, Sharlto Copley, and Ben Kingsley. The story sees an Arabian princess team up with a bandit to confront a ruthless emperor, who wanted the former to be his concubine.

With a $150 million budget, Desert Warrior is the most expensive film to be produced in Saudi Arabia. The project was intended to revitalize the Saudi film industry, with Saudi crew members receiving training for the production. Filming lasted from September 2021 to February 2022. An extended post-production period, including creative conflicts with Wyatt, contributed to delays in the film's release.

Desert Warrior premiered at the Zurich Film Festival on September 28, 2025, and was theatrically released in the United States on April 24, 2026, by Vertical. The film received generally negative reviews from critics and was a box-office bomb, grossing $759,228 against a budget of $150 million.

== Plot ==
During the early 7th century, Emperor Kisra of the Persian Sassanian Empire sought to gain control of Arabia by forcing its kings to send their wives as his concubines. One of them, King Numan of the Lakhmids, refused, and he and his daughter Hind were subsequently chased across the desert by agents of the Sassanian emperor led by the general Jalabzeen. They stumble onto a bandit and desert vagabond named Hanzala who seemed hesitant to help them at first until Numan bribes him with royal gold and subsequently agrees to help them escape from the agents. The agents continue to pursue the trio until they reach the territory of the Shaybani tribe by its chieftain Hani who welcomes Jalabzeen until he convinces him to go away as Numan and Hind are now considered guests in his tribe. Frustrated, Jalabzeen and his men attack a few Shaybani tribesmen later that night, forcing Hani to eventually hand over Numan to Jalabzeen to be taken back to Emperor Kisra to prevent further killings upon the tribe.

The incident at the Shaybani tribe forces Hanzala and the surviving Princess Hind to flee once again, and once finally away, Hanzala teaches Hind basic combat skills to prepare for the fight against the Persian occupation of their land. Meanwhile, Numan was eventually brought back to the royal execution chamber at the Sassanian capital city of Ctesiphon where he was eventually executed for rebellion in front of Emperor Kisra, his head crushed by the hooves of a horse and his corpse eventually dragged to the streets of the city by a camel's cowl. Hanzala and Princess Hind eventually return to the old Lakhmid capital of Hira, now directly controlled by the Sassanian Empire, and while there Hanzala kills the Persian commander and the return of Princess Hind makes the local townspeople rise up against the tyrannical Persian rule.

Hind eventually assumes the title of Queen of the Lakhmids, and word of Numan's brutal execution at Ctesiphon eventually compels the Shaybani and the Ghanim tribes, also resenting Persian overlordship over their lands, to side with her and the Lakhmids. The Kanifa tribe led by its cheiftain Eben, who previously refused Hind and Numan shelter but also resented the Persian overlordship of the Arabian desert, eventually joins the fight when Hind informs them the site of the fight against Persian rule of their lands would take place at the oasis at Ze Qar where water is secured for their men and animals. Eventually, more tribes all over Arabia join the Lakhmids and their allies in their fight against Persian rule, and though tensions existed between the tribes, Hind ensures that their needs are met and their disputes resolved.

Irritated by the gathering of rebellious Arab tribes under the leadership of Queen Hind of the Lakhmids whom he sees as a fugitive, Emperor Kisra eventually sends a huge army of combined Persian regulars and Lakhmid defectors led by none other than the general Jalabzeen to crush the upstart Arab tribal coalition assembling at the oasis at Ze Qar. Jalabzeen's deputy chastises the Arab tribes for their lack of unity and their defiance against the Sassanian emperor until he was scared off by an arrow fired by Hind's deputy Safira, beginning the battle. The Sassanian army outnumbers the Arab coalition army four to one and further reinforced by war elephants, but were suffering from severe thirst and dehydration due to having to march across the desert with lack of water. Nevertheless, they were able to drive and chase the outnumbered Arab tribal forces off the field, eventually killing the Shaybani chieftain Hani, and subsequently gained control of the oasis where they instantly drank its water. Unbeknownst to the Sassanians, the Arabs have already earlier poisoned the oasis, resulting to the Sassanian troops dying of poisoning and the remainder ambushed and killed off by the remaining tribal Arabs hidden in the nearby cliffs and shrubs, with the general Jalabzeen himself killed by Hanzala and Queen Hind.

Having helped win the battle at Ze Qar, and with the independence of the tribes of Arabia restored, Hanzala, now enriched with Sassanian loot, gave his horse to Queen Hind before they eventually parted ways in a positive note. It was revealed that years after the battle Emperor Kisra was himself assassinated through poisoning.

== Cast ==
- Anthony Mackie as Hanzala
- Aiysha Hart as Princess Hind
- Sharlto Copley as Jalabzeen
- Ghassan Massoud as King Numan
- Sami Bouajila as Hani
- Lamis Ammar as Safira the Medicine Woman
- Géza Röhrig as Al Hamerz
- Ben Kingsley as Emperor Kisra
- Numan Acar as Ebn Wael
- Ramsey Faragallah as Ibn Qabisah

== Production ==
Desert Warrior was announced in November 2021 as a film produced by JB Pictures, AGC Studios, Studio Mechanical, and MBC Studios—the Saudi-backed production arm of MBC. Its story originated from David Self, while the screenplay was written by Self, director Rupert Wyatt and his wife Erica Beeney; Self's original script focused on the male bandit Hanzala, while Wyatt and Beeny rewrote the script to center on Princess Hind. Gary Ross provided uncredited rewrites. The cast includes Anthony Mackie and Aiysha Hart as Hanzala and Hind, respectively, alongside Sharlto Copley, Ghassan Massoud, Sami Bouajila, Lamis Ammar, Géza Röhrig, Ben Kingsley, and Numan Acar. It was one of the first major English-language films produced by MBC Studios, and is the largest production to film in Saudi Arabia. MBC saw it as an anchor for the nascent film industry that was being established in the region, where key crewmembers were brought in for the project to effectively train and develop Saudi crews learning about the industry. The crew size was approximately 450–500 people each day.

Principal photography began in September 2021 in Neom, Saudi Arabia, and it was completed by February 2022. The film had a long post-production period, and it planned to seek buyers in the first quarter of 2024, targeting a film festival debut before a wide theatrical release. In October 2024, it was reported that Wyatt had briefly exited the film due to creative differences, but later returned to finish the editing. Guillermo Garza serves as the cinematographer, Richard Mettler serves as editor, and Dan Levy was the composer for the film.

== Release ==
Desert Warrior premiered at the Zurich Film Festival on September 28, 2025. The film was also screened at Saudi Arabia's 5th Red Sea International Film Festival on December 6 that same year.

In February 2026, Vertical acquired the distribution rights to the film, later scheduling it for a theatrical release in the United States on April 24, 2026.

Riders of the Desert (Persian: غارتگران صحرا), a novel by Morteza Esmailzadeh, was written within a month in response to the film Desert Warrior. Aiming to present a historical account of the Battle of Dhi Qar, the work examines the traditions of the Jahiliyyah era and depicts the cultural and civilizational confrontation between ancient Persia and the Arabian Peninsula during that period.

== Reception ==
=== Box office ===
Desert Warrior was released in 1,010 theatres in North America. It made just $472,111 in its opening weekend (a $467 per theatre average), becoming one of the worst domestic openings in history for a major film.

The Saudi-backed film grossed $87,000 in Saudi Arabia in its opening weekend, ranking it at eighth in the country's box office. Across the Middle East, the film earned $227,000.

=== Critical reception ===
On the review aggregator website Rotten Tomatoes, 25% of 24 critics' reviews are positive, with an average rating of 4.7/10. The website's consensus reads: "Narratively bloated, yet emotionally hollow, Desert Warrior's trite storytelling and uninspired performances consistently undermine its impressive visual scope." Metacritic, which uses a weighted average, assigned the film a score of 41 out of 100, based on six critics, indicating "mixed or average" reviews.

Damon Wise of Deadline Hollywood writes that "extraordinary images" were captured by the director and cinematographer, but that the film ultimately turns into "a stodgy, sprawling, feminist, pre-Islamic Gandhi." However, M.N. Miller of Geek Vibes Nation wrote, "Ignore the infamous noise and immerse yourself in an enthralling sword-and-sand spectacle that delivers old-fashioned adventure you can't help but get swept up in."
