= Aiysha Hart =

British actress and screenwriter

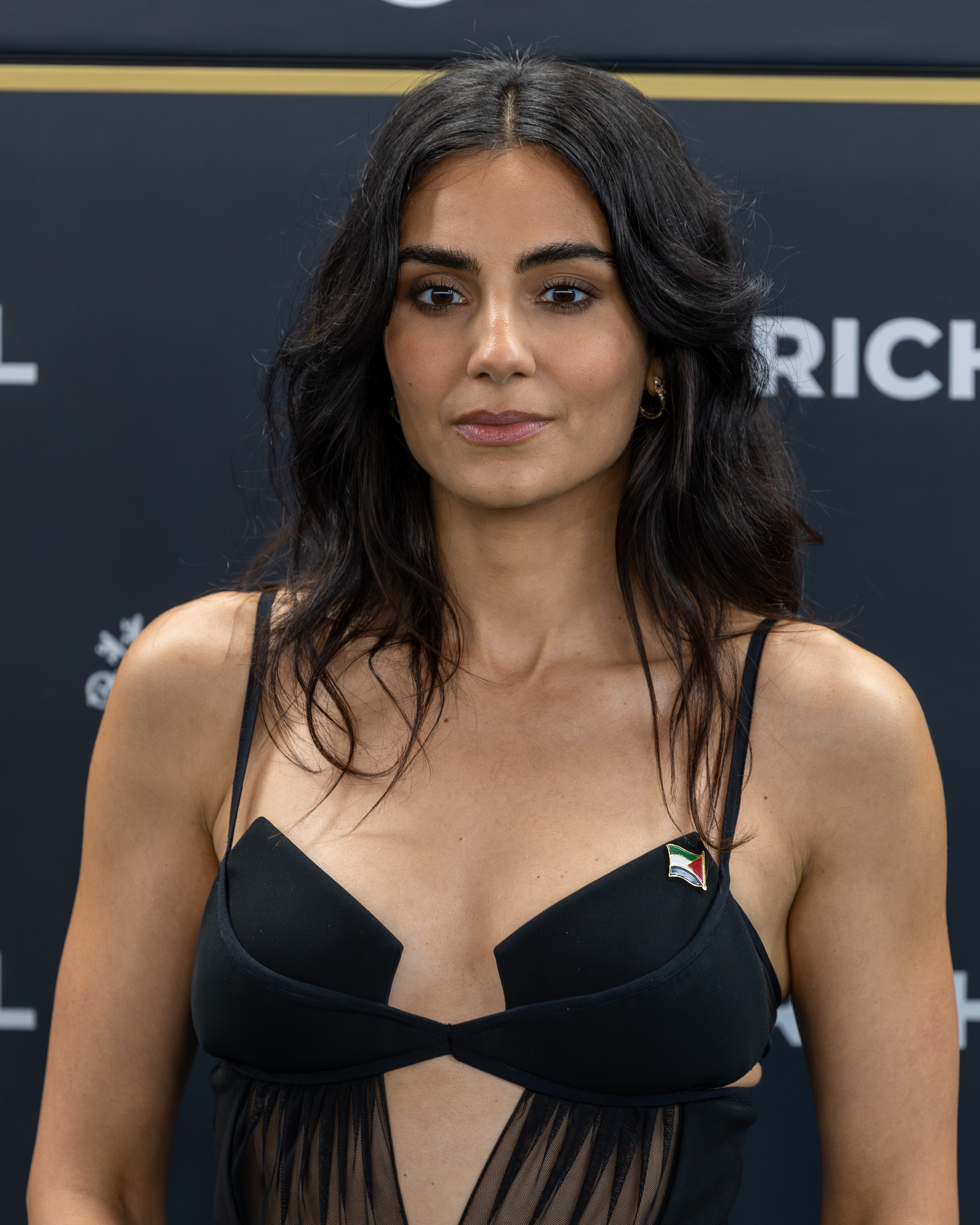
- Hart at the 2025 Zurich Film Festival
- Born: 8 August 1990 (age 36); London, England
- Education: King's College London (BA); Drama Studio London
- Occupation: Actress
- Years active: 2010–present

Aiysha Hart is a British actress, known for her breakout TV roles as Ariadne in the BBC drama series Atlantis and DS Sam Railston in Line of Duty, as well as her film work, including Colette. She also stars as Princess Hind in Desert Warrior.

== Early life ==
Hart's father is from Saudi Arabia and her mother is British. She lived in Saudi Arabia until she was three before moving to the United Kingdom and being raised in Surrey. Hart graduated with First Class Honours in English Literature from King's College London. Hart speaks Arabic "semi-fluently". She briefly considered becoming a lawyer prior to her acting career.

== Activism ==
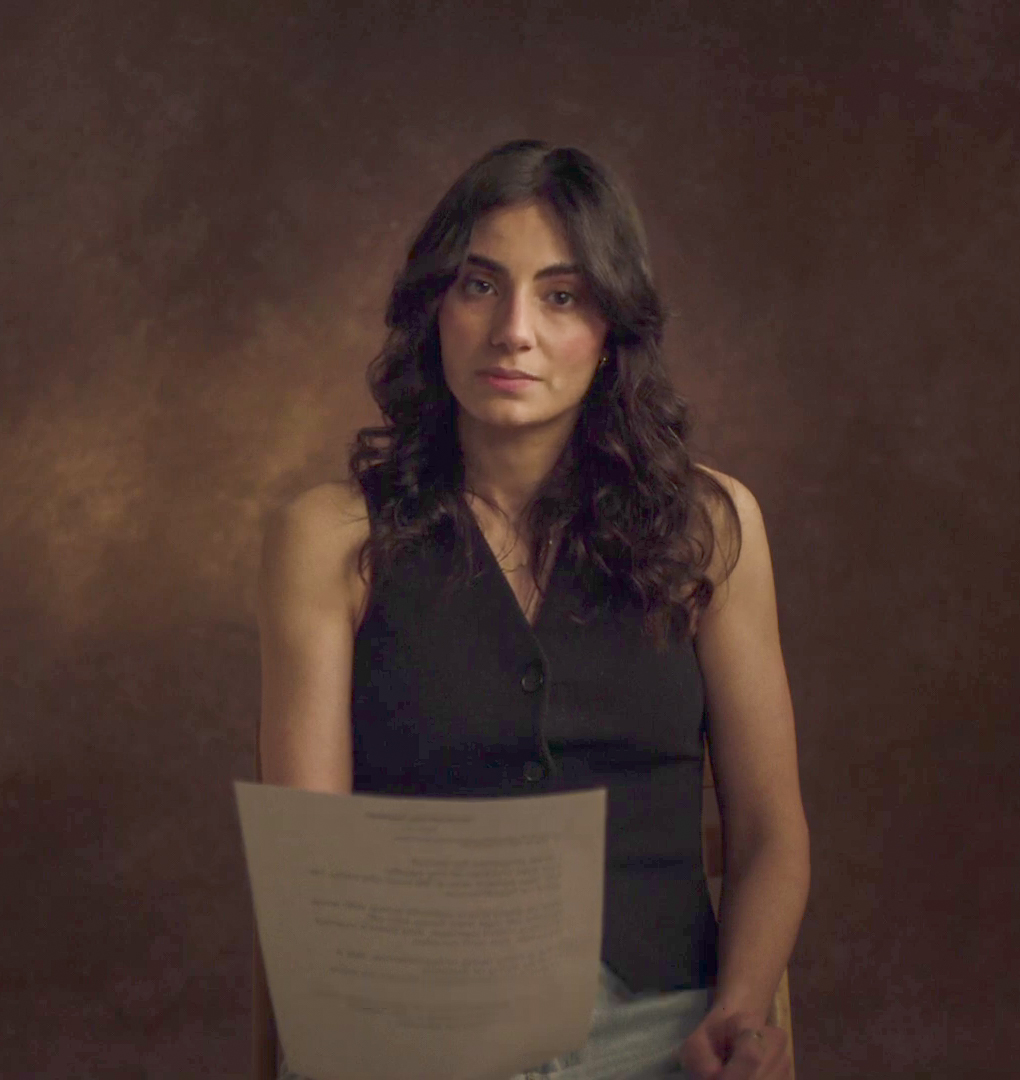
Hart participating in a plea to end the Gaza War in 2024

In September 2025, Hart signed an open pledge with Film Workers for Palestine pledging not to work with Israeli film institutions "that are implicated in genocide and apartheid against the Palestinian people".

== Filmography ==
=== Film ===
Key
| † | Denotes films that have not yet been released |

| Year | Title | Role | Notes |
|---|---|---|---|
| 2013 | Djinn | Sarah | |
| 2014 | Honour | Mona | |
| 2018 | Colette | Polaire | |
| 2019 | Hope Gap | Jess | |
| 2020 | Mogul Mowgli | Bina | |
| 2025 | Dreamers | Atefeh | |
| 2025 | Salvable | Fay | |
| 2025 | Desert Warrior | Princess Hind | |
| 2027 | The Thomas Crown Affair † | TBA | Post-production |
| TBA | The Last Disturbance of Madeline Hynde † | TBA | Post-production |

=== Television ===
| Year | Title | Role | Notes |
|---|---|---|---|
| 2013–2015 | Atlantis | Ariadne | Main cast; 22 episodes |
| 2016 | New Blood | Leila | Main cast; 7 episodes |
| 2016–2021 | Line of Duty | DS Sam Railston | Recurring role (seasons 3–6) |
| 2018–2022 | A Discovery of Witches | Miriam | Main cast; 17 episodes |
| 2020 | Make Me Famous | Kelly | Television film |
| 2021–2024 | We Are Lady Parts | Noor | Supporting cast; 8 episodes |
| 2025 | Down Cemetery Road | Paula | |
