= Unforgivable (2025 film) =

2025 British drama television film

- Genre: Drama
- Written by: Jimmy McGovern
- Directed by: Julia Ford
- Starring: Anna Friel; Bobby Schofield; Mark Womack; Austin Haynes; David Threlfall; Anna Maxwell Martin
- Music by: Amelia Warner
- Country of origin: United Kingdom
- Original language: English

Production
- Executive producers: Jimmy McGovern; Colin McKeown; Nawfal Faizullah; Katherine Bond
- Producer: Donna Molloy
- Cinematography: Phil Wood
- Editor: Alex Beards
- Running time: 90 minutes
- Production company: LA Productions

Original release
- Network: BBC Two
- Release: 24 July 2025

Unforgivable is a 2025 British drama television film dealing with family sexual abuse, directed by Julia Ford, written by Jimmy McGovern, and starring Anna Friel, Bobby Schofield, Mark Womack, Austin Haynes, David Threlfall and Anna Maxwell Martin. It aired on BBC Two and BBC iPlayer on 24 July 2025.

== Cast ==
- Anna Friel as Anna MacKinney
- Anna Maxwell Martin as Katherine Farrell
- Bobby Schofield as Joe Mitchell
- Austin Haynes as Tom MacKinney
- Finn McParland as Peter MacKinney Jnr.
- Jonas Armstrong as Peter MacKinney Snr.
- David Threlfall as Brian Mitchell
- Mark Womack as Paul Patterson
- Phina Oruche as Jodie Taylor
- Paddy Rowan as Sammy Mcveigh

== Production ==
The project was written by Jimmy McGovern and directed by Julia Ford, with Donna Molloy as producer. McGovern and Colin McKeown, from LA Productions, were executive producers, with Nawfal Faizullah and Katherine Bond.

The cast for the single 90-minute drama was led by Bobby Schofield and Anna Friel, with support from Anna Maxwell Martin, David Threlfall, Austin Haynes and Mark Womack, with Phina Oruche and Finn McParland.

The production was set and filmed in Liverpool, with shooting starting in September 2024. First look images from the set were released in July 2025.

== Broadcast ==
It was broadcast on 24 July 2025 on BBC Two and BBC iPlayer.

== Reception ==
Reviewing the programme for The Guardian, Lucy Mangan awarded it five stars out of five, praising the "faultless" performances of the cast, Womack in particular, who she described as "mesmeric". Mangan also noted that Unforgivable was free of "the agitprop that can creep into McGovern's always impassioned work", despite the fraught subject of family sexual abuse.

Schofield and Friel both won in acting categories at the 2026 Royal Television Society Programme Awards.
