= Stuart Ford (entertainment executive) =

British film producer

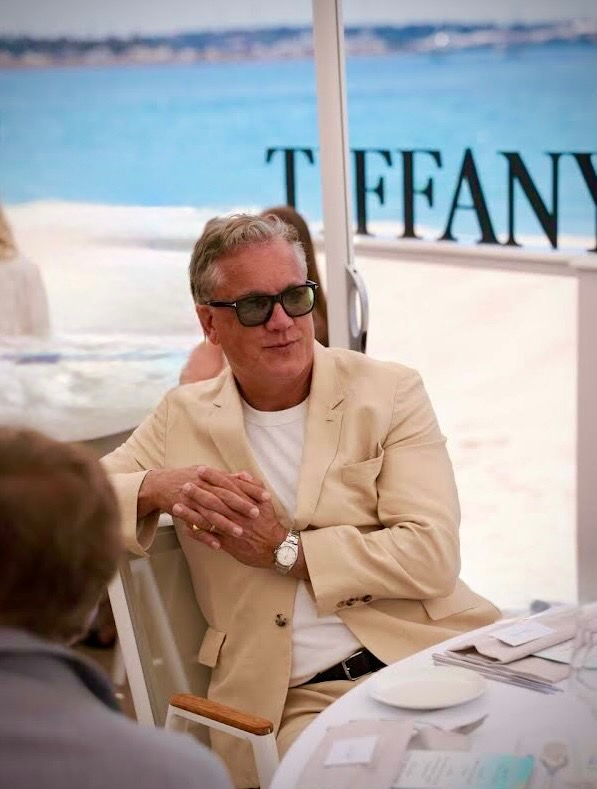
- Stuart Ford at the Cannes Film Festival in 2025

Stuart Ford is a British-born film and television producer based in Los Angeles. He is a member of the executive branch of the Academy of Motion Picture Arts and Sciences, the British Academy of Film and Television Arts and the Television Academy. He was the recipient of Variety's Billion Dollar Producer award in 2023.

== Education ==
Ford was educated at the Liverpool Blue Coat School, and later on he obtained both a BA and an MA in Law from St. Edmund Hall, Oxford University.

== Professional career ==
Los Angeles based Stuart Ford is chairman and chief executive officer of AGC Studios. UK born and Oxford University educated, Ford is a former entertainment attorney and Miramax Films senior studio executive who in 2007 founded IM Global, which over the next ten years he built into one of the industry's leading independent film and television production, financing and sales platforms with ancillary talent management and corporate publicity businesses across North America, South East Asia, India, Latin America and Europe.

In February 2018 Ford launched so-called "super-indie" AGC Studios, an international film and television production and licensing company that develops, produces, finances and globally licenses a diverse portfolio of feature films, scripted, unscripted and factual content with major corporate backing from Silicon Valley, Latin America and the Middle East. Since its inception AGC has been involved with more than 50 major film and television productions.

As a producer and financier Ford has worked with a huge array of leading directors such as Martin Scorsese, Gary Ross, Mel Gibson, Ron Howard, Doug Liman, Neil Burger, James Wan, Scott Derrickson, Roland Emmerich, Tom Ford and Richard Linklater. He has produced or executive produced more than seventy films and television shows and has assembled in excess of $2 billion in independent production financing from North America, India, China, Latin America and the Middle East during his career.

Ford has also established AGC Television as an independent studio producing scripted shows. Its series "Those About To Die" had a $140m budget for its first season.

Ford has worked extensively in the development and structuring of international film financing and distribution strategies. In addition to his work on Hollywood‑based productions, he has established companies focused on Latin American, Chinese‑language, and Indian (Bollywood) film distribution, as well as the Beijing‑based corporate communications firm Go Global and the Latinx‑focused management company Valor Entertainment. Ford has also been involved in Arabic‑language film and television projects, serving as an executive producer and distributor on productions including the thriller Al Kameen and the large‑scale historical feature Desert Warrior.

Ford has also established AGC Unwritten as a prominent player in the non-fiction arena. The subsidiaries successes include global phenomena "The Tinder Swindler."

Ford is a member of the Academy of Motion Picture Arts and Sciences, the Television Academy as well as the British Academy of Film and Television Arts.

== Personal life ==
Ford lives in Los Angeles with his wife and two sons.

== Awards ==
- 50 most influential individuals in global cinema: Stuart Ford - The Guardian 2010
- Variety Award for Achievement in International Film: Stuart Ford, IM Global - Variety 2015
- Variety 500, 500 Most Important People in Global Media: Stuart Ford - 2021, 2022, 2023
- Variety Billion Dollar Producer: Stuart Ford - 2023

== Filmography ==
- Giant - Producer
- The Order - Executive Producer
- Woman of the Hour - Executive Producer
- The Silent Hour - Executive Producer
- Hit Man - Executive Producer
- The Present - Executive Producer
- Poolman - Executive Producer
- Freelance - Executive Producer
- The Perfect Find - Executive Producer
- Consecration - Executive Producer
- Watcher - Executive Producer
- Moonfall - Executive Producer
- The Tinder Swindler - Executive Producer
- Queenpins - Executive Producer
- Lady Boss: The Jackie Collins Story - Executive Producer
- Breaking News in Yuba County - Executive Producer
- Locked Down - Executive Producer
- Voyagers - executive producer
- The Secrets We Keep (2020) - producer
- The Rhythm Section (2020) - executive producer
- War of the Worlds (2019) Seasons 1, 2, and 3 - executive producer
- Midway (2019) - executive producer
- Serenity - (2019) executive producer
- The Professor (2018) - executive producer
- Boarding School - (2018) executive producer
- Zoe (2018) - executive producer
- Hacksaw Ridge (2016) - executive producer
- Free State of Jones (2016) - executive producer
- Silence (2016) - executive producer
- Incarnate (2016) - executive producer
- The Autopsy of Jane Doe (2016) - executive producer
- Viral (2016) - executive producer
- Collide (2016) - executive producer
- Fifty Shades of Black (2016) - executive producer
- Southside With You (2016) - executive producer
- Secret in Their Eyes (2015) - executive producer
- Demonic (2015) - producer
- Area 51 (2015) - executive producer
- Grace: The Possession (2014) - executive producer
- Revenge of the Green Dragons (2014) - producer
- Enchanted Kingdom 3D (2014) (Documentary) - executive producer
- A Haunted House 2 (2014) - executive producer
- 13 Sins (2014) - executive producer
- Vampire Academy (2014) - executive producer
- Justin Bieber's Believe (2013) (Documentary) - Executive producer
- Walking with Dinosaurs 3D (2013) - executive producer
- Plush (2013) - producer
- Afflicted (2013) - executive producer
- Locke (2013) executive producer
- The Sacrament (2013) - executive producer
- Paranoia (2013) - executive producer
- Hummingbird (2013) - executive producer
- Dead Man Down (2013) - executive producer
- Welcome to the Punch (2013) - executive producer
- A Haunted House (2013) - executive producer
- Bullet to the Head (2012) - executive producer
- Blood (2012) - executive producer
- Dredd (2012) - executive producer
- Safe (2012) - executive producer
- The Babymakers (2012) - executive producer
- 44 Inch Chest (2009) - executive producer
- Goal II: Living the Dream (2007) - executive producer
- Goal! (film) - Executive Producer
- The Official Film of the 2006 FIFA World Cup (TM) (2006) (Video documentary) - executive producer
- Summer Love (2006) - executive producer
