= The Present (2024 film) =

Film by Christian Ditter

- Theatrical release poster
- Directed by: Christian Ditter
- Written by: Jay Martel
- Produced by: Stuart Ford; Linda McDonough; Marcei A. Brown; Jessica Malanaphy
- Starring: Isla Fisher; Greg Kinnear; Easton Rocket; Shay Rudolph; Mason Shea Joyce; Ryan Guzman
- Cinematography: Jon Chema
- Edited by: Josie Azzam; Kristine McPherson
- Music by: Fil Eisler
- Production companies: AGC Studios; CatchLight Studios
- Distributed by: Gravitas Ventures
- Release dates: May 24, 2024 (United Kingdom); June 14, 2024 (United States)
- Running time: 87 minutes
- Country: United States
- Language: English
- Box office: $8,254

The Present is a 2024 American family comedy film directed by Christian Ditter and written by Jay Martel. It stars Isla Fisher, Greg Kinnear, Easton Rocket, Shay Rudolph, Mason Shea Joyce, and Ryan Guzman. The plot revolves around Taylor Diehl, a young boy who discovers that a newly inherited grandfather clock can be used to turn back time 12 hours, which he does repeatedly in the hopes of preventing his parents' impending separation.

It was released in the United Kingdom on May 24, 2024, and on June 14 in the United States.

== Plot ==
Taylor Diehl is a nonverbal boy who finds himself consumed by the emotional turmoil of his family’s impending separation. Through an inscription he reads on the newly arrived family heirloom—his grandfather's old clock—he discovers it holds the extraordinary ability to turn back time by 12 hours, so he sees a glimmer of hope.

Determined to alter the course of his family’s fate, Taylor decides to rewind the clock to the morning of the fateful day when his parents announce their separation. As he embarks on this quest to mend his family, he soon realizes that his initial plans to simply reset the day are far more complicated than he anticipated. Discovering his mother Jen has interest in Richard from her spinning class, the hypersensitive, likely 'on the spectrum' Taylor tries to sabotage the connection. He startles a driver, causing him to accidentally crash into Robert's flashy convertible. He also manages to expose him to nuts on their lunch date, so it ends soon after Jen stabs him with his EpiPen.

Each attempt to alter the present not only leads to frustrating failures but also brings unforeseen consequences. Recognizing the limitations of his efforts, Taylor seeks the assistance of his older sister Emma, who provides a logical perspective. He lets her know the secret truth of the clock, revealing he has already reset this day over 20 times. On one of the day reboots, they enlist their younger brother Max, who approaches their predicament with youthful exuberance. Together, the siblings hatch increasingly elaborate schemes to harness the clock's power, resorting to creative yet risky solutions in their desperate bid to save their parents’ marriage.

With each jump back in time, they are ignited by hope but also face the harsh reality that the clock is gradually aging and becoming more physically fragile. It becomes a race against time as they grapple with the possibility that every use of the clock may be one step closer to its ultimate demise. As they navigate their unravelling family dynamics, the children are forced to confront a painful truth: despite their best efforts to control the situation, some things simply cannot be changed. Throughout their journey, they learn profound lessons about the importance of family bonds, acceptance, and the painful yet necessary understanding of what is truly within their power to influence.

As the clock ticks down, the siblings must reconcile their desires with the inevitable reality of life, ultimately discovering that sometimes the most valuable moments are found not in changing the past, but in embracing the present.

== Cast ==
- Isla Fisher as Jen Diehl
- Greg Kinnear as Eric Diehl
- Easton Rocket Sweda as Taylor Diehl
- Shay Rudolph as Emma Diehl
- Mason Shea Joyce as Max Diehl
- Ryan Guzman as Richard Addison
- Arturo Castro as Dr. Polhemus
- Alphonso McAuley as Devan Andrews

== Production ==
Production on the film began in Los Angeles in May 2022. Ross Butler was initially cast in the role portrayed by Guzman.

== Release ==
The Present was released in the UK and Ireland by Verve Pictures on May 24, 2024. Gravitas Ventures released the film in the US on June 14, 2024. In the UK it grossed $4,581, and $3,673 in Russia, for a total of $8,254.

== Reception ==
On the review aggregator website Rotten Tomatoes, 69% of 13 critics' reviews are positive, with an average rating of 5.2/10.

== See also ==
- List of films featuring time loops
