= She Keeps Me Young =

2026 American comedy film

- Directed by: Doron Max Hagay
- Written by: Doron Max Hagay; Blair Beeken; Katy Fullan
- Produced by: Neil Champagne; Nicole Crespo; Graham Mason
- Starring: Patti Harrison; Kate Berlant; John Early; Blair Beeken; Katy Fullan; Shay Rudolph
- Cinematography: Joshua Hill
- Edited by: Maya Tippett
- Music by: Andrea Schiavelli
- Production companies: Tinygiant; International Pigeon Production; Velodrome; Streeterville Productions
- Release date: June 4, 2026 (Tribeca)
- Running time: 91 minutes
- Country: United States
- Language: English

She Keeps Me Young is a 2026 American black comedy film directed by Doron Max Hagay in his directorial debut from a screenplay by Hagay, Blair Beeken and Katy Fullan. It stars Patti Harrison, Kate Berlant, John Early, Blair Beeken, Katy Fullan and Shay Rudolph.

It had its world premiere at the Tribeca Festival on June 4, 2026.

== Premise ==
Michelle floats through life until a surprising connection with a high schooler challenges her friendship with her best friend.

== Cast ==
- Blair Beeken as Michelle
- Katy Fullan as Kelly
- Shay Rudolph as Bridget
- Patti Harrison
- Kate Berlant
- John Early
- Mike Mitchell as Rocky
- Ayden Mayeri
- Nik Dodani
- Greta Titelman

== Production ==
In March 2025, it was announced Patti Harrison, Kate Berlant, John Early, Blair Beeken, Katy Fullan, Shay Rudolph, Ayden Mayeri, Nik Dodani and Greta Titelman had joined the cast of the film, with Doron Max Hagay directing from a screenplay he co-wrote with Beeken and Fullan.

== Release ==
It had its world premiere at the Tribeca Festival on June 4, 2026.
