= The Secrets We Keep =

2020 American thriller drama film

- Official poster
- Directed by: Yuval Adler
- Written by: Ryan Covington; Yuval Adler
- Produced by: Lorenzo di Bonaventura; Stuart Ford; Erik Howsam; Adam Riback; Greg Shapiro
- Starring: Noomi Rapace; Joel Kinnaman; Chris Messina
- Cinematography: Kolja Brandt
- Edited by: Richard Mettler
- Music by: John Paesano
- Production companies: AGC Studios; Fibonacci Films; Image Nation Abu Dhabi; dB Pictures; Echo Lake Entertainment
- Distributed by: Bleecker Street
- Release date: September 16, 2020
- Running time: 97 minutes
- Country: United States
- Language: English
- Budget: $7.2 million
- Box office: $615,233

The Secrets We Keep is a 2020 American thriller film directed by Yuval Adler and written by Adler and Ryan Covington. The film stars Noomi Rapace, Joel Kinnaman, and Chris Messina, and follows a woman who kidnaps and interrogates the man she believes he committed heinous war crimes during World War II.

The Secrets We Keep was released theatrically in the United States via a limited release on September 16, 2020, followed by video on demand release on October 16, 2020, by Bleecker Street.

== Plot ==
In post-World War II America, Maja Reid is a Romanian refugee who has built a new life with her American husband, Lewis, and their young son, Patrick, but she is still haunted by her dark memories of the war, still having nightmares. While walking on the street, she recognizes a man who she believes is a former German soldier she encountered 15 years before. She tails him to the house where she sees that he has a wife and two children. The next day, on the pretext that her car broke down, Maja knocks the man out and puts him in the trunk.

Returning to the house, Maja tells Lewis her memories, saying that she and some other women escaped to Romania where the SS soldiers found them and murdered several of them. She then admits that she has put the man, who she thinks is a Nazi war criminal, in the trunk of their car, further disturbing Lewis. The two of them then bring the man to the basement and tie him up in a chair. There, Maja interrogates the man who insists that his name is Thomas Steinmann and that he is Swiss but Maja disputes him, telling him that his name is “Karl” and recounting the background of his war crimes. Thomas attempts to escape and yells for help at the front door but Lewis incapacitates him. When one of the neighbors named Jim is awakened by Thomas's yell, Maja convinces him that it came from the street. The next day the neighbor accompanied by police and Thomas's wife, Rachel, are going house to house, searching for Rachel's husband and the source of the screaming the night before. At the clinic where Lewis is working, he looks up a document about Thomas, stating that he is indeed a native from Switzerland.

At the house, Thomas continues to deny Maja's allegations of Thomas's crimes until she forces him to say "Zigeunerfotze" (German word for "Gypsy Cunt"). Throughout the film, a series of flashbacks reveal the German soldiers killing and raping the women. She reveals that her sister Miriah was among the victims but doesn't remember how she got away and her sister was shot. When Thomas is confronted by Lewis, he tells him that he was in Zürich for the entire duration of the war and also tells him the name of his acquaintances to prove his whereabouts during the war. Thomas added that he became a naturalized citizen of the United States after he married Rachel, and promises that he will not go to the police because he forged a travel visa document in order to stay in the U.S.

Maja pays a visit to Rachel at her home, where she discovers the wedding ring she wears has a Star of David engraved on the inside. Believing that Thomas stole the ring from a Jewish victim, Maja goes back to her home to force Thomas to tell her his last name but then Thomas attempts to shoot her with a gun he had hidden earlier but misses. He continues to insist his name is Thomas but then she sees his wedding band. She cuts off his finger and takes his wedding band with the same Star of David inside that is similar to Rachel's wedding band. Meanwhile, Lewis plans to release Thomas, believing that he won't go to the police, Maja continues to demand that Thomas confess to his war crimes. Maja visits Rachel again at her home where Rachel tells her that Thomas does not like to discuss his past war experiences or his family.

Maja and Lewis then bring Thomas to the outskirts of town where Maja previously dug a pit and make Thomas kneel in front of the pit. Maja threatens to shoot him if he does not tell her the truth. Maja recalls the memories of witnessing soldiers raping and killing women during the war and leaving her sister behind. Thomas, feeling great remorse, eventually confesses his crimes, telling Maja he and the other soldiers were on amphetamines and had been up for five nights. They acted quickly and in a frenzy as the Russians were closing in. He is horrified, not believing he could do what he had done; he was present during the murders and tells Maja she never ran away, as she had always believed but she instead was left for dead. When he says "I did it", Lewis executes him out of rage. Maja and Lewis bury Thomas in the pit. They go home, clean their basement and bury their secrets. Later they celebrate the Fourth of July together with Rachel and their friends.

== Cast ==
- Noomi Rapace as Maja Reid
- Joel Kinnaman as Thomas Steinman
- Chris Messina as Lewis Reid
- Amy Seimetz as Rachel Steinman
- Jackson Dean Vincent as Patrick Reid
- Miluette Nalin as Miriah
- Madison Paige Jones as Annabel Steinman
- Jeff Pope as Jim White
- David Maldonado as Officer Brouwer
- Ed Amatrudo as Albert Sonnderquist
- Victoria Hill as Claire

== Production ==
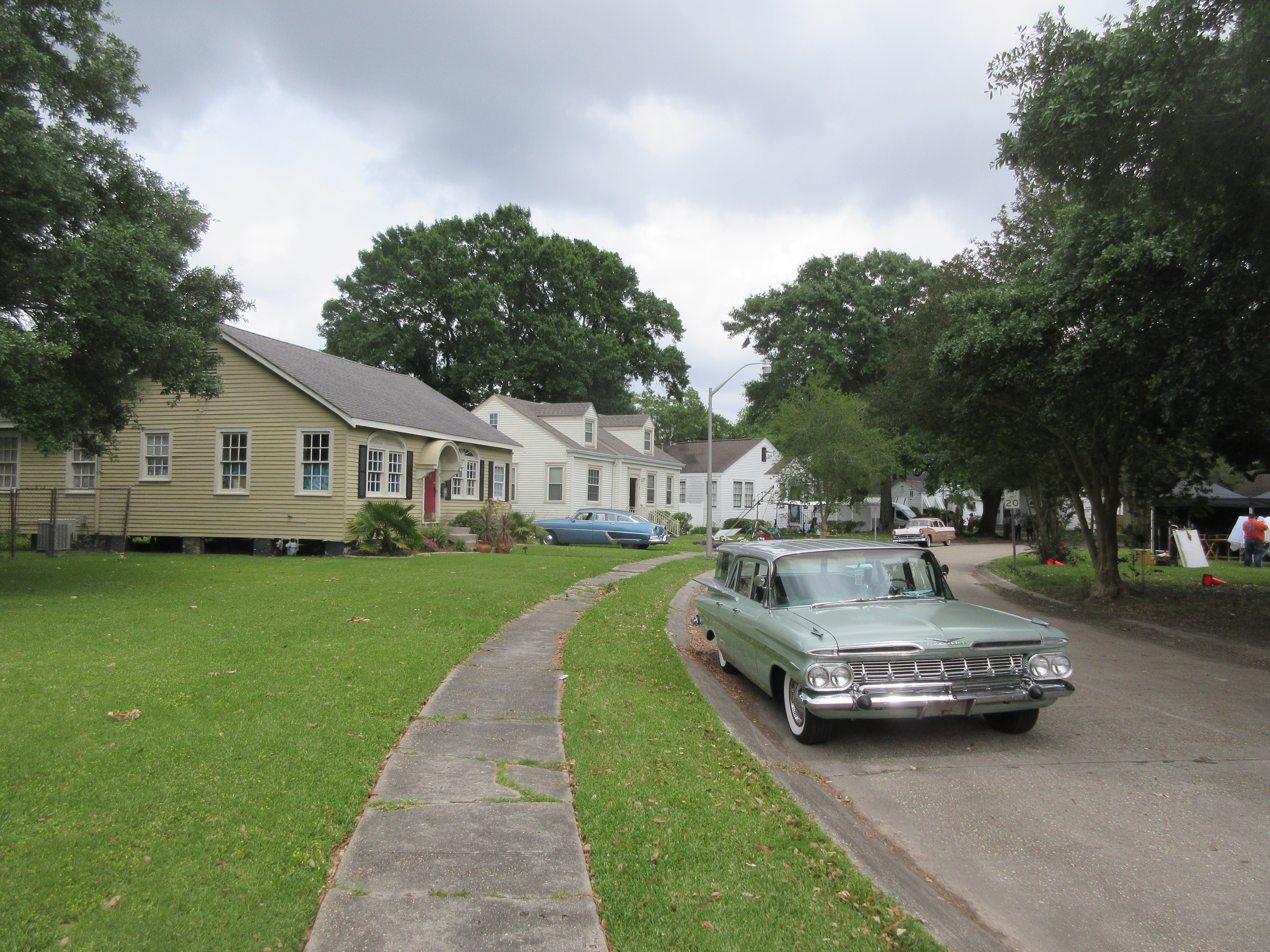
Set up for outdoor film shoot in Jefferson, Louisiana April 2019.

In November 2018, it was announced Noomi Rapace and Joel Kinnaman had joined the cast of the film, with Yuval Adler directing from a screenplay by Ryan Covington. Lorenzo di Bonaventura, Erik Howsam, Greg Shapiro and Adam Riback will serve as producers on the film, under their Di Bonaventura Pictures, AGC Studios and Echo Lake Entertainment banners, respectively. In April 2019, Amy Seimetz and Chris Messina joined the cast of the film, with production beginning that same month.

The character of Maja was originally conceived as a Jewish Holocaust survivor. Director and co-writer Yuval Adler found the premise a little stale, and began talking to Rapace (hoping to find something from her personal life to freshen up the story). To Adler's surprise, Rapace revealed that she is possibly of Romani descent on her father's side. This inspired Adler into changing Maja from a Jewish woman to a Romani woman. Adler felt that the change was great "because this is a story [the Romani trauma of the Holocaust] that you usually don't see". Adler based the incident, that Maja lives through during the war, on an actual war crime that happened in Eastern Romania.

== Release ==
In May 2020, Bleecker Street acquired U.S. distribution rights to the film. It was released in a limited release on September 16, 2020, followed by a video on demand release on October 16, 2020.

== Critical response ==
On Rotten Tomatoes, the film has an approval rating of 63% based on reviews from 60 critics, an average rating of 5.9/10. The site's critical consensus reads, "The Secrets We Keep handles its more serious themes indelicately, but manages to offer some entertaining -- albeit implausible -- B-movie thrills." On Metacritic, the film has a weighted average score of 48 out of 100, based on reviews from 14 critics, indicating "mixed or average reviews".

Dennis Harvey of Variety wrote: "This Death and the Maiden like suspense drama is neither fully convincing nor particularly original, its narrative running a course that feels somewhat predictable from the outset. But it's still strong enough to be effective."
