= Jason Wong =

British actor (born 1986)

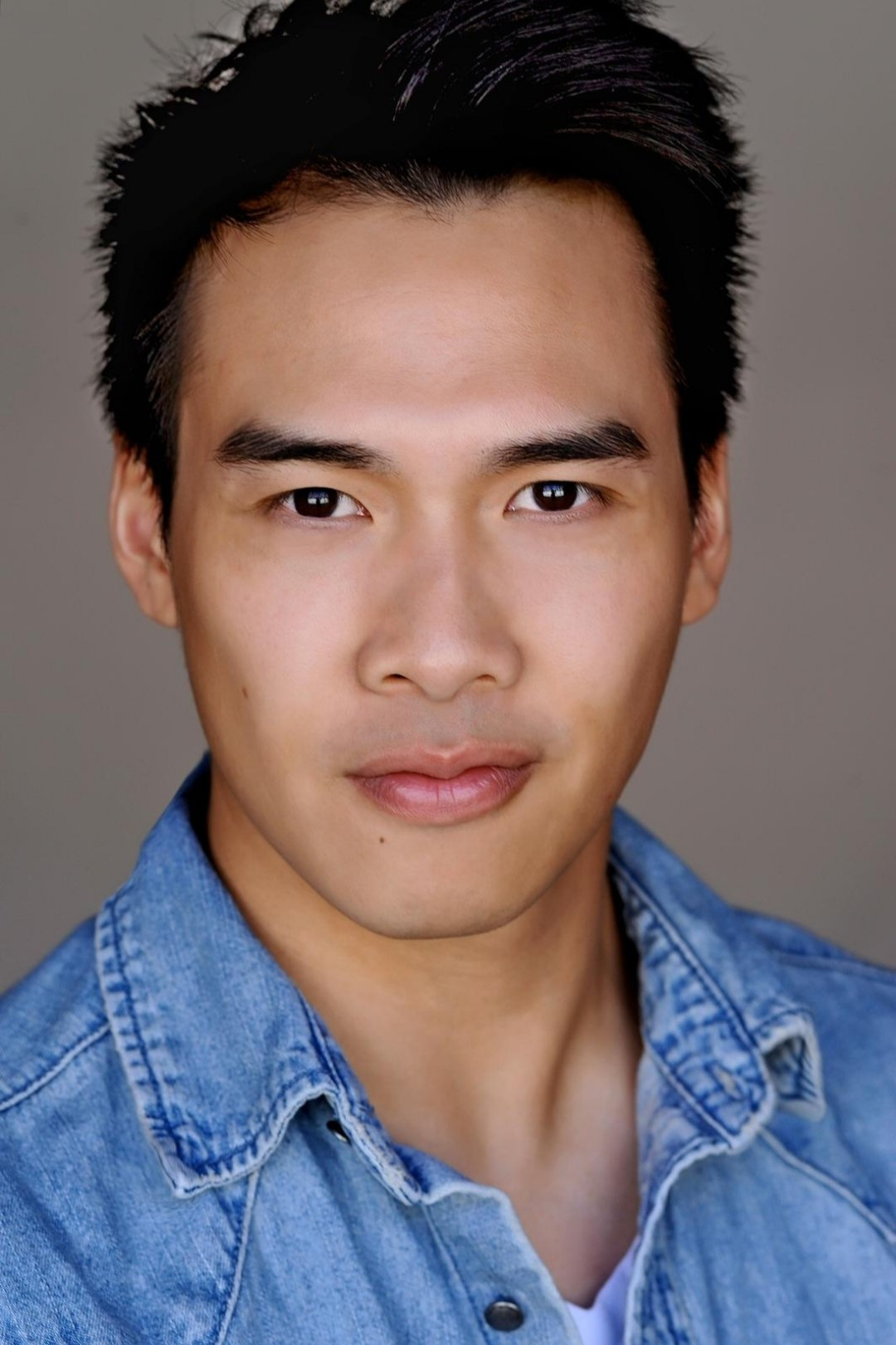
- Born: 24 March 1986 (age 40); London, England
- Education: Royal Central School of Speech and Drama
- Occupation: Actor
- Years active: 2010–present

Jason Wong (born 24 March 1986) is a British actor. He has appeared in television shows including Missing (2012), Chimerica (2019) and Silent Witness (2021), as well as feature films such as The Gentlemen (2019), Wrath of Man (2021), The 355 (2022), Guy Ritchie's The Covenant (2023) and Dungeons & Dragons: Honor Among Thieves (2023).

== Early life ==
Wong was born in London, England to a Chinese Malaysian father and a Chinese Singaporean mother. He grew up in Harrow Road, West London, and graduated from the Royal Central School of Speech and Drama. Before this he attended North Westminster Community School, a comprehensive which has since shut down.

== Career ==
In the summer of the year 1996, aged 9 years old, Wong played ‘Shivra’ the ‘Cold One’ character as part of representing a group of 12 fictional Weather inspired characters, all known as the ‘WeatherGens’ who were all used in sponsorship by PowerGen in the lead up to the forecasts for ITV National Weather where his first on screen appearance was broadcast on the 20th November 1996 to which lasted for over 5 years until the 19th of October 2001.

In 2012, Wong was cast on the American Broadcasting Company series Missing.

In 2014, he co-starred in the feature film Jarhead 2: Field of Fire.

Wong also starred in the crime-drama Panic with David Gyasi, released in 2016, and has appeared in the crime drama Strangers, broadcast on ITV in 2018.

He appeared in the Channel 4 miniseries Chimerica, released in the spring of 2019, and played the role of Phuc in The Gentlemen, which was theatrically released in 2020.

He joined BBC's Silent Witness in 2021 for Series 24 only as regular Adam Yuen. On 13 May 2021, Wong was cast as Dralas in Dungeons & Dragons: Honor Among Thieves.

Jason Wong starred alongside Jake Gyllenhaal in Guy Ritchie's The Covenant. Shortly after, Wong was cast as the lead antagonist Nile the Scorpio assassin in the much-anticipated third season of Alex Rider. In 2025, he starred in Mutiny and reunited with Guy Ritchie for In the Grey.

== Filmography ==
=== Film ===
Year	Title	Role	Notes
2026	Mutiny	Taran	
2026	In the Grey	Gucci	
2023	Guy Ritchie's The Covenant	Joshua "JJ" Jung	
2023	Dungeons & Dragons: Honor Among Thieves	Dralas	
2022	The 355	Stevens	
2021	Swipe Right	Male Friend on Phone	Short
2021	Wrath of Man	FBI Agent Okey	
2019	The Gentlemen	Phuc	
2019	Intrigo: Dear Agnes	Benjamin Delgado	
2018	Solo: A Star Wars Story	Weapons Check Enforcer	
2014	Panic	Dao	
2014	Jarhead 2: Field of Fire	Li	
2014	Asylum	Lim	Video
2013	Redemption	Chinese Guy	Video
2010	Rapture	Kyou	Short

=== Television ===
Year	Title	Roles	Notes
2024	Alex Rider	Nile	8 episodes
2023	Warrior	Ming Yu	2 episodes
2021	Silent Witness	Dr. Adam Yuen	4 episodes
2021	Midsomer Murders	Stephan Ashworth	1 episode
2019	Chimerica	Zhao	3 episodes
2018	White Dragon	Kai	6 episodes
2014	24: Live Another Day	Agent McRoberts	1 episode
2012	Missing	Fitzpatrick	7 episodes
2010	Spirit Warriors	Howler	1 episode
