= Giant (2025 film) =

2025 film by Rowan Athale

- UK theatrical release poster
- Directed by: Rowan Athale
- Written by: Rowan Athale
- Produced by: Stuart Ford; Mark Lane; Kevin Sampson
- Starring: Amir El-Masry; Pierce Brosnan; Katherine Dow Blyton; Austin Haynes; Arian Nik; Ali Saleh; Ghaith Saleh
- Cinematography: Larry Smith
- Production companies: Balboa Productions; AGC Studios; Tea Shop Productions; White Star Productions
- Distributed by: True Brit Entertainment (United Kingdom); Vertical (United States)
- Release dates: October 18, 2025 (BFI London Film Festival); January 9, 2026 (United Kingdom); May 22, 2026 (United States)
- Running time: 110 minutes
- Countries: United Kingdom; United States
- Language: English
- Box office: $1.5 million

Giant is a 2025 biographical sports drama film written and directed by Rowan Athale, based on the relationship between boxer Naseem Hamed and his trainer Brendan Ingle. It stars Amir El-Masry as Hamed and Pierce Brosnan as Ingle.

A British and American co-production, the film premiered at the 2025 BFI London Film Festival, and was released in the United Kingdom on January 9, 2026 to mixed reviews.

== Cast ==
- Amir El-Masry as Naseem Hamed
  - Ali Saleh as Naseem Hamed (age 12)
  - Ghaith Saleh as Naseem Hamed (age 7)
- Pierce Brosnan as Brendan Ingle
- Katherine Dow Blyton as Alma Ingle
- Olivia Barrowclough as Vicki Quinn
- Elika Ashoori as Caira Hamed
- Tobi Bakare as Vuyani Bungu
- Austin Haynes as Trev
- Rocco Haynes as Mikey
- Oliver Joseph Brooke as Wembley Announcer
- Arian Nik as Riath Hamed
- Big Jake as a class extra
- Naveed Choudhry as Wilfredo Vazquez
- Kelvin Ade as Harry Stevens.
- Mehdi Mangoli as Sal Hamed

== Production ==
=== Development ===
The film is written and directed by Rowan Athale. AGC Studios were in development on the project in 2020. It was moving forward in January 2023, with Paddy Considine and Mena Massoud set to star.

Sylvester Stallone and Braden Aftergood are among the executive producers through Balboa Productions. It is produced by Mark Lane of Tea Shop Productions and Kevin Sampson of White Star Productions. AGC Studios and BondIt Media Capital are financing the film. AGC chairman and CEO Stuart Ford will also produce.

=== Casting ===
In April 2024, Amir El-Masry and Pierce Brosnan were cast as Prince Naseem and his coach Brendan Ingle. Later that month, Katherine Dow Blyton, Austin Haynes, Rocco Haynes and Arian Nik joined the cast.

=== Filming ===
Principal photography began in Leeds in April 2024. First look images from the set were reported in April 2024, showing Brosnan in character.

== Release ==
=== Theatrical ===
Giant premiered at the 2025 BFI London Film Festival. The film was released in the United Kingdom on January 9, 2026. It was released in the United States by Vertical on May 22, 2026.

== Reception ==
=== Critical response ===
On the review aggregator Rotten Tomatoes, the film holds an approval rating of 57% based on reviews from 23 critics. Metacritic, which uses a weighted average, assigned the film a score of 50 out of 100, based on six critics, indicating "mixed or average".

=== Subject's response ===
Hamed stated that the film was fictional and did not accurately represent true events, in particular the breakdown of his relationship with Brendan Ingle. He also stated that the movie was portrayed more so from Ingle's perspective and not just his own. According to Hamed, he had no involvement or input during the production, only viewing it after completion. He said "although the film was 'difficult to watch', how can I not back it? It just put a smile on my face. It didn't go full out to how I would have wanted because there was none of my input, but thank God, it's nice when they do a movie you about you though, innit?" Hamed planned to release his own documentary series to present his side of the story, with Mark Wahlberg interested in being involved.
