= Guy Ritchie's The Covenant =

2023 film by Guy Ritchie

- Theatrical release poster
- Directed by: Guy Ritchie
- Written by: Guy Ritchie; Ivan Atkinson; Marn Davies
- Produced by: Guy Ritchie; Ivan Atkinson; John Friedberg; Josh Berger
- Starring: Jake Gyllenhaal; Dar Salim; Jason Wong; Antony Starr; Alexander Ludwig; Sean Sagar; Bobby Schofield; Emily Beecham; Jonny Lee Miller
- Cinematography: Ed Wild
- Edited by: James Herbert
- Music by: Christopher Benstead
- Production companies: STXfilms; Toff Guy Films
- Distributed by: Metro-Goldwyn-Mayer Pictures (United States); STX International (International)
- Release date: April 21, 2023
- Running time: 123 minutes
- Country: United States
- Language: English
- Budget: $55 million
- Box office: $21.9 million

Guy Ritchie's The Covenant (or simply The Covenant) is a 2023 American action drama film produced and directed by Guy Ritchie and co-written with Marn Davies and Ivan Atkinson. The film stars Jake Gyllenhaal and Dar Salim. Its plot follows John Kinley, a U.S. Army Green Beret Master Sergeant sent home after surviving a Taliban ambush and a harrowing trek to safety, and his subsequent journey to rescue Ahmed, his Afghan interpreter, to whom John feels indebted for saving his life.

The film was theatrically released by Metro-Goldwyn-Mayer and STXfilms in the United States on April 21, 2023, received generally positive reviews from critics and grossed $21 million.

== Plot ==
In March 2018, amidst the war in Afghanistan, U.S. Army Special Forces Master Sergeant John Kinley and his unit, based at Bagram Airfield and tasked with finding Taliban weapons, lose their interpreter in an explosion. In need of a replacement, Kinley is introduced to Ahmed Abdullah, a skilled interpreter who is disliked by other units because he thinks for himself and is difficult to work with. Kinley learns that Ahmed used to be in the opium trade and worked with the Taliban, but changed sides after they killed his son. It is later revealed that he expects to receive U.S. special immigration visas for his wife and as-yet-unborn child.

En route to a suspected IED production site, Ahmed deduces that an accompanying Afghan National Army soldier has betrayed them and saves the unit from a Taliban ambush, earning Kinley's respect. At a second suspected IED site more than 100 miles from Bagram, Kinley's unit is overwhelmed by superior Taliban forces, who kill everyone except him and Ahmed. While attempting to navigate through the mountainous Afghan terrain on foot, they are once again ambushed by Taliban fighters; Kinley is seriously wounded, but Ahmed manages to kill the attackers and then improvises a sled to transport Kinley. Ahmed evades the Taliban patrols who are hunting them, later buying a cart and some opium for pain relief from sympathetic civilians and pushing Kinley relentlessly over the country's treacherous mountain topography. Several days later, Ahmed and Kinley are again detected by Taliban fighters as they approach Bagram; Ahmed kills the Taliban before U.S. troops arrive. They treat him as a suspect, but he tells them he has Kinley with him.

Seven weeks later, Kinley, having been repatriated to his home in Santa Clarita, California, has no memory of how he escaped, but understands it was Ahmed who saved his life. Upon learning that Ahmed and his family were forced to move underground because Ahmed's feat had made him a local folk hero and the Taliban had placed a price on his head, Kinley tries in vain for over a month to procure U.S. visas for them. Emotionally tormented and rendered nearly sleepless by his inability to repay his debt to Ahmed, Kinley finally resolves to save Ahmed himself, first enlisting the assistance of his former superior, Lieutenant Colonel Vokes, to procure the visas, which Vokes eventually does.

Returning to Afghanistan under an alias so the Taliban will not be alerted to his presence, Kinley meets with Parker, a private military contractor he has hired after refinancing his house. Parker says they cannot leave right away, but when Kinley insists, he promises to provide support on the condition that Kinley locates Ahmed first. Kinley meets Ahmed's brother Ali, a Taliban supplier whose driver smuggles him across their territory in the back of a truck to Ahmed's location; at a checkpoint, Kinley is forced to kill two guards, which alerts the Taliban. When Kinley finds Ahmed, Parker tells him to take Ahmed and his family to their extraction point, the nearby Darunta Dam. Parker then deduces Kinley's and Ahmed's true identities and, realizing the danger they are in, arranges for an AC-130 gunship and an Apache attack helicopter to provide air support.

Ali's driver takes Kinley to the dam with Ahmed, his wife and their baby. At the dam, he, Ahmed and the driver engage a large Taliban force in a protracted gunfight, which ends when they run out of ammunition, but the gunship and helicopter arrive in the nick of time and wipe out the attackers. Parker arrives and tells Kinley he would have done the job for free had he known upfront who Kinley and Ahmed were. Flown back to Bagram in a helicopter, the group boards a military transport aircraft leaving Afghanistan for the U.S.

== Cast ==
- Jake Gyllenhaal as Master Sgt. John Kinley
- Dar Salim as Ahmed Abdullah
- Sean Sagar as Charlie "Jizzy" Crow
- Jason Wong as Joshua "JJ" Jung
- Rhys Yates as Tom "Tom Cat" Hancock
- Christian Ochoa as Eduardo "Chow Chow" Lopez
- Bobby Schofield as Steve Kersher
- Emily Beecham as Caroline Kinley
- Jonny Lee Miller as Lt. Col. Vokes
- Alexander Ludwig as Staff Sgt. Declan O'Brady
- Reza Diako as Haadee
- James Nelson-Joyce as Jack "Jack Jack" Jackson
- Antony Starr as Eddie Parker
- Fariba Sheikhan as Basira

== Production ==
It was announced in October 2021 that Jake Gyllenhaal was cast to star in an untitled film, to be directed by Guy Ritchie, and co-written with Ivan Atkinson and Marn Davies. In January 2022, Metro-Goldwyn-Mayer bought U.S. distribution rights to the film, which had been titled The Interpreter, planning to distribute it via their United Artists Releasing joint venture, while STXfilms co-financed the film and handled international sales; Amazon Prime Video acquired some international distribution rights, as well as post-theatrical streaming rights in the United States.

Filming began in February 2022 in Alicante, Spain, with Dar Salim, Alexander Ludwig, Antony Starr, Jason Wong, Bobby Schofield, Sean Sagar, Christian Ochoa and Emily Beecham added to the cast. Other filming locations in Spain later included Petrer, Alicante, Sax, Alicante, Alt Vinalopó / Alto Vinalopó, Villajoyosa and Zaragoza.

In December 2022, Ritchie revealed that the title had been changed from The Interpreter to The Covenant. The film was later officially titled Guy Ritchie's The Covenant, reportedly to distinguish it from the unrelated 2006 film.

== Release ==
The Covenant was released by Metro-Goldwyn-Mayer in the United States on April 21, 2023, and internationally by Amazon Prime Video.

The film was released digitally on May 9, with a Blu-ray and DVD release following on June 20 by Warner Bros. Discovery Home Entertainment. On June 16, 2023, Amazon Prime Video began streaming the film in Canada.

== Reception ==
=== Box office ===
In the United States and Canada, The Covenant was released alongside Evil Dead Rise, Chevalier, and the wide expansion of Beau Is Afraid, and was projected to gross around $6 million from 2,611 theaters in its opening weekend. The film made $2.2 million on its first day, and went on to debut to $6.3 million, finishing third behind The Super Mario Bros. Movie and Evil Dead Rise. In its second weekend the film made $3.6 million (a drop of 43%), finishing in ninth.

=== Critical response ===
On the review aggregator website Rotten Tomatoes, 83% of 119 critics' reviews are positive, with an average rating of 6.8/10. The website's consensus reads: "A satisfying, well-acted war thriller with surprising dramatic depths, Guy Ritchie's The Covenant tells a solid story with impressive restraint." Metacritic, which uses a weighted average, assigned the film a score of 63 out of 100, based on 28 critics, indicating "generally favorable" reviews. Audiences surveyed by CinemaScore gave the film an average grade of "A" on an A+ to F scale, while those polled by PostTrak gave it a 92% positive score, with 77% saying they would recommend it.

Richard Roeper of the Chicago Sun-Times gave the film 3 and a half stars out of 4, commenting on the use of Ritchie's name in the title by stating: "one can’t help but wonder if he did so because “Guy Ritchie’s The Covenant” is such a departure from the norm, with the director leaving many of the tools in his trick bag untouched in favor of a relatively traditional and admirably staged war film that features some of the most impressively staged extended battle sequences in recent memory, with moments so intense you’ll have to remember to breathe." Roeper also praised the film as effectively generating empathy for the two protagonists. The Daily Beast was also positive, praising the film for its criticism of US foreign policy, describing it as "a sober military thriller that excoriates Joe Biden’s decision to pull out of Afghanistan in 2021 and, in the process, to strand the thousands of local interpreters who had risked their lives to aid the American cause." The publication also praised the film's dramatic tension, Ed Wild's cinematography, and the performances of Salim and Gyllenhaal.

Robert Daniels of RogerEbert.com gave the film 2 out of 4 stars, praising the first half of the film and the performances by Dar Salim and Jake Gyllenhaal, but ultimately concluding "If The Covenant were only an interrogation of the hollowness of American exceptionalism, as its first hour suggests, it’d be among the most honest portrayals of the country’s role in the region. But Ritchie eventually awakens from his stupor, pushing this combat-action flick to gonzo territory." Daniels ruminates on the closing scenes of the film, remarking that the use of an AC-130 gunship only serves to amplify the tonal mismatch between the first and second halves of the film: "As black site contractors use an AC-130 gunship (an angel of death) to help Kinley and Ahmed, should we be grateful for the overwhelming firepower on display or rightfully horrified?"

Gregory Nussen rates the film 1 and a half stars out of 4 in his Slant Magazine review, echoing other critiques about the film's odd endorsement of the Global War on Terror. "As for the war itself, Ritchie, Davies, and Atkinson never interrogate American exceptionalism, the effectiveness of brute force tactics, or the logic of a 20-year engagement in a country far removed from the events of 9/11. With the first title screen at the end of The Covenant announcing, eulogy-like, that the Taliban re-established rule as soon as American troops left the area, the filmmakers also implicitly suggest that leaving was a mistake, essentially endorsing the same never-ending warfare that their script initially and half-heartedly criticizes."
