= Consecration (film) =

2023 film by Christopher Smith

- Theatrical release poster
- Directed by: Christopher Smith
- Written by: Christopher Smith; Laurie Cook
- Produced by: Laurie Cook; Jason Newmark; Xavier Marchand; Casey Herbert; Stuart Ford
- Starring: Jena Malone; Danny Huston; Janet Suzman
- Cinematography: Rob Hart; Shaun Mone
- Edited by: Arthur Davis; Brian Berdan
- Music by: Nathan Halpern
- Production companies: AGC Studios; Moonriver Content; Newscope Films; Bigscope Films
- Distributed by: IFC Films (United States); Vertigo Releasing (United Kingdom)
- Release dates: February 10, 2023 (United States); June 16, 2025 (United Kingdom)
- Running time: 91 minutes
- Countries: United Kingdom; United States
- Language: English
- Box office: $2.4 million

Consecration is a 2023 supernatural horror-thriller film directed by Christopher Smith from a script he co-wrote with Laurie Cook, and starring Jena Malone, Danny Huston and Janet Suzman. Shot in Scotland on the Isle of Skye, the film was released in the United States on 10 February 2023 and in the United Kingdom on 16 June 2025.

== Synopsis ==
An English woman arrives at a convent on the Isle of Skye looking to find out the truth about her priest brother's death, but discovers that he was himself also a suspect in a murder investigation. The protagonist had powers as a child, with no recollection of her past. After learning of her brother's death she travels to Scotland to uncover the secrets the convent is keeping.

== Cast ==
- Jena Malone as Dr. Grace Fario
  - Daisy Allen as young Grace
- Danny Huston as Father Romero
- Janet Suzman as Mother Superior
- Thoren Ferguson as DCI Officer Harris
- Eilidh Fisher as Sister Meg
- Alexandra Lewis as Sister Beth
- Jolade Obasola as Sister Matilda
- Will Keen as Dr. John Holmes, Grace's friend
- Steffan Cennydd as Michael Fario, Grace's younger brother
  - Kit Rakusen as young Michael
- Ian Pirie as Vincent Fario, Grace's abusive adoptive father
- Shaun Scott as Father Carol

== Production ==
The project was first reported in Variety in July 2021 with a shooting schedule set for later that summer, and an aim to pitch the film to sellers at the 2021 Cannes Film Festival. In October 2021, Jena Malone, Danny Huston and Janet Suzman were cast.

The film was produced by AGC Studios, produced by Xavier Marchand of Moonriver Content, Jason Newmark of Newscope Films and Laurie Cook of Bigscope Films who was also co-writer. It was financed by AGC with additional financing by Sherborne Capital. Smith told Entertainment Weekly he was inspired to make the film by due to his inherent fascination with all denominations of religion apparent strange essence saying "I'm never more spooked out than if I walk into a church or a temple. I wanted to make a movie about religion but do it seriously."

Principal photography took place in October 2021 in London and Scotland.

== Release ==
IFC Films distributed the film theatrically in the United States with Shudder having the first streaming window. Consecration was released on February 10, 2023, in the United States; followed by a March 3, 2023 release on VOD and a May 19, 2023 release on Shudder. The film was screened at the Glasgow Film Festival on March 11, 2023, but was not released in the United Kingdom until 16 June 2025.

== Reception ==
On the review aggregator website Rotten Tomatoes, 42% of 65 critics' reviews are positive, with an average rating of 5.1/10. The website's consensus reads: "Despite being blessed with Jena Malone in the lead, Consecration serves up Catholic-themed horror that's far more hoary than hallowed." Metacritic gave the film a weighted average score of 41 out of 100, based on 14 critics, indicating "mixed or average" reviews.
