= Tony Berlant =

American artist (1941–2026)

- Born: Anthony Hanna Berlant; 1941; New York City, U.S.
- Died: October 27, 2026 (aged 85)
- Education: University of California, Los Angeles (BA, MA, MFA)
- Occupation: Artist
- Years active: 1970–2026
- Spouse: Helen Méndez (m. 1985)
- Children: Kate Berlant

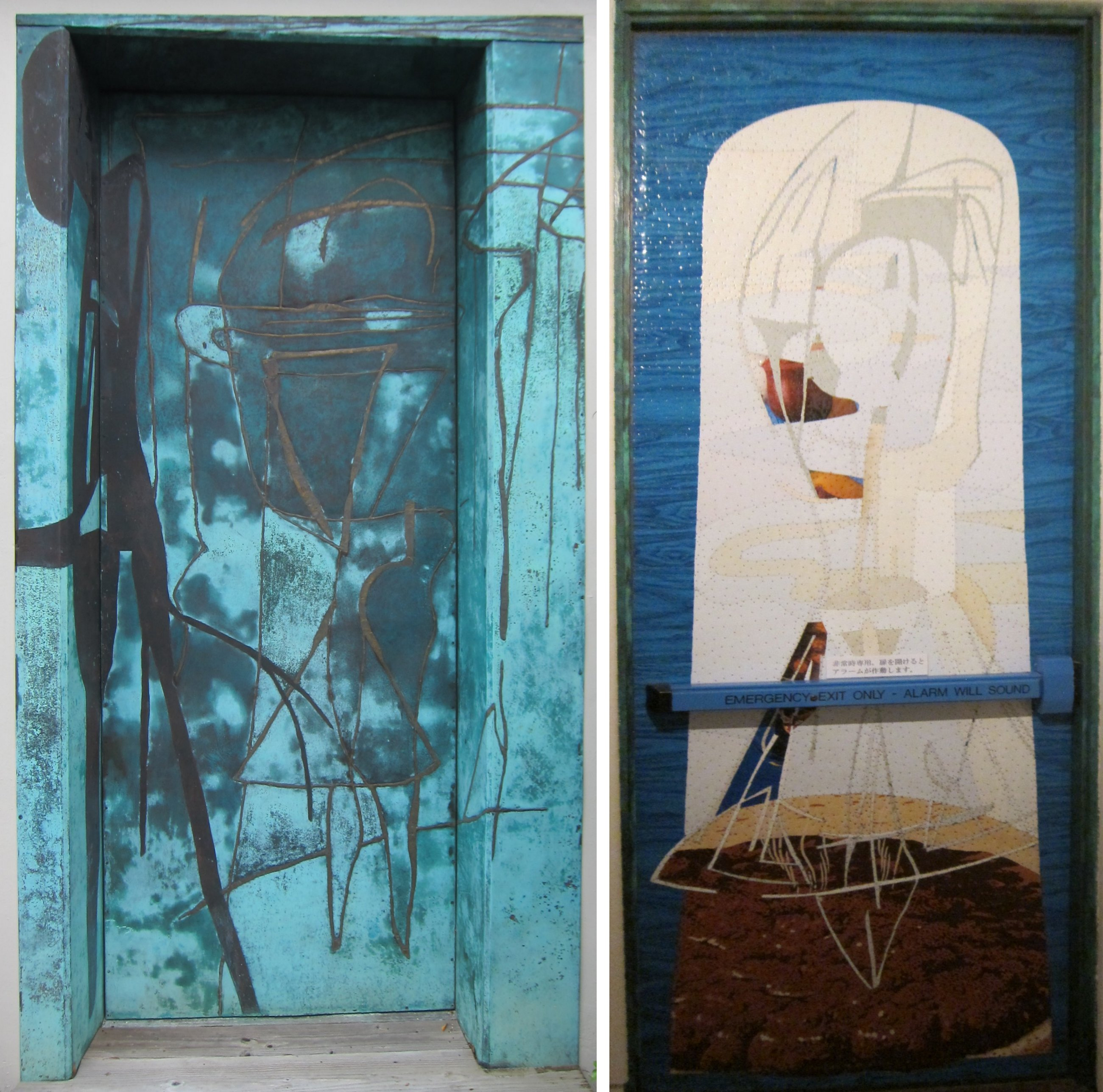
Baba's Door by Tony Berlant, Spalding House, Honolulu, collaged metal, 1988

Anthony Hanna Berlant (1941 – October 27, 2026) was an American collage artist/sculptor and art collector. Berlant owned a large collection of Southwestern Native American art, especially Mimbres pottery and Navajo rugs.

== Early life and education ==
Anthony Hanna Berlant was born to Jewish parents in New York City in 1941.

Berlant attended the University of California, Los Angeles, where he earned a BA (1961) and MA (1962) in painting, and an MFA (1963) in sculpture.

== Work ==
Berlant became known for his collage sculptures of found metal objects. More recently, he had utilized tin of his own manufacture, gaining control over the color.

== Mimbres pottery collection ==
Berlant was a founding member of the Mimbres Foundation, a Los Angeles-based archaeological conservancy working to protect vulnerable Mimbres sites. The Mimbres Foundation also assembled the first photographic archive of all known Mimbres figurative pottery. This archive is currently maintained by the University of New Mexico. Parts of the archive are available online.

Berlant worked with archaeologist Steven A. LeBlanc and others in attempts to attribute Mimbres painted pottery to specific (but still anonymous) Native artists. Berlant and LeBlanc found that (in their estimation) a relatively small number of Mimbres artists made the majority of the ancient pottery, perhaps as few as 2 or 3 artists per village at any given time. Berlant identified one prolific artist he called the "Rabbit Master," who painted rabbits in Figure-ground reversal. Examples are given in a later paper by Russell and Hegmon, which provides photos of other ancient Mimbreño artists' work.

== Personal life and death ==
Berlant met performer Helen Méndez at a party in Detroit in the 1970s. Ten years later, they met again in Los Angeles and he recognized her immediately. The two married in 1985. Their daughter is comedian Kate Berlant.

Berlant lived and worked in Santa Monica, California. He died from complications of Alzheimer's disease on October 27, 2026, at the age of 85.

== Collections which display Berlant's work ==
- Art Institute of Chicago
- Crocker Art Museum (Sacramento, California)
- Hirshhorn Museum and Sculpture Garden (Washington, D.C.)
- Honolulu Museum of Art
- Iris & B. Gerald Cantor Center for Visual Arts (Stanford, California)
- Long Beach Museum of Art (Long Beach, California
- Los Angeles County Museum of Art
- Minneapolis Institute of Art
- Museum of Contemporary Art, Los Angeles
- Museum of Contemporary Art San Diego
- Oakland Museum of California (Oakland, California)
- Orange County Museum of Art (Newport Beach, California)
- Palm Springs Art Museum (Palm Springs, California)
- Philadelphia Museum of Art
- Sheldon Museum of Art (Lincoln, Nebraska)
- Whitney Museum of American Art (New York City)
- Wichita Art Museum (Wichita, Kansas)

== Publications ==
- Brody, J. J. et al., Mimbres Pottery Ancient Art of the American Southwest with introduction by Tony Berlant, Hudson Hills Press, New York, 1983 ISBN 0933920466
- Clothier, Peter, Tony Berlant: Recent Work 1982-1987, Los Angeles Municipal Art Gallery, 1987 ISBN 0936429089
- Fourcade, Xavier, Tony Berlant New Work 1985-1986, publisher: Xavier Fourcade, 1986
- Fujinami, Josine & Niriko Fujinami, Individual Realities In The California Art Scene Exhibition, Sezon Museum of Art, Tokyo, May 11 - June 10, 1991 Text in English and Japanese Artists in the exhibit: Peter Alexander, Carlos Almarez, Tony Berlant, Laurie Brown, Suzanne Caporae Ianco-Starreles, Sezon Museum of Art, Tokyo, 1991
- Holstein, Jonathan & Robert MacDonald, Artist's Quilts: Quilts by ten contemporary artists in collaboration with Ludy Strauss. Peter Alexander / Charles Arnoldi / Tony Berlant / Ron Cooper / Guy Dill / Laddie John Dill / Claire Falkenstein / Charles Garabedian / Craig Kauffman / Ken Price, La Jolla Museum of Contemporary Art, 1981
- Honolulu Museum of Art, Spalding House: Self-guided Tour, Sculpture Garden, 2014, p. 2.
- L A Louver Gallery, Tony Berlant: Recent Work, L.A. Louver, Los Angeles, 1988
- L A Louver Gallery, Tony Berlant New Work 1990-93, L.A. Louver, 1993
- Paul, Stella & Cheryl A. Brutvan, Tony Berlant: Recent Work, Contemporary Arts Museum, Houston, Texas, 1982
- Plake, Tony, Katherine Plake & Hough Berlant, Navajo Blankets from the Collection of Tony Berlant, Palm Springs Desert Museum, 1991
- Plous, Phyllis, Sculptural Perspectives: An Exhibition of Small Sculptures of the 70s. Joel Shapiro - Judy Pfaff - Don Johnson - Tony Berlant - Thomas Bang, University of California, Santa Barbara, 1979
- Sachs, Sid, An Inside Place; Interior Spaces of the Mind and Eye by Tony Berlant, Robert Bingham, March Hermansader, Jane Irish, Jess, Irving Perlin, H. C. Westermann, Noyes Museum, Oceanville NJ, 1985
- Whitney Museum of American Art, Tony Berlant: The Marriage of New York and Athens, Whitney Museum of American Art, New York, 1974
