= Locked Down (film) =

2021 film by Doug Liman

- Original release poster
- Directed by: Doug Liman
- Written by: Steven Knight
- Produced by: P. J. van Sandwijk; Alison Winter; Michael Lesslie
- Starring: Anne Hathaway; Chiwetel Ejiofor; Stephen Merchant; Mindy Kaling; Lucy Boynton; Dulé Hill; Jazmyn Simon; Ben Stiller; Ben Kingsley
- Cinematography: Remi Adefarasin
- Edited by: Saar Klein
- Music by: John Powell
- Production companies: AGC Studios; Nebulastar; Hypnotic; Storyteller Productions
- Distributed by: Warner Bros. Pictures
- Release date: January 14, 2021 (United States)
- Running time: 118 minutes
- Countries: United States; United Kingdom
- Language: English
- Budget: $3 million
- Box office: $346,899

Locked Down is a 2021 romantic comedy heist film directed by Doug Liman and written by Steven Knight. The film stars Anne Hathaway and Chiwetel Ejiofor, with Stephen Merchant, Mindy Kaling, Lucy Boynton, Mark Gatiss, Claes Bang, Ben Stiller, and Ben Kingsley in supporting roles.

Locked Down follows a couple who plan to execute a jewelry heist. It was written, financed, and filmed entirely during the COVID-19 pandemic. The film was released in the United States on January 14, 2021, on HBO Max, and received mixed reviews from critics.

The film was removed from HBO Max in July 2022.

== Plot ==
Paxton and Linda, a disgruntled couple in London during the COVID-19 pandemic lockdown, face personal and professional challenges. Paxton's criminal past limits his job options, while Linda struggles with her role in laying off employees. They contemplate stealing a valuable diamond from Harrods but delay the decision until they have it in their possession. During their heist, they encounter a former colleague, Donald, who agrees to help them.

== Cast ==
- Anne Hathaway as Linda, Paxton's separated partner
- Chiwetel Ejiofor as Paxton, Linda's separated partner
- Stephen Merchant as Michael Morgan, Head of Security at Harrods
- Mindy Kaling as Kate, Linda's former co-worker at Harrods
- Lucy Boynton as Charlotte
- Mark Gatiss as Donald, Linda's co-worker
- Claes Bang as Essien, the owner of Linda's company
- Dulé Hill as David, Paxton's half-brother
- Jazmyn Simon as Maria, David's wife
- Sam Spruell as Martin, Paxton's co-worker
- Frances Ruffelle as Paxton and Linda's neighbor
- Ben Stiller as Guy, Linda's boss
- Ben Kingsley as Malcolm, Paxton's boss
- Katie Leung as Natasha
- Bobby Schofield as Noah

== Production ==
The film was announced in September 2020 as Lockdown, with Doug Liman directing a screenplay that Steven Knight had written that July over a dare. Anne Hathaway was announced to star, with filming set to start later that month in London. Chiwetel Ejiofor, Ben Stiller, Lily James, Stephen Merchant, Dulé Hill, Jazmyn Simon, and Mark Gatiss were also announced as cast members. In October 2020, Mindy Kaling, Ben Kingsley, and Lucy Boynton were added to the cast of the film, with Boynton replacing James. Claes Bang, Sam Spruell and Frances Ruffelle were revealed as members of the cast in January 2021.

The film was shot over the course of 18 days. Due to the limited resources and short production window the order of several scenes needed to be adjusted, forcing Hathaway and Ejiofor to tape their un-memorized lines around set. Despite initial reports it had a budget of $10 million, Liman insisted the actual cost of the film "started with a three." The UK-based company Koala FX was responsible for the advance clean up.

John Powell scored the film making it the first time he worked with Doug Liman since Fair Game in 2010.

== Release ==
The film was acquired by Warner Bros. Pictures in December 2020, with the intention to release it on HBO Max for an early 2021 release. It was released on January 14, 2021.

== Reception ==
On review aggregator website Rotten Tomatoes, Locked Down holds an approval rating of 42% based on 115 reviews, with an average of 5.00/10. The website's critics consensus states, "Locked Down combines a heist caper, a relationship drama, and pandemic-era timeliness to produce a film that's frustratingly less than the sum of its parts." According to Metacritic, which sampled 33 mainstream critics and calculated a weighted average score of 42 out of 100, the film received "mixed or average" reviews.

David Ehrlich of IndieWire gave the film a B and wrote: "Yes, Locked Down is a heist movie, though one that's more concerned with 'stealing back the things that you feel life owes you than it is with priceless jewels... COVID-19 serves as a fitting backdrop for an amiable romp about the freedoms we take for granted, and the confines that dictated our lives long before we were forced to spend them at home." Nick Allen of RogerEbert.com gave the film 2 out of 4 stars, writing that "in spite of the available chemistry and charisma from Hathaway and Ejiofor, Locked Down proves to be a bewildering mess." Erik Nielsen of Little White Lies criticised the film and wrote: "a tone-deaf pandemic crime caper" and "affluent couple plot an audacious diamond heist in the Covid movie absolutely no one needed" scoring the film with a 1/5 rating.
