= Bobby Schofield =

British Actor

- Born: Robert Andrew Schofield; 2 April 1993 (age 33); Kirkby, Merseyside, England
- Occupation: Actor
- Years active: 2002–present
- Father: Andrew Schofield

Robert Andrew Schofield (born 2 April 1993) is an English actor. His films include Black Sea (2014) and Guy Ritchie's The Covenant (2023). On television, he is known for his roles in the History Channel series Knightfall (2017–2018) and the BBC One series SAS: Rogue Heroes (2022–present) and This City Is Ours (2025–present).

== Early life and education ==
Schofield was born in Kirkby, near Liverpool, the son of actor Andrew Schofield. Schofield attended Overdale Primary School and Ruffwood School, from where he was expelled. He is dyslexic. He completed his secondary education at All Saints Catholic High School. He studied performing arts and history at the City of Liverpool College, completing a Higher National Certificate.

== Career ==
He gained his first experiences as an actor on various stages. He took part in plays by the Everyman Youth Theatre. Even as a child he appeared in a short film and as an episode actor in a television series.

Schofield had his first notable feature film role as Tobin in the 2014 submarine thriller Black Sea. He also appeared in episodes of the BBC One medical soap opera Doctors and the BBC Three miniseries Our World War. From 2017 to 2018, he had his first main role as Parsifal in the first two seasons of the History Channel series Knightfall. He played Bill Dalton in the 2018 film The Catcher Was a Spy and Princey in the 2019 film How to Build a Girl.

In 2021, Schofield appeared in the films Locked Down as Noah, Cherry as Clover and Don't Breathe 2 as Jared and the BBC One anthology Time as Baz. In 2022, he began starring as Dave Kershaw in SAS: Rogue Heroes, also on BBC One; he returned for series two in 2025. He also featured in the ITV miniseries Anne as Michael Williams, The Walk-In as Matt Hankinson, and The Suspect as Bobby Moran.

Schofield starred as Steve Kersher in Guy Ritchie's The Covenant in 2023, and appeared in the Netflix series Eric as Kennedy. As of 2025, Schofield plays Bonehead in This City Is Ours on BBC One.

He had a central role in the 2025 British television drama Unforgivable from Jimmy McGovern, alongside Anna Friel and Anna Maxwell Martin. McGovern, who had worked with Schofield on two previous projects, had written the character of Joe Mitchell specifically for him; "We did write [the role in Unforgivable] for Bobby Schofield, which is dangerous to do because often they'll say 'no' and you've written with them in mind." He won in the Leading Actor category at the 2026 Royal Television Society Programme Awards.

In December 2025, it was revealed that he had been cast as Neil Aspinall, "road manager and trusted confidant" of The Beatles in Sam Mendes's The Beatles – A Four-Film Cinematic Event.

== Filmography ==
=== Film ===
Year	Title	Role	Theatre
2002	The Complaint	Ice cream kid	Short film
2010	Reds & Blues: The Ballad of Dixie & Kenny	Jester	
2014	A Complicated Way to Live	Sergeant Glasses	Short film
2014	Black Sea	Tobin	
2016	Holes in Their Souls	Peter	Short film
2016	Spilt Milk	Freddy	Short film
2016	Motherland	Daniel	Short film
2018	The Catcher Was a Spy	Bill Dalton	
2019	The Devils harmony	Doug	Short film
2019	How to Build a Girl	Pricey	
2021	Locked Down	Noah	
2021	Cherry	Clover	
2021	Don't Breathe 2	Jared	
2023	Guy Ritchie's The Covenant	Steve Kersher	
2024	The Death of the House Party	Cosmic Bob	Short film
2025	The Search for John Hulley	John Hulley	Short film
2026	Heysel 85	Alan West	
2028	The Beatles – A Four-Film Cinematic Event	Neil Aspinall	Filming

=== Television ===
Year	Title	Role	Theatre
2004	Grange Hill	Carl	1 episode
2014	Doctors	Ed Walker	8 episodes
2014	Our World War	Tom Andrews	1 episode
2016	The Watchman	Fleece Cap	Television film
2016	Harley and the Davidsons	Young Veteran	1 episode
2017–2018	Knightfall	Parsifal	10 episodes
2019	Comedy Blaps	Mitchell	1 episode
2020	Inside No. 9	Patrick	Anthology
2020	Anthony	Mick Woodfield	Television film
2021	Time	Barry Schofield	2 episodes
2022	Anne	Michael Williams	Miniseries, 4 episodes
2022	The Suspect	Bobby Moran	5 episodes
2022	The Walk-In	Matt Hankinson	4 episodes
2022–present	SAS: Rogue Heroes	Dave Kershaw	13 episodes
2024	Eric	Kennedy	2 episodes
2025–2026	This City Is Ours	Peter "Bonehead" Murphy	9 episodes
2025	Unforgivable	Joe Mitchell	TV film
2026	Dear England	Wayne Rooney	1 episode
