= Kate Berlant =

American comedian, actress, and writer (born 1987)

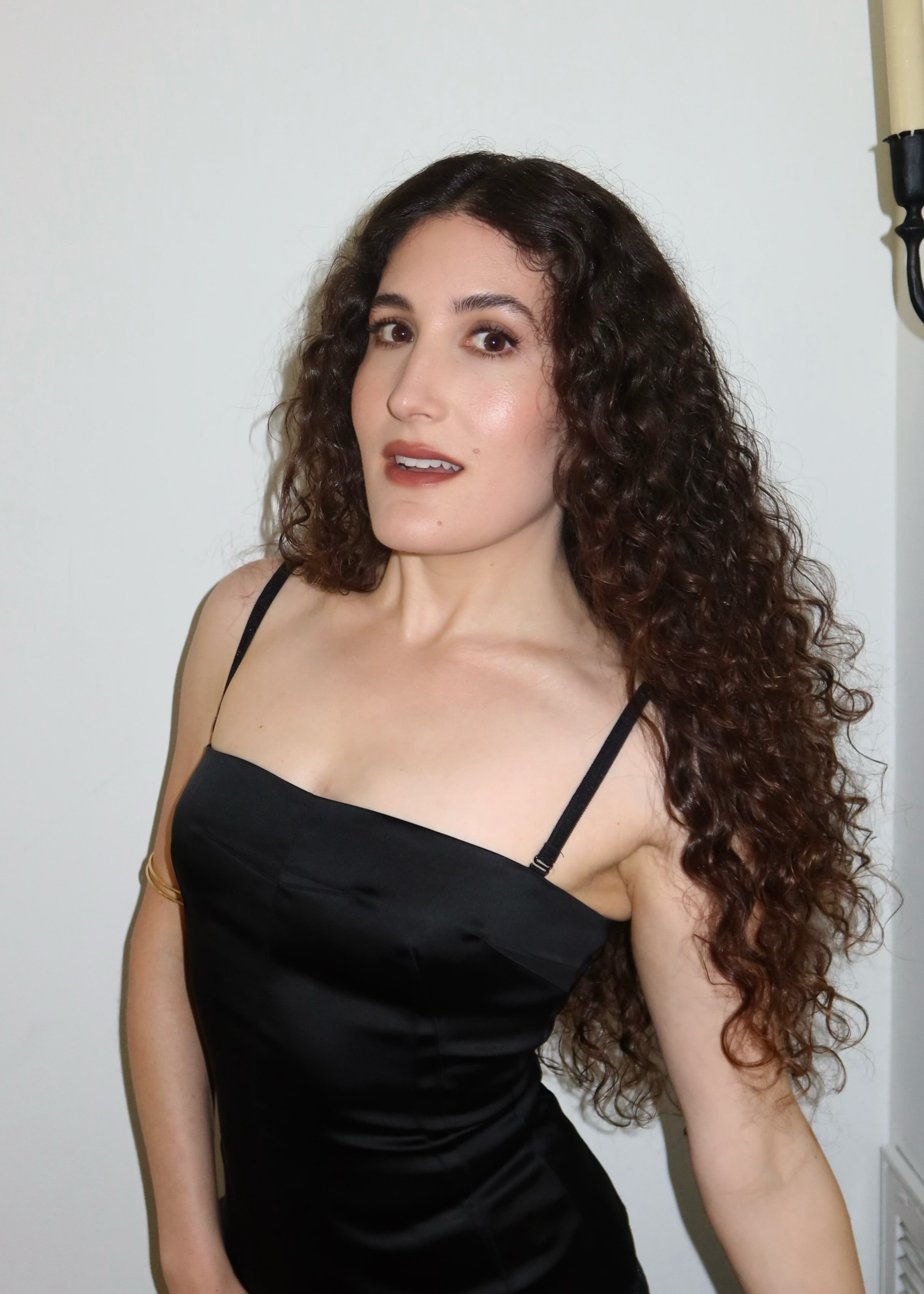
- Berlant in 2026
- Born: Kate Elizabeth Méndez Berlant; July 16, 1987 (age 39); Los Angeles, California, U.S.
- Education: New York University (BA, MA)
- Occupations: Comedian; actress; writer
- Years active: 2012–present
- Relatives: Tony Berlant (father); Helen Méndez Berlant (mother)
- Website: kateberlant.com

Kate Elizabeth Méndez Berlant (born July 16, 1987) is an American comedian, actress, and writer. Known for her surrealist and absurdist style, she is best known for her three comedy specials, including Would It Kill You to Laugh? (2022) with John Early, as well as her podcast, Poog, with fellow comedian Jacqueline Novak.

== Early life and education ==
Kate Elizabeth Méndez Berlant was born in Los Angeles on July 16, 1987, the daughter and only child of performer Helen (née Méndez) and artist Tony Berlant. She is of Spanish descent on her mother's side and Jewish descent on her father's. She attended The Archer School for Girls in West Los Angeles. She received a Bachelor of Arts and Master of Arts in performance studies from New York University.

== Career ==
=== 2012–2020: Early work ===
Berlant made her television debut in a 2002 episode of Lizzie McGuire. In 2016, she performed stand-up on The Tonight Show and The Meltdown with Jonah and Kumail, and starred in two episodes of the Netflix sketch comedy series The Characters. She has performed regularly at the Eugene Mirman Comedy Festival. In 2017, she and John Early created the Vimeo original series 555, which was produced by Abso Lutely Productions.

She performed at (and collaborated with) arts institutions including MoMA PS1, White Columns, the Getty Center, and the Los Angeles Museum of Contemporary Art. She won the American version of Taskmaster in 2018. She appeared in Sorry to Bother You (2018) that same year, and followed that up with Once Upon a Time in Hollywood (2019) the following year. In October 2020, Berlant was cast in Don't Worry Darling (2022) as Peg.

=== 2020–2022: Poog podcast and Would It Kill You to Laugh? ===
Berlant at the Tomorrow Never Knows festival in 2019

In November 2020, Berlant and fellow comedian Jacqueline Novak launched Poog, a comedic wellness podcast under iHeartRadio's Big Money Players network. The show satirized the wellness industry as the duo explored "various products and practices, consulting experts and questioning their own pursuits of health and happiness". Poog amassed a cult following and aired more than 200 episodes before concluding on October 15, 2024, with a final episode titled Goodbye Poog, marking the end of their contract with iHeartRadio.

In June 2022, Berlant and Early released the one-hour sketch comedy special Would It Kill You to Laugh? on Peacock. It was directed by Andrew DeYoung and co-starred Berlant and Early, who play fictionalized versions of themselves in the future who had previously been on the sitcom He's Gay, She's Half-Jewish and are reunited by Meredith Vieira after a bitter falling out. They use the framing device of the reunion to display short skits with absurdist characters that they liked and built upon over a decade of creating and filming short comedy videos, and structured the special around shorter, digestable segments that would be consistent with the popularity of short-form video, but aimed to use comedy that would be timeless. Some of the sketches had been planned for years, but were not filmed until Berlant and Early secured the budget for them. Would It Kill You to Laugh? was backed by both Peacock and A24.

Paste positively compared Would It Kill You to Laugh? to Bo Burnham's special Inside for the way that both use identity in comedy to cause audience reflection, and praised its "no-holds-barred surrealism". Vulture praised the work as a "thoughtful and striking about partnerships and, in particular, about male–female relationships" and considered it "darker and more alarming" than Berlant and Early's previous collaborations. Decider recommended that audiences view it for the pair's ability to mine the "rich comedic tradition for overconfident characters who find themselves in way over their heads but cannot seem to get themselves out of the situation without making things worse". The special was nominated for Best Comedy Special at the 28th Critics' Choice Awards and for Outstanding Writing for a Variety Special at the Primetime Emmy Awards.

=== 2022–2024: Cinnamon in the Wind and KATE ===
Cinnamon in the Wind, Berlant's largely improvised debut stand-up special, was recorded in March 2019 at the Upright Citizens Brigade for FX. It was directed by Burnham, who first suggested that Berlant film a special after going to see one of her performances. For reasons that were never explained, the special remained unreleased for over three years until debuting on Hulu in September 2022. A Decider review praised Cinnamon in the Wind and pointed out the meta-textual element of the comedy. The New Yorker similarly praised Berlant's comedy for "breaking down the typical relationship between performer, ego, and audience".

Berlant's next one-woman show, KATE, was also directed by Burnham and ran at the Pasadena Playhouse until February 11, 2024.

=== 2024–2026: Parmesan and Berlant & Novak podcast ===
Berlant with the cast of She Keeps Me Young at the 2026 Tribeca Festival

On October 22, 2024, Berlant and Novak debuted a new independently produced and self-titled podcast, Berlant & Novak. This venture continues their comedic exploration of wellness themes, offering subscribers access to video episodes and bonus content. In April 2026, Berlant and Novak acquired the distribution rights to Poog and relaunched the podcast under its original title. The podcast remains independently produced.

In September 2026, HBO announced Berlant's second solo comedy special, Kate Berlant: Parmesan, which premiered on HBO on October 16, 2026. The hour combines personal stories and stream-of-consciousness reflections on the moon, technology, sexuality, modern life, and the conventions of stand-up comedy. It was filmed over three performances across two nights at the historic Plaza Nightclub in Los Angeles. Berlant had been developing the material since 2023, largely through her recurring monthly performances at Largo at the Coronet in Los Angeles, with creative influence from her partner, musician Naomi McPherson.

Parmesan was directed by Berlant's longtime friend and collaborator Doron Max Hagay, with cinematography by Sam Levy. Levy previously worked with Berlant on Kate and served as cinematographer on Jacqueline Novak's comedy special Get on Your Knees. The special was written and performed by Berlant and executive produced by Berlant, McPherson, Dave Kneebone, and Janel Kranking.

== Personal life ==
Berlant lived in New York City for much of her twenties before returning to her native Los Angeles, a city for which she has frequently expressed a strong affection. She has spoken regularly about her interest in cooking and film, as well as her enthusiasm for Los Angeles restaurants and the city's food culture. As of April 2024, Berlant lives in the Echo Park neighborhood of Los Angeles.

Berlant is close with screenwriter Samy Burch, whom she met while attending the Archer School for Girls. She has described Burch as her first deeply creative friendship. Berlant counts several frequent collaborators among her close friends, including John Early and Jacqueline Novak. She is in a relationship with music producer and guitarist in the band MUNA, Naomi McPherson. She joined the Democratic Socialists of America in December 2019.

== Filmography ==
=== Film ===
| Year | Title | Role | Notes |
|---|---|---|---|
| 2012 | Lampshade Susan | Lampshade Susan | Short film |
| 2012 | The Rock Collection | Rock Collector | Short film |
| 2012 | Family Dinner | Mom | Short film |
| 2012 | Paris | Self | Short film |
| 2013 | Reunion | | Short film |
| 2013 | SEX | Petra | Short film |
| 2014 | The Greggs | Shelley | Short film |
| 2014 | Santa Monica | | Short film |
| 2015 | Shopping | | Short film |
| 2016 | I Love You Both | Ivy | |
| 2016 | Dean | Naomi | |
| 2016 | Buster's Mal Heart | Phone Sex Operator (voice) | |
| 2017 | The Pianist | Chloe | Short film |
| 2018 | Sorry to Bother You | Diana DeBauchery | |
| 2018 | Little Bitches | Counselor | |
| 2018 | Happy Anniversary | Lindsay | |
| 2018 | Duck Butter | Kathy | |
| 2019 | How Have You Been? | Self | Short film |
| 2019 | Once Upon a Time in Hollywood | Bruin Box Office Girl | |
| 2019 | After Class | Jackie Cohn | |
| 2019 | Rachel | Rachel | Short film |
| 2019 | Frankenstein's Monster's Monster, Frankenstein | Monica Fulton | |
| 2022 | Don't Worry Darling | Peg | |
| 2023 | First Time Female Director | Clara Ann | |
| 2023 | Dream Scenario | Mary | |
| 2025 | Maddie's Secret | Deena Michaels | |
| 2026 | The Moment | Molly | |
| 2026 | Wishful Thinking | Tilly | |
| 2026 | I Love Boosters | Mall Manager on P.A. (voice) | |
| 2026 | The Saviors | Cleo | |
| 2026 | Plantman & Blondie: A Dress Up Gang Film | TBA | |
| 2026 | The Breadwinner | Angela Ashford | |
| 2026 | She Keeps Me Young | Ghosting Lecturer | |
| 2026 | Babies | Eliza | |
| 2027 | Naughty † | | Filming |

=== Television ===
| Year | Title | Role | Notes |
|---|---|---|---|
| 2002 | Lizzie McGuire | Student #2 | Episode: "Best Dressed for Much Less" |
| 2014 | Don't Walk | Smug Local | Episode: "Which Hood?" |
| 2014 | Crazy House | | Television film |
| 2015 | Monica | Denise | Episode: "Episode 2" |
| 2016–2018 | Animals. | Sapphire / Various | Voice role, 4 episodes |
| 2016–2019 | Those Who Can't | Kate McGill / Zandra | 2 episodes |
| 2016 | Netflix Presents: The Characters | Various | 2 episodes |
| 2016–2020 | BoJack Horseman | Various | Voice role, 3 episodes |
| 2016–2017 | Clarence | Ms. Julip | Voice role, 4 episodes |
| 2016 | Transparent | Ronit | Episode: "Oh Holy Night" |
| 2016 | Comedy Bang! Bang! | Karen | Episode: "Kaley Cuoco Wears a Black Blazer and Slip on Sneakers" |
| 2016–2021 | Search Party | Nia / Editor | 6 episodes |
| 2017 | 555 | Various | 5 episodes |
| 2017 | Bajillion Dollar Propertie$ | Morningstar | Episode: "Dean's Legacy" |
| 2017 | Danger & Eggs | Rhonda the Relator | Voice role, episode: "Tube of Pain / Broccoli" |
| 2017 | Comrade Detective | Reporter | Voice role, episode: "The Whole World is Watching" |
| 2017 | Tim and Eric Awesome 10 Year Anniversary Version, Great Job? | Linda | Television film |
| 2017–2018 | Ghosted | Linda | 7 episodes |
| 2017 | Easy | Lauren | Episode: "Conjugality" |
| 2018 | Another Period | Reporter | Episode: "Sex Nickelodeon" |
| 2018 | Alone Together | Jess | Episode: "Sleepover" |
| 2018 | Taskmaster US | Self | 8 episodes |
| 2018 | High Maintenance | Reina | Episode: "#goalz" |
| 2018 | Nailed It! | Self | Episode: "Just Do It Yourself!" |
| 2019–2023 | The Other Two | Pitzi Pyle | 2 episodes |
| 2019 | I Think You Should Leave with Tim Robinson | Owner of Jim Davis' House | Episode: "We Used to Watch This at My Old Work" |
| 2019 | Life in Pieces | Eliza | Episode: "Birth Meddling Jacket Denial" |
| 2019 | Tuca & Bertie | Woman Taking Up Space | Voice role, 3 episodes |
| 2019 | The Good Place | Esmerelda | Episode: "The Answer" |
| 2020 | Our Cartoon President | Lara Trump | Voice role, episode: "Warren vs. Facebook" |
| 2020 | Indebted | Maggie | Episode: "Everybody's Talking About the Shiva" |
| 2020 | The Shivering Truth | Lily Liblin | Voice role, episode: "Nesslessness" |
| 2021 | Close Enough | River Lake | Voice role, episode: "Time Hooch/World's Greatest Teacher" |
| 2021 | Loki | Ren Faire Woman | Episode: "The Variant" |
| 2021 | American Dad! | HG Member | Voice role, episode: "Hot Scoomp" |
| 2021 | Bob's Burgers | Shampooer | Voice role, episode: "Seven-tween Again" |
| 2021–2023 | Summer Camp Island | Striped Horse | Voice role, 3 episodes |
| 2021 | The Fungies! | Margot Mafungo / Mom | Voice role, episode: "Pascal's BIG Fan" |
| 2022 | Space Force | Sal Jr. | Voice role, episode: "The Hack" |
| 2022 | Life & Beth | Kate | Episode: "Life & Beth" |
| 2022 | A League of Their Own | Shirley Cohen | 8 episodes |
| 2022 | Archer | Unknown character | Voice role, episode: "Distraction Action" |
| 2022 | Central Park | Unknown character | Voice role, 2 episodes |
| 2022 | Would It Kill You to Laugh? | Various | Sketch comedy special |
| 2022 | Cinnamon in the Wind | Herself | Stand-up comedy special |
| 2024 | Family Guy | Customer | Voice role, episode: "Lifeguard Meg" |
| 2024 | Fantasmas | Madame Victory | Episode: "Looking4Twinks2S**k" |
| 2024 | Doctor Odyssey | Agnes Simkin | Episode: "Wellness Week" |
| 2024 | The Simpsons | Stressed Woman | Voice role, episode: "Convenience Airways" |
| 2024 | Laid | Janelle | Episode: "Toby and Lindsey Are Here" |
| 2025 | Very Important People | Barbara | Episode: "Barbara and Bill" |
| 2025 | The Bear | Georgie | Episode: "Replicants" |
| 2025 | Long Story Short | Karen Getelman | Voice role, episode: "Honoring Naomi Schwartz" |
| 2025 | Solar Opposites | Paula | Voice role, episode: "The Goocleus and the Protoshlorpian" |
| 2025 | All's Fair | Devin Samartino | Episode: "Pilot" |
| 2025 | Nobody Wants This | Rabbi Cami | 2 episodes |
| 2026 | Strip Law | | Voice role, episode: "Trophy Son (Or 'The Mother Wound')" |
| 2026 | Parmesan | Herself | Stand-up comedy special |
| 2026 | The Terrors of Jordan Mendoza | Riley | Episode: "This Idiot Is Freaking Out" |
