= Lady Boss: The Jackie Collins Story =

2021 film directed by Laura Fairrie

- Official poster
- Directed by: Laura Fairrie
- Produced by: John Battsek; Lizzie Gillett
- Cinematography: Lynda Hall
- Edited by: Joe Carey
- Music by: Mat Davidson
- Production companies: CNN Films; BBC Arts; AGC Studios; Passion Pictures
- Distributed by: Modern Films; CNN
- Release dates: June 10, 2021 (Tribeca); June 27, 2021 (United States); July 2, 2021 (United Kingdom)
- Running time: 96 minutes
- Countries: United States; United Kingdom
- Language: English
- Box office: $15,751

Lady Boss: The Jackie Collins Story is a 2021 documentary film, directed by Laura Fairrie. It follows the life and career of Jackie Collins.

It had its world premiere at the Tribeca Film Festival on June 10, 2021. It was released in the United States on June 27, 2021, by CNN, and in the United Kingdom on July 2, 2021, by Modern Films.

== Synopsis ==
It follows the life and career of Jackie Collins.

== Production ==
In August 2019, it was announced Laura Fairrie would direct a documentary film revolving around the life of Jackie Collins, with CNN Films and BBC Arts producing, with CNN set to distribute in the United States.

== Release ==
It had its world premiere at the Tribeca Film Festival on June 10, 2021. Prior to, Modern Films acquired U.K. distribution rights to the film, and set it for a July 2, 2021, release. It was released in the United States on June 27, 2021.

== Reception ==
Lady Boss: The Jackie Collins Story received positive reviews from film critics. It holds a 100% approval rating on review aggregator website Rotten Tomatoes, based on 16 reviews, with a weighted average of 7.40/10. The site's critical consensus reads, "Helmed with the same frothy glamor as its subject's novels, Lady Boss is a joyous retrospective of Jackie Collins and a persuasive reappraisal of her literary contributions." On Metacritic, the film holds a rating of 70 out of 100, based on 6 critics, indicating "generally favorable" reviews.
