= All Saints Catholic High School, Kirkby =

All Saints Catholic High School

Location
- Roughwood Drive; Kirkby, Merseyside, L33 8XF; England; 53.4770°N 2.8861°W

Information
- Type: Voluntary aided school
- Religious affiliation: Roman Catholic
- Established: 11 January 2010
- Local authority: Knowsley
- Department for Education URN: 135479 Tables
- Ofsted: Reports
- Head teacher: Anthony McGuiness
- Gender: Coeducational
- Age: 11 to 18
- Enrolment: 929
- Website: http://allsaintschs.org.uk/

All Saints Catholic High School is a Knowsley based Roman Catholic secondary school educating pupils aged 11–18 years of age in the Kirkby area of Merseyside, England. The school also operates a sixth form.

== History ==
All Saints CCfL opened on 11 January 2010, following the closure of the Bewley Drive site in December 2009. The Bewley Drive site closed because of Knowsley's Building schools for the future scheme. All Saints followed the other 10 Knowsley schools in creating 7 new "centres for learning".

=== Former schools ===
St Gregory's School on Bewley Drive in Southdene, Kirkby merged with St Kevin's School Northwood to form All Saints Catholic High School. St Gregory's School was the first girls' catholic comprehensive school in England, in Southdene. St Kevin's RC School had over 2000 boys, and was the largest comprehensive school in England.

== Notable former pupils ==
=== St Gregory's Catholic School ===
- Margi Clarke (b. 1954) - actress
- Angela Clarke (b. 1969) - actress
- Sharon Maughan (b. 1950) - actress
- Tricia Penrose (b. 1970) - actress who plays Gina Ward in Heartbeat

=== St Kevin's RC School ===
- Phil Redmond (b. 1949) - television drama producer, known for Grange Hill, Brookside and Hollyoaks
- John Conteh (b. 1951) - boxer
- Terry McDermott (b. 1951) - footballer, Liverpool F.C.
- Ed Sweeney (b. 1954) - trade unionist, General Secretary UNIFI (trade union) (1999-2004)
- Andrew Schofield (b. 1958) - actor, starred in Alan Bleasdale's Scully (TV series)
- Nicky Allt (b. 1960) - playwright

=== All Saints Catholic High School ===
- Bobby Schofield - Actor

== See also ==
- St Gregory's Catholic School, Kent
- St Gregory's Roman Catholic Science College, north-west London
