= Lost Soul (play) =

Play written by Dave Kirby

Lost Soul is a play written by Dave Kirby, and performed at the Royal Court Theatre, Liverpool from 31 August to 29 September 2007.

"In the 1970s Donna and Pat felt like the Pointer Sisters and they were looking for Hall and Oates. 30 years on and they feel like the ugly sisters and they found Laurel and Hardy. What happened to the fun times? Is the grass greener on the other side? Why has that daft get picked a fight with a bouncer?"

== Cast ==
- Donna - Lindzi Germain
- Smigger - Andrew Schofield
- Pat - Eithne Browne
- Terry - Neil Caple
- Barman - Lenny Wood
- The Lion - Danny O'Brien
- Girl - Jessica Schofield

== Production team ==
- Director - Bob Eaton
- Production Manager - David Gordon
- Set Design - Billy Meall
- Lighting Design - Rob Beamer
- Sound Design - Charlie Brown
- Musical Director - Howard Gray/Adam Keast
- Producer - Kevin Fearon
- Chief LX & Lighting Operator - Andrew Patterson
- Sound Operator - Liam McDermott
- Stage Manager - Nicola Donithorn
- DSM - Ben Cowper
- Stage Crew & Flys - Mark Goodall
- Costume Supervisor - Marie Jones
