= One Night in Istanbul =

2014 British comedy-drama film directed by James Marquand

- Theatrical release poster
- Directed by: James Marquand
- Written by: Nicky Allt
- Based on: One Night in Istanbul by Nicky Allt
- Produced by: Nicky Allt; Peter Slack; Matthew Whyte; Krystian Kozlowski
- Starring: Steven Waddington; Paul Barber; Lucien Laviscount; Samantha Womack
- Production companies: Big Ears Entertainment; Karma Film Productions; Stray Dog Films
- Distributed by: Stray Dog Films; Liverpool F.C.
- Release date: 10 September 2014
- Running time: 93 minutes
- Country: United Kingdom
- Language: English

One Night in Istanbul, also known as One Night in Istanbul: The Movie, is a British comedy-drama film, directed by James Marquand and produced/written by Nicky Allt. The film stars Steven Waddington, Paul Barber, Lucien Laviscount, Samantha Womack, and Ingvar Eggert Sigurðsson. It is based on the play of the same name by Nicky Allt.

The film's trailer was revealed on 8 August 2014 and was released on 11 September 2014 exclusively at Odeon Cinemas in the United Kingdom and Ireland. The film was released worldwide on 15 September.

== Plot ==
Two down-on-their-luck Liverpool cabbies, Tommy and Gerry, strike a deal with a local gangster to take their sons on a trip to watch their respective football team play in the European Cup Final, in Istanbul, against AC Milan. Hoping to use the trip as a chance to bond with their sons, trouble awaits them in the form of a seductive hotel chambermaid, two ruthless crooks on a mission and a bag of counterfeit cash".

== Cast ==
- Steven Waddington as Tommy
- Paul Barber as Gerry
- Lucien Laviscount as Joseph
- Samantha Womack as Carmella Jones
- Gamze Seber as Leyla
- Ingvar Eggert Sigurðsson as Altan
- Mark Womack as Tony Fitz
- Natasha Jones as Tia Edwards

== Release ==
The premiere was held on 10 September 2014 at the Odeon Cinema in Liverpool One and was attended by Steven Gerrard and Jamie Carragher alongside more Liverpool players. The film went on general release in the UK on 11 September. The film was released in the UK on DVD on 2 February 2015.
