= Royal Court Theatre, Liverpool =

Theatre in Liverpool, England

Royal Court Theatre
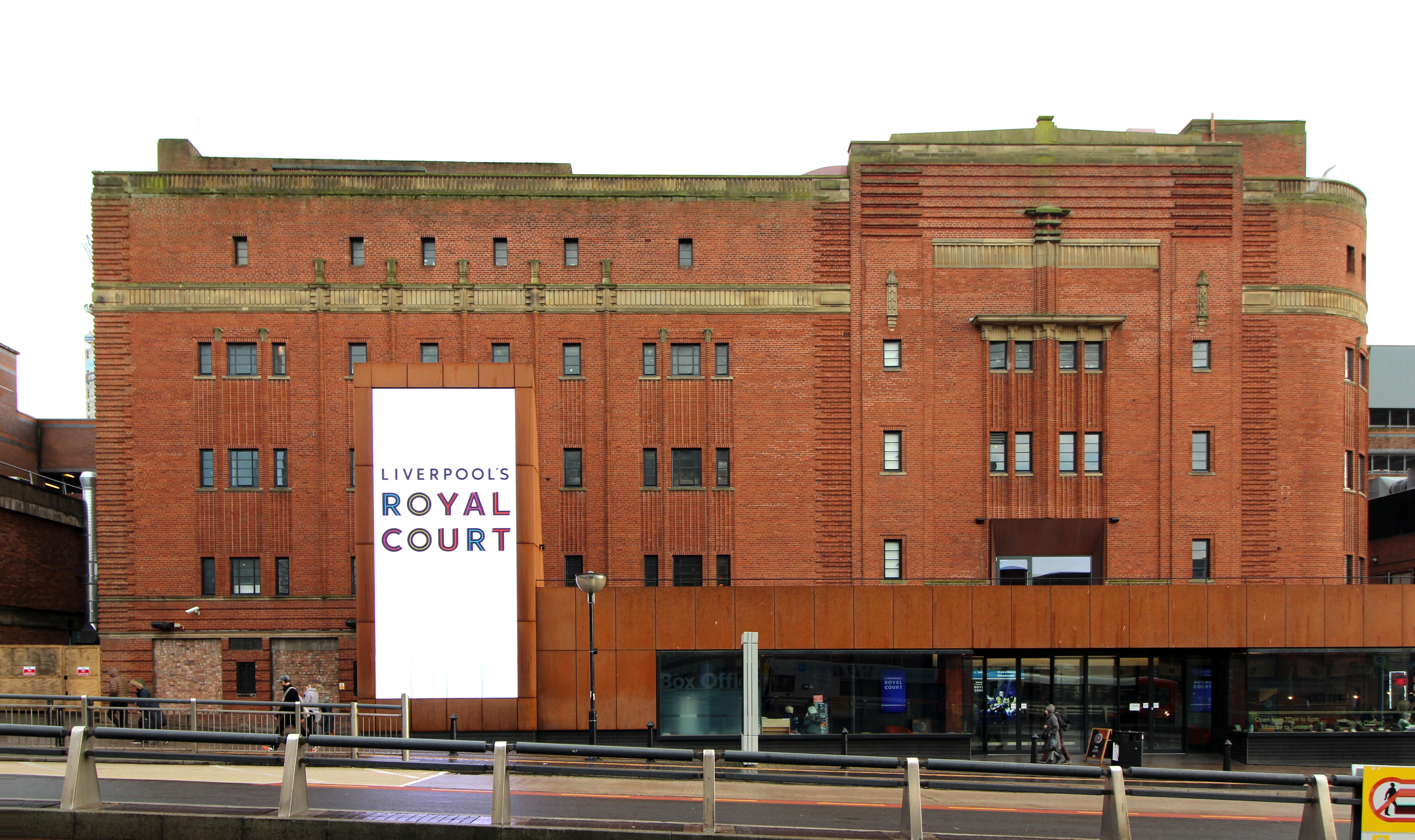
- Front elevation on Roe Street
- Interactive map of Royal Court Theatre
- Address: 1 Roe Street
- Location: Liverpool, Merseyside, England
- Coordinates: 53.4074°N 2.9813°W
- Capacity: 1,186 seats
- Type: theatre
- Events: Theatre, Musical, Concerts
- Public transit: Lime Street railway station

Construction
- Groundbreaking: March 1938
- Opened: 17 October 1938
- Architect: James Bushell Hutchins

Website
- liverpoolsroyalcourt.com

Liverpool's Royal Court Theatre is a theatre located at 1 Roe Street in Liverpool, England. The current Royal Court Theatre was opened on 17 October 1938, after fire destroyed its predecessor. It was rebuilt in Art Deco style and soon became Liverpool's premier theatre. The interior of the building has a nautical theme, in line with Liverpool's seafaring traditions. The design of the basement lounge was based on the Cunard liner Queen Mary until its conversion into the Studio space during renovations. There are three viewing levels within the main auditorium: the Stalls, the Grand Circle and the Balcony.

Although the Liverpool Blitz during the Second World War destroyed many of the buildings around it, the Royal Court itself remained intact. Throughout the war, many well-known artists performed here, including Ivor Novello, Margot Fonteyn, Margery Manners and John Gielgud. Richard Burton made his stage debut here and Judi Dench made her professional stage debut in September 1957. In the 1980s it became home to rock and pop concerts, hosting artists such as the Smiths, Slade, Kraftwerk, Tangerine Dream, Rage Against the Machine, R.E.M., Iron Maiden, David Bowie, Ozzy Osbourne, Roger Taylor, Brian May, U2, and George Michael. In 1990 the building was listed as Grade II, highlighting its major part of Liverpool's heritage.

In 2005 Rawhide Comedy Club took ownership of the building. Following two years of stand-up comedy, with a break in 2006 to produce Brick Up The Mersey Tunnels, they began producing plays all year round in 2007. The theatre has produced more than 100 shows since 2007, including Council Depot Blues, The Royal, Mam! I'm 'Ere and a sell out series of Christmas shows including Scouse Pacific, Little Scouse On The Prairie, The Hitchhiker's Guide To Fazakerley, The Scouse Nativity, The Scouse Cinderella and The Scouse Snow White.

== History ==
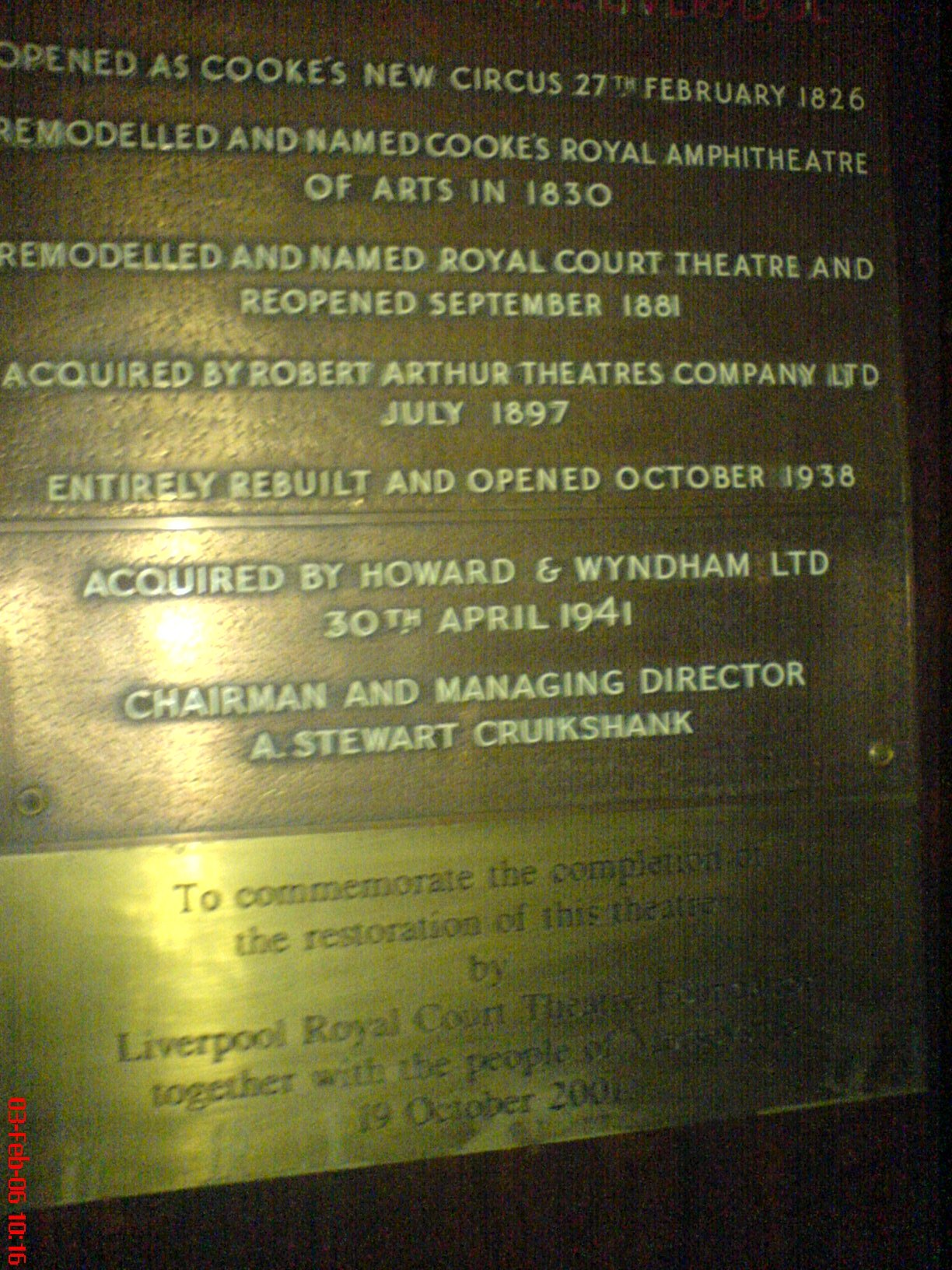
Plaque in foyer

The site of the Royal Court Theatre was originally that of a water well constructed in the 12th century. A circus owner, John Cooke, bought the site in 1826 for his circuses, plays, operas and concerts, and it became known as 'Cooke's Royal Amphitheatre of Arts'. During this time Pablo Fanque, the black circus performer and proprietor immortalised in the Beatles' song "Being for the Benefit of Mr. Kite!", performed here as a part of William Batty's circus. In 1881, the building was redesigned by Henry Sumner as a regular theatre and it was re-opened as the Royal Court.

In 1896 the theatre was taken over by Robert Arthur of Glasgow, who in 1897 put all his theatres into a limited company quoted on the Stock Exchanges, the Robert Arthur Theatres Ltd. In 1912, following Arthur's bankruptcy, the shareholders appointed as chairman Michael Simons of the Theatre Royal, Glasgow, chairman and creator in 1895 of Howard & Wyndham Ltd. The direction and programming of the theatre, embracing plays, musicals, revues, opera and pantomime, now passed to Howard & Wyndham Ltd, chaired by Simons with its managing director Fred Wyndham, who would be followed in 1928 by A. Stewart Cruikshank after his King's Theatre, Edinburgh had joined the Howard & Wyndham group.

A fire destroyed the building in 1933. Five years after demolition, construction works began in March 1938 to ensure the theatre was rebuilt and reopened in October of the same year. The title deeds of the theatre changed to Howard & Wyndham in 1941.

The current Royal Court Theatre was opened on 17 October 1938. It had been totally rebuilt in Art Deco style to the designs of architect James Bushell Hutchins; its splendor and grandeur made it Liverpool's number one theatre. The interior of the building has a nautical theme, in line with Liverpool's seafaring traditions. The design of the basement lounge is based on the Cunard liner Queen Mary, which had been launched on the Clyde two years before the 1938 reopening. There are three viewing levels within the main auditorium: the Stalls, the Grand Circle, and the Balcony.

Although the Liverpool Blitz during the Second World War destroyed many of the buildings around it, the Royal Court itself remained intact. Throughout the war, many well-known artists performed in the Royal Court, including Ivor Novello, Margot Fonteyn and John Gielgud. Richard Burton made his stage debut at the Royal Court in an Emlyn Williams production. The 22-year-old Judi Dench made her professional stage debut here in September 1957, playing Ophelia in an Old Vic production of Hamlet

In 1980, two former Liverpool taxi drivers took the Royal Court in a new direction, moving away from traditional plays and instead of transferring the focus to rock and pop concerts. Their first year ended promisingly and proved to be a successful strategy for the venue, which went on to play host to artists as internationally famous as Tangerine Dream, Rage Against the Machine, R.E.M., Iron Maiden, David Bowie, Ozzy Osbourne, Roger Taylor, Brian May, U2 and George Michael.

The music videos for "Let It Go", "High 'n' Dry (Saturday Night)", and "Bringin' On the Heartbreak" by the British rock band Def Leppard were directed by Doug Smith and shot on 22 July 1981. The photo on the "Let It Go" single cover was taken from that shoot.

In 1983, rock group Slade performed their last live UK concert with the original lineup featuring Noddy Holder.

In 1990, the building was listed as Grade II, highlighting the fact that it is a major part of Liverpool's heritage.

In 2005 Rawhide Comedy Club took ownership of the building. Following two years of stand-up comedy, with a break in 2006 to produce Brick Up The Mersey Tunnels, they began producing plays all year round in 2007.

== Present ==
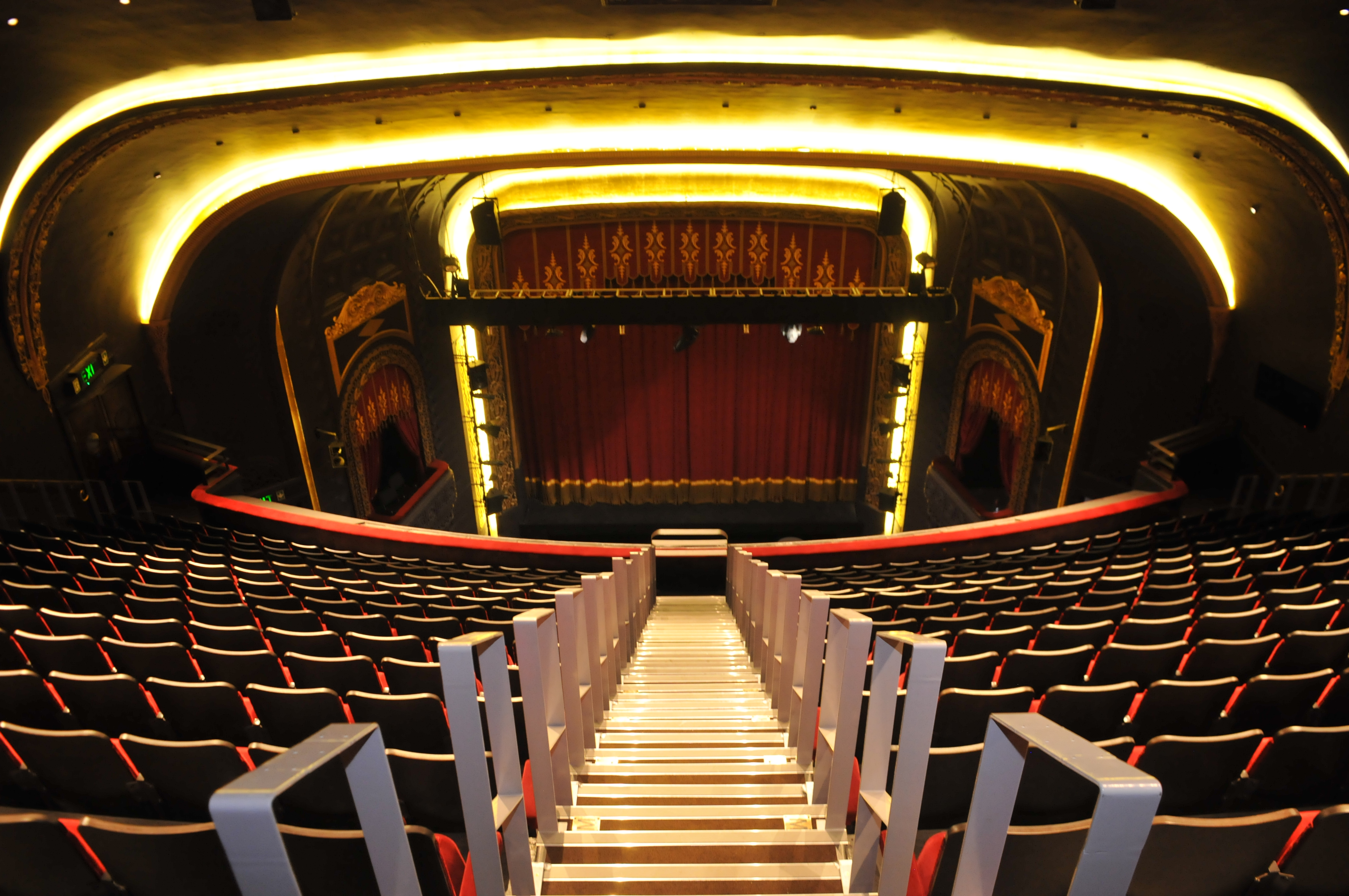
View of the stage from the Balcony.

The stalls are now set out in a three-tier cabaret-style arrangement with tables and chairs and a bar at the rear of the stalls. The current capacity is 1,186 (Stalls 290 [cabaret,] Circle 403, Balcony 493). Audience members can dine before the show in the stalls seating.

Following two years of being the home to the Rawhide Comedy Club, the Royal Court made a move back to producing theatre in the summer of 2007 with the sell-out re-run of Brick Up the Mersey Tunnels.

Since then, the theatre has undergone extensive refurbishment which completed its third 'Act' in January 2018.

In 2010 the theatre began their sell out Variety Lunch Club series which provides lunch, a cup of tea, a singer, and a comedian for £6. More than 1,200 people a month come to these Wednesday afternoon shows.

The theatre also offers free to access groups including a Community Choir and a Youth Theatre for young people aged 11 and up.

The theatre has produced shows such as Council Depot Blues, The Royal, Mam! I'm 'Ere and best-selling Christmas show The Scouse Nativity.

Liverpool's Royal Court became a National Portfolio Organisation and has been receiving Arts Council funding since April 2018. In 2018 it also launched Boisterous Theatre Company, Liverpool's only company dedicated to promoting BAME talent.

The theatre has produced more than 100 shows since 2007, including Council Depot Blues, The Royal, Mam! I'm 'Ere and a sell out series of Christmas shows including Scouse Pacific, Little Scouse On The Prairie, The Hitchhiker's Guide To Fazakerley, The Scouse Nativity, The Scouse Cinderella, and The Scouse Snow White. For a full list of shows see below.

== Technical ==
=== Flying ===
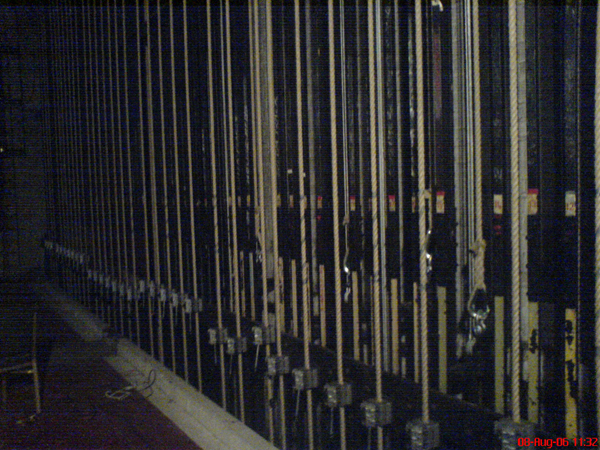
The counterweight fly system as it is now

The counterweight fly system has recently been refurbished. There were originally in excess of 70 fly lines, however, this has been reduced to about half that number in order to increase the distance between bars.

The original brakes have now been removed. They screwed shut and could hinge open to completely release the rope.

=== Lighting ===
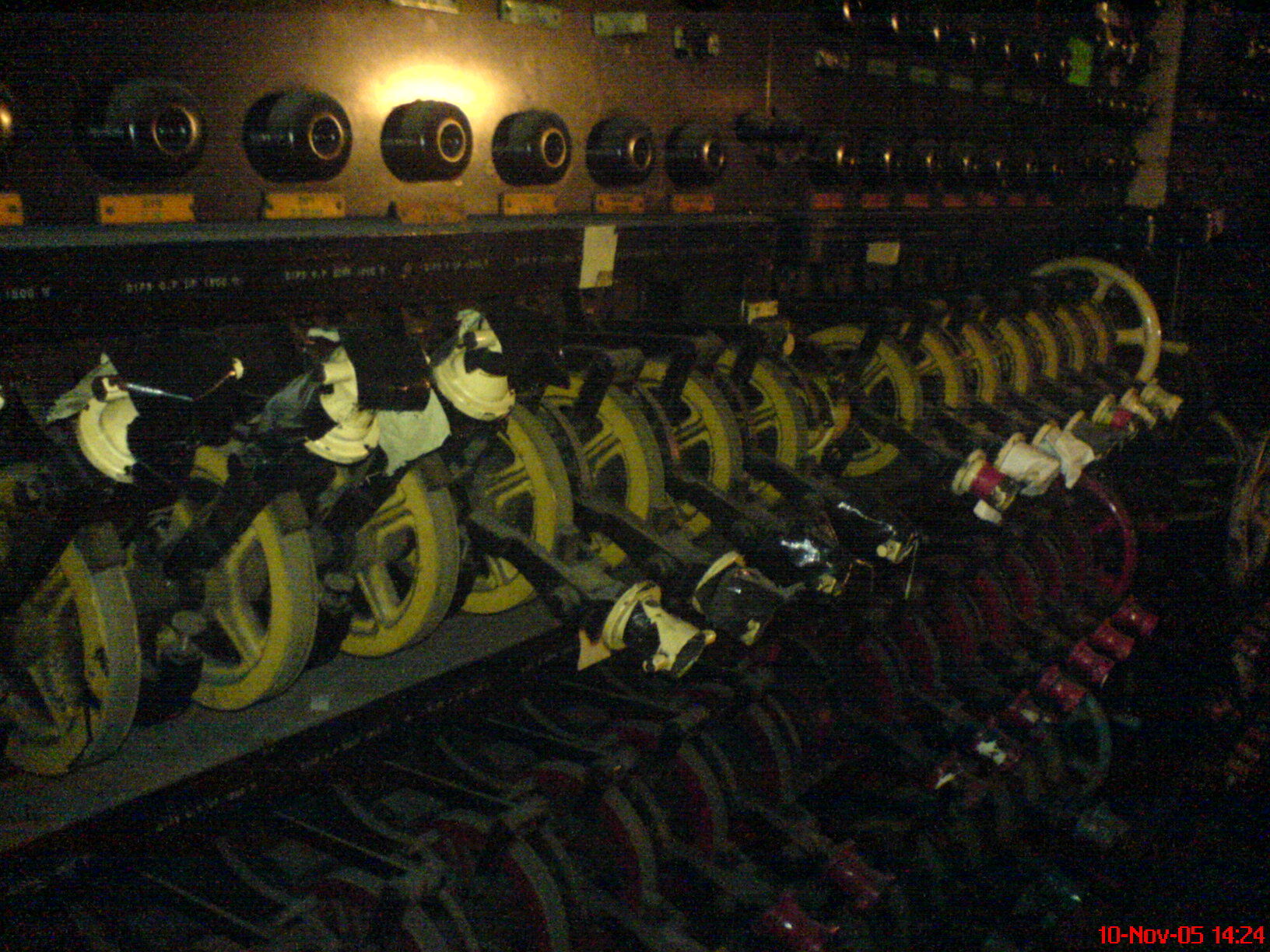
The Grandmaster lighting control

The lighting was controlled by a 'Grandmaster' which was situated on a perch about 8 feet above the stage floor on Stage Right. This would have been operated by two people and was in operation until the 1980s. It was only disconnected from the power in June 2006.

The lighting is now controlled through an ETC GIO. The venue’s old incandescent rig has also been replaced with LED alternatives, predominantly ETC Lustr 2 fixtures.

=== Rigging ===
FOH there is a 12 m A-type truss hung from 2 lodestar 1-ton motors. This is used for most of the FOH rigging. There are also truss booms either side of the stage, FOH.

=== Revolving Stage ===
The refurbishment saw the restoration of the original revolving stage, the biggest outside of London.

== Shows ==
=== Pantomime ===
With no television and no cinema, Liverpool audiences of the late 19th century flocked to the theatre. Liverpool possessed no less than 26 theatres and 38 music halls. The main theatres towards the end of the century were the Prince Of Wales in Clayton Square (opened 1861) the Shakespeare Theatre off London Road (opened 1866) and the Royal Court Theatre.

The site of the Royal Court had been a theatre for many years. As Cookes Royal Amphitheatre of Arts, up to 4,000 people would gather to attend plays, operas, concerts and circus. In 1881 as ownership of the theatre changed, it was rebuilt and renamed The Royal Court Theatre. Along with the three other theatres it presented an annual pantomime.

The Victorian pantomime was not only the template for today's show but very much a vehicle for music. The Poluski Brothers were among the stars who featured. Combining a mixture of music hall, comic opera and a large chunk of spectacle, the pantomime appealed to all levels of society. The first Royal Court pantomime, or "annual" as it was known, was Babes in the Wood. It is not clear whether this was a success or not, but no further pantomime was produced at the Court for fourteen years until 1895 with the presentation of Dick Whittington.

Three years later, Arthur Lawrence was appointed the theatre manager. Starting with Aladdin, it was Lawrence who put the Royal Court firmly in the centre of the panto map. The biggest music hall stars of the day would appear in the Court's "annual". George Robey, Harry Lauder, Little Hetty King as Aladdin Tich, the Three Sisters Levey, and the Poluski Brothers all helped to make the Royal Court's pantomime among the most famous in Britain. With the ownership of the theatre passing to Howard & Wyndhams Ltd at the turn of the century, the growth of pantomime blossomed.

Arthur Lawrence quoted in The Liverpudlian, November 1938:

In 1906, in Aladdin, I had Hetty King and [Happy Fanny Fields], together with Malcolm Scott and Harry Tate-some combination. I produced at the Court, in twenty-six years, twenty pantomimes. The 1906 panto was the biggest success. We averaged takings of just under £2,000 a week, and that in a theatre supposed to hold no more than about £275 at full capacity. Our pantomimes would run elsewhere for about five years, so Liverpool was thus a pantomime manufacturing centre. 'Happy' Fanny Fields, They were all made here—scenery, dresses, jokes and music, and all. I may mention, also, that we had a stage unsurpassed for its equipment. Every kind of trap ever known on a stage was in being.

That pantomime Aladdin was repeated, with almost the same cast, at the Adelphi Theatre in London the following year. "A chorus of over 100 Voices" boasted the posters. A magazine was produced in Liverpool solely devoted to pantomimes.

[Fanny Fields] in Aladdin By the 1920s the death of Music Hall was underway, and the Royal Court panto mirrored its decline. Hetty King Gone were the stars with their own personal songs to be replaced by "free" songs that anyone could sing. The Royal Court panto ended, replaced each Christmas by musical comedy, or a visit by the D’Oyly Carte Opera Company.

Upon re-opening some years after its fire in 1938, its first Panto was Humpty Dumpty, starring Gene Gerrard, Bobbie Comber, the Tiller Girls, and a cast "of Over 80". The consecutive run of pantomime was not to be, With another World War the Howard and Wyndham's—Babes in the Wood spectacle of pantomime found itself replaced with the comedy The Eric Maschwitz revue, featuring a young Charles Hawtrey (of later Carry On Fame) performing female impersonations. The following year Vivien Leigh appeared in The Doctor's Dilemma.

It was not until 1943, with the arrival of A. Stewart Cruickshank as managing director that pantomime returned, again starting with Babes In The Wood. By the 1960s television comedians and pop stars became the new stars of panto. In 1956, young heart throb Dickie Valentine took on the role of Aladdin. By the end of the fifties, facing stiff competition and dwindling audiences, the Royal Court Pantomime began a slow lingering death. In the Sixties occasional pantomimes (always Cinderella) were interspersed by Christmas shows by Ken Dodd, Dora Bryan, Frankie Vaughan, the Bachelors and the Black & White Minstrels.

Howard & Wyndham's financial problems increased, and the Royal Court was offered to the City Council to purchase. They refused. An attempt to open the Court as a Bingo Hall in 1968 was abandoned after eight months. There was no Christmas show after Aladdin in 1975. An attempt to revive panto in 1981 with Snow White was not successful, and pantomimes were no longer performed at the Royal Court.

In 1997 the Neptune Theatre in Liverpool presented Aladdin at the Court. Following on their success at the Neptune the previous year with Sonia in Dick Whittington, they presented Aladdin starring Julie Goodyear as Mrs. Twankey, and Danny McCall as Aladdin. Since then the Royal Court pantomimes have been Cinderella (1998), Babes in the Wood (1999), Aladdin (2000) and Dick Whittington (2001).

Pantomime returned to the Royal Court in (2006) with Snow White and the Seven Dwarfs starring Hollyoaks' Christina Bailey as Snow White.

== Notable shows ==
=== Slappers and Slapheads ===
- 2003 Performed at The Royal Court, Slappers and Slapheads, written by local Playwrights Len Pentin and Fred Lawless was performed with a mainly local cast and crew. Slappers and Slapheads is returning to the Royal Court in 2009 from Friday 6 February to Saturday 7 March with an all new cast.

=== Brick Up the Mersey Tunnels ===
- 2006, 2007, 2008, 2009, 2011 & 2016

Brick Up the Mersey Tunnels a play with music written by Dave Kirby and Nicky Allt showed in the Royal Court from 3 August to 26 August 2006. This was a huge success and received 9/10 in a review in the Liverpool Echo.

=== Lennon ===
- Performed 2010 and 2013, Lennon is a play by Bob Eaton based on the life of John Lennon. In 2010 the lead role was played by Andrew Schofield, in 2013 by John Power. The musical premiered in 1981 at the Everyman Theatre, Liverpool and was shown Off-Broadway, New York in 1982. Its 1985 London Astoria Theatre production won the Sunday Times Award for Best Musical and two Olivier Award nominations.

=== You'll Never Walk Alone ===
- 2011, 2014, 2017 & 2020

The story of the Liverpool Football Club, written by Nicky Allt.

=== Stags and Hens ===
- 2008 – Stags and Hens by Willy Russell

=== The Miracle of Great Homer Street ===
- 2018

Starring Les Dennis and Andrew Schofield, TMOGHS is written by Gerry Linford, winner of 'Highly Commended Award' by Liverpool Hope Playwriting Prize

=== Girls Don't Play Guitars ===
- 2019 & 2020

Musical that tells the story of The Liverbirds, an all-female beat group in the 1960s. The show attracted attention in the story of The Liverbirds and was featured in a short documentary by the New York Times.

== Full list of shows ==
Show Title	Dates	Cast	Creatives
2006			
Brick Up The Mersey Tunnels	3 to 26 August 2006	Roy Brandon, Eithne Browne, Carl Chase, Suzanne Collins, Davy Edge, Adam Keast, Andrew Schofield and Francis Tucker	Written by Dave Kirby & Nicky Allt. Directed by Bob Eaton. Designed by Billy Meall
2007			
Brick Up The Mersey Tunnels	13 July to 25 August 2007	Roy Brandon, Eithne Browne, Carl Chase, Suzanne Collins, Davy Edge, Adam Keast, Andrew Schofield and Francis Tucker	Written by Dave Kirby & Nicky Allt. Directed by Bob Eaton. Designed by Billy Meall
Lost Soul	31 August to 29 September 2007	Eithne Browne, Neil Caple, Lindzi Germain and Andrew Schofield	Written by Dave Kirby. Directed by Bob Eaton. Designed by Billy Meall
Good Golly Miss Molly	5 October to 3 November 2007	Sonia, Davy Edge, Carl Chase, Phil Corbitt, Andrew Schofield, Eithne Browne, Roy Brandon, Phil Hearne, Kevin Tucker, Shirley Darroch	Written & Directed by Bob Eaton
Two	9 to 24 November	Eithne Brown, Neil Caple	Written by Jim Cartwright. Directed by Bob Eaton
2008			
Stags and Hens	1 February to 1 March	Suzanne Collins, Laura Dos Santos, Stephen Fletcher, Gillian Hardie, Kevin Harvey, Shaun Mason, Danny O’Brien, Jane Radley, Rachel Rae, James Spofforth, Keddy Sutton & Lenny Wood	Written by Willy Russell Directed by Bob Eaton
Brick Up The Mersey Tunnels	14 March to 12 April	Roy Brandon, Eithne Browne, Carl Chase, Suzanne Collins, Davy Edge, Adam Keast, Andrew Schofield and Francis Tucker	Written by Dave Kirby & Nicky Allt. Directed by Bob Eaton
On The Ledge	25 April to 24 May	Lenny Wood, Roy Brandon, Andrew Schofield, Neil Caple, Louis Emerick, Neil Fitzmaurice, Gary Bleasdale, Dave Hart and Gillian Hardie	Written by Alan Bleasdale. Directed by Bob Eaton
Misery	14 June to 5 July	Joan Kempson and Andrew Schofield	Written by Stephen King, Adapted by Simon Moore. Directed by Noreen Kershaw
Eight Miles High	18 July to 16 August	Eithne Browne, Paul Broughton, Keith Carter, Zita Frith, Rosie Jenkins, James Lindsay, Jake Norton, Iwan Rheon, Andrew Schofield, Francis Tucker and Tim Whitnall	Written & Directed by Jim Cartwright
Lost Soul	5 to 27 September	Eithne Browne, Gary Bleasdale, Lindzi Germain and Andrew Schofield	Written by Dave Kirby. Directed by Bob Eaton
Council Depot Blues	31 October to 29 November	Jake Abraham, Roy Brandon, Paul Broughton, Howard Gray, Lindzi Germain, Phil Hearne, Shaun Mason, Andrew Schofield	Written by Dave Kirby. Directed by Bob Eaton.
Night Collar	11 December to 24 January	Eithne Browne, Roy Carruthers, Chris Darwin, Roy Davis, Lindzi Germain, Andrew Schofield, Peter Washington, Lenny Wood	Written by Tony Furlong & Jimmy Power. Directed by Bob Eaton.
2009			
Slappers and Slapheads	6 February to 7 March	Helen Carter, Warren Donnelly, Gillian Hardie, Mike Neary, Alan Stocks and Keddy Sutton. Guest star Pete Price	Written by Fred Lawless & Len Pentin. Directed by Bob Eaton.
Dirty Dusting	13 March to 11 April	Eithne Browne, Clare Bowles, Pauline Daniels and Alan Stocks	Written by Ed Waugh & Trevor Wood. Directed by Ken Alexander.
Shirley Valentine	23 April to 9 May	Pauline Daniels	Written by Willy Russell. Directed by Glen Walford.
The Flags	29 May to 27 June	Andrew Schofield, Kieran Cunningham, Eamonn Owens, Jessica Regan	Written by Bridget O’Connor. Directed by Greg Hersov. Designed by Laurie Dennett.
Brick Up The Mersey Tunnels	10 July to 22 August	Roy Brandon, Eithne Browne, Carl Chase, Suzanne Collins, Davy Edge, Adam Keast, Andrew Schofield and Francis Tucker	Written by Dave Kirby & Nicky Allt. Directed by Bob Eaton.
Our Day Out	11 September to 17 October	Bradley Clarkson, Holly Quin-Ankrah, Gillian Hardie, Andrew Schofield, Michael Starke, Sophie Fraser, Chris Mason, Abby Mavers and Jack Rigby	Written by Willy Russell. Directed by Bob Eaton.
The Salon	30 October to 28 November	Lynne Francis, Lynn Fitzgerald, Suzanne Collins, Roy Brandon, James Spofforth, Danny O'Brien and Nicola Bolton	Written by Drew Quayle. Directed by Bob Eaton.
Merry Ding Dong	11 December to 23 January	Lindzi Germain, Jake Abraham, Stephen Aintree, Stephen Fletcher, Rachel Rae, Alan Stocks and Eithne Browne	Written by Fred Lawless. Directed by Bob Eaton.
2010			
Funny Money	29 January to 27 February	Mark Bixter, Eithne Browne, Neil Caple, Roy Carruthers, Roy Davis, Jane Hogarth, Mark Moraghan and Alan Stocks	Written by Ray Cooney. Directed by Leslie Lawton.
Lucky Numbers	12 March to 10 April	Sheila Reid, Chris Crookall, Pauline Fleming, Kris Mochrie, Mike Neary, Rachel Rae and Michael Starke	Written by Mike Yeaman. Directed by Ken Alexander.
A Fistful Of Collars	16 April to 15 May	Jake Abraham, Eithne Browne, Suzanne Collins, Pauline Daniels, Lindzi Germain, Alan Stocks and Lenny Wood	Written by Fred Lawless. Directed by Bob Eaton.
Ladies Night	28 May to 26 June	Nicola Bolton, Roy Carruthers, Michael Ledwich, Jack Lord, Lorenzo Martelli, Phil Perez, Alan Stocks and Stuart Wade	Written by Anthony McCarten and Steven Sinclair. Adapted and Directed by Leslie Lawton.
Night Collar	30 June to 10 July	Louis Emerick, Eithne Browne, Lindzi Germain, Danny O’Brien and Alan Stocks	Written by Tony Furlong and Jimmy Power. Directed by Sylvie Gatrill.
Council Depot Blues	16 July to 7 August	Jake Abraham, Roy Brandon, Paul Broughton, Howard Gray, Lindzi Germain, Phil Hearne, Shaun Mason, Andrew Schofield	Written by Dave Kirby. Directed by Bob Eaton.
Our Day Out	27 August to 9 October	Kieran Cunningham, Pauline Daniels, Stephen Fletcher, Mark Moraghan, Georgina White, Sophie Fraser, Chris Mason, Abby Mavers and Jack Rigby	Written by Willy Russell. Directed by Bob Eaton.
Lennon	15 October to 13 November	Andrew Schofield, Daniel Healy, Stephen Fletcher, Chris Grahamson, Adam Keast, Maria Lawson, Paul Mannion, Jonathan Markwood and Nicky Swift	Written and Directed by Bob Eaton.
Scouse Pacific	26 November to 22 January	Paul Duckworth, Stephen Fletcher, Lindzi Germain, Rachel Rae, Andrew Schofield and Alan Stocks	Written by Fred Lawless. Directed by Bob Eaton.
2011			
Brick Up The Mersey Tunnels	17 June to 30 July	Roy Brandon, Eithne Browne, Carl Chase, Suzanne Collins, Davy Edge, Adam Keast, Andrew Schofield and Francis Tucker	Written by Dave Kirby & Nicky Allt. Directed by Bob Eaton.
You'll Never Walk Alone	30 September to 29 October	Pauline Daniels, Jamie Hampson, Mark Moraghan, Anthony Watson, Lenny Wood, Howard Gray, Anthony Godfrey, Adam Keast, Chris Grahamson, Dan McIntyre	Written by Nicky Allt. Directed by Bob Eaton.
Little Scouse On The Prairie	25 November to 21 January	Paul Duckworth, Stephen Fletcher, Lindzi Germain, Rachel Rae, Andrew Schofield and Alan Stocks	Written by Fred Lawless and Directed by Bob Eaton.
Snow White	9 December to 8 December	Tina Malone, Jamie Rickers, Pete Price, Leanne Campbell, Mickey Finn, Chris Crookall and James Waud	Directed by Jane Joseph.
2012			
Reds And Blues - The Musical	29 June to 28 July	Paul Duckworth, Lynne Francis, Lindzi Germain, Andrew Schofield, Alan Stocks and Francis Tucker	Written by Dave Kirby. Directed by Bob Eaton.
Macbeth	21 September to 13 October	Zoe Lister, Michael Ryan, Shaun Mason, Jack Lord, Jack Rigby, Adam Search, Harriet Barrow, Jamie Clarke and Richard Hand	Directed by Max Rubin.
A Midsummer Night's Dream	21 September to 13 October	Zoe Lister, Michael Ryan, Shaun Mason, Jack Lord, Jack Rigby, Adam Search, Harriet Barrow, Jamie Clarke and Richard Hand	Directed by Max Rubin.
Jigsy	23 October to 3 November	Les Dennis	Written by Tony Staveacre. Directed by Hannah Chiswick.
A Nightmare On Lime Street	23 November to 26 January	Mark Moraghan, Michael Starke, Jamie Hampson, Lynn Francis, Anthony Watson and Lenny Wood	Written by Fred Lawless. Directed by Ken Alexander.
2013			
Hope		Scott Williams, Mark Womack, Samantha Womack and Rene Zagger	Written and Directed by Scott Williams.
Down Our Street		Roy Brandon, Lesley Butler, Suzanne Collins, Micky Finn, Lynne Fitzgerald, Lindzi Germain, Crissy Rock and Lenny Wood	Written and Directed by Brian McCann.
Ladies Day	14 June to 13 July	Eithne Browne, Lynn Francis, Jack Lord, Roxanne Pallett and Angela Simms	Written by Amanda Whittington. Directed by Ken Alexander.
Bouncers	19 July to 17 August	Paul Broughton, Danny O’Brien, Michael Starke and Mark Womack	Written by John Godber. Directed by Bob Eaton.
Lennon	23 August to 14 September	John Power, Matt Breen, Tom Connor, Jessica Dyas, Kirsten Foster, Ross Higginson, Adam Keast, Jonathan Markwood and Mark Newnham	Written and Directed by Bob Eaton.
Sons Of The Desert	27 September to 26 October	Roy Brandon, Michael Starke, Matt Connor, Lori Haley Fox, Jonathan Markwood and Penelope Woodman	Directed by Ken Alexander.
The Hitchhiker's Guide To Fazakerley	22 November to 11 January	Michael Starke, Lindzi Germain, Lynn Francis, Angela Simms and Jack Rigby	Written by Fred Lawless. Directed by Ken Alexander.
2014			
Once A Catholic	22 January to 8 February	Richard Bremmer, Calum Callaghan, Sean Campion, Clare Cathcart, Oliver Coopersmith, Kate Lock, Molly Logan, Amy Morgan, Katherine Rose Morley and Cecilia Noble	Written by Mary J O’Malley. Directed by Kathy Burke.
You'll Never Walk Alone	7 to 30 March	Jake Abraham, Lindzi Germain, Howard Gray, Emily Linden, Mark Moraghan, Stephen Pallister, Rachael Rae, Dan Ross, Francis Tucker and Lenny Wood	Written by Nicky Allt. Directed by Bob Eaton.
Special Measures	4 April to 3 May	Paul Broughton, Eithne Browne, Stephen Fletcher, Jessica Guise, Colin Hoult, Adam Search, Angela Simms and Michael Starke	Written by Mark Davies Markham. Directed by Ken Alexander.
Sex And The Suburbs	9 May to 7 June	Lindzi Germain, Carl Patrick and Claire Sweeney	Written by Mandy Muden and Claire Sweeney. Directed by Ken Alexander.
Lennon	13 June to 19 July	John Power, Tom Connor, Kirsten Foster, Ross Higginson, Adam Keast, Jonathan Markwood, Mark Newnham, Daniel McIntyre and Nicky Swift	Written and Directed by Bob Eaton.
Bouncers	25 July to 16 August	Paul Broughton, Danny O’Brien, Michael Starke and Louis Emerick	Written by John Godber. Directed by Bob Eaton.
Noises Off	5 September to 4 October	Kim Hartman, Tupele Dorgu, Jonathan Markwood, Stephen Fletcher, Jessica Dyas, Danny O'Brien, Christopher Jordan and Jennifer Bea	Written by Michael Frayn. Directed by Bob Eaton.
Scouse Of The Antarctic	21 November to 17 January	Michael Starke, Lindzi Germain, Helen Carter, Michael Ledwich, John McGrellis, Michael Fletcher and Hayley Hampson	Written by Fred Lawless. Directed by Howard Gray.
2015			
Canoeing For Beginners	30 January to 28 February	Pauline Fleming, Stephen Fletcher, Harry Katsari, Michael Ledwich, John McArdle and Angela Simms	Written by Mike Yeaman. Directed by Cal McCrystal.
Shed	10 April to 9 May	Paul Broughton and Michael Starke	Written by Paul Broughton and Michael Starke. Directed by Bob Eaton.
Night Collar	15 May to 13 June	Alan Stocks, Jake Abraham, Eithne Browne, Suzanne Collins, Michael Ledwich and Lenny Wood	Written by Tony Furlong and Jimmy Power. Directed by Bob Eaton.
Mam! I'm 'Ere	26 June to 1 August	Andrew Schofield, Alan Stocks, Paul Duckworth, Keddy Sutton, Eithne Browne, and Rachel Rae, Helen Carter, Michael Fletcher, Hayley Hampson and Jamie Hampson	Written and Directed by Stephen Fletcher.
Bouncers	4 September to 3 October	Paul Broughton, Danny O’Brien, Michael Starke and Andrew Schofield	Written by John Godber. Directed by Bob Eaton.
Let It Be	8 October to 14 November	Emanuele Angeletti, Paul Canning, Paul Mannion, Luke Roberts, Reuven Gershon, Ian B Garcia, Luke Roberts and Chris McBurney	
Pharoah 'Cross The Mersey	27 November to 16 January	Andrew Schofield, Michael Starke, Lindzi Germain, Danny O’Brien, Michael Fletcher, Hayley Hampson Ashlyn Baker, Amara Bjorkhaug, Natasha Riley and Leah Whiteside	Written by Fred Lawless. Directed by Howard Gray.
2016			
Brick Up The Mersey Tunnel	29 January to 5 March	Roy Brandon, Eithne Browne, Carl Chase, Suzanne Collins, Paul Duckworth, Adam Keast, Andrew Schofield and Francis Tucker	Written by Dave Kirby & Nicky Allt. Directed by Bob Eaton.
Down The Dock Road	11 March to 9 April	Derek Barr, Les Dennis, Paul Duckworth, James Duke, Oliver Farnworth, Michael Ledwich, Nathan McMullen, Conrad Nelson, Andrew Schofield and Daniel Taylor	Written by Alan Bleasdale. Directed by Hannah Chissick.
The Golden Oldies	15 April to 14 May	Ruth Alexander, Eithne Browne, Dennis Conlon, Annie Edwards, Greg Fossard, Hayley Hampson, Phil Hearne, Paul Kissaun and Olwen Rees	Written by Dave Simpson. Directed by Bob Eaton.
Shout!	20 May to 4 June	Emily Chesterton, Hayley Hampson, Miriam O’Brien, Evangeline Pickerill and Katie Tyler	Directed by Francesca Goodridge.
The Royal	17 June to 16 July	Lynn Francis, Lindzi Germain, Alan Stocks, Danny O’Brien and Angela Simms	Written by Lindzi Germain and Angela Simms with additional material by Cal McCrystal. Directed by Cal McCrystal.
A Fistful Of Collars	22 July to 20 August	Jake Abraham, Eithne Browne, Suzanne Collins, Lindzi Germain, Angela Simms, Alan Stocks and Lenny Wood	Written by Fred Lawless. Directed by Bob Eaton.
Twopence To Cross The Mersey	20 September to 8 October	Jake Abraham, Eithne Browne, Tom Cawte, Roy Carruthers, Emma Dears, Phil Hearne, Chris Jordan, Maria Lovelady	Written by Rob Fennah. Directed by Bob Eaton.
Father O'Flaherty Saves Our Souls	14 October to 12 November	Claire Bowles, Helen Carter, Paul Duckworth, Keddy Sutton and Alan Stocks	Written by Alan Stocks. Directed by Bob Eaton.
Scouse Of The Rising Sun	25 November 14 January	Jake Abraham, Michael Fletcher, Lindzi Germain, Hayley Hampson, Michael Ledwich, Drew Schofield, Alan Stocks and Keddy Sutton	Written by Kevin Fearon. Directed by Bob Eaton.
2017			
Brick Up 2: The Wrath of Ann Twacky	27 January to 25 February	Roy Brandon, Eithne Browne, Danny Burns, Carl Chase, Suzanne Collins, Paul Duckworth and Andrew Schofield	Written by Nicky Allt and Dave Kirby.
Lost Soul	10 March to 8 April	Andrew Schofield, Lindzi Germain, Jake Abraham, Catherine Rice, Lenny Wood, Paislie Reid and James Spofforth	Written by Dave Kirby. Directed by Bob Eaton.
The Lonesome West	21 April to 20 May	Paul Duckworth, Kieran Cunningham, Alan Devally and Anne O'Riordan	Written by Martin McDonagh. Directed by Bob Farquar.
The Royal	25 August to 23 September	Lynn Francis, Lindzi Germain, Alan Stocks, Danny O’Brien and Angela Simms	Written by Lindzi Germain and Angela Simms with additional material by Cal McCrystal. Directed by Cal McCrystal.
You'll Never Walk Alone	28 September to 28 October	Mark Moraghan, Jake Abraham, Lindzi Germain, Lenny Wood, Jamie Clarke, Daniel Ross and Howard Gray	Written by Nicky Allt. Directed by Bob Eaton.
The Scouse Nativity	24 November to 13 January	Andrew Schofield, Hayley Sheen, Lindzi Germain, Paul Duckworth, Stephen Fletcher, Michael Fletcher and Keddy Sutton	Written by Kevin Fearon with additional material from Cal McCrystal. Directed by Cal McCrystal. Designed by Mark Walters.
2018			
Her Benny			Directed by BOST
Council Depot Blues	23 February to 24 March	Jake Abraham, Roy Brandon, Paul Broughton, Lindzi Germain, Howard Gray, Phil Hearne, James Nelson-Joyce, and Andrew Schofield	Written by Dave Kirby. Directed by Bob Eaton.
Liver Birds Flying Home	13 April to 12 May	Lucinda Lawrence, Lesley Moloney, Joanna Monro, Nicola Munns and Mark Rice-Oxley	Based on the TV series The Liver Birds by Carla Lane and Myra Taylor. Lyrics Barb Jungr. Music by Mike Lindup. Book by Barb Jungr, George Seaton and Linda McDermott. Directed by Benji Sperring.
The Miracle of Great Homer Street	1 to 30 June	Les Dennis, Andrew Schofield, Jake Abraham, Katie King, Cath Rice and Bobby Schofield	Written by Gerry Linford. Directed by Bob Eaton.
Mam! I'm 'Ere	13 July to 11 August	Jake Abraham, Eithne Browne, Michael Fletcher, Stephen Fletcher, Lynn Francis, Lindzi Germain, Hayley Sheen, Mia Molloy, Andrew Schofield and Rachael Wood	Written and Directed by Stephen Fletcher.
Boisterous Bouncers	31 August to 15 September	Joe Speare, Zain Salim, Michael Horsley and Mutty Burman	Written by John Godber. Adapted by Maurice Bessman. Directed by Miriam Mussa.
Maggie May	12 October to 10 November	Christina Tedders, Cheryl Fergison, Michael Fletcher, Tom Connor, Matt Ganley, Sam Haywood, David Heywood, Barbara Hockaday, Paislie Reid and Katia Sartini	Written and Directed by Bob Eaton.
The Scouse Cinderella	23 November to 19 January	Andrew Schofield, Hayley Sheen, Lindzi Germain, Paul Duckworth, Stephen Fletcher, Michael Fletcher, Keddy Sutton, Eva McKenna	Written & Directed by Kevin Fearon. Designed by Foxton.
2019			
Yellow Breck Road	1 February to 2 March	Jake Abraham, Gemma Brodrick, Eithne Browne, Paul Duckworth, Lynn Francis and Jamie Greer	Written by Gerry Linford. Directed by Bob Eaton.
Brick Up 2: The Wrath of Ann Twacky	8 March to 6 April	Jake Abraham, Roy Brandon, Eithne Browne, Danny Burns, Suzanne Collins, Paul Duckworth and Andrew Schofield	Written by Nicky Allt & Dave Kirby, Directed by Bob Eaton. Designed by Billy Meall.
My Fairfield Lady	26 April to 25 May	Helen Carter, Jessica Dyas, Julie Glover, Danny O'Brien and Michael Starke	Written by Kevin Fearon. Directed by Chris Mellor. Designed by Olivia Du Monceau.
Lost Soul 2	7 June to 6 July	Jake Abraham, Gemma Brodrick, Lindzi Germain, Cath Rice, Andrew Schofield, Bobby Schofield and Lenny Wood	Written by Dave Kirby. Directed by Bob Eaton. Designed by Jocelyn Meall.
Scouse Pacific	12 July to 10 August	Jake Abraham, Jamie Clarke, Stephen Fletcher, Guy Freeman, Lindzi Germain, Abigail Middleton, Mia Molloy and Michael Starke	Written by Fred Lawless. Directed by Bob Eaton. Designed by Mark Walters.
The Menlove Avenue Murder Mystery	30 August to 21 September	Paul Duckworth, Liam Tobin, Gillian Hardie, Pauline Fleming, Michael Peace and Olivia Sloyan	Written by Gerry Linford. Directed by Chris Mellor. Designed by Foxton.
Girls Don't Play Guitars	4 October to 2 November	Molly Grace Cutler, Alice McKenna, Lisa Wright, Sarah Workman, Jack Alexander, Tom Connor, Tom Dunlea, Guy Freeman, Jonathan Markwood and Mark Newnham	Written by Ian Salmon. Directed by Bob Eaton. Designed by Mark Walters.
The Scouse Snow White	22 November to 18 January	Andrew Schofield, Lindzi Germain, Hayley Sheen, Jamie Clarke, Michael Fletcher, Stephen Fletcher, Keddy Sutton and Samantha Arends	Written by Kevin Fearon. Directed by Chris Mellor. Designed by Olivia Du Monceau.
2020			
Lost In Colomendy	31 January to 29 February	Paul Duckworth, John Evans, Jane Hogarth, Alan Stocks and Liam Tobin	Written by Nicky Allt. Directed by Paul Goetzee. Designed by Alfie Heywood.
Pete Price Is Dead	13 March to 11 April	Leanne Campbell, Michael Fletcher, Lindzi Germain, Ray Quinn, Pete Price, Keddy Sutton and Liam Tobin	Written by Leanne Campbell. Directed by Stephen Fletcher. Designed by Jocelyn Meall. (Show ran until 16 March due to the pandemic)
Jigsy	From 5 June (Online)	Les Dennis	Written by Tony Stavacre. Directed by Hannach Chissick. Designed by Olivia Du Monceau.
Royal Court Selection Box	11 December to 30 January	Jake Abraham, Roy Brandon, Eithne Browne, Jamie Clarke, Michael Fletcher, Stephen Fletcher, Lindzi Germain, Cath Rice, Andrew Schofield, Hayley Sheen, Joe Speare, Michael Starke, Keddy Sutton and Liam Tobin	Written and Directed by Stephen Fletcher and Howard Gray. Designed by Olivia Du Monceau.
2021			
Ellen and Rigby	2 July to 31 July	Andrew Schofield, Lindzi Germain	Written by Nicky Gerry Linford. Directed by Stephen Fletcher. Designed by Alfie Heywood.
Boisterous Bouncers	13 August to 11 September	Joe Speare, Zain Salim, Michael Horsley and Mutty Burman	Written by John Godber. Adapted by Maurice Bessman. Directed by Miriam Mussa.
Homebaked The Musical	29 September to 23 October	Pauline Daniels, Eithne Browne, George Caple, George Jones, Howard Gray, Liam Tobin, Paul Broughton, Steph Lacey	Written by Boff Whalley. Directed by Rod Dixon. Designed by Olivia Du Monceau.
The Scouse Sleeping Beauty	5 November to 29 January	Emma Grace Arends, Emma Bispham, Jamie Clarke, Michael Fletcher, Liam Tobin, Lindzi Germain, Hayley Sheen, Andrew Schofield, Keddy Sutton.	Written by Kevin Fearon. Directed by Stephen Fletcher. Designed by Olivia Du Monceau.
2022			
The Royal	11 March to 16 April	Lynn Francis, Lindzi Germain, Alan Stocks, Danny O’Brien, Angela Simms, Joe Matthew-Morris	Written by Lindzi Germain and Angela Simms with additional material by Cal McCrystal. Directed by Cal McCrystal.
Macca and Beth	29 April to 28 May	Danny O’Brien, Emma Bispham, Gordon Kane, Andrea Miller, Jerome Ngonadi, Jamie Smelt, Karen Young	Written by Gerry Linford. Directed by Paul Goetzee. Designed by Olivia Du Monceau.
Mam! I'm 'Ere!	10 June to 16 July	Kacey Ainstworth, Hayley Sheen, Michael Fletcher, Lynn Francis, Lindzi Germain, Mia Molloy, Andrew Schofield, Liam Tobin, Alan Stocks, Natasha Gooden, Shannon McFadden, Molly Cranmer.	Written and Directed by Stephen Fletcher. Designed by Mark Walters.
YNWA - Let's Talk About Six... Baby!	29 July to 3 September	Jake Abraham, Lindzi Germain, Ben Gladwin, Adam Keast, Mark Moraghan, Daniel Ross, Lenny Wood, Matt Connor, Lydia Morales-Scully, Spencer Butts.	Written by Nicky Allt. Directed by Howard Gray. Designed by Mark Walters.
The Scousetrap	23 September to 29 October	David Benson, Eithne Browne, Helen Carter, Gabriel Fleary, Jack Lane, Zain Salim, Keddy Sutton, Liam Tobin.	Written by Kevin Fearon and Cal McCrystal . Directed by Cal McCrystal. Designed by takis.
The Scouse Jack and The Beanstalk	11 November to 28 January	Emma Grace Arends, Emma Bispham, Jake Abraham, Michael Fletcher, Liam Tobin, Lindzi Germain, Hayley Sheen, Andrew Schofield, Keddy Sutton.	Written by Kevin Fearon. Directed by Stephen Fletcher. Designed by Olivia Du Monceau.
2023			
Two Of Us	10 February to 25 February	Tom Connor, Mark Newnham, Ben Gladwin, Greg Joy, Adam Keast, Mike Woodvine.	Written by Mark McGann Bob Eaton. Directed by Bob Eaton and Howard Gray. Designed by Christopher McCourt.
Bingo Star	10 March to 8 April	Helen Carter, Paul Duckworth, Paige Fenlon, Jonathan Markwood, Alan Stocks and Keddy Sutton.	Written by Iain Christie. Directed by Emma Bird. Designed by Olivia Du Monceau.
A Thong For Europe	21 April to 27 May	Emma Bispham, Eithne Browne, Andro Cowperthwaite, Gemma Dobson, Lindzi Germain, Keddy Sutton, Kathy Bancroft and Adam Scotland.	Written by Johnathan Harvey. Directed by Stephen Fletcher. Designed by Jocelyn Meall.
Vernons Girls	9 June to 8 July	Jamie Clarke, Jessica Dives, Tasha Dowd, Caitlin Lavagna, Rebecca Levy, Abigail Middleton, Lydia Morales Scully. Emma Jane Morton, Izzy Neish, Siobhan O'Driscoll and Lynwen Haf Roberts.	Written by Karen Brown. Directed by Bob Eaton. Designed by Alfie Heywood.
A Greasy Spoon	28 July to 26 August	Lindzi Germain, Anthony Gough, Jay Johnson, Adam McCoy, Ben Philips and Hayley Sheen.	Written by Alice Bunker-Whitney. Directed by Francesca Goodridge. Designed by Alfie Heywood.
Boys from the Blackstuff	15 September to 28 October	George Caple, Dominic Carter, Helen Carter, Aron Julius, Oliver Mawdsley, Nathan McMullen, Lauren O'Neil, Andrew Schofield, Barry Sloane and Mark Womack.	Written by Alan Bleasdale and James Graham. Directed by Kate Wasserberg. Designed by Amy Jane Cook.
The Scouse Dick Whittington	10 November to 27 January	Emma-Grace Arends, Emma Bispham, Jamie Clarke, Paige Fenlon, Lindzi Germain, Adam McCoy, Andrew Schofield, Hayley Sheen, Keddy Sutton and Liam Tobin.	Written by Kevin Fearon. Directed by Mark Chatterton. Designed by Olivia Du Monceau.
2024			
Haunted Scouse	9 February to 9 March	Helen Carter, Paul Duckworth, Lynn Francis, Julie Glover and Michael Starke.	Written by Gerry Linford. Directed by Emma Bird. Designed by Ellie Light.
Come Together	15 March to 13 April	Tom Connor, Mark Newnham, Ben Gladwin, Greg Joy, Adam Keast and Mike Woodvine.	Written by Tom Connor and Mark Newnham. Directed Bob Eaton. Designed by Christopher McCourt.
Boys From The Blackstuff	19 April to 11 May	George Caple, Dominic Carter, Helen Carter, Aron Julius, Nathan McMullen, Lauren O'Neil, Jamie Peacock, Barry Sloane, Philip Whitchurch and Mark Womack. Kieran Foster, Liam Powell-Berry, Hayley Sheen and Liam Tobin	Written by Alan Bleasdale and James Graham. Directed Kate Wasserberg. Designed by Amy Jane Cook.
The Netherley Hillbillies	24 May to 22 June	Reiss Barber, Paul Duckworth, Charlie De'Ath, Vicky Entwistle, Lynn Francis, Jasmine Herrington and Sarah White.	Written by Barbara Phillips. Directed Deborah Yhip. Designed by Alfie Heywood.
Sisters Of Mersey	5 July to 3 August	Emma Bispham, Natalie Blair, Gabriel Fleary, Lindzi Germain, Keddy Sutton and Keshia Santos.	Written by Jonathan Harvey. Directed Stephen Fletcher. Designed by Liverpool's Royal Court.
Lost Soul 2	16 August to 14 September	Paul Duckworth, Lindzi Germain, Michael Hawkins, Jennifer Hynes, Cath Rice, Andrew Schofield and Lenny Wood.	Written by Dave Kirby. Directed Bob Eaton. Designed by Jocelyn Meall.
Girls Don't Play Guitars	27 September to 26 October	Molly-Grace Cutler, Alice McKenna, Lisa Wright, Sarah Workman, Tom Connor, Guy Freeman, Max Guest, Jonathan Markwood, Mark Newnham and Charlie West.	Written by Ian Salmon. Directed Bob Eaton. Designed by Mark Walters.
The Scouse Red Riding Hood	8 November to 25 January	Emma-Grace Arends, Chantel Cole, Lindzi Germain, Adam McCoy, Lydia Rosa Morales Scully, Andrew Schofield, Keddy Sutton and Liam Tobin.	Written by Kevin Fearon. Directed by Mark Chatterton. Designed by Ellie Light.
2025			
The Peaceful Hour	14 February to 8 March	Ellie Clayton, Julie Glover, Michael Hawkins, Angela Simms, Jack Whittle and Lenny Wood.	Written by Gerry Linford. Directed Emma Bird. Designed by Chris McCourt.
David Peace's Red Or Dead	21 March to 19 April	Les Dennis, Matthew Devlin, Paul Duckworth, Keith Fleming, George Jones, Gordon Kennedy, Oliver Mawdsley, Allison McKenzie, Peter Mullan, Liam Powell-Berry, Dickon Tyrrell and Jhanaica Van Mook.	Written by Phillip Breen. Directed by Phillip Breen. Designed by Max Jones.
Making It	1 May to 17 May	Catherine Rice and Andrew Schofield.	Written by Catherine Rice and Stephen Fletcher with additional material from Andrew Schofield. Directed by Stephen Fletcher. Designed by Katie Scott.
Speedo Mick	30 May to 5 July	Paul Duckworth, Jessica Dyas, Maddie Hansen, Ewan Ling, Iris Laverne, Polly Lister, Oliver Mawdsley, Timothy Roberts, Steve Simmonds, Declan Wilson and Lenny Wood.	Written by John Fay. Directed by Conrad Nelson. Designed by Ellie Light.
The Legend Of Rooney's Ring	18 July to 23 August	Emma-Grace Arends, Lindzi Germain, John May, Adam McCoy, Terry Mynott, Jess Smith, Keddy Sutton and Liam Tobin.	Written by Helen Serafinowicz. Directed by Stephen Fletcher. Designed by Olivia Du Monceau.

== Studio ==
In 2017, the theatre's basement level was converted into a performance space, tailored to smaller scale theatre, music and comedy events. This was supported by Arts Council England, as part of the third stage of the theatre's refurbishment and work was completed in January 2018.

The art deco style space seats around 150 people and has been home to both inhouse shows and numerous visiting companies.

Comedy events have included the return of the Rawhide Comedy Club, It's a Scream Comedy Club, the Alternative Black Cabaret Showcase (Boisterous Theatre Company) and various solo stand-up comedians. Dane Baptiste, Pauline Daniels, Pete Price and Paul Sinha have been among the most notable performers.

The theatre began producing inhouse stage plays for the Studio, starting with 2018's The Rainbow Connection. Several subsequent productions have been written by students of their Stage Write Playwright Development Programme, which aims to aide new, local playwrights in developing their craft. The Studio also regularly hosts Stage Write Nights, script-in-hand readings of extracts from new works. Some of these plays showcased have gone onto be performed in the Studio and even on the main stage. See below for a full list of Studio shows.

Show Title	Dates	Cast	Creatives
2018			
The Rainbow Connection	3 April to 12 April	Danny O’Brien, Angela Simms.	Written by Joanne Sherryden. Directed by Paul Goetzee. Directed by Paul Goetzee. Designed by Sophie Bailey, Kate Harvey.
2019			
Masquerade	24 July to 10 August	Roy Brandon, Eithne Brown, Julie Glover, Adam McCoy, Jamie Peacock, Daniel Waterhouse.	Written by Laura Lees. Directed by Paul Goetzee. Designed by Christine Hatton.
Pig	4 September to 14 September	Abigail Middleton, Karen Young.	Written by Sarah Power. Directed by Olive Pascha. Designed by Ellie Light.
Knee Deep in Promises	2 October to 19 October	Lewis Bray, Debbie Brannan, Sharon Byatt.	Written by Deborah Morgan. Directed by Paul Goetzee. Designed by Christine Hatton
Merry Christmas, Carol	9 December to 29 December	Eithne Brown, Helen Carter, Jessica Dives, Rachel Hilton, Molly Madigan, Paislie Reed, Angela Simms.	Written by Helen Carter. Directed by Joe Shipman. Designed by Christine Hatton.
2022			
Hey Bunny, Get Loose!	11 May to 28 May	Sinead Cullen-Barrett, Keiran Foster, Julie Glover, Shaun Mason, Debra Radclifee, Angela Simms.	Written by Wendy Dickinson. Directed by Emma Bird. Designed by Christopher McCourt.
Offered Up	22 June to 9 July	Helen Carter, Katy Metheringham, Harvey Robinson, Ben Tiramani.	Written by Joe Matthew-Morris. Directed by Paul Goetzee. Designed by Alfie Heywood
Stocking Fillers	14 December to 30 December	Paul Duckworth, Helen Carter, Sinead Renaye, Joe Shipman.	Written by Rachel Hunter, Wallace Charles, Harvey Robinson, EJ Fisher, Rachel Clark, Jacqui Dunne, Liz Redwood. Directed by Emma Bird. Designed by Jen Baron.
2023			
Cosmic	22 March to 8 April	Clare Hackett, Connor Henry, Andy McLeod, Mark Rice-Oxley and Kalli Tant.	Written by Joe McNally. Directed by Deborah Yhip. Designed by Christopher McCourt.
Stocking Fillers	7 December to 30 December	Charity Bedo-Addo, Charlie De'Ath, Jamie Peacock, Angela Simms.	Written by Jacqui Dunne, Liam Gillies, Janine Hammond, Michael Hartless, Ste Mc, Stewart McDonald and David Sindall. Directed by Nicole Behan. Designed by Jen Baron.
2024			
The Independent Socialist Republic Of The Upper End Of The Lower Breck Road	2 May to 18 May	Lucy Bromilow, Kathleen Collins, Graham Elwell, Princess Khumalo Recorded performances by: Roy Carruthers, Adam Keast.	Written by Laurence Quilty. Directed by Dan Jones. Designed by Christopher McCourt.
Stocking Fillers	13 December to 29 December	Tasha Dowd, Lynn Francis, Elliott Kingsley, Joe McGann.	Written by Alex Alexandre, Paul Ariss, Iain Christie, David Holmes, Ste McMarya McCann, Sarah Whitehead. Directed by Sam Donovan. Designed by Jen Baron.
2025			
Pass the Parcel	23 January to 8 February	Eithne Brown, Jessica May Buxton, Katie Erich, Hayley Sheen.	Written by Sarah Whitehead. Directed by Nicole Behan. Designed by Eleanor Ferguson.
Sauce and Sorcery	1 August to 23 August	Carl Cockram, Michael Hawkins, Daniel Owen, Roman Ryan.	Written by Paddy Clarke. Directed by Joe Shipman. Designed by Charlotte Murhpy.
The Anfield Apocalypse	3 October to 18 October	Emma Bispham, Lynn Francis, Dylan Thomas Smith, Georgia Taft, Liam Tobin.	Written by Rachel Louise Clark. Directed by Sam Donovan. Designed by Jen Baron.
Stocking Fillers	4 December to 3 January	Carl Cockram, Joe Cowin, Julie Glover, Princess Khumalo	Written by Ed Barrett, Ed Connole, David Elliott, Nadine Jump, Sarah O'Hara, Liz Redwood, Sinead Taylor. Directed by Jessica Meade. Designed by Jen Baron.
