= Fred Lawless =

British playwright from Liverpool

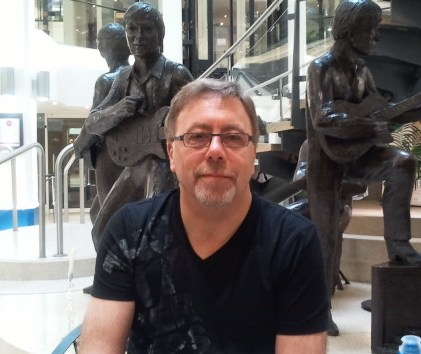
- Fred Lawless – Playwright
- Born: Dingle, Liverpool, England
- Education: St Patrick's School, Toxteth, Wade Deacon Grammar School, Widnes, Liverpool Catering College
- Occupations: Playwright, television writer, radio writer
- Known for: Writing for stage, television, and radio
- Notable work: EastEnders, Royal Court Theatre Liverpool Christmas shows

Fred Lawless is a British playwright from Liverpool who writes mainly for the stage, but also for television and radio.

== Biography ==
Fred Lawless was born in Dingle, Liverpool. He attended St Patrick's School in Toxteth before his family moved to Halewood. He later attended Wade Deacon Grammar School, Widnes.

After grammar school he attended Liverpool Catering College and trained as a hotel manager, eventually working in several Liverpool City Centre hotels. Several years later he gave up hotel management and ran a stall at the famous Paddy's Market in Liverpool. While working there he met Jonte Wilkins, and the two of them started the UK's first Greetings Telegram company, Champagne-a-gram, from an office in Aigburth. Shortly after Wilkins left for the US and eventually became the drummer for the British band a Flock of Seagulls.

Lawless continued to run the business for several years, eventually employing 30 staff. One of the staff he employed was Mal Young who worked for him as a Tarzan-a-gram. After leaving Champagne-a-gram Young entered the TV industry and eventually became producer of Liverpool-based soap opera Brookside. Many years later Young interviewed Lawless with a view to him joining the writing team at Brookside, but instead he chose to write for EastEnders. In addition to his TV work, he has also written for BBC Radio. Nowadays he works primarily in theatre and wrote the Christmas show at the Royal Court Theatre Liverpool from 2009 until 2016.

Lawless is a director of The Script Vault Ltd, a script registration service for writers who wish to protect their copyright.

He is a lifelong Everton supporter and season ticket holder.

== Previous work ==
=== Theatre ===
- BEST! – a fictional comedy musical about the Beatles and their first drummer Pete Best at Liverpool's Everyman Theatre and the Dublin Theatre Festival.
- Sleeping Cities, Distant Dreams – at the Royal Exchange Theatre module in Manchester.
- Educating Peter – at the Liverpool Playhouse Studio.
- Beyond Benidorm – at the Liverpool Playhouse Studio.
- Slappers and Slapheads – a comedy (co-written with Len Pentin) first performed in 2003 at the Royal Court Theatre, Liverpool. The play was staged again in 2004 at the Liverpool Empire Theatre and the Manchester Opera House, before returning again to the Royal Court Theatre, Liverpool in February 2009. Following the 2009 production the play won the Liverpool Daily Post Readers Award for Best Production and Best Comedy
- Merry Ding Dong – a comedy musical staged at the Royal Court Theatre, Liverpool from 11 December 2009 to 23 January 2010.
- A Fistful of Collars – a comedy staged at the Royal Court Theatre, Liverpool from 16 April 2010 to 15 May 2010.
- Scouse Pacific – a comedy musical staged at the Royal Court Theatre, Liverpool from 26 November 2010 to 8 January 2011. The show was extended until 15 January and then extended again until 22 January.
- Little Scouse on the Prairie – a comedy musical staged at the Royal Court Theatre, Liverpool from 25 November 2011 to 7 January 2012. The show was extended until 21 January.
- A Nightmare on Lime Street – a comedy musical staged at the Royal Court Theatre, Liverpool from 23 November 2012 to 12 January 2013. The show was extended until 26 January.
- The Hitchhiker's Guide to Fazakerley – a comedy musical staged at the Royal Court Theatre, Liverpool from 22 November 2013 to 11 January 2014.
- Scouse Of The Antarctic – a comedy musical staged at the Royal Court Theatre, Liverpool from 21 November 2014 to 17 January 2015.
- Pharaoh 'Cross The Mersey – a comedy musical staged at the Royal Court Theatre, Liverpool from 27 November 2015 to 16 January 2016.

=== Television ===
- EastEnders – BBC One
- Family Affairs – Channel 5
- Crossroads (2001) – Carlton Television

=== Radio ===
- Close Enough To Touch – a dramatisation of the 1939 HMS Thetis submarine disaster in Liverpool Bay for BBC Radio 4, BBC Radio Merseyside and the BBC World Service.
- Paradise People – a 24 part comedy series for BBC Radio Merseyside (co-written with Len Pentin)
