= Judith Barker =

English actress (born 1943)

- Born: 22 June 1943 (age 83); Oldham, Lancashire, England
- Occupation: Actress
- Years active: 1964–present
- Television: Coronation Street; The Practice; Waterloo Road; Emmerdale
- Spouse: Kenneth Alan Taylor (m. 1964)

Judith Barker (born 22 June 1943) is an English actress, best known for her role as the upwardly mobile homewrecker Janet Reid in Coronation Street, which she played from 1969 to 1977.

Since her departure from Coronation Street, Barker has mostly been a character actress in television dramas, such as the 1984 Channel 4 series Scully, where she played the teacher Mrs Heath. An exception is her role as Audrey Manners in Brookside during 1995. She appeared in the first series of Waterloo Road as Estelle Cooper, and had a small role in the film Miss Potter. It was reported that she declined the premiere for the movie starring Renee Zellweger to teach drama at her local school, Saddleworth Drama Centre in Oldham. Since Judith’s departure from Coronation Street her husband, daughter-in-law and grandson have also appeared in the show.

Barker reappeared in Waterloo Road in series 10, playing a different character, Grace Drummond.

In 2012, she appeared in the second series of Scott & Bailey as Dorothy Parsons, the mother of Lesley Sharp's character DC Janet Scott. From 2019 to 2020, she appeared as Agatha Finn in Emmerdale. Barker also runs her own drama classes at Springhead Congregational Church, alongside choreographer & Agent, Adele Parry. Saddleworth Drama Centre. Recent achievements have seen her classes performing at the Oldham Coliseum Theatre.

== Filmography ==
Year	Title	Role	Notes
1965	Coronation Street	Babs	Minor role
1967	Turn Out the Lights	Ann Sankey	1 episode
1968	Crossroads	Constance Dory	5 episodes
1969, 1971, 1973–1975, 1977	Coronation Street	Janet Reid	Regular role; 71 episodes
1983–1984	Brookside	Eileen Salter	Minor role
1984	Scully	Mrs Heath	Main role; 5 episodes
1985–1986	The Practice	Pauline Kent	Series regular; 46 episodes
1995	Brookside	Audrey Manners	Main role
2003	Hollyoaks	Lillian Hunter	4 episodes
2006	Waterloo Road	Estelle Cooper	8 episodes
2006	Miss Potter	Hilda	Film
2010	Shameless	Florence	1 episode
2012–2016	Scott & Bailey	Dorothy Parsons	Recurring role; 19 episodes
2014	Birds of a Feather	Sadie	1 episode
2014	Waterloo Road	Grace Drummond	4 episodes
2016	Rovers	Francis	All 6 episodes
2017	Peter Kay's Car Share	Lady on Bus	1 episode
2019–2020	Emmerdale	Agatha Finn	Recurring role; 16 episodes
2019	Warren	Sheila	3 episodes
2022	Documentary Now!		Episode: Two Hairdressers in Bagglyport
2023-2025	The Power of Parker	Betty	6 episodes
