= Slappers and Slapheads =

Slappers and Slapheads is a comedy stage play written by Merseyside writers Fred Lawless and Len Pentin. It was first performed in 2003 at the Royal Court Theatre, Liverpool, returning the following year to the Liverpool Empire Theatre and Manchester Opera House.

== Plot ==
The play is set in a fictional Liverpool nightclub called The Palace. (It has been suggested that The Palace is based on The Grafton Ballroom, a famous Liverpool nightclub which closed in 2008.) Each of the various characters in the play appears to have come to the Palace for a night of fun and to 'cop off' with someone of the opposite sex, but as the various plots unfold we discover that they are in fact all there for very different reasons. As each character pursues their quest the play moves up a gear, bringing about a fast-paced second act in which comedy interweaves with some sad moments.

== Original cast ==
The original cast were:

- Paul Duckworth as Chris
- Gillian Hardie as Donna
- Gina Lamb as Elaine
- Linzi Matthews as Sue
- Mike Neary as Billy
- Liam Tobin as Gary/Barry
- Pete Price as Pete Price

== Other performances ==
The play was staged again at the Royal Court Theatre, Liverpool from Friday 6 February to Saturday 7 March 2009 with the following cast:

- Helen Carter as Sue
- Warren Donnelly as Chris
- Gillian Hardie as Donna
- Mike Neary as Billy
- Alan Stocks as Gary/Barry
- Keddy Sutton as Elaine
- Pete Price as Pete Price

The director was Bob Eaton and the producer was Kevin Fearon.

== Reviews ==
The Liverpool Daily Post review, July 2003:

'With a title like this you could be forgiven for expecting a night of crude humour and sexist jibes. Instead we were treated to one of the best nights of home-grown comedy theatre to be enjoyed in a long time. Filled with laughter, pathos and consistently excellent performances Slappers and Slapheads was a real triumph. Penned by Liverpool duo Len Pentin and Fred Lawless, the action was set in The Palace, a city club with more than a passing resemblance to the infamous Grafton in West Derby. Pete Price made an early appearance as the club DJ adding his own brand of humour to get the audience in the mood and add an extra layer of realism as he introduced some disco classics. The cast of Gillian Hardie, Gina Lamb, Linzi Matthews, Liam Tobin, Michael Neary and Paul Duckworth were outstanding throughout, skilfully combining raucous slapstick with moving drama. The first half was packed to the rafters with visual and verbal gags but, after the interval, the mood turned, as drunken nights out in clubs often do. Despite the more serious topics of birth and death, Pentin and Lawless managed to keep the laughter coming and more than one audience member alternatively wiped away tears of mirth and sadness. It was a little tricky to work out when the ending was coming as a series of short vignettes finished the play with each character resolving their problems before heading into the night. But when the finale finally came, many of the audience rose to their feet to deliver a well-deserved standing ovation. They may have been slappers and slapheads but they proved to be the perfect companions for another great night at the Liverpool Comedy Festival.'

The Liverpool Daily Post review, February 2009:

'SLAPPERS and Slapheads began life at the Royal Court in 2003, and returns whipped into shape to launch the theatre's 2009 programme. And what a belter it is. Based on a night at the city's infamous Grafton nightclub – which becomes the Palace, with off-stage DJ Pete Price warming up the audiences himself until the 18th – there's more to it than you might imagine from the title. Everything is helped, of course, by some hugely enjoyable performances that really do justice to the notably tight writing of Fred Lawless and Len Pentin. And it's pleasing to say that it's the female roles that prove to be the most memorable. Gillian Hardie, as bolshie Elaine, leads the charge. In the wrong hands, the character could be some cloying tart-with-a-heart, but, as the saucy leader of the girls and no-nonsense judge of the boys, she shines. Helen Carter, who impressed last year with her supporting role in Once Upon a Time at the Adelphi, is understated this time as heavily pregnant Sue, desperately seeking the one night stand that resulted in her condition. And Gillian Hardie's straight-laced Elaine should not be able to get away with some of the filth she eventually finds herself turned on to, but produces a comic turn surely worthy of Royal Court legend. It's crude and lewd, but so very well written and enthusiastically performed that it works well. With some great lines, great actors and great tunes, this “Scouse play”, perhaps more than any other definitely shows the potential to travel further afield.'

Following the 2009 production the play won the Liverpool Daily Post Readers Award for Best Production and Best Comedy
