= Nicky Allt =

English playwright (born 1965)

- Born: 12 December 1965 (age 60); Liverpool, Merseyside, England
- Occupations: Playwright, author, filmmaker

Nicky Allt (born 12 December 1965, Liverpool, Merseyside, England) is an English playwright, author and filmmaker.

== Early life ==
Allt is the eldest child from a family of five. His father Christopher worked as a union shop steward in a number of factories, and his mother Rose as a union rep dinner lady. After being slum-cleared from Liverpool city centre to Kirkby in 1970, from 1970-1977, he went to St. Mary's Roman Catholic Infant and Junior Schools in Kirkby. From 1977 onward, he attended St Kevin's Comprehensive in Kirkby till 1982 (which became All Saints Catholic High School, Kirkby). He has lived a nomadic lifestyle, emigrating to South Africa and America, and living and working at various building trades in London, Jersey, Bournemouth, Germany and Spain, as well as other numerous cities around the globe.

== Career ==
His first success came as the writer of The Boys from the Mersey, a bestselling book about his travels while following Liverpool Football Club. His next book, Here We Go Gathering Cups in May was written with six other authors about Liverpool FC's seven European Cup Final appearances.

Allt's first play, "Brick Up the Mersey Tunnels", co-written, became a huge local hit at Liverpool's Royal Court Theatre. The play, which was about a comedic rivalry between The Wirral and Liverpool, ends in the surreal blockading of the Mersey Tunnels, to stop the 'posh Wirraliens' from getting through to take up Liverpool jobs, was eventually watched by over 180,000 people. In Liverpool Theatre folklore, it was stated that it saved the historic Royal Court Theatre from closing. The play went on to complete four sell-out runs at the Theatre.

Allt's next venture into theatre was to write and produce the hit show, "One Night in Istanbul", which became The Empire Theatre's fastest selling show, after being watched by 25,000 people in a short run in the spring of 2009. The show had repeated success at The Liverpool Empire, and at the brand new Grand Canal Theatre in Dublin's docklands. It was made into a movie.

Allt's first Independent feature film "One Night in Istanbul" starring Sam Janus, Paul Barber and Steve Waddington was released in 2014, along with a comedy play "A Tale of Two Chippy's" about two warring North West fish and chip shops, and a movie about ex Prime Minister Mrs Margaret Thatcher.

Allt lives in Liverpool with his wife and three children and has written and produced an official show about the history of Liverpool Football Club called You'll Never Walk Alone that received rave reviews, and is in the process of writing a movie about New York and Ireland.

He is also the author of huge hit show "Celtic the Musical" which sold out at Glasgow's Pavilion Theatre in 2016 and 2018 and will play The Armadillo in September 2022.

You'll Never Walk Alone received an excellent reception and reviews in Liverpool Echo, Daily Post, Liverpool Confidential, Liverpool Student Media and The Public Reviews.

Brick Up the Mersey Tunnels, Celtic the Musical, You'll Never Walk Alone, One Night in Istanbul, Lost in Colomendy, The Sunderland Story and Two Cities (Half a World Away) have all proven very popular with audiences and Allt has now been commissioned to write a new movie and show to be announced in 2026.

== Works ==
=== Plays ===
- Brick Up the Mersey Tunnels, Royal Court Theatre, Liverpool, England, 2006-2016
- One Night in Istanbul, Empire Theatre, Liverpool, England, 9 July 2009
- You'll Never Walk Alone – The History of Liverpool F.C., Royal Court, Liverpool 2011, 2014, 2017
- A Tale of Two Chippy's, Royal Court 2014.
- Celtic the Musical 2016
- Celebrate 67 Hydro 2017
- Brick Up 2. The Wrath of Ann Twacky
- Lost in Colomendy Royal Court 2020
- The Sunderland Story Sunderland Empire 2023
- Two Cities, Half the World Away Royal Theatre 2023
- https://www.culturednortheast.co.uk/2023/05/19/review-the-sunderland-story-at-sunderland-empire/
- https://northwestend.com/ynwa-lets-talk-about-sixbaby-royal-court-liverpool/
- https://innewcastle.co.uk/review-the-sunderland-story-at-sunderland-empire/
- https://www.themysterymagazine.co.uk/review-lost-in-colomendy/
- https://hairyphotographer.co.uk/lost-in-colomendy-review/
- https://www.liverpoolsoundandvision.co.uk/2020/02/06/lost-in-colomendy-theatre-review-royal-court-theatre-liverpool/
- https://www.sthelenstheatreroyal.com/show/873648215/

=== Films ===
- One Night in Istanbul, starring Paul Barber, Samantha Janus, Steve Waddington, released in September 2014 to critical acclaim. Allt's next movie is underway as is his next play, both written for Ireland.

=== Bibliography ===
- The Boys from the Mersey. Milo Books. 2005. ISBN 978-1-903854-39-6.
- The Culture of Capital. Liverpool University Press. 2008. ISBN 978-1-84631-127-7.http://www.press.uchicago.edu/presssite/metadata.epl?mode=synopsis&bookkey=6305087
- Here We Go Gathering Cups in May. Canongate Books. 2009. ISBN 978-1-84767-167-7.
- Klepto. Bang On Top Productions. 2009. ISBN 978-0-9564267-0-3.
- A Smashing Little Football Firm. Pitch Publishing (Brighton) Limited. 2010. ISBN 978-1-84818-407-7.
- Gold Fever Awaydays. 2021. ISBN 978-0954757731.
