= Andrew Schofield (actor) =

British actor (born 1958)

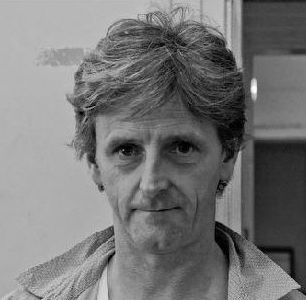
- Andrew Schofield in August 2007
- Born: Andrew Schofield; 12 October 1958 (age 67); Kirkby, Lancashire, England
- Other name: Drew Schofield
- Occupations: Actor, Musician
- Years active: 1974–present
- Spouse: Angela Schofield
- Children: 3, including Bobby Schofield
- Parent(s): Joseph Schofield, Josephine Schofield
- Awards: 2008 Scouseology Award for Theatre
- Website: http://www.drewschofield.com

Andrew Schofield (born 12 October 1958) is an English actor best known for starring as the Narrator in Willy Russell's original production of the musical Blood Brothers in 1983, and playing Johnny Rotten in Alex Cox's 1986 film Sid and Nancy.

== Early life ==
Born in Kirkby, Lancashire to Joseph and Josephine Schofield, Andrew Schofield attended St Kevin's Roman Catholic Comprehensive School. At 15 he was cast in Willy Russell's first Play for Today, Death of a Young, Young Man.

== Stage ==
Schofield's stage credits include starring as the Narrator in Willy Russell's original production of Blood Brothers in 1983 at the Liverpool Playhouse and in the subsequent transfer to the Lyric Theatre in London's West End. He also appeared as George in Of Mice and Men at the Old Vic, London in 2004.

Schofield's subsequent credits include: all four runs of Brick Up the Mersey Tunnels as Dickie Lewis; Smigger in Lost Soul in 2007, 2008 and 2017; Brian in Good Golly Miss Molly; Moey in the Alan Bleasdale comedy On the Ledge; Paul Sheldon in Misery; the Traveller in Eight Miles High; Danny in Council Depot Blues; John Lennon in Bob Eaton's Lennon (2010); Joe in Night Collar; JJ in The Flags and Mr Briggs in Our Day Out - The Musical. He performed all of these roles at the Royal Court Theatre, Liverpool.

He won the 2008 Scouseology Award for Theatre on 25 April 2008. Schofield played guitar in the pit band for Merry Ding Dong at Liverpool's Royal Court Theatre until 23 January 2010. He appeared in Scouse Pacific, a new comedy musical written by Fred Lawless at the Royal Court Theatre from 2010 to 2011.

Schofield also appeared as McKenna in Alan Bleasdale's Down the Dock Road at the Royal Court Theatre in Liverpool.

== Film ==
Schofield's best known film role is that of Johnny Rotten in Alex Cox's 1986 film Sid and Nancy. He appeared as Les in Terence Davies' Distant Voices, Still Lives, made a small cameo as a hotel receptionist in Three Businessmen, appears briefly in Hamlet and played Carlo in Revengers Tragedy. He has also recently made an independent short film called Leave Taking, and appeared in the Liverpool-based feature Under the Mud.

Schofield appeared in a short film called Fifteen Minutes That Shook The World, released in autumn 2010, written by Dave Kirby about Liverpool F.C.'s comeback in the Champions League final in 2005.

== TV ==
Schofield's biggest TV role was as Francis (Franny) Scully in Alan Bleasdale's 1984 Granada series Scully. He has also appeared in several other Bleasdale series, as Peter Grenville in GBH in 1991, Jake's Progress in 1995 and as Charlton Ffoulkes in Melissa in 1997, as well as a minor role as a policeman in the Boys from the Blackstuff episode "Yosser's Story". He played Toby Crackitt in the 1999 TV Series Oliver Twist. Other TV credits include Coronation Street in 1979 as one of Suzie Birchall's friends, Maisie Raine with Pauline Quirke, Sharpe with Sean Bean and Murphy's Law with James Nesbitt.

== Recordings ==
Schofield can be heard on the original cast recording of Blood Brothers and also as a featured vocalist on the Barbara Dickson album The 7 Ages of Woman.
