= Brick Up the Mersey Tunnels =

- Written by: Nicky Allt, Dave Kirby
- Setting: Liverpool

Premiere
- Date premiered: August 3, 2006
- Place premiered: Royal Court Theatre, Liverpool

Brick Up the Mersey Tunnels is a play about the story of the Kingsway Three, a fictitious terrorist organisation, and their plans to brick up the Tunnels which join Liverpool to the Wirral. It was written by Nicky Allt and Dave Kirby and performed at the Royal Court Theatre, Liverpool from 3 to 26 August 2006.

== Cast ==
- Dennis Twacky - Roy Brandon
- Ann Twacky - Eithne Browne
- Nick Walton - Carl Chase
- Maggie - Suzanne Collins
- Gerard Gardener - David Edge
- Elliott Neston - Adam Keast
- Dickie Lewis/Dee Estuary - Andrew Schofield
- Miss Liz Card - Francis Tucker

== Production team ==
- Director - Bob Eaton
- Production Manager - Jasper Gilbert
- Set Design - Billy Meall
- Lighting designer - Rob Beamer
- Sound Design - Charlie Brown
- Musical Director - Howard Gray
- Producer - Kevin Fearon
- Technical Manager - Dave Hughes
- Lighting Operator - Andrew Patterson
- Sound Operator - Colyn D Lewin
- DSM - Nicola Donithorn
- ASM - Lee Anne Bannerman
- Stage Crew & Flys - Mark Goodall
- Stage Crew - Ben Cowper
- Costume Supervisor - Marie Jones

== Re-Run ==
Brick Up The Mersey Tunnels returned to the Royal Court from Friday 13 July 2007 until Saturday 25 August 2007. All of the cast and much of the crew were the same as the first run.

The show returned for a third time at the Royal Court from 14 March to 12 April 2008, with the same cast. A new Brick up show "The Wrath of Anne Twacky was performed at The Royal Court in 2018 with virtually the same cast. It is the follow-up to the original.
