= Scully (TV series) =

1984 British television drama series

- Created by: Alan Bleasdale
- Starring: Andrew Schofield; Ray Kingsley; Mark McGann; Richard Burke; Cathy Tyson; Jean Boht; Tom Georgeson; Judith Barker; Sam Kelly; Elvis Costello; Gary Bleasdale; Gilly Coman; Tony Haygarth; David Ross
- Country of origin: United Kingdom
- Original language: English
- No. of series: 1
- No. of episodes: 7

Production
- Running time: 30 minutes x 6; 60 minutes x 1

Original release
- Network: Channel 4
- Release: 14 May – 25 June 1984

Scully is a British television drama with some comedy elements set in Liverpool, England, that originated from a BBC Play for Today episode "Scully's New Year's Eve" (3 January 1978). Originally broadcast on Channel 4 in 1984, the single series was spread over six half-hour episodes plus a one-hour final episode. It was written by playwright Alan Bleasdale. The drama is notable for featuring many of the Liverpool football club first-team squad of that era.

== Plot ==
Francis Scully (played by Andrew Schofield) is a teenage boy who has his heart set on gaining a trial match for Liverpool to hopefully fulfil his ambition of playing for the club. Francis, in everyday situations during his waking hours, occasionally "sees" famous Liverpool players such as Kenny Dalglish when they are not really there. These dream-like sequences recur throughout the episodes.

The main plotline concerns the efforts of Scully's school teachers to persuade Scully to appear in the school pantomime which they attempt by promising him a trial with his beloved Liverpool if he will cooperate. When Scully and his friends are not in school making trouble for the teachers and the school caretaker, they are seen roaming the local streets upsetting the neighbours and getting into trouble with the police. Scully sometimes has visions of the school caretaker appearing as a vampire due to the caretaker's nickname being Dracula. These frequent waking dream sequences give the show a somewhat surreal atmosphere.

English musician and songwriter Elvis Costello played Scully's brother. Costello also wrote and performed the show's theme song "Turning The Town Red".

The complete series was released on DVD in 2006 as a two-disc set from Network DVD.

== Locations ==
The estate parts were filmed in Longsight, Manchester, on the 'Anson Road' Estate. Also some scenes were filmed in Leaton Avenue, Wythenshawe m22 Manchester.

Scully's house is situated on Bluebell Lane in Huyton, Knowsley, Several parts were also filmed on roads off Princess Drive, Dovecot.

The school building featured is the 'Central High School for Boys' (demolished) on Pink Bank Lane, which is off Kirkmanshulme Lane in the Belle Vue/Gorton area of Manchester. The extras used in the school/classroom scenes were pupils of the school.
