= Len Pentin =

Comedy and drama writer

Len Pentin is a comedy and drama writer based in Southport, Merseyside, England.

== Work ==
His work includes the two-hander All The Best (first performed in 2007 as Fun Like Stalingrad). He is also the co-writer of the popular "Liverpool Nightclub"-based play Slappers and Slapheads.

He was also a writer on BBC Radio Merseyside's Paradise People, a 24-episode radio sitcom series based around a fictional greasy spoon cafe on Paradise Street, Liverpool, the former home of Radio Merseyside itself. The series starred Radio Merseyside presenters Pauline Daniels and Roger Phillips. Other regulars included Lisa Millet and Mike Neary.

He is the writer of Cork Jackets and Drill, a story told through narration with original music, which tells the tale of the 1886 Southport lifeboat disaster. This was first performed in April 2014.
