= Kerber discography =

Band discography

- Kerber in 2011
- Studio albums: 6
- Live albums: 3
- Compilation albums: 5
- Singles: 2
- Video albums: 1

This is the discography of Serbian and Yugoslav rock band Kerber. This discography consists of 6 studio albums, 3 live album, 5 compilation albums, two singles and one video album. This list does not include solo material or side projects performed by the members.

== Studio albums ==
Year	Album details
1983	Nebo je malo za sve: Released: 1983; Label: ZKP RTLJ; Format: LP, CS, CD
1985	Ratne igre: Released: March 1985; Label: ZKP RTLJ; Format: LP, CS, CD
1986	Seobe: Released: 1986; Label: PGP-RTB; Format: LP, CS, CD
1988	Ljudi i bogovi: Released: 1988; Label: PGP-RTB; Format: LP, CS, CD
1990	Peta strana sveta: Released: 1990; Label: PGP-RTB; Format: LP, CS, CD
1996	Zapis: Released: 1996; Label: PGP-RTS; Format: LP, CS, CD

== Live albums ==
Year	Album details
1983	121288 Uživo: Released: 1989; Label: PGP-RTB; Format: LP, CS
1998	Unplugged: Released: 1998; Label: Take It Or Leave It Records; Format: CS, CD
2018	Unplugged Live Sava Centar: Released: 2018; Label: PGP-RTS; Format: CD; Note: Part of the box set Unplugged Live Sava Centar

== Compilation albums ==
Year	Album details
1998	Antologija 1983–1998 I: Released: 1998; Label: Raglas Records; Format: CS, CD
1998	Antologija 1983–1998 II: Released: 1998; Label: Raglas Records; Format: CS, CD
2008	Svet se brzo okreće – The Best of: Released: 2008; Label: PGP-RTS; Format: CD
2009	Sabrana dela: Released: 2009; Label: PGP-RTS; Format: CD; Note: Box set
2017	Specijal: Released: 2017; Label: PGP-RTS; Format: CD

== Singles ==
Year	Single details
2009	"Sveti Nikola": Released: 2009; Label: PGP-RTS; Format: CD; Note: Part of the box set Sabrana dela
2021	"Bestraga sve": Released: 2021; Label: Self-released; Format: MP3

== Video albums ==
Year	Album details
2018	Unplugged Live Sava Centar: Released: 2018; Label: PGP-RTS; Format: DVD; Note: Part of the box set Unplugged Live Sava Centar
