= Sabrana dela =

Box set by Kerber
- Released: 2009
- Recorded: 1983–1998
- Genre: Hard rock; heavy metal; arena rock
- Length: 4:05:03
- Label: PGP-RTS
- Producer: Various

Kerber chronology
Antologija 1983–1998 II (1998)	Sabrana dela (2009)	Unplugged Live Sava Centar (2018)

Sabrana dela (transl. Collected works) is a 7-piece box set from the Serbian and Yugoslav hard rock band Kerber, released in 2009. Sabrana dela features remastered versions of all six studio albums released by the band, and the previously unreleased track "Sveti Nikola" on the seventh disc.

== Track listing ==
=== Nebo je malo za sve ===
All tracks are written by Kerber.

No.	Title	Length
1.	"Mezimac" ("Minion")	3:35
2.	"Heroji od staniola" ("Tin Foil Heroes")	4:20
3.	"Sutrašnji dan" ("Tomorrow's Day")	5:50
4.	"Samo ti (Svemu si lek)" ("Only You (Heal Everything)")	3:50
5.	"Bele utvare" ("White Apparitions")	4:10
6.	"Nebo je malo za sve" ("The Sky Is Not Big Enough for All")	3:50
7.	"Kao tvoj Kerber" ("Like Your Cerberus")	3:15
8.	"Tvoja pesma" ("Your Song")	4:20

=== Ratne igre ===
All music is composed by Kerber.

No.	Title	Lyrics	Length
1.	"Ratne igre" ("War Games")	Kerber	3:36
2.	"Babaroga" ("Babaroga")	Duško Arsenijević	3:33
3.	"Mesečar" ("Sleepwalker")	Kerber	3:42
4.	"Zauvek slobodna" ("Forever Free")	Kerber	4:00
5.	"Dođi" ("Come")	Kerber	3:34
6.	"Hteo bih..." ("I Wish...")	Duško Arsenijević	3:29
7.	"Šta ostaje" ("What's Left")	Kerber; Jacques Prévert	3:57
8.	"Vreme za uspomene" ("Time for Memories")	Kerber	3:17
9.	"Get Me Out"	Gordon Rowley	4:10

=== Seobe ===
All music is composed by Kerber.

No.	Title	Lyrics	Length
1.	"Bolje da sam druge ljubio" ("I Should Have Kissed Other Girls")	Duško Arsenijević	3:42
2.	"Blagi bože, podigni me" ("Dear God, Lift Me Up")	Nikola Čuturilo	3:43
3.	"Kad ljubav izda" ("When Love Betrays")	Duško Arsenijević; Pero Zubac	4:15
4.	"Ne igram ruski rulet" ("I Don't Play Russian Roulette")	Duško Arsenijević	3:50
5.	"Još ovu noć mi daj" ("Give Me just This more Night")	Nikola Čuturilo	5:15
6.	"Hajde da se volimo" ("Let's Make Love")	Duško Arsenijević	3:35
7.	"Čovek od meda" ("Man Made of Honey")	Bora Đorđević	4:42
8.	"Sa tobom ne mogu dalje" ("I Can't Go On With You")	Bora Đorđević	4:42
9.	"Beli tragovi" ("White Traces")	Duško Arsenijević	3:15
10.	"Seobe" ("Migrations")	Duško Arsenijević	3:46

=== Ljudi i bogovi ===
All lyrics are written by Duško Arsenijević; all music is composed by Kerber.

No.	Title	Length
1.	"Svet se brzo okreće" ("The World Is Turning Fast")	4:12
2.	"Od srca daleko" ("Far Away from the Heart")	4:29
3.	"Na raskršću" ("At the Crossroads")	4:49
4.	"Laže šarene" ("Sweet Little Lies")	4:31
5.	"Bliznakinje" ("Twin Girls")	4:27
6.	"Između jave i sna" ("Between Reality and Dream")	4:03
7.	"Deda, pradeda" ("Grandfather, Great-Grandfather")	4:12
8.	"Kad prođe sve" ("When Everything's Over")	3:43
9.	"Manifest" ("Manifesto")	4:03

=== Peta strana sveta ===
No.	Title	Lyrics	Music	Length
1.	"Mama – Tata" ("Mom – Dad")	Duško Arsenijević	Keber	3:39
2.	"Ana"	Duško Arsenijević	Kerber	3:31
3.	"Sam" ("Alone")	Duško Arsenjević	Kerber	4:46
4.	"Otkad te ne volim" ("Since I've Stopped Loving You")	Duško Arsenijević	Kerber	4:41
5.	"Nema ničega iza oblaka" ("There's Nothing Beyond the Clouds")	Duško Arsenijević	Kerber	3:39
6.	"Igraj sad" ("Dance Now")	Duško Arsenijević	Kerber	4:38
7.	"Nažalost" ("Unfortunately")	Bora Đorđević	Kerber	3:35
8.	"Kod Amerikanca" ("At The American")	Bora Đorđević	Kerber	4:01
9.	"Ljubav je" ("Love Is")	Bora Đorđević; Duško Arsenijević	Dragoljub Ilić	4:42
10.	"Nikad ponovo" ("Never Again")	Duško Arsenijević	Kerber	3:45

=== Zapis ===
All lyrics are written by Duško Arsenijević; all music is composed by Kerber.

No.	Title	Length
1.	"Medena" ("Honey Girl")	4:30
2.	"Sanjam" ("I'm Dreaming")	4:15
3.	"Poslednja" ("The Last One")	4:30
4.	"Vodi me" ("Take Me")	6:50
5.	"Šta mogu pesme" ("What Songs Can Do")	4:30
6.	"Čudna stvar" ("Strange Thing")	4:50
7.	"Osvani" ("Stay until Dawn")	5:10
8.	"Abrakadabra" ("Abracadabra")	4:50
9.	"Luka"	4:20
10.	"Pronađi mesto" ("Find a Place")	6:00

=== Sveti Nikola ===
No.	Title	Lyrics	Music	Length
1.	"Sveti Nikola"	Dejan Perašević	Tomislav Nikolić	4:10

== Credits ==
- Goran Šepa - vocals
- Tomislav Nikolić - guitar
- Branislav Božinović - keyboard
- Zoran Žikić - bass guitar
- Zoran Stamenković - drums
- Dragoljub Đuričić - drums
- Branko Isaković - bass guitar
- Saša Vasković - bass guitar
- Josip Hartl - drums
- Vladan Stanojević - acoustic guitar
- Goran Đorđević - percussion
