= Bulevar discography =

- Studio albums: 2
- Compilation albums: 1
- Singles: 2
- Other appearances: 2

The discography of Bulevar, a Serbian new wave group from Belgrade, consists of two singles, two studio albums, the 1981 Loš i mlad (Bad and young) and 1982 Mala noćna panika (A little night panic), a compilation album, Nestašni dečaci (Wild boys), released in 2008, featuring the remastered versions of the two studio albums and the second single, as well as several appearances on various artists compilations.

== Studio albums ==
| Year | Album details |
|---|---|
| 1981 | Loš i mlad: Released: 1981; Label: PGP RTB; Format: LP, MC |
| 1982 | Mala noćna panika: Released: 1982; Label: PGP RTB; Format: LP, MC |

== Compilation albums ==
| Year | Album details |
|---|---|
| 2008 | Nestašni dečaci: Released: 2008; Label: PGP RTS; Format: CD |

== Singles ==
| Year | Single details |
|---|---|
| 1980 | "Moje bezvezne stvari": B-side: "Nemam ništa važno da te pitam"; From the album: Non-album single; Released: 1980; Label: PGP RTB; Format: 7" |
| 1980 | "Nestašni dečaci": B-side: "Moja lova, tvoja lova"; From the album: Non-album single; Released: 1980; Label: PGP RTB; Format: 7" |

== Other appearances ==
| Title | Album | Released |
|---|---|---|
| "Nestašni dečaci" | Svi marš na ples! | 1981 |
| "Unitarnja panika" | Pop-rok (Beogradsko proleće '81) | 1981 |
| "Rano jutro" | Ruleta 5 | 1984 |
| "Unutarnja panika" | Pop rock express vol. 2 - Godine 80 i neke | 2003 |
| "Trenutni lek" | Pop rock express vol. 3 - Godine 80 i neke | 2003 |
| "Nestašni dečaci" | Niko kao ja - jugoslovenski novi talas | 1996 |
| "Unutarnja panika" | Pop-rock 80-tih 3 | 2006 |
| "Nestašni dečaci" | Pop-rock hitovi 80-ih | 2006 |
