= Antologija 1983–1998 I =

Antologija 1982 - 1998 I

Compilation album by Kerber
- Released: 1998
- Recorded: 1982–1996
- Genre: Hard rock; heavy metal; arena rock
- Label: Raglas Records

Kerber chronology
Unplugged (1998)	Antologija 1982 - 1998 I (1998)	Antologija 1983–1998 II (1998)

Antologija 1983–1998 I (trans. Anthology 1983–1998 I) is the first compilation album by Serbian and Yugoslav hard rock band Kerber, released in 1998. It was the first of two compilation albums the band released in 1998, the second one being Antologija 1983–1998 II. The album features songs from the band's studio albums released during the 1983–1996 period.

== Track listing ==
No.	Title	Length
1.	"Mezimac"
2.	"Bele utvare"
3.	"Nebo je malo za sve"
4.	"Ratne igre"
5.	"Hteo bih"
6.	"Hajde da se volimo"
7.	"Čovek od meda"
8.	"Luka"
9.	"Sanjam"
10.	"Blagi Bože podigni me"
11.	"Svet se brzo okreće"
12.	"Od srca daleko"
13.	"Igraj sad"
14.	"Mama - tata"
15.	"Medena"
16.	"Kad prođe sve"

== Credits ==
- Goran Šepa - vocals
- Tomislav Nikolić - guitar
- Branislav Božinović - keyboard
- Zoran Žikić - bass guitar
- Zoran Stamenković - drums
- Dragoljub Đuričić - drums
- Branko Isaković - bass guitar
- Saša Vasković - bass guitar
- Josip Hartl - drums
- Vladan Stanojević - acoustic guitar
- Goran Đorđević - percussion
