= Antologija 1983–1998 II =

Antologija 1982 - 1998 II

Compilation album by Kerber
- Released: 1998
- Recorded: 1982–1996
- Genre: Hard rock; arena rock
- Label: Raglas Records

Kerber chronology
Antologija 1983–1998 I (1998)	Antologija 1982 - 1998 II (1998)	Sabrana dela (2009)

Antologija 1983–1998 II (trans. Anthology 1983–1998 II) is the second compilation album by Serbian and Yugoslav hard rock band Kerber, released in 1998. It was the second of two compilation albums the band released in 1998, the first one being Antologija 1983–1998 I. The album features ballads and acoustic songs from the band's studio albums released during the 1983-1996 period.

== Track listing ==
No.	Title	Length
1.	"Seobe"
2.	"Još samo ovu noć mi daj"
3.	"Tvoja pesma"
4.	"Sutrašnji dan"
5.	"Kad ljubav izda"
6.	"Na raskršću"
7.	"Bolje da sam druge ljubio"
8.	"Čudna stvar"
9.	"Poslednja"
10.	"Nažalost"
11.	"Nikad ponovo"
12.	"Zauvek slobodna"
13.	"Sam"
14.	"Osvani"

== Credits ==
- Goran Šepa - vocals
- Tomislav Nikolić - guitar
- Branislav Božinović - keyboard
- Zoran Žikić - bass guitar
- Zoran Stamenković - drums
- Dragoljub Đuričić - drums
- Branko Isaković - bass guitar
- Saša Vasković - bass guitar
- Josip Hartl - drums
- Vladan Stanojević - acoustic guitar
- Goran Đorđević - percussion
