= Abonos =

Serbian gothic metal band

- Origin: Belgrade, Serbia
- Genres: Gothic metal, symphonic metal, thrash metal
- Years active: 1999–2007
- Labels: Rock Express Records, Porodična Manufaktura
- Members: Marija Dokmanović; Jakša Vlahović; Tomas Ljumović; Jovan Prokopić; Milan Janković
- Past members: Marta Vlahović; Nikola Vrhovac; Vladimir Lalić

Abonos (Serbian Cyrillic: Абонос; trans. Ebony) is a Serbian gothic metal band from Belgrade.

The guitarist Jakša Vlahović and a former keyboardist and vocalist Marta Vlahović are brother and sister and children of graphic artist and former Porodična Manufaktura Crnog Hleba member Jugoslav Vlahović. Jakša Vlahović was a guitarist for the speed/thrash metal band Bombarder until 2010. Drummer Milan Janković is alongside drummer for Bombarder.

Jakša Vlahović and Marija Dokmanović, as professional graphic artists, are the authors of complete visual identity of the group (logo, CD covers, posters, T-shirts, etc.).

== Biography ==
The band was formed at the end of 1999. The original lineup consisted of Jakša Vlahović (guitar), his sister Marta Vlahović (vocals, keyboards), Marija Dokmanović (vocals, keyboards), Nikola Vrhovac (guitar), Vladimir Lalić (vocals, bass guitar), and Milan Janković (drums). In 2001, they recorded their first official demo, featuring six songs, and in 2002 appeared on various artists album Demo Express 202, released by Rock Express Records in cooperation with Radio 202, with the song "Izlaz" ("Exit").

The band recorded their debut self-titled album in Kazablanka Studio in Belgrade during 2003. The album was officially released on December 6, 2004, through the band's own record label Porodična Manufaktura. In 2006, Vrhovac, Lalić and Marta Vlahović left the band, and were replaced by Jovan Prokopić (Seraphim) and Tomas Ljumović, respectively.

In 2007, the band released the single "Urlik" ("Howl"), which was given with the book of poems Oka da ne ispustim dah by poet Milan B. Popović, who is the author of the "Urlik" lyrics. Jakša Vlahović designed the book covers and illustrated the book. The single was produced by Alogia member Srđan Branković. With the release of the single, the band announced the release of their new studio album. In 2010, "Urlik" appeared on the various artists album Vreme brutalnih dobronamernika, which featured seventeen bands which recorded the songs on Milan B. Popović poems.

== Discography ==
=== Studio albums ===
- Abonos (2004)

=== Other appearances ===
- "Urlik" (Vreme brutalnih dobronamernika, 2007)
