= Priče o vremenu i životu – Live at SKC =

Priče o vremenu i životu - Live at SKC

Live album by Alogia
- Released: December 2006
- Recorded: May 13, 2005; Studentski kulturni centar, Belgrade
- Genre: Progressive metal Power metal Heavy metal Hard rock
- Length: 77:43
- Label: One Records
- Producer: Srđan Branković

Alogia chronology
Secret Spheres of Art (2005)	Priče o vremenu i životu - Live at SKC (2006)	Priče o snovima (2012)

Professional ratings
Review scores
Source	Rating
Serbian-metal.org	(favorable)

Priče o vremenu i životu – Live at SKC (trans. Tales of Time and Life – Live at SKC) is the first live album by and Serbian heavy metal band Alogia, released in 2006. The album was recorded on May 13, 2005, in Studentski kulturni centar in Belgrade.

The album features numerous guest musicians from the top bands of the former Yugoslav hard rock and heavy metal scene: Osvajači guitarist Dragan Urošević, Riblja Čorba guitarist Vidoja Božinović and drummer Vicko Milatović, Kerber vocalist Goran Šepa, and Divlje Jagode guitarist Sead Lipovača. The album also features Dunja Deurić and Damjan Deurić from the Serbian gothic/power metal band Demether on backing vocals.

== Track listing ==
1. "Metamorfoza I" - 5:43
2. "Metamorfoza II" - 3:12
3. "Novi dan" - 4:39
4. "Zar sunce već zalazi" - 4:28
5. "Kao snegovi" - 3:35
6. "Magija" - 4:30
7. "Maska" (Osvajači cover, featuring Dragan Urošević) - 4:07
8. "Vreme istine" - 4:39
9. "Samson" - 3:38
10. "Gde si u ovom glupom hotelu" (Riblja Čorba cover, featuring Vidoja Božinović and Vicko Milatović) - 5:47
11. "Lament" - 5:48
12. "Amon" - 3:51
13. "Hajde da se volimo" (Kerber cover, featuring Goran Šepa) - 4:26
14. "Mezimac" (Kerber cover, featuring Goran Šepa) - 4:01
15. "Egregor" - 3:14
16. "Bajka" - 3:43
17. "Motori" (Divlje Jagode cover, featuring Sead Lipovača) - 4:36
18. "Sećanje na slike iz sna" - 3:46

== DVD version ==
Priče o vremenu i životu

Video by Alogia
- Released: October 2, 2007
- Recorded: May 13, 2005; Studentski kulturni centar, Belgrade
- Genre: Progressive metal Power metal Heavy metal Hard rock
- Label: One Records

Professional ratings
Review scores
Source	Rating
Serbian-metal.org	(favorable)

The DVD version was released in 2007. It featured three additional tracks: "Tonem u san", "What a Feeling" and "Priča o životu". It also featured bonus consisting of interviews, clips from Alogia performances at the EXIT festival and Belgrade Beer Fest, and official music videos for "What a Feeling" and "Novi dan".

=== Tracks ===
1. "Metamorfoza I"
2. "Metamorfoza II"
3. "Novi dan"
4. "Zar sunce već zalazi"
5. "Kao snegovi"
6. "Maska"
7. "Tonem u san"
8. "Magija"
9. "Gde si u ovom glupom hotelu"
10. "Lament"
11. "Vreme istine"
12. "What a Feeling" (Irene Cara cover)
13. "Bajka"
14. "Hajde da se volimo"
15. "Mezimac"
16. "Samson"
17. "Egregor" - 3:14
18. "Motori"
19. "Amon"
20. "Priča o životu"
21. "Sećanje na slike iz sna"

== Personnel ==
- Nikola Mijić - vocals
- Srđan Branković - guitar
- Miroslav Branković - guitar
- Ivan Vasić - bass guitar
- Branislav Dabić - keyboards
- Vladimir Đedović - keyboards
- Damir Adžić - Drums

=== Guest musicians ===
- Dragan Urošević - guitar (on "Maska")
- Vidoja Božinović - guitar (on "Gde si u ovom glupom hotelu")
- Vicko Milatović - drums (on "Gde si u ovom glupom hotelu")
- Goran Šepa - vocals (on "Hajde da se volimo" and "Mezimac")
- Sead Lipovača - guitar (on "Motori")
- Dunja Deurić - backing vocals
- Damjan Deurić - backing vocals
