= Poslednja mladost u Jugoslaviji =

Studio album by Krstić & Šaper
- Released: 1987
- Recorded: 1986
- Genre: Pop rock
- Length: 41:12
- Label: Jugoton
- Producer: Nebojša Krstić; Srđan Šaper; Branko Isaković; Srđan Gojković

Poslednja mladost u Jugoslaviji is the first solo album by former Idoli members Nebojša Krstić and Srđan Šaper. For the occasion, the two formed a backing band Unutrašnja Imperija.

== History ==
After Idoli split up, the first solo release by any Idoli member was Poslednja mladost u Jugoslaviji by Krstić & Šaper. The two started writing and recording new material in 1986 and the album came out in 1987 through Jugoton. The two also formed a backing band, Unutrašnja Imperija featuring Gagi Mihajlović (guitar), Branko Isaković (bass) and Dragoljub Đuričić (drums). The material and album production was done by Krstić & Šaper themselves with the help of Branko Isaković and Srđan Gojković.

== Track listing ==
1. "16 godina" (3:16) (Nebojša Krstić, Srđan Šaper)
2. "Divlja devojka" (3:24) (Šaper)
3. "Haljine" (3:12) (Krstić)
4. "Ti i ja" (4:08) (Šaper)
5. "Razvod 1999" (3:38) (Šaper)
6. "Sutra nije nikada" (3:17) (Krstić)
7. "Ne, ne, ne" (3:37) (Šaper)
8. "Parada" (3:16) (Šaper)
9. "Kad si je prvi put poljubio" (2:46) (Šaper)
10. "Čovek časa" (3:32) (Šaper)
11. "Odjednom" (2:45) (Krstić, Šaper)
12. "Bliži se čas" (4:21) (Šaper)

== Personnel ==
- Nebojša Krstić (vocals)
- Srđan Šaper (vocals)
- Dragomir Mihajlović "Gagi" (guitar)
- Branko Isaković (bass)
- Dragoljub Đuričić (drums)
