= Priče o životu =

Studio album by Alogia
- Released: September 2004
- Genre: Progressive metal Power metal
- Length: 76:18
- Label: One Records
- Producer: Srđan Branković; Miroslav Branković

Alogia chronology
Priče o vremenu (2002)	Priče o životu (2004)	Secret Spheres of Art (2005)

Professional ratings
Review scores
Source	Rating
Serbian-metal.org	(favorable)

Priče o životu (trans. Tales of Life) is the second studio album by Serbian heavy metal band Alogia, released in 2004.

== Track listing ==
1. "Reditus" - 4:38
2. "Novi dan" - 6:23
3. "Trgovci dušama" - 4:37
4. "Još samo ovaj put" - 4:57
5. "Metamorfoza" - 10:14
6. "Kao snegovi" - 3:42
7. "Egregor" - 3:09
8. "Magija" - 7:24
9. "Putnik na raskršću" - 5:49
10. "Lišće minulih jeseni" - 5:40
11. "Ambis" - 3:53
12. "Vreme istine" - 4:27
13. "Priča o životu" - 3:57
14. "30072003" - 4:10
15. "What a Feeling" (Bonus track) - 3:19

=== Limited edition bonus track ===
16. "Gde si u ovom glupom hotelu"
17. "Summernight Romance"
18. "Before The Leaving"
19. "Satin Doll"

== Personnel ==
- Nikola Mijić - vocals
- Srđan Branković - guitar
- Miroslav Branković - guitar
- Ivan Vasić - bass guitar
- Branislav Dabić - keyboards
- Vladimir Đedović - keyboards
- Damir Adžić - drums
