= Secret Spheres of Art =

Studio album by Alogia
- Released: January 24, 2005
- Genre: Progressive metal Power metal
- Length: 43:54
- Label: Locomotive Music

Alogia chronology
Priče o životu (2004)	Secret Spheres of Art (2005)	Priče o vremenu i životu – Live at SKC (2006)

Professional ratings
Review scores
Source	Rating
Serbian-metal.org	(mixed)
Stormbringer	4/5 stars

Secret Spheres of Art is the third studio album by Serbian heavy metal band Alogia, released in 2005.

The album features Alogia's old songs rerecorded with English language lyrics. It was released through Spanish record label Locomotive Music.

== Track listing ==
1. "Secret Sphere" - 6:08
2. "Journey into the Dawn of Life" - 1:00
3. "Politics of War" - 4:03
4. "Legend of a Stolen Heart" - 3:28
5. "Falling Asleep" - 4:45
6. "Kontinuum" - 2:10
7. "Mystica Aegyptiorum" - 0:57
8. "Amon" - 3:32
9. "Beyond the Time" - 3:28
10. "Lament" - 4:28
11. "Astral Horizons" - 0:51
12. "As the Time Passes by" - 3:43
13. "Overture Soleminis" - 1:41
14. "Samson" - 3:35

=== Bonus tracks ===
15. "What a Feeling" - 3:19

== Personnel ==
- Nikola Mijić - vocals
- Srđan Branković - guitar
- Miroslav Branković - guitar
- Ivan Vasić - bass guitar
- Branislav Dabić - keyboards
- Vladimir Đedović - keyboards
- Damir Adžić - drums
