= Kerber (band) =

Serbian rock band

- Kerber performing in Niš on their thirtieth anniversary concert, 2011

Background information
- Origin: Niš, SR Serbia, Yugoslavia
- Genres: Hard rock; heavy metal; arena rock
- Years active: 1981–present
- Labels: ZKP RTLJ, PGP-RTB, PGP-RTS, Take It Or Leave It Records, Raglas Records
- Members: Goran Šepa; Tomislav Nikolić; Branislav Božinović; Zoran Madić; Josip Hartl; Nebojša Minić
- Past members: Zoran Žikić; Boban Đorđević; Dragoljub Đuričić; Milorad Džmerković; Branko Isaković; Zoran Stamenković; Saša Vasković; Vladan Stanojević; Goran Đorđević; Nemanja Gušić; Vlada Karadžov
- Website: www.kerber.rs

Kerber (Serbian Cyrillic: Кербер, lit. 'Cerberus') is a Serbian and Yugoslav hard rock band formed in Niš in 1981. The band was formed by vocalist Goran Šepa "Gale", guitarist Tomislav "Tomica" Nikolić, keyboardist Branislav "Bane" Božinović, bass guitarist Zoran Madić and drummer Zoran Stamenković; throughout the following decades, Šepa, Nikolić and Božinović would remain the mainstay members of the group. Their sound has evolved from heavy rock on their debut album towards melodic hard rock on their mid- and late 1980s releases.

The group's debut album, released in 1983, brought them nationwide popularity. Their following releases launched them to the top of the Yugoslav hard rock scene, with a number of their songs becoming hits, most prominently their power ballads with poetic lyrics written by lyricist Duško Arsenijević, and the band's bass guitarist Zoran "Sosa" Žikić enjoying public's attention for his on-stage theatrics. The band released their latest studio album in 1996, performing occasionally only during the following decade. In early 2010s the band returned to live performances, releasing several new singles and a live album since.

== Band history ==
=== 1980s ===
The band's beginnings can be tracked back to the band Top (Cannon), active in Niš at the beginning of the 1980s. Top performed their own songs, as well as covers of songs by foreign hard rock acts, often cooperating with the Treća polovina (Third Half) theatre. They gained local popularity, but did not have a steady lineup. In 1981, a steady lineup was formed, featuring Goran Šepa "Gale" (vocals), Tomislav "Tomica" Nikolić (guitar), Branislav "Bane" Božinović (keyboards), Zoran Stamenković (drums) and Zoran Madić (bass guitar). They adopted the name Kerber and decided to perform their own material. The songs were composed by all of the members, and the lyrics were written by Stamenković.

Kerber had their first official concert in November 1981, in Muzički klub (Music Club) in Niš. During 1982, the band had numerous concerts in Niš and across Serbia, while working on the material for their first album. In early spring of 1982, Madić left the band to serve his mandatory stint in the Yugoslav army, and was replaced by former Mama Rock and Plamteće Nebo (Flaming Sky) member Zoran "Sosa" Žikić. Žikić had impressionable stage performances: he played an axe-shaped guitar and performed fire breathing. In May 1983, Kerber won the first place at the prominent Subotica Youth Festival with the song "Mezimac" ("Minion"). Several days after this success, they performed as an opening band on Galija concert in Belgrade's Tašmajdan Stadium.

In July 1983, Kerber recorded their debut album, Nebo je malo za sve (The Sky Is not Big Enough for All), produced by Gordon Rowley, bass guitarist of the British heavy metal band Nightwing. Kerber members met Rowley while he was performing in Yugoslavia as a member of Peter Green's backing band, and after hearing the group's demo recordings, Rowley got interested in working with them. The album was recorded in Aquarius studio in Belgrade and mixed at Strawberry Studio in Manchester. It was released on ZKP RTLJ record label and immediately became successful, with 10,000 copies sold during the first week of the album sale. The album brought nationwide hits "Mezimac", "Nebo je malo za sve" and "Heroji od staniola" ("Tin Foil Heroes"). After the album release, Kerber performed as the opening band on Uriah Heep and Ten Years After concerts in Yugoslavia.

In January 1984, during the tour through Macedonia, Stamenković contracted infectious hepatitis, so in March, during the Kerber's performance at the music festival in Opatija, he was temporarily replaced by Generacija 5 drummer Slobodan Đorđević. Despite the good performance, Kerber did not fit well in the pop format of the Opatija festival. During the tour, the band performed in Belgrade's Sava Centar on a various artist concert organized by ITD teen magazine, but the band's performance was interrupted after their pyrotechnics accidentally set fire to the stage. On 19 May 1984, during the band's open-air concert in Novi Sad, Žikić got second-degree burns while attempting to breathe fire under windy conditions. He continued the concert despite doctor's advice, and later on continued the tour with bandages on his face. After this accident, other members forbade Žikić to continue performing the fire-breathing act. On 25 May 1984, the band performed, with a number of other bands, on a large open-air concert on the Square of Marx and Engels in Belgrade, organised as a part of Youth Day celebration, and in June 1984, they were the opening act on Nightwing concerts in Yugoslavia. During the summer of 1984, the band performed in the discoteque Zana in Greece, and in October they were rejoined by Stamenković.

In December 1984, Kerber traveled to Great Britain to record their second album, Ratne Igre (War Games). The album was recorded in Saughall, and the producer was once again Gordon Rowley. During their stay in Britain, Kerber performed in clubs in Liverpool and Chester. An English language version of "Mezimac", entitled "Get Me Out", was recorded on their concert in Liverpool and included on the album. Part of the album lyrics were written by the lyricist Duško Arsenijević, who would continue to work with Kerber on their future releases. In May 1985, only a week after Ratne igre was released, Stamenković went to serve the army and Slobodan Đorđević replaced him once again. On 15 June that year, Kerber, alongside 23 other acts, performed on the Red Star Stadium, on the concert which was a part of YU Rock Misija, a Yugoslav contribution to Live Aid. In October 1985, Slobodan Đorđević moved to the United States, and was replaced by former Mama Co Co, YU Grupa and Leb i Sol member Dragoljub Đuričić. In November of the same year, Kerber was awarded with Smeli Cvet (Courageous Flower) award, given by the League of Communist Youth of Serbia for contribution to Yugoslav rock music.

In 1986, Kerber recorded their third studio album, Seobe (Migrations), which was produced by composer and former Korni Grupa leader Kornelije Kovač. Most of the album lyrics were written by Arsenijević, with two songs featuring lyrics written by Riblja Čorba frontman Bora Đorđević, and two songs featuring lyrics written by Riblja Čorba guitarist Nikola Čuturilo. The album brought numerous hits: "Hajde da se volimo" ("Let's Make Love"), "Čovek od meda" ("Man Made of Honey", which featured Bora Đorđević on vocals), power ballads "Kad ljubav izda" ("When Love Betrays", which featured a quotation from Pero Zubac's poem "Mostar Rains"), "Još samo ovu noć mi daj" ("Give Me just This more Night"), "Bolje da sam druge ljubio" ("I Should've Been Kissing Other Girls") and "Seobe", the latter inspired by the 1980s emigrations of Serbs from Kosovo. Following the success of Seobe, Kerber performed more than 200 concerts across Yugoslavia. The band went on the promotional tour with keyboardist Milorad Džmerković, formerly of Slomljena Stakla and Peđa D' Boy Band, as Branislav Božinović had to leave the band in July 1986, only a month after Seobe recording, to serve his stint in the Yugoslav army. In their home city Kerber held a concert on the Železničar Stadium, on 16 May 1987, featuring numerous guest bands.

In 1988, the band released the album Ljudi i bogovi (Humans and gods), produced by Đorđe Petrović. By the time of the recording, Božinović had served his stint in the army and rejoined the group. Major hits were "Svet se brzo okreće" ("The World Is Turning Fast") and the ballad "Na raskršću" ("At the Crossroads"). The lyrics were written by Duško Arsenijević, with a part of them dealing with political topics. In the summer of the same year, Žikić left the band, and was replaced by former Suncokret, Bulevar, Propaganda and Idoli member Branko Isaković, which, due to Žikić being well-known for his stage performances, saw large covering in the Yugoslav press.

The band recorded their first live album, 121288 Uživo, on a concert held in Belgrade Youth Center on 12 December 1988 (thus 121288 in the album title). The album was hastily recorded and mixed and as a result not well received by fans and music critics. In 1989, Kerber held another concert on the Železničar Stadium in Niš and a one-month tour across the Soviet Union, performing in Moscow, Leningrad, Yalta and other cities.

=== 1990s ===
At the end of 1990, the band released their fifth studio album, Peta strana sveta (The Fifth Side of the World), which was produced by Saša Habić. The album lyrics were written by Duško Arsenijević and Bora Đorđević and the song "Ljubav je" ("Love Is") was composed by Generacija 5 keyboardist Dragoljub Ilić. Several songs featured Nenad Petrović on saxophone and the song "Mama – tata" ("Mom – Dad") featured a children's choir. Soon after the album release, Đuričić left the band to rejoin Leb i Sol, and was replaced by Josip "Joško" Hartl, formerly of the band Frenky. For the retrospective evening of the 1991 Belgrade Spring Festival, Kerber recorded a cover of Zdravko Čolić's song "April u Beogradu" ("April in Belgrade"), which was released on the festival's compilation album Beograde ((Oh,) Belgrade) in 1991. After this event, the band made a longer break in their work, during which they recorded music for the theatre play Blues osmeh (Blues Smile). On 23 April 1994, the group held an unplugged concert in the building of the Niš National Theatre. The concert featured the members of the Niš Symphony Orchestra and the members of the church choir Branko.

At the beginning of 1996, Kerber released the studio album Zapis (Inscription), produced by Vladimir Negovanović. The album introduced new members: Saša Vasković (bass guitar), Vladan Stanojević (acoustic guitar), and Goran Đorđević (percussion). For the first time in the band's career, the lineup included acoustic guitar and percussion, and instead of Božinović's trademark synthesizer sound, most of the songs featured him playing Hammond organ. Van Gogh frontman Zvonimir Đukić "Đule" made a guest appearance on the album, playing guitar. In January 1996, the band held an unplugged concert in Studio M in Novi Sad. The recording of this concert was released on the album Unplugged in 1998. The recordings were originally released on two separate audio cassettes by Take Or Leave It Records, and later self-released by the band on a single CD in 1999. At the end of 1996, Kerber held a concert in the Niš central city square as a part of the 1996 Serbian protests organized in response to electoral fraud. In 1998, in addition to Unplugged, the band released two compilation albums: Antologija 1983–1998 I (Anthology 1983–1998 I) and Antologija 1983–1998 II (Anthology 1983–1998 II), with the detailed overview of their work. During the same year, they celebrated their 15th anniversary with a concert held in Niš fortress. The concert featured the Niš Symphonic Orchestra, the church choir Branko and Kornelije Kovač as guests. In 1999, they performed as the opening band on Dio concert in Sofia, Bulgaria, and soon after went on hiatus.

=== 2000s ===
During the 2000s Kerber, although officially still active, performed occasionally only. On 9 February 2006, the band reunited in its original lineup for the first time after twenty-three years, to celebrate their 25th anniversary with a concert in the building of Serbian National Theatre in Novi Sad. In 2008, PGP-RTS released the compilation album Svet se brzo okreće – The Best of, and in 2009, the same record label released the Kerber box set entitled Sabrana dela (Collected Works). The box set featured all six Kerber studio albums on CDs and the new song "Sveti Nikola" ("Saint Nicholas") on the seventh disc. After the box set was released, Kerber original bass guitarist, Zoran Madić, returned to the band, and the band was soon joined by the second guitarist, Nebojša Minić, a former member of the bands Gidra i Erotske Čokoladice (Gidra and the Erotic Chocolates) and Puls (Pulse).

=== 2010s ===
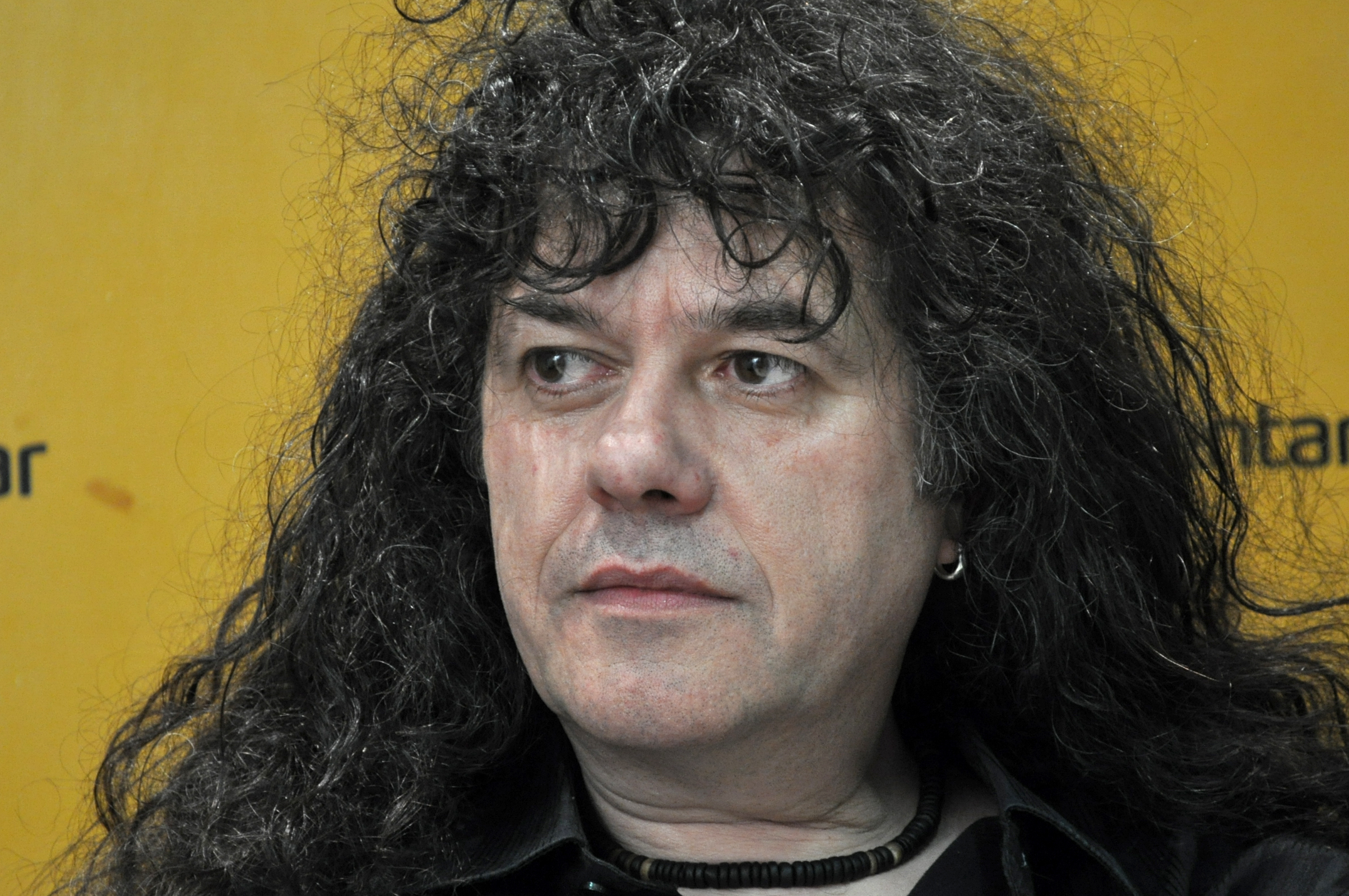
Goran Šepa in 2011

The band celebrated their 30th anniversary with three concerts. The first one was held in Čair Hall in Niš on 15 December 2011. The concert featured numerous guests: the band's former members Zoran Stamenković, Vlada Karadžov, Goran Đorđević, Vladan Stanojević, Branko Isaković and Dragoljub Đuričić, Neverne Bebe, YU Grupa, Kornelije Kovač, Smak vocalist Dejan Najdanović and Constantine choir. The second concert was held in SPENS hall in Novi Sad on 6 April 2012. The third and final concert was held in Belgrade Sports Hall on 13 December 2012. The concert featured Bora Đorđević as guest.

In 2017, PGP-RTS released the compilation album Specijal (Special Edition), featuring 17 remastered songs from the 1986–1996 period. In 2018, the same record label released the box set Unplugged Live Sava Centar. The box set featured two DVD discs with the recording of the unplugged concert the band held in Belgrade's Sava Centar on 12 December 2017, as well as the audio CD with the recordings from the concert. The concert and the album featured two previously unrecorded songs, "Ne govori"("Don't Speak") and "Pepeo i prah".

=== 2020s ===
On 15 March 2021 Kerber's former drummer Dragoljub Đuričić died from complications caused by COVID-19 during the COVID-19 pandemic in Serbia. He was 68.

On 31 January 2021, Kerber released the single "Bestraga sve" ("Damn It All"), their first studio recording in twelve years. The song lyrics were written by Nikola Čuturilo. The script for the song video was written by writer Miloš Petković, and the video featured actress Petra Nešić of the Niš Academic Theatre. In 2021, the band planned to celebrate their 40th anniversary with two large concerts, in Belgrade and Niš, but the concerts were postponed due to COVID-19 pandemic. The concerts were held in 2022; the Belgrade concert was held in Trade Union Hall on 10 February as an unplugged performance, and the Niš concert was held in the Niš Fortress amphitheatre on 11 June.

The band's former keyboardist Milorad Džmerković died on 26 September 2022.

In October 2022, writer Miloš Petković published a book about the band, entitled Kerber: Hronike troglavog psa (Kerber: The Chronicles of Three-Headed Dog). By scanning a QR code in the book, the buyers had an exclusive access to the band's new song "Suze kroz noć" ("Tears Through the Night"). In March 2025, the band expressed their support for the ongoing anti-corruption protests led by Serbian students.

== Legacy ==
Serbian rock singer Viktorija recorded a cover of the song "Seobe" on her 2000 album Nostalgija (Nostalgia). Serbian heavy metal band Alogia covered the songs "Mezimac" and "Hajde da se volimo" on their 2006 live album Priče o vremenu i životu – Live at SKC (Tales of Time and Life – Live at SKC), with Šepa making a guest appearance on the songs. Serbian hard rock and heavy metal band Atlantida recorded a cover of the song "Igraj sad" ("Dance Now") on their 2009 album Put u večnost (Road to Eternity).

In 2000, the song "Seobe" was polled No.43 on Rock Express Top 100 Yugoslav Rock Songs of All Times list. In 2011, the song "Mezimac" was polled, by the listeners of Radio 202, one of 60 greatest songs released by PGP-RTB/PGP-RTS during the sixty years of the label's existence.

== Discography ==
Studio albums

- Nebo je malo za sve (1983)
- Ratne igre (1985)
- Seobe (1986)
- Ljudi i bogovi (1988)
- Peta strana sveta (1990)
- Zapis (1996)

Live albums

- 121288 Uživo (1989)
- Unplugged (1998)
- Unplugged Live Sava Centar (2018)
