= Priče o vremenu =

Studio album by Alogia
- Released: February 2002
- Recorded: 2000–2001; Paradox Studio, Smederevo
- Genre: Progressive metal Power metal
- Length: 47:18
- Label: One Records
- Producer: Srđan Branković; Miroslav Branković

Alogia chronology
Priče o vremenu (2002)	Priče o životu (2004)

Professional ratings
Review scores
Source	Rating
Serbian-metal.org	(favorable)

Priče o vremenu (trans. Tales of Time) is the first studio album by Serbian heavy metal band Alogia, released in 2002.

The song "Zar sunce već zalazi" is a Serbian language cover of Conception song "Roll the Fire", and the song "Sećanje na slike iz sna" is a cover of Pretty Maids song "A Place in the Night".

The cover art was designed by the band members, Ivan Vasić and the Branković brothers, except for the Alogia logo, designed by Christophe Szpajdel.

== Track listing ==
1. "Kontinuum" (S. Branković, M. Branković) – 2:10
2. "Mystica Aegyptiorum" (M. Branković) – 0:46
3. "Amon" (S. Branković, M. Branković) – 3:33
4. "Put u zoru života" (M. Branković) – 1:03
5. "Zar sunce već zalazi" (R. Khan, T. Østby, M. Branković) – 4:36
6. "Bajka" (S. Branković, M. Branković) – 3:27
7. "Lament" (M. Branković) – 4:29
8. "Tonem u san" (S. Branković, M. Branković) – 5:01
9. "Igra" (S. Branković, M. Branković) – 3:32
10. "Astralni horizonti" (M. Branković) – 0:52
11. "Sećanje na slike iz sna" (Pretty Maids, M. Branković) – 3:40
12. "Iznad vremena" (S. Branković, M. Branković) – 3:39
13. "Uvertira Solemnis" (S. Branković, M. Branković) – 1:42
14. "Samson" (M. Branković) – 4:15
15. "Gizmo" (S. Branković, M. Branković) – 5:19

== Personnel ==
- Nikola Mijić – vocals
- Srđan Branković – guitar
- Miroslav Branković – guitar
- Ivan Vasić – bass guitar
- Branislav Dabić – keyboards
- Vladimir Đedović – keyboards
- Damir Adžić – drums

=== Guest musicians ===
- Ivica Lauš – vocals (on "Zar sunce već zalazi", "Lament" and "Samson")
- Bojan Milovanović – vocals (on "Tonem u san" and "Igra")
- Aleksandar Radojičić – percussion, flute (on "Gizmo")
- Nemanja Plazinić – backing vocals
- Ana Useinović – backing vocals
