= Draconic =

Serbian musical band

- Origin: Belgrade, Serbia
- Genres: Symphonic black metal Industrial metal Progressive metal
- Years active: 2003 - present
- Label: Noisehead Records
- Members: Jovan Dorkin; David Lazar Galić; Milan Jejina; Branislav Stanković; Vanja Dušan Andrijašević
- Past members: Miloš Kovačević; Jelena Stanićević; Marjan Mijić; Matija Dagovic; Uroš Andrijašević
- Website: Official MySpace

Draconic is a progressive metal band from Serbia. Formed in 2003, Draconic was initially a symphonic black metal band, and with the release of the second studio album, From the Wrong Side of the Aperture the band moved towards more progressive-oriented sound.

== History ==
The band started out in 2003 as a solo project of keyboardist Branislav Stanković, who, with the help of members of the progressive/power metal band AlogiA, recorded an album entitled Conflux. The album was released in 2004 by Rock Express Records. With intentions of turning the Draconic studio project into an actual working band, Stanković enlisted several metal musicians from Belgrade, two of which were Vanja Dušan Andrijašević (guitar) and David Lazar Galić (bass guitar). When the promotional tour of Conflux ended, the band began working on new material. In the following years, the band recorded demos that marked their shift from the symphonic black metal sound and was looking for new members that would complete the lineup. After the lineup has been established, the culmination of the writing process of new material came in the fall of 2008, with the completion of the band's second album called From the Wrong Side of the Aperture, that was generally well-received critically. The album featured different sound from the first one, being more progressive-oriented. The album was released in April 2009. Soon after, the band performed at the EXIT Festival in Novi Sad in 2009. Meanwhile, Marjan Mijić left the band soon after the release of From the Wrong Side of the Aperture for personal reasons. The band had found a new lead vocalist Jelena Stanićević, who performed a couple of live shows with the band (including the EXIT Festival), but also left the band. The band is currently writing material for the third album.

== Influences ==
Draconic is mainly influenced by metal bands that the members grew up listening to during the 1990s, with Strapping Young Lad, Soilwork and Meshuggah being some of the band's main influences. Other influences include Pantera, In Flames, Megadeth and Dream Theater, among many other underground metal acts of the 1980s and 1990s.

== Band members ==
Current Members:

- Jovan Dorkin - vocals
- David Lazar Galić - bass guitar, vocals
- Branislav Stanković - keyboards
- Vanja Dušan Andrijašević - guitar
- Milan Jejina - drums and percussion

Former:

- Marjan Mijić - lead vocals
- Uroš Andrijašević - guitar
- Miloš "MC Mike" Kovačević - drums and percussion
- Jelena Stanićević - lead vocals
- Matija Dagović - drums

== Discography ==
=== Studio albums ===
- Conflux (2004)
- From the Wrong Side of the Aperture (2009)

=== Singles ===
- Hospitals (2011)
