= Conflux (album) =

Studio album by Draconic
- Released: 2009
- Recorded: November 2002
- Genre: Melodic death metal
- Length: 39:34
- Label: Rock Express Records

Draconic chronology
Conflux (2009)	From the Wrong Side of the Aperture (2009)

Conflux is the debut studio album from the Serbian metal band Draconic. The album was recorded in 2002, and released in 2004 through Rock Express Records. Although officially the debut Draconic album, Conflux is basically a project by keyboardist Branislav Stanković. The album features AlogiA members Srđan Branković on guitar, Miroslav Branković on guitar, and Damir Adžić on drums.

== Track listing ==
1. "Supernova" - 02:01
2. "Stormillenium" - 05:39
3. "Jupiter Ceremony" - 05:24
4. "Ultimate Astral Messengers / Cosmic Connections" - 11:15
5. "Solaris" - 05:03
6. "Exordium" - 05:10
7. "Zero-Gravity" - 05:00

== Personnel ==
- Branislav Stanković - keyboards, vocals
- Srđan Branković - guitar
- Miroslav Branković - guitar
- Milan Šuput - bass guitar
- Damir Adžić - drums
- Mihaela Gačić - vocals
