= Conflux =

Conflux may refer to:

- Conflux AB, The heating company
- Confluence, the meeting of two or more bodies of water
- Conflux (album), 2002 album by Serbin band Draconic
- Psy-Geo-Conflux, New York City festival
- Conflux (Magic: The Gathering), a Magic: The Gathering expansion set that is part of the Alara block
- a faction in Armageddonʼs Blade, a Heroes of Might and Magic III expansion
