= Priče o snovima =

Studio album by Alogia
- Released: March 4, 2012
- Genre: Hard rock, heavy metal
- Length: 44:43
- Label: Power Music
- Producer: Srđan Branković; Miroslav Branković

Alogia chronology
Priče o vremenu i životu – Live at SKC (2006)	Priče o snovima (2012)

Professional ratings
Review scores
Source	Rating
Balkanrock.com	2.5/5 stars
Serbian-metal.org	7/10 stars

Priče o snovima (trans. Tales of Dreams) is the fourth studio album by Serbian heavy metal band Alogia, released in 2012. The album featured softer, more hard rock-oriented sound than the band's previous releases, which were mostly progressive/power metal-oriented.

== Track listing ==
No.	Title	Length
1.	"Mi sanjamo" ("We Are Dreaming")	3:51
2.	"Milion godina" ("Million Years")	3:36
3.	"Imam svoj mali svet" ("I Have My Own Little World")	3:22
4.	"Za nove pobede" ("For New Victories")	3:35
5.	"Sudnji dan" ("Judgement Day")	3:20
6.	"Iza zidova" ("Behind the Walls")	3:44
7.	"Od svega umoran" ("Tired of Everything")	3:29
8.	"Kad prođe sve" ("When All Is Over")	3:56
9.	"Prvo jutro bez tebe (Oproštaj)" ("First Morning without You (Saying Goodbye)")	4:03
10.	"Naša istina" ("Our Truth")	4:09
11.	"Ljubav je ostala gladna" ("Love Remained Hungry")	4:24
12.	"Ovo je kraj" ("This Is the End")	3:14

== Personnel ==
- Nikola Mijić - vocals
- Srđan Branković - guitar
- Miroslav Branković - guitar
- Vladimir Ranisavljević - bass guitar
- Vladimir Đedović - keyboards
- Mića Kovačević - drums

=== Guest musicians ===
- Vukašin Brajić - vocals (on track 7)
- Dean Clea - vocals (on track 10)
