= Nebo je malo za sve =

Studio album by Kerber
- Released: 1983
- Recorded: July 1983
- Studio: Studio Aquarius, Belgrade
- Genre: Hard rock; heavy metal
- Length: 34:40
- Label: ZKP RTLJ
- Producer: Gordon Rowley

Kerber chronology
Nebo je malo za sve (1983)	Ratne igre (1985)

Nebo je malo za sve (transl. The Sky Is Not Big Enough for All) is the debut studio album from Serbian and Yugoslav hard rock band Kerber, released in 1983.

== Background and recording ==
Formed in Niš in 1981, Kerber spent first two years of their activity performing across Serbia and working on material for their debut album. The songs were composed by all of the members, while the lyrics were written by the band's drummer Zoran Stamenković. In May 1983, the band won the first place at Subotica Youth Festival with the song "Mezimac" ("Minion"), and in July went into the studio to record their debut album. The album was recorded during July 1983 in Aquarius Studio in Belgrade, and was produced by Gordon Rowley, bassist for the British heavy metal band Nightwing; Kerber members met Rowley while he was performing in Yugoslavia as a member of Peter Green's backing band, and after hearing the group's demo recordings, Rowley got interested in working with them. The album was mixed at Strawberry Studios in Manchester and released on ZKP RTLJ.

== Track listing ==
All tracks are written by Kerber

No.	Title	Length
1.	"Mezimac" ("Minion")	3:35
2.	"Heroji od staniola" ("Tin Foil Heroes")	4:20
3.	"Sutrašnji dan" ("Tomorrow's Day")	5:50
4.	"Samo ti (Svemu si lek)" ("Only You (Heal Everything)")	3:50
5.	"Bele utvare" ("White Apparitions")	4:10
6.	"Nebo je malo za sve" ("The Sky Is Not Big Enough for All")	3:50
7.	"Kao tvoj Kerber" ("Like Your Cerberus")	3:15
8.	"Tvoja pesma" ("Your Song")	4:20

== Personnel ==
=== Kerber ===
- Goran Šepa - vocals
- Tomislav Nikolić - guitar
- Branislav Božinović - keyboards, backing vocals
- Zoran Žikić - bass guitar, backing vocals
- Zoran Stamenković - drums

=== Additional Personnel ===
- Gordon Rowley - backing vocals (track 8), producer, mixing
- Đorđe Petrović - recording
- Ratko Ostojić - recording
- Chris Jones - mixing
- Malcolm Davis - mastering
- Slavoljub Stanković - cover design
- Sava Kostadinović - photography

== Reissue ==
The remastered version of the album was released in 2009 by PGP-RTS as a part of the Sabrana dela (Collected Works) box set.

== Reception and legacy ==
The album became an immediate success, with 10,000 copies sold during its first week out. The album brought nationwide hits "Mezimac", "Nebo je malo za sve" and "Heroji od staniola". After the album release, Kerber performed as the opening band on Uriah Heep and Ten Years After concerts in Yugoslavia.

In 2011, the song "Mezimac" was polled by the listeners of Radio 202 as one of 60 greatest songs released by PGP-RTB/PGP-RTS during the sixty years of the label's existence.

The list of 100 Greatest Yugoslav Hard & Heavy Anthems published by web magazine Balkanrock in 2021 features six songs from the album: "Mezimac" (ranked 9th) "Nebo je malo za sve" (ranked 17th), "Bele utvare" (ranked 29th), "Kao tvoj Kerber" (ranked 45th), "Samo ti (Svemu si lek)" (ranked 59th) and "Heroji od staniola" (ranked 71st).

== Covers ==
- Serbian progressive/power metal band Alogia released a cover of "Mezimac", as well as a cover of "Hajde da se volimo" ("Let's Make Love") from Kerber's 1986 album Seobe (Migrations), on their 2006 live album Priče o vremenu i životu – Live at SKC (Tales of Time and Life – Live at SKC). Goran Šepa made a guest appearance on the songs.
