= Zapis (album) =

1996 studio album by Kerber

Studio album by Kerber
- Released: 1996
- Recorded: October–December 1995
- Studio: PGP-RTS Studio V, Belgrade
- Genre: Rock; hard rock
- Length: 45:03
- Label: PGP-RTS
- Producer: Vladimir Negovanović

Kerber chronology
Peta strana sveta (1990)	Zapis (1996)	Unplugged (1998)

Zapis (transl. Zapis, lit. inscription) is the sixth studio album by Serbian and Yugoslav hard rock band Kerber, released in 1996.

== Background and recording ==
Zapis was recorded after the hiatus in the band's work caused by the outbreak of the Yugoslav Wars. It was recorded from October to December 1995 in PGP-RTS Studio V and produced by Vladimir Negovanović. All the album lyrics were written by the band's old associate Duško Arsenijević, Zapis being Kerber's second album to feature all the lyrics written by him, the first one being the band's fourth studio album, Ljudi i bogovi (Humans and Gods). The album was recorded with three new members, bass guitarist Saša Vasković (who came in as the replacement for Branko Isaković), acoustic guitar player Vladan Stanojević and percussionist Goran Đorđević. For the first time in the band's career, the lineup included acoustic guitar and percussion, and instead of Božinović's trademark synthesizer sound, most of the songs featured him playing Hammond organ. Van Gogh frontman Zvonimir Đukić "Đule" made a guest appearance on the album, playing guitar. The album also featured guest appearances by bass guitarists Nenad Stefanović "Japanac", Slaviša Pavlović and the band's former member Branko Isaković. The album artwork was created by Marija Nikolić-manikdesign.

Unlike Kerber's previous albums, Zapis was released on audio cassette only on its initial run. However, promotional LP records were sent to radio stations in late 1995, but, due to the limitations of the vinyl format, the tracks "Šta mogu pesme" ("What Songs Can Do") and "Pronađi mesto" ("Find a Place") were left off. Zapis was released on CD for the first time in 2009, as a part of the Sabrana dela (Collected Works) box set.

== Track listing ==
All lyrics are written by Duško Arsenijević; all music is composed by Kerber.

No.	Title	Length
1.	"Medena" ("Honey Girl")	4:30
2.	"Sanjam" ("I'm Dreaming")	4:15
3.	"Poslednja" ("The Last One")	4:30
4.	"Vodi me" ("Take Me")	6:50
5.	"Šta mogu pesme" ("What Songs Can Do")	4:30
6.	"Čudna stvar" ("Strange Thing")	4:50
7.	"Osvani" ("Stay until Dawn")	5:10
8.	"Abrakadabra" ("Abracadabra")	4:50
9.	"Luka"	4:20
10.	"Pronađi mesto" ("Find a Place")	6:00

== Personnel ==
- Goran Šepa – vocals
- Tomislav Nikolić – guitar
- Branislav Božinović – keyboard
- Saša Vasković – bass guitar
- Josip Hartl – drums
- Vladimir Stanojević – acoustic guitar
- Goran Đorđević – percussion

=== Additional personnel ===
- Zvonimir Đukić - guitar
- Branko Isaković - bass guitar
- Nenad Stefanović - bass guitar
- Slaviša Pavlović - bass guitar
- Marina Popović - backing vocals
- Vladimir Negovanović - producer, guitar
- Goran Šimpraga - recorded by
- Marija Nikolic-manikdesign - artwork
- Dušan Mitić - photography
