= Loš i mlad =

Studio album by Bulevar
- Released: 1981
- Recorded: 1981, PGP RTB studio 5, Belgrade
- Genre: New wave, punk rock, symphonic rock
- Length: 35:18
- Label: PGP RTB; 2320126
- Producer: Bulevar

Bulevar chronology
Loš i mlad (1981)	Mala noćna panika (1982)

Loš i mlad (Bad and young) is the first studio album by the Serbian new wave band Bulevar, released by PGP RTB in 1981. The album was remastered and released on CD in 2006 on the compilation album Nestašni dečaci by PGP RTS, the successor of PGP RTB.

== Track listing ==
No.	Title	Length
1.	"Loš i mlad" (Bad and young)	3:40
2.	"Vesele devojčice" (Cheerful girls)	3:35
3.	"Kad smo na putu" (When we are on the road)	2:51
4.	"Lepo je biti s tobom" (It's nice being with you)	3:05
5.	"Rano jutro" (Early morning)	3:22
6.	"Evropa" (Europe)	2:58
7.	"Meni treba nešto vruće" (I need something hot)	4:02
8.	"Bane Brk" (Bane The Whisker)	3:39
9.	"Da li je to čudo" (Is it a miracle)	4:41
10.	"Gasim TV i odlazim" (I'm turning the TV off and leaving)	4:07

== Personnel ==
=== Bulevar ===
- Nenad Stamatović — guitar, arranged by (tracks 1, 2 and 9), music by (tracks 1, 2, 4, 9 and 10)
- Predrag Jakovljević — drums, arranged by (track 10)
- Dejan Cukić — vocals, lyrics by (tracks 3, 6, 7 and 8), music by (track 3), arranged by (track 4)
- Branko Isaković — bass, arranged by (track 6)
- Dragan Mitrić — keyboards, arranged by (tracks 7 and 8), music by (tracks 5, 6, 7 and 8), lyrics by (track 4 and 5)

=== Additional personnel ===
- Jugoslav Vlahović — artwork by [design], photography
- Bebi Dol — backing vocals
- Marina Tucaković — lyrics by (tracks 1, 2, 4 and 9)
- Vita Blažić — photography
- Tahir Durkalić — recorded by
- Momčilo Bajagić — lyrics by (track 2)
- Oliver Mandić — backing vocals (track 8)
