= From the Wrong Side of the Aperture =

Studio album by Draconic
- Released: April 3, 2009
- Recorded: Chainroom Studio, Senta, Serbia
- Genre: Progressive metal Industrial metal Symphonic black metal
- Length: 50:38
- Label: Noisehead Records
- Producer: Nikola Mijić; Marjan Mijić; Draconic

Draconic chronology
Conflux (2004)	From the Wrong Side of the Aperture (2009)

From the Wrong Side of the Aperture is the second studio album of the Serbian metal band Draconic. The album was recorded in 2008, and released in 2009 through Austrian label Noisehead Records. The album marked the band's shift from symphonic black metal towards progressive metal.

Professional ratings
Review scores
Source	Rating
Stormbringer	link
Popboks	link
Metal Monday	(favorable) link^{[usurped]}
Trablmejker	4/5 stars

== Track listing ==
All songs written and performed by Draconic.

1. "Through Escape" - 5:34
2. "Opaque" - 5:20
3. "The Amnesia Transmissions" - 4:27
4. "This Time There Would be No Witnesses" - 4:42
5. "Bleak Future Trauma" - 2:09
6. "The Imbecile" - 7:23
7. "Murder The Distance" - 4:11
8. "Of the Pulse and the Iris" - 5:11
9. "Laudanum" - 12:04

== Reception ==
The album was generally well received by the Serbian reviewers. Vladimir Ninčić of Popboks stated that From the Wrong Side of the Aperture presents Serbia's first world-class metal record. On the other hand, German Stormbringer gave this album 2.5/5 stars, praising the band's technicality and will to successfully break through the autistic Serbian metal scene, but criticized the band with the statement that the album was not a unique piece of metal, musically speaking.

== Personnel ==
- David Lazar Galić - bass guitar, vocals
- Miloš "MC Mike" Kovačević - drums
- Branislav Stanković - keyboards, vocals
- Marjan Mijić - vocals, recording, producer
- Uroš Andrijašević - guitar
- Vanja Dušan Andrijašević - guitar

=== Additional personnel ===
- Nikola Mijić - recording, producer
- Marko Galić - keyboards (on "Of the Pulse and the Iris")
- Valter Cijan - album art
