= Mala noćna panika =

Studio album by Bulevar
- Released: 1982
- Recorded: 1982, PGP RTB studio 5, Radio Belgrade studio 6, Belgrade
- Genre: New wave, punk rock, symphonic rock
- Length: 35:37
- Label: PGP RTB; 2120976
- Producer: Kornelije Kovač

Bulevar chronology
Loš i mlad (1981)	Mala noćna panika (1982)	Nestašni dečaci (2008)

Mala noćna panika (Little Night Panic) is the second and final studio album by the Serbian new wave band Bulevar, released by PGP RTB in 1982. The album was remastered and released on CD in 2008 on the compilation album Nestašni dečaci by PGP RTS, the successor of PGP RTB.

== Track listing ==
No.	Title	Length
1.	"Unutarnja panika" (Inner panic)	3:58
2.	"Bolje da ostaneš s mamom" (You better stay with mommy)	3:43
3.	"Zavedi me, pa me šutni" (Seduce me, then dump me)	3:24
4.	"Ponovo na ulici" (Back on the street)	4:00
5.	"Čekajući Godoa" (Waiting for Godot)	3:11
6.	"Opijum i Coca-Cola" (Opium and Coca-Cola)	2:58
7.	"Venerin Breg" (Mons pubis)	2:54
8.	"Bilo šta za dan dva" (Anything for a day or two)	3:48
9.	"Pušten s lanca" (Let loose)	2:55
10.	"Trenutni Lek" (Immediate remedy)	3:36

== Personnel ==
=== Bulevar ===
- Dejan Cukić — vocals, backing vocals, music by (track 1, 5), lyrics by (track 1, 4, 5), arranged by (track 9)
- Branko Isaković — bass,
- Nenad Stamatović — guitar, backing vocals, music by (tracks 2, 3, 5, 7, 9, 10)
- Predrag Jakovljević — drums,
- Dragan Mitrić — keyboards, music by (track 5, 8), lyrics by (track 8)

=== Additional personnel ===
- Jugoslav Vlahović — artwork by [design]
- Zoran Konjević — backing vocals
- Kornelije Kovač — producer, backing vocals
- Marina Tucaković — lyrics by (tracks: 2, 3, 5, 9, 9, 10)
- Rade Ercegovac — recorded by [vocals]
- Tahir Durkalić — recorded by
