= Vreme brutalnih dobronamernika =

Compilation album by Various artists
- Released: 2010
- Genres: Gothic metal, doom metal, thrash metal, industrial metal, rapcore, hard rock, post-grunge, rock, blues rock, heavy metal, progressive metal
- Length: 74:12
- Label: Milan B. Popović self-released
- Producer: Various

Professional ratings
Review scores
Source	Rating
Balkanrock	5/5 stars
Cmar-net	(favorable)
Dobre Vibracije	7/10 stars
Metal Serbia	5/5 stars
Mikrofonija	(mixed)
Mulj.net	(favorable)
Muzika.hr	3/5 stars
Popboks	5/10 stars
RiRock.com	(favorable)
RockSerbia	(favorable)
Serbian-metal.org	(favorable)
SoundGuardian	2/5 stars
Terapija.net	7/10 stars

Vreme brutalnih dobronamernika (trans. Time of Brutal Well-Intentioned People) is a compilation album released in 2010, featuring 17 Serbian (mostly metal) bands, which recorded the songs on the lyrics written by Serbian poet Milan B. Popović.

The album cover was designed by graphic artist Jakša Vlahović. Vlahović is also a member of the band Abonos, which appeared on the compilation.

== Track listing ==
Vreme brutalnih dobronamernika
No.	Title	Performer	Length
1.	"Urlik" ("Howle")	Abonos	6:47
2.	"Prah" ("Dust")	Tales Of Dark...	4:56
3.	"Povezuješ niti" ("You Connect the Threads")	Seraphim	5:13
4.	"Zarđao vek" ("Rusted Century")	Backbone	4:36
5.	"Izdaja (Ja bih da odmorim dušu)" ("Betrayal (I Would Like to Rest My Soul")	Alogia & Sweety	3:50
6.	"Polusvet" ("Demimonde")	Iskaz	4:24
7.	"Pokrov iznad mene" ("Shroud above Me")	Disparador	4:40
8.	"Umiriti dan" ("To Soothe the Day")	Darkshines	3:16
9.	"Dok me pogledom streljaš" ("While You Shoot Me with Your Eyes")	Art Diler	3:16
10.	"Talasi" ("Waves")	Atlantida	4:00
11.	"Živite li?" ("Are You Living?")	Amarath	5:47
12.	"Umiri me" ("Calm Me")	A.R. Club	3:47
13.	"Čekam" ("I'm Waiting")	Broken Strings	2:45
14.	"Ponos" ("Pride")	Instant Karma	3:06
15.	"Oprost" ("Absolution")	Asphalt Chant	4:24
16.	"Sunca kap" ("Drop of Sun")	Demether	4:10
17.	"Dva" ("Two")	Heaven Rain	4:40
