= Nestašni dečaci =

Compilation album by Bulevar
- Released: 2008
- Recorded: 1981, PGP RTB studio 5; 1982, PGP RTB studio 5, Radio Belgrade studio 6, Belgrade
- Genre: New wave, punk rock, symphonic rock
- Length: 77:27
- Label: PGP-RTS; CD 416989
- Producer: Bulevar, Kornelije Kovač

Bulevar chronology
Mala noćna panika (1982)	Nestašni dečaci (2008)

Nestašni dečaci (Wild boys) is a compilation album by Serbian new wave band Bulevar, released by PGP RTS in 2008 as a part of the PGP RTS Retrologija series. The album consists of the remastered versions of the band second single, "Nestašni dečaci" ("Wild boys"), and both studio albums, Loš i mlad (Bad and young) and Mala noćna panika (A little night panic).

== Track listing ==
=== "Nestašni dečaci" ===
No.	Title	Length
1.	"Nestašni dečaci" (Wild boys)	3:27
2.	"Moja lova, tvoja lova" (My money, your money)	3:05

=== Loš i mlad ===
No.	Title	Length
3.	"Loš i mlad" (Bad and young)	3:40
4.	"Vesele devojčice" (Cheerful girls)	3:35
5.	"Kad smo na putu" (When we are on the road)	2:51
6.	"Lepo je biti s tobom" (It's nice being with you)	3:05
7.	"Rano jutro" (Early morning)	3:22
8.	"Evropa" (Europe)	2:58
9.	"Meni treba nešto vruće" (I need something hot)	4:02
10.	"Bane Brk" (Bane The Whisker)	3:39
11.	"Da li je to čudo" (Is it a miracle)	4:41
12.	"Gasim TV i odlazim" (I'm turning the TV off and leaving)	4:07

=== Mala noćna panika ===
No.	Title	Length
13.	"Unutarnja panika" (Inner panic)	3:58
14.	"Bolje da ostaneš s mamom" (You better stay with mommy)	3:43
15.	"Zavedi me, pa me šutni" (Seduce me, then dump me)	3:24
16.	"Ponovo na ulici" (Back on the street)	4:00
17.	"Čekajući Godoa" (Waiting for Godot)	3:11
18.	"Opijum i Coca-Cola" (Opium and Coca-Cola)	2:58
19.	"Venerin Breg" (The berg of Venus)	2:54
20.	"Bilo šta za dan dva" (Anything for a day or two)	3:48
21.	"Pušten s lanca" (Let loose)	2:55
22.	"Trenutni Lek" (Immediate remedy)	3:36

== Notes ==
- Tracks 1 and 2 released on the "Nestašni dečaci" single, released by PGP RTB in 1980.
- Tracks 3 to 12 released on the album Loš i mlad, released by PGP RTB in 1981.
- Tracks 13 to 22 released on the album Mala noćna panika, released by PGP RTB in 1982.
