= Unplugged (Kerber album) =

- Cover of the 1999 CD release

Live album by Kerber
- Released: 1998 (Take It Or Leave It Records, CS); 1999 (Kerber, CD)
- Recorded: January 1996
- Venue: Studio M, Novi Sad
- Genre: Acoustic rock
- Length: 72:23 (1999); 78:50 (2006)
- Label: Take It Or Leave It Records
- Producer: Branislav Božinović; Jan Šaš

Kerber chronology
Zapis (1996)	Unplugged (1998)	Antologija 1983–1998 I (1998)

Unplugged is the second live album by Serbian and Yugoslav hard rock band Kerber, released in 1998. Originally released as two separate audio cassettes, the album was released on single CD in 1999.

== Recording and release ==
The album was recorded on Kerber's unplugged concert held in Studio M in Novi Sad in January 1996. The album was originally released on two separate limited edition audio cassettes on Take It or Leave It Records in 1998. They contained the tracks "Nikad ponovo" ("Never Again") and "Svet se brzo okreće" ("The World Is Turning Fast"), which did not appear on the CD releases. In 1999, 13 songs from two audio cassettes were self-released by the band on single CD. In 2006, Take It or Leave It reissued the CD with "Sutrašnji dan" ("Tomorrow's Day") as a bonus track.

Unplugged was the band's second and last album recorded with bass guitarist Saša Vasković, acoustic guitar player Vladan Stanojević and percussionist Goran Đorđević.

== Track listing ==
No.	Title	Length
1.	"Kao tvoj Kerber"	5:24
2.	"Medena"	4:31
3.	"Na raskršću"	6:07
4.	"Nebo je malo za sve"	6:07
5.	"Sam sam, sam"	5:09
6.	"Vodi me"	6:00
7.	"Kad ljubav izda"	5:26
8.	"Ratne igre"	4:56
9.	"Bolje da sam druge ljubio"	4:47
10.	"Kad prođe sve"	3:43
11.	"Mama - tata"	8:49
12.	"Čovek od meda"	5:22
13.	"Seobe"	6:32

2006 reissue bonus
No.	Title	Length
14.	"Sutrašnji dan"	5:45

== Personnel ==
- Goran Šepa - vocals
- Tomislav Nikolić - guitar
- Branislav Božinović - keyboards, producer
- Saša Vasković - bass guitar
- Josip Hartl - drums
- Vladan Stanojević - acoustic guitar
- Goran Đorđević - percussion

=== Guest musicians ===
- Jelena - backing vocals, flute
- Vesna - backing vocals
- Emir - violin
- Arabela - violin
- Alma - violin
- Nikola - violin
- Silvija - viola
- Jelena - cello
- Marija - flute
- Jan Šaš - producer
