= Unplugged Live Sava Centar =

Box set by Kerber
- Released: 2018
- Recorded: 12 December 2017
- Venue: Sava Centar, Belgrade
- Genre: Acoustic rock; hard rock; arena rock
- Label: PGP-RTS

Kerber chronology
Sabrana dela (2009)	Unplugged Live Sava Centar (2018)

Unplugged Live Sava Centar is a box set from Serbian and Yugoslav hard rock band Kerber, released in 2018. Unplugged Live Sava Centar features video and audio version of the unplugged concert the band held on 12 December 2017 in Belgrade's Sava Centar.

Unplugged Live Sava Centar is the band's first release recorded with guitarist Nebojša Minić. It is the band's first release to feature the songs "Ne govori" ("Don't Speak") and "Pepeo i prah" ("Ashes and Dust"), which have not appeared on any of the band's studio releases.

== DVD ==
=== Disc 1 ===
No.	Title	Length
1.	"Kao tvoj Kerber"
2.	"Medena"
3.	"Nebo je malo za sve"
4.	"Kad ljubav izda (Svetlana)"
5.	"Bolje da sam druge ljubio"
6.	"Ne govori"
7.	"Vodi me"
8.	"Svet se brzo okreće"
9.	"Sam sam sam"
10.	"Na raskršću"

=== Disc 2 ===
No.	Title	Length
11.	"Kad prođe sve"
12.	"Pepeo i prah"
13.	"Hajde da se volimo"
14.	"Između jave i sna"
15.	"Poslednja"
16.	"Čovek od meda"
17.	"Ratne igre"
18.	"Seobe"
19.	"Mama tata"
20.	"Nikad ponovo"
21.	"Pronađi mesto (Zapis)"

== CD ==
No.	Title	Length
1.	"Kao tvoj Kerber"
2.	"Medena"
3.	"Nebo je malo za sve"
4.	"Kad ljubav izda (Svetlana)"
5.	"Bolje da sam druge ljubio"
6.	"Vodi me"
7.	"Svet se brzo okreće"
8.	"Kad prođe sve"
9.	"Pepeo i prah"
10.	"Hajde da se volimo"
11.	"Između jave i sna"
12.	"Poslednja"
13.	"Čovek od meda"
14.	"Ratne igre"
15.	"Seobe"
16.	"Mama tata"

== Personnel ==
- Goran Šepa - vocals
- Tomislav Nikolić - guitar
- Nebojša Minić - guitar
- Branislav Božinović - keyboard
- Zoran Madić - bass guitar
- Josip Hartl - drums
