= Peta strana sveta =

Studio album by Kerber
- Released: 1990
- Recorded: 1989
- Studio: PGP-RTB Studio V, Belgrade
- Genre: Hard rock; arena rock; glam metal
- Length: 40:57
- Label: PGP-RTB
- Producer: Saša Habić

Kerber chronology
121288 Uživo (1989)	Peta strana sveta (1990)	Zapis (1996)

Professional ratings
Review scores
Source	Rating
Novi Ritam	1/5 stars

Peta strana sveta (transl. Fifth Side of the World) is the fifth studio album from Serbian and Yugoslav hard rock band Kerber, released in 1990.

== Background and recording ==
Peta strana sveta was recorded in PGP-RTB Studio V and produced by Saša Habić. Most of the album lyrics were written by the band's old associate Duško Arsenijević, and part of the lyrics were written by Riblja Čorba frontman Bora Đorđević, with whom the band had previously cooperated on their third studio album, Seobe (Migrations). Đorđević wrote lyrics for two songs, co-wrote lyrics for one song with Arsenijević, and also sung backing vocals on the album recording. Several songs featured Nenad Petrović on saxophone and the song "Mama – tata" ("Mom – Dad") featured a children's choir. Peta strana sveta was the band's only album to feature a song not composed by the members of the band – the song "Ljubav je", composed by Dragoljub Ilić, keyboardist of the band Generacija 5. The album cover was designed by Zoran Stamenković, the band's original drummer.

Peta strana sveta was the band's last album recorded with drummer Dragoljub Đuričić and bass guitarist Branko Isaković. Đuričić would leave the band soon after the album recording to join his former band Leb i Sol, being replaced by Josip Hartl, and Isaković would remain with the band until their early 1990s hiatus, being replaced by Saša Vasković when the band returned to the scene in the mid-1990s.

== Track listing ==
No.	Title	Lyrics	Music	Length
1.	"Mama – Tata" ("Mom – Dad")	Duško Arsenijević	Kerber	3:39
2.	"Ana"	Duško Arsenijević	Kerber	3:31
3.	"Sam" ("Alone")	Duško Arsenjević	Kerber	4:46
4.	"Otkad te ne volim" ("Since I've Stopped Loving You")	Duško Arsenijević	Kerber	4:41
5.	"Nema ničega iza oblaka" ("There's Nothing Beyond the Clouds")	Duško Arsenijević	Kerber	3:39
6.	"Igraj sad" ("Dance Now")	Duško Arsenijević	Kerber	4:38
7.	"Nažalost" ("Unfortunately")	Bora Đorđević	Kerber	3:35
8.	"Kod Amerikanca" ("At The American")	Bora Đorđević	Kerber	4:01
9.	"Ljubav je" ("Love Is")	Bora Đorđević; Duško Arsenijević	Dragoljub Ilić	4:42
10.	"Nikad ponovo" ("Never Again")	Duško Arsenijević	Kerber	3:45

== Personnel ==
- Goran Šepa - vocals
- Tomislav Nikolić - guitar, backing vocals
- Branislav Božinović - keyboard, backing vocals
- Branko Isaković - bass guitar, acoustic guitar, backing vocals
- Dragoljub Đuričić - drums

=== Additional personnel ===
- Nenad Petrović - saxophone
- Bora Đorđević - backing vocals
- Marijana Popović - backing vocals
- Vesna Popović - backing vocals
- Children's choir Družionica Maštaonica (on track 1)
- Saša Habić - producer, recorded by, backing vocals
- Zoran Vukčević - recorded by
- Kamenko Pajić - photography
- Michael Waschak - photography

== Legacy ==
In 2021, the song "Igraj sad" was ranked 5th on the list of 100 Greatest Yugoslav Hard & Heavy Anthems published by web magazine Balkanrock.

== Covers ==
- Serbian hard rock/heavy metal band Atlantida recorded a cover of the song "Igraj sad" on their 2009 album Put u večnost (Road to Eternity).
