= 121288 Uživo =

Live album by Kerber
- Released: 1989
- Recorded: 12 December 1988
- Venue: Belgrade Youth Center
- Genre: Hard rock; arena rock
- Length: 46:20
- Label: PGP-RTB
- Producer: Kerber

Kerber chronology
| Ljudi i bogovi (1988) | 121288 Uživo (1989) | Peta strana sveta (1990) |

121288 Uživo (transl. 121288 Live) is the first live album by Serbian and Yugoslav hard rock band Kerber, released in 1989.

== Recording ==
The album was recorded on Kerber concert in Belgrade Youth Center held on 12 December 1988 (thus 121288 in the album title) and produced by the band themselves. The concert was part of the promotional tour for the band's fourth studio album, Ljudi i bogovi (Humans and gods). 121288 Uživo was the band's first album recorded with bass guitarist Branko Isaković, who came to the band as the replacement for the band's original bass guitarist Zoran Žikić.

== Track listing ==
| No. | Title | Length |
|---|---|---|
| 1. | "Svet se brzo okreće" | 4:22 |
| 2. | "Od srca daleko" | 3:50 |
| 3. | "Babaroga" | 4:10 |
| 4. | "Na raskršću" | 6:50 |
| 5. | "Bolje da sam druge ljubio" | 3:45 |
| 6. | "Nebo je malo za sve" | 5:10 |
| 7. | "Kad ljubav izda" | 4:20 |
| 8. | "Ratne igre" | 4:10 |
| 9. | "Seobe" | 4:25 |
| 10. | "Hajde da se volimo" | 4:00 |

== Personnel ==
- Goran Šepa – vocals
- Tomislav Nikolić – guitar
- Branislav Božinović – keyboard
- Branko Isaković – bass guitar
- Dragoljub Đuričić – drums

=== Additional personnel ===
- Dražen Sužnjević - recorded by
- Dragan Vukićević - mixed by

== Reception ==
The album was hastily recorded and mixed, and as a result not well received by fans and music critics.
