= Velika Popina =

Velika Popina Велика Попина (Serbian)
- Village
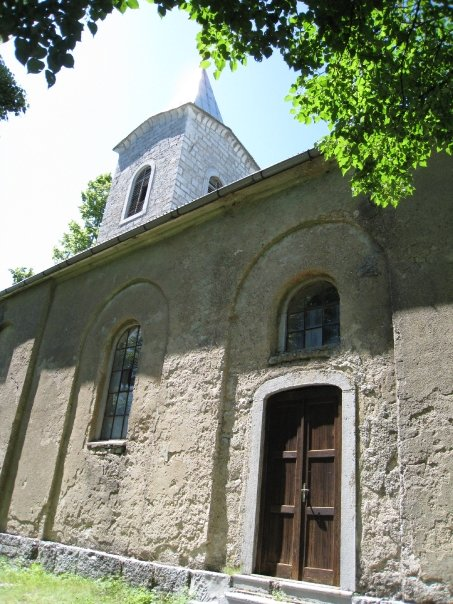
- The Saint Ilija Serbian Orthodox Church in Velika Popina

- Location within Croatia
- Coordinates: 44°17′16″N 16°01′57″E
- Country: Croatia
- County: Zadar
- Municipality: Gračac

Area
  - Total: 19.4 sq mi (50.2 km^{2})

Population (2021)
  - Total: 42
  - Density: 2.2/sq mi (0.84/km^{2})
- Time zone: UTC+1 (CET)
  - Summer (DST): UTC+2 (CEST)
- Postal code: 23442 Otrić

Velika Popina (Serbian Cyrillic: Велика Попина) is a village in Croatia. The settlement is administered as a part of Gračac municipality, Zadar County.

== Climate ==
Between 1981 and 1991, the highest temperature recorded at the local weather station was 33.6 °C (92.5 °F), on 3 August 1981. The coldest temperature was −17.6 °C (0.3 °F), on 13 February 1985.

== Population/Demographics ==
According to national census of 2011, population of the settlement is 71. The majority of the population are Serbs. This represents 20.17% of its pre-war population according to the 1991 census.

The 1991 census recorded that 95.17% of the village population were ethnic Serbs (335/352), 0.28% were Yugoslavs (1/352) while 4.54% were unknown (16/352).

Historical population 1857-2011
v

population	1178	1586	1137	1218	1385	1373	1552	1518	1144	1074	921	710	435	352	53	71
	1857	1869	1880	1890	1900	1910	1921	1931	1948	1953	1961	1971	1981	1991	2001	2011

Sources: Croatian Bureau of Statistics publications
