= Alogia (band) =

Serbian power, progressive metal band

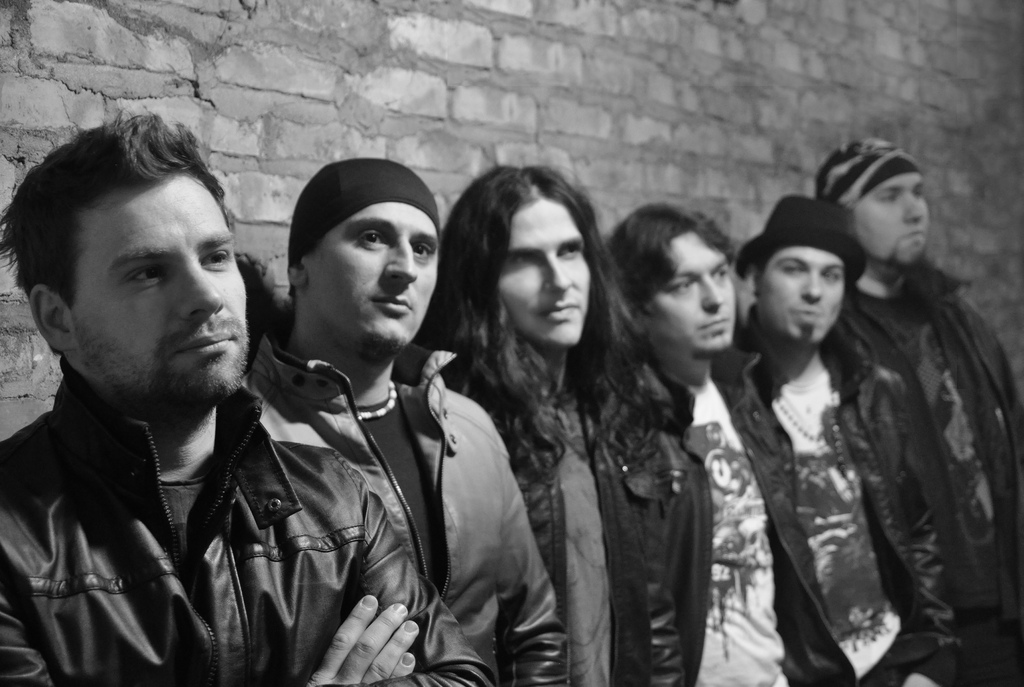
- Alogia in 2011

Background information
- Origin: Smederevo, Serbia
- Genres: Power metal, progressive metal, hard rock
- Years active: 2000–present
- Labels: One Records, Locomotive Music
- Members: Nikola Mijić; Srđan Branković; Miroslav Branković; Vladimir Đedović; Vladimir Ranisavljević; Srđan Golubica
- Past members: Ivica Lauš; Ivan Vasić; Branislav Dabić; Damir Adžić; Mića Kovačević
- Website: www.alogia.rs

Alogia is a Serbian heavy metal band from Smederevo.

== History ==
Alogia was formed in 2000 by brothers Miroslav and Srđan Branković (guitars). The rest of lineup consisted of Damir Adžić (drums), Ivan Vasić (bass guitar) and Branislav Dabić (keyboards). During the year 2001, singers Ivica Lauš and Nikola Mijić, winners of the Radio Television of Serbia's singing contest 3K Dur, joined the band. Alogia's first album, Priče o vremenu (Tales of Time), was released in February 2002 through One Records. After the album was released, another keyboard player, Vladimir Đedović, joined the band.

During the year 2003, Alogia went on hiatus, due to Vasić's, and Branković brothers' mandatory army stint. In 2004, the band began recording their second album. In August 2004, Alogia signed foreign contract with the record label Locomotive Music. In September 2004, the band released their second album, entitled Priče o životu (Tales of Life), through One Records.

In 2005, Alogia released Secret Spheres of Art for the foreign market. The album consisted of the English language versions of the songs from their first album. In 2006, the band released the live album Priče o vremenu i životu – Live at SKC. Album featured musicians from some of the most notable Yugoslav hard rock bands as guests: Divlje Jagode guitarist Sead Lipovača, Riblja Čorba guitarist Vidoja Božinović and drummer Vicko Milatović, Kerber vocalist Goran Šepa, and Osvajači guitarist Dragan Urošević. On 6 March 2006, Alogia performed as the opening band on Apocalyptica concert in Belgrade's SKC, and on 30 July 2006, alongside Kraljevski Apartman, as an opening act on Whitesnake concert on Belgrade's Tašmajdan Stadium.

In 2010, the band appeared on the various artists album Vreme brutalnih dobronamernika, which featured seventeen bands which recorded the songs on poems of Serbian poet Milan B. Popović. Alogia participated with the song "Izdaja (Ja bih da odmorim dušu)" ("Betrayal (I Would Like to Rest My Soul"), which they recorded with singer and guitarist Slađana Milošević, who was credited on the album as Sweety.

On 4 March 2012, the band released their fourth studio album Priče o snovima (Tales of Dreams). The album featured two new members: Vladimir Ranisavljević (bass guitar) and Mića Kovačević (drums). The album featured guest appearances by Vukašin Brajić, on the song "Od svega umoran" ("Tired of Everything"), and Osmi Putnik vocalist Dean Clea, on the song "Naša istina" ("Our Truth"). With Priče o snovima the band turned towards softer, melodic hard rock-oriented sound. The band's new sound saw mostly negative reactions by the fans.

In September 2014, the band released the album Elegia Balcanica. The album, announced by the singles "Elegia Balcanica", released in October 2013, and "Vreme je" ("It Is Time"), released in January 2014, marked the band's return to progressive/power metal sound.

In January 2017, the band recorded the song "Visantia" ("Byzantium") with vocalist Fabio Lione, announcing their upcoming studio album.

== Discography ==
=== Studio albums ===
- Priče o vremenu (2002)
- Priče o životu (2004)
- Secret Spheres of Art (2005)
- Priče o snovima (2012)
- Elegia Balcanica (2014)
- Semendria (2020)

=== Live albums ===
- Priče o vremenu i životu – Live at SKC (2006)
- Live and loud with Orchestra

(2018)

=== Video albums ===
- Priče o vremenu i životu (2007)

=== Other appearances ===
- "Izdaja (Ja bih da odmorim dušu)" (with Slađana Milošević; Vreme brutalnih dobronamernika; 2010)
