= Ratne igre =

Studio album by Kerber
- Released: 14 March 1985
- Recorded: December 1984
- Venue: Warehouse, Liverpool
- Studio: Studio One, Saughall, Chester
- Genre: Hard rock; arena rock
- Length: 33:22
- Label: ZKP RTLJ
- Producer: Gordon Rowley

Kerber chronology
Nebo je malo za sve (1983)	Ratne igre (1985)	Seobe (1986)

Ratne igre (transl. War Games) is the second studio album from Serbian and Yugoslav hard rock band Kerber, released in 1985.

== Background and recording ==
Following the success of their 1983 debut album, Nebo je malo za sve (The Sky Is Not Big Enough for All) and the follow up tour, in December 1984, Kerber traveled to Great Britain to record their second album. The album, entitled Ratne igre and featuring slightly more commercial sound than the band's first album, was recorded in Saughall, Chester and was, like the band's debut, produced by Gordon Rowley, bass guitarist of the British heavy metal band Nightwing. The album cover was designed by Nightwing guitarist Glynn Porrino. While the lyrics for the songs on the first album were written by the band's drummer, Zoran Stamenković (although all the songs were credited simply to Kerber), lyrics for two songs on Ratne igre were written by lyricist Duško Arsenijević, with whom the band would continue to cooperate on their future releases. The first verse of the song "Šta ostaje" ("What's Left") was taken from a poem by Jacques Prévert. During their staying in Britain, Kerber performed in clubs in Chester and Liverpool. An English language version of the song "Mezimac" ("Minion"), originally published on their debut album, with lyrics written by Rowley and entitled "Get Me Out", was recorded on 13 December at the band's concert in Liverpool's Warehouse and included on the album.

== Track listing ==
All music is composed by Kerber.

No.	Title	Lyrics	Length
1.	"Ratne igre" ("War Games")	Kerber	3:36
2.	"Babaroga" ("Babaroga")	Duško Arsenijević	3:33
3.	"Mesečar" ("Sleepwalker")	Kerber	3:42
4.	"Zauvek slobodna" ("Forever Free")	Kerber	4:00
5.	"Dođi" ("Come")	Kerber	3:34
6.	"Hteo bih..." ("I Wish...")	Duško Arsenijević	3:29
7.	"Šta ostaje" ("What's Left")	Kerber; Jacques Prévert	3:57
8.	"Vreme za uspomene" ("Time for Memories")	Kerber	3:17
9.	"Get Me Out"	Gordon Rowley	4:10

== Personnel ==
- Goran Šepa - vocals
- Tomislav Nikolić - guitar
- Branislav Božinović - keyboards
- Zoran Žikić - bass guitar
- Zoran Stamenković - drums

=== Additional personnel ===
- Gordon Rowley - producer, recorded by
- Paul Winstone - recorded by
- Tony Walsh - recorded by
- Malcolm Davis - mastered by
- Glynn Porrino - cover design

== Reception and legacy ==
The album was released in March 1985 and was well received, with the title track becoming a nationwide hit. On 15 June 1985, Kerber, alongside 23 other acts, performed on the Red Star Stadium, on the concert which was a part of YU Rock Misija, a Yugoslav contribution to Live Aid, and in November of the same year they were awarded with Smeli Cvet (Courageous Flower) award, given by the League of Communist Youth of Serbia for contribution to rock music.

In 2021, the title track was ranked 34th on the list of 100 Greatest Yugoslav Hard & Heavy Anthems published by web magazine Balkanrock.

In 2015, Ratne igre album cover was ranked 91st on the list of 100 Greatest Album Covers of Yugoslav Rock published by Balkanrock.
