= Svi marš na ples! =

Compilation album by Various Artists
- Released: 1981
- Genre: New wave, punk rock, ska, reggae, rock, pop
- Label: Jugoton

Svi marš na ples! (meaning in Serbo-Croatian language: Everybody dance now!) is a compilation album released by Jugoton in 1981 in SFR Yugoslavia.

The compilation features various pop and rock artists, mostly from the local new wave scene. At the time of their appearance on this compilation, all of the tracks have already been released on their respective bands' studio albums by the same label. Additionally, all of the bands that appear on it already achieved considerable notability and prominence. Therefore, unlike some previous Jugoton's various artists compilations that tried to affirm and highlight different up-and-coming groups, this one had a strictly commercial character.

The compilation's title is a line from the chorus of the ska song "Ha, ha, ha" by Bijelo dugme from their album Doživjeti stotu. It included the new wave groups: Šarlo akrobata with their reggae song "Ona se budi"; Idoli with their gay-themed "Retko te viđam sa devojkama"; Film with their anthem "Zamisli život u ritmu muzike za ples"; the punk rock legends Pekinška patka; Haustor with their famous reggae song "Moja prva ljubav"; Električni orgazam with a track from their initial punk phase; Azra with "Poziv na ples"; the group Zana with the classic rock & roll-inspired track "Pepito pantalone"; the band Bulevar, which featured Dejan Cukić with the song "Nestašni dečaci" written by Momčilo Bajagić- Bajaga, and others. It was rereleased on CD by Hi-Fi Centar with several bonus tracks.

The record sleeve design by Mirko Ilić features punk rock, new wave, 2 Tone and mod revival iconography.

== Track listing ==
1. Bijelo dugme - Ha, ha, ha
2. Haustor - Moja prva ljubav (My first love)
3. Zana - Pepito pantalone
4. Šarlo akrobata - Ona se budi (She's awakening)
5. Laboratorija zvuka - Skakavac joj zašo u rukavac (A grasshopper crawled up her sleeve)
6. Električni orgazam - Konobar (Waiter)
7. Film - Zamisli život u ritmu muzike za ples (Imagine life in the rhythm of dance music)
8. Idoli - Retko te viđam sa devojkama (I rarely see you with girls)
9. Azra - Poziv na ples (Dance call)
10. Aerodrom - Stavi pravu stvar na pravo mjesto (Put the right thing in the right place)
11. Bulevar - Nestašni dečaci (Naughty boys)
12. Pekinška patka - Bolje da nosim kratku kosu (It's better for me to wear short hair)

== See also ==
- Paket aranžman
- Artistička radna akcija
- Novi Punk Val
- Vrući dani i vrele noći
- New wave music in Yugoslavia
- SFR Yugoslav pop and rock scene
- Jugoton
