= Ljudi i bogovi =

Studio album by Kerber
- Released: 1988
- Recorded: 1988
- Studio: PGP RTB Studio V, Belgrade
- Genre: Hard rock; arena rock
- Length: 38:29
- Label: PGP-RTB
- Producer: Đorđe Petrović

Kerber chronology
Seobe (1986)	Ljudi i bogovi (1988)	121288 Uživo (1989)

Ljudi i bogovi (transl. Humans and Gods) is the fourth studio album from the Serbian and Yugoslav hard rock band Kerber, released in 1988.

== Background and recording ==
Ljudi i bogovi was recorded during 1988 in PGP-RTB Studio V and produced by Đorđe Petrović. After the recording of the band's previous album, Seobe (Migrations), keyboardist Branislav Božinović had to leave the band due to his mandatory stint in the Yugoslav army, and was replaced by Milorad Džmerković for the promotional tour, but by the time Ljudi i bogovi recording sessions, his army service had ended and he had rejoined the group. All of the lyrics on the album were written by the band's old associate Duško Arsenijević, Ljudi i bogovi being the band's first album with all lyrics written by him, with some of the lyrics dealing with political topics for the first time in the band's career. The album was titled after a verse from the track Manifest (Manifesto).

Ljudi i bogovi was the band's last album recorded with bass guitarist Zoran Žikić. He would leave the band in the summer of 1988, and would be replaced by Branko Isaković.

== Track listing ==
All lyrics are written by Duško Arsenijević; all music is composed by Kerber.

No.	Title	Length
1.	"Svet se brzo okreće" ("The World Is Turning Fast")	4:12
2.	"Od srca daleko" ("Far Away from the Heart")	4:29
3.	"Na raskršću" ("At the Crossroads")	4:49
4.	"Laže šarene" ("Sweet Little Lies")	4:31
5.	"Bliznakinje" ("Twin Girls")	4:27
6.	"Između jave i sna" ("Between Reality and Dream")	4:03
7.	"Deda, pradeda" ("Grandfather, Great-Grandfather")	4:12
8.	"Kad prođe sve" ("When Everything's Over")	3:43
9.	"Manifest" ("Manifesto")	4:03

== Personnel ==
- Goran Šepa - vocals
- Tomislav Nikolić - guitar
- Branislav Božinović - keyboard
- Zoran Žikić - bass guitar
- Dragoljub Đuričić - drums

=== Additional personnel ===
- Marina Popović - backing vocals
- Vesna Popović - backing vocals
- Katarina Gojković - backing vocals
- Đorđe Petrović - producer
- Vladimir Negovanović - recorded by
- Ivan Ćulum - cover design
- Gordan Škondrić - photography

== Reception and legacy ==
The album did not repeat the success of the band's previous album, which brought numerous hits. Nevertheless, the songs "Svet se brzo okreće" and the ballad "Na raskršću" became hits.

In 2021, the song "Manifest" was ranked 79th on the list of 100 Greatest Yugoslav Hard & Heavy Anthems published by web magazine Balkanrock.
