= Bulevar (band) =

Serbian and former Yugoslav new wave band

Background information
- Origin: Belgrade, Serbia, Yugoslavia
- Genres: New wave, punk rock
- Years active: 1978–1982
- Labels: Jugoton, PGP-RTB, PGP-RTS
- Past members: Dejan Cukić; Nenad Stamatović; Predrag Jakovljević; Branko Isaković; Dragan Mitrić

Bulevar (Serbian Cyrillic: Булевар; trans. Boulevard) were a Serbian and former Yugoslav new wave band from Belgrade.

== History ==
=== Band formation ===
The band history dates from the days of the group Tilt consisting of young highschool attendants Dejan Cukić (a former Dizel member, vocals), Nenad Stamatović (guitar), Dušan Bezuha (guitar), Miroslav Cvetković (bass) and drummers at different times, Vlada Golubović and Predrag Jakovljević. The band sometimes also performed with rock veteran Branko Marušić "Čutura" (guitar, vocals). Following the departures of Bezuha, Golubović, who went to Suncokret, and Cvetković, who went to Pop Mašina, the band ceased to exist.

Stamatović, who was in the band Zebra, along with Cukić, Jakovljević and Suncokret bassist Branko Isaković, formed Bulevar in 1978. The band got the name Bulevar because all of the members lived near The Boulevard Of Revolution in Belgrade. During the following year, the band had their first live appearances as an opening act for Riblja Čorba. Their first major appearance was at the Belgrade Tašmajdan Stadium on September 1, 1979, at the famous Riblja Čorba concert. After the band Zvuk Ulice disbanded, their keyboard player, Dragan Mitrić joined the band.

=== Prominence and breakup ===
The lineup began working on their new songs and, with the help of Riblja Čorba guitarist Momčilo Bajagić, the band recorded their first single "Moje bezvezne stvari" ("My Silly Stuff"). However, due to the illness of Josip Broz Tito, the band released their first single in 1980 through Jugoton. The release of their second single, "Nestašni dečaci" ("Wild Boys"), was described by Cukić as "the inauguration of symphonic punk" because the band combined punk music with arrangements of Mitrić, who was then studying composition at the Music Academy. "Nestašni dečaci" was also featured on a various artists compilation Svi marš na ples!, a cult new wave Jugoton compilation. The song caused a slight incident as the authorities considered the song the direct support of the March 1981 protests in Kosovo, which was not true.

By the time the band was about to release their debut album Loš i mlad (Bad and Young), they signed for PGP-RTB. The album was released in 1981, and was produced by themselves with the help of Tahir Durhalić. When the band released their second album, Mala noćna panika (Little Night Panic), featuring the notable tracks "Unutarnja panika" ("Inner Panic") and "Trenutni lek" ("Momentary Remedy"), Mitrić, Stamatović and Cukić went to serve the army so the record did not have a live presentation. The only appearance the band made was at the Belgrade Dok, where Kornelije Kovač, who produced the record, played keyboards. The band held their last concert in Skopje in 1982, where Stamatović appeared as a soldier, and after the performance, the band disbanded.

=== Post-breakup ===
After the band disbandment, Branko Isaković joined Propaganda and after their breakup, he joined Idoli. Jakovljević went to Divlji Anđeli, and then to Zana, Zamba, and finally Viktorija. Leaving Viktorija, he had withdrawn from the scene. When Stamatović and Mitrić returned from the army, they had a few rehearsals as Bulevar and then joined Bajaga i Instruktori where Mitrić spent a short time and dedicated himself to studying, only to return when Cukić started his solo career.

Dejan Cukić started writing for the Rock magazine. He had recorded three albums with Bajaga i Instruktori and after their Soviet Union tour formed started a successful solo career. Beside Mitrić, Isaković was also a member of Dejan Cukić's support group, the Spori Ritam Band.

During his solo career, Cukić recorded several cover versions of Bulvear songs. On the 1991 album, Cukić recorded a cover of "Nestašni dečaci", and a live version of the track appeared on the DC & SRB @ SC live album. On the San na pola puta (A Halfway Dream) compilation, beside "Nestašni dečaci", appeared a cover of "Trenutni lek". Cukić's 1998 album Igramo na ulici (Dancing in the Street) featured the track called "Bulevari" ("Boulevards").

In 2008, under the PGP-RTS label Retrologija, a compilation Nestašni dečaci was released, featuring the remastered recordings of both studio albums and the band second single.

== Legacy ==
In 2011, Serbian hard rock/heavy metal band Trigger covered the song "Trenutni lek" for their cover album EX.

== Discography ==
- Loš i mlad (1981)
- Mala noćna panika (1982)

== See also ==
- New wave music in Yugoslavia
- Punk rock in Yugoslavia
