= Goran Šepa =

Serbian rock singer (born 1958)

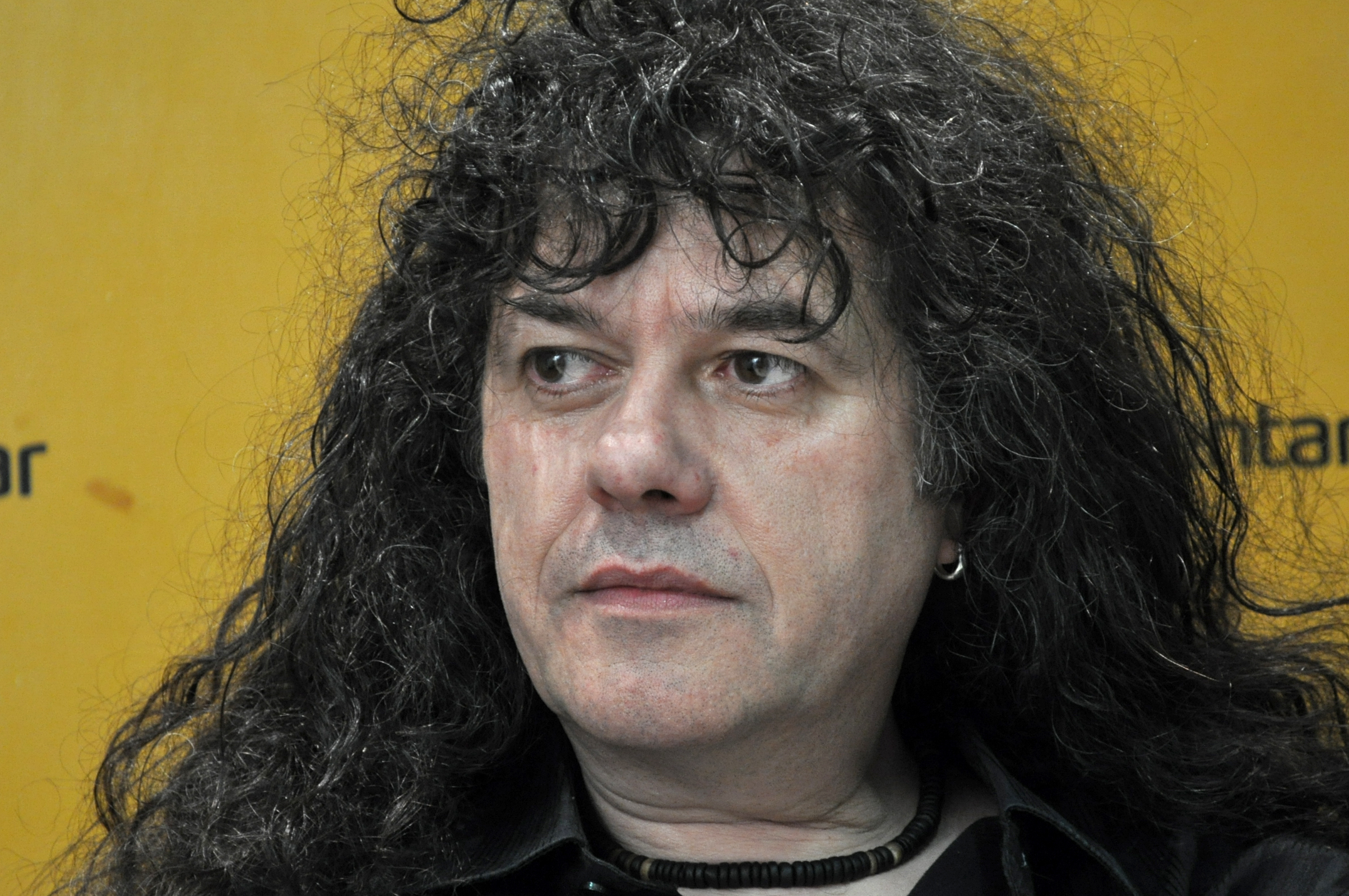
- Goran Šepa in 2011

Background information
- Also known as: Gale
- Born: 10 August 1958 (age 67); Velika Popina, PR Serbia, FPR Yugoslavia
- Origin: Niš, Serbia
- Genres: Hard rock, heavy metal, rock
- Occupations: Singer, songwriter
- Instrument: vocals
- Years active: 1980–present
- Labels: ZKP RTLJ, PGP-RTB, PGP-RTS

Goran "Gale" Šepa (Serbian Cyrillic: Горан "Гале" Шепа; born 10 August 1958) is a Serbian rock singer. He is best known as the lead singer for the Serbian and Yugoslav hard rock band Kerber. Šepa is widely known for his melodic vocal style.

== Biography ==
Šepa is a Croatian Serb, coming from the village of Velika Popina near Gračac in the region of Lika. He was born 10 August 1958.

== Discography ==
=== With Kerber ===
==== Studio albums ====
- Nebo je malo za sve (1983)
- Ratne igre (1984)
- Seobe (1986)
- Ljudi i bogovi (1988)
- Peta strana sveta (1990)
- Zapis (1996)

==== Live albums ====
- 121288 (1989)
- Unplugged (1998)
- Unplugged Live Sava Centar (2018)

==== Singles ====
- "Sveti Nikola" (2009)
- "Bestraga sve" (2021)
