= Pero Zubac =

Serbian author, screenwriter and journalist

- Перо Зубац
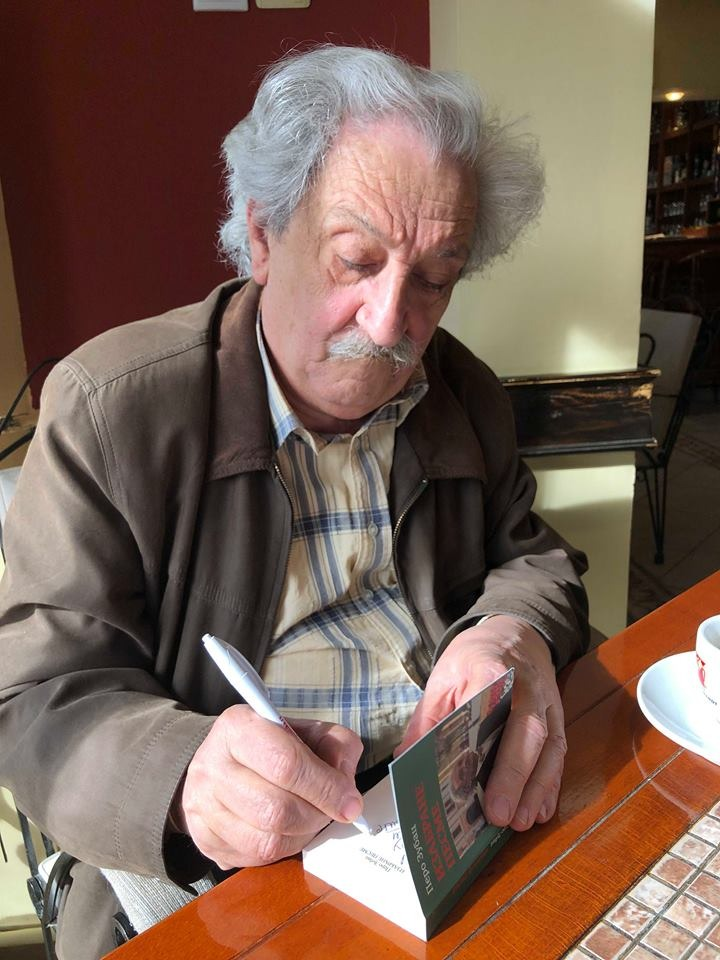
- Zubac in 2017
- Born: 30 May 1945 (age 81); Nevesinje, FS Bosnia and Herzegovina, DF Yugoslavia
- Education: University of Novi Sad
- Occupations: Writer, poet

Pero Zubac (Serbian Cyrillic: Перо Зубац; born 30 May 1945) is a Serbian and former Yugoslav author, poet, screenwriter, academic and journalist. He is a member of the Association of Journalists of Serbia and the Association of Writers of Serbia. In 2021 he was awarded the Order of Karađorđe's Star.

== Works ==
- Tišina govori o ljudima, co-author, Klub mladih pisaca, Zrenjanin, 1964.
- Nevermore, Matica srpska, Novi Sad, 1967
- Razgovori sa Gospodinom, Kulturni centar Radničkog univerziteta, Novi Sad, 1971
- Hoću: neću, Children's poetry, Opštinska zajednica kulture i Društvo književnih stvaralaca Zrenjanin, 1972.
- Triptih (co-author with M. Antić, M. Nastasijević), Opštinska zajednica kulture, Novi Sad, 1973
- Zakasnela pisma, „Stražilovo”, Novi Sad, 1973
- Mostarske kiše, Radnički univerzitet „Radivoj Ćirpanov“, Novi Sad, 1974
- Razlog blagosti. „Bratstvo-jedinstvo”, Novi Sad, 1975
- Uzmorje, Matica srpska Novi Sad, 1978
- Tito je naš drug, „Dečje novine” Gornji Milanovac, 1979
- Što se Darja na me ljuti, Children's poetry, „Jež”, Belgrade, 1979, 1980
- Neko drugi, Gradska biblioteka „Žarko Zrenjanin“, Zrenjanin, 1980
- Ljuvene, „Mostarska komuna”, Mostar, 1980
- Otvoreni san, „Minerva”, Belgrade, 1980
- San im čuva istorija, narrative poetry, Kragujevac, 1980
- Mostarske kiše i neko drugo more, „Mladost”, Zagreb, 1980, 1981
- Pisma poverljiva, Children's poetry, „Jež”, Belgrade, 1981
- Tito je naš drug, „Veselin Masleša” Sarajevo, 1982
- Ram za sliku leta, „Mladost”, Zagreb, 1983
- Vukovarski uspomenar, poema za svetilište u Dudiku, „OK SSRNH Vukovar”, 1984
- Da ne čuje neko, Children's poetry, Detinjstvo, „Dnevnik”, Novi Sad, 1984
- Dečje srce, Children's poetry, Gradska narodna biblioteka „Žarko Zrenjanin“, Zrenjanin, 1984
- Miris bejturana, „BIGZ”, Belgrade, 1984
- Pero Zubac o…, Children's poetry, Gradska biblioteka Zrenjanin, 1985
- Postoji vatra, poema za svetilište u Sremskoj Mitrovici, Sremske novine Sremska Mitrovica, 1985
- Pesmar, Znanje, Zagreb, 1986., Podešavanje čula, Forum marketprint, Novi Sad, 1988
- Duša dečja, Children's poetry, Zrinski, Čakovec, Crvena zvezda-Agencija, Belgrade, 1989
- Doba kiša. Zrinski, Čakovec, Crvena zvezda – Agencija Belgrade, 1989
- Knjiga šutnje, Zrinski Čakovec, Crvena zvezda – Agencija, Belgrade, 1989
- Kiše, „Beletra”, Belgrade, 1989
- Mostarske kiše ili žeđ za jugom, „Dnevnik”, Novi Sad, 1989
- Nokturno, Zrinski Čakovec, Crvena zvezda – Agencija, Belgrade, 1989
- Sat srca, Zrinski, Čakovec, Crvena zvezda- Agencija, Belgrade, 1989
- U modrom vrtu, Zrinski Čakovec, Crvena zvezda – Agencija, Belgrade, 1989
- A šta ću ja, Children's poetry, Dragan Laković, Saraorci, 1991
- Mostarske kiše i nove pesme, „Beletra”, Belgrade, 1993
- Porodična večera, „Unireks”, Nikšić, 1993.
- Deca rastu kao kuće, Children's poetry, „Unireks”, Podgorica, 1996
- Deca mogu nemoguće, Children's poetry, „Unireks”, Podgorica, 1996
- Budi prijatelj vetru, „Dečja literatura”, Belgrade, 1996
- Zmajevci, Children's poetry, „Slovo”, Vrbas, 1997
- Ovo sam ja, „BMG”, Belgrade, 1997
- Let iznad detinjstva, „Smederevska pesnička jesen”, Smederevo, 1998
- Ne šalji kišu, „KZ V. Mijušković”, Nikšić, „Oktoih”, Podgorica, „Libertas”, Bijelo Polje, 1999
- Ptice u grudima, Children's poetry, „Srpska knjiga” Ruma and „Nolit” Belgrade, 2001
- Tamne rime, „Čigoja”, Belgrade, 2001
- Mostarske kiše, selected poems, „Srpska knjiga”, Ruma, 2002
- Molitva za Slađanu Đorđević, „Stojkov”, Novi Sad, 2002
- Pesme iz šezdesetih, „Stylos”, Novi Sad, 2003
- Pesme iz sedamdesetih, „Stylos”, Novi Sad, 2003
- Pesme iz osamdesetih, „Stylos”, Novi Sad, 2003
- Pesme iz devedesetih, „Stylos”, Novi Sad, 2003
- Nove pesme, „Stylos”, Novi Sad, 2003
- Kako se raste, „Portal”, Belgrade, 2004
- Najlepše pesme Pera Zubca, „Prosveta” Belgrade, 2004
- Baštovite pesme, „Srpska knjiga”, Ruma, 2004
- Razlog blagosti, „Orpheus”, Novi Sad, 2005
- Povratak Mostaru, „Art Rabic”, Sarajevo, 2005
- Lijepo ponašanje, „Dis”, Čačak, 2005
- Molitvenik sna, „Instel” Novi Sad i „Srska knjiga” Ruma, 2007
- Kraljević i pesnik, novel for children, „Bookland”, Belgrade, 2007
- Povratak Mostaru (i Mostarske kiše), sa objavljenim odjecima promocija u Mostaru, Sarajevu i Banja Luci, „Media invent”, Novi Sad, 2006
- Mostarske kiše, „Žiravac”, Požega, 2007
- Mostarske kiše, „Media invent” Novi Sad i „Srpska knjiga” Ruma, 2006, 2008, 2009
- Mostarske kiše, „Admiral book”, Belgrade, 2009
- Mostarske kiše, „Media invent”, Novi Sad, 2005, 2006, 2008, 2010
- Lenka Dunđerska, lirska studija, „Media invent” Novi Sad i „Tiski cvet” Novi Sad, 2010, 2011
- Perodije, „Vuk”, Loznica, 2011
- Hor bečkih dečaka u sinagogi, „Prosveta”, Belgrade, 2012
- Mostarske kiše, edition with translation in 14 languages, „Admiral book“, Belgrade, 2015
- Pesmarica za Milenu, Children's poetry, Gradska bibioteka „Žarko Zrenjanin“, Zrenjanin, 2016
- Glasovi u tišini, pesme, „Art Rabic“, Sarajevo 2017
- Mostarske kiše, „Smederevski pesnički festival”, 2018
- Izabrane pesme, „Gramatik“ Belgrade, 2018
- Knjiga koja se još piše, 57 pesama, „Krovovi”, br. 96-100, Sremski Karlovci, 2018
- Pisma D.T. Na nebesku adresu, „Prometej” – „ Instel“, Novi Sad, 2019
- Klupko života, „Art Rabic“, Sarajevo, 2019
- Mostarske kiše i neka druga zemlja, „Art Rabic” – „Mikulić knjige”, Sarajevo, 2020

=== Anthologies ===
- 20 pripovedača, dvadeset vojvođanskih pripovedača, Društvo književnih stvaralaca Zrenjanin, 1972
- Romor ravnice, poezija pesnika Vojvodine, Centar za kulturu, Zrenjanin, 1974
- Vojvodina peva Titu, pesme o Josipu Brozu Titu vojvođanskih pesnika, „Bratstvo jedinstvo”, Novi Sad, 1977
- Slovo ljubve, Serbian love poetry, „BMG”, Belgrade, 1987
- Uzalud je budim, Serbian love poetry, „BMG”, Belgrade, 1987
- Pohvala ljubavi, Serbian love poetry, „BMG”, Belgrade, 1987
- Velika tajna, Serbian love poetry, „BMG”, Belgrade, 1987
- Pelud sveta, Serbian love poetry, „BMG”, Belgrade, 1987
- Kao da sam te sanjao, anthology of world poetry about love, Gradska biblioteka, Zrenjanin, 1988
- Ptica detinjstva, Serbian Children's poetry, „Jefimija”, Kragujevac, 1997
- Zlatni stihovi, „Verzal pres”, Belgrade, 1998
- Knjiga nežnosti, „Verzal pres”, Belgrade, 1999
- Među javom i med snom, „Srpska knjiga”, Ruma, Serbian poetry of the 19th and 20th century, 2004
- Sa one strane duge, anthology of Serbian Children's poetry, „Srpska knjiga”, Ruma, 2006
- Pod jednom drukčijom zvezdom, vojvođanski pesnici o Vojvodini, „Srpska knjiga”, Ruma, 2008
- Kad srce zasvetluca, anthology of Serbian Children's poetry, „Srpska knjiga”, Ruma, 2009
- Prirodopis, „Bookland“, Belgrade, 2013

=== Dramas ===
- Mudbol, co-author, 1968
- Izbacivač, TV drama, 1979
- Vratio se Nikoletina, co-author, 2000
- Rodino dete, „Kliker“ 2001

=== Libretto ===
- Banović Strahinja, 2001
- Lenka Dunđerska, 2001
- Milica SS, kći bregova, 2012
