= Dragoljub Đuričić =

Montenegrin musician (1953–2021)

Dragoljub Đuričić Драгољуб Ђуричић
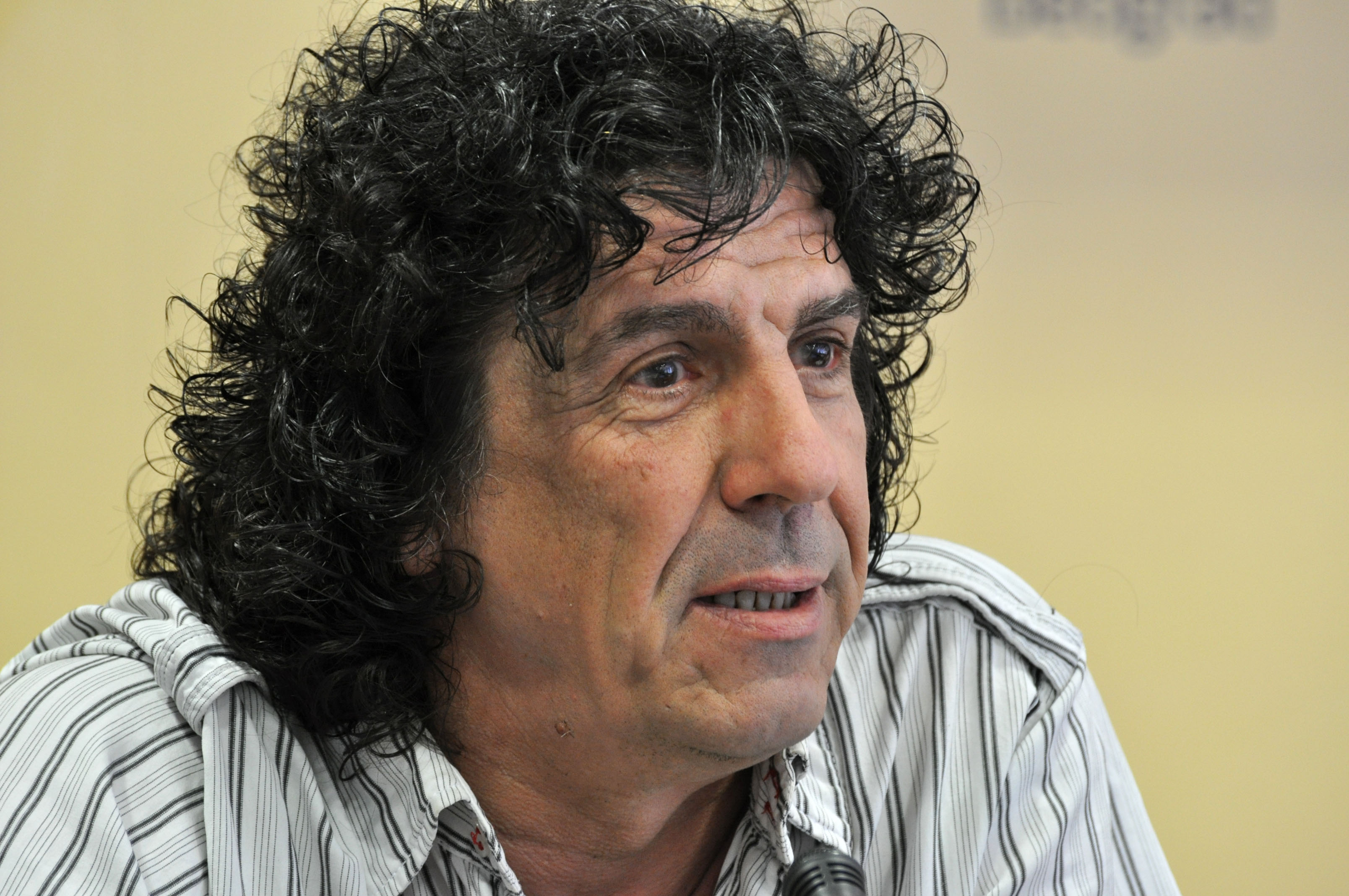
- Đuričić in 2010

Background information
- Born: 10 February 1953; Cetinje, PR Montenegro, FPR Yugoslavia
- Died: 15 March 2021 (aged 68) Belgrade, Serbia
- Genres: Traditional music; progressive rock; hard rock; folk rock; jazz fusion; instrumental rock; pop rock; jazz
- Occupations: Musician, composer
- Instrument: Drums
- Years active: Early 1970s–2021
- Labels: PGP-RTB, Jugoton, UFA Media, Atelje 212, Metropolis Records, PGP-RTS, Energia, City Records
- Website: www.dragoljubdjuricic.com

Dragoljub Đuričić (Serbian and Montenegrin Cyrillic: Драгољуб Ђуричић; 10 February 1953 – 15 March 2021) was a Serbian-Montenegrin and Yugoslav drummer.

Đuričić started his career in the early 1970s in Herceg Novi, playing in local bands. In the mid-1970s he moved to Belgrade, where he soon started to perform with pop singers. He was a member of the progressive/hard rock band YU Grupa, jazz fusion band Leb i Sol and hard rock band Kerber. He performed with pop singer Zdravko Čolić and singer-songwriter Đorđe Balašević and worked as a studio musician. He formed several drum bands, performing with them across the world. He was also known for his role in the 1996–1997 protests in Serbia, during which he led a company of drummers, and participation in the overthrow of Slobodan Milošević.

== Musical career ==
Đuričić was born in 1953 in Cetinje. He started his career performing with bands from Herceg Novi. Initially he played the guitar, and later switched to bass guitar. Eventually, as a member of the band Krune (The Crowns), he switched from bass guitar to drums. After he left Krune, he played with the bands Veritas 19 and Exodus. At the time he also practiced water polo and swimming, and won several medals on junior championships.

He made his first studio recordings as a member of the group Bokelji, with which he recorded an album with traditional songs from Dalmatia. In August 1975, he moved to Belgrade. Initially, he lived in Belgrade as a homeless man, before he established connections with Belgrade musicians gathering in the kafana Šumatovac. Soon, he started performing with Yugoslav pop singers and went on a Soviet Union tour as a member of the backing band for several pop singers. In 1976, he became a member of the band Ribeli (Rebels), which, after they were joined by the singer Dado Topić, changed their name to Mama Co Co. As a member of Mama Co Co, Đuričić performed with numerous Yugoslav pop stars; in 1978, he was a member of Zdravko Čolić's backing band on his Putujući zemljotres (Travelling Earthquake) tour.

At the end of 1978, Đuričić became a member of the progressive/hard rock band YU Grupa, with which he recorded the album Samo napred... (1979). In 1981, he moved to the jazz fusion band Leb i Sol, with which he recorded the albums Sledovanje (1982), Kalabalak (1983), Tangenta (1984), and the double live album Akustična trauma (1982), and performed in clubs across Europe and the United States. In 1982, Leb i Sol spent two and a half months on a United States tour with the KPGT theatre. The theatre performed the play Oslobođenje Skoplja (Liberation of Skopje), directed by Ljubiša Ristić, in which Đuričić played the role of Crazy Vana. In 1985, he left Leb i Sol and joined the hard rock band Kerber, with which he recorded the albums Seobe (1986), Ljudi i bogovi (1988), Peta strana sveta (1990), and the live album 121288 (1989).

During the time he spent in Kerber, Đuričić also worked with other artists. In 1986, when alternative rock musician Rambo Amadeus started his career, he and Đuričić performed live, in the lineup which featured only two of them, Đuričić on drums, and Rambo Amadeus on vocals. On these concerts Rambo Amadeus used megaphone instead of a microphone. In 1987, in Belgrade's Students Cultural Centre, Đuričić and the drummer Ivan Fece "Firchie" held a concert on which they played various covers, mostly by The Beatles, on percussion instruments. The concert was held with regard to 70 years since the October Revolution. In 1988, he played drums on Nikola Čuturilo's album 9 lakih komada, and played drums in Laki Band which Čuturilo formed to promote the album. In 1989, Đuričić played drums on Čuturilo's album Raskršće.

Đuričić returned to Leb i Sol in 1990. The recording of the band's concert in New York's CBGB was released on the live album Live in New York in 1991. During this period Đuričić also worked with singer-songwriter Đorđe Balašević, playing drums on his album Jedan od onih života..., and becoming a member of his backing band.

Đuričić participated in the 1996–1997 protests in Serbia, joining the group of young drummers which gave tempo to the marching of the protesters. At the end of 1997, he formed Dragoljub Đuričić Trio with Darkwood Dub drummer Lav Bratuša and percussionist Uroš Šećerov; on their performances they were often joined by a well-known actor and amateur drummer Bogdan Diklić. The recording of the concert by Dragoljub Đuričić Trio held on 7 February 1998 in Atelje 212 theatre was released on the live album Two Drums & Percussion. On that evening, the trio was joined on drums by Diklić, the journalist Ivan Ivačković and the painter Janoš Mesaroš. In April 1998, the band performed in Montreux, and, while playing on cookware and bakeware, they were joined by Albert, 12th Prince of Thurn and Taxis. In 1998, Đuričić and the hip hop musician Voodoo Popeye recorded the football song "Imamo iDeju" (the title being a word play, meaning both "We Have an Idea" and "We Also Have Dejo"), which was released on the compilation album Fudbalske himne 98 (Football Chants 98). During 1998, Đuričić once again played on Zdravko Čolić's tour as a member of his backing band. At the end of February 1998, Đuričić, with Šećerov, Bratuša, St. George String Orchestra, composer Zoran Erić, a choir, and twenty young drummers, held a concert in Belgrade's Sava Centar. With the performance, walking in the hall and on the stage, the performers reminded the audience of the 1996–1997 protests. At the end of 1999, Đuričić joined the group of economists G17 as a cultural adviser, and took part in the Democratic Opposition of Serbia 2000 election campaign.

After the overthrow of Slobodan Milošević, Đuričić continued to perform with the group of young drummers, opening the Theatre Spectacle in Zurich and the Summer Jazz Festival in Kumanovo. He recorded his second solo album, Ritam slobode (Rhythm of Freedom), with his Drums Company, consisting of Maša Božović, Lav Bratuša, and Ivan Dimitrijević. The album featured numerous guests: the flutist Bora Dugić, the string quartet Belotti, the violinist Dobrica Vasić, and others. On the album Đuričić presented himself as the author of eclectic material.

In 2010, Đuričić formed the drum ensemble Balkanska lavina (Balkan Avalanche), with which he performed across the Balkans.

== Sessions and other works ==
During the period he spent in Kerber, Đuričić also cooperated with rock singer Dejan Cukić, playing drums on his album Spori ritam (Slow Rhythm), pop rock band Jugosloveni, playing drums on their album Vruće osvežavajuće (Hot Refreshment), and rock musicians Nebojša Krstić and Srđan Šaper, playing drums on their album Poslednja mladost u Jugoslaviji (The Last Youth in Yugoslavia). In 1988, he participated in the recording of the jazz album Ritual by the pianist Vladimir Maričić and his Ritual Band. In 2008, he played drums on the album Partiture za koren i stablo (Sheets for the Roots and the Tree) by guitarist Vladan Vučković Paja.

He wrote music for theatre plays Zapali me (Light Me Up), Alisa u zemlji čuda (Alice in Wonderland), Anitina čarobna soba (Anita's Magic Room), Art (all four directed by Alisa Stojanović), Cyrano de Bergerac (directed by Svetislav Goncić), Reservoir Dogs (directed by Omar Abu El Rub), Policajci (Policemen, directed by Darijan Mihajlović), Djetinjarije (Kid's Stuff, directed by Dušan Petrović), Popcorn, and Bliže (Closer, co-author of the music with Koki Dimuševski). As a drummer he performed in the theatre play Kako je divan taj prizor... (What a Beautiful Sight...), directed by Ljubivoje Tadić.

Đuričić also painted, mostly nudes in pointillist manner. He illustrated the book Rubato by Vladimir Savić, and the book of poems Kuća od stakla (Glass House) by Tatjana Debeljački.

== Death ==
Đuričić died on 15 March 2021, in Belgrade from complications caused by COVID-19 during the COVID-19 pandemic in Serbia. He was 68.

== Legacy ==
Author Mirko Jakovljević wrote Đuričić's biography entitled Stubovi slobode (Pillars of Freedom), published in 2001.

== Discography ==
=== With YU grupa ===
==== Studio albums ====
- Samo napred... (1979)

==== Singles ====
- "Identitet" / "Ideš mi na nerve" (1979)

=== With Leb i Sol ===
==== Studio albums ====
- Sledovanje (1982)
- Kalabalak (1983)
- Tangenta (1982)

==== Live albums ====
- Akustična trauma (1982)
- Live in New York (1991)

=== With Kerber ===
==== Studio albums ====
- Seobe (1986)
- Ljudi i bogovi (1988)
- Peta strana sveta (1990)

==== Live albums ====
- 121288 (1989)

==== With Nikola Čuturilo ====
- 9 lakih komada (1988)
- Raskršće (1989)

=== With Đorđe Balašević ===
==== Studio albums ====
- Jedan od onih života... (1993)

=== Solo ===
==== Studio albums ====
- Ritam slobode (as Dragoljub Đuričić & the Drums Company, 2001)

==== Live albums ====
- Two Drums & Percussion (as Dragoljub Đuričić Trio, 1998)

=== With Voodoo Popeye ===
==== Singles ====
- "Imamo iDeju" (1998)

=== With Zdravko Čolić ===
==== Live albums ====
- Arena 2005 – Beogradska Arena: Uživo (2005)

=== As session musician ===
==== With Dejan Cukić ====
- Spori ritam (1987)

==== With Jugosloveni ====
- Vruće osvežavajuće (1987)

==== With Nebojša Krstić and Srđan Šaper ====
- Poslednja mladost u Jugoslaviji (1987)

=== With Vlada Maričić and The Ritual Band ===
- Ritual (1988)

=== With Vladan Vučković Paja ===
- Partiture za koren i stablo (2008)
