= Seobe =

Studio album by Kerber
- Released: 1986
- Recorded: June 1986
- Studio: PGP-RTB Studio V, Belgrade
- Genre: Hard rock; arena rock
- Length: 40:50
- Label: PGP-RTB
- Producer: Kornelije Kovač

Kerber chronology
Ratne igre (1985)	Seobe (1986)	Ljudi i bogovi (1988)

Seobe (transl. Migrations) is the third studio album by Serbian and Yugoslav hard rock band Kerber, released in 1986.

== Background and recording ==
Following the success of their first two albums, Kerber signed for Belgrade-based PGP-RTB, one of two biggest Yugoslav labels, and recorded their third studio album, Seobe. The album was recorded in PGP-RTB Studio V and produced by composer and former Korni Grupa leader Kornelije Kovač. It was the band's first album recorded with drummer Dragoljub Đuričić, who came in as the replacement for Boban Đorđević (who was himself brought in to replace the band's original drummer, Zoran Stamenković, with whom the band recorded their first two albums).

Unlike the band's previous album, which featured only two songs with lyrics written by lyricist Duško Arsenijević, most of the songs on Seobe featured lyrics written by him, with the song "Kad ljubav izda" ("When Love Betrays") featuring a quotation from Pero Zubac's poem "Mostar Rains", and the lyrics for the title track being inspired by 1980s emigrations of Serbs from Kosovo. Beside Arsenijević's lyrics, the album featured two songs with lyrics written by Riblja Čorba frotman Bora Đorđević and two songs with lyrics written by Riblja Čorba guitarist Nikola Čuturilo. Đorđević also sung lead vocals in the song "Čovek od meda" ("Man Made of Honey") together with Kerber frontman Goran Šepa.

== Track listing ==
All music is composed by Kerber.

No.	Title	Lyrics	Length
1.	"Bolje da sam druge ljubio" ("I Should Have Kissed Other Girls")	Duško Arsenijević	3:42
2.	"Blagi Bože, podigni me" ("Dear God, Lift Me Up")	Nikola Čuturilo	3:43
3.	"Kad ljubav izda" ("When Love Betrays")	Duško Arsenijević; Pero Zubac	4:15
4.	"Ne igram ruski rulet" ("I Don't Play Russian Roulette")	Duško Arsenijević	3:50
5.	"Još samo ovu noć mi daj" ("Just Give Me This One Last Night")	Nikola Čuturilo	5:15
6.	"Hajde da se volimo" ("Let's Make Love")	Duško Arsenijević	3:35
7.	"Čovek od meda" ("Man Made of Honey")	Bora Đorđević	4:42
8.	"Sa tobom ne mogu dalje" ("I Can't Go on with You")	Bora Đorđević	4:42
9.	"Beli tragovi" ("White Traces")	Duško Arsenijević	3:15
10.	"Seobe" ("Migrations")	Duško Arsenijević	3:46

== Personnel ==
- Goran Šepa - vocals
- Tomislav Nikolić - guitar
- Branislav Božinović - keyboards
- Zoran Žikić - bass guitar
- Dragoljub Đuričić - drums

=== Additional personnel ===
- Bora Đorđević - vocals (on track 7)
- Kornelije Kovač - producer
- Tahir Duraklić - recorded by
- Gordan Škondrić - cover design, photography

== Reception and legacy ==
The album was a commercial success, with a number of songs becoming hits: "Hajde da se volimo", "Čovek od meda", power ballads "Kad ljubav izda", "Još samo ovu noć mi daj", "Bolje da sam druge ljubio" and "Seobe", Following the success of the album, Kerber performed more than 200 concerts across Yugoslavia. The band went on the promotional tour with keyboardist Milorad Džmerković, as keyboardist Branislav Božinović had to leave the band only a month after the album recording to serve his mandatory stint in the Yugoslav army.

In 2000, the song "Seobe" was polled No.43 on Rock Express Top 100 Yugoslav Rock Songs of All Times list.

== Covers ==
- Serbian and Yugoslav rock singer Viktorija recorded a cover of the song "Seobe" on her 2000 album Nostalgija (Nostalgia).
