= Branko Isaković =

Serbian musician (born 1958)

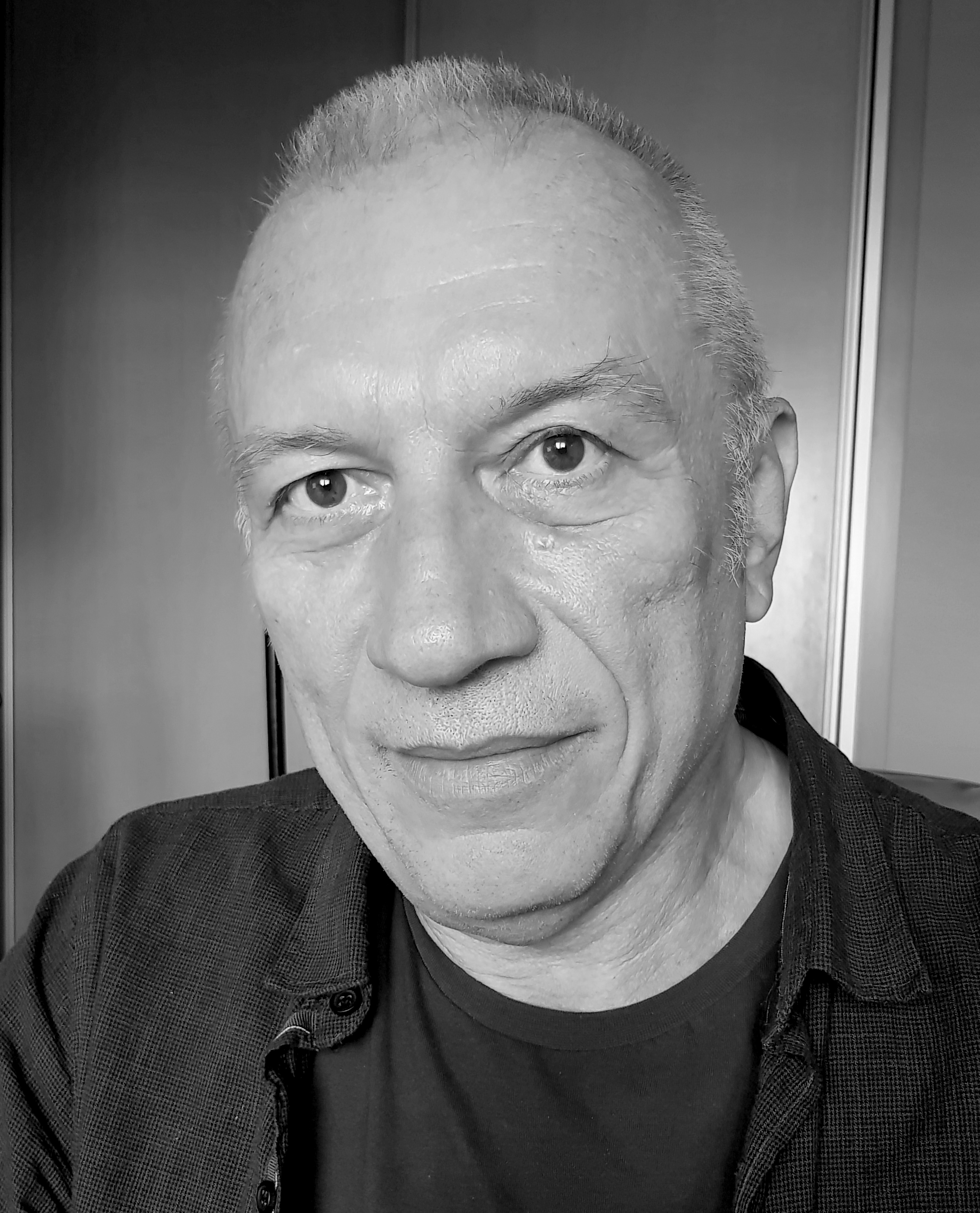

Background information
- Born: 24 June 1958 (age 67); Valjevo, PR Serbia, FPR Yugoslavia
- Genres: ambient, Acoustic, ethnic, new wave, rock, hard rock,
- Instruments: Bass guitar Acoustic guitar
- Years active: 1977 – present
- Labels: Snežana Prokić PR Divine Sound, PGP RTS, HiFi Centar, Multimedia Music

Branko Isaković (born June 24, 1958) is a Serbian bass player, producer and composer of Balkan ambient beat. After a long career in pop, rock, and ethno bands he launched his Divine Sound project with healing music.

== Biography ==
Isaković was born in Valjevo in 1958 and moved to Belgrade in 1961. His first interest in music came about 1970 when his school friend, today well known guitar player and producer Dušan "Duda" Bezuha needed a rhythm guitarist for his rhythm and blues band. Having finished high school Isaković joined the acoustic rock band Suncokret as a replacement for Bata Sokić who went to serve the army. Isaković left the band in 1978.

With former Tilt members Dejan Cukić (vocals) and Predrag Jakovljević (guitar), guitarist Nenad Stamatović and composer and keyboard player Dragan Mitrić, Isaković formed Bulevar.

After Bulevar disbanded Isaković went to Idoli, as a replacement for Zdenko Kolar who went to serve the Yugoslav People's Army, the band was about to record a new album. Idoli members went to London and with producer Bob Painter recorded Čokolada. The album was a high success. When Čokolada tour started, the relationship between the band members became colder and after the Ljubljana show, due to a quarrel, Idoli disbanded. Isaković recorded bass sections on the Šest dana juna soundtrack album which was released as an Idoli record. In 1986 Isaković went to serve the army and on his returned he produced and played bass for Krstić & Šaper album Poslednja mladost u Jugoslaviji released by Jugoton in 1987. Later that year he toured with Bisera Veletanlić in the USSR.

When Dejan Cukić left Bajaga & Instruktori he decided to start a solo career and formed his backing band Spori Ritam Band. The lineup featured Isaković on bass, Dragoljub Đuričić on drums, Dragan Mitrić on keyboards, Saša Lokner on keyboards and Safet Petrovac on guitar. Together they released the Spori ritam album in 1987. He left Spori Ritam Band in 1989. Together with Dragoljub Đuričić, Isaković went to Kerber, hard rock band from Niš. With Kerber he recorded live album 121288 and studio album Peta strana sveta. He left the band in 1992 and returned to Cukić's Spori Ritam Band and played until 2003.

In 1993 Isaković moved to Prague where he worked in a toy factory, Repre Club and as Background Actor in Barrandov Studio in Emir Kusturica movie Underground. During a trip to India in 1994 Isaković got interested into spirituality and ambient and ethnic music. In 1996 he formed The Glissers with Voja Bešić - Beške, Ekatarina Velika keyboard player Margita Stefanović and Marija Mihajlović from Spori Ritam Band. In 1996, during the recording of the first The Glissers album, at the Faculty of Music Arts in Belgrade, with producer Vladimir Stojić (AtmanActive) - Isaković met computer technology for the first time.

In 1997 came out the Dejan Cukić & Spori Ritam Band live album Unplugged recorded live in Novi Sad. At the same time Isaković met Ljuba Ninković who used to be the frontman of a famous acoustic band S Vremena Na Vreme. Together they recorded soundtracks for theater plays and commercial and TV music. The two with Bilja Krstić recorded the album Bistrik on a Pentium I computer in 1999. Together they formed the Bistrik Orchestra which became Bilja Krstić's backing band. The album was a huge success and the band toured Brazil, Russia, France, Italy and Greece. The following year Dejan Cukić recorded a soundtrack for the Divlji med play which is actually a cover album of Bob Dylan's songs with lyrics in Serbian language.

In 2001 with Ivica Stojanović, a friend from the First Belgrade Singers Company, Isaković started a project TeodulIja which was a combination of ethnic music and Christian Orthodox spiritual music. They released the Priče iz davnina CD in 2002. Bilja Krstić & Bistrik Orchestra participated the soundtrack album for Zona Zamfirova in 2001 and in 2003 released a studio album Zapisi.

The Romani music band Kal recorded their debut album in 2005 with Isaković as additional producer. The self-titled album came out in 2006 through B92 records and Asphalt Tango Records. In the meantime Isaković started his own project Divine Sound which is a healing ambiental music band. The album Order of Love came out in April, 2005. It was created as music background for spoken word meditations by Vlado Ilić as part of family system therapy, following Dr Bert Hellinger's Systemic Constellations method. The CD contains five meditative compositions enriched by the voice of Marija Mihajlović and native flute played by Milinko Ivanović. In September, 2005 Bilja Krstić & Bistrik Orchestra started recording a new album released in 2007 entitled Tarpoš. A new TeodulIja album Vino istine came out in 2007. He also played bass in blues-rock bands Les Gigantes and Texas Flood He also wrote music for theatre play Muma Paduri in 2008. In 2011 He wrote music for bestseller book by life coach Ivana Kuzmanović - I Love.

In 2018 he made Aja Sofija Balkan ambient beat CD inspired by his spiritual voyage to Istanbul. It vas released for Label Multimedia Music Belgrade.

His latest CD Prvi Predak. is part of inspirational book by his wife Snežana Prokić. Divine Sound is his band with music healers and music therapists Anika Petrović playing gong, Sonja Kalajić on violin, Shoica and Vladimir Stojković -Coka on perccusion, Maja Pakić and Ksenija Lea Ronai as spiritual and performance artist.

== Discography ==
=== With Suncokret ===
==== Singles ====
- "Dlakavo čudo" / "Noćna ptica" (1979)
- "Sviće novi dan" / "Tvoja mama gunđa protiv mene" (1979)

=== With Bulevar ===
==== Studio albums ====
- Loš i mlad (1981)
- Mala noćna panika (1982)
- Nestašni dečaci (2008)

==== Singles ====
- "Moje bezvezne stvari" / "Nemam ništa važno da te pitam" (1980)
- "Nestašni dečaci" / "Moja lova, tvoja lova" (1981)

==== Various artists compilations ====
- Svi marš na ples! (1981)

=== With Propaganda ===
==== Studio albums ====
- Apatija javnosti (1982)

=== With Krstić & Šaper ===
==== Studio albums ====
- Poslednja mladost u Jugoslaviji (1987)

=== With Dejan Cukić ===
==== Studio albums ====
- Spori ritam (1987)
- 4 ½... Ja bih da pevam (1996)
- Igramo na ulici (1998)
- Divlji med (2000)
- Kalendar (2002)

==== Live albums ====
- Unplugged (1997)
- DC & SRB @ SC (2003)

==== Compilation albums ====
- San na pola puta (1994)

=== With Kerber ===
==== Studio albums ====
- Peta strana sveta (1990)

==== Live albums ====
- 121288 (1989)

=== With Bilja Krstić ===
==== Studio albums ====
- Bistrik (2001)
- Zapisi (2003)
- Tarpoš (2007)

=== With Teodulija ===
==== Studio albums ====
- Priče iz davnina (2002)
- Vino istine (2007)

=== With Kal ===
==== Studio albums ====
- Kal (2002)

=== With Divine Sound ===
==== Studio albums ====
- Order of Love (2005)
- Muma Paduri ( 2009)
- Od kad sam se zavolela - Volim ( 2011)
- Aja Sofija ( 2018 )
- Prvi Predak (2020)

== See also ==
- Serbian rock
- SFR Yugoslav Pop and Rock scene
