= Srđan Branković =

- Birth name: Srđan Branković
- Born: August 10, 1981 (age 43); Smederevo, SR Serbia, SFR Yugoslavia
- Genres: Heavy metal, melodic rock, power metal, rock
- Occupation(s): Musician, songwriter
- Instrument: Guitar
- Labels: Frontiers Records, Locomotive Music

Srđan Branković (born August 10, 1981) is a Serbian guitar player and producer, best known as the member of the progressive/power metal band Alogia. He has had many performances with Alogia, most notably with the Symphony Orchestra and Vojkan Borisavljevic, as well as before the bands Whitesnake, Savatage, Apocalyptica, and in Bulgaria he performed in the backing band Michael Matijevic. In 2008 he was a guest on Shadow Gallery album, "Digital Ghost". In 2021, under the auspices of Frontiers Records, he will start a new band The Big Deal. In 2022, he appeared as a guitarist in the line-up on the first solo album of Rainbow singer Ronnie Romero. He also appeared as a representative / guitarist of his country on the Vivaldi Metal project, in a guitar duo with Chris Caffery.

== Discography ==
=== Studio albums ===
Year	Name	Label
2002	Alogia - Price o Vremenu	One Records
2004	Alogia - Price o Zivotu	One Records
2005	Alogia - Secret Spheres of Art	Locomotive Music
2008	Srdjan Brankovic - Expedition Delta 1	Prog Rock Records/ SPV
2009	Shadow Gallery - Digital Ghosts	Inside Out
2012	Alogia - Price o Snovima	City Records/Power Music
2014	Alogia - Elegia Balcanica	Miner Records
2016	Srdjan Brankovic - Expedition Delta 2	Perris Records USA
2020	Alogia - Semendria	Elevate Records
2020	Alogia - Semendria	Spiritual Beasts JAPAN
2020	Alogia - Semendria VINYL	One Records
2022	The Big Deal - First Bite	Frontiers Records
2022	Ronnie Romero - Raised on Radio	Frontiers Records
2024	The Big Deal - Electrified (to be released)	Frontiers Records

=== Live albums ===
Year	Name	Label
2006	Priče o vremenu i životu – Live at SKC	
2018	Live and loud with Symphonic Orchestra	

=== Video albums ===
Year	Name	Label
2007	Priče o vremenu i životu	One Records

=== Singles ===
Year	Name	Label
2022	The Big Deal Never Say Never'	Frontiers Records
