= Simon Kiselicki =

Macedonian jazz pianist and composer

- Born: 25 October 1974 (age 51); Skopje, Yugoslavia
- Origin: North Macedonia
- Genres: Jazz, ethno jazz, jazz fusion, Macedonian traditional, folk, classical
- Occupations: Musician, composer, arranger
- Instruments: Piano, keyboards, drums, bass guitar, duduk, guitar
- Website: simon-kiselicki.com

Simon Kiselicki (pronounced Simon Kiselichki, Macedonian Cyrillic: Симон Киселички; born October 25, 1974) is a Macedonian jazz pianist, composer, and arranger. He is one of the most influential personalities of the upcoming Macedonian jazz scene, as a solo musician and as a member of “The Simon Kiselicki Group”, “Klerzo”, and “La Colonie Volvox”. Kiselicki’s contributions across Europe and the Balkans include being one of the first musicians to bring jazz music to Macedonian stages and clubs at the start of the 90s.

Simon has composed seven albums, one of which was released by the Skopje Jazz Festival, as well as having arranged for other artists' projects including Bodan Arsovski's 'Broken Beats' album. Kiselicki has performed at European festivals including Exit Festival, Skopje Jazz Festival, Petrovac Jazz Festival, Glazba i Rec Festival Cavtat, Kumanovo Jazz Festival, SOSFest, Peace Unlimited Festival, and more. He is also known for his ten-year contribution to the Dubrovnik jazz scene at the Hard Jazz Cafe Troubadour, considered as one of Dubrovnik's most influential jazz musicians. He is written in the Macedonian Rock Encyclopedia by Tosho Filipovski and the Ex Yugo Rock Encyclopedia.

Simon plays ten instruments in total: piano, keyboards, xylophone, drums, congas, bongos, guitar, tambura, bass guitar and duduk, a traditional Macedonian instrument. Piano being his primary instrument, Simon has also recorded material performing the duduk on several albums.

== Biography ==
=== Early life ===
Simon Kiselicki was born on 25 October 1974 in Skopje, Yugoslavia (present-day North Macedonia). At a young age his parents bought him a melodica which he constantly played, but was fed up of having to blow through the mouthpiece to receive a note. His solution was to sellotape a hairdryer to the mouthpiece so that the sound could be achieved without pauses, and ended up burning the melodica. His parents realised that Simon was better off learning the piano. Simon's initial introduction to music was through the drums, but later showed greater interest in the piano. He studied piano, percussion and theory at Ilija Nikolovski – Luj high school. In 1994, Simon would study classical composition under the guide of Goce Kolarovski.

At the start of the 90s, Kiselicki was one of the first musicians to bring jazz to Macedonian clubs, alongside musicians Djole Grujovski (guitarist), Goce Stevkovski (drummer), Darko Muchev (bassist), Marija Dimitrijevic (vocalist) and Dzemal Cakic (trumpeter). Jazz had been played before in Macedonia, but these musicians were the first to make jazz performances official in clubs and on stages.

Simon's first composition 'Suite for Piano' was presented in 1995 (performed by Marjana Nikolovska) on Macedonian Radio Television (MRTV) for the Days of Macedonian Music Festival (Denovi Na Makedonska Muzika).

=== Klerzo ===
In 1995, at 21 years of age, Simon initiated the second formation of Macedonian prog-rock group Klerzo with colleagues Sasho Gigov – Gis (vocalist), Goce Stevkovski (drummer), Darko Muchev (bassist), Goran Bugarinovski (flautist) and Sasho Spasovski (guitarist). The group, highly celebrated, performed across Macedonia, performing hits such as 'Pirunika' and 'Sonce', functioning for about two years.

=== Night and Day, Ezgija Orchestra ===
In 1997 Simon began collaborating with Bodan Arsovski (former Leb i Sol bassist) and the Ezgija Orchestra for his album 'Broken Beats', performing at EthnoFest Neum (1998) and Kursumli An. In the meantime, he would become the music manager for Lady Blue Jazz Club, and performed with his jazz quintet 'Night and Day' with Goce Stevkovski, Darko Muchev, Goce Micanov on the saxophone and Goce Dimitrovski on the trumpet. Simon's first jazz compositions were recorded for MRTV (produced by Ilija Peovski), and later Simon applied to study at Peovski's class, learning jazz piano and harmony.

=== Beneventan Trio, Hard Jazz Cafe Troubadour ===
In 1999 Simon travelled to Croatia and found the Hard Jazz Cafe Troubadour in Dubrovnik, under the management of late Marko Breskovic, where he would perform every summer for ten years, recognised as one of the jazz musicians responsible for the popularisation and growth of one of the world's most important jazz scene. In 2001 he moved to Budapest, Hungary, where he began composing for his first album Beneventana. He formed the Beneventan Trio in 2002 when he returned to Skopje with Dino Milosavljevic (drums) and Djole Maksimovski (bass), and performed together at events such as the Skopje Summer Festival (2003) and Ohrid's Cultural House. From these concerts, Beneventana was created and in 2003 later released by Skopje Jazz Festival Records. A month later, the Beneventan Trio performed at the Skopje Jazz Festival.

=== Levitation, Jamajla ===
In 2004 the Simon Kiselicki Group was formed. Simon began composition on his second album Levitation, with musicians Dave Wilson (alto saxophone), Dionis Stratrov (bass guitar), Sale Stojanovski (drums), and guest musicians Dzijan Emin (horn), Marie Petrov (trombone), Mihail Parushev (bouzouki) and Goce Stevkovski (percussion (7)). During this time he toured the Balkans, and in 2007 released the album on his return to Dubrovnik for the summer. During his time in Croatia he performed and worked at the Glazba i Rec Festival, Cavtat, performing his project Future Balkan Music composed for piano, flute, violin and bassoon. As well as this, he performed at the Petrovac Jazz Festival in Montenegro with the Simon Kiselicki Trio. In 2008 Simon composed his third album Jamajla with Aleksandar Ikonomov (double bass) and Aleksandar Sekulovski (drums).

=== 2009–2016 ===
Simon joined the Macedonian avant-garde and jazz fusion group La Colonie Volvox in 2009. He would record his fourth and fifth albums with them, Europa and East West and Rest. The Europa album was funded by the Macedonian Ministry of Culture. La Colonie Volvox was commissioned to perform at the European Parliament in Brussels. The band toured Europe during this time, their travels concluding a 5500 km journey, and as a result the East West and Rest album was inspired and composed. In the same year, Simon composed, conducted and arranged for the orchestra of the Macedonian theatrical performance of Troilus and Cressida, which was the biggest theatrical performance recorded in Macedonia, with 120 performers and 4,000 guests. Furthermore, Simon recorded his composition 'Jamajla' (which was a composition from his then unreleased album 'Jamajla') for the Jazz from Macedonia 2009 album by Skopje Jazz Festival Records. Meanwhile, Simon recorded his sixth album Same No More. In 2010, East West and Rest was released. In 2011, Simon studied jazz piano and jazz harmony in Ilija Peovski's class at Goce Delvec University.

From 2009 to 2016, Kiselicki would tour the Balkans and Europe in different formations (solo artist, the Beneventan Trio and the Simon Kiselicki Trio). During this time he performed at festivals and concerts including the Sofia Live Club (2011, Bulgaria) and SOS Fest 2015 (Serbia).

=== Flow Now at Daut Pashin Amam Live AV Project ===
In November 2016 at Daut Pashin Amam, Skopje, Simon performed his solo concert 'Flow Now', the first jazz concert to have taken place in the historical monument. The concept of the concert was that it was mostly improvised, and that Simon would play what he felt "in the very moment". The performance was created as an AV Production, Flow Now Live at Daut Pashin Amam (DMA Music the digital promoters, with Alexander ARP – AleXanDer AV recording house). Later Simon would collaborate with DMA Music to re-release his albums Levitation and Beneventana. In December he performed the 'Flow Now' repertoire but this time with the Simon Kiselicki Trio (Goran Geshovski on bass and Aleksandar Vancovski on drums) at Stanica 26 for the year round Twelve Moons of Jazz Festival.

=== Jamajla, Same No More ===
From April 2017 onward, Simon would travel across Europe, first arriving in Italy. He lived in Italy for three months, performing at venues such as Genoa's Count Basie Club. He returned to Dubrovnik after a ten-year break, and performed again at the Troubadour as well as Cele Club, collaborating with old colleagues including Mihael Parushev (drums) and Maja Grgic (vocals). In December he arrived in Valencia, Spain, and would become a popular face in the Valencian jazz community, hitting stages such as Funkadelia and performing a Macedonian Jazz concert at Estudio 21. Other concert venues in Europe include The Art Foundation (Sofia, Bulgaria) and Evergreen Jazz Club (Kotor, Montenegro).

On 20 September 2018 the 'secret' album Jamajla (which was recorded in 2008) was finally released by Jazz Fortnight, and on 29 September the Simon Kiselicki Trio performed and promoted the album at Public Room, Skopje.

On 7 January 2019, the solo piano album ‘Same No More’, also kept away for 10 years, was self-released.

On 16 January 2020, a song which Simon composed, arranged and performed in was released by the British singer Nicol (singer) called 'I Am In Your Coffee'. On 14 October 2020, Nicol released 'Euphoric', which was co-composed with Simon.

=== Other ===
As a child his artistic engagements not only extended in music but also in acting. Simon acted in the series Makedonski Narodni Prikazni (1986), Trst via Skopje (1987) as the character ‘Amdi’, and Vtora Smena (1988) as the character 'Cane'.

== Discography ==
=== As leader or co-leader ===
- Beneventana (2003)
- Levitation (2007)
- Europa (2009)
- East West and Rest (2010)
- Flow Now Live at Daut Pashin Amam (2016)
- Jamajla (2018)
- Same No More (2019)

=== With others ===
With Skopje Jazz Festival Records

- Jazz From Macedonia (2009)

=== As sideman ===
With Bodan Arsovski & Ezgija Orchestra

- Broken Beats (1999)

With Last Expedition

- BoX (1997)

With La Colonie Volvox

- Blue Bird (2015)

With Nicol

- Jazz Songs (2018)
- I Am In Your Coffee (2020)
- Euphoric (2020)

=== Singles ===
- Rasim Raspashan (2009)
- Electric Reptil (approx. 2011)
- Bejbeja (approx. 2011)
- Inspiration Erebica (2013)
- The Faraons (2014)
- Caravan (approx. 2012)
- Djangle Live in Karpos (2013)

With Klerzo

- Pirunika (1996)
- Sonce (1996)

With Brejk

- Bolis (2013)
