= Bread and salt =

Greeting ceremony in European and Middle-Eastern cultures

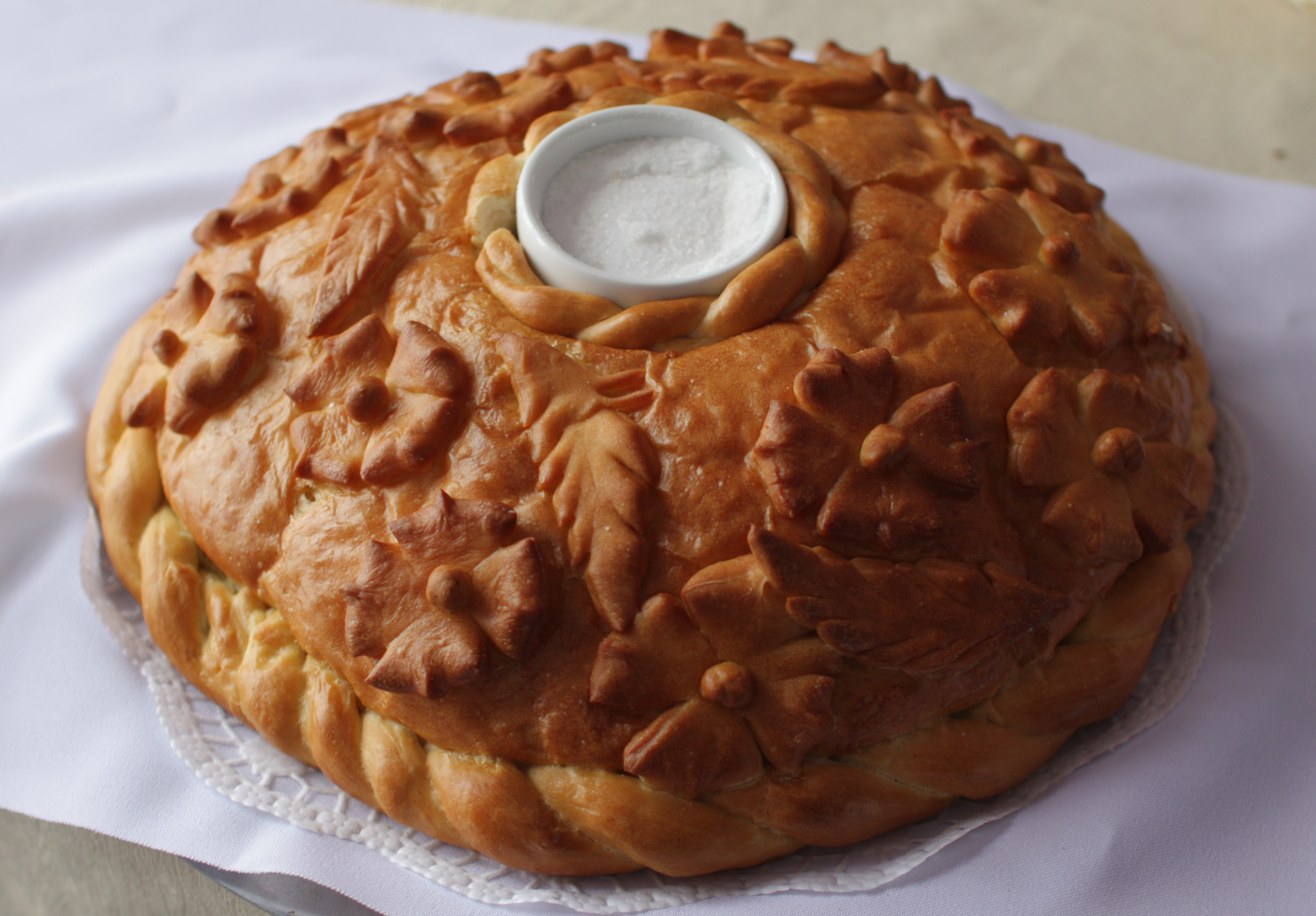
Bread and salt, a traditional greeting in some Slavic, Baltic, Balkan, and Middle Eastern countries

Bread and salt are offered to guests in a ceremony of welcome in cultures around the world. This pair of foods is particularly significant in Slavic countries, but is also notable in Baltic, non-Slavic Balkan, and Middle Eastern cultures. Bread and salt as a traditional greeting remains common in Albania, Armenia, and among the Jewish diaspora. This tradition has been extended to spaceflight. Additionally, in traditional Slavic folklore, consuming a combination of bread and salt as an offering is believed to be a powerful, last-resort method of wish-making.

== Background ==
Salt is an essential nutrient, and has long held an important place in religion and culture. For example, it is mentioned in the Bible dozens of times, including as a covenant of salt. Bread is a staple food, leavened or unleavened. It is usually made of wheat, but other grains can be used. Bread represents the day-to-day necessities of life and happiness in many cultures, such as the Lord's Prayer.

== Etymology ==
The tradition is known locally by its Slavic names, all literal variants of "bread and salt": Belarusian: хлеб і соль, Bulgarian: хляб и сол, Czech: chléb a sůl, Macedonian: леб и сол, Polish: chleb i sól, Russian: хлеб-соль, Serbo-Croatian: хлеб и со, hlȅb i so, Slovak: chlieb a soľ, Slovene: kruh in sol, Ukrainian: хліб і сіль. It is shared with some of the neighbouring non-Slavic peoples—the Latvians and Lithuanians (both Baltic nations), Romanians and Moldovans (Romance), as well as the Finno-Ugric Karelians, Estonians, and Hungarians—all of whom are culturally and historically close to their Slavic neighbours: Karelian: leipä-šuola, Estonian: soolaleivapidu, Latvian: sālsmaize, Lithuanian: duona ir druska, Hungarian: kenyér és só, Romanian: pâine și sare. It is also common in Albania (Albanian: bukë, kripë e zemër), Armenia (Armenian: աղ ու հաց, agh u hats), Turkey (Turkish: tuz-ekmek hakkı), among the Jewish diaspora (Hebrew: לחם ומלח, romanized: leḥem umalaḥ), and within parts of the Middle East under different names.

== Cultural associations ==
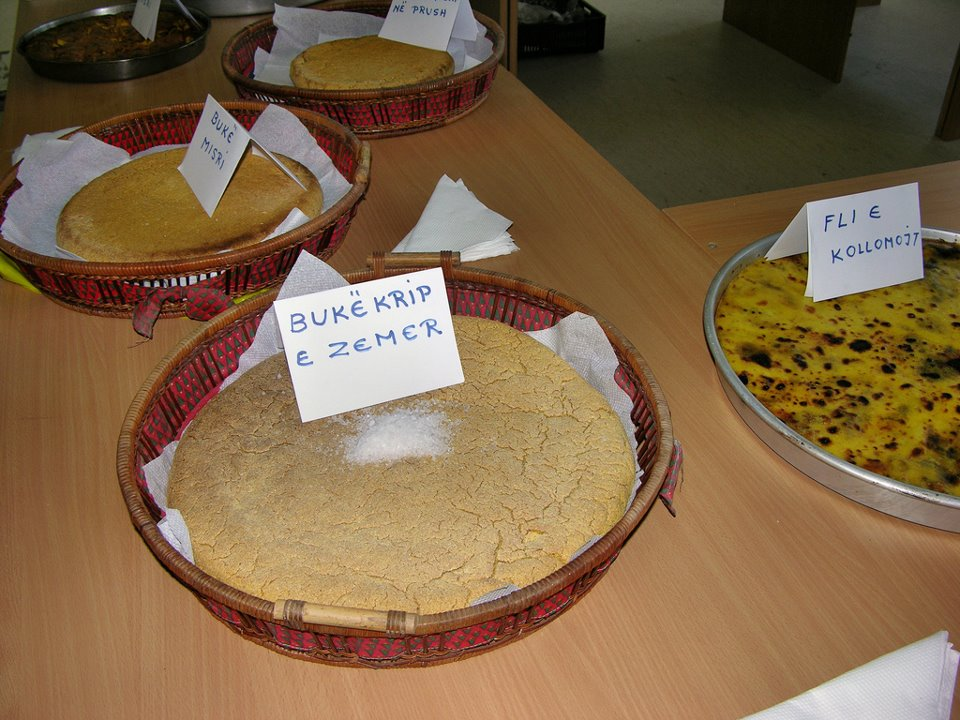

Bread and salt as a traditional greeting is shared with some non-Slavic nations—Lithuanians, Latvians (both Baltic), Romanians, Moldovans (both Romance) as well as Karelians, Estonians, Hungarians (Finno-Ugric)—all of which are culturally and historically close to their Slavic neighbours.

=== Albania ===
Bread, salt, and heart (Albanian: bukë, kripë e zemër) is a traditional Albanian way of honoring guests, it dates back from the Kanun of Lekë Dukagjini, chapter 18 - para. 608: "The Guest shall be welcomed with Bread, salt and heart". Heart in the context is related with hospitality, the concept is based on giving the most expensive thing of that time which was salt to the awaited guest. Nowadays it is not commonly practiced in daily life.

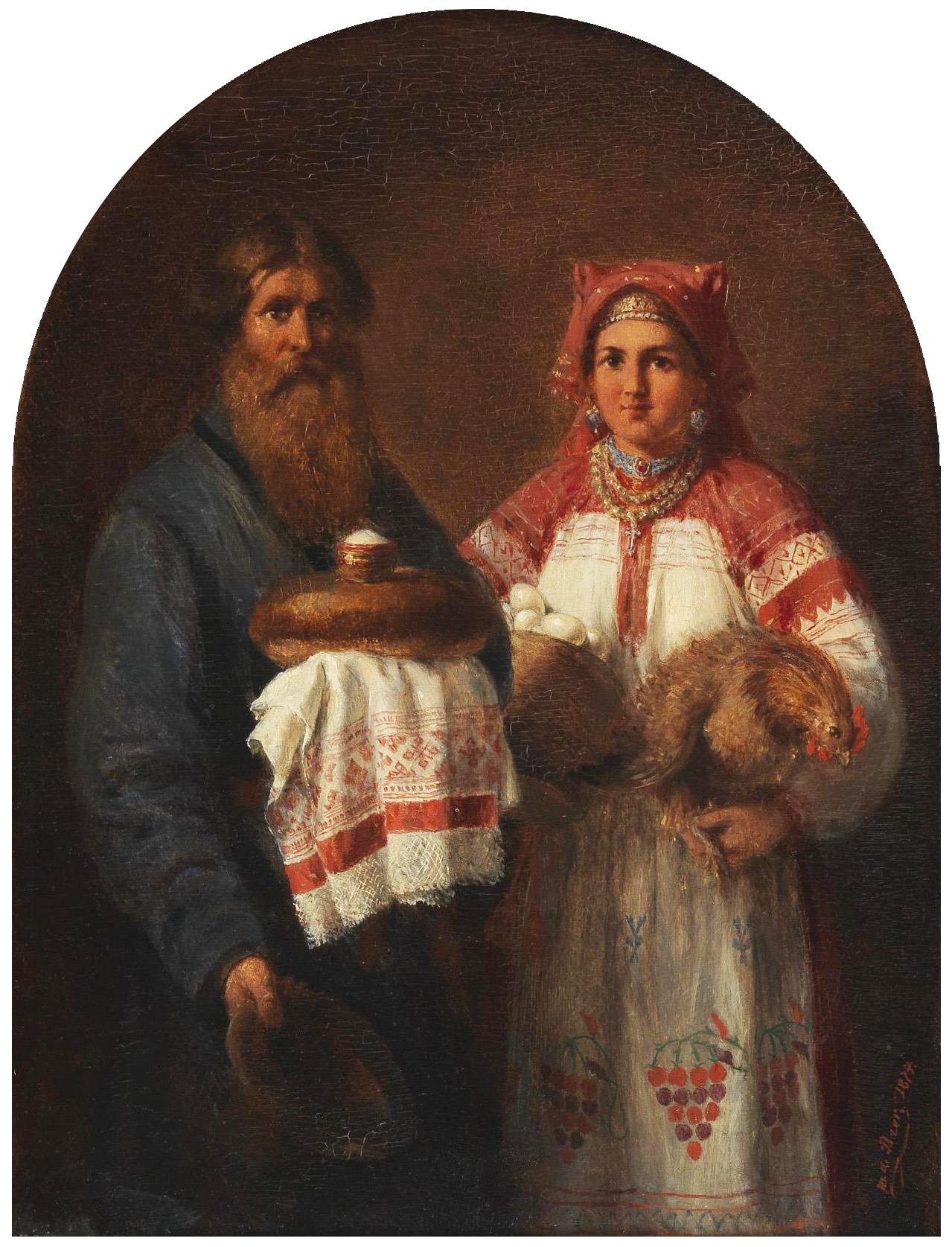
Old painting by Wilhelm Amandus Beer "Russian Well-Wishers" portrays the Russian tradition of bread and salt, 1874.

=== East Slavs ===
When important, respected, or admired guests arrive, they are presented with a loaf of bread (usually a korovai) placed on a rushnyk (embroidered ritual cloth). A salt holder or a salt cellar is placed on top of the bread loaf or secured in a hole on the top of the loaf. On official occasions, the "bread and salt" is usually presented by young women dressed in national costumes (e.g., sarafan and kokoshnik).

The tradition gave rise to the Russian word that expresses a person's hospitality: khlebosolny (literally: "bready-salty"). In general, the word "bread" is associated in Russian culture with hospitality, with bread being the most respected food, whereas salt is associated with long friendship, as expressed in a Russian saying "to eat a pood of salt (together with someone)". Also historically the Russian Empire had a high salt tax that made salt a very expensive and prized commodity (see also the Moscow uprising of 1648).

There also is a traditional Russian greeting "Khleb da sol!" (Хлеб да соль!, 'Bread and salt!'). The phrase is to be uttered by an arriving guest as an expression of good wish towards the host's household. It was often used by beggars as an implicit hint to be fed, therefore a mocking rhymed response is known: "Khleb da sol!" — "Yem da svoy!" (Хлеб да соль — ем да свой! "Bread and salt!" — "I am eating and it is my own!").

In Russian weddings, it is a traditional custom for the bride and groom to be greeted after the ceremony by family, usually the matriarch, with bread and salt in an embroidered cloth. This confers good health and fortune unto the newlyweds. In the Russian Orthodox Church, it is customary to greet the bishop at the steps of the church when he arrives for a pastoral visit to a church or monastery with bread and salt.

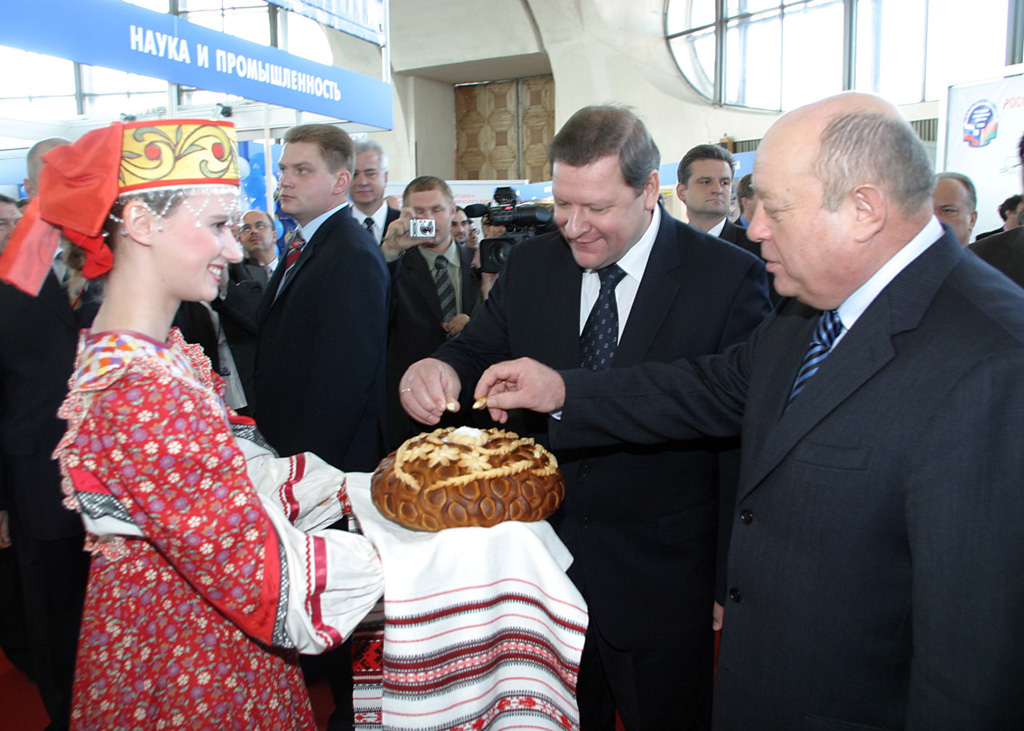
Russian Prime Minister Mikhail Fradkov and his Belarusian counterpart Sergei Sidorsky (from right to left) at the opening of a Russian national exposition underway in Minsk as part of the first Russian-Belarusian economic forum

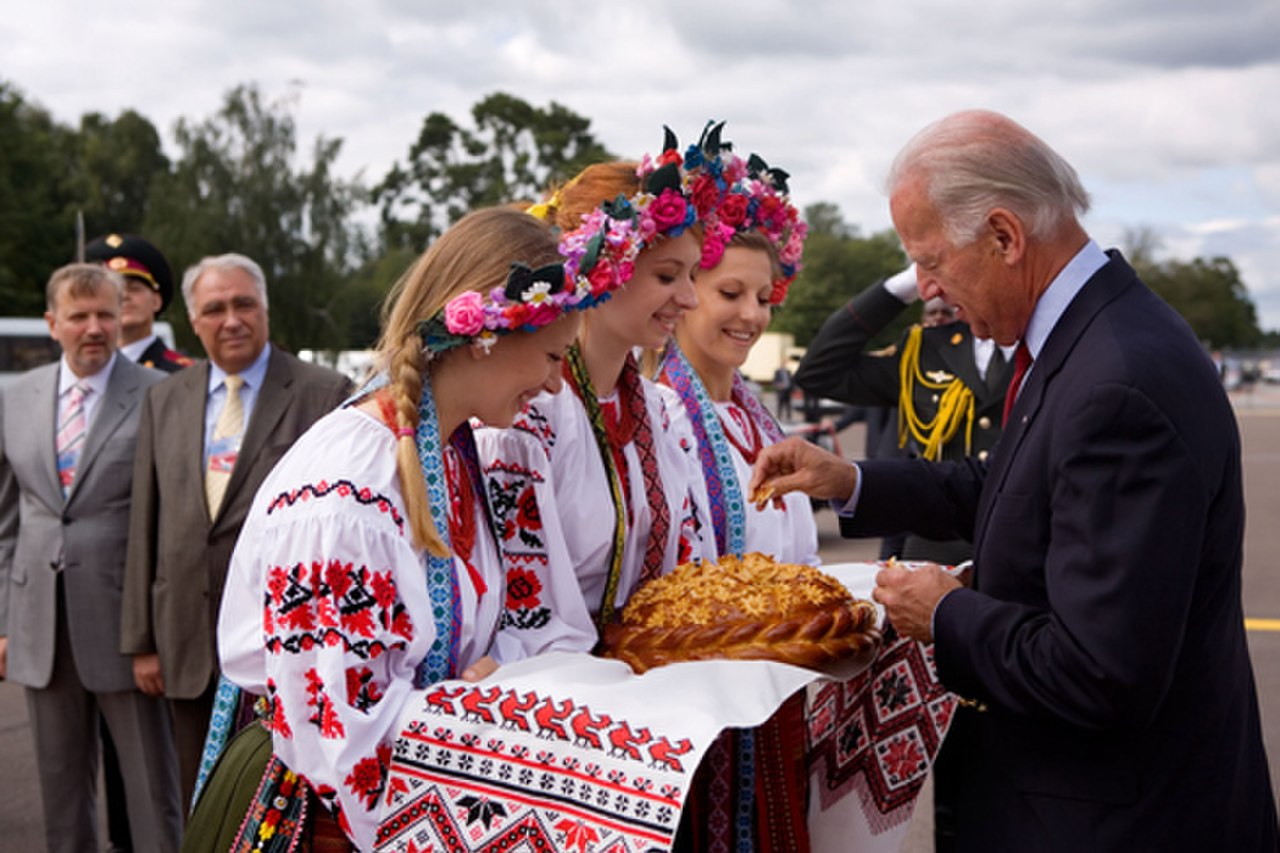
Vice President Joe Biden dips a piece of bread in salt as part of a welcoming ceremony upon his arrival in Kyiv, Ukraine, July 20, 2009.

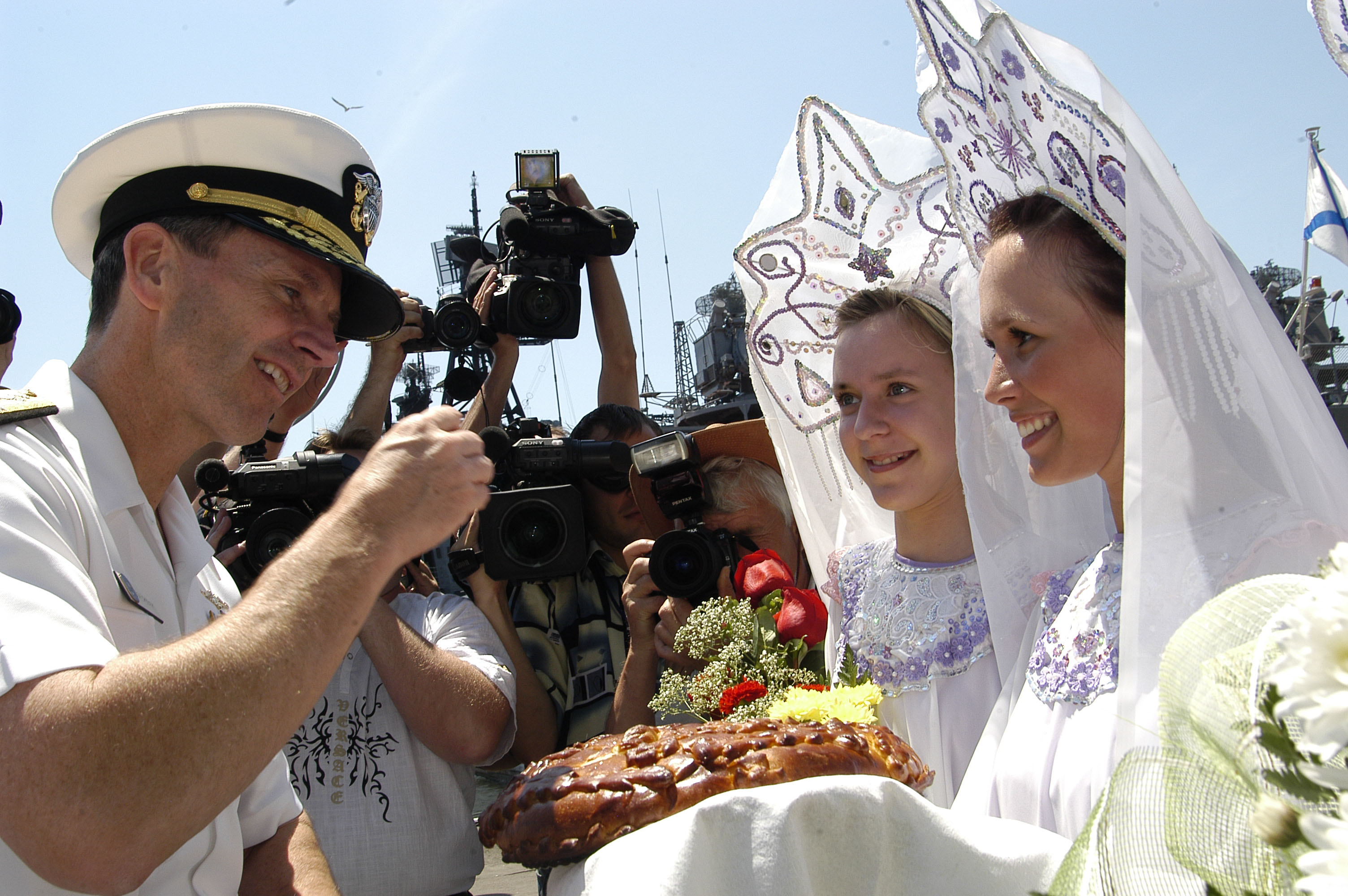
US Naval officer Jonathan Greenert takes part in a bread and salt ceremony after arriving in Vladivostok, Russia, July 3, 2006.

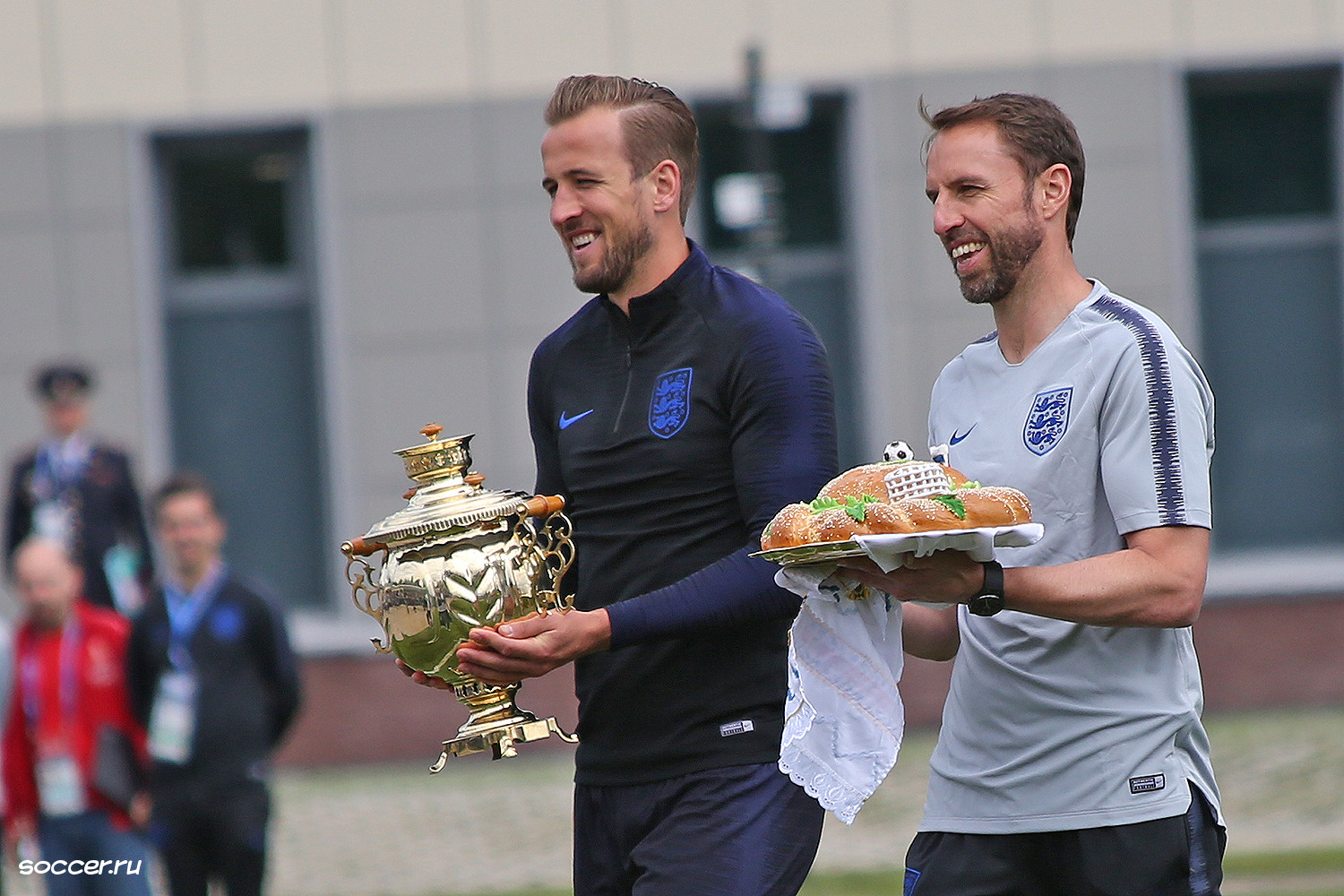
Football team manager Gareth Southgate and football player Harry Kane taking part in a bread and salt ceremony after arriving in Saint Petersburg, Russia, 13 June 2018

=== Bulgaria ===
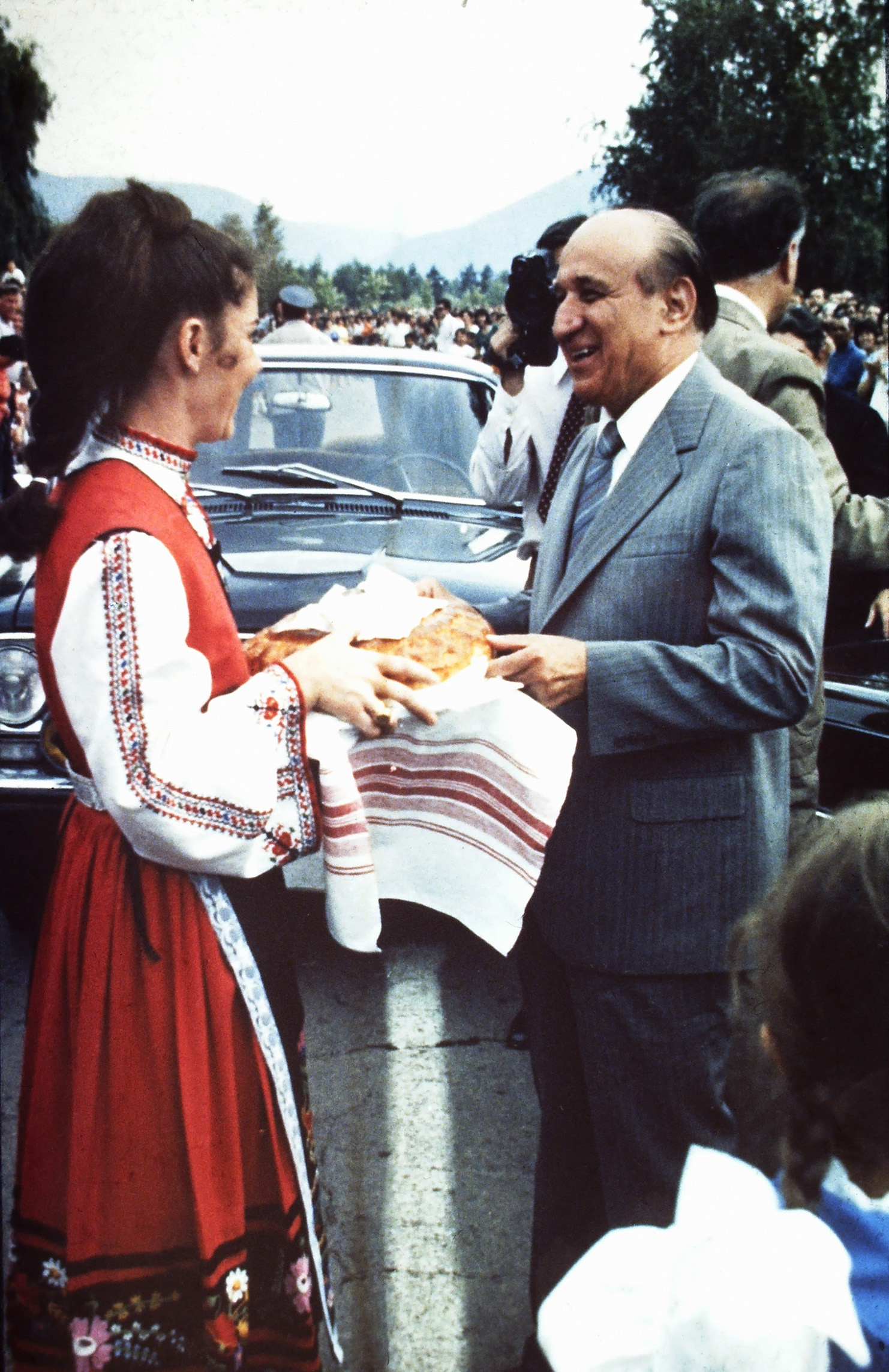
The opening of new production facilities of Plastchim in Botevgrad, Bulgaria. Todor Zhivkov is welcomed with bread and salt.

Bread and salt (Bulgarian: хляб и сол, romanized: hlyab i sol) is a traditional Bulgarian custom expressing hospitality, showing that the guest is welcomed. The bread and salt is commonly presented to guests by a woman. Bulgarians usually make a certain type of bread for this occasion called pogacha, which is flat, fancy, and decorated. Regular bread is not usually used, although it may have been historically, but pogacha is much more common in this custom.

Usually, guests are presented with the pogacha, and the guest is supposed to take a small piece, dip into the salt and eat it. This custom is common for official visits regardless of whether the guest is foreign or Bulgarian. One notable example of this custom is when the Russians came to liberate Bulgaria from the Ottomans at the end of the 19th century. A common scene from that period was of a Bulgarian village woman welcoming Russian soldiers with bread and salt as a sign of gratitude.

=== Poland ===
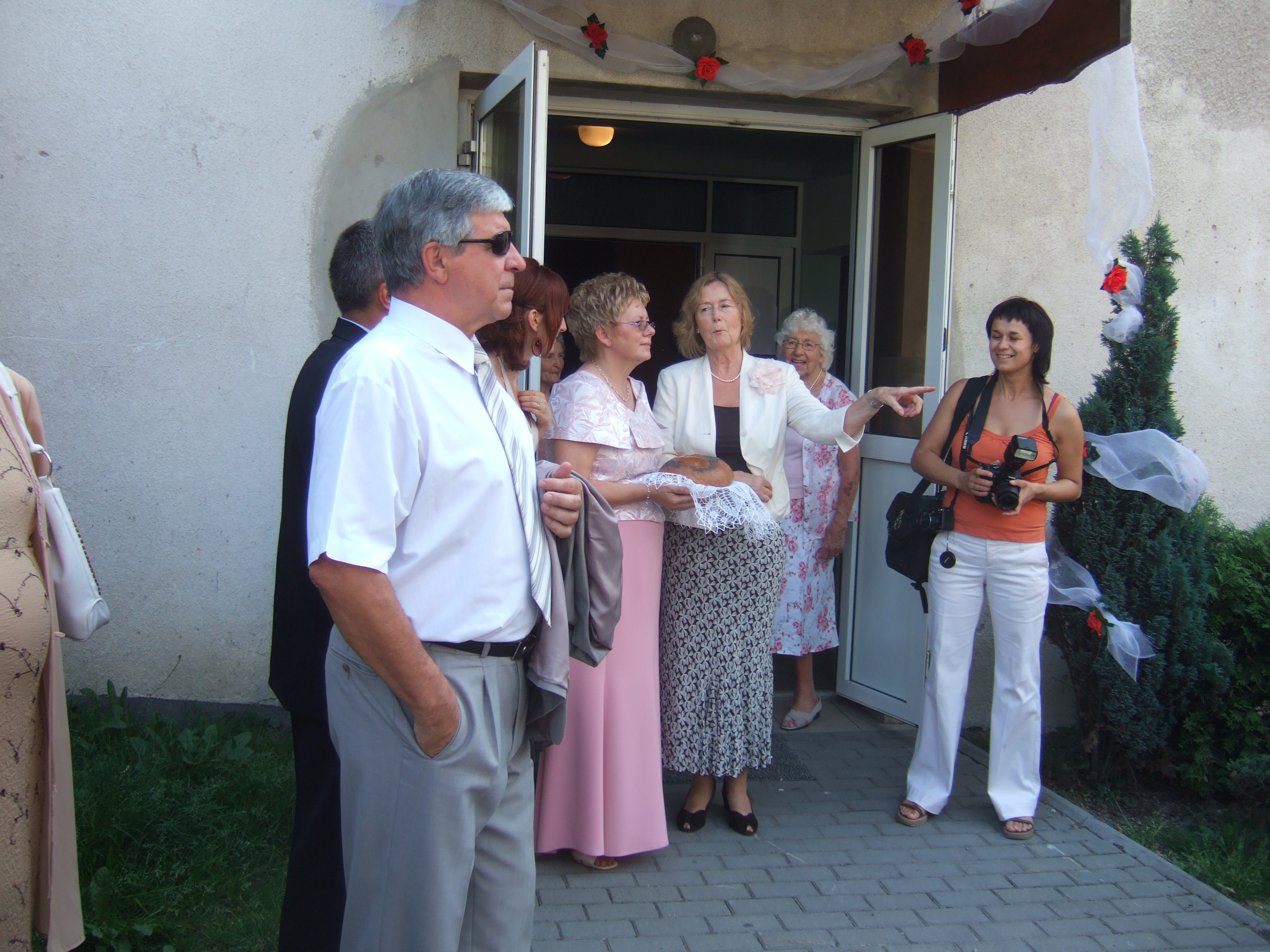
Waiting for the bride and groom with the bread and salt in Poland

In Poland, welcoming with bread and salt ("chlebem i solą") is often associated with the traditional hospitality ("staropolska gościnność") of the Polish nobility (szlachta), who prided themselves on their hospitality. A 17th-century Polish poet, Wespazjan Kochowski, wrote in 1674: "O good bread, when it is given to guests with salt and good will!" Another poet who mentioned the custom was Wacław Potocki. The custom was, however, not limited to the nobility, as Polish people of all classes observed this tradition, reflected in old Polish proverbs. Nowadays, the tradition is mainly observed on wedding days, when newlyweds are greeted with bread and salt by their parents on returning from the church wedding.

=== North Macedonia ===
In the North Macedonia, this tradition still is practiced occasionally as a custom expressing hospitality. A certain type of bread, similar to that in Bulgaria and also by the same name—pogača (from Latin: panis focacius) is prepared.

The notable Macedonian and ex-Yugoslav ethno-jazz-rock group of the world music guitarist Vlatko Stefanovski had the name "Leb i Sol", which means "bread and salt" and speaks itself about this term of hospitality as something basic and traditional.

=== Romania and Moldova ===
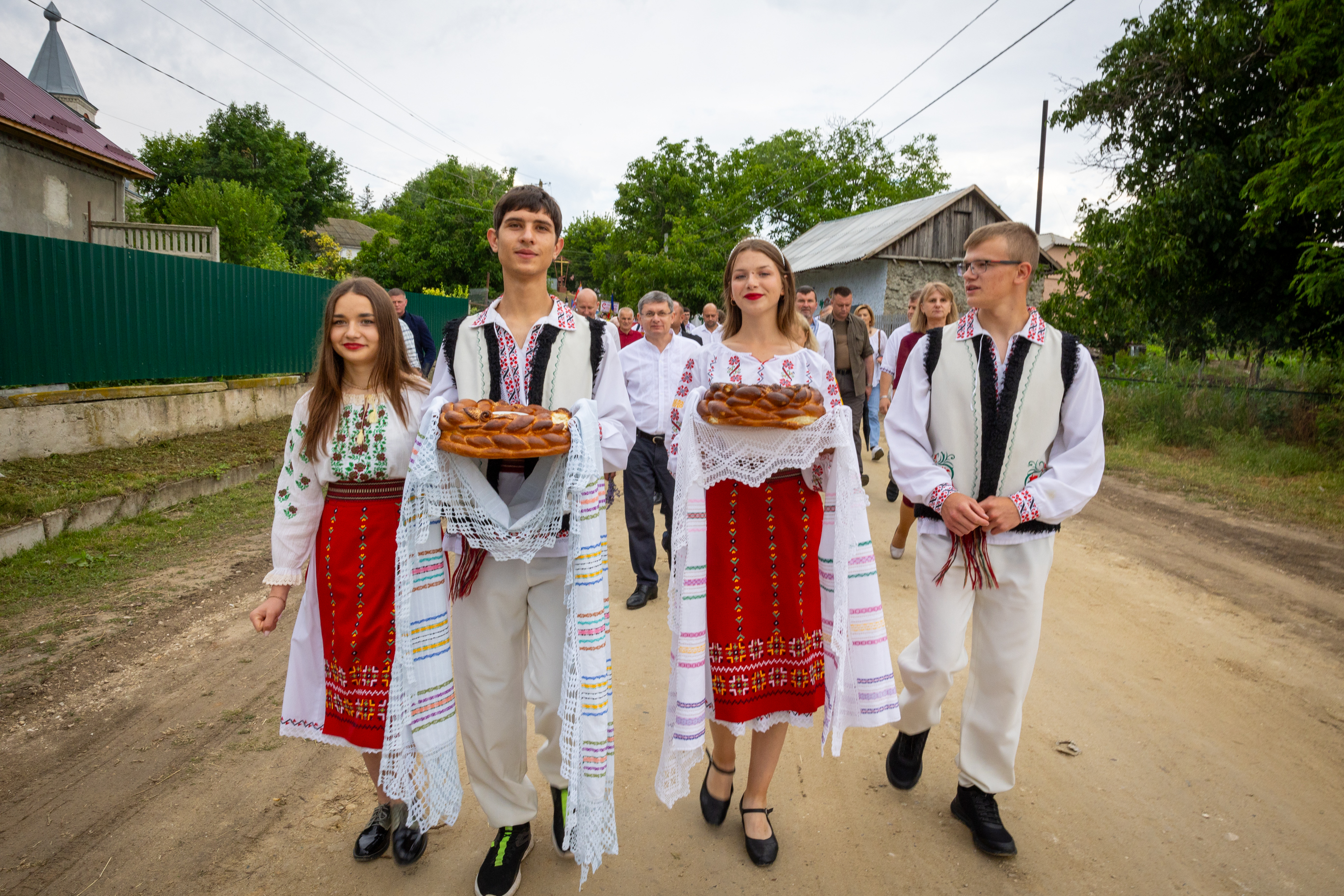
Bread and salt ceremony in Moldova

As in the neighbouring Slavic countries, bread and salt is a traditional Romanian custom expressing hospitality, showing that the guest is welcomed. In Transylvania bread and salt are served to protect against weather demons.

=== Serbia ===
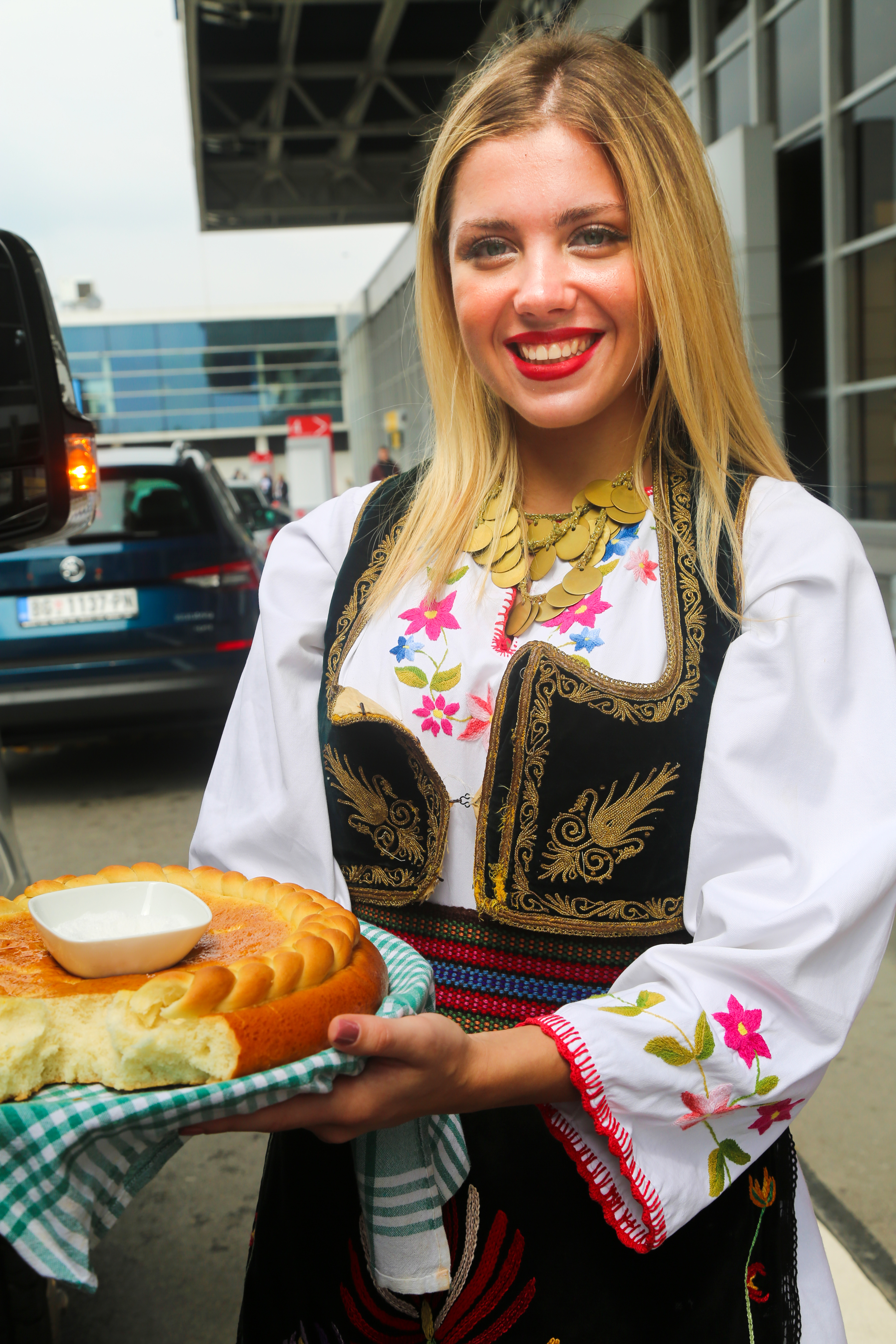
Serbian woman with bread and salt

Bread and salt (Serbian: хлеб и со) is a traditional welcoming of guests, being customary to offer it before anything else, with bread having an important place in Serbian tradition, used in rituals. The traditional bread, pogača, is a symbol of family unity and goodness, and salt prosperity and security for the guest. It is part of the state protocol, in use since the Principality of Serbia, often used when welcoming foreign representatives.

=== Slovakia and Czechia ===
The long-tradition of the Slovakia and the Czech Republic as Slavic countries is to welcome important visits with bread and salt. An example is the welcome of Pope Francis in Bratislava 2021 by president Zuzana Čaputová.

=== Finland, Estonia, Latvia, and Lithuania ===
In Finland, Estonia, Latvia, and Lithuania, bread and salt were traditionally given as a symbol of blessing for a new home. This tradition continues today and instead of white bread, dark fiber-rich rye bread is often used. The tradition is still kept alive in Eastern Karelia and in Ingria by the minor Baltic Finnic peoples.

=== Hungary ===
In Hungary, bread, as a basic food that symbolizes and ensures the well-being, abundance, and fertility of the family, is usually used at the beginning of something, when it is characteristic to magically ensure future goals. It is a common folk custom to bring bread and salt to a new house, which ensures or symbolizes the well-being of the household.

=== Germany ===
Bread and salt are given away for different reasons:

- to the wedding for a lasting alliance between spouses
- to move into a house to wish prosperity and fertility

In northern Germany bread and salt are traditionally put into the diaper of a newborn.

=== Greece ===
In Greece, the phrase "bread and salt" is used to describe a strong friendship bond. When it is said that you have eaten bread and salt with someone, means that you have a lot of shared experiences, and particularly went through hardships together (as bread and salt is considered a food of extreme poverty).. Physical bread and salt ceremonies are uncommon.

=== Turkish culture ===
According to some Turkic legends, the bread and salt were discovered by the grandsons of Japheth, the ancestor of the Turks in medieval Islam. In the Turkish language, sometimes salt is used as a synonym for the words sugar and flavour. Saying "they added salt to their words" means "they say sweet words." Newborns are bathed in salt water to prevent them from smelling. Salt was believed to remove the evil eye and there is a salt saint in Turkish folklore called Tuz Baba. Bread is considered sacred and is highly respected. Together, salt and bread create the concept of tuz-ekmek hakkı, "salt-bread right" in which if two or more people eat bread and salt together, they become friends, and there is an alliance between them. The concept was widely popular in Ottoman literature and Turkish folk literature.

There are various folkloric beliefs related to salt and bread, most often affecting children; to make the birth easier, bread, salt and a knife are placed next to the mother. In Samsun, it is believed that if two mothers who have given birth 40 days ago meet on the street, their children will not be able to walk. To prevent this, one of the mothers must give salt and bread to another mother who has a daughter. In Turkish folklore, there is a demon called Albastı, which harms postpartum mothers. In Adana, mothers walk around with a bag containing salt, bread and a nail until the postpartum period ends the 40th day after giving birth.

Bread and salt are also used for rainmaking. When it rains heavily, parents give to their firstborn child bread in one hand and salt in the other hand. Then the child says, "Until this salt melts, let the rain stop". In Muş, it is believed that a girl who eats salted bread during Hıdırellez and does not drink water before going to bed will dream of her soulmate. Salt and bread are used in love magic too.

=== Arab culture ===
Arab culture also has a concept of "bread and salt" (خبز وملح or عيش وملح), not in the context of welcoming, but as an expression of alliance by eating together, symbolizing the rapprochement between two persons. Eating bread and salt with a friend is considered to create a moral obligation which requires gratitude. This attitude is also expressed by Arab phrases such as "there are bread and salt between us" (بيننا خبز وملح or بيننا عيش وملح), and "salt between them" (بينهما ملح) which are terms of alliance.

=== Jewish culture ===
A similar practice also exists among Jews in the Diaspora and in Israel. After the ceremony of kiddush, a piece of challah is dipped in salt and eaten. The challah is a staple food eaten on special occasions, like holidays and weddings, as well as every shabbat. Bread and salt were also used in the past at welcoming ceremonies, given to respected persons.

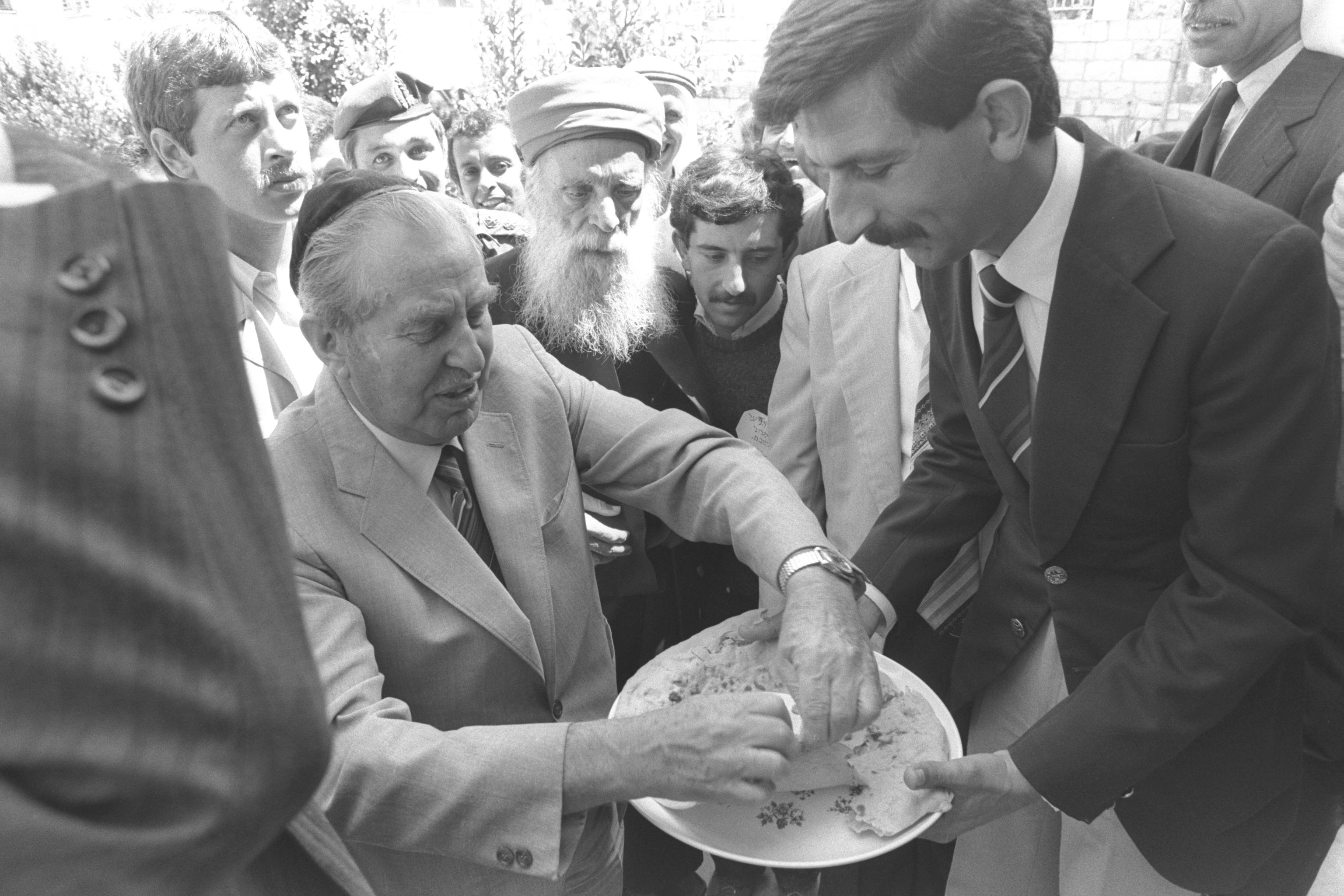
President of Israel Chaim Herzog welcomed by the Samaritan Community with bread and salt

=== Iranian culture ===
In Iranian culture, when a guest is welcomed into the home, it is said that they have eaten bread and salt, which this leads to loyalty of the guest.

=== In space ===
With the advent of the Soviet space program, this tradition has spread into space, where appropriately small packages of bread and salt are used nowadays. It was observed at the Apollo–Soyuz Test Project and the Salyut programme, when crackers and salt tablets were used in the spaceship. Bread chunks and salt were used as a welcome at the Mir space station, a tradition that was extended on the International Space Station. Bread and salt are also used to welcome cosmonauts returning to Earth.

== In fiction ==
The custom of serving bread and salt to guests is a recurring reference in George R. R. Martin's A Song of Ice and Fire novels (1996–present), where the welcome ritual serves not only as a Westerosi tradition of hospitality, but also a formal assurance of "guest right", a sacred bond of trust and honor guaranteeing that nobody in attendance, hosts and guests alike, shall be harmed. Violating the guest right is widely considered among the highest moral crimes, an affront worthy of the worst damnation, rivaled only by kinslaying. Game of Thrones (2011–2019), the associated television series, prominently features the tradition in season 3, episode 9, "The Rains of Castamere" (2013).

In Season 2, Episode 4 of Peaky Blinders, Alfie Solomons offers Charles Sabini bread and salt as Sabini offers a white flag of truce.

Rudyard Kipling referenced bread and salt in a number of works. In The Ballad of East and West, leavened bread and salt is mentioned as binding an oath of blood brothership. At the beginning of Puck of Pook's Hill Puck establishes his credentials with the child protagonists by asking them to sprinkle plenty of salt on their shared meal. "That'll show you the sort of person I am."

In Rosemary Sutcliff's historical novel Outcast, bread and salt is referred to as a sign of belonging to a tribe: "You are my people, my own people, by hearth fire and bread and salt".

In The Count of Monte Cristo by Alexandre Dumas, Chapter 72 is titled "Bread and Salt". The character Mercedes attempts to coax the main character into eating fruit, as part of an Arabian custom to ensure that those who have shared food and drink together under one roof would be eternal friends.

Bread and salt are given as a housewarming gift in one scene of the 1946 film It's a Wonderful Life.

In The Solar War, the first book belonging to Black Library's The Siege of Terra series, the character Malcador the Sigillite offers bread and salt to a weary Emperor of Mankind.

== Gallery ==
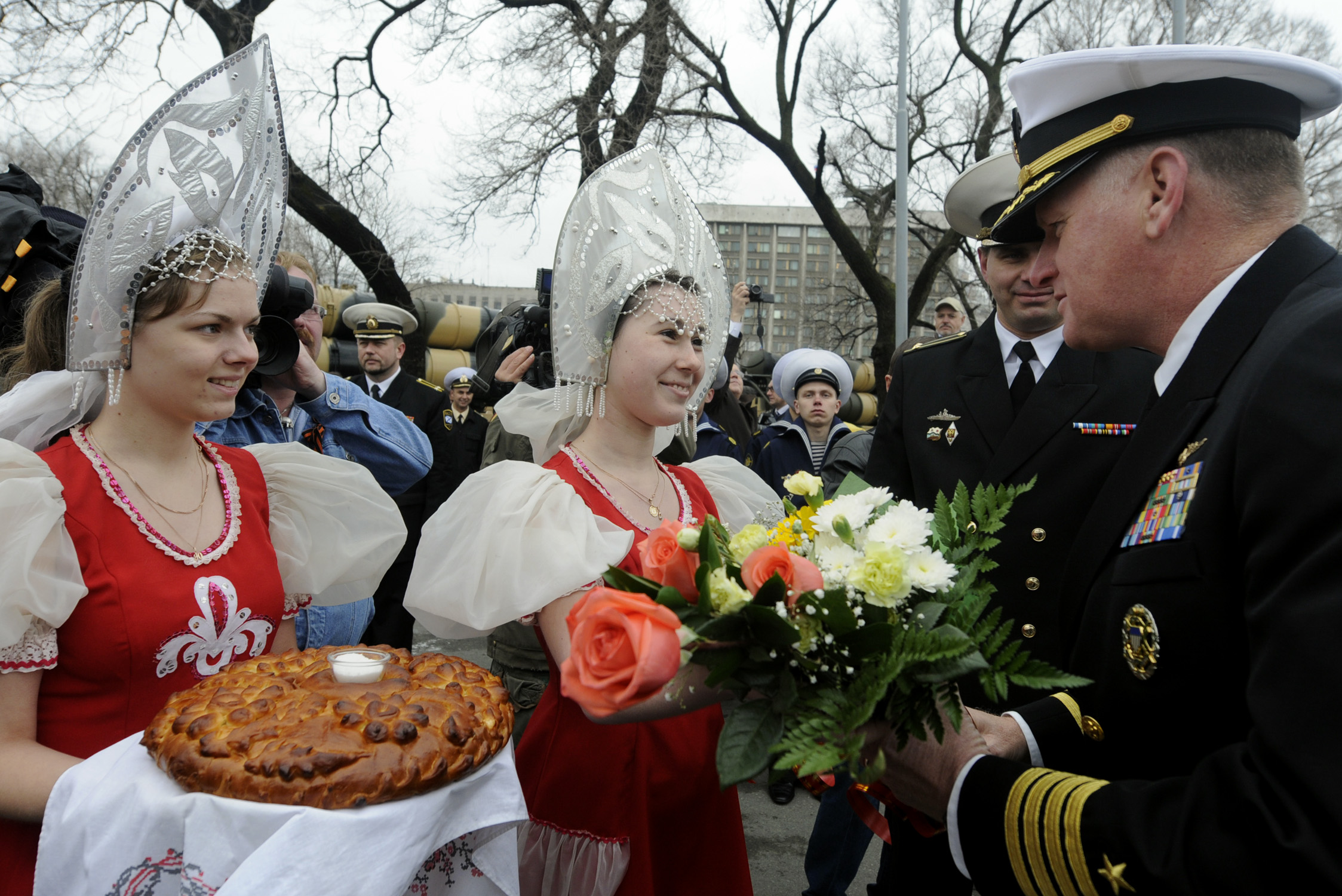
Capt. Rudy Lupton, commanding officer of the U.S. 7th Fleet command ship USS Blue Ridge (LCC 19), takes part in a bread and salt ceremony in Vladivostok, Russia.

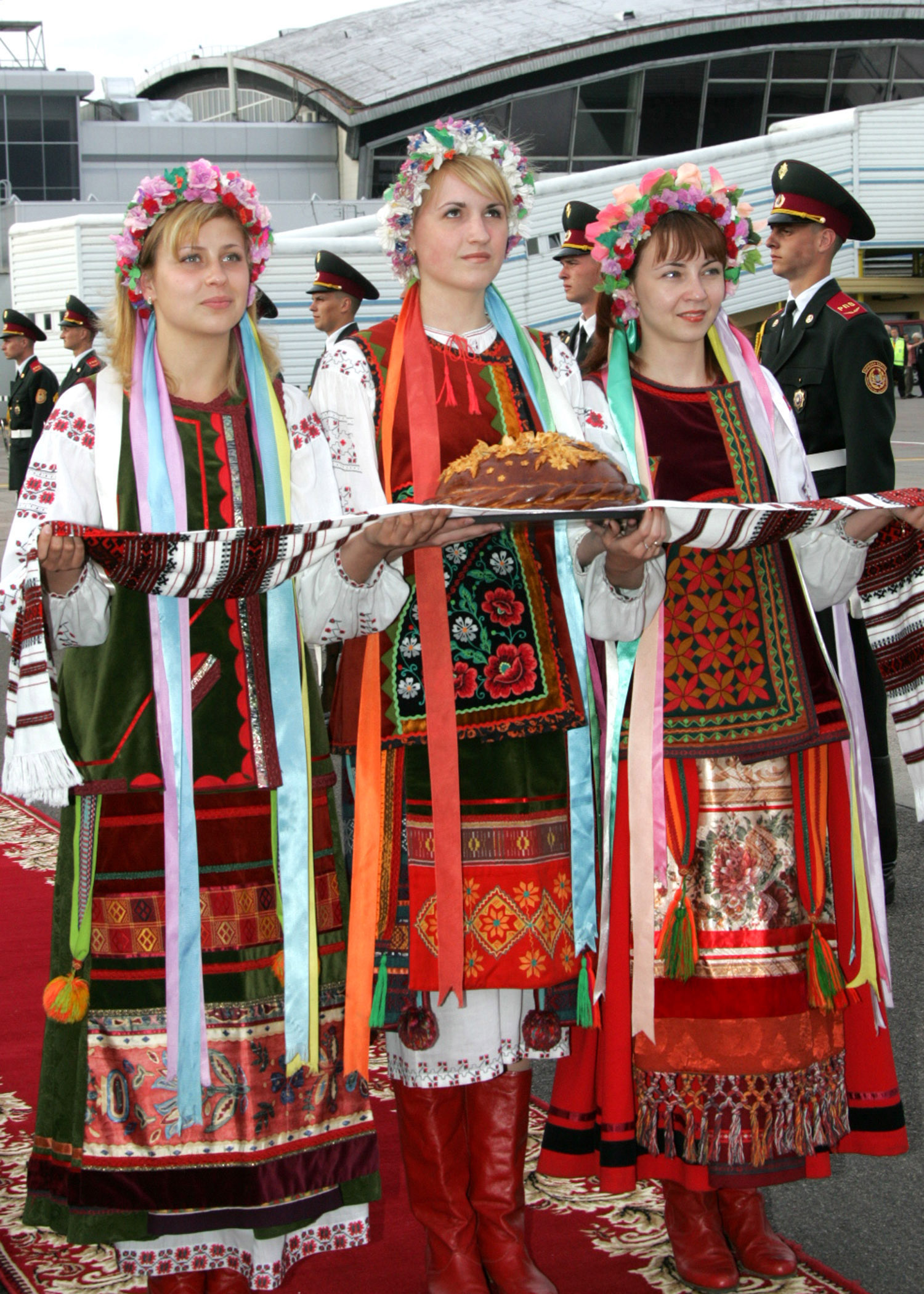
The Ukrainian girls with bread and salt to accord the traditional welcome to the President Dr. A.P.J. Abdul Kalam in Kyiv

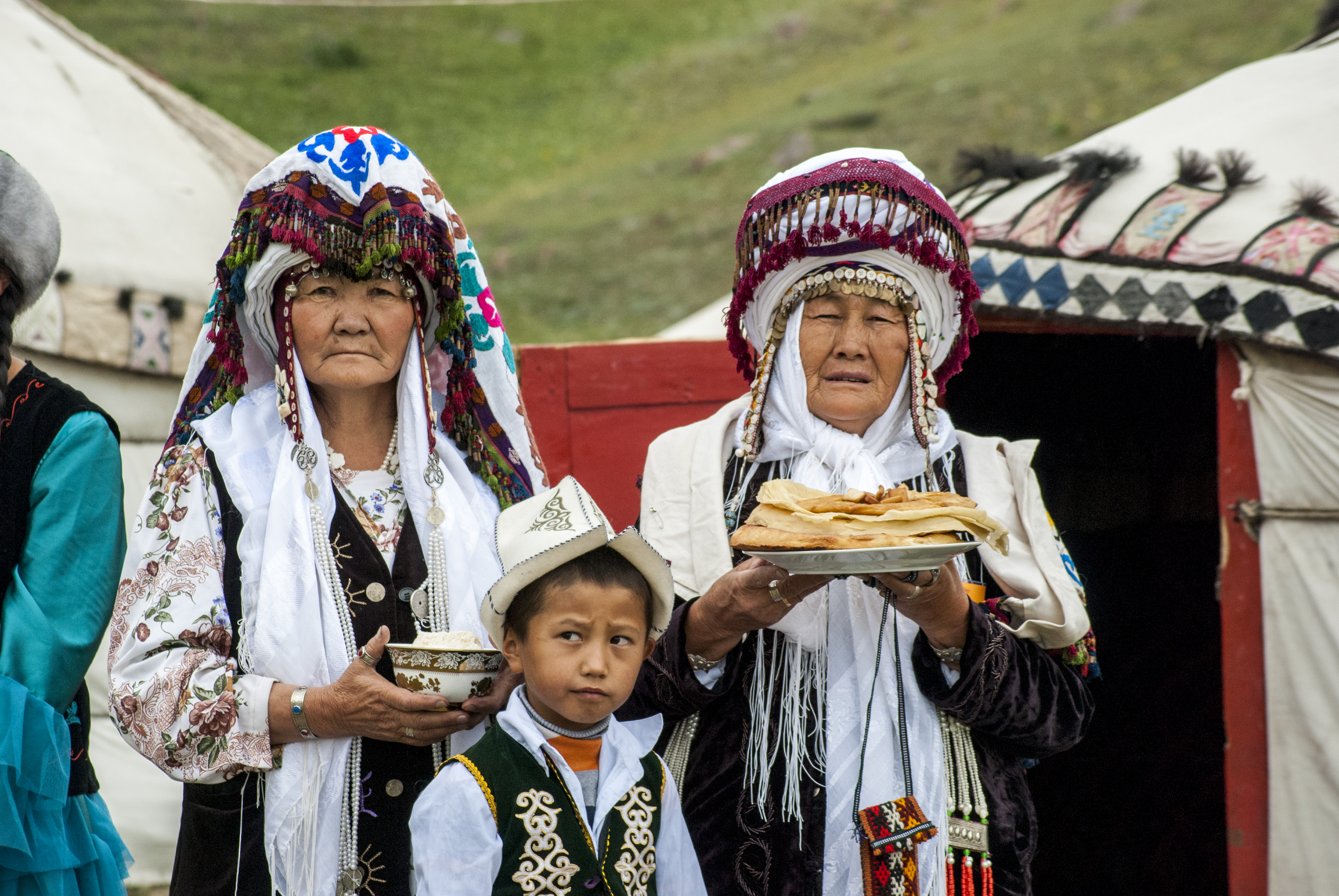
Kyrgyz women and child offering bread and salt on the opening of the National Horse Games

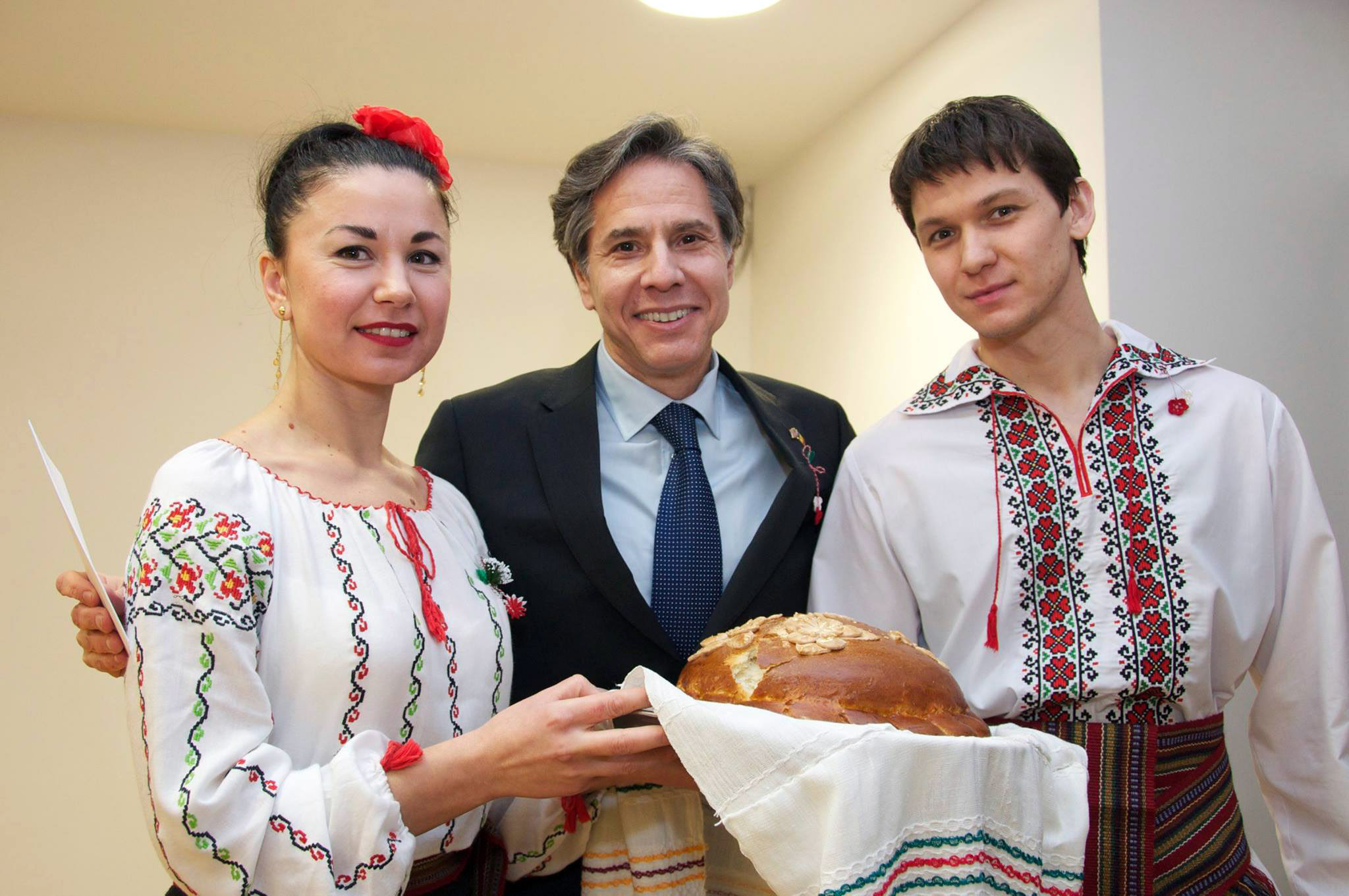
Antony Blinken is welcomed to the Embassy Chisinau community with the offering of traditional Moldovan bread and salt in March 2015.

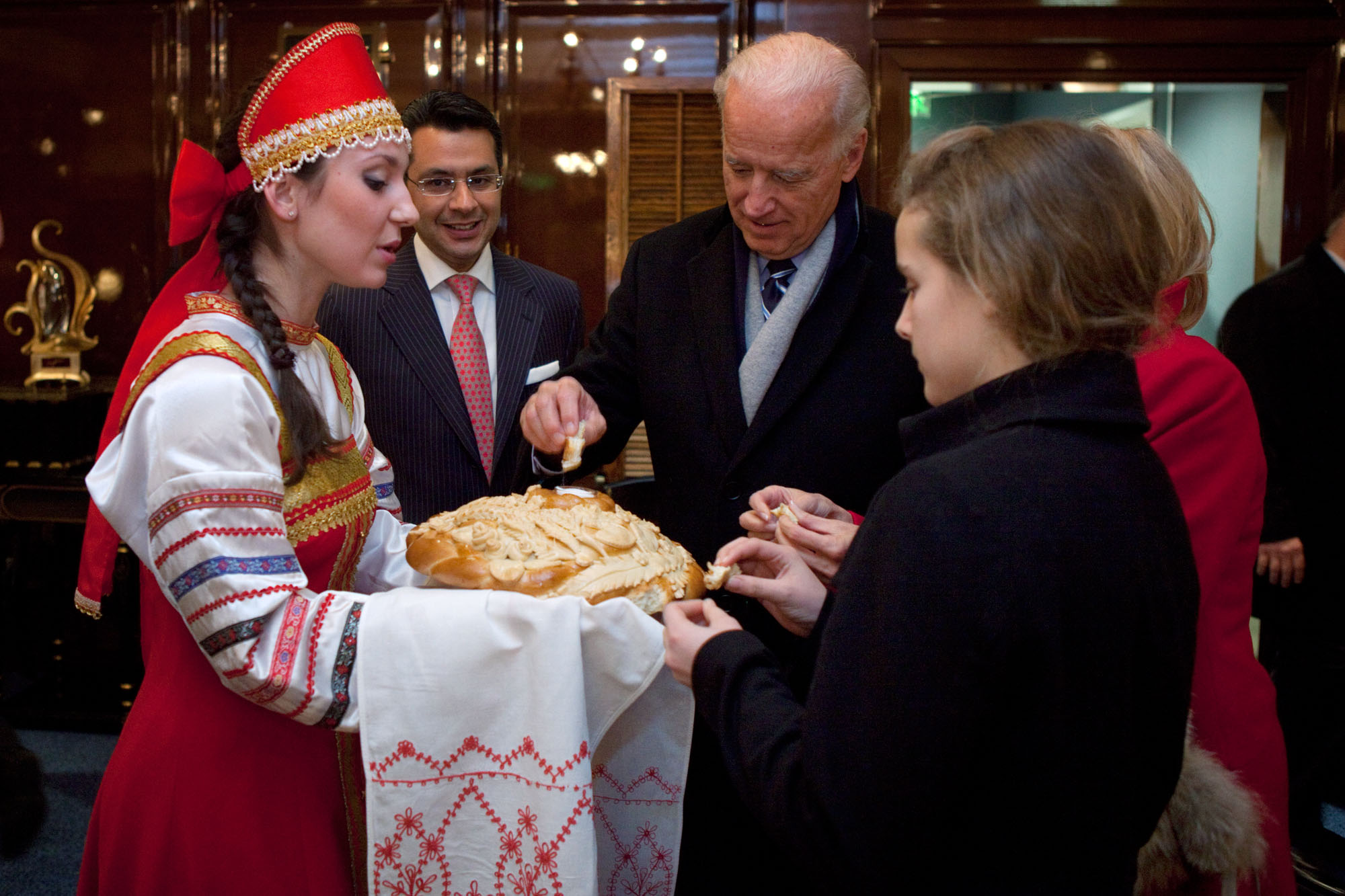
Joe Biden, Jill Biden, and Finnegan Biden participate in a bread and salt welcoming ceremony in the Ritz Carlton hotel in Moscow, Russia, March 8, 2011.

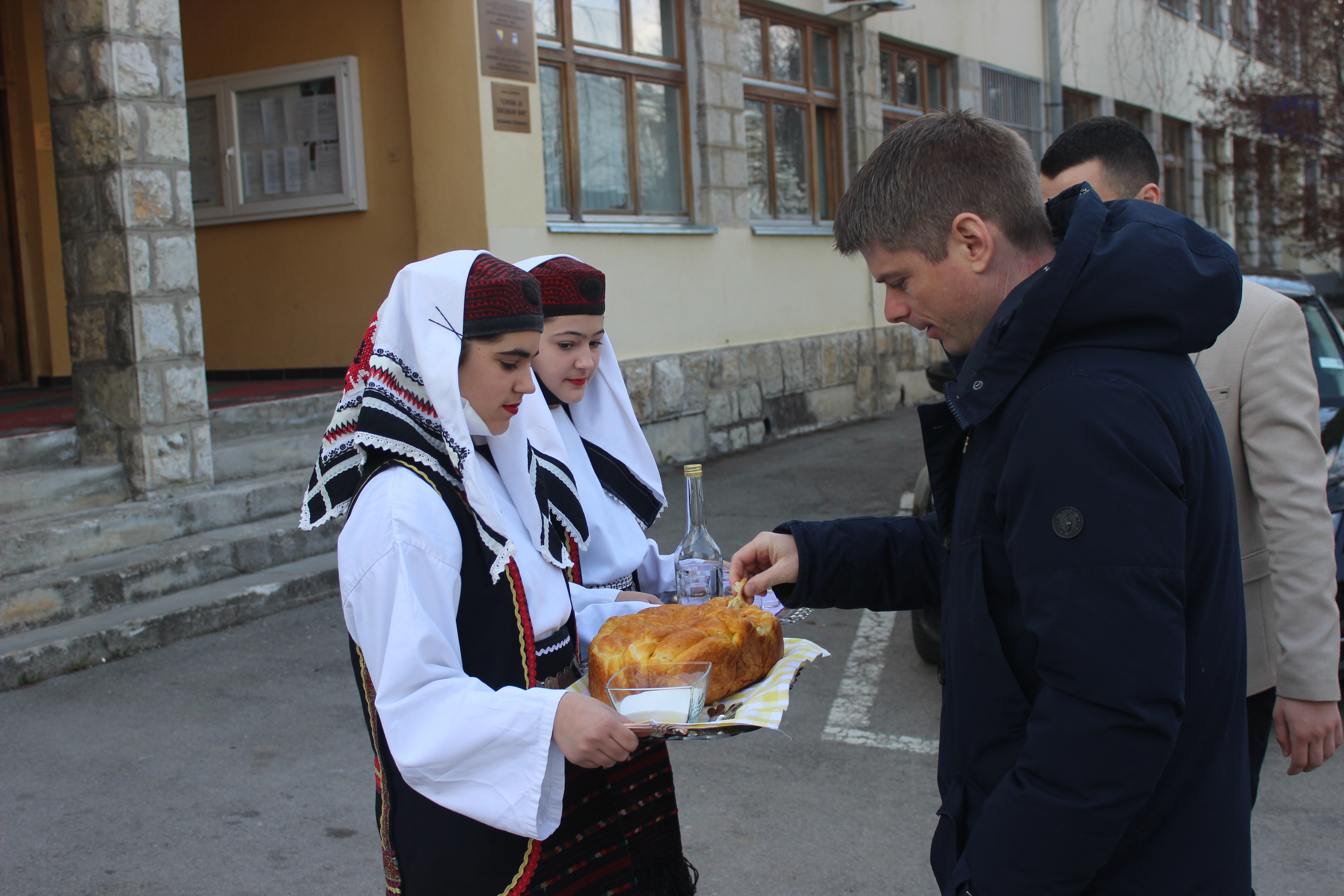
Arnaud Gouillon, the Director of the Directorate for Cooperation with the Diaspora and Serbs in Bosanski Petrovac during his visit to Serbs in the Federation of BiH

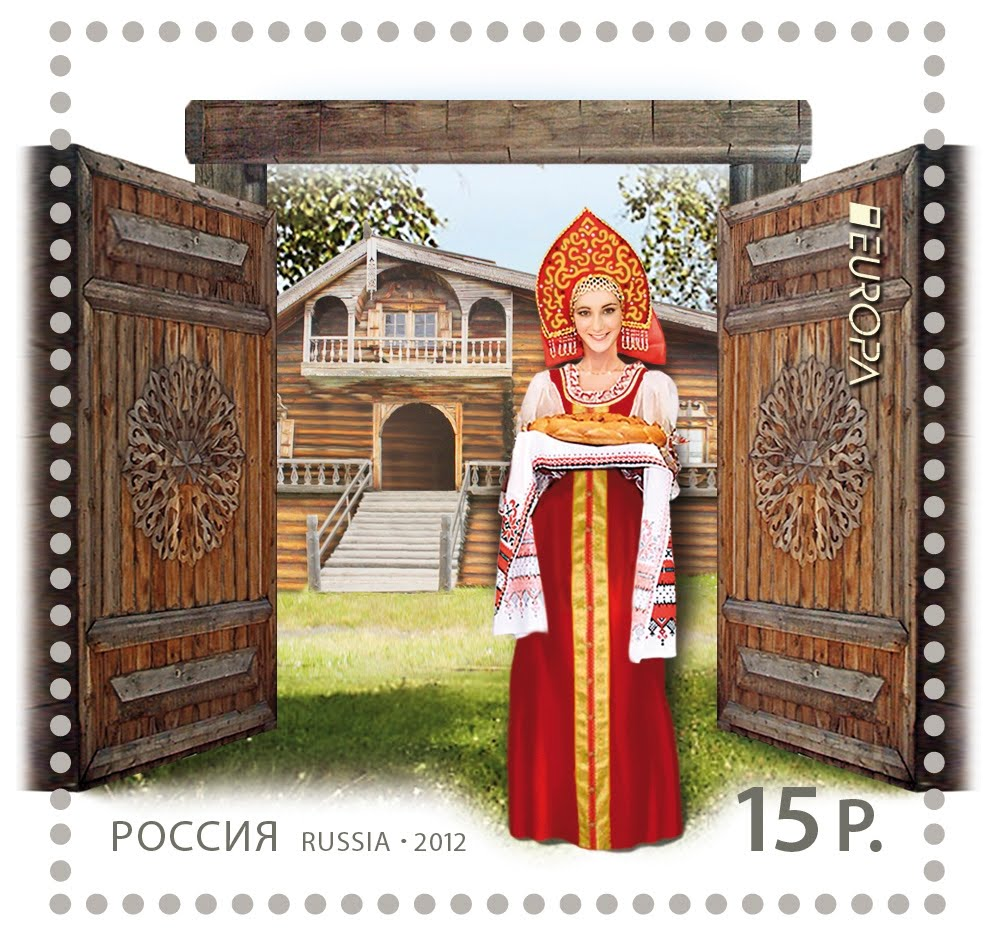
2015 Russian stamp depicting a young woman in a sarafan and a kokoshnik welcoming guests with bread and salt

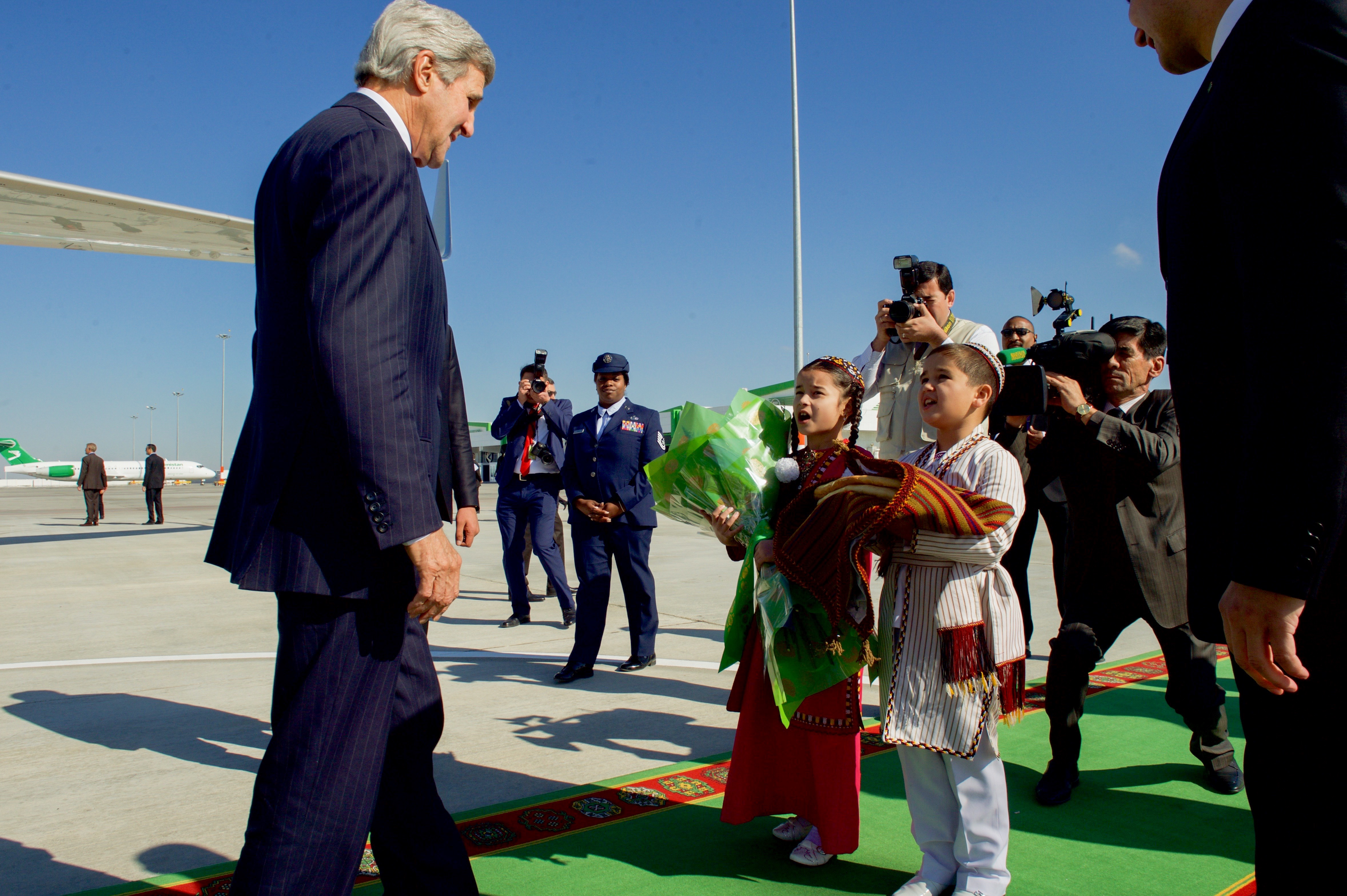
John Kerry approaches two children bearing a traditional greeting of bread and salt as he arrives at Ashgabat International Airport in Ashgabat, Turkmenistan, on November 3, 2015.

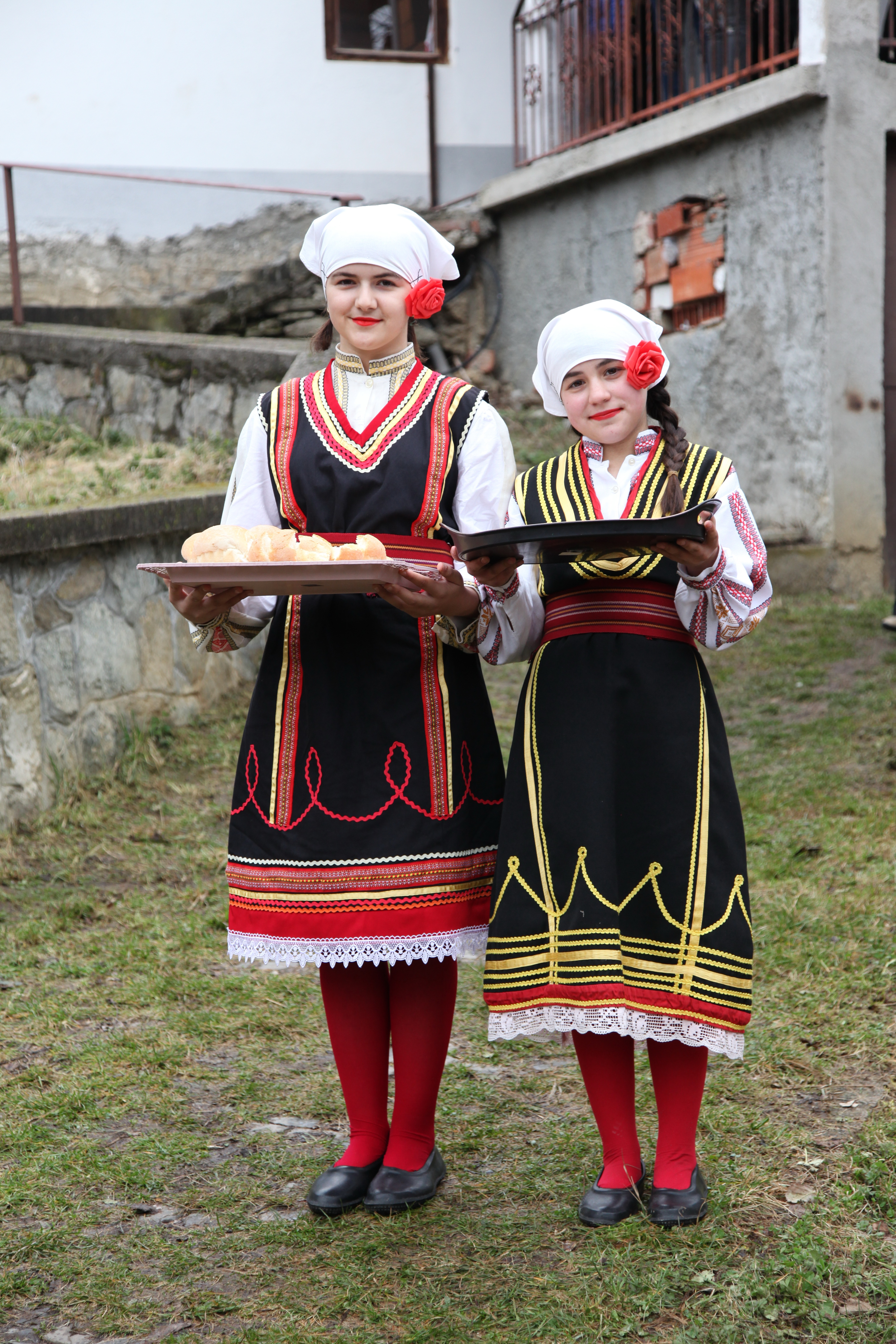
Two girls dressed in traditional costume wish a traditional welcome with bread and salt to the guests in the village of Konopnica, North Macedonia.

== Bibliography ==
- Smith, R. E. F.; Christian, David (1984). Bread and Salt: A Social and Economic History of Food and Drink in Russia. Cambridge University Press. ISBN 0-521-25812-X.
