= Konopnica =

Konopnica may refer to the following places:

- Konopnica, Poddębice County in Łódź Voivodeship (central Poland)
- Konopnica, Rawa County in Łódź Voivodeship (central Poland)
- Konopnica, Lublin Voivodeship (east Poland)
- Konopnica, Wieluń County in Łódź Voivodeship (central Poland)
- Konopnica (Vlasotince) in southern Serbia
- Konopnica, Kriva Palanka in North Macedonia
