= Baklava (band) =

World music acoustic band

- Genres: world music
- Years active: 2005–present

Baklava (Macedonian: Баклава) is a world music acoustic band from Skopje, North Macedonia, which has released several albums focusing on traditional Balkan sounds with modern, often jazz-influenced, arrangements. Their key challenge is to create original music based on the aesthetic achievements of traditional Macedonian music. The band held several concerts in Europe and participated in several festivals, including the renowned Skopje Jazz Festival, Sfinks Festival in Belgium and other countries.

As band describes their music in Spotify: "We build a specific sound of World music. Because we play, travel, explore strange new worlds and boldly go where no sweet pastry has gone before!"

== Band members ==
- Elena Hristova, vocals
- Aleksandar Stamatov, tambura
- Nikola Nikolov, tambura
- Dejan Sibinovski, daf and other percussions

== Discography ==
- Baklava (2006)
- Kalemar (2008)
- Me Mankas Mucho (2011)
- From Skopje With Love (2023)
