= Bodan Arsovski =

Macedonian bass guitarist (born 1956)

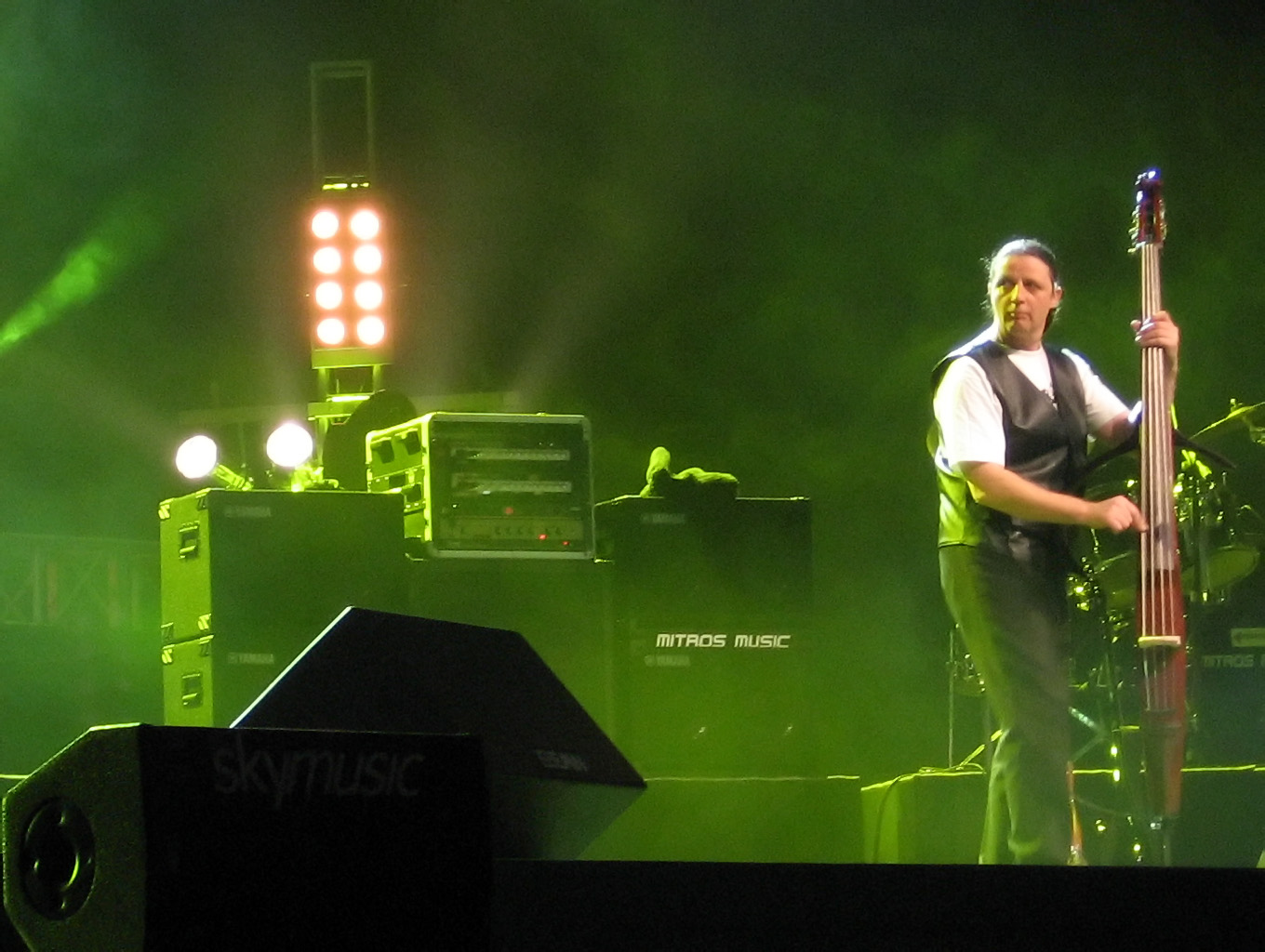

Background information
- Born: April 22, 1956 (age 70); Kumanovo, Macedonia, Yugoslavia
- Genres: Ethno jazz; instrumental rock; jazz fusion; progressive rock
- Instrument: Bass guitar
- Labels: PGP-RTS; Jugoton; Ezigja
- Member of: Leb i sol; Ezigja Orchestra
- Website: Official website

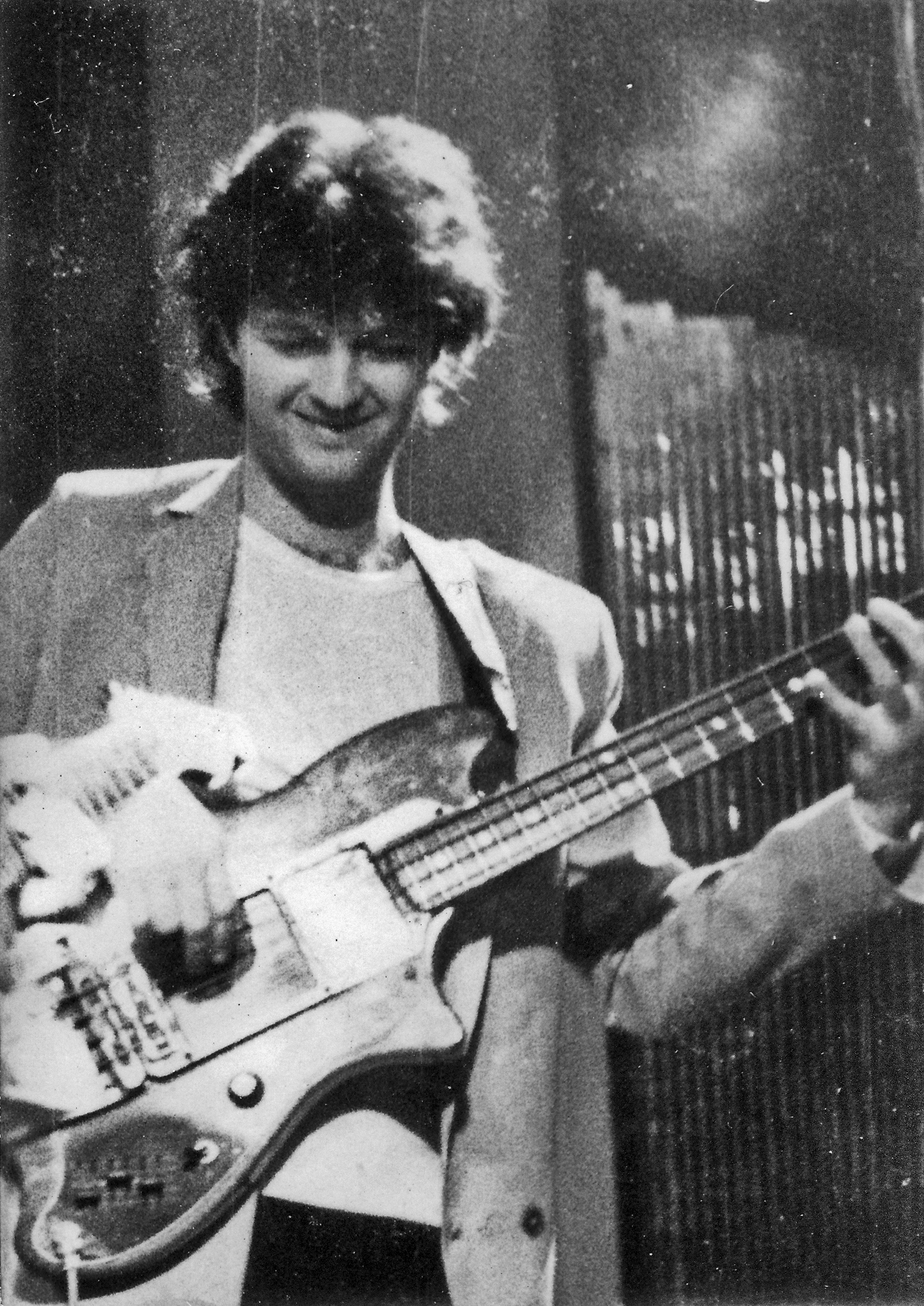
Bodan Arsovski at a concert at the Music Club in Niš, Serbia), 1981

Bodan Arsovski (born 22 April 1956) is a Macedonian bassist and a core founding member of the rock group Leb i sol, one of the most important rock bands in the former Yugoslavia. He is the only band member to have played on every Leb i sol record. He also released four solo albums.

== Biography ==
Arsovski was born in Kumanovo on the north of today's Macedonia. However, early in his life, his family moved to Skopje, state's capital, where he soon after met Vlatko Stefanovski, with whom he founded the legendary Yugoslav band Leb i Sol. Before Leb i Sol, all band members played together in Miki Petkovski's band Breg. As a solo artist, he has released four albums, two of them in collaboration with the Ezgija Orchestra. In addition, he recorded with original Leb i sol keyboardist Nikola Kokan Dimuševski a reworking of band material in a release titled (in English) "Sketches From the Past." All About Jazz called the album "warm, dark and stunning in its stark presentation."

== Playing style ==
Arsovski's style, both solo and with Leb i sol, mixes traditional Macedonian rhythms, melodies and instruments with modern rock sensibilities. The ethnic influence is more apparent in his solo albums than on many of Leb i sol's later, pre-2006 reunion recordings. He composed four of nine total tracks on I taka nataka, a Leb i sol album featuring a different line up from its earlier incarnations as well as some guests like Peca Atanovski and a Serbian actor Sergej Trifunović.

== Discography ==
=== Recordings with Leb i sol ===
- Leb i sol (1978)
- Leb i sol 2 (1978)
- Ručni rad (1979)
- Beskonačno (1980)
- Sledovanje (1981)
- Akustična trauma (1982)
- Kalabalak (1983)
- Tangenta (1984)
- Zvučni zid (1986)
- Kao kakao (1987)
- Putujemo (1989)
- Live in New York (1991)
- Live in Macedonia (2006)
- I taka nataka (2008)

=== Solo albums ===
- Endless View (1995)
- Tiresias (1998)
- Broken Beats (1999)
- Elegija (with Ezgija Orchestra)

=== With Vlatko Stefanovski ===
- Zodiac (1990)

=== With Nikola Kokan Dimuševski ===
- Sketches from the past (2006)
