= Tangenta =

Studio album by Leb i sol
- Released: October 1984
- Recorded: September 1984
- Studio: Aquarius, Belgrade
- Genre: Rock
- Label: Jugoton
- Producer: Kevin Ayers

Leb i sol chronology
| Kalabalak (1983) | Tangenta (1984) | Zvučni zid (1986) |

Tangenta (eng. Tangent) is the seventh studio album by Macedonian band Leb i sol. The album was released in 1984 for Jugoton and it was originally available on cassette and vinyl. The reissue of the album on CD was released in 2006 box set by Croatia Records.

== Background ==
After huge success of Kalabalak in 1983, 66% of band including Vlatko himself, had gone to do military service. After that, group reunited for the new album.

Album received mixed reviews and concerts were least visited than earlier years.

Biggest hit from this album is "Kontakt je skup" (Contact is expensive).

== Album ==
The material was recorded in the Belgrade studio Aquarius, and the producer was Kevin Ayers. It was Ayers who gave the album the name Tangenta, and the reason was that the group's music touched on different styles. The biggest hit from this album is the track Contact is expensive. Guests on the album were Laza Ristovski (keyboards) and Nenad Jelić (percussion).

The cover art for this album was considered one of the worst covers ever, because the frontman's mother died during the recording.

== Track list ==
All tracks are written by Leb i sol.

| No. | Title | Length |
|---|---|---|
| 1. | "30 minuta do kuće" | 4:12 |
| 2. | "Kontakt je skup" | 4:04 |
| 3. | "Shoes for Joanna" | 3:14 |
| 4. | "Samarkand" | 3:28 |
| 5. | "Tako blizu" | 4:35 |
| 6. | "Pretposlednji waltz" | 4:38 |
| 7. | "Laku noć" | 4:40 |
| 8. | "Tumba, tumba" | 4:40 |
| 9. | "Ženama" | 4:09 |
| Total length: | | 37:40 |
