= Putujemo =

Studio album by Leb i sol
- Released: May 1989
- Genre: rock
- Label: Jugoton

Leb i sol chronology
Kao kakao (1987)	Putujemo (1989)	I taka nataka (2008)

Putujemo (lit. "We're traveling") is the tenth album by the Macedonian band Leb i sol. The album contains nine songs, including the hits "Čukni vo drvo", title track and "Istok-zapad (telepatski)". The album was released in 1989 by Jugoton.

== Background ==
After the success of the previous album, the group recorded material for the next album. Before that, the group performed at the closing of the 1987 Universiade in Zagreb.

In the meantime, Stefanovski was a guest on the albums of Željko Bebek and the Film.

== Album ==
All songs are performed vocally. The producer of this album is Bratislav "Braco" Zafirovski. The author of 8 songs is the frontman himself, while the song "Sumorno proleće" was composed by Arsovski and the lyrics were written by Goran Stefanovski. The guests on the album were singer Kaliopi (backing vocals), Zoran Jovanović (saxophone and clarinet), Goce Micanov (saxophone) and Kire Kostov (horn). Album was recorded about 200 studio hours.

Due to Vlatko's wedding in February 1989, the recording of the album was delayed for couple days.

== Charts ==
Chart	Peak position
Ritam	4
