= Garabet Tavitjan =

Macedonian drummer of Armenian descent (born 1953)

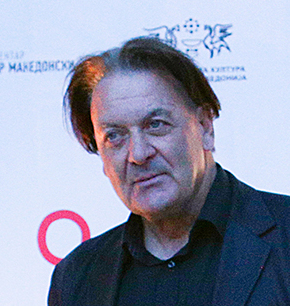

Background information
- Born: Garabet Tavitjan; 26 June 1953 (age 72)
- Origin: Skopje, North Macedonia
- Genres: Progressive rock ⋅ jazz-rock ⋅ ethno-jazz ⋅ folk rock
- Occupations: Musician, Songwriter
- Instrument: Drums
- Years active: 1976–present
- Website: Tavitjanbrothers - Garo & Paramecium

Garabet Tavitjan (Macedonian: Гарабет Тавитјан) is a Macedonian drummer of Armenian descent who has been a member of the rock group Leb i sol. He is considered the most acclaimed Macedonian drummer.

== Discography ==
- Гаро и Парамециум Live (МКП, МРТВ 1995)
- Live (SJF Records 1995)
- Гарабет Тавитијан (Gemini 2 1996)
- А бре, Македонче (Matav 2001)
