= Skopje Jazz Festival =

Jazz festival in Skopje, North Macedonia

- Genre: Jazz, Cuban, experimental
- Dates: October
- Locations: Skopje, North Macedonia
- Coordinates: 42°0′N 21°26′E
- Years active: 1982–present
- Website: skopjejazzfest.com.mk

The Skopje Jazz Festival is a jazz festival held in Skopje, North Macedonia, since 1982.

Although the festival promotes a genre which seems distant from its own culture and traditions, it attracts large audiences and receives attention in the Balkans and the rest of Europe. Musicians who have performed at the festival include Marshall Allen, Art Ensemble of Chicago, Anthony Braxton, Brazilian Girls, Ray Charles, Zoran Madzirov, Stanley Clarke, Ornette Coleman, Chick Corea, Al Di Meola, Gotan Project, Charlie Haden, Herbie Hancock, Andrew Hill, Dave Holland, Maria Joao, D. D. Jackson, Rabih Abou-Khalil, Vlatko Stefanovski, Theodosii Spassov, Simon Kiselicki, John McLaughlin, Pat Metheny, Youssou N'Dour, Tito Puente, Gregory Porter, Toni Kitanovski, Sierra Maestra, Goce Stevkovski, McCoy Tyner, and Joe Zawinul.

The festival is part of the European jazz network and the European Forum of World Music festivals.
