= Kao kakao =

Studio album by Leb i sol
- Released: March 30, 1987
- Recorded: December 1986–February 1987
- Studio: Studio M-2, Skopje
- Genre: Rock
- Label: Jugoton
- Producer: Vlatko Stefanovski; Bodan Arsovski

Leb i sol chronology
Zvučni zid (1986)	Kao kakao (1987)	Putujemo (1989)

Kao kakao (eng. Like Cocoa) is the ninth album by Macedonian rock group Leb i sol. It contains nine songs. Biggest hits from this album are Mamurni ljudi (Hungover again), Čuvam noć od budnih (Night watchman), Čekam kišu (I'm waiting for the rain)… It was released in 1987 by Jugoton. The album was accompanied by videos for the Mamurni ljudi and Skopje (recorded in Macedonian for the first time).

In 1999, album won Porin Award for Best Reissue. In 2006, Jugoton successor Croatia Records released this album on CD as part of Leb i sol box set.

In January 2023, album was released on 180-gram vinyl. Material is half speed remastered at Abbey Road Studio in London.

== Background ==
During 1986, Vlatko Stefanovski and Bodan Arsovski composed the music for TV show Bušava azbuka (eng. Shaggy alphabet). Bastion member Ana Kostovska performed songs along with them. Goce Micanov and another Bastion member, Kiril Dzajkovski joined the group. Drummer Garabet Tavitijan made comeback in group after 6 years.

By the end of 1987, Pokret magazine described that Vlatko got a hungover again because of being night watchman, adding that the world is like cocoa to him and that the only oasis is Skopje. In the following text, it is said that he met a femme fatale whom he regularly took to FC Vardar matches.

== Album ==
The album was recorded and mixed throughout the winter of 1986/87 in Skopje. For the first time, Vlatko used drum programming. Dzajkovski played keyboard and piano, and Goce Micanov played Tenor and Alt Saxophone. Lyrics for the song Femme fatale were written by Arsen Dedic with backing vocals by Bebi Dol. Vocals in song Autoput was performed by bassist Bodan Arsovski.

Album cover contains Ta Matete by Paul Gauguin.

== Track listing ==
All music is composed by Vlatko Stefanovski.

No.	Title	Length
1.	"Mamurni ljudi (Hungover people)"	4:21
2.	"Kao kakao (Like Cocoa)"	4:14
3.	"Femme Fatale"	4:05
4.	"Čuvam noć od budnih (Night watchman)"	5:39
5.	"Kriza tridesetih (Crisis of the thirties)"	3:42
6.	"Autoput (Highway)"	4:17
7.	"Igraj (Dance)"	4:21
8.	"Skopje"	2:31
9.	"Čekam kišu (Waiting for the rain)"	5:38

== Trivia ==
- Cover of 442 issue of magazine Start appears in music video for Mamurni ljudi.
- Croatian group Fali V covered Čuvam noć od budnih.
- In 2023, MRT released a TV movie called Kao kakao - The Taste of Success.

== Sound-alikes ==
- Song Skopje sampled Walk like an Egyptian by The Bangels. Skopje was sampled in song Soliter by Đorđe Balašević.
- Song Čuvam noć od budnih sampled Careless Whisper by Wham, but also sampled saxophone parts from Narodnjaci by Đorđe Balašević. Čuvam noć od budnih was sampled in Ja za ljubav neću moliti by Nina Badric.
- Title track sampled Izgledala je malo čudno by Bijelo dugme.
