= Leb i sol =

Macedonian rock band

Leb i sol Леб и сол
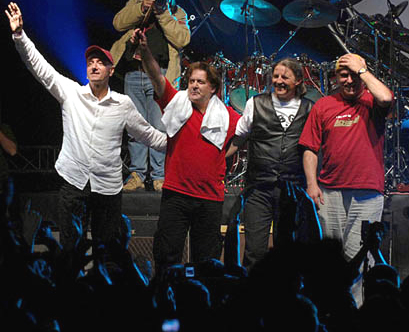
- Leb i sol in 2006

Background information
- Origin: Skopje, North Macedonia
- Genres: Jazz-rock; ethno-jazz; progressive rock
- Years active: 1976–1995; 2006–present
- Labels: PGP-RTB; Jugoton; Avalon Production; One Records; Croatia Records; PGP-RTS
- Spinoff of: YU Grupa
- Members: Mičo Božikov; Bodan Arsovski; Nikola Kokan Dimuševski; Mihail Parušev
- Past members: Vlatko Stefanovski; Kiril Džajkovski; Valentino Skenderovski; Dragoljub Đuričić; Dimitar Čočorovski; Garabet Tavitjan; Srđan Dunkić Johnny

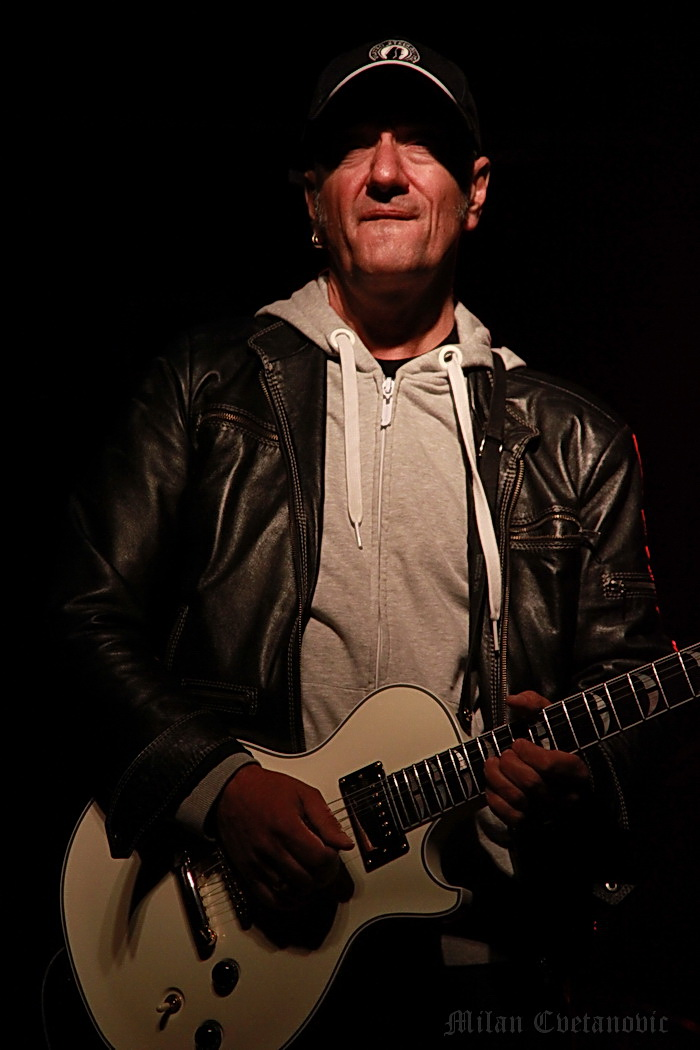
Vlatko Stefanovski (2011)

Leb i sol (Macedonian: Леб и сол, lit. 'Bread and Salt', pronounced [ˈlɛp ˌi ˈsɔl]) is a Macedonian and Yugoslav rock group founded in the 1970s by Vlatko Stefanovski (guitar), Bodan Arsovski (bass guitar), Nikola Kokan Dimuševski (keyboards) and Garabet Tavitjan (drums). Tavitjan ceded the drumwork to Dragoljub Đuričić for some of the albums, while Kiril Džajkovski replaced Kokan on Kao kakao (1987) and Putujemo (1989). Beside being the most eminent Macedonian band, they were also one of the most important acts of the Yugoslav rock scene.

== History ==
"Leb i sol" is a traditional greeting which literally translates to "bread and salt". Distinguished visitors to villages and communities would be offered a piece of home-baked bread and a dip of salt as a traditional welcome, which is where the name of the band comes from. Their music combined elements of rock, jazz fusion and ethnic Macedonian music. As the band matured, the jazz influences became less obvious. However, in concert, Leb i Sol performances of jazzed-up and lengthy versions of traditional ethno-folk classics such as "Jovano Jovanke" or "Aber Dojde Donke", were often received with great enthusiasm and cheer.

Leb i Sol were very popular in the 1970s and 1980s and, while not selling as many records as some pop and folk acts, were very well known and respected and often sold-out venues in most of the larger cities in Yugoslavia. The first two albums are often considered foundational, while most are diverse enough to be, at least in part, accessible to a fairly wide audience. The influence of folk music of Macedonia are recognizable in the use of odd meters (5/4, 7/8) and non-traditional scales (e.g. the Phrygian dominant scale). While all the musicians were fairly accomplished, Vlatko Stefanovski is frequently regarded as an exceptional guitar virtuoso.

=== Reunion ===
After splitting in 1995, the band members started successful solo careers and each of them released several solo albums. In 2006, Leb i Sol gathered again for a successful reunion tour across the entire former Yugoslavia to mark the thirtieth anniversary of their formation. Later, Vlatko Stefanovski left the group. With a new line-up, in 2008, the band recorded a new studio album titled I taka nataka. An international concert tour is being planned.

== Discography ==
- Leb i sol (PGP RTB, 1977)
- Leb i sol 2 (PGP RTB, 1978)
- Ručni rad (PGP RTB, 1979)
- Beskonačno (PGP RTB, 1981)
- Sledovanje (PGP RTB, 1981)
- Akustična trauma—Double Live (PGP RTB, 1982)
- Kalabalak (Jugoton, 1983)
- Tangenta (Jugoton, 1984)
- Zvučni zid (Jugoton, 1986)
- Kao kakao (Jugoton, 1987)
- Putujemo (Jugoton, 1989)
- Live Anthology -- Live in Kragujevac (1990)
- Live in New York—CD/cassette (1991)
- Anthology—Double CD compilation (1995)
- Live in Macedonia—CD/DVD (2006)
- I taka nataka—CD (Hammer production, 2008)
