= Konopnica, Kriva Palanka =

Konopnica Конопница
- Village
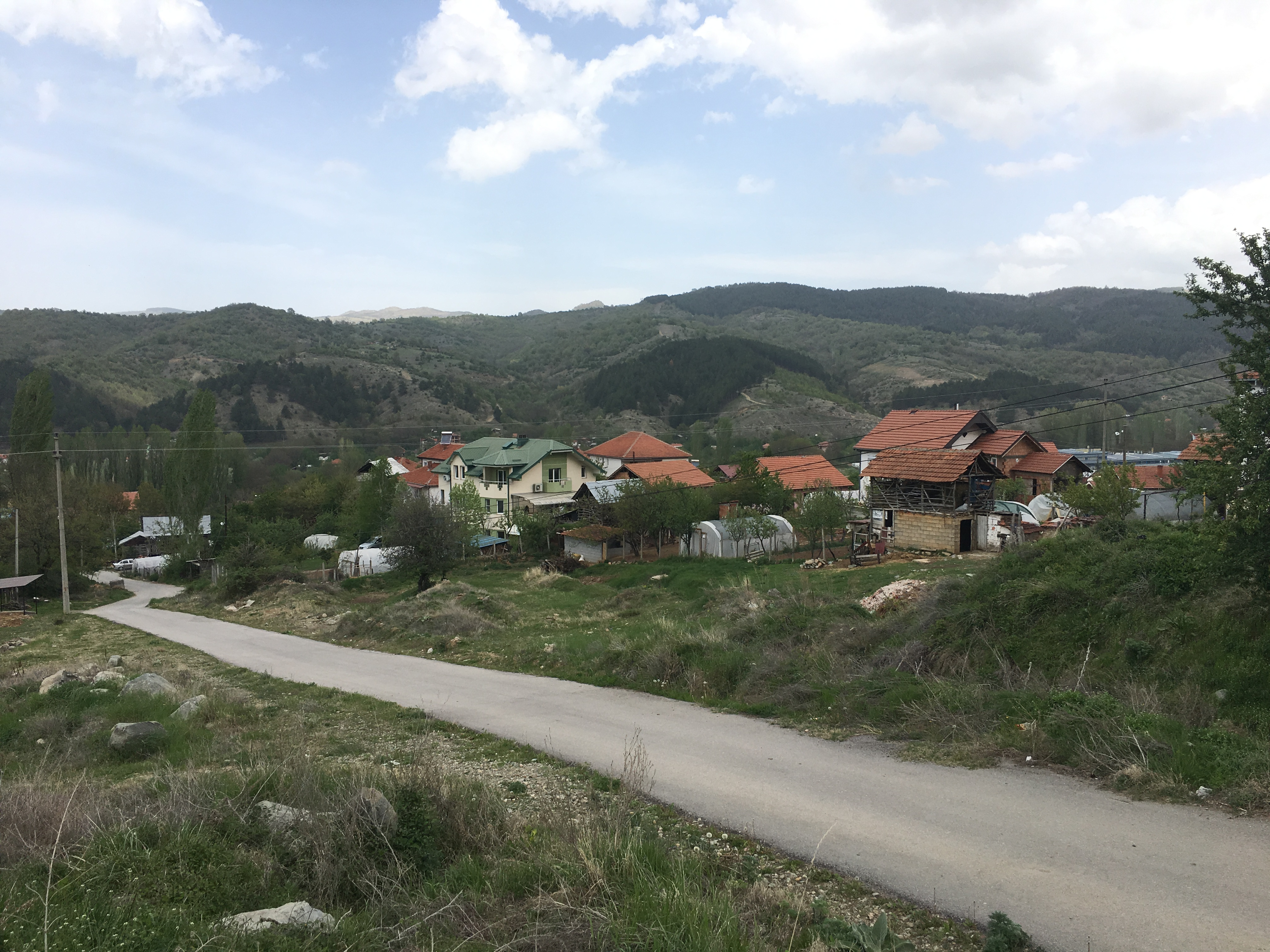
- View of the village

- Location within North Macedonia
- Coordinates: 42.185656°N 22.300148°E
- Country: North Macedonia
- Region: Northeastern
- Municipality: Kriva Palanka

Population (2002)
  - Total: 1,398
- Time zone: UTC+1 (CET)
  - Summer (DST): UTC+2 (CEST)
- Website: .

Konopnica (Macedonian: Конопница) is a village in the municipality of Kriva Palanka, North Macedonia. One of the largest settlements in the municipality, it is located just west of Kriva Palanka town.

== Demographics ==
According to the 2002 census, the village had a total of 1,398 inhabitants. Ethnic groups in the village include:

- Macedonians 1,395
- Serbs 2
- Other 1
