= Vlatko Stefanovski =

Macedonian musician

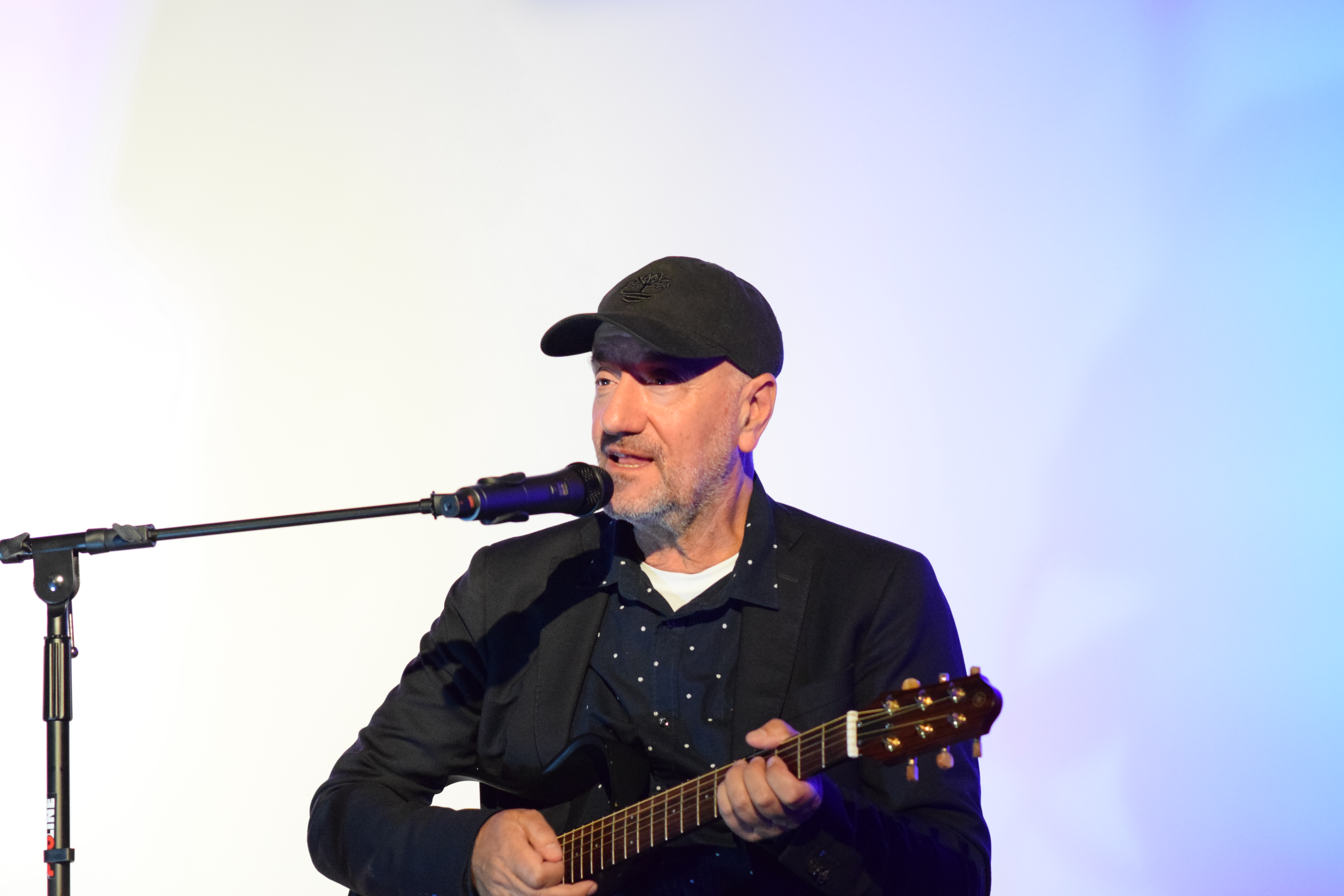
- Vlatko Stefanovski during a live performance

Background information
- Also known as: Vlatko
- Born: 24 January 1957 (age 69); Prilep, PR Macedonia, Yugoslavia (now North Macedonia)
- Genres: Ethno rock Instrumental rock Macedonian rock
- Instrument: Guitar
- Years active: 1974–present
- Labels: Third Ear; Croatia records
- Formerly of: Leb i sol
- Website: Official website

Vladimir "Vlatko" Stefanovski (Macedonian: Влатко Стефановски [ˈvɫatkɔ stɛ'fanɔfski]; born January 24, 1957) is a Macedonian ethno-rock guitar virtuoso.

== Biography ==
Vlatko was born into a typical theatrical family. His parents, as artists, often traveled, so soon Stefanovski moved to Skopje, in the neighborhood Taftalidze. Vlatko Stefanovski lives with his family (consisting of daughter Ana and son Jan) in Skopje. His son (Jan Stefanovski) is a drummer in V.S.Trio (from 2019).

Born in Prilep on 24 January 1957, he started playing guitar at the age of 13. Stefanovski was one of the founding members of Leb i sol with whom he recorded 13 albums between 1978 and 1991. He currently splits his time playing with his VS Trio, in an acoustic partnership with Miroslav Tadić or composing for film and theatre. Dramatist Goran Stefanovski was his older brother.

Stefanovski has played a wide variety of guitars, including a Gibson SG, Gibson Nighthawk, Scala VS-1(custom), Scala VSTII (custom), a Fender Stratocaster - heavily modified with Schecter and Radulović parts, a Telecaster, a Radulović super-strat and a Pensa-Suhr super-strat. The influence of ethnic and folk music of Southeastern Europe and more specifically of the Music of North Macedonia are recognizable in his occasional use of odd meters (5/4, 7/8) and non-traditional scales (e.g. the Phrygian dominant scale).

He played the guitar solo in the song "Za Milion Godina" by YU Rock misija, the former Yugoslav contribution to Bob Geldof's Band Aid.

== Career ==
=== Beginnings and the Invention of Ethno-Rock (1976–1979) ===
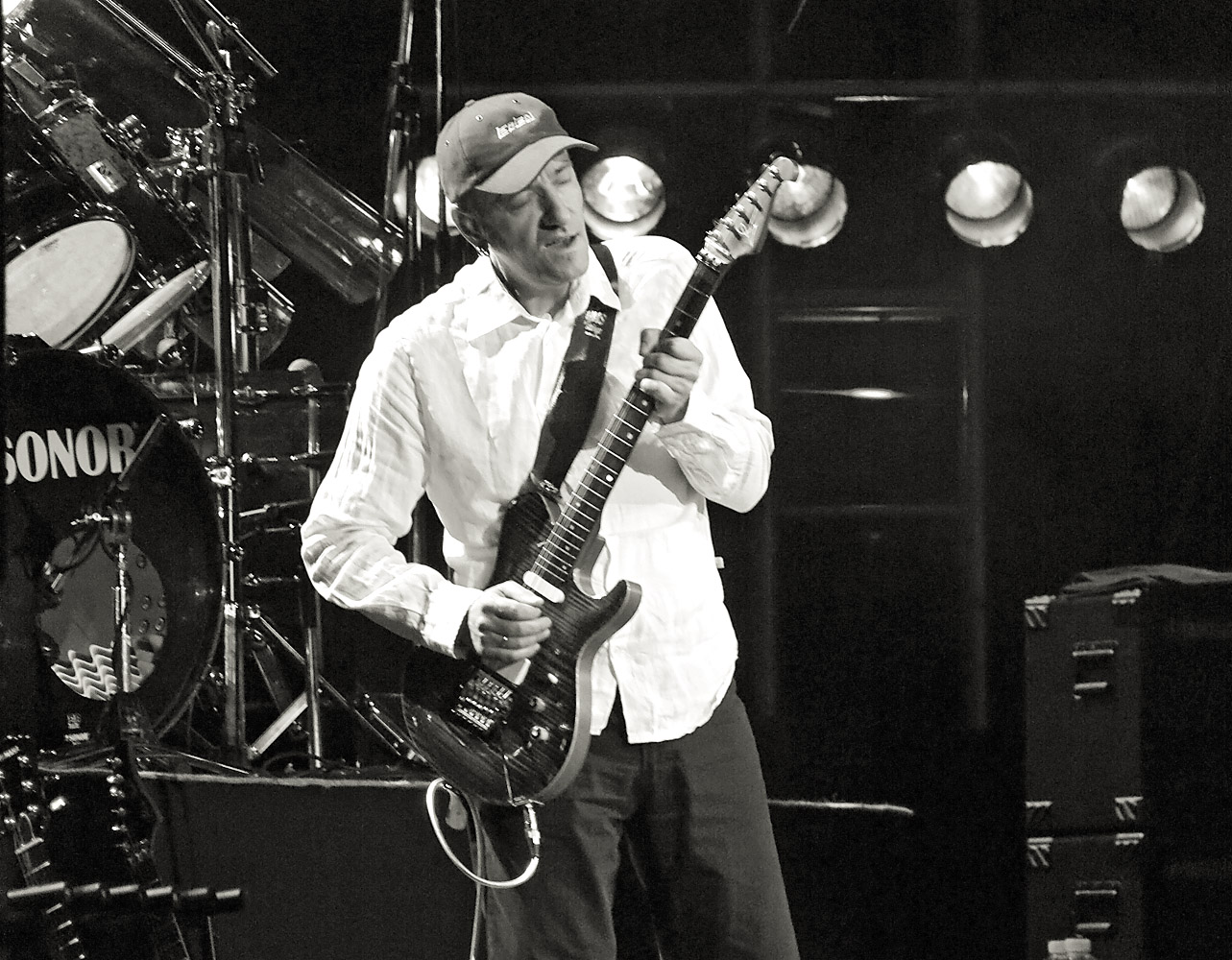
Stefanovski at concert with Leb i Sol in Sava Center in November 2006.

Stefanovski began to achieve fame in the Yugoslavian rock scene during his time with Leb i Sol, his third band. The band's first 1977 single Devetka/Nie Cetvoricata already showcased his guitar prowess, while Vlatko was still only 19 years old. They played their first major concert as an opening act for Bijelo Dugme, commonly regarded as Yugoslavia's most popular band. While the band was then virtually unknown, legend has it that the audience and Bijelo Dugme were both blown away by their performance of 'Kokoška' (Eng: 'Hen').

In his early years, Stefanovski was credited for inventing a style of music known as 'ethno-rock'. This style is characterized by a fusion of classic rock and roll with folk elements, in his case from his native Macedonia. This style dominates the first two albums, Leb i Sol 1 and Leb i Sol 2. Their third album, Ručni Rad (Eng: 'Hand-made') was a departure from this style into more of a jazz-rock fusion.

=== New Wave Phase (1980–1986) ===
After the departure of keyboardist Kokan Dimuševski from Leb i Sol, the band began to develop a new wave style more in line with Azra, Haustor, and other popular bands in Yugoslavia at the time. They maintained some elements of their earlier ethno style, as evidenced for example in their rendition of Macedonian folk son 'Ajde Sonce Zajde' on the album Beskonačno (Eng: 'Infinite').

=== Pop Rock Phase (1987–1991) ===
In the late 80s, Stefanovski began to take more artistic control over Leb i Sol, writing nearly all of their songs. These later albums used vocals on all songs, as opposed to their earlier albums, in which nearly every song was instrumental.

=== End of Leb i Sol & Solo Beginnings (1991–1995) ===
During this period, Stefanovski began working more on side projects, including composing scores for movies and plays, and collaborating with other musicians. During this time he toured with Leb i Sol, but the band did not release any new albums. The only new material they released was their rendition of Macedonian folk classic 'Uči me majko, karaj me' (Eng: teach me mother, scold me).

During this time, Stefanovski also released his first solo album, Cowboys & Indians. It received moderate critical acclaim. Some songs off the album still make regular appearances in his set lists today, including the title track and the ballad 'Kandilce'.

=== Folk Revival, VS Trio, and more Solo Works (1996–)& Equipment ===
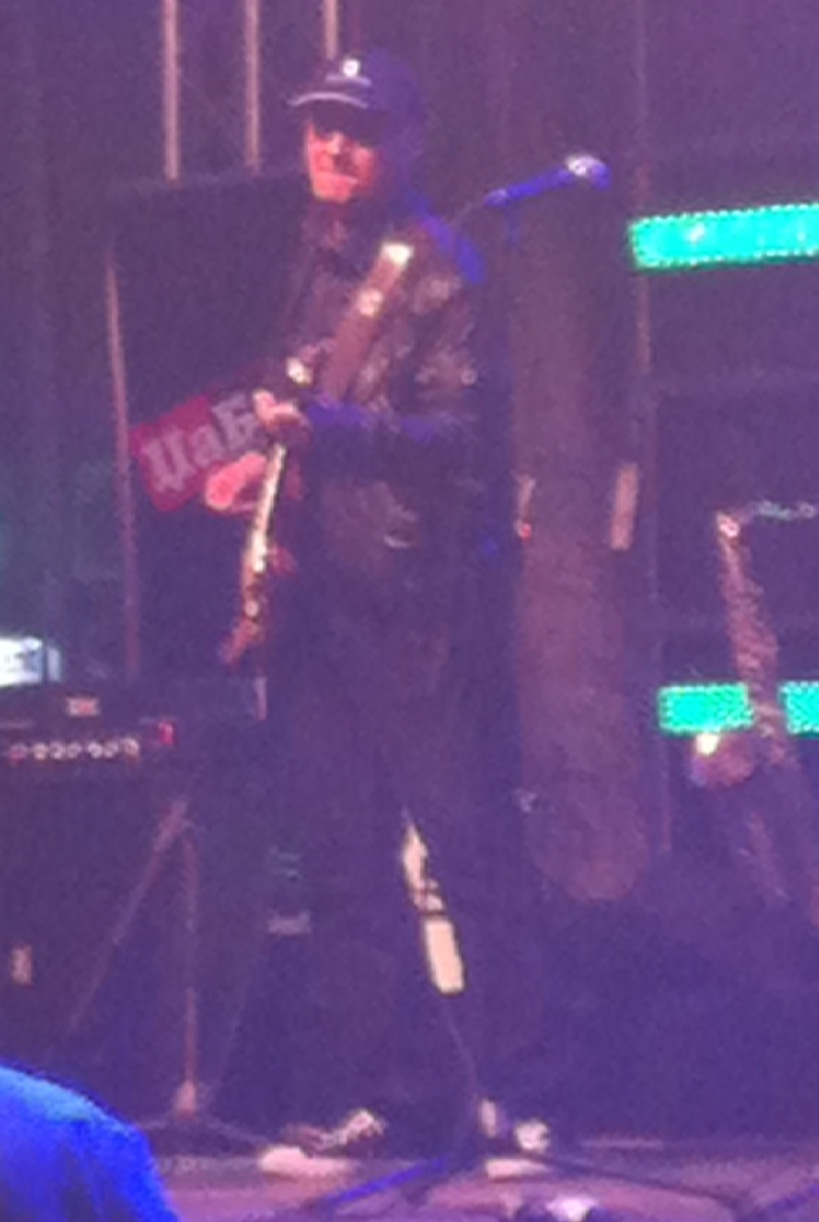
During a live performance in Kumanovo

Since leaving Leb i Sol, Stefanovski has used his newfound freedom to pursue a myriad of other musical projects. Since 1998, he has toured and played Macedonian folk songs exclusively with fellow guitarist Miroslav Tadić. Unlike his previous works, these have been played mostly on acoustic guitar.

Stefanovski went back to his early ethno-rock roots from Leb i Sol with his VS Trio. Their debut album in 1998 received great critical acclaim and helped define the new Vlatko Stefanovski sound. Stefanovski recorded several solo albums under his own name during this time period. The sound on these albums ranged from pop on 'Kula od Karti' (Eng: 'Tower of Cards') to pure blues on 'Thunder From the Blue Sky'.

In V.S.Trio from 2021 drummer is Jan Stefanovski, and bass Ivan Kukic.

In 2006, he did a reunion tour with Leb i Sol, touring the former Yugoslavian countries. After the tour, the band resumed without Stefanovski.

In 2012, Tommy Emmanuel, Stochelo Rosenberg and himself have formed a band called Kings of Strings, and have embarked on tour in mid-March.

=== Equipment ===
Vlatko Stefanovski has used a variety of guitars and amps. His favourite guitars include a Gibson Les Paul Custom 1959, a Gibson Nighthawk, a Gibson SG, the Fender Stratocaster, Telecaster, Pensa Suhr, Gibson L-5, and Radulovic guitars, Yamaha, Hamer, MK guitars signature and his main guitar, a Leo Scala Signature VS. The amps which he uses at concerts are: DV Mark Bad Boy, Vox AC30, Fender '57 Twin, MK signature VS Overdrive special, Fender Deluxe Reverb 57', Fender Hot Road Deville, and Marshall JCM800.

=== Effects ===
He doesn't use much in the way of effects but some of his main pedals are the Fulltone Full-Drive Mosfet 2 10th Anniversary, the Dunlop Crybaby, the Boss DD-7, the Boss CH-1, the Boss CS-3 and the Turbo Rat.

== Discography and work ==
=== Recordings ===
1. Kings of Strings(with Tommy Emmanuel & Stochelo Rosenberg)
2. Zodiac (with Bodan Arsovski - Third ear music -1990)
3. Cowboys & Indians (Third ear music -1994)
4. Sarajevo (Third ear music -1996)
5. Gypsy Magic (Third ear music -1997)
6. Krushevo (with Miroslav Tadić - MA recordings - 1998)
7. V. S. Trio (Third ear music - 1998)
8. Live in Belgrade (with Miroslav Tadić - Third ear music - 2000)
9. Journey to the Sun (IFR - Kalan -2000)
10. Kino Kultura (Third ear music -2001)
11. Kula od karti (Avalon Production -2003)
12. Treta majka (with Miroslav Tadić - Avalon Production -2004)
13. Thunder From The Blue Sky (with Jan Akkerman) (2008)

=== Film scores ===
- Šmeker (Zoran Amar, 1985)
- Za sreću je potrebno troje (Rajko Grlić,1986)
- Zaboravljeni (Darko Bajić,1989)
- Klopka (Suada Kapić,1990)
- Početni udarac (Darko Bajić,1991)
- Suicide guide (Erbil Altanaj,1996)
- Nebo gori modro (Jure Pervanje,1996)
- Gipsy magic (Stole Popov,1997)
- 3 Summer Days (Mirjana Vukomanović,1997)
- Journey to the Sun (Yesim Ustaoglu 1998)
- Skyhook (Ljubiša Samardžić, 2000)
- Serafim, the Lighthouse Keeper's Son (Vicko Ruić, 2002)

=== Ballet ===
1. Zodiac (with Bodan Arsovski 1989)
2. Vakuum (1996)
3. Dabova šuma (1998)

=== Educational TV Series ===
1. Busava Azbuka (1985)

=== Animated films ===
1. Cirkus (Darko Markovic, 1979) with LEB I SOL
2. Vjetar (Goce Vaskov, 1990)

=== Short films ===
1. Volim vodu (Goranka Greif Soro, 2002)

=== Recordings with Leb i sol ===
1. Leb i sol (PGP-RTB -1978)
2. Leb i sol 2 (PGP-RTB -1978)
3. Ručni rad (PGP-RTB -1979)
4. Beskonačno (PGP-RTB -1980)
5. Sledovanje (PGP-RTB -1981)
6. Akustična trauma (PGP-RTB - double live -1982)
7. Kalabalak (Jugoton -1983)
8. Tangenta (Jugoton -1984)
9. Zvučni zid (Jugoton -1985)
10. Kao kakao (Jugoton -1987)
11. Putujemo (Jugoton -1989)
12. Live in New York (Third ear music -1991)
13. Anthology (Third ear music -1995)

== Videos ==
- Youtube Search (vlatko+stefanovski)
- Youtube Search (vlatko+tadic)
- Youtube Search (vlatko+Pajduskoto)
- Vlatko Stefanovski trio - Čukni vo drvo
- Vlatko Stefanovski trio & Jan Akkerman - Hocus Pocus

Awards
Preceded by Van Gogh	Serbian Oscar Of Popularity; The Concert of the Year with Stefan Milenković; 2010	Succeeded by TBD
