= Sad je na mene red =

Studio album by Osvajači
- Released: 2015
- Genre: Hard rock
- Label: Grand Production
- Producer: Duffmusiq; Ivan Ilić; Marko Grujić; Darko Lukić

Osvajači chronology
Vrelina (2000)	Sad je na mene red (2015)	Beer Fest (Live) (2022)

Sad je na mene red (trans. It's My Turn Now) is the fourth studio album from Serbian and Yugoslav hard rock band Osvajači, released in 2019. Sad je na mene red is the first album released by the band after their 2005 reunion.

== Background and recording ==
Osvajači were formed in 1990 by Zvonko Pantović "Čipi" (vocals), Dragan Urošević (guitar), Saša Popović (bass guitar) and Miša Raca (drums), veteran keyboardist Laza Ristovski soon getting involved in the band's activity and becoming an official member. The original lineup released the band's debut album Krv i led (Blood and Ice) in 1991. Their following studio album, Sam (Alone), was recorded with the new keyboardist, Nebojša Jakovljević, and the new bass guitarist, Dejan Dačović, and released in 1995. After the release of the compilation album 1991 – 1995 in 1997, the original incarnation of the band split up. In 1998, Pantović and Jakovljević, with guitarist Bane Jelić, formed the pop rock band Osvajači All Stars. Simultaneously, Urošević reformed Osvajači, the new lineup featuring Saša Popović (who switched from bass to rhythm guitar), Nenad Jovanović (vocals), Saša Marković (bass guitar) and Nenad Branković (drums). For a period of time, existence of two bands of the same name, both featuring members from the original incarnation of the group, led to confusion of the public. However, most of the fans and the Serbian music press eventually started to consider Urošević-led faction of the band and their 2000 album Vrelina as the continuation of the original Osvajači activity, as it kept in spirit with the band's original hard rock sound, in contrast to Pantović's and Jakovljević's faction, which moved from rock towards pop and pop folk sound.

In 2005, Pantović, Urošević and Jakovljević reunited under the name Osvajači. The lineup also featured bass guitarist Mikica Zdravković (who was simultaneously a member of the punk rock band Čovek Bez Sluha) and the drummer Dejan Nikolić. The lineup performed for several years, playing material from Krv i led and Sam, before Urošević, Zdravković and Nikolić withdrew from the group, Pantović and Jakovljević continuing as Osvajači.

The album Sad je na mene red was recorded in the lineup featuring Zvonko Pantović (vocals), Nebojša Jakovljević (keyboards), Bane Jelić (guitar), Dejan Pejović (bass guitar) and Nenad Branković (drums), with Dragan Urošević making guest appearance on three songs. The album was recorded in eight different studios with four different producers. It included the English language version of the band's old ballad "S kim čekaš dan" ("Who Are You Waiting for the Day With"), entitled "I Would Just Give Up My Life", released as a bonus track.

== Track listing ==
No.	Title	Lyrics	Music	Length
1.	"Sad je na mene red" ("It's My Turn Now")	Zvonko Pantović	Nebojša Jakovljević	3:54
2.	"Korak po korak" ("Step by Step")	Zvonko Pantović	Nebojša Jakovljević; Zvonko Pantović	3:44
3.	"Tragovi" ("Traces")	Zvonko Pantović	Nebojša Jakovljević	3:41
4.	"Pakleni put" ("Hell Road")	Zvonko Pantović	Nebojša Jakovljević; Zvonko Pantović	3:45
5.	"Marija"	Zvonko Pantović	Nebojša Jakovljević; Zvonko Pantović	4:03
6.	"Sve što tebi nisam rekao" ("All that I Haven't Told You")	Zvonko Pantović	Nebojša Jakovljević; Zvonko Pantović	4:06
7.	"Kad ljubav postane navika" ("When Love Becomes a Habit")	Zvonko Pantović	Nebojša Jakovljević	4:06
8.	"Samoću znam" ("I Know Loneliness")	Zvonko Pantović	Nebojša Jakovljević	5:05
9.	"Glorija"	Zvonko Pantović	Nebojša Jakovljević	4:21
10.	"Voli me" ("Love Me")	Zvonko Pantović	Nebojša Jakovljević; Zvonko Pantović	4:17

Bonus track
No.	Title	Lyrics	Music	Length
11.	"I Would Just Give Up My Life"	Joe Kirin	Dragan Urošević	4:43

== Personnel ==
- Zvonko Pantović - vocals
- Nenad Jakovljević - keyboards, music arrangements
- Bane Jelić - guitar
- Dejan Pajović - bass guitar
- Nenad Branković - drums

=== Additional personnel ===
- Dragan Urošević - guitar (tracks: 2, 6, 7)
- Dušan Simović - guitar (track 10)
- Vladimir Avramović - guitar (track 10)
- Edi Duranović - guitar (track 11)
- Ashur Bandoleros - acoustic guitar (track 11)
- Dejan Nikolić - drums (track 10)
- Ana Popović - backing vocals (track 10)
- Ivana Pilja - backing vocals (track 11)
- Duffmusiq - producer (track: 1, 3)
- Ivan Ilić - producer (tracks: 2, 5, 6, 7, 8)
- Marko Grujić - producer (track 4)
- Darko Lukić - producer (tracks: 9, 10)
- Dragan Šuhart - design
- Danijela Pavlović - photography
