= Vrelina =

Studio album by Osvajači
- Released: 2000
- Studio: Audio Design Studio, Kragujevac
- Genre: Hard rock
- Length: 40:02
- Label: Take It Or Leave It Records
- Producer: Dragan Urošević; Aleksandar Marković

Osvajači chronology
The Best Of (1997)	Vrelina (2000)	Sad je na mene red (2015)

Vrelina (trans. Heat) is the third studio album from Serbian and Yugoslav hard rock band Osvajači, released in 2000. It is the only album by the second incarnation of the band, formed and led by the original Osvajači guitarist Dragan Urošević.

== Background and recording ==
Osvajači were formed in 1990 by Zvonko Pantović "Čipi" (vocals), Dragan Urošević (guitar), Saša Popović (bass guitar) and Miša Raca (drums), veteran keyboardist Laza Ristovski soon getting involved in the band's activity and becoming an official member. The original lineup released the band's debut album Krv i led (Blood and Ice) in 1991. Their following studio album, Sam (Alone), was recorded with the new keyboardist, Nebojša Jakovljević, and the new bass guitarist, Dejan Dačović, and released in 1995. After the release of the compilation album 1991 – 1995 in 1997, the original incarnation of the band split up.

In 1998, Pantović and Jakovljević, with guitarist Bane Jelić, formed the pop rock band Osvajači All Stars. Simultaneously, Urošević reformed Osvajači, the new lineup featuring Saša Popović (who switched from bass to rhythm guitar), Nenad Jovanović (vocals), Saša Marković (bass guitar) and Nenad Branković (drums). For a period of time, existence of two bands of the same name, both featuring members from the original incarnation of the group, led to confusion of the public. However, most of the fans and the Serbian music press eventually started to consider Urošević-led faction of the band as the continuation of the original Osvajači activity, as it kept in spirit with the band's original hard rock sound, in contrast to Pantović's and Jakovljević's faction, which moved from rock towards pop and pop folk sound.

In 1999, Urošević-led faction released the promo single "Samo ti" ("Only You"), with the ballad "Minut ćutanja" ("A Moment of Silence") as the B-side, announcing their new studio release. The recording of the album Vrelina featured the band's original keyboardist Laza Ristovski as guest musician. The album was co-produced by Urošević and Aleksandar Marković and released in 2000. It included the instrumental track "Voz za Jumu" ("Train to Yuma") and a cover of Rainbow song "Rainbow Eyes", entitled "Tragovi" ("Traces"). Soon after the album release, the band ended their activity.

== Track listing ==
All songs written by Dragan Urošević, except where noted.

No.	Title	Lyrics	Music	Length
1.	"Ona ima san" ("She Has a Dream")			2:52
2.	"Vrelina" ("Heat")			4:11
3.	"Još mnogo dana" ("Many More Days")			3:41
4.	"Minut ćutanja" ("Moment of Silence")			4:34
5.	"Gotova priča" ("Finished Story")			3:26
6.	"Lutati je najbolje što znam" ("To Wander Is the Best Thing I Know")			3:55
7.	"Ćutiš kao pre" ("You're Silent as Before")			4:12
8.	"Samo ti" ("Only You")			4:07
9.	"Voz za Jumu" ("Train to Yuma")			3:35
10.	"Tragovi" ("Traces")	Nenad Jovanović	Ritchie Blackmore	3:35

== Personnel ==
- Nenad Jovanović - vocals
- Dragan Urošević - guitar, producer
- Saša Popović - rhythm guitar
- Saša Marković - bass guitar
- Nenad Branković - drums

=== Additional personnel ===
- Laza Ristovski - keyboards
- Predrag Gajović - acoustic guitar (on track 10)
- Saša Nestorović - acoustic guitar (on track 10)
- Aleksandar Marković - producer
- Dobrica Andrić - recorded by, mixing
- Ivan Grujić - recorded by
- Ivan Banić - cover design
- Milan Timotić - photography
