= Osvajači =

Serbian and Yugoslav hard rock band

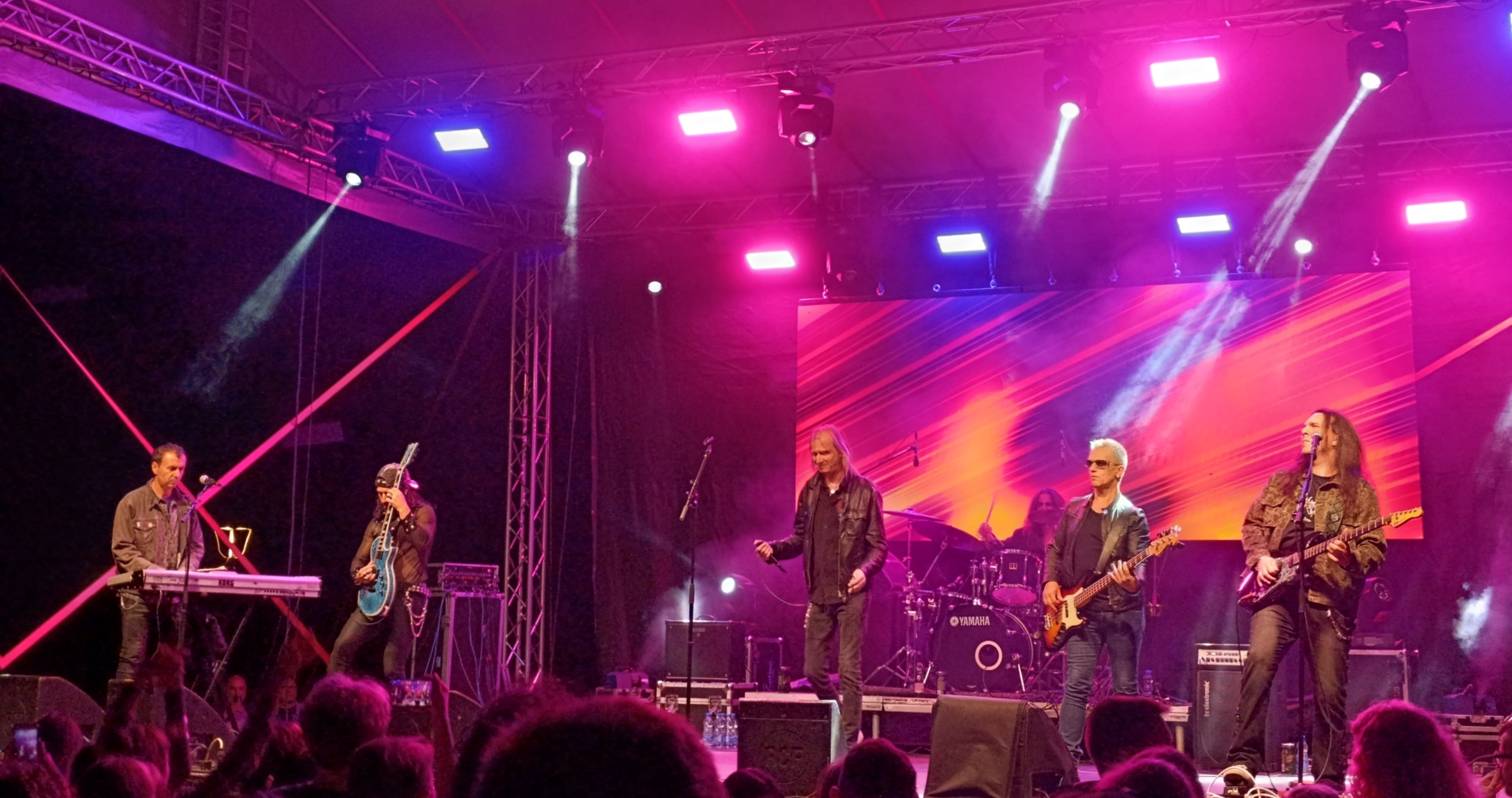
- Osvajači performing in 2025

Background information
- Origin: Kragujevac, Serbia
- Genres: Hard rock; glam metal; heavy metal
- Years active: 1990–1997; 1999–2000; 2005–present
- Labels: PGP-RTB, PGP-RTS, Take It Or Leave It Records, Grand Production
- Members: Zvonko Pantović; Nebojša Jakovljević; Nenad Branković; Emir Hot; Dušan Simović; Dejan Ilić
- Past members: Dragan Urošević; Saša Popović; Miša Raca; Laza Ristovski; Dejan Dačović; Nenad Jovanović; Saša Marković; Mikica Zdravković; Dejan Nikolić; Bane Jelić; Dejan Pejović

Osvajači (Serbian Cyrillic: Освајачи; trans. The Conquerors) are a Serbian and Yugoslav hard rock band formed in Kragujevac in 1990.

Formed by vocalist Zvonko Pantović "Čipi", guitarist Dragan Urošević, bass guitarist Saša Popović and drummer Miša Raca, the band was soon joined by veteran keyboardist Laza Ristovski. The band's debut album, Krv i led, was released in 1991 and presented the band with their glam metal sound. Following their second studio release, the 1995 album Sam, recorded with new keyboardist, Nebojša Jakovljević, and new bassist, Dejan Dačović, the band split up in 1997.

In 1998, Pantović and Jakovljević formed the pop rock band Osvajači All Stars with guitarist Bane Jelić, which soon started to be referred to simply as Osvajači. Simultaneously, Urošević reformed Osvajači, featuring Popović on rhythm guitar, vocalist Nenad Jovanović, bass guitarist Saša Marković and drummer Nenad Branković, this incarnation of the band releasing the album Vrelina in 2000. For a period of time, existence of two bands of the same name, both featuring members from the original incarnation of the group, led to confusion of the public. However, most of the fans and the Serbian music press eventually started to consider Urošević-led faction of the band as the continuation of the original Osvajači activity, as it kept in spirit with the band's original hard rock sound, in contrast to Pantović's and Jakovljević's faction, which moved from rock towards pop and pop folk sound.

In 2005, Pantović, Jakovljević and Urošević reunited, the new lineup of Osvajači also featuring Mikica Zdravković (bass guitar) and Dejan Nikolić (drums). After several years of performing with reunited Osvajači, Urošević withdrew from the band, Jakovljević and Pantović continuing as Osvajači with a new lineup of musicians. In 2015, they released the album Sad je na mene red, recorded with Bane Jelić on guitar, but also featuring guest appearance by Urošević on several tracks.

== Band history ==
=== Original incarnation of the band (1990–1997) ===
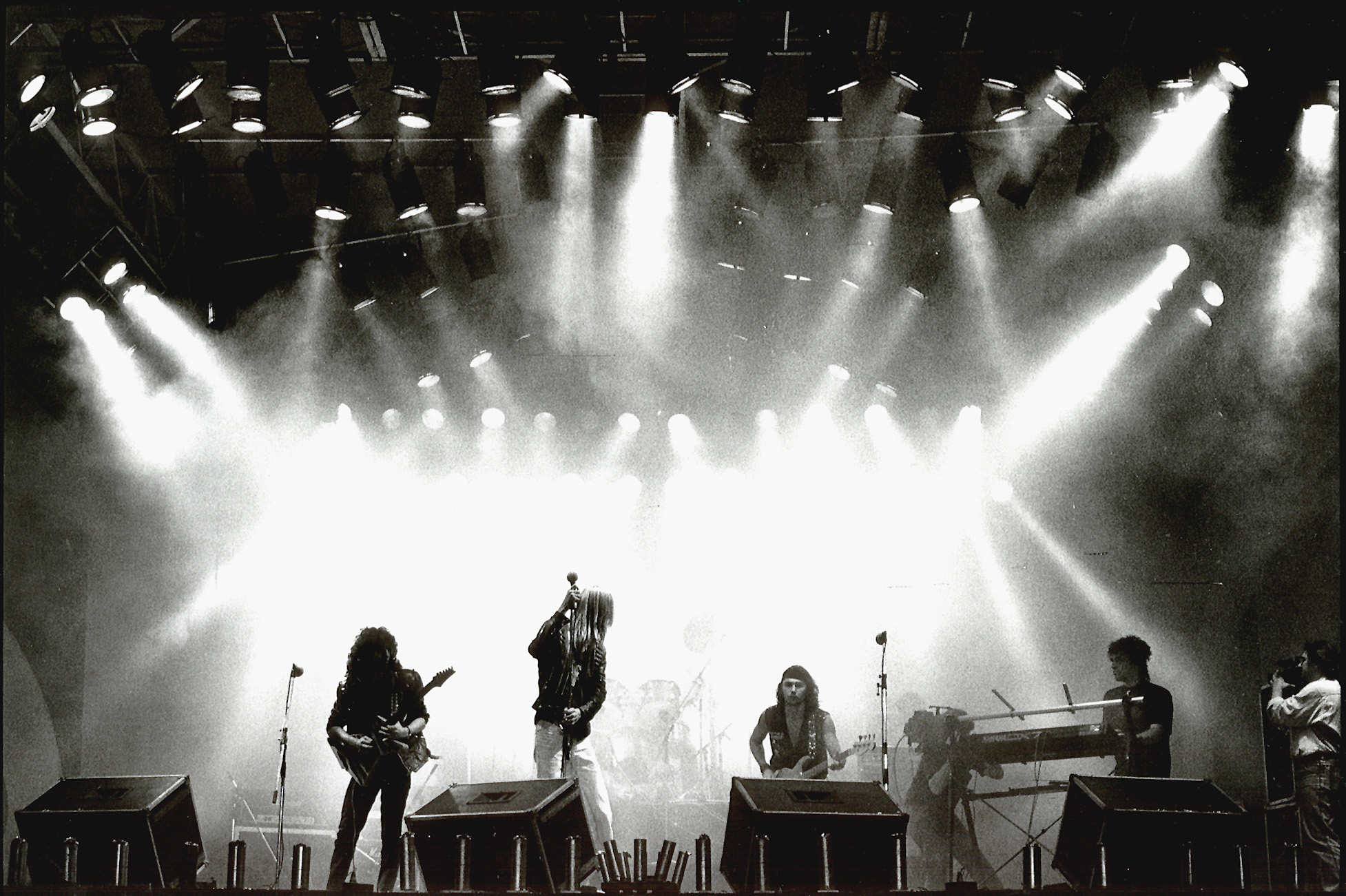
Original Osvajači lineup performing, from left to right: Dragan Urošević, Zvonko Pantović, Saša Popović, Laza Ristovski

The band's beginnings can be tracked back to the hard rock band Pontonski Most (Pontoon Bridge), formed in Kragujevac in mid-1980s. Pontonski Most changed their name to Bledi Ruž (Pale Rouge), and in 1988 self-released a split audio cassette with another Kragujevac band, Debela Nensi (Fat Nancy).

In 1990, Bledi Ruž started working under the name Osvajači. The first lineup of the band featured Zvonko Pantović "Čipi" (vocals), Dragan Urošević (guitar), Saša Popović (bass guitar) and Miša Raca (drums), with veteran keyboardist Laza Ristovski–known as a former member of Smak and Bijelo Dugme, as well as for his solo work–soon getting involved in the band's activity and becoming an official member. On their debut album, Krv i led (Blood and Ice), produced by Ristovski and released in 1991 through PGP-RTB record label, the band presented themselves with glam metal sound. The album's biggest hit was the ballad "Možda nebo zna" ("Maybe Heaven Knows"). The band's second album, Sam (Alone), recorded with the new keyboardist Nebojša Jakovljević and the new bass guitarist Dejan Dačović, and released in 1995 through PGP-RTB successor PGP-RTS, was stylistically similar to their debut. It brought the hits "Maska (Sam)" ("Mask (Alone)"), featuring guest appearance by Ristovski, and the ballad "S kim čekaš dan" ("Who Are You Waiting for the Day With"). After releasing the compilation album 1991 – 1995 in 1997, featuring all the songs from both studio albums, the group disbanded.

=== Two incarnations of the band (1997–2002) ===
After the band split up, Pantović joined the band Prvi Čin (Act One), appearing with them on the Sunčane Skale festival in Herceg Novi with pop folk song "Vino crveno" ("Red Wine"). Soon after, Pantović formed the band Osvajači All Stars with Nebojša Jakovljević and guitarist Bane Jelić, the latter formerly of the bands Magično Oko (Magical Eye), Viktorija and Neverne Bebe. In 1999, Osvajači All Stars released the album Vino crveno (Red Wine), the title track being their version of the Prvi Čin song. The album included "Čuvajmo deci proleća" ("Let's Keep Springs for Our Children"), featuring singer Goca Tržan on vocals, a cover of Atomsko Sklonište song "Pakleni vozači" ("Hell Riders"), a cover of Krvna Grupa song "Da te milujem" ("To Caress You") and a new version of Osvajači ballad "S kim čekaš dan". Vino crveno was followed by stylistically similar albums Nevera (Infidelity), released in 2001, and Crno oko (Dark Eye), released in 2002. The members of the band also wrote music for the theatre play Tri boje duge (Three Colors of the Rainbow) performed in Slavija Theatre.

In the meantime, Urošević reformed Osvajači with Saša Popović (who switched from bass to rhythm guitar), Nenad Jovanović (vocals), Saša Marković (bass guitar) and Nenad Branković (drums). In 2000, the band released the album Vrelina (Heat). The album featured Laza Ristovski on keyboards and included, beside new songs, a cover of Rainbow song "Rainbow Eyes", entitled "Tragovi" ("Traces"). However, this incarnation of the band was short-lived, ending their activity almost immediately after the album release.

=== Reunion (2005-present) ===
In 2005, Pantović, Urošević and Jakovljević reunited under the name Osvajači. The lineup also featured bass guitarist Mikica Zdravković (who was simultaneously a member of the punk rock band Čovek Bez Sluha) and the drummer Dejan Nikolić. The lineup performed for several years, playing material from Krv i led and Sam, before Urošević, Zdravković and Nikolić withdrew from the group, Pantović and Jakovljević continuing as Osvajači.

In 2015, the band released the album Sad je na mene red (It's My Turn Now), in the lineup featuring Zvonko Pantović (vocals), Nebojša Jakovljević (keyboards), Bane Jelić (guitar), Dejan Pejović (bass guitar) and Nenad Branković (drums), Dragan Urošević making guest appearance on three tracks. The album included the English language version of the band's old ballad "S kim čekaš dan", entitled "I Would Just Give Up My Life", released as a bonus track. During the same year, they released the remix of "Možda nebo zna" as a single, with the remix of another old song, "Pronađi me" ("Find Me"), as the B-side. In 2019, the band competed at Beovizija 2019 with the song "Voda i plamen" ("Water and Flame"), and, on 21 April, held a tribute concert to the band Smak in Belgrade's Trade Union Hall with Kragujevac Symphony Orchestra, conducted by Vojkan Borisavljević.

In September 2022, Osvajači released the recording of their 20 August 2022 performance at Belgrade Beer Fest, which featured Urošević as guest, on the live album Beer Fest (Live). The album was released through Sky Music Publishing in digital format only. The band celebrated 30 years of activity on 19 October 2022 (two years after the actual 30th anniversary due to COVID-19 pandemic), featuring numerous guests – Piloti vocalist and guitarist Zoran "Kiki" Lesendrić, Divlje Jagode guitarist Sead "Zele" Lipovača, Kerber vocalist Goran Šepa "Gale", and Smak bass guitarist Zoran Milanović.

One of Osvajači forming members, drummer Miša Raca, who had retired from music after the disbandment of the band's original incarnation, died on 3 July 2024.

In May 2025, Osvajači released the single "Više neće biti nas" ("There Will Be No More of Us"), featuring guest appearances by YU Grupa frontman Dragi Jelić and Divlje Jagode guitarist Zele Lipovača.

=== Other projects by the members (Čipi i Industrija, Epilog) ===
In 2008, Pantović, Urošević, Zdravković and Nikolić formed the band Čipi i Industrija (Čipi and Industry), also featuring guitarist Dragoslav Tanasković "Trnda", formerly of the band Istok Iza (East Behind). In 2008, the group released the album Na Balkanu (On the Balkans), produced by Aleksandar Marinković. The title track was a cover of Smak song, Čipi i Industrija version featuring Đorđe David as guest vocalist. In 2014, Urošević formed the band Epilog. The group released the albums Nova Tempore, in 2016, and Obraz (Face), in 2024, the latter recorded with former Osvajači vocalist Nenad Jovanović.

== Legacy ==
Osvajači song "Maska (Sam)" was covered by Serbian progressive/power metal band Alogia on their 2006 live album Priče o vremenu i životu – Live at SKC (Tales of Time and Life – Live at SKC), Dragan Urošević making a guest appearance on the song. Osvajači song "Ćutiš kao pre" ("You're Silent as Before") was covered by Serbian hard rock band Prljavi Romeo (Dirty Romeo) in 2026.

In 2011, "Maska (Sam)" was polled, by the listeners of Radio 202, one of 60 greatest songs released by PGP-RTB/PGP-RTS during the sixty years of the label's existence.

== Discography ==
=== Studio albums ===
- Krv i led (1991)
- Sam (1995)
- Vrelina (2000)
- Sad je na mene red (2015)

=== Live albums ===
- Beer Fest (Live)

=== Compilations ===
- 1991 – 1995 (1997)

=== Singles ===
- "Samo ti" / "Minut ćutanja" (1999)
- "Možda nebo zna – Remix" / "Pronađi me – Remix" (2019)
