= Atomsko Sklonište =

Croatian and Yugoslav hard rock band

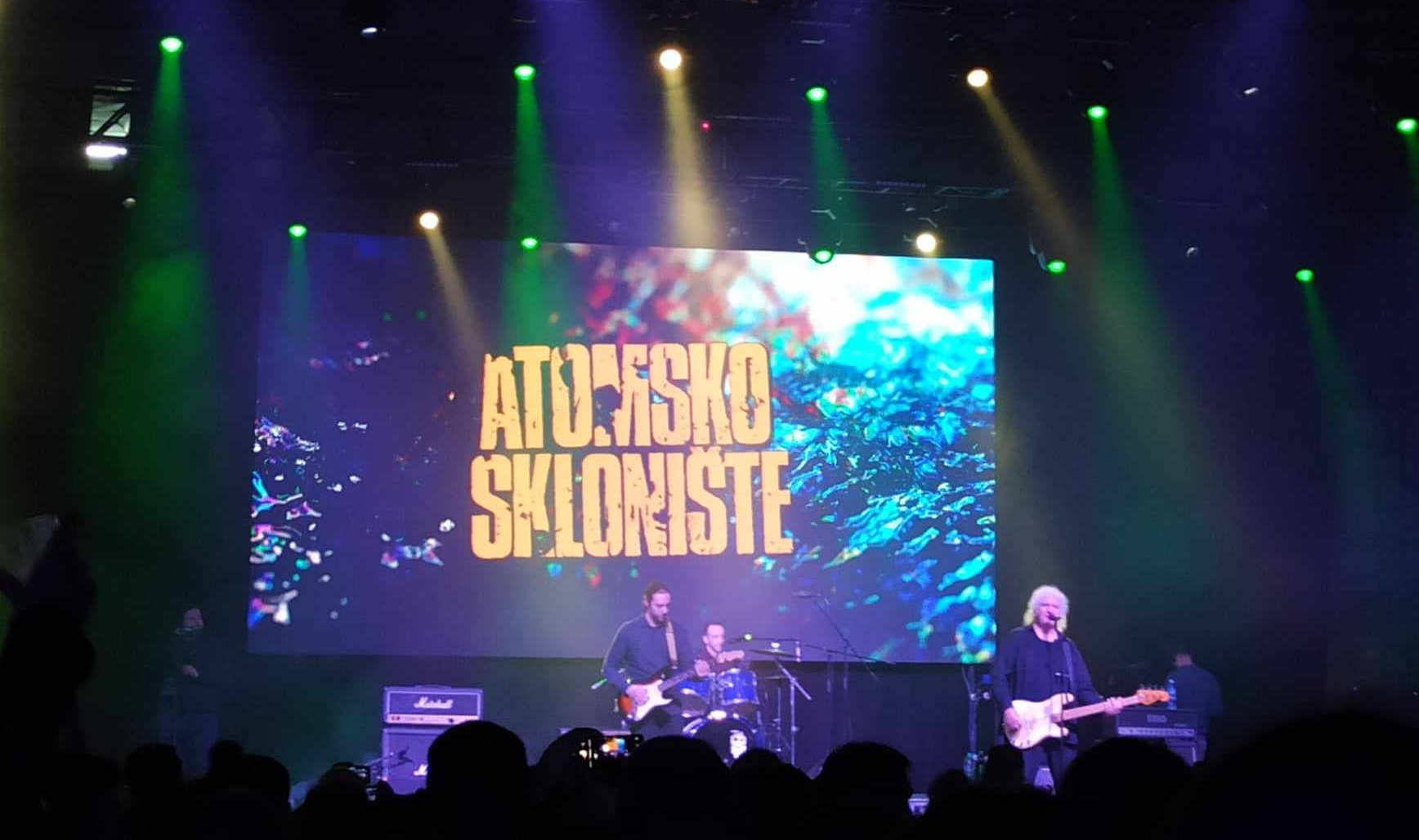
- Atomsko Sklonište performing live in Belgrade in 2022, from left to right: Matija Dadić, Erik Vojak, Bruno Langer

Background information
- Also known as: Atomic Shelter
- Origin: Pula, Croatia
- Genres: Hard rock
- Years active: 1977–present
- Labels: ZKP RTLJ, East Europe Records, PGP-RTB, Croatia Records, One Records, City Records, Fidbox
- Members: Bruno Langer; Matija Dadić; Erik Vojak
- Past members: Sergio Blažić; Dragan Gužvan; Eduard Kancelar; Saša Dadić; Rudolf Grum; Paul Bilandžić; Zdravko Širola; Nikola Duraković; Ranko Svorcan; Stjepan Bobić; Aleks Černjul

Atomsko Sklonište (transl. Fallout Shelter) is a Croatian and Yugoslav hard rock band, formed in Pula in 1977. Known for their early anti-war concept, as well as their later hit songs, Atomsko Sklonište were one of the most prominent acts of the Yugoslav rock scene.

The formation of the band was initiated by Boško Obradović, a poet who wanted a musical band to perform his cataclysmically imagined anti-war verses as lyrics to hard rock songs. The fusion gained the band immediate attention of the Yugoslav public and media. Their first two studio albums, Ne cvikaj generacijo and Infarkt, both released in 1978, brought them nationwide popularity, although Obradović's lyrics were often described by Yugoslav music critics as unrefined. The group ended their cooperation with Obradović after the release of their fourth studio album Extrauterina, released in 1981, with the group's bass guitarist Bruno Langer taking over the role of the band's leader and principal songwriter. Simultaneously with their career in Yugoslavia, the band recorded the English language studio album Space Generation in their attempts to break into foreign market under the name Atomic Shelter. After the death of the band's original vocalist Sergio Blažić in 1987, Langer and the guitarist Dragan Gužvan recorded the band's second English language album, entitled This Spaceship, with a group of American musicians. After Gužvan's departure, Langer remained the only original member of the group, and would be the band's only mainstay member in the following years. After the release of the band's latest studio album Terra Mystica in 1995, Atomsko Sklonište devoted themselves to live performances, releasing several live albums since. Although they do not enjoy large mainstream popularity as in the late 1970s and the first half of the 1980s, the group maintains a loyal fan base in Croatia and other former Yugoslav republics.

== History ==
=== The beginnings (1968–1977) ===
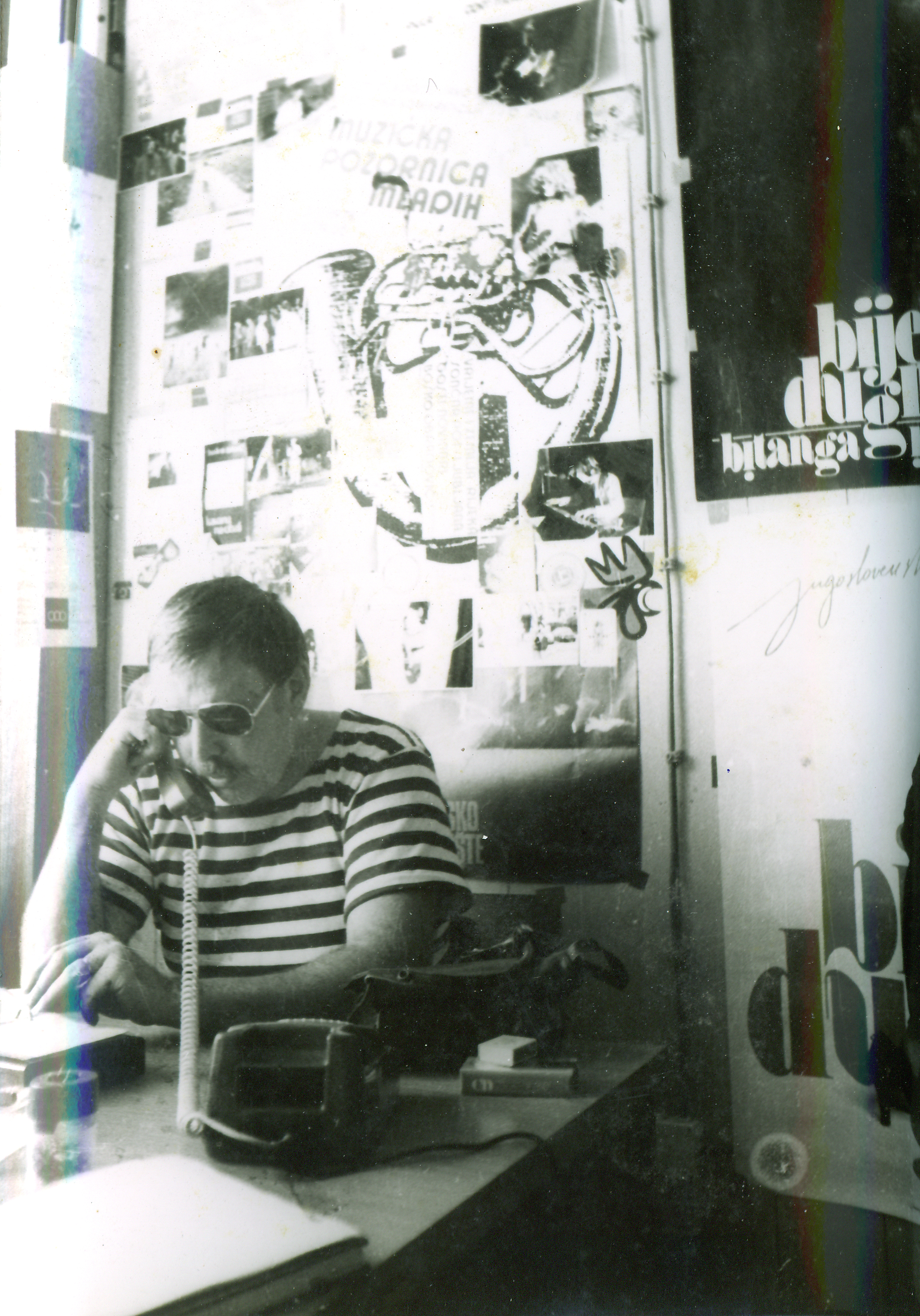
Poet Boško Obradović (shown here in 1983) initiated the 1977 formation of Atomsko Sklonište, creating the band's cataclysmic imagery and writing their lyrics until parting ways with them in 1981.

The band's prehistory can be tracked to 1968, when a play entitled Atomsko sklonište premiered in Istrian National Theater in Pula. The play was directed by poet Boško Obradović and featured a selection of anti-war poetry from across the world, including two of Obradović's poems: "Kuga u Danangu" ("Plague in Danang"), directed against Vietnam War, and "Vaclavske namjesti" ("Wenceslas Square"), against Warsaw Pact invasion of Czechoslovakia. During the following years, Obradović developed an idea of a rock band performing songs with his lyrics. In 1977, in front of the kafana Jadran in Pula, which was a gathering place for local musicians, he offered his lyrics to experienced local musicians and soon reached an agreement with a group of them.

The first lineup of the band featured Sergio Blažić "Đoser" (vocals), Dragan Gužvan (guitar), Bruno Langer (bass guitar), Eduard Kancelar (keyboards), Saša Dadić (drums), and Rudolf Grum (backing vocals). As a teenager, Langer competed as a middleweight boxer, before deciding to dedicate himself to music and becoming the bass guitarist for the Pula band Beat Stones in 1964. After Beat Stones, he performed in the bands Fantomi (The Phantoms) and Logaritmi (The Logarithms). At the beginning of the 1970s, Langer, Blažić (at the time playing the drums), Gužvan, Dadić and vocalist Branko Umković formed the cover band Hush. In 1974, Langer moved to the Koper-based band Boomerang, where he was soon joined by Blažić, the two performing with the group until the autumn of 1976.

=== Sergio Blažić years (1977–1986) ===
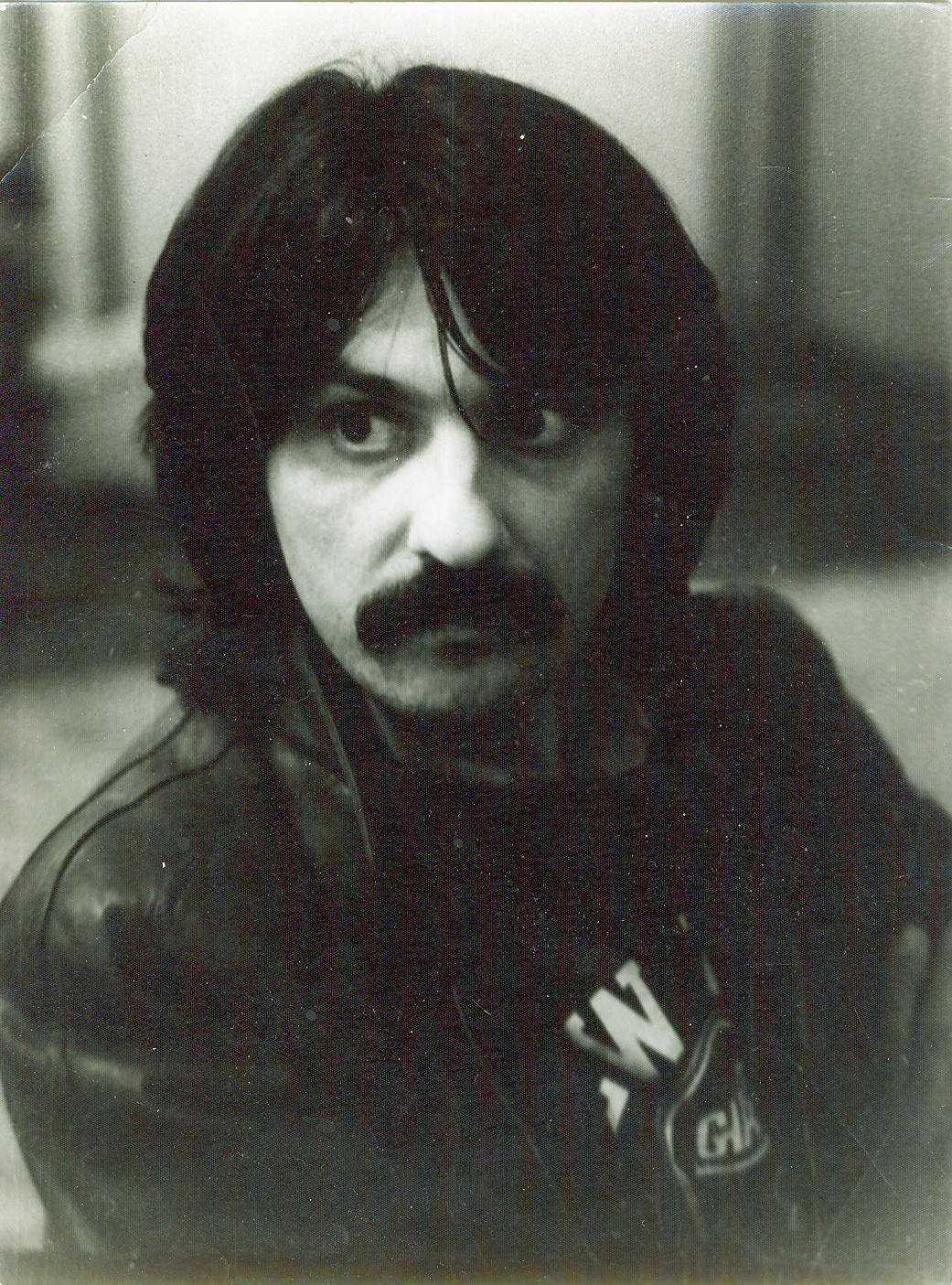
Sergio Blažić (shown here in 1981) was Atomsko Sklonište's vocalist from the band's formation in 1977 until his death in 1987.

Atomsko Sklonište was officially formed on 26 February 1977. The band attracted the attention of the public with their performance at the seventh edition of BOOM Festival, held in December 1977 in Novi Sad. On 11 May 1978, they performed, alongside Galija, Generacija 5, Rani Mraz, Laboratorija Zvuka, Igra Staklenih Perli, Tako and other acts, at Youth Festival held at Subotica Sports Hall, presenting songs to be released on their first studio album.

The band's debut album, entitled Ne cvikaj generacijo (Don't Be Afraid, My Generation), was released in 1978 through ZKP RTLJ record label. It featured hard rock sound combined with Obradović's anti-war and cataclysmic lyrics, heavily inspired by hippie movement, which would lead part of Yugoslav music critics to describe the band's image and song themes as outdated. The opening track was Obradović's recitation of his poem "Od rata do rata" ("From War to War"). The album brought the hits "Pomorac sam, majko" ("I'm a Mariner, Mother"), "Kinematograf našeg detinjstva" ("Cinematograph of Our Childhood"), "Ne cvikaj, generacijo" and "Saznao sam dijagnozu" ("They Told Me the Diagnosis"), the latter featuring lyrics written by Blažić. The band gained additional attention of the public by stating that they perform punk (although they later admitted that at that point they had no idea what punk sounds like), with torn clothes and effective photographs made by photographer Tone Stojko from Maribor. The band would later record the song "Zaspao si u mojoj kosi" ("You Fell Asleep in My Hair") with Stojko's wife Neca Falk. Ne cvikaj generacijo was the band's only album recorded with dwarfism-suffering backing vocalist Rudolf Grum. After the recording of the album, he got a job in the Uljanik shipbuilding company and retired from performing.

The band's second album, entitled Infarkt (Heart Attack), was released during the same year. The release featured a book of photographs by Stojko. It brought new hits for the band, "Pakleni vozači" ("Hell Riders"), "Bez kaputa" ("Without a Coat") and "Djevojka br. 8" ("The Girl No.8"). As the band's previous album, Infarkt also featured Obradović's recitation as the opening track, "Na proplanku čeka cvijet" ("A Flower Is Waiting in the Clearing"). The song "Oni što dolaze za nama" ("The Ones Coming after Us") received attention in the following decades for its visionary lyrics, especially the verse "Sklapaće se prijateljstva putem kućnog kompjutera" ("Friendships will be made via personal computer"). After the album release, Kancelar left the band in order to dedicate himself to his studies, and was replaced by Paul Bilandžić.

The band maintained their popularity with their live appearances, which featured unusual scenery, such as barbed wire, and during a concert in Tivoli Hall in Ljubljana three hundred yellow umbrellas were hanged open above the stage, in reference to the band's song "Žuti kišobran" ("Yellow Umbrella"). The band gained a loyal fanbase, although Obradović's lyrics were often criticized in the Yugoslav music press as unconvincing and unrefined. The band recorded their third album U vremenu horoskopa (In the Time of Horoscope) on the Stoja peninsula near Pula, in the Mobile One mobile studio, previously used by AC/DC. The album was produced by John Etchells and Bill Ainsworth and brought the hits "Gazi opet čizma" ("The Boot Is Stamping Again") and "Čedna gradska lica" ("Innocent City Faces"). After the album release, Bilandžić left the band and formed the group Lilihip (Lollipop)—in the following years he would release four albums with the band, Obavezan smjer (Mandatory Direction, 1980), Lutke sad su skupe (The Dolls Are Expensive Nowadays, 1984), Lilihip (1985) and Ja sam dečko naviknut na bol (I'm a Boy Accustomed to Pain, 1996)—and Atomsko Sklonište continued as a quartet. In 1980, the band recorded their first live album Atomska trilogija (Nuclear Trilogy) on a concert held in the garden of the Yugoslav People's Army Hall in Pula. On 31 December 1980 and 1 January 1981 they held two concerts with Riblja Čorba (Fish Stew) in Belgrade's Pionir Hall, the concerts being advertised as Atomska Čorba (Atomic Stew). In 1981 they were, alongside Iron Maiden, Bijelo Dugme and Divlje Jagode, the headliners of the two-day festival Svi marš na ples! (Everybody Dance Now!) held in 1981 at Belgrade Hippodrome.

The band released their fourth studio album Extrauterina (Ectopic Pregnancy) in 1981. The album was recorded with Etchells and Ainsworth as the producers in the Super Bear Studio, located in a monastery in the French Alps, and previously used by Elton John, Kate Bush and Pink Floyd. The album presented the band's new drummer Zdravko Širola, who also played keyboards on the album recording. Its biggest hit was "Olujni mornar" ("Storm Sailor"), and the song "Smanji gas" ("Reduce the Speed") attracted attention with its use of accordion. After the release of Extrauterina, the band ended their cooperation with Boško Obradović. In the following years, he would publish the book of poems Postajem sam sebi drug (I'm Becoming My Own Friend, 1983) and a children's book created with illustrator Miroslav Šuput and entitled Kad se more u srce sakrije, kad brodovi u srce uplove (When the Sea Hides Itself in a Heart, When the Ships Sail into the Heart, 1984). He died on 27 July 1997, and the book of his poems entitled Godine nježnosti (Years of Tenderness) was published posthumously in 1998.

With the end of cooperation with Obradović, Langer took over the role of the band's leader and the songwriter. In 1982, the band released the album Mentalna higijena (Mental Hygiene), recorded at the JAM Studio in London. The album brought the hits "Treba imat dušu" ("One Must Have a Soul") and "Žuti kišobran" ("Yellow Umbrella"). The track "Mutna rijeka" ("Muddy River") featured guest appearance by British saxophone player Mel Collins. During the same year, the band went to Florida, where they recorded the album Space Generation for the foreign market. The album featured nine old Atomsko Sklonište songs re-recorded with English language lyrics written by Dražen Met Premet. The band released the album through East Europe Records under the Atomic Shelter moniker, and in Yugoslavia the album was released through PGP-RTB.

In 1984, the band released the album Zabranjeno snivanje (Dreaming Forbidden). Recorded at the Trooly Sound studio in Zagreb, the album brought the hit "Ljubomora" ("Jealousy"). The live album Jednom u životu (Once in a Lifetime), recorded on the concert held at Belgrade's Tašmajdan Stadium on 15 September 1984 and released in 1985, was the last Atomsko Sklonište album to feature Blažić on vocals. In 1985, Blažić took part in the YU Rock Misija project, a Yugoslav contribution to Live Aid, contributing vocals to the song "Za milion godina". In addition, Atomsko Sklonište performed at the corresponding charity concert held at the Red Star Stadium in Belgrade. On 21 July 1986, the band had their last performance with Blažić in the Pula club Uljanik. He died on 18 January 1987, after more than 15 years of fighting lymph cancer. In honor of Blažić, the Đoser Memorial Days were initiated in Pula in 1988. They consisted of concerts and futsal tournaments, with all the funds raised dedicated to people fighting cancer.

=== Fronted by Bruno Langer (1987–present) ===
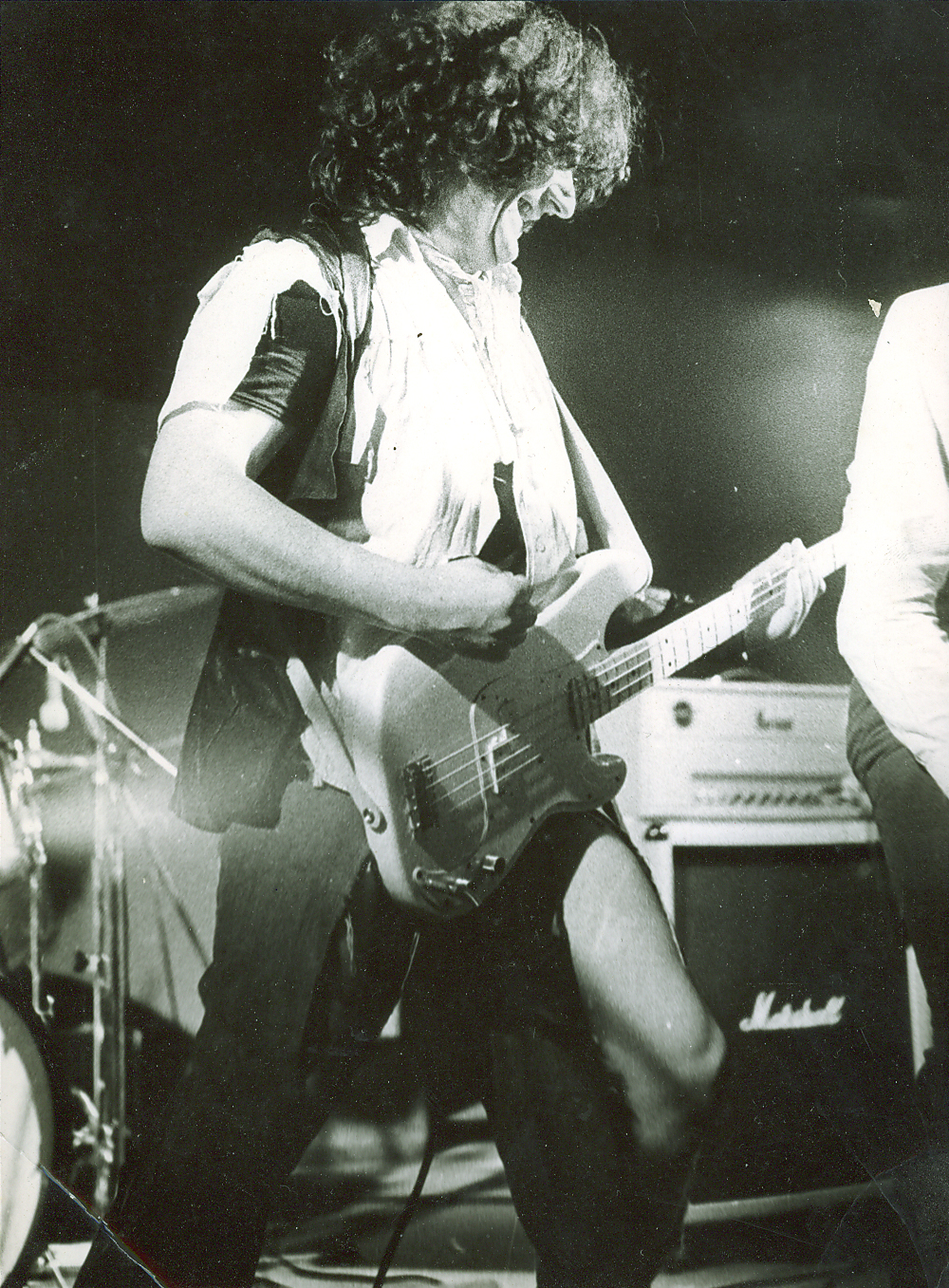
Bass guitarist Bruno Langer performing with Atomsko Sklonište in 1981. Langer has been the only mainstay member of the band since its formation in 1977. After the band ended their cooperation with Boško Obradović, he took over the role of the band's leader and songwriter, and after Serđo Blažić's death in 1987, he also took over the vocal duties

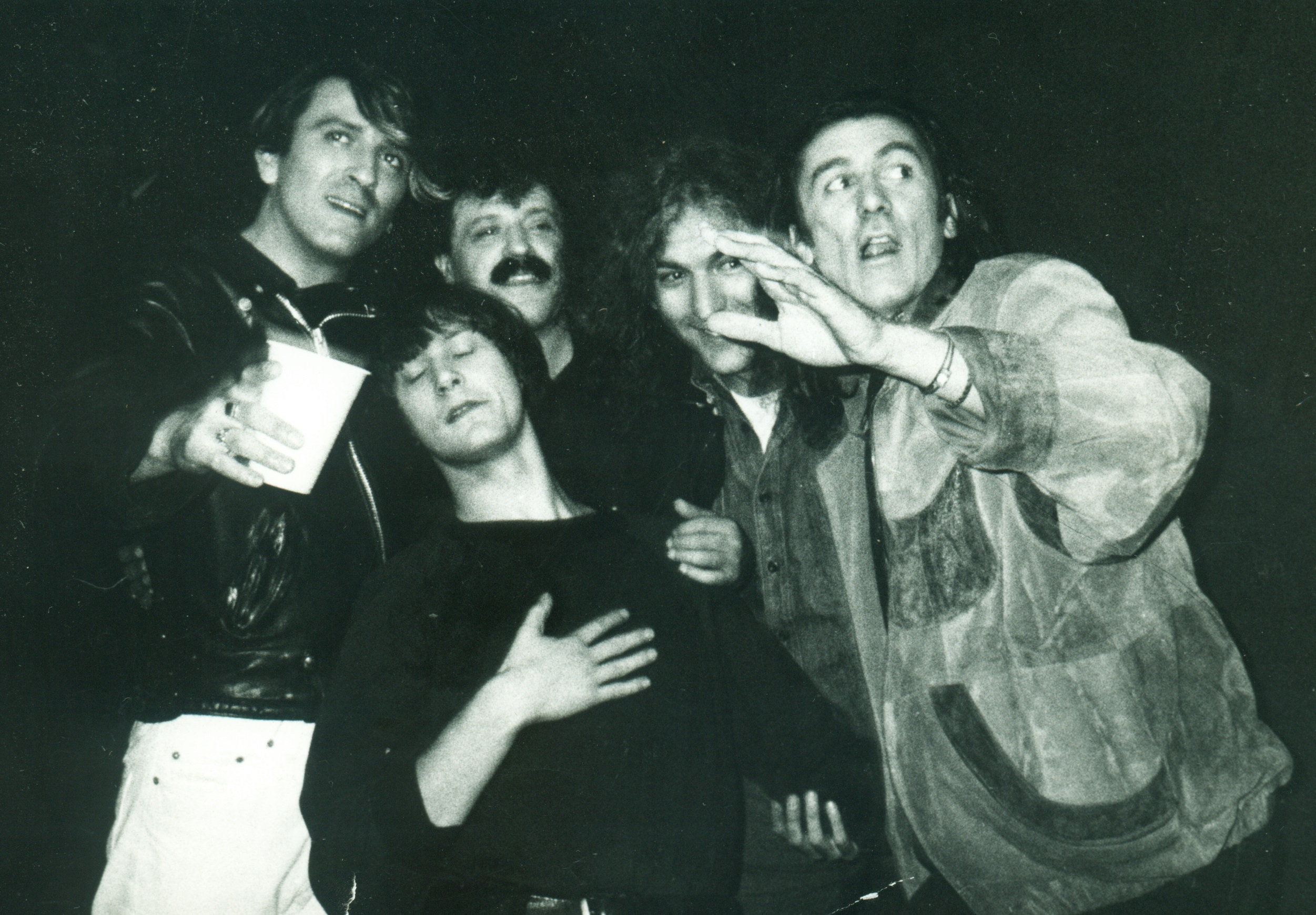
Mladen Vojičić Tifa, Davor Gobac (of Psihomodo Pop), concert organizer Želimir Altarac "Čičak", Bruno Langer, and Branko Đurić "Đuro" (of Bombaj Štampa) during the 1989 YU Rock Marathon festival held in Sarajevo's Zetra Hall

In 1987, Langer and Gužvan recorded the band's second English language album for the foreign market, entitled This Spaceship, with American musicians Wes Talton (vocals), Freddie Stuckey (keyboards) and David Pressley (drums). The album was recorded in Florida and released under the Atomic Shelter moniker. The album featured six old re-recorded songs and four new ones. At the end of the year, Langer and Gužvan parted, Langer forming a new lineup of the band, featuring himself on bass guitar and vocals, Ranko Svorcan on guitar and Nikola Duraković on drums, and the group was occasionally joined on their live appearances by guitarist Aleks Černjul. After leaving the band, Gužvan dedicated himself to his job as the director of the Narodne novine sales department and to producing guitar amplifiers.

In 1990, the band's new lineup released the album Criminal Tango. It featured the song "Tajna" ("The Secret") dedicated to Blažić and guest appearances by the band's former member Paul Bilandžić and saxophonist Berislav Jurišić. On 31 August 1991, at the time when military conflicts in Yugoslavia had already begun, Atomsko Sklonište performed on the concert entitled Koncert za mir (Concert for Piece) held in Šumarice Memorial Park in Kragujevac, Serbia, and on the evening of the same day, they performed on Gitarijada festival in Zaječar.

In 1992, the band released their third English language album, entitled East Europe Man, featuring Wes Talton on vocals. The song "Chinese Bike" from the album entered the Billboard Hot 100 chart, and four songs from the album appeared on the various artists compilation Best of East Europe Rock SpinUp. In 1995, the band released their latest studio album Terra Mistica. In 1999, Nikola Duraković was replaced by Stjepan Bobić, formerly of the bands Nola, The Spoons, and Messerschmitt. After his departure from Atomsko Sklonište, Duraković played with Double Dose Blues Band. He died on 17 October 2021.

In 2001, the band marked 10th anniversary of their performance at the 1991 Gitarijada festival by appearing at the festival once more, and for this occasion, Langer travelled to Zaječar by driving his Mercedes-Benz which was once part of Josip Broz Tito's vehicle fleet at Brijuni. The band performed as the opening band for Whitesnake on their concert in Pula, and for Motörhead on their concert in Rijeka. In 2003, One Records released the DVD entitled Atomsko Sklonište, featuring a collection of their music videos and a recording of their performance at the 1991 Gitarijada festival. In 2007, RTV Slovenija released a seven-piece box set Ne cvikaj generacijo, featuring the band's albums originally released for RTV Ljubljana's predecessor ZKP RTLJ.

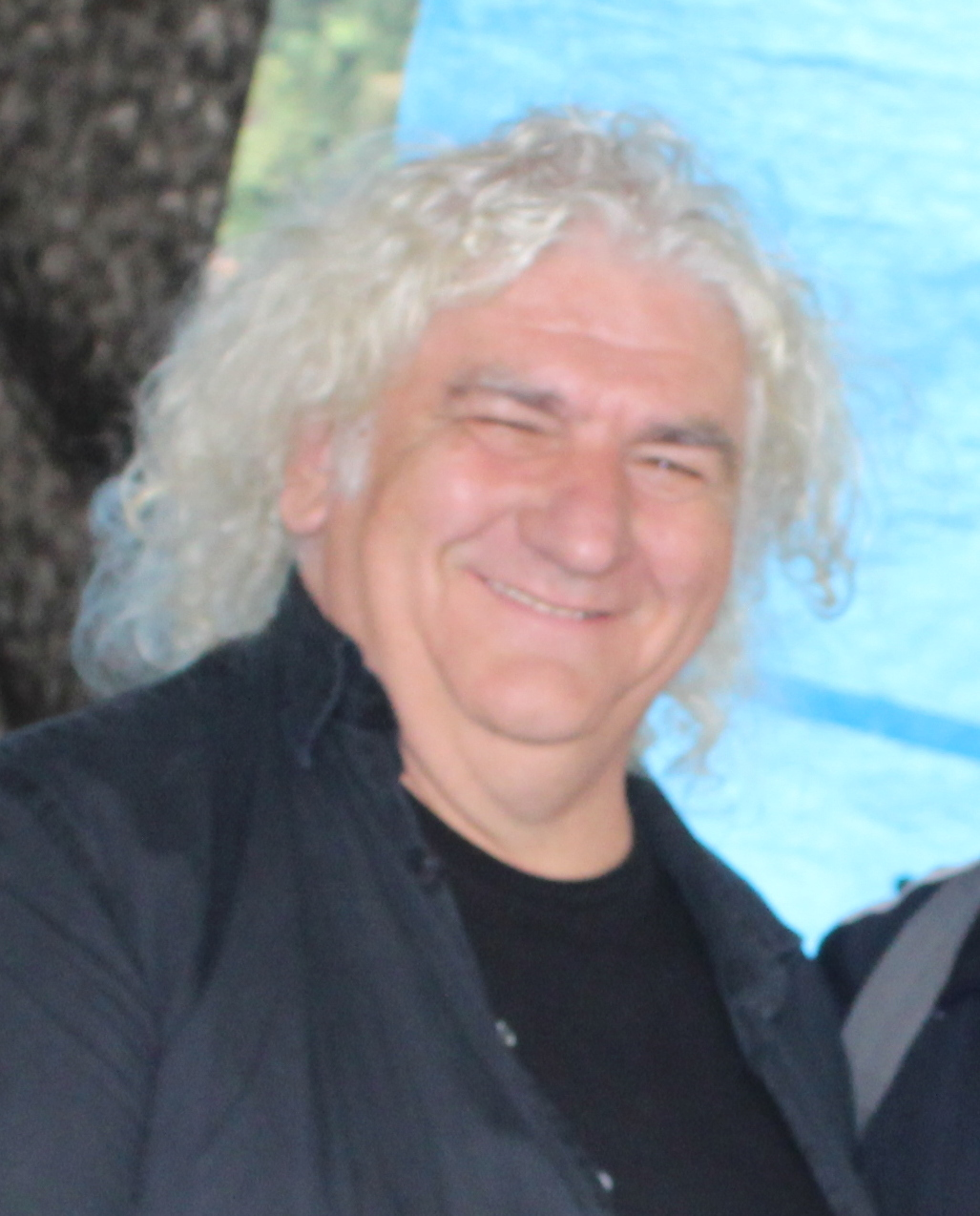
Bruno Langer in 2016

In 2018, Stjepan Bobić and Ranko Svorcan were replaced by drummer Erik Vojak and guitarist Matija Dadić, the latter a grandson of the band's original drummer Saša Dadić. The new lineup released the live album Oni što dolaze za nama, recorded on 18 August 2019 on the band's performance at Belgrade Beer Fest. The band's former drummer Zdravko Širola died on 20 August 2019. The live album Uživo Novi Sad 2022 (Novi Sad Live 2022) was recorded on Atomsko Sklonište concert held at Novi Sad Fair on 5 November 2022, and released on vinyl only. On 22 November 2023, the band held a concert in Belgrade's Trade Union Hall in honor of Blažić. The concert featured numerous guests: Žika and Dragi Jelić of YU Grupa, Bora Đorđević of Riblja Čorba, Jurica Pađen of Aerodrom, Mladen Vojičić "Tifa", Zvonimir Đukić "Đule" of Van Gogh, Zvonko Pantović "Čipi" of Osvajači, Pero Galić of Opća Opasnost and Đorđe David. The recording of the concert was released on the double live album Serđo živi in 2024.

== Legacy ==
In 2014, a green area in Krležina street in Pula was officially named Sergio Blažić "Đoser" Field.

The song "Treba imat dušu" was covered by Serbian and Yugoslav singer Dušan Prelević "Prele" on his 1996 album Ja Prele (I, Prele). The song "Pakleni vozači" was covered by Serbian hard rock band Indijanci on their 1997 album Ne može biti veselije (Couldn't Be Merrier), one incarnation of the Serbian rock band Osvajači on the 1999 album Vino crveno (Red Wine), Serbian alternative rock band Supernaut on their 2006 album Eli, and Croatian hard rock band Opća Opasnost on their 2019 album Karta do prošlosti (Ticket to the Past), the latter version featuring guest appearances by Bruno Langer Ranko Svorcan. The song "Ne cvikaj generacijo" was covered by Serbian rock singer Viktorija on her 2000 album Nostalgija (Nostalgia). The song "Pomorac sam majko" was covered by Croatian singer Marijan Ban on his 2003 album Staro zlato (Old Gold). The song "Rađaju se nova djeca" ("New Children Are Born") was covered by Serbian rock band Krug Dvojke on their 2004 self-titled album. "The song "Čedna gradska lica" was covered by Croatian heavy metal band Keops on their 2016 album Lice sudbine (The Face of Destiny), and by Bosnian guitarist Emir Hot on his 2018 album Beyond Rock. In 2005, film director and guitarist Danilo Šerbedžija formed the band Fiji di Bruno Atomico in Pula, the group performing covers of Atomsko Sklonište songs with Italian language lyrics.

In 1998, the album Ne cvikaj, generacijo was polled as 47th on the list of 100 greatest Yugoslav popular music albums in the book YU 100: najbolji albumi jugoslovenske rok i pop muzike (YU 100: The Best albums of Yugoslav pop and rock music). In 2015, the same album was polled as 99th on the list of 100 Greatest Yugoslav Albums published by the Croatian edition of Rolling Stone. In 1987, in YU legende uživo (YU Legends Live), a special publication by Rock magazine, Jednom u životu was proclaimed one of 12 best Yugoslav live albums.

In 2000, "Treba imat dušu", "Ne cvikaj generacijo" and "Pomorac sam, majko" were polled No.15, No.30 and No.80 respectively on Rock Express Top 100 Yugoslav Rock Songs of All Times list.

== Band members ==
Current members

- Bruno Langer – bass guitar (1977–present), lead vocals (1987–present)
- Matija Dadić – guitar (2018–present)
- Eric Vojak – drums (2018–present)

Former members

- Sergio Blažić – lead vocals (1977–1987; his death)
- Dragan Gužvan – guitar (1977–1987)
- Saša Dadić – drums (1977–1981)
- Eduard Kancelar – keyboards (1977–1978)
- Rudolf Grum – backing vocals (1977–1978)
- Paul Bilandžić – keyboards (1978–1980)
- Zdravko Širola – drums, keyboards (1981–1987; died 2019)
- Ranko Svorcan – guitar (1987–2018)
- Nikola Duraković – drums (1987–1999; died 2021)
- Aleks Černjul – guitar (occasional live appearances only, 1990–2020)
- Stjepan Bobić – drums (1999–2018)

Timeline

== Discography ==
=== Studio albums ===
- Ne cvikaj generacijo (1978)
- Infarkt (1978)
- U vremenu horoskopa (1980)
- Extrauterina (1981)
- Mentalna higijena (1982)
- Space Generation (as Atomic Shelter, 1983)
- Zabranjeno snivanje (1984)
- This Spaceship (as Atomic Shelter, 1987)
- Criminal Tango (1990)
- East Europe Man (as Atomic Shelter, 1992)
- Terra Mistica (1995)

=== Live albums ===
- Atomska trilogija (1980)
- Jednom u životu (1985)
- Oni što dolaze za nama (2020)
- Uživo Novi Sad 2022 (2023)
- Serđo živi (2024)

=== Compilations ===
- 1976 – 1986 (1996)
- '76 - '86 Kolekcija hitova Vol.2
- Atomsko Sklonište (2007)

=== Video albums ===
- Atomsko sklonište (2003)

=== Singles ===
- "Pomorac sam majko" / "Pakleni vozači" (1979)
- "Bez kaputa" / "Tko će sad na zgarištu reći" (1980)
- "Generacija sretnika" / "Gazi opet čizma" (1980)
- "Night Launch" / "State of Mind" (1983)
