= Neverne Bebe =

Serbian rock band

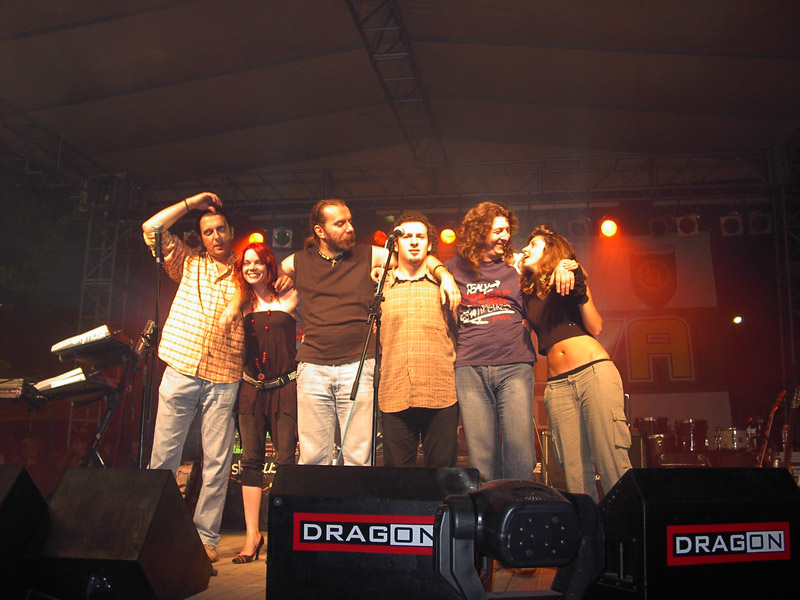
- Neverne Bebe in 2007, from left to right: Vladan Đurđević, Jana Šušteršič, Milan Đurđević, Vladimir Ružičić, Saša Ranđelović, and Jelena Pudar.

Background information
- Origin: Belgrade, Serbia
- Genres: Arena rock; jazz fusion; rock; pop rock
- Years active: 1993–present
- Labels: Take It Or Leave It Records, Red Line Records, Hi-Fi Centar, BK Sound, PGP-RTS, City Records
- Members: Jelena Pudar; Tijana Sretković; Milan Đurđević; Vladan Đurđević; Saša Ranđelović; Vladimir Ružičić; Nemanja Savić
- Past members: Bane Jelić; Čeda Macura; Billy King; Dušan Šubarević; Gorica Ponjavić; Aleksandar Tasić; Goran Marinković; Duca Ivanišević; Jana Šušteršič; Andreja Stojić
- Website: www.neverne-bebe.com

Neverne Bebe (Serbian Cyrillic: Неверне Бебе, lit. 'The Unfaithful Babies') are a Serbian rock band, originally formed in Valjevo in 1993 and currently based in Belgrade. Initially, the band performed jazz-influenced arena rock, then turned towards more artistic rock, and in the mid-2000s turned towards a more commercial pop rock sound, becoming one of the most popular acts of the Serbian rock scene during the 2000s and 2010s.

== History ==
=== 1990s ===
The band was formed in 1993 by a former Nova Zemlja, Smak and Frenki keyboardist Milan Đurđević. The first lineup featured Vladan Đurđević (bass guitar), Bane Jelić (a former Viktorija backing band member, guitar), Čeda Macura (drums) and Puniša Zeljković, also known as Billy King (vocals). The band had its first performance on April 4, 1993, in Belgrade. The band's debut, progressive rock-oriented album Neverne Bebe I was released in 1994. It featured the hits "Veliki je Bog" ("Lord is Great") and "1000 godina" ("1000 Years"). Neverne Bebe I also featured a cover of the song "Daire" ("Tambourine"), originally released by Milan Đurđević's former band Smak. The Neverne Bebe version featured a guest appearance by Smak guitarist Radomir Mihajlović Točak.

After the release of the first album, Macura and Jelić left the band. The guitarist Saša Ranđelović (a former Čutura i Oblaci member), drummer Dušan Šubarević and female vocalist Gorica Ponjavić became the band's new members. This lineup held its first concert in Podgorica on May 25, 1994. At the end of 1996, Billy King left the band, and was replaced by Aleksandar Tasić, and in August 1997 Šubarević left the band and was replaced by Goran Marinković. In 1997, the band released their second studio album, Neverne Bebe II, featuring hits "Godine srama" ("Years of Shame"), "Divlje svinje" ("Wild Boars"), "Stranac" ("Fereigner") and the band's cult ballad "Dvoje" ("Couple").

=== 2000s ===
In 2001, the band released the album Neverne Bebe III – Južno od sreće (Unfaithful Babies III – South of Happiness), which was more mainstream-oriented than the band's previous releases. The album featured hits "Ljubav" ("Love"), "Balkan" and "Gotovo" ("Over"). The album also featured a live version of the band's old hit "Divlje svinje".

In 2003, vocalists Ponjavić, Tasić and Marinković left the band, and two female singers, Jelena Pudar and Jana Šušteršič, and the drummer Duca Ivanišević joined the band. This lineup held its first concert in Herceg-Novi. In 2004, the band released the album Neverne Bebe IV – Dvoje – The Best Of (Unfaithful Babies IV – Couple – Best Of). The album featured re-recorded hits as well as two new songs and marked the band's shift towards pop rock.

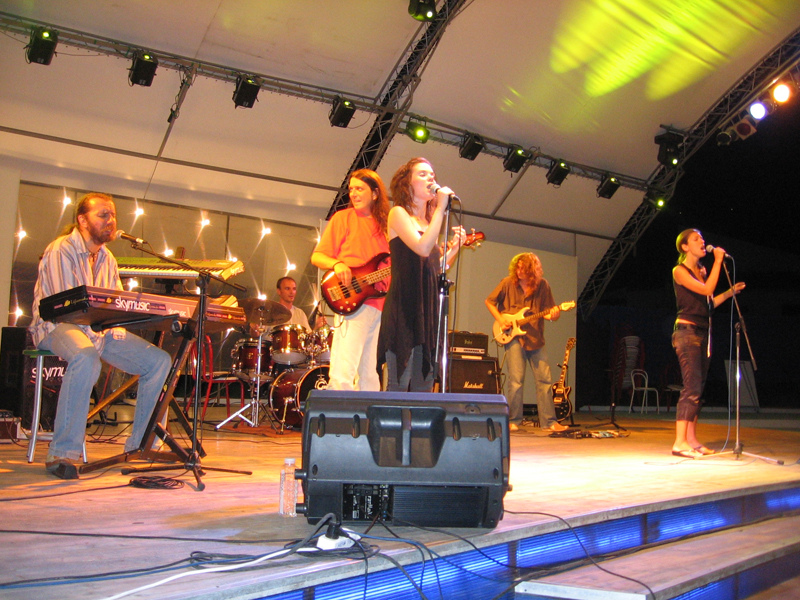
Neverne Bebe performing in Budva in 2005

In 2005, Ivanišević was replaced by Vladimir Ružičić. In 2006, the band performed as the opening band on Toto concert in Belgrade's Tašmajdan Stadium, and during the following year released their fifth album. ...Iza oblaka (...Beyond the Clouds). The album featured the ballad "Boje duge" ("Colors of the Rainbow") recorded with Parni Valjak frontman Aki Rahimovski. In 2008, the band performed as an opening act on Lenny Kravitz concert in Belgrade Arena.

=== 2010s ===
In 2010, the band released the single "Uzmi boje" ("Take the Colors"), announcing their sixth studio album. However, in March 2011, Jana Šušteršič left the band, moving to USA. She was replaced by Tijana Sretković, who previously performed with the band on several occasions.

In 2012, the band released their sixth studio album, entitled Praštam (I Forgive). Beside Sretković, Praštam featured another new member, Andreja Stojić (acoustic guitar). The album, released in standard and deluxe edition, featured guest appearances by Croatian singer Vanna, on the track "Za tvoje oči" ("For Your Eyes"), and Macedonian guitarist Vlatko Stefanovski, on the track "Dan tvoj" ("Your Day"). Only several months after the album release, Stojić was replaced by Nemanja Savić, singer of the hard rock band Atlantida. Alongside acoustic guitar, in Neverne Bebe Savić also plays percussion instruments and sings backing vocals. In 2013, the band rerecorded the song "Ovo je kraj" ("This Is the End"), originally released on Praštam, with the members of Crvena Jabuka. The new version was released on Crvena Jabuka album Nek' bude ljubav (Let There Be Love). On December 28, 2013, the band celebrated 20 years of activity with a concert in Kombank Arena. In 2014, the band recorded the song "Rekvijem" ("Requiem") for the Kruševac People's Theatre's production of Martin McDonagh's The Beauty Queen of Leenane, releasing it as a single.

In 2017, the band released their seventh album, entitled Priča o nama (The Story of Us). The album was previously announced by the singles "Kad te probude" ("When They Wake You Up"), released in December 2014, "Tu kraj nas" ("Here by Us"), released in June 2015, and "Priča o nama", released in February 2016. The album featured a duet with Macedonian singer Daniel Kajmakoski entitled "Još se nadam" ("I Still Have Hope"), as well as a new version of the band's old song "Tužna pesma" ("Sad Song"). The album was released in standard and in limited edition.

The band celebrated their 25th anniversary with a series of concerts, starting with a concert in Serbian National Theatre in Novi Sad, held on November 10, 2018. In December 2018, the band released the song "Suze sa zvezda padaju" ("The Tears Are Falling from the Stars"), composed on the lyrics of Nenad Radulović, the frontman of the band Poslednja Igra Leptira. The lyrics were written by Radulović shortly before his death in 1990, being the last lyrics he wrote. Neverne Bebe composed music on the lyrics after the wish of Radulović's family members. In June 2019, the band performed in Moscow's Gorky Park, on the Art-Football art and music festival, and, alongside YU Grupa, Van Gogh, Neno Belan, Artan Lili, Zemlja Gruva and Dejan Cukić, in Štark Arena in Belgrade on the Radio 202 50th anniversary celebration concert.

In January 2020, Neverne Bebe released the single "Zajedno" ("Together"), recorded with Croatian musician Neno Belan, announcing their eight studio album. In March 2020, the band released the second single from the upcoming album, "Vodi me odavde" ("Take Me out of Here"), inspired by the COVID-19 pandemic.

== Legacy ==
In 2011, the song "Da ima nas" ("There Should Be Us") from the album ...Iza oblaka was polled, by the listeners of Radio 202, one of 60 greatest songs released by PGP-RTB/PGP-RTS during the sixty years of the label's existence.

== Discography ==
=== Studio albums ===
- Neverne Bebe I (1994)
- Neverne Bebe II (1997)
- Neverne bebe III – Južno od sreće (2001)
- Neverne Bebe IV – Dvoje – The Best Of (2004)
- ...Iza oblaka (2007)
- Praštam (2012)
- Priča o nama (2017)

== Awards ==
- 2001: Best Rock Album (Neverne bebe III – Južno od sreće) at Herceg Novi Music Festival
- 2004: Song of the Decade ("Dvoje") at Radijski festival
- 2004: Best Rock Album (Dvoje – Best Of) at Herceg Novi Music Festival
- 2005: Great Contribution to Rock 'n' Roll at Beovizija
- 2006: Best Rock Band at Beovizija
- 2007: Single of the Year ("Da ima nas") at Beovizija
- 2007: Band of the Year at Radijski festival
- 2008: Pop Band of the Year at Beovizija
