= Poslednja Igra Leptira =

Yugoslav pop rock band

- Poslednja Igra Leptira in 1986

Background information
- Origin: Belgrade, SR Serbia, Yugoslavia
- Genres: Country (early); rock; pop rock; comedy rock
- Years active: 1979–1989
- Labels: ZKP RTLJ, PGP-RTB, ITMM
- Past members: Nenad Radulović; Zorica Đermanov; Draško Janković; Sašo Bogojevski; Dragan Todorović; Olivera Perić; Dušan Hristić; Slobodan Mitić; Lidija Asanović; Dragomir Stanojević; Dragoljub Pejoski

Poslednja Igra Leptira (Serbian Cyrillic: Последња Игра Лептира; trans. Last Dance of a Butterfly) was a Yugoslav pop rock band formed in Belgrade in 1979.

Fronted by charismatic vocalist Nenad "Neša" Radulović, Poslednja Igra Leptira gained the attention of the Yugoslav media and public in the early 1980s with their cabaretic performances, which combined commercial pop rock with parody and humorous sketches. The band's debut album, released in 1982, saw large commercial success. By the end of the decade, the band had released four more studio albums, scoring a number of hits. The group disbanded in 1989, Radulović starting a short-lasting solo career, before dying of cancer in 1990.

== History ==
=== 1979-1989 ===
The band was formed in Belgrade in 1979. Initially, they performed as an acoustic country band, holding frequent concerts in Belgrade Youth Center's Jazz Club, Technical Engineering Students' Club, Student's Cultural Center and Dadov theatre. Simultaneously, the band's frontman Nenad "Neša" Radulović cooperated with Radio Belgrade comedy show Indexovo radio pozorište. Radulović was the band's principal songwriter, with the group also working with Radio Belgrade journalist and lyricist Dragomir Bulić.

After winning the Palilulska Olimpijada Kulture (Palilula Culture Olympics) contest in 1981, the band gained larger media attention and a steady lineup, consisting of Nenad Radulović (vocals), Zorica Đermanov (vocals), Draško Janković (guitar), Sašo Bogojevski (bass guitar), Dragan Todorović (drums), Olivera Perić (violin) and Dušan Hristić (banjo, keyboards). Their debut album Napokon ploča (At Last, a Record) was released by ZKP RTLJ in 1982. The album was produced by Tunel member Ljuba Ninković and brought a blend of different musical genres with humorous short stories and imitations between the songs. The song "Dolazim za 7, 9, 13... minuta" ("I'll Be Back in 7, 9, 13... Minutes") was a parody of the hit "Dolazim za 5 minuta" by Yugoslav hard rock band Generacija 5. The album was a huge commercial success, with the songs "Nataša" ("Natasha") and "Vrati se" ("Come Back") becoming the band's first major hits. Until the end of the year, the group held fifteen sold-out concerts in Belgrade's Trade Union Hall.

In 1983, ZKP RTLJ released the band's second studio album Ponovo ploča & druge priče (Another Record & Other Stories). The album was recorded with keyboardist Slobodan Mitić, who came to the band as the replacement for Hristić. The album brought the hits "Sličuge" ("Skates") and "Hvala ti za muziku" ("Thank You for the Music"). As all the male members of the band were of the same age, by the end of 1984 they were all drafted to serve their mandatory stints in the Yugoslav People's Army, and the group made a hiatus, during which Zorica Đermanov and Olivera Perić both decided to retire from the scene.

After male members of the band returned from the army, Poslednja Igra Leptira continued their activity with new female vocalist, Lidija Asanović from Zagreb. PGP-RTB released their third album Opet ploča – Srce od meda (Again, a Record – Heart Made of Honey) in 1985. The album was produced by Rajko Dujmić of Novi Fosili and featured guest appearance by Ljuba Ninković on guitar in the song "Mozak" ("Brain"). Opet ploča – Srce od meda brought the major hit "Dečko, 'ajde o'ladi" ("Chill Out, Boy"). At the end of 1985, the band was awarded the Oscar of Popularity award for the Pop Band of the Year. Despite the success of the album, Asanović moved to Zagreb-based band Srebrna Krila, and the band's new keyboardist became Dragomir Stanojević, who would with Radulović co-author most of the songs for the band's following album.

Poslednja Igra Leptira fourth album Grudi moje Balkanske (My Balkan Heart) was released in 1986 by PGP-RTB. The album was produced by Rajko Dujmić, who also wrote arrangements for most of the songs, and Duško Mandić. The song "Nemoj da me nerviraš" ("Don't Annoy Me") was duet recorded by Radulović and child singer Nataša Gaćeša, who would years later start a career as an opera singer under the stage name Natalie Abbado Gaćeša. The track "Trodupli čovek" ("Triple Man") was based on the main theme from the 1949 film noir The Third Man, and "Šanzelize" ("Champs-Élysées") was a cover of the song "Les Champs-Élysées" by Joe Dassin. The title track, "Umiru jeleni" ("Deer Are Dying") and "Taxi" became large hits.

The fifth album Zajedno smo piškili u pesku (We Used to Pee in the Sand Together) was released in 1987 by PGP-RTB. The album was produced by Kornelije Kovač and featured new guitarist, Dragoljub "Dado" Pejoski. The lyrics for the title song were written by Riblja Čorba frontman Bora Đorđević. The song "Ruska čokolada" ("Russian Chocolate") featured guest appearance by actress Jelica Sretenović on vocals, and at the time little-known Aleksandra Kovač appeared on vocals in the song "Ljubim te" ("I'm Kissing You").

The band ended their activity in 1989.

=== Post breakup ===
After Poslednja Igra Leptira disbanded, Radulović, under the alias Slobodan Đorđević "Piton", recorded the album Niko nema što piton imade (Nobody Has what Python Had), which parodied Yugoslav "newly-composed folk music". He started to work on his second album, but managed to finish only the song "Modra bajka (Sanja zna)" ("Blue Fairytale (Sanja Knows)"), dying of testicular cancer on 12 February 1990.

In 1997, ITMM record label released the compilation album Modra bajka – Best of in 1997, which featured old Poslednja Igra Leptira hits, the song "Modra bajka" and some of the band's live recordings. The album release was followed by a concert held in Belgrade's Sava Centar and featuring well-known Belgrade musicians performing Poslednja Igra Leptira songs.

Dragomir Stanojević continued his musical career as a member of the ethnic music band Bistrik.

== Legacy ==
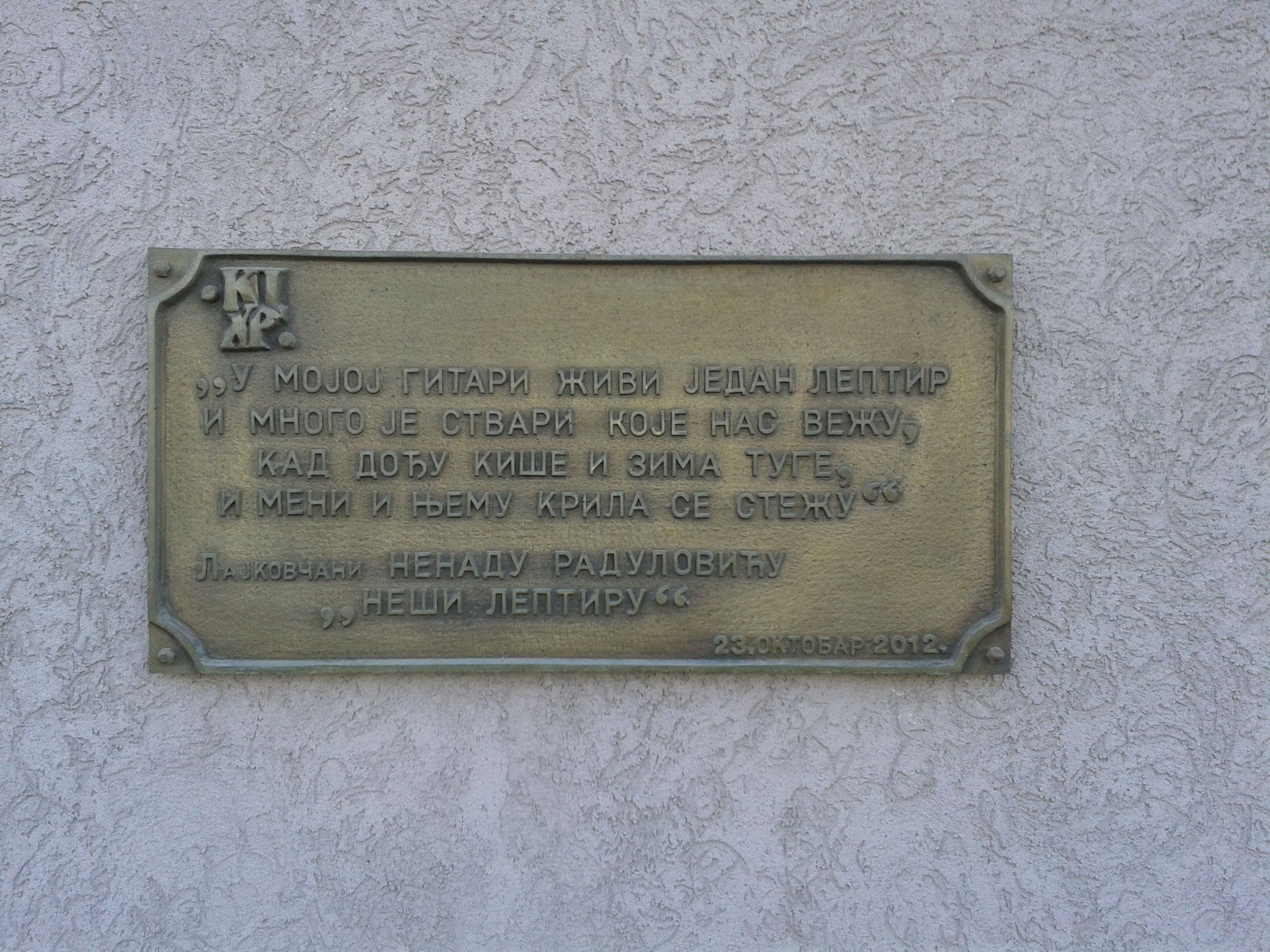
Memorial plaque to Nenad Radulović in Lajkovac

In 2011, on the 30th anniversary of Poslednja Igra Leptira success on Paliluska Olimpijada kulture, a square in front of Palilula Cultural Center was named Plateau of Nenad Radulović and a statue dedicated to Radulović was unveiled on the square. In October 2012, a commemorative plaque in memory of Radulović was unveiled on the Youth Center in the town of Lajkovac, in which Radulović's parents lived after World War II.

Croatian world music band Postolar Tripper covered Poslednja Igra Leptira song "Nataša" on their 2007 album Zamisli život u ritmu cipela za ples (Imagine a Life in the Rhythm of Dancing Shoes). The same song was covered by Croatian tamburica band Arteški Bunar. The song "Umiru jeleni" was covered by Croatian punk rock band Grupa Tvog Života on their 2007 album Kolo je spojilo ljude (Kolo Brought People Together). In 2018, Serbian rock band Neverne Bebe recorded the song "Suze sa zvezda padaju" ("Tears Are Falling from Heaven") on the lyrics originally written by Radulović during last weeks of his life.

The album Napokon ploča was polled in 1998 as 97th on the list of 100 Greatest Yugoslav Popular Music Albums in the book YU 100: najbolji albumi jugoslovenske rok i pop muzike (YU 100: The Best albums of Yugoslav pop and rock music).

In 2011, the song "Nataša" was polled, by the listeners of Radio 202, one of 60 greatest songs released by PGP-RTB/PGP-RTS during the sixty years of the label's existence.

== Discography ==
=== Studio albums ===
- Napokon ploča (1982)
- Ponovo ploča & druge priče (1983)
- Opet ploča – Srce od meda (1985)
- Grudi moje balkanske (1986)
- Zajedno smo piškili u pesku (1987)

=== Compilations ===
- Modra bajka – Best of (1997)
