= Sergio Blažić =

Croatian and Yugoslav musician (1951–1987)

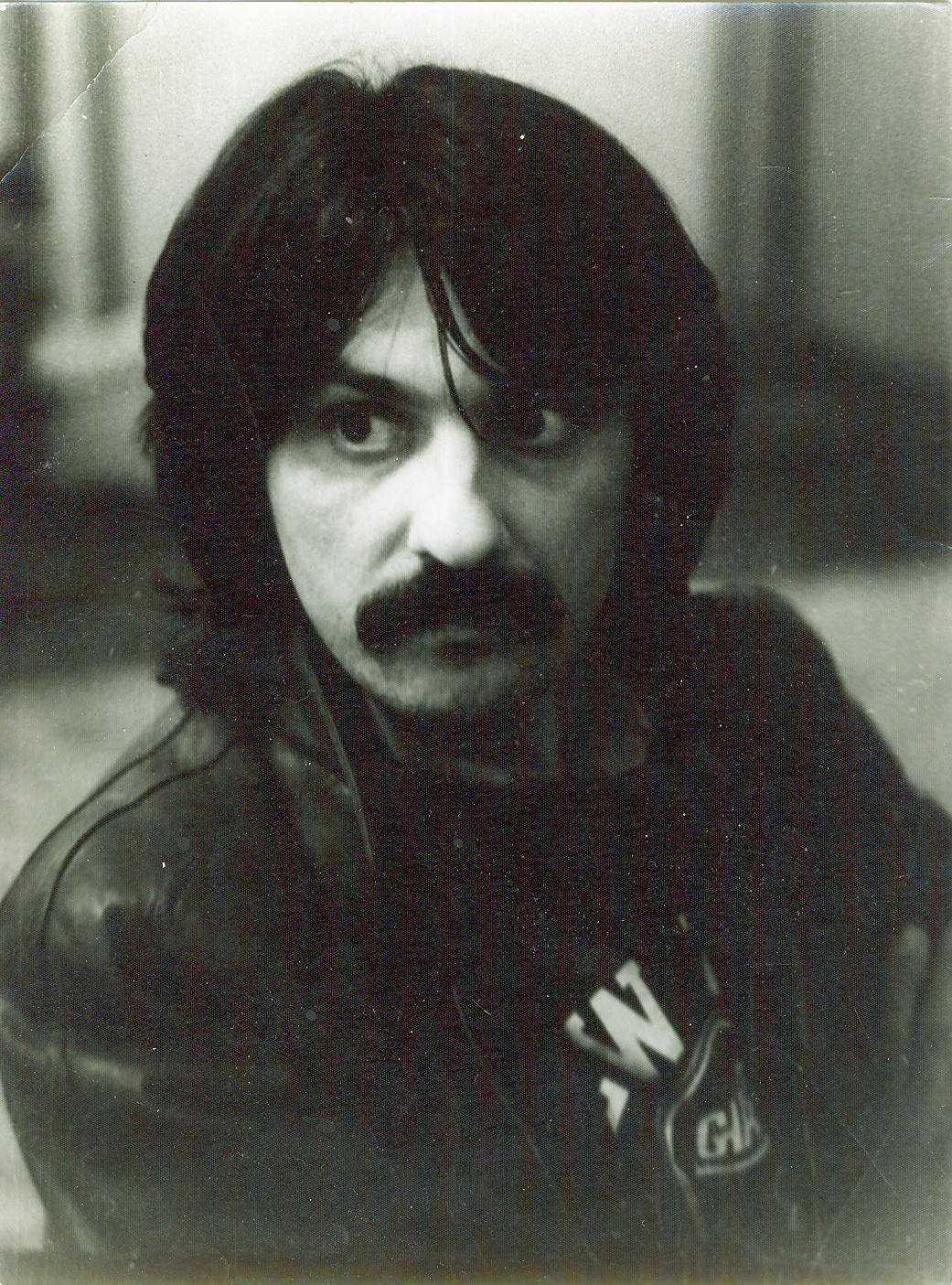
- Sergio Blažić in 1981

Background information
- Also known as: Đoser
- Born: 8 April 1951; Pula, PR Croatia, FPR Yugoslavia
- Died: 18 January 1987 (aged 35) Pula, SR Croatia, SFR Yugoslavia
- Genre: Hard rock
- Years active: 1974–1987
- Formerly of: King Stones; Boomerang; Atomsko Sklonište

Sergio Blažić (8 April 1951 – 18 January 1987), also known by his nickname Đoser, was a Croatian and Yugoslav rock musician, best known as the lead vocalist of popular hard rock band Atomsko Sklonište. Blažić was the group's frontman since its formation in 1977 until his death of Hodgkin lymphoma in 1987, recording seven studio albums and two live albums with the group.

== Biography ==
=== Early career ===
Blažić was born on 8 April 1951 in Pula. He started his career as a singer in Pula rock band King Stones. At the beginning of the 1970s, Blažić (at the time playing the drums), vocalist Branko Umković, and three other future members of Atomsko Sklonište, bass guitarist Bruno Langer, guitarist Dragan Gužvan and drummer Saša Dadić, formed the cover band Hush. In 1974, Langer moved to the band Boomerang from Koper, where he was soon joined by Blažić, the two performing with the group until the autumn of 1976.

=== Atomsko Sklonište ===
The band Atomsko Sklonište was formed in 1977 on the idea of poet Boško Obradović, who aspired to form a band which would perform songs featuring his anti-war lyrics. Blažić was the member of the band since its formation. The group attracted the attention of the public with their anti-war concept and cataclysmic imagery, and gained large mainstream popularity with the release of their debut album Ne cvikaj, generacijo (Don't Be Afraid, My Generation) in 1978. The group maintained their popularity with their live performances and following studio albums, scoring a number of hit songs. Blažić recorded seven studio albums with the band, including the English language album Space Generation for the foreign market, as well as two live albums. In 1985, he took part in the YU Rock Misija project, a Yugoslav contribution to Live Aid, contributing vocals to the song "Za milion godina". He had his last performance with the band on 21 July 1986 in the Pula club Uljanik.

=== Death ===
Blažić has been suffering from Hodgkin's disease since 1971. He died as a result of his illness in Pula on 18 January 1987. It is reported that more than 4,000 people attended his funeral two days later, on 20 January.

== Legacy ==
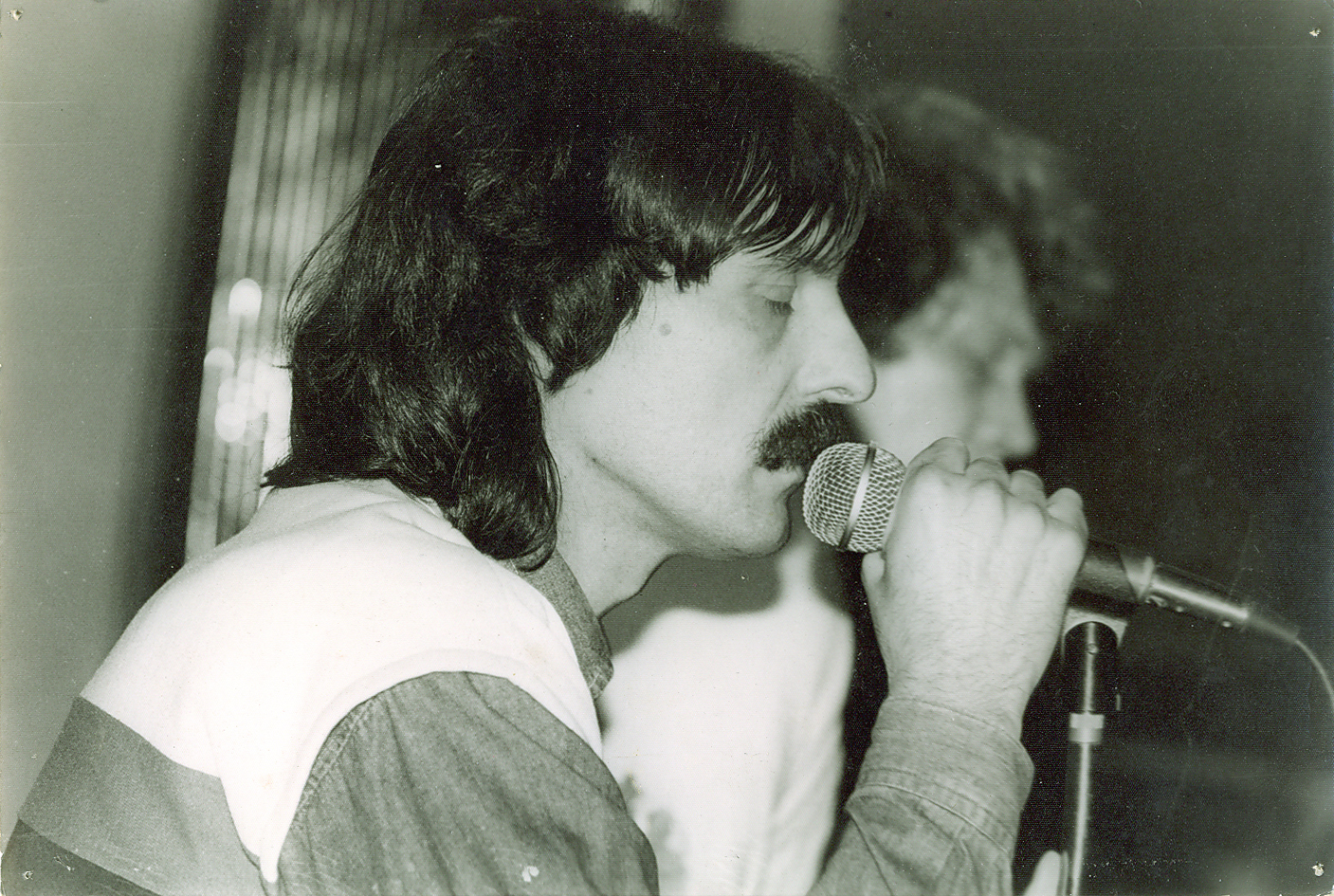
Blažić performing with Atomsko Sklonište in 1981

In memory of Blažić's musical activities and the fight against Hodgkin lymphoma, the Sergio Blažić-Đoser Memorial was held in Pula from 1988 to 2008. It consisted of concerts and futsal tournaments, with all the funds raised dedicated to people fighting cancer.

In 2014, a green area in Krležina street in Pula was officially named Poljana Sergio Blažića-Đosera after him.

In 1998, Atomsko Sklonište's debut album Ne cvikaj, generacijo was polled as 47th on the list of 100 greatest Yugoslav popular music albums in the book YU 100: najbolji albumi jugoslovenske rok i pop muzike (YU 100: The Best albums of Yugoslav pop and rock music). In 2015, the same album was polled as 99th on the list of 100 Greatest Yugoslav Albums published by the Croatian edition of Rolling Stone. In 1987, in YU legende uživo (YU Legends Live), a special publication by Rock magazine, Jednom u životu was proclaimed one of 12 best Yugoslav live albums.

In 2000, "Treba imat dušu", "Ne cvikaj generacijo" and "Pomorac sam, majko", all recorded with Blažić, were polled No.15, No.30 and No.80 respectively on Rock Express Top 100 Yugoslav Rock Songs of All Times list.

== Discography ==
=== With Atomsko Sklonište ===
==== Studio albums ====
- Ne cvikaj generacijo (1978)
- Infarkt (1978)
- U vremenu horoskopa (1980)
- Extrauterina (1981)
- Mentalna higijena (1982)
- Space Generation (as Atomic Shelter, 1983)
- Zabranjeno snivanje (1984)

=== Live albums ===
- Atomska trilogija (1980)
- Jednom u životu (1985)
