= Beer Fest (Live) =

Live album by Osvajači
- Released: 30 September 2022
- Recorded: 20 August 2022
- Venue: Ušće park, Belgrade
- Genre: Hard rock
- Label: Sky Music Publishing

Osvajači chronology
Sad je na mene red (2019)	Beer Fest (Live) (2022)

Beer Fest (Live) is the first live album by Serbian and Yugoslav hard rock band Osvajači, released in 2022. The album was recorded on the performance the band held on 20 August 2022 at Belgrade Beer Fest, and released through Sky Music Publishing in digital format only. Besides the band songs, it includes a cover of Krvna Grupa song "Da te milujem" ("To Caress You") and Smak song "Crna dama" ("Black Lady").

== Track listing ==
No.	Title	Length
1.	"Duša kad izneveri"	5:05
2.	"Da te milujem"	5:35
3.	"Krv i led"	5:27
4.	"Gde da pobegnem"	5:33
5.	"Marija"	5:11
6.	"Crna dama"	4:35
7.	"Možda nebo zna"	5:48
8.	"Pakleni put"	4:01
9.	"Nikad više s tobom"	4:39
10.	"Pesma za kraj"	3:56
11.	"Pronađi me"	5:00
12.	"S kim čekaš dan"	5:32
13.	"Maska"	4:44

== Personnel ==
- Zvonko Pantović - vocals
- Nebojša Jakovljević - keyboards
- Emir Hot - guitar
- Dušan Simović - guitar
- Branislav Blagojević - guitar
- Dejan Ilić - bass guitar
- Nenad Branković - drums

=== Additional personnel ===
- Dražen Sužnjević - recorded by
- Dragan Vukićević - mixed by
