= Aska (group) =

Yugoslavian girl group

Aska was a Yugoslavian girl group. They represented Yugoslavia in the Eurovision Song Contest 1982, where their song "Halo, halo" placed 14th out of 18, with 21 points. It got the top mark of twelve points from the Swedish jury.

The members were Snežana Mišković, Izolda Barudžija and Snežana Stamenković, who retired shortly upon her return from Harrogate and was replaced by Suzana Perović.

Aska recorded several albums before disbanding in 1987 to pursue solo careers. Mišković remained in pop and established a career with her band, Viktorija. Barudžija faded away after two more Eurovision bids in 1983 and 1984. Perović switched to more commercial folk music and released a few albums before vanishing from the music scene. These included the hits "Pobediće ljubav", "Dežurna pesma" and "Istanbul". Her "Princ iz bajke" and "Zašto ljubomoran nisi" were recorded in 1987 for the Serbian comedy Tesna koža 2, in which she played a singer named Suzi.

Aska is one of a number of groups allegedly plagiarized by the 2014 song "Uptown Funk"; the single "Ulice mračne nisu za devojke" ("Dark Streets Are Not for Girls") was written by Snežana Mišković and Momčilo Bajaga for Aska's 1984 album, Katastrofa.

Preceded by Seid Memić	Yugoslavia in the Eurovision Song Contest; 1982	Succeeded by Daniel
