= 1991 – 1995 =

Greatest hits album by Osvajači
- Released: 1997
- Recorded: 1990–1995
- Genre: Hard rock; glam metal; heavy metal
- Length: 70:32
- Label: Take It Or Leave It Records

Osvajači chronology
Sam (1995)	1991 – 1995 (1997)	Vrelina (2000)

1991 – 1995 is a compilation album by Serbian and Yugoslav hard rock band Osvajači, released in 1997 and featuring all the songs from their first two studio albums, Krv i led (trans. Blood and Ice) and Sam (Alone). The compilation is the last album released by the original incarnation of the band, which split soon after the album release.

== Track listing ==
All songs written by Dragan Urošević (music) and Zvonko Pantović (lyrics), except where noted.

No.	Title	Lyrics	Music	Length
1.	"Pronađi me" ("Find Me")			4:28
2.	"Nikad više s tobom" ("Never Again With You")			3:53
3.	"Krv i led" ("Blood and Ice")			4:02
4.	"Sad mi treba" ("Now I Need")			3:57
5.	"Bledi ruž" ("Pale Rouge")			3:00
6.	"Gde da pobegnem" ("Where Can I Escape")			4:09
7.	"Jako srce udara" ("Heart's Beating Hard")			4:32
8.	"Jedna me devojka neće" ("One Girl Doesn't Want Me")	Zvonko Pantović	Ken Hensley	3:42
9.	"Možda nebo zna" ("Maybe Heaven Knows")			5:18
10.	"Duša kad izneveri" ("When the Soul Betrays")			3:36
11.	"Kad me ostave svi" ("When Everybody Leaves Me")			3:30
12.	"Zla noć" ("Evil Night")			3:48
13.	"S kim čekaš dan" ("Who Are You Waiting for the Day With")			4:05
14.	"Maska (Sam)" ("Mask (Alone)")			3:32
15.	"Tiha predaja" ("Silent Surrender")			3:05
16.	"Vreme za ludake" ("Time for Madmen")			3:14
17.	"Iz sve snage" ("With All Might")			3:15
18.	"Pesma za kraj" ("Song for the End")			3:35

== Credits ==
- Zvonko Pantović - vocals
- Dragan Urošević - guitar, producer (tracks: 10–18)
- Miša Raca - drums
- Saša Popović - bass guitar (tracks: 1–9)
- Laza Ristovski - keyboards (tracks: 1–9, 14), producer (tracks: 1–9)
- Dejan Dačović - bass guitar (tracks: 10–18)
- Nebojša Jakovljević - keyboards (tracks: 10–18)
