= Nenad Radulović =

- Born: Nenad Radulović; 13 September 1959; Belgrade, PR Serbia, FPR Yugoslavia
- Died: 12 February 1990 (aged 30); Belgrade, SR Serbia, SFR Yugoslavia
- Resting place: New Bežanija Cemetery, Belgrade
- Other name: Neša Leptir
- Occupations: Singer; songwriter; actor
- Years active: 1979–1990
- Musical career
- Genres: Country; rock; pop rock; comedy rock
- Instruments: Vocals; guitar; percussion; harmonica
- Labels: ZKP RTLJ, PGP-RTB, Ćao Sound, ITMM
- Formerly of: Poslednja Igra Leptira

Nenad Radulović (Serbian Cyrillic: Ненад Радуловић; 13 September 1959 – 12 February 1990), also known under the nickname Neša Leptir (Неша Лептир; transl. Neša the Butterfly) was a Serbian and Yugoslav musician, songwriter and actor, best known as the frontman of the popular pop rock band Poslednja Igra Leptira (Last Dance of the Butterfly).

== Biography ==
=== Poslednja Igra Leptira (1979–1989) ===
Radulović started his musical career in 1979 as vocalist and principal songwriter for the band Poslednja Igra Leptira. The band gained popularity with their commercial pop rock sound and live show which included humorous sketches. Their debut album Napokon ploča (At Last, a Record), released in 1982, brought several hit songs. Radulović released four more successful albums with the band, before the group disbanded in 1989.

=== Solo career (1989–1990) ===
After Poslednja Igra Leptira split up, Radulović, under the alias Slobodan Đorđević "Piton", recorded the album Niko nema što piton imade (Nobody Has what Python Had), which parodied Yugoslav "newly-composed folk music". He started to work on his second album, but managed to finish only the song "Modra bajka (Sanja zna)" ("Blue Fairytale (Sanja Knows)").

=== Other activities ===
Simultaneously with his musical career, Radulović cooperated with Radio Belgrade comedy show Indexovo radio pozorište. He acted in Mića Milošević's 1984 film Moljac (Moth) and in the TV series Dome, slatki dome (Home Sweet Home).

=== Death and legacy ===
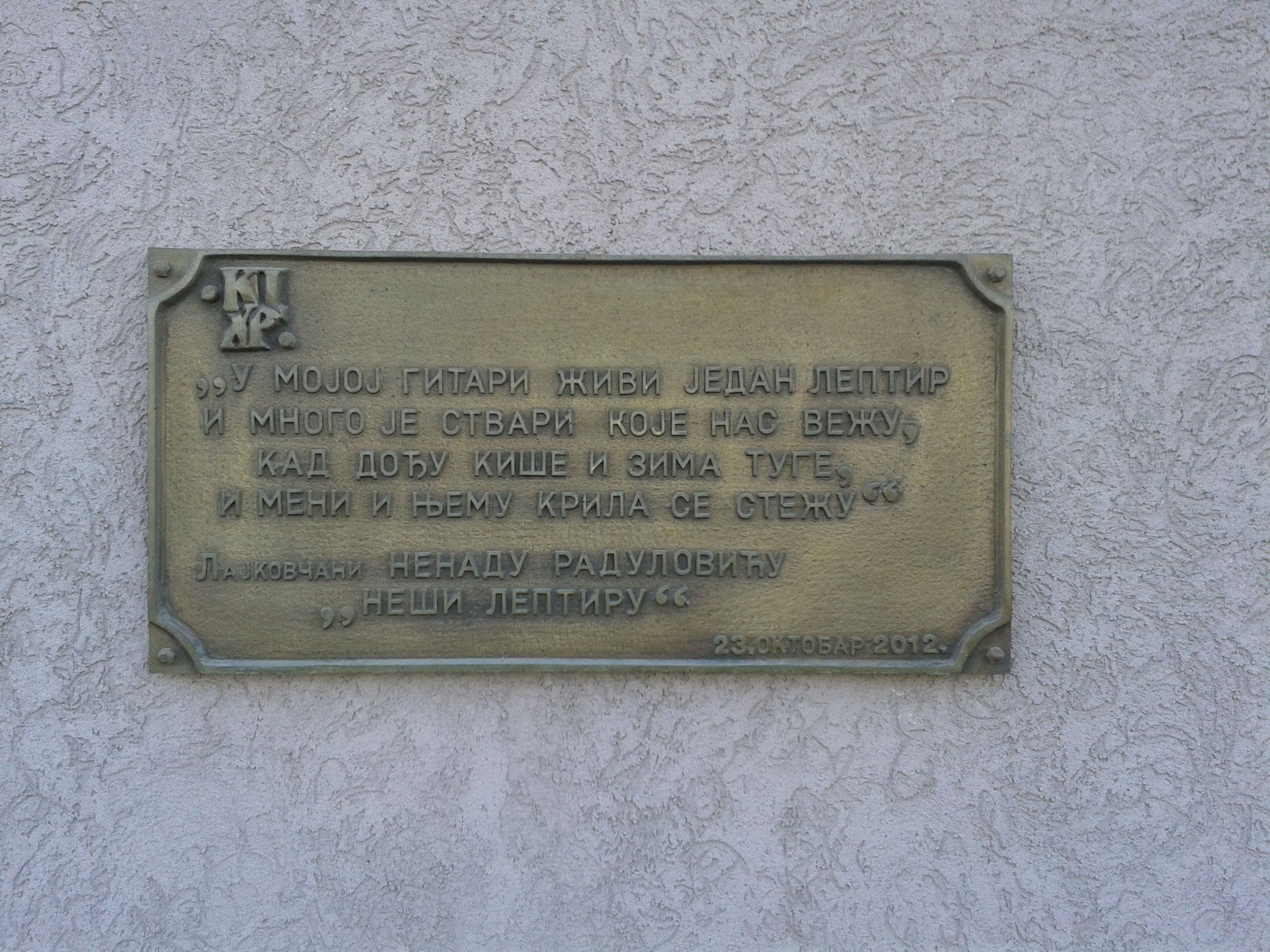
Memorial plaque to Nenad Radulović in Lajkovac

Radulović died of testicular cancer on 12 February 1990. Reputedly, twenty minutes before he died, his brother asked him how he felt; his answer and his reputed last words were: "Well, it's not like I can play football now...".

The last song recorded by Radulović, "Modra bajka", was released posthumously on Poslednja Igra Leptira 1997 compilation album Modra bajka – Best of. In 2018, Serbian rock band Neverne Bebe recorded the song "Suze sa zvezda padaju" ("Tears Are Falling from Heaven") on the lyrics originally written by Radulović during last weeks of his life.

In 2011, on the 30th anniversary of Poslednja Igra Leptira success on Paliluska Olimpijada kulture, a square in front of Palilula Cultural Center was named Plateau of Nenad Radulović and a statue dedicated to Radulović was unveiled on the square. In October 2012, a commemorative plaque in memory of Radulović was unveiled on the Youth Center in the town of Lajkovac, in which Radulović's parents lived after World War II.

Poslednja Igra Leptira album Napokon ploča was polled in 1998 as 97th on the list of 100 Greatest Yugoslav Popular Music Albums in the book YU 100: najbolji albumi jugoslovenske rok i pop muzike (YU 100: The Best albums of Yugoslav pop and rock music).

== Discography ==
=== Poslednja Igra Leptira ===
==== Studio albums ====
- Napokon ploča (1982)
- Ponovo ploča & druge priče (1983)
- Opet ploča – Srce od meda (1985)
- Grudi moje balkanske (1986)
- Zajedno smo piškili u pesku (1987)

==== Compilations ====
- Modra bajka – Best of (1997)

=== Solo ===
==== Studio albums ====
- Niko nema što piton imade (1989)
