= Viktorija (singer) =

Musical artist (born 1958)

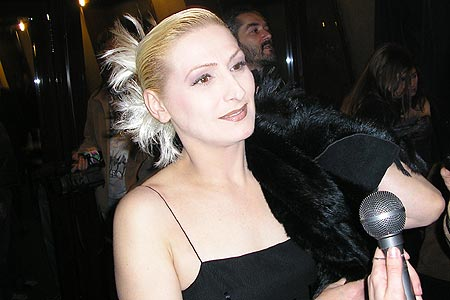
- Viktorija in 2009

Background information
- Born: Snežana Mišković; December 19, 1958 (age 67); Vučitrn, PR Serbia, FPR Yugoslavia
- Origin: Belgrade, Serbia
- Genres: Pop; rock; hard rock; arena rock; pop rock
- Occupation: Singer
- Instrument: Vocals
- Years active: 1976–present
- Labels: Jugoton, Diskos, PGP-RTB, PGP-RTS, ITMM, Košava
- Formerly of: Aska

Snežana Mišković (Serbian: Снежана Мишковић; pronounced [sněʒana mîʃkoʋitɕ]; born 19 December 1958), better known by her stage name Viktorija (Викторија; [ʋǐktoːrija]), is a Serbian and Yugoslav semi-retired rock singer. Known for her raspy voice, Viktorija was one of the most popular and prominent female vocalists of the Yugoslav rock scene.

Mišković rose to prominence in the early 1980s, as the vocalist and the leader of the girl group Aska, releasing two albums with the group and representing Yugoslavia at the 1982 Eurovision Song Contest. In 1986, she disbanded Aska and formed the band Viktorija. Initially, Viktorija was the name of the Mišković-fronted rock group, but soon she adopted Viktorija as her stage name. Viktorija gained nationwide popularity with her 1988 debut album Spavaćeš sam, followed by the equally successful 1991 album Ja verujem, cooperating with a number of prominent Yugoslav songwriters and musicians on both. However, following the release of her third studio album Ja znam da je tebi krivo in 1995, she retired from the scene, making a brief comeback with the 2000 cover album Nostalgija. Since mid-2000s, Viktorija has released new songs and performed live sporadically only.

== Biography ==
=== Early life and career ===
Mišković was born in Vučitrn on 19 November 1958. She came to Belgrade for her studies in 1976, soon starting to perform with Society of Culture and Arts Branko Krsmanović choir and with the band Pop Polifonija (Pop Polyphony).

=== Aska (1981–1986) ===
In 1981, Mišković formed the girl group Aska with Snežana Stamenković and Izolda Barudžija. Aska represented Yugoslavia at the 1982 Eurovision Song Contest with the song "Halo, halo", written by Sanja Ilić, ending up in the 14th place. In 1982, the trio also released their debut album Disco Rock, featuring covers of popular songs by Yugoslav rock artists. In 1983, as a part of cultural exchange between Yugoslavia and Kenya, Aska held twenty concerts in Kenya. The second Aska album, entitled Katastrofa (Catastrophe) and released in 1984, was recorded in the new lineup, featuring Mišković, Suzana Perović and Nariman "Nera" Mahmud. In 1985, Mišković, alongside Snežana Stamenković and Izolda Barudžija, took part in YU Rock Misija, a Yugoslav contribution to the Live Aid campaign, contributing vocals to the charity single "Za milion godina"; in addition, Aska took part in the corresponding charity concert held at Red Star Stadium. From 1984 to 1986, about 25 different singers passed through Aska, Mišković eventually deciding to end the group's activity.

=== Forming of Viktorija, nationwide success and retirement (1986–1997) ===
In 1986, Mišković started her solo career by recording the song "Šarene ulice" ("Colorful Streets"), soon after forming the band Viktorija. Initially, Viktorija was the name of Snežana Mišković-fronted band, but soon she adopted Viktorija as her own stage name. During the following years, Viktorija's backing band would feature a number of musicians, most prominently guitarist Bane Jelić, bass guitarist Slobodan "Cajger" Stojisavljević (formerly of Generacija 5 and Zana), drummer Predrag Jakovljević (formerly of Tilt and Bulevar) and keyboardist Aleksandar Vuksanović, the latter starting a successful solo career in folk music under the stage name Aca Lukas in the 1990s.

In 1988, Viktorija released the album Spavaćeš sam (You'll Be Sleeping Alone), recorded throughout two years in four different studios in Zagreb and Belgrade. The album was produced by Theodore Yanni, who also played guitar on several tracks, and the recording featured Piloti member Safet Petrovac (guitar), Ekatarina Velika member Bojan Pečar (bass guitar), studio musician Nenad Stefanović "Japanac" (bass guitar), Animatori member Tomislav Brezičević "Toco" (drums), Bijelo Dugme member Laza Ristovski (keyboards) and Rex Ilusivii (emulator programming). The album also featured numerous guest appearances – by Riblja Čorba frontman Bora Đorđević (vocals), former Aska member Izolda Barudžija (backing vocals), Ekatarina Velika frontman Milan Mladenović (backing vocals) and the members of the pop band Sunčeve Pege (Sun Spots). The album cover was designed by renowned comic book artist Zoran Janjetov. Spavaćeš sam saw large commercial success, bringing the hits "Barakuda" ("Barracuda"), written by Piloti frontman Kiki Lesendrić, "Spavaćeš sam", written by Osmi Putnik frontman Zlatan Stipišić, "Sami" ("Alone"), a cover of Ohio Express' song "Yummy Yummy Yummy" with lyrics written by Bora Đorđević, and the ballad "Daj, ne pitaj" ("Please, Don't Ask"), co-written by Stipišić and Đorđević. In 1989, Mišković was voted the Best Female Singer by the readers of Pop Rock magazine. At the beginning of 1990, Viktorija, alongside Yugoslav bands Riblja Čorba, Valentino, Galija and Bajaga i Instruktori, performed in Timișoara, Romania, at the three-day concerts organized two months after the Romanian Revolution. All five acts performed on three concerts in Timișoara Olympia Hall in front of some 20,000 people each night. During the same year, Mišković won the Female Singer of the Year Award at the MESAM music festival.

At the beginning of 1991, Viktorija released her second studio album, Ja verujem (I Believe). The album was recorded in Radio Pula studio, the recording featuring Bane Jelić, Vjekoslav Zajec, Vladimir Negovanović and former Parni Valjak member Rastko Milošev on guitar, Nenad Stefanović "Japanac" on bass guitar, and Laza Ristovski and Bajaga i Instruktori member Saša Lokner on keyboards. The songs were composed by Jelić, Zlatan Stipišić, Bajaga i Instruktori members Nenad Stamatović, Žika Milenković and Saša Lokner, Kiki Lesendrić and Dragan Čačinović, while the lyrics were written by Bora Đorđević, Marina Tucaković, Radoman Kanjevac, Milja Vujanović and Nikola Grbić. The song "A ja bez tebe" ("And Me Without You") featured the lyrics written in early 1970s by actor Ljubiša Bačić and dedicated to actress Milena Dravić. Ja verujem eventually became diamond record, owing to hit songs "Rat i mir (Ljubav je...)" ("War and Peace (Love Is...)", a duet with Kiki Lesendrić (which revolved around a musical theme from Marty Friedman's "Thunder March"), "Arija" ("Aria"), "Od Splita do Beograda (Ove Noći)" ("From Split to Belgrade (This Night)"), a duet with Dino Dvornik, "Samo teraj ti po svome" ("You Just Carry On"), "Kanada" ("Canada"), "Ni nebo mi nije visoko" ("Even Sky Doesn't Seem that High") and "Isus" ("Jesus"). During the same year, Viktorija recorded a cover of Zdravko Čolić's hit "Ljubav je samo reč" ("Love Is Only a Word") for the Evergereen Evening of Belgrade Spring Festival. The song was released on the festival's official compilation album Beograde ((Oh,) Belgrade), but also on Viktorija's 1992 compilation album Viktorija. In 1992, she held her first solo concert in Belgrade, in Sava Centar.

In 1995, she released her third album, Ja znam da je tebi krivo (I Know You're Jealous), produced by Vojislav Aralica. The album songs were co-authored by Aralica, Stevan Todorović and Rambo Amadeus. The album featured a number of cover songs – a cober of Bijelo Dugme's "A koliko si ih imala do sad" ("How Much of Them Did You Have 'till Now"), Viktorija's version entitled "Avantura – ljubomora" ("Adventure – Jealousy"), a cover of Zdravko Čolić's "Zagrli me" ("Hug Me"), Viktorija's version entitled "Ako priđeš bliže" ("If You Come Closer"), a cover of Jovanotti's "Io penso positivo", Viktorija's version featuring Serbian language lyrics and entitled "Ja znam da je tebi krivo", and a cover of Foreigner song "Blinded by Science", Viktorija's version entitled "Lokomotiva" ("Locomotive"). During 1996, she promoted the album with a large number of concerts, on which she performed with a band consisting of young musicians from Kosovska Mitrovica.

In 1997, she announced her retirement from the scene. The compilation album Kada gužva prođe (When the Rush Is Over) was released in 1998.

=== Occasional comebacks (2000–present) ===
In 2000, Viktorija made a brief comeback, only to record the cover album Nostalgija (Nostalgia), which featured covers of songs by Parni Valjak, Regata, Xenia, Indexi, Kerber, Atomsko Sklonište, Smak, Bijelo Dugme, Oliver Mandić, D' Boys, Toni Montano, and other acts. In 2000, she also recorded the song "Senke uspomena" ("Shadows of Memories"), written by Kiki Lesendrić, for Predrag Velinović's 2000 film Shadows of Memories.

In 2005, after a number years she spent away from the public, Viktorija appeared at Beovizija music festival performing the song "Kaži, sestro" ("Say, Sister"), winning sixth place. Five years later, at the very end of 2010, she released the single "Spas" ("Salvation").

In 2015, Viktorija saw new attention, when her claims of Mark Ronson and Bruno Mars plagiarizing Aska song "Ulice mračne nisu za devojke" ("Dark Streets Are Not for Girls") for the 2014 song "Uptown Funk" appeared in Serbian and foreign media; the song "Ulice mračne nisu za devojke" was written by Snežana Mišković and Momčilo Bajagić "Bajaga" for Aska's 1984 album Katastrofa.

=== Reality TV ===
Mišković was a contestant of the reality TV shows Farma, Season 1 and Zadruga, Season 1

== Legacy ==
Viktorija's song "Barakuda" was covered in 1999 by Serbian rock band Negative for their debut self-titled album. In 2011, "Barakuda" was voted by the listeners of Radio 202 as one of 60 greatest songs released by PGP-RTB/PGP-RTS during the sixty years of the label's existence.

In 1998, the album Spavaćeš sam was ranked at number 49 on the list of 100 Greatest Yugoslav Popular Music Albums in the book YU 100: najbolji albumi jugoslovenske rok i pop muzike (YU 100: The Best Albums of Yugoslav Pop and Rock Music).

== Discography ==
=== Studio albums ===
- Spavaćeš sam (1988)
- Ja verujem (1991)
- Ja znam da je tebi krivo (1995)

=== Compilations ===
- Viktorija (1991)
- Kada gužva prođe (1998)

=== Live albums ===
- Nostalgija (2000)

=== Singles ===
- "Kaži, sestro" (2005)
- "Spas" (2010)

Preceded by Vajta	Yugoslavia in the Eurovision Song Contest (as part of Aska); 1982	Succeeded by Daniel
