= Suzana Perović =

Serbian singer

Suzana Perović Сузана Перовић
- Birth name: Suzana Ristivojević
- Born: 16 August 1966 (age 58); Belgrade, SR Serbia, SFR Yugoslavia
- Genres: Pop-folk; pop
- Occupations: Singer; TV personality
- Instrument: Vocals
- Labels: PGP-RTB; MAT

Suzana Perović (née Ristivojević; Serbian Cyrillic: Сузана Перовић; born 16 August 1966) is a Serbian singer and television personality. Born in Belgrade, she debuted as a member the pop girl group Aska, with whom she released one studio album, Katastrofa (1984). Perović subsequently pursued a solo career as a folk singer and has released four albums.

She is arguably best known for her performances of the songs "Zašto ljubomoran nisi" and "Princ iz bajke" in the 1987 sequel of the comedy film Tesna koža. Additionally, Perović competed on the reality television shows Farma (2013) and Zadruga (2018-2019). She also hosted the Serbian version of the American series Cheaters.

From her marriage with business manager Vlada Perović she has a son and a daughter.

== Discography ==
With Aska

- Katastrofa (1984)

Solo albums

- Opa, opa, sele (1986)
- Maštam o tebi (1987)
- Pobediće ljubav (1990)
- U meni neki vrag (1994)

== Filmography ==
Filmography of Suzana Perović
Year	Title	Genre	Role	Notes
1987	Tesna koža	Film	as singer Suzi	
2008	Seljaci	Television	as Nikoleta	Three episodes
2010-2013	Preljubnici	Television	Herself	Host
2013	Farma	Television	Herself	Season 5; Eliminated
2018-2019	Zadruga	Television	Herself	Season 2, 9th place
