= Bane Jelić =

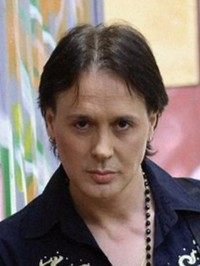
- Jelić in August 2015.

Background information
- Born: 11 June 1967 (age 59); Belgrade, SR Serbia, SFR Yugoslavia
- Genres: rock, instrumental,
- Occupations: Musician, painter and writer.
- Instruments: Guitar, bass, vocals, drums
- Years active: 1979–present
- Labels: PGP-RTS, Mascom Records, Take It Or Leave It Records
- Website: www.banejelic.com

Bane Jelić (born 11 June 1967), is a Serbian rock musician, painter, and writer.

== Early life ==
Bane Jelic was born in Belgrade, Serbia. At the age of ten he started to play the acoustic guitar, and for his twelfth birthday he received an electrical guitar and an amplifier. According to his own words, he spent, on average, ten hours every day.

== Music career ==
When Jelic was only 12 years old, he created his first musical band, The Flying Cans, with his friends. The band played both Yugoslav and foreign songs. Next year, in 1980, he joined a heavy metal band Apocalypse, and performed in 1981 alongside older musicians at a large venue in Belgrade's Tašmajdan pool. The master of ceremonies was Vladimir Janković Džet. The concert was broadcast live by the radio station "Beograd 202". During this event the fourteen years old Jelic gave his first interview from the stage.

Jelic started his professional career with Magično oko band in 1984. The band had several tours across Yugoslavia, made a number of concerts and appearances on radio and TV. When Yugoslavia took part in Live Aid in 1985, organizing a venue on Belgrade's Red Star soccer club stadium, Magično oko opened the concert.

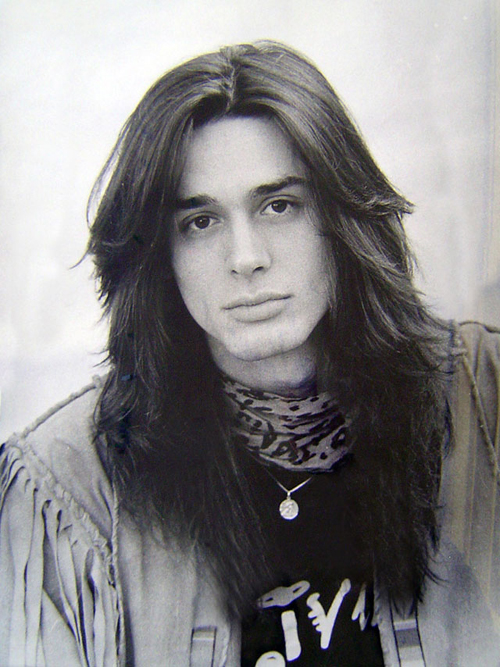
Jelić in 1990.

In 1987 Jelic went to serve the mandatory military service. He became the leader of a military band and in this capacity spent the entire service time playing with the band in a military centre (Dom JNA).

Later Jelic joined Peđa The Boys Band, and composed most of the music, and wrote most of the lyrics for their third album in 1987.

In 1989, Jelic joined Viktorija band, and spent the next three and a half years playing with them, composing the music and the lyrics for some of their most successful hits – "Rat i mir" and "Od Splita do Beograda".

In 1993, alongside Milan and Vladan Đurđević, and Čeda Macura Jelic founded Neverne Bebe. During that period, Neverne bebe recorded an album for Take it or Leave it Records.

At the same time, Jelic started working on an instrumental album called Universe, that was published by PGP-RTS as a limited edition, in 2002.

In 1999, Jelic joined Osvajači (The Conquerors), where he participated in two of the band's albums, and performed throughout Serbia and Montenegro and Europe.

Since 2002 Jelic endorses Ibanez guitars.

In 2003 Jelic created a new instrumental album East-West, which he produced, mixed and mastered. This album was published in 2015.

In 2004 Jelic released the album "The Ultra Extreme". This material was in the making from 1984 till 1994, and was recorded on a standard tape recorder at home, from the first hand without repetition or overdubbing. The album includes cover versions of Niccolo Paganini’s 5th, 11th and 16th caprices, Moto Perpetuo, as well as Rimsky-Korsakov’s "Flight of the Bumblebee". Jelic also composed his own two caprices – "La ruota della vita", which was played in staccato technique and "La fuga del salmone" in arpeggio technique. Jelic plays also Joe Satriani's caprice "Power Cosmic" but faster than the original.

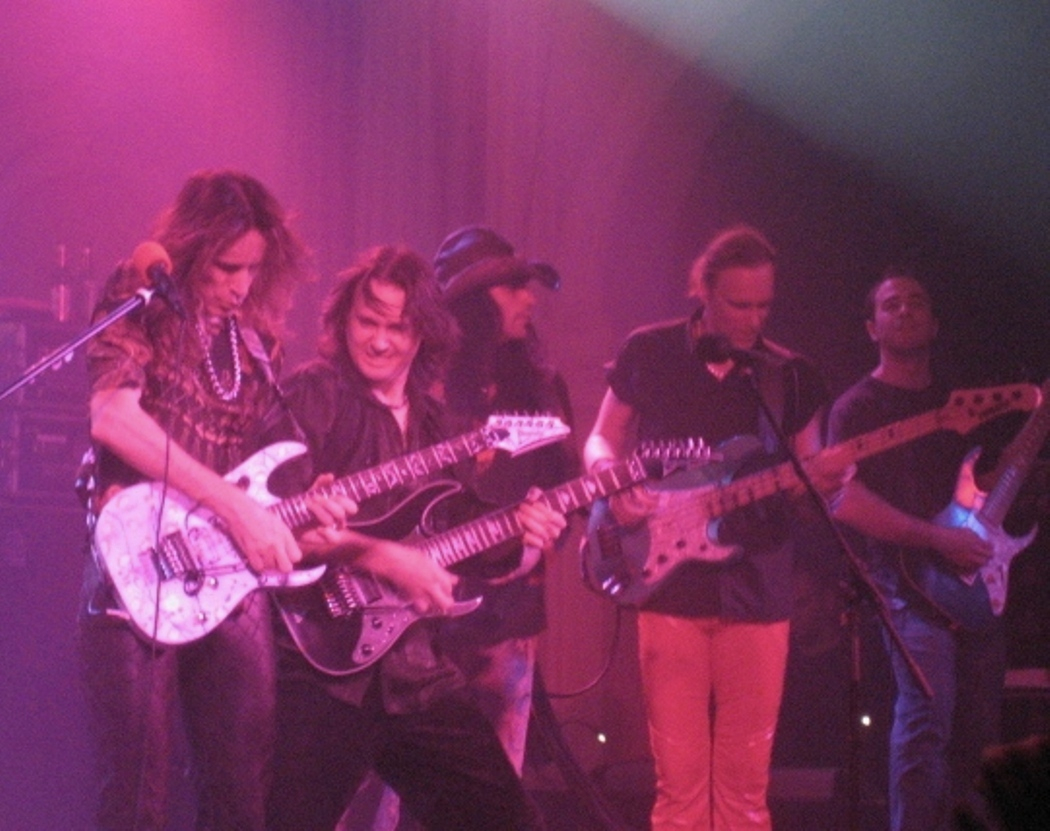
Jelić jamming with Steve Vai in Belgrade during November 2005.

During his Real Illusions Tour in 2005, Steve Vai performed in Belgrade's SKC and invited Jelić to be a guest artist. They had a jam session on the song "My Guitar Wants to Kill Your Mama"

In 2007, Bane published his progressive pop-rock album Srce zmaja (Dragon's heart), writing the music and lyrics, and performing both the instrumental and vocal sections on the album.

Between April and June 2007 Bane was engaged in a project for Evolucija, a Serbian and Swiss gothic metal band, creating all music, lyrics, arrangements as well as producing, mastering, mixing and playing guitars. This album was released by Take it or Leave it Records.

Bane performed with Osvajači and in December 2015 they published their 7-th album Sad je na mene red (Now it's my turn) for Pop Music Records.

Also, in November 2015 Bane Jelic published his new instrumental album East-West for Take It Or Leave It Records 2015. Collaboration with the video group Tijan song Light at the end of the tunnel.

2017 album Put do srca Take It Or Leave It Records. 2019. Collaboration on the video of the group Chetvorka (Igor Vukojević) silk songs. 2020. makes music and lyrics for the group Twins, songs: Blue Elephant 2, Bomb and Nirvana and the song Extra for Grand Production.

2020, collaboration with Nick Z. Marino singer and keyboardist of guitarist Yngwie Malmsteen.

2021, he has been playing with the group ZAR from Munich. They released the album Zurim for Croatia Records.

2025. Bane Jelić and Andrej Andrejević release a single, an instrumental track The Road to Jerusalem, for PGP - RTS

In 2025, Bane Jelić released his new instrumental album Illuminations for Sky Entertainment (Sky Music)

== Painting, Literature and Music ==
Solo exhibitions of paintings 2019. Pedagogical Museum, Belgrade 2019. Cultural Center, Paracin 2019. Cultural Center, Batočina 2019. Cultural Center, Vršac 2019. Cultural Center, Bijeljina - Prot fest, collective exhibition 2020. Pedagogical Museum, Belgrade 2020. UMMUS, Kragujevac - collective exhibition 2020. Cultural Center, Novi Sad 2020. Cultural Center, Kraljevo 2020. Dom kulture, Trstenik 2020. Cultural Center, Krusevac 2020. Cultural Center, Paraćin 2020. Home of Youth, Kragujevac 2020. Cultural Center, Smederevo 2020. Cultural Center, Požarevac 2021. Pedagogical Museum, Belgrade 2021. Cultural and tourist center "Stefan Nemanja" - Lapovo. International collective exhibition. 2022. UMMUS, Kragujevac - collective exhibition 2023. Nikola Radošević, Beograd. 2021. UMMUS, Kragujevac 2024. Nikola Radošević, Beograd. International collective exhibition.

He received recognition from the Tesla Science Foundation 

for his participation in the exhibition and a medal for a painting on the subject of Nikola Tesla.

Oneline Bane Jelic Art - https://www.serbianaart.rs/umetnici/jelic-bane/

LITERATURE

In addition to music and painting, Bane is also involved in literature. He published works in the literary anthology "Arte stich" (3 and 4) in Belgrade in 2015 and 2016 and in the magazine "Svetosavsko ognjište" (2016 and 2017, Johannesburg). In 2017, he published his first book in a surrealist form called "Fire Mirror" for the publishing house Logos. The promotion of the book was also held at the Prot Fest in Bijeljina in 2019. At the book fair at the Logos stand, he promoted and signed books. In 2025, Banet's novel titled "The Last Joker" will be published by the publishing house IBN Studio.

The book Mirror of Fire - http://logos.in.rs/sr/book/%D0%BE%D0%B3%D1%9A%D0%B5%D0%BD%D0%BE-%D0%BE%D0%B3%D0%BB%D0%B5%D0%B4%D0%B0%D0%BB%D0%BE/

Novel, The Last Joker - - https://ibn.rs/knjige/bane-jelic-poslednji-dzoker/#:~:text=O%20Autoru,Boy%2C%20Zar%20Band%2C%20itd.

== Discography ==
=== Albums ===
- Universe (2002), PGP-RTS
- The Ultra Extreme (2004), Performance Records
- Srce zmaja (2007), Mascom Records
- East-West (2015), Take It Or Leave It Records
- Put do srca (2017), Take It Or Leave It Records
- History (2020), Take It Or Leave It Records
- Illuminations (2025), Sky Entertainment, (Sky Music)

=== With Osvajači ===
- Vino crveno (1999), Grand Production
- Nevera (2000), Grand Production
- Crno oko (2002), City Records
- Sad je na mene red (2015), Pop Music Records – Grand Production
