= Sam (Osvajači album) =

Studio album by Osvajači
- Released: 1995
- Studio: Studio Orange, Kragujevac
- Genre: Hard rock; glam metal; heavy metal
- Length: 33:31
- Label: PGP-RTS
- Producer: Branislav Narandžić; Dragan Urošević

Osvajači chronology
Krv i led (1990)	Sam (1995)	1991 – 1995 (1997)

Sam (trans. Alone) is the second studio album from Serbian and Yugoslav hard rock band Osvajači, released in 1995.

Sam is the band's first album recorded with keyboardist Nebojša Jakovljević, and the last studio album released by the original incarnation of the band, which split up two years after the album release.

== Background ==
Beside original members of Osvajači, vocalist Zvonko Pantović, guitarist Dragan Urošević and drummer Miša Raca, Sam recording featured keyboardist Nebojša Jakovljević, who came in as the replacement for the original keyboardist Laza Ristovski, and bass guitarist Dejan Dačović, who replaced the original bass guitarist Saša Popović. Ristovski made a guest appearance on the album, playing keyboards in the song "Maska (Sam)" "Mask (Alone)". Ana Spasić, Jelisaveta Stamenković (vocalist for the band Agata), Mijo Babalj (former vocalist for the band Cveće) and Slobodan Ljubisavljević all made guest appearances on backing vocals.

== Track listing ==
All songs written by Dragan Urošević (music) and Zvonko Pantović (lyrics).

No.	Title	Length
1.	"Duša kad izneveri" ("When the Soul Betrays")	3:36
2.	"Kad me ostave svi" ("When Everybody Leaves Me")	3:30
3.	"Zla noć" ("Evil Night")	3:48
4.	"S kim čekaš dan" ("Who Are You Waiting for the Day With")	4:05
5.	"Maska (Sam)" ("Mask (Alone)")	3:32
6.	"Tiha predaja" ("Silent Surrender")	3:05
7.	"Vreme za ludake" ("Time for Madmen")	3:14
8.	"Iz sve snage" ("With All Might")	3:15
9.	"Pesma za kraj" ("Song for the End")	3:35

== Personnel ==
- Zvonko Pantović - vocals
- Dragan Urošević - guitar, producer
- Nebojša Jakovljević - keyboards
- Dejan Dačović - bass guitar
- Miša Raca - drums

=== Additional personnel ===
- Laza Ristovski - keyboards (on track 5)
- Ana Spasić - backing vocals (on tracks: 2, 9)
- Jelisaveta Stamenković - backing vocals (on tracks: 2, 9)
- Mijo Babalj - backing vocals (on tracks: 7, 8)
- Slobodan Ljubisavljević - backing vocals (on tracks: 7, 8)
- Branislav Narandžić - producer, recorded by
- Ivan Grujić - recorded by
- Vidan Papić - cover design

== Reception and legacy ==
The album's biggest hit upon its release was the ballad "S kim čekaš dan".

The song "Maska (Sam)" was covered by Serbian progressive/power metal band Alogia on their 2006 live album Priče o vremenu i životu – Live at SKC (Tales of Time and Life – Live at SKC), Dragan Urošević making a guest appearance on the song.

In 2011, "Maska (Sam)" was polled, by the listeners of Radio 202, one of 60 greatest songs released by PGP-RTB/PGP-RTS during the sixty years of the label's existence.
