= Zvonko Pantović =

Serbian singer

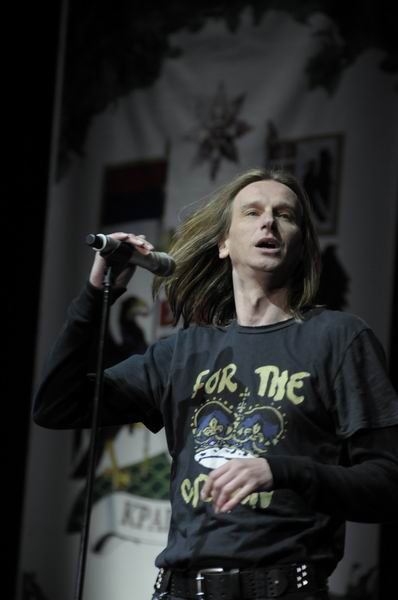
- Zvonko Pantović performing live with Čipi & Industrija in Kragujevac

Background information
- Also known as: Čipi
- Born: 23 May 1966 (age 60)
- Genres: Hard rock, glam metal, heavy metal, rock, pop rock, folk rock, pop-folk
- Occupations: Singer, songwriter
- Instrument: vocals
- Years active: 1990–present
- Labels: PGP-RTB, PGP-RTS, Grand Production, City Records

Zvonko Pantović (Serbian Cyrillic: Звонко Пантовић), also known as Čipi (Chippie) (Serbian Cyrillic: Чипи), is a Serbian vocalist, best known as the lead singer and songwriter for the Serbian and former Yugoslav hard rock/heavy metal band, Osvajači, and Serbian rock/pop/folk band All Stars Osvajači.

== Discography ==
=== With Osvajači ===
==== Studio albums ====
- Krv i led (1991)
- Sam (1995)
- Sad je na mene red (2015)

==== Live albums ====
- Beer Fest (Live) (2022)

==== Compilations ====
- 1991 - 1995 (1997)

==== Singles ====
- Voda i plamen (for Beovizija) (2019)
- Možda nebo zna/Pronađi me (Miguel Salvas remixes) (2019)
- Više neće biti nas (feat. Dragi Jelić and Zele Lipovača) (2025)

==== Collaborations ====
- PLAVA KRV (Iceland session) with Devito (2025)

=== With All Stars Osvajači ===
==== Studio albums ====
- Vino crveno (1998)
- Nevera (2000)
- Crno oko (2002)

=== With Čipi i Industrija ===
==== Studio albums ====
- Na Balkanu (2010)
