= Krv i led =

Studio album by Osvajači
- Released: 1991
- Recorded: Summer of 1990
- Venue: Laza Ristovski Studio, Belgrade
- Genre: Hard rock; glam metal
- Length: 37:01
- Label: PGP-RTB
- Producer: Laza Ristovski; Vlada Negovanović

Osvajači chronology
Krv i led (1991)	Sam (1995)

Krv i led (trans. Blood and Ice) is the debut album from Serbian and Yugoslav hard rock band Osvajači, released in 1991.

== Background and recording ==
Osvajači were formed in 1990 by Zvonko Pantović "Čipi" (vocals), Dragan Urošević (guitar), Saša Popović (bass guitar) and Miša Raca (drums), veteran keyboardist Laza Ristovski, known as a former member of Smak and Bijelo Dugme, as well as for his solo work, soon getting involved in the band's activity and becoming an official member. The band recorded their glam metal-oriented debut in Ristovski's Belgrade studio during the summer of 1990. The album was co-produced by Ristovski and Vlada Negovanović. It included a cover of Uriah Heep's "Stealin", entitled "Jedna me devojka neće" ("One Girl Doesn't Want Me").

== Track listing ==
All songs written by Dragan Urošević (music) and Zvonko Pantović (lyrics), except where noted.

No.	Title	Lyrics	Music	Length
1.	"Pronađi me" ("Find Me")			4:28
2.	"Nikad više s tobom" ("Never Again With You")			3:53
3.	"Krv i led" ("Blood and Ice")			4:02
4.	"Sad mi treba" ("Now I Need")			3:57
5.	"Bledi ruž" ("Pale Rouge")			3:00
6.	"Gde da pobegnem" ("Where Can I Escape")			4:09
7.	"Jako srce udara" ("Heart's Beating Hard")			4:32
8.	"Jedna me devojka neće" ("One Girl Doesn't Want Me")	Zvonko Pantović	Ken Hensley	3:42
9.	"Možda nebo zna" ("Maybe Heaven Knows")			5:18

== Personnel ==
- Zvonko Pantović – vocals
- Dragan Urošević – guitar
- Saša Popović – bass guitar
- Miša Raca – drums
- Laza Ristovski – keyboards, music arrangements, producer

=== Additional personnel ===
- Vlada Negovanović – producer
- Vidan Papić – cover design

== Reception and legacy ==
The album's biggest hit upon its release was the ballad "Možda nebo zna".

In 2021, the song "Gde da pobegnem" was ranked 37th and "Pronađi me" was ranked 41st on the list of 100 Greatest Yugoslav Hard & Heavy Anthems by web magazine Balkanrock.
