= Another Late Night: Kid Loco =

Compilation album by Kid Loco
- Released: 10 February 2003
- Genre: Electronica
- Label: Azuli, Whoa
- Producer: Kid Loco

Kid Loco chronology
Kill Your Darlings - Instrumental Version (2002)	Another Late Night: Kid Loco (2003)	The Graffiti Artist (Original Soundtrack) (2005)

Another Late Night chronology
Tommy Guerrero (2002)	Kid Loco (2003)	Nightwares on Wax (2003)

Professional ratings
Review scores
Source	Rating
Allmusic	4/5 stars

Another Late Night: Kid Loco is a DJ mix album, mixed by Kid Loco. It is the seventh in the Another Late Night / Late Night Tales series. It was released on 10 February 2003 on Late Night Tales in the UK (catalogue no. ALNCD07).

== Track listing ==
1. Mizrab - Gábor Szabó
2. Hard Stuff - The Herbaliser
3. Ancoats 2 Zambia (Geoff Barrow mix) - The Baby Namboos
4. Religion I - Public Image Ltd.
5. Uplink - Stratus
6. Barcelone - Tommy Hools
7. Cold Spin - Zero Theory
8. Fall Break - Aim
9. Nana Reprise - Frankie Valentine
10. Tubular Belgian In My Goldfield - Departure Lounge
11. Summer Love (Beyond There Mix) - Billy Wright
12. So Blue It's Black (Heavy Manners Mix) - The Underwolves
13. 183 (Head Nod) - DJ Crystl
14. Top Dog (New version) - Markus Kienzl
15. Wade In Water - Harvey Mandel
16. Lilly Hall - Kraze One & Aniis Le Neve
17. The Domino Boys - Up, Bustle & Out
18. Street Preacher - Troublemakers
19. Spooked - Flevans
20. Paralysed - Kid Loco
21. Attitude - Marie et les Garçons
22. Rashida - Jon Lucien
23. Peepshow - written by Nick Walker, read by Sir Patrick Moore
