= Tír na nÓg (disambiguation) =

Tír na nÓg is an otherworldly realm in Irish mythology.

Tír na nÓg may also refer to:

- Tír na nÓg (band), an Irish band founded in the early 1970s
- Tír na nÓg (album), the first album by Irish band Tír na nÓg
- Tir na n'Og, a Serbian band specializing in Irish folk music, renamed Alfapop in 2008
- Tir na n'Og (album), the first album by Serbian band Tir na n'Og
- Tir na n'Og (EP), EP by English band Maruja
- "Tír na nÓg", a song by Celtic Woman from their 2016 album Celtic Woman: Destiny
- "Tir Nan Og", a song by Alcest from the 2007 album Souvenirs d'un autre monde
- "Tir Na Nog", a song by Van Morrison from the 1986 album No Guru, No Method, No Teacher
- Tir Na Nog (video game), a 1984 computer game
- Tir na n-Og Award, abbreviated TnaO, a set of annual children's literary awards in Wales from 1976
- Mystic Knights of Tir Na Nog, a live-action show from 1998 by Saban Entertainment
- "The Land-of-the-ever-Young" (Tir-nan-Og), a work for brass band by Granville Bantock, 1945
- "Tir-na Nog'th", a place in the fantasy novel series The Chronicles of Amber, 1970-1991
- Tir na nOg (Shadowrun), a 1993 supplement for the role-playing game Shadowrun
