= The Fields of Athenry =

1979 song written by Pete St. John

Song
- Published: 1979
- Genre: Irish folk
- Songwriter: Pete St. John

"The Fields of Athenry" is an Irish folk ballad written in 1979 by Pete St John. Set during the Great Famine of the 1840s, the song's lyrics feature a fictional man from near Athenry in County Galway, who stole food for his starving family and has been sentenced to transportation to the Australian penal colony at Botany Bay. It has become a popular anthem for Irish sports supporters.

== History ==
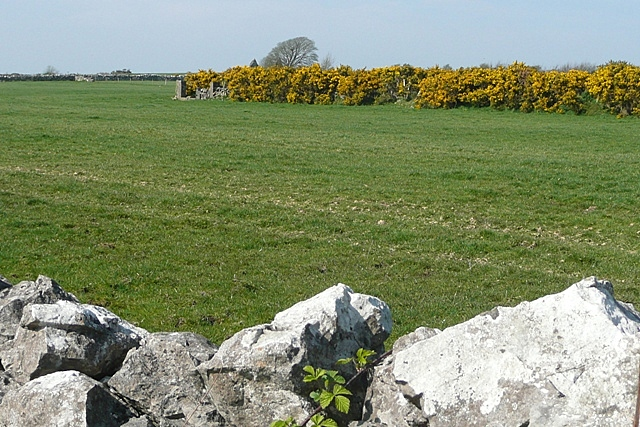
Typical field near Athenry

"The Fields of Athenry" was written in 1979 by Pete St John, who stated he heard a story about a young man from the Athenry area who had been caught stealing grain to feed his family during the Irish famine years, and was deported to Australia. A claim was made in 1996 that a broadsheet ballad published in the 1880s had similar words; however, the folklorist and researcher John Moulden found no basis to this claim, and Pete St. John stated that he wrote the words as well as the music.

In 1979, the song was recorded by Danny Doyle, reaching the top ten in the Irish Singles Chart. The song charted again in 1982 for Barleycorn, reaching number seven in Ireland, but the most successful version was released by Paddy Reilly in 1982. While peaking only at number four, it remained in the Irish charts for 72 weeks. Two further versions have since reached the Irish top ten: the Cox Crew getting to number five in 1999, while Dance to Tipperary peaked at number six in 2001.

The lyrics say the convict's crime is that he "stole Trevelyan's corn"; this is a reference to Charles Edward Trevelyan, a senior English civil servant in the Dublin Castle administration. Trevelyan famously said, "the judgement of God sent the calamity to teach the Irish a lesson". Commentators differ over whether "Trevelyan's corn" refers to the unpopular maize and cornmeal imported from America by the administration as a relief measure (and in reality nicknamed "[Robert] Peel's brimstone" after the Prime Minister) or the cereal exported by Irish farmers as a cash crop rather than kept to feed the starving.

In 1831, more than a decade before the famine, a visitor to Ireland recorded the anguish of the transported and their families:

"The first sound I heard as I approached the Irish coast, was the accent of distress. As the steamer rounded the harbour of Kingstown, she passed under the stern of a convict ship moored near the shore; on the opposite rocks were seated some women miserably attired, with infants in their arms, and in a state of grief and wretchedness: one of them shouted in Irish to the ship, from the bars of which was heard the voice of a man in reply. The prisoners on board were rioters, who, having been sentenced to transportation, were thus taking their last farewell of their desolate families".

== Sporting anthem ==
The song was regularly sung in the late 1980s by supporters of the Galway county hurling team, and was adopted by Republic of Ireland football supporters during the 1990 World Cup.

It subsequently became popular with supporters of Scottish football club Celtic in the early 1990s. Celtic, based in Glasgow, has a large following in Ireland and among Scottish people of Irish descent. During the Great Famine in Ireland during the 1840s, 100,000 Irish famine victims emigrated to Glasgow. When Celtic's long-serving Irish goalkeeper Pat Bonner had a testimonial match in 1991, he invited Pete St. John to attend the event and speak to the crowd before the game. St John began by thanking Glasgow for looking after the famine victims, and then began to sing "The Fields of Athenry", accompanied by thousands of fans. He later described it as one of the most memorable moments of his life..

Loyalists bands in Northern Ireland and supporters of Scottish football club Rangers play and sing a version of the song called "Fathers Advice" which uses the same tune but set to completely different lyrics of their own.

The song's popularity, due in part to its use at sporting events, has helped to attract tourists to Athenry. In recognition of this, the town's officials invited Pete St. John to a civic reception and presented him with a mace and chain as a token of their appreciation.

The song is also associated with the Connacht, Munster, London Irish and Ireland rugby union teams. It is also seen by many as Galway's county song, sung at GAA matches when the county is playing.

Fans of Cork City F.C. adopted "The Fields of Bishopstown" to the same tune, with lyrics changed from the original version. It is sung regularly at home games. "The Fields of Anfield Road" was adopted by Liverpool supporters to the same tune, but with adapted lyrics referencing their history and stadium. The song was used to commemorate the 20th anniversary of the 1989 Hillsborough disaster. Persija Jakarta's supporters, The Jak Mania also use this song as their chants with the title "Field of GBK" and different lyrics in Indonesian.

At the 2008 Olympic light-heavyweight boxing final, which featured Irish boxer Kenny Egan, Tom Humphries of The Irish Times noted, "By the time Egan and Zhang emerged the great rhythmic roars of "Zhang! Zhang! Zhang!" competed to drown out the lusty warblings of a large Irish contingent who returned to singing of the problems of social isolation in rural Athenry."

During the UEFA Euro 2012 group stage game against Spain, the Irish fans started singing the song roughly 83 minutes into the game and sang for the last six minutes of normal time, as well as past the full-time whistle, knowing that they were going to be eliminated from the group. Some commentators stopped commenting for the final minutes, so the crowd could be heard. This was widely reported in the international media.

== Recordings ==
Other artists to have recorded versions include Foster & Allen, Mary Duff, Máiréad Carlin, Paddy Reilly, Daniel O'Donnell, Frank Patterson, Ronan Tynan, Brush Shiels, James Galway, The Dubliners, Charlie Haden with daughter Petra Haden, Seanchai & The Unity Squad, Scottish band North Sea Gas, English folk singer Felix Slander, English band Kelda with vocalist Jack Routledge, US group Shilelagh Law, US punk band No Use for a Name, New Zealanders Hollie Smith and Steve McDonald, Dropkick Murphys, London-Irish band Neck, The Durutti Column, The High Kings, The Irish Tenors, Off Kilter and Kieran Moriarty. It was also recorded by Serbian bands Orthodox Celts and Tir na n'Og, and US Celtic/folk band Scythian. In 2013, it was released by Neil Byrne and Ryan Kelly of Celtic Thunder for their album Acoustically Irish.

A reggae version of this song was recorded by the Century Steel Band in the early 1980s. Irish-Londoners, Neck, released a "Psycho-Ceilidh" version of the song as a single in support of the Republic of Ireland national football team during the 2002 FIFA World Cup.

Dropkick Murphys recorded two versions of the song. The first, an uptempo rock arrangement, appeared on their 2003 album Blackout. The second was a softer version they recorded specially for the family of Sergeant Andrew Farrar, a United States Marine killed in Fallujah, Iraq. Farrar was a fan of Dropkick Murphys, and requested that their version of the song be played at his funeral if he were to die in combat.

Blaggards blended the song with Johnny Cash's "Folsom Prison Blues" in a medley called Prison Love Songs. Other punk versions of the song have been recorded by the bands No Use for a Name, The Tossers, and the Broken O'Briens. The Greenland Whalefishers, a Celtic-punk band from Norway, also recorded a version on their Streets Of Salvation CD. The song was also recorded by Canadian Celtic rock band the Mudmen on their album Another Day released in 2010. In 2003, Cape Town-based Tom Purcell recorded an a cappella version.

Johnny Logan covered the song on his album, The Irish Connection (2007).

The song appears on the 2012 Bob Brolly album Till We Meet Again.

Welsh folk singer Dafydd Iwan used the tune for his song "Esgair Llyn", a lament on the depopulation of rural Wales. He first recorded it in 1991 and continues to perform it in concert.

The song has been translated to Scottish Gaelic, entitled "Raointean Ath an Rìgh," and was sung by the Scottish singer Iain "Costello" MacIver, from the Isle of Lewis in the Outer Hebrides.

== In film ==
The song is sung in the movie Veronica Guerin, by Brian O'Donnell, then aged 11, a street singer in Dublin, although it is credited on the soundtrack as "Bad News". It is also sung a cappella by a female character at a wake in the 1994 film Priest. It also appears in Dead Poets Society, as a bagpiper plays it by a lake, an anachronism, as the film is set in 1959, before the song was written, and 16 Years of Alcohol. An a cappella version of the first verse and chorus can be found during a singing contest judged by Janeane Garofalo in the film The Matchmaker. Cancer Boy, a character in the 1996 film Kids in the Hall: Brain Candy, is briefly shown whistling the tune.

== See also ==
- Irish rebel music
- List of Irish ballads
- Other rugby anthems:
  - Flower of Scotland
  - Ireland's Call
  - Swing Low, Sweet Chariot (sung by England fans)
  - Cwm Rhondda (Bread of Heaven) sung by Wales fans.
- List of best-selling singles by country
