= Soul Revolution (Forever Storm album) =

Studio album by Forever Storm
- Released: 2009
- Genre: Heavy metal Power metal
- Length: 46:39
- Label: One Records

Professional ratings
Review scores
Source	Rating
Serbian-metal.org	(favorable)

Forever Storm is the debut studio album by Serbian heavy metal band Forever Storm, released in 2009.

The album cover designed by comic book artist Bane Kerac.

== Track listing ==
1. "Gunslinger" - 4:29
2. "It Rains" - 3:58
3. "Battle Cry" - 5:49
4. "Soul Revolution" - 5:49
5. "Trace in Eternity" - 4:47
6. "Storm - 4:56
7. "Once Again" - 5:31
8. "The Outcast" - 4:04
9. "Who I Am" - 3:49
10. "For You" [bonus track] - 4:41

== Personnel ==
- Stefan Kovačević - vocals, guitar
- Miloš Miletić - guitar
- Vladimir Nestrorović - bass guitar
- Vuk Stefanović - drums
- Nikola Marić - keyboards

== Production ==
- Ivan Ilić - mixing, producer
- Dobrica Andrić - engineer, mastering engineer
