= Samo najbolje =

Compilation album by Griva
- Released: September 2002
- Recorded: 1983–1992
- Genre: Hard rock; glam metal; folk rock
- Length: 38:14
- Label: One Records

Griva chronology
| Pij, jedi, veseli se... (1992) | Samo najbolje (2002) | Vojvodino, Vojvodino, što si tako ravna (2010) |

Professional ratings
Review scores
| Source | Rating |
|---|---|
| Rock Express | 4/10 stars |

Samo najbolje (trans. Only the Best) is a compilation album by Serbian and Yugoslav hard rock band Griva, released in 2002.

Released ten years after the release of the band's last album, Pij, jedi, veseli se... (Drink, Eat, Be Merry...), Samo najbolje features the songs from Griva's five studio albums, as well as previously unreleased song "Gde sam to pogrešio" ("Where Did I Go Wrong"). Following the release of the album, the band reunited for an unplugged concert in their home city Novi Sad, the concert featuring most of the band's former members.

== Track listing ==
| No. | Title | Length |
|---|---|---|
| 1. | "Gde sam to pogrešio" ("Where Did I Go Wrong") | 3:20 |
| 2. | "Svega će biti, al' nas nikad više" ("There Will Be Everything, Except Us Ever Again") | 4:37 |
| 3. | "Vojvodino, Vojvodino, što si tako ravna" ("Vojvodina, Vojvodina, Why Are You So Flat") | 3:40 |
| 4. | "Istanbul" | 2:47 |
| 5. | "Februar je mesec u znaku mačora" ("February Is the Month in the Sign of Cat") | 3:52 |
| 6. | "Devojka biserne kose" ("The Girl With Pearly Hair") | 5:03 |
| 7. | "I noćas ću ti doći" ("I'll Come to You Tonight as Well") | 4:00 |
| 8. | "Što te tata pušta samu?" ("Why Does Your Daddy Let You Go Out Alone?") | 2:43 |
| 9. | "Nekad sam mogao 3X na dan" ("I Used to Be Able to Do It Three Times a Day") | 3:35 |
| 10. | "Il' me ljubi il' me ubi" ("Either Kiss Me or Kill Me") | 3:28 |
| 11. | "Ja još imam snage" ("I Still Have the Strength") | 3:28 |
| 12. | "Ti u Sarajevu ja u Novom Sadu" ("You in Sarajevo, Me in Novi Sad") | 2:59 |
| 13. | "Nađi sebi drugu ludu" ("Find Yourself Another Fool") | 2:59 |
| 14. | "Nije mi ništa samo malo strepim" ("I'm Alright, I'm Just a Little Concerned") | 3:17 |
| 15. | "Kad dođe jutro" ("When the Morning Comes") | 4:02 |
| 16. | "Saznala bi kad bi htela" ("You Could Find Out If You Wanted") | 4:38 |
| 17. | "Srećan ti rođendan" ("Happy Birthday to You") | 3:01 |
| 18. | "Da li znaš ovu pesmu?" ("Do You Know This Song?") | 2:29 |
