= Muzika =

Muzika means music in Slavonic languages. It may refer to:

== People ==
- František Muzika (1900–1974), Czech avant-garde painter and artist
- Yuri Muzika (born 1980), Azerbaijani footballer

== Film ==
- Music (2008 film) or Muzika, a Slovak film

== See also ==
- Muzika Poludelih, a Serbian punk band
- Muzika na struju, a studio album from Serbian rock band Bajaga i Instruktori
- Mutato Muzika, an American music production company
- Narodna muzika, folk music in the South Slavic languages
- Starogradska muzika, an urban traditional folk music of eastern Europe
