= Tir na n'Og (album) =

Studio album by Tir na n'Og
- Released: 2006
- Recorded: Focus Studio, Belgrade; 2005/2006
- Genre: Irish folk; Celtic rock
- Length: 41:31
- Label: One Records
- Producer: Tir na n'Og

Tir na n'Og chronology
Tir na n'Og (2006)	Alfapop (2010)

Professional ratings
Review scores
Source	Rating
Popboks	4/10 stars

Tir na n'Og is the debut album by the Serbian Irish folk/Celtic rock band Tir na n'Og released in 2006. It was the band's only Irish folk/Celtic rock-oriented album, as in 2008 they changed their name to Alfapop and moved towards power pop.

== Track listing ==
The Celts Strike Again track listing
No.	Title	Lyrics	Music	Length
1.	"Danny Boy"	Traditional	Traditional	03:12
2.	"Put" ("The Road")	Jovan Dragumilo	Jovana Vujnović	04:39
3.	"River"	Jovan Dragumilo	Jovan Dragumilo	03:37
4.	"Brodovi" ("Ships")	Jovan Dragumilo	Jovan Dragumilo	04:24
5.	"Fields of Athenry"	Traditional	Traditional	03:36
6.	"Spancil Hill"	Traditional	Traditional	03:54
7.	"Stvoriću svet" ("I'll Create a World")	Jovan Dragumilo	Jovan Dragumilo	03:42
8.	"Guarana"	Jovan Dragumilo, Jovana Vujnović	Jovan Dragumilo, Jovana Vujnović	04:28
9.	"Foggy Dew"	Traditional	Traditional	05:43
10.	"Tir na n'Og"	Traditional	Traditional	04:23

== Personnel ==
- Jovana Vujnović - vocals
- Jovan Dragumilo - guitar
- Miroslav Kočić - violin
- Ranko Radovanov - bass guitar
- Miloš Jokić - drums

=== Additional personnel ===
- Srđan Tanasković - keyboards (on tracks: 4, 9)
- Srđan Grujičić - acoustic guitar (on track 6)
- Mladen Miloradović - cello (on track 8)
