= Griva (album) =

Studio album by Griva
- Released: 1987
- Recorded: 1986
- Studios: Barbaro Studio, Bukovac; Radio Novi Sad Studios
- Genres: Hard rock; glam metal; folk rock
- Length: 41:17
- Label: Jugodisk
- Producers: Zlatko Karavla; Karolj Kovač (track 4); Ivica Vlatković (track 6)

Griva chronology
Nisi ni ti anđeo (1985)	Griva (1987)	Što te tata pušta samu (1988)

Griva, also known as Vojvodino, Vojvodino, što si tako ravna (trans. Vojvodina, Vojvodina, Why Are You So Flat) after its biggest hit, is the self-titled third studio album by Serbian and Yugoslav hard rock band Griva, released in 1987.

== Background ==
Griva's second album, Nisi ni ti anđeo (You're Not an Angel as Well), was originally refused by several major Yugoslav record labels as noncommercial, and was eventually released through an independent label, Panonija Koncert. The album was not as successful as Griva's debut album, and after promotional concerts in Yugoslavia and a short Austrian tour, Griva ended their activity.

In 1986, Griva frontman Zlatko Karavla, with a number of musicians, including former Griva members Josip Sabo (guitar), Đorđe Jovanović (bass guitar) and Laslo Novak (keyboards), recorded new material, which was on the insistence of his record label Jugodisk released as Griva's third album. The album, entitled simply Griva, was released in 1987. The new album brought glam metal-oriented songs with elements of folk music of Vojvodina. The album featured a Serbo-Croatian language cover of the hit song "Gyöngyhajú lány" by Hungarian band Omega, Griva version entitled "Devojka biserne kose" ("The Girl With Pearly Hair").

== Album cover ==
Griva album cover featured fluorescent print of the band's logo, and was the first cover of a kind on the Yugoslav rock scene.

== Track listing ==
All songs written by Zlatko Karavla, except where noted

No.	Title	Lyrics	Music	Length
1.	"Vojvodino, Vojvodino, što si tako ravna" ("Vojvodina, Vojvodina, Why Are You So Flat")			3:35
2.	"Februar je mesec u znaku mačora" ("February Is the Month in the Sign of Cat")			3:55
3.	"Kad me ostaviš i zaboraviš" ("When You Leave Me and Forget Me")			2:50
4.	"Devojka biserne kose" ("The Girl With Pearly Hair")	Laslo Novak	Gábor Presser	5:00
5.	"Istanbul"	Josip Sabo	Josip Sabo	2:55
6.	"I noćas ću ti noći" ("I'll Come to You Tonight as Well")			4:00
7.	"Još mislim na nju" ("I Still Think About Her")			3:25
8.	"Mi vas volimo" ("We Love You")			3:05
9.	"Sam protiv svih" ("Alone Against the World")			3:28

== Credits ==
- Zlatko Karavla - vocals, producer
- Josip Sabo - guitar, backing vocals
- Zoran Bulatović - guitar, bass guitar, backing vocals (track 6)
- Đorđe Jovanović - bass guitar (track 4)
- Nasko Budimlić - drums
- Predrag Janičić - drums (on track 6)
- Laslo Novak - keyboards (tracks: 4, 5, 10), backing vocals (track 6)
- Saša Lokner - keyboards
- Ivan Sabo - cello (track 9)
- Brothers Sabo Tamburitza Orchestra (track 1)
- Karolj Kovač - producer (track 4)
- Ivica Vlatković - producer (track 6)
- Jan Šaš - recorded by
- Milan Ćirić - recorded by
- Branislav Petković - design
- Slobodan Antić - photography

== Reception and legacy ==
The album was, unlike its predecessor, a commercial success. After its release, Karavala reformed Griva in the new lineup, featuring two of the musicians who took part in the album recording, guitarist Zoran "Bale" Bulatović and drummer Predrag "Buca" Janičić.

The ballad "Još uvek mislim na nju" from the album was later covered by Hungarian musician Tamás Takáts and achieved large success in his home country.

In 2021, the song "Februar je mesec u znaku mačora" was ranked 99th on the list of 100 Greatest Yugoslav Hard & Heavy Anthems by web magazine Balkanrock.
