= New Tomorrow (album) =

Studio album by Irish Stew of Sindidun
- Released: October 6, 2011
- Recorded: Studio Underground, Belgrade; August 2010 - August 2011
- Genre: Irish folk Celtic rock
- Label: One Records
- Producer: Marko Jovanović

Irish Stew of Sindidun chronology
Dare to Dream (2008)	New Tomorrow (2011)

Singles from So Many Words...
- 1. "Lady of New Tomorrow" Released: August 2011

Professional ratings
Review scores
Source	Rating
Nocturne	7.5/10 stars
RockKultur.net	4.5/5 stars

New Tomorrow is the third studio album by the Serbian Irish folk/Celtic rock band Irish Stew of Sindidun, released in 2011.

The album was released on October 6, available both on CD, released by One Records, and in a form of multimedia application, available for free download from the band's official website.

== Track listing ==
Lyrics and music written by Bojan Petrović.

1. "From Ashes to the 7th Sky" - 2:24
2. "Lady of New Tomorrow" - 3:23
3. "Dream Shelf" - 2:27
4. "When Day Is Over - 4:14
5. "Home Is Where Your Heart Is" - 3:10
6. "Take Me High" - 4:05
7. "No Surrender" - 2:46
8. "Prison" - 4:04
9. "One Way Ticket" - 3:17
10. "So in Love – 3:02
11. "One for the Road" - 2:37
12. "Heather" - 4:52

== Personnel ==
- Bojan Petrović - lead vocals, tin whistles, arranged by
- Nenad Gavrilov - acoustic guitar, backing vocals
- Ivan Ðurić - banjo, electric guitar, backing vocals
- Ana Milanović - violin
- Aleksandar Gospodinov - bass
- Marko Jovanović – drums

=== Guest musicians ===
- Nikola Stanojević – violin
- Vladan Jovković – acoustic guitar
- Stefan Gaćeša – electric guitar, recorded by

=== Additional personnel ===
- Marko Jovanović– producer, arranged by, recorded by, backing vocals
- Vladimir Đekić – recorded by
- Dušan Filimonović – recording assistant
- Nemanja Filipović – audio editing
- Dragana Kuprešanin – graphic design
- Ciara Norton – cover art
- Igor Čvoro – booklet photography
- Ivan Najman - multimedia application development
