= So Many Words... =

Studio album by Irish Stew of Sindidun
- Released: October 31, 2005
- Recorded: 2005
- Genre: Irish folk Celtic punk
- Length: 44:22
- Label: One Records

Irish Stew of Sindidun chronology
So Many Words... (2005)	Dare to Dream (2008)

Singles from So Many Words...
- 1. "Puzzle of Life"; 2. "Why"

Professional ratings
Review scores
Source	Rating
Barikada	5/10 stars

So Many Words... is the debut album for the Serbian Irish folk/Celtic rock band Irish Stew of Sindidun, released in 2005.

Having won the audience reward on Demo Masters Tournament organized by radio Belgrade 202 and an award of the Demo Maraton in 2004 organized by the Belgrade Youth Center, the band entered the studio and recorded their debut album. So Many Words.... was released on October 31, 2005 through One Records, and beside the band's own songs included cover versions of three traditional Irish folk songs. Promotional videos were recorded for the tracks "Puzzle of Life" and "Why".

== Track listing ==
Lyrics and music by Bojan Petrović except where noted.

1. "McGee's Daughter" (Bojan Petrović, Dušan Radić) - 02:33
2. "Why" - 03:22
3. "Puzzle of Life" - 03:54
4. "Patrick Malone" (Boris Rakas, Bojan Petrović, Nikola Nikoletić) - 02:00
5. "Last Bottle of Sadness" - 04:08
6. "The Stew" (Irish Stew of Sindidun) - 03:04
7. "Running from The Destiny" - 04:34
8. "Stout" (Bojan Petrović, Nikola Nikoletić) - 03:17
9. "Rare Moments" - 04:31
10. "Black and Tans" (Dominic Behan, arranged by Bojan Petrović) - 03:32
11. "Skibbereen" (Traditional, arranged by Bojan Petrović) - 04:47
12. "Back Home in Derry" (Bobby Sands, arranged by Bojan Petrović) - 04:31

== Personnel ==
- Bojan Petrović - lead vocals, tin whistles
- Nenad Gavrilov - acoustic guitar, backing vocals
- Ivan Ðurić - banjo, electric guitar, backing vocals
- Ana Mrkobrada - violin
- Aleksandar Gospodinov - bass guitar, backing vocals
- Pavle Medan - drums
