= Skibbereen (song) =

Irish folk song

"Skibbereen" (Roud 2312), also known as "Dear Old Skibbereen", "Farewell to Skibbereen", or "Revenge For Skibbereen", is a traditional Irish folk song. It takes the form of a dialogue wherein a father tells his son about the Irish famine, being evicted from their home in Skibbereen, and the need to flee as a result of the Young Ireland rebellion of 1848.

== History ==
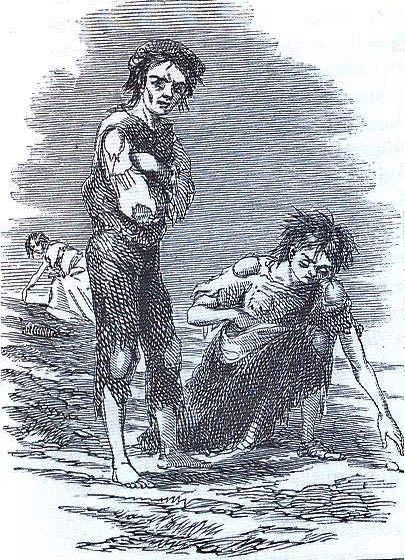
Skibbereen 1847 by Cork artist James Mahony (1810–1879), commissioned by Illustrated London News 1847.

The song traces back from at least 1869, in The Wearing Of The Green Songbook, where it was sung with the melody of the music "The Wearing of the Green", and not with the more melancholic melody we know today. Another early publication of the song was in a 19th-century publication, The Irish Singer's Own Book (Noonan, Boston, 1880). In both of those early sources, the song is attributed to Patrick Carpenter, a poet native of Skibbereen. It was published in 1915 by Herbert Hughes who wrote that it had been collected in County Tyrone, and that it was a traditional ballad of the famine. It was recorded by John Lomax from Irish immigrants on Beaver Island, Michigan in the 1930s.

The son in the song asks his father why he left the village of Skibbereen, in County Cork, Ireland, to live in another country, to which the father tells him of the hardship he faced in his homeland. It ends on a vengeful note expressed by the son.

== Lyrics ==
The lyrics as they appear in Hughes' Irish Country Songs (1909) are as follows:

"O father dear, I oft-times hear you talk of Erin's Isle,
Her lofty scenes and valleys green, her mountains rude and wild.
They say it is a pretty place wherein a prince might dwell.
And why did you abandon it, the reason to me tell."

"My son, I loved our native land with energy and pride,
Until a blight came on my land, my sheep and cattle died.
The rent and taxes were to pay, I could not them redeem,
And that's the cruel reason why I left old Skibbereen.

"Oh it's well I do remember that bleak December day,
The landlord and the sheriff came to drive us all away.
They set my roof on fire with their demon yellow spleen,
And that's another reason why I left old Skibbereen.

"Your mother too, (God rest her soul) lay on the snowy ground.
She fainted o'er in anguish with the desolation round.
She never rose, but passed away from life to immortal dream,
And found a quiet grave, my boy, in dear old Skibbereen.

"And you were only two years old and feeble was your frame.
I could not leave you with your friends, you bore your father's name.
I wrapped you in my cóta mór at the dark of night unseen.
I heaved a sigh and bid goodbye to dear old Skibbereen.

"It's well I do remember the year of forty eight,
When I arose with Erin's boys to battle against the fate.
I was hunted thro' the mountains like a traitor to the Queen,
And that's another reason why I left old Skibbereen."

"O father dear, the day will come when vengeance loud will call,
And we will rise with Erin's boys to rally one and all.
I'll be the man to lead the van beneath our flag of green,
And loud and high will raise the cry 'Revenge for Skibbereen.'"

== Recordings ==
The song has been performed live and recorded by The Dubliners, Wolfe Tones and Sinéad O'Connor as well as by many other contemporary Irish artists. In the film Michael Collins the Collins character, played by Liam Neeson, sings the song. It makes an appearance in the Victoria television series.

Artist	Album	Year of release
The Wolfe Tones	Rifles of the I.R.A.	1969
The Dubliners	Plain and Simple	1973
Four to the Bar	Another Son	1995
Irish Stew of Sindidun	So Many Words...	2005
