= Dare to Dream (Irish Stew of Sindidun album) =

Dare To Dream

Studio album by Irish Stew of Sindidun
- Released: March 17, 2008
- Genre: Irish folk Celtic punk
- Length: 47:28
- Label: One Records

Irish Stew of Sindidun chronology
So Many Words... (2005)	Dare To Dream (2008)	New Tomorrow (2011)

Singles from Dare To Dream
- 1. "Ditch" Released: March 3, 2009

Dare To Dream is the second studio album by the Serbian Irish folk/Celtic rock band Irish Stew of Sindidun, released on Saint Patrick's Day in 2008.

Having finished promoting their first album, the band started writing new material which was released in 2008. Dare To Dream featured ten original songs and cover versions of two traditional Irish folk songs. A promotional video was recorded for the song "Ditch" in March 2009.

The Celtic punk fan site shitenonions.com ranked the album the fifth best release of 2008.

== Track listing ==
Lyrics and music written by Bojan Petrović except where noted.

1. "Blessed And Damned" – 03:45
2. "Ditch" – 03:37
3. "Life Without Living On A Sunny Winter Day" – 04:46
4. "I Will Never (Be Your Friend)" – 05:06
5. "Memories" – 04:00
6. "Whiskey And Miles Behind" – 04:36
7. "The Sailor's Song" (Nenad Gavrilov, Bojan Petrović) – 03:28
8. "Pile Of Sins" – 03:40
9. "Weila, Waila" (Traditional, arranged by Irish Stew of Sindidun) – 03:11
10. "Carrickfergus" (Traditional, arranged by Irish Stew of Sindidun) – 04:29
11. "Farewell" – 04:05
12. "Sweet Long Stick" (Irish Stew of Sindidun) – 02:43

== Personnel ==
- Bojan Petrović – lead vocals, tin whistles
- Nenad Gavrilov – acoustic guitar, backing vocals
- Ivan Ðurić – banjo, electric guitar, backing vocals
- Ana Mrkobrada – violin
- Aleksandar Gospodinov – bass guitar, backing vocals
- Marko Krasnić – drums
