= Nisi ni ti anđeo =

Studio album by Griva
- Released: 1985
- Recorded: 1984
- Studio: Meta Sound Studio
- Genre: Hard rock; heavy metal
- Length: 41:17
- Label: Panonija Koncert
- Producer: Karolj Kovač

Griva chronology
Kog sam đavola tražio u tebi (1983)	Nisi ni ti anđeo (1985)	Griva (1987)

Nisi ni ti anđeo (trans. You're Not an Angel as Well) is the second studio album by Serbian and Yugoslav hard rock band Griva, released in 1985.

== Background ==
After the release of their debut album Kog sam đavola tražio u tebi (What the Hell I Saw in You) in 1983, Griva recorded the material for their second album, produced, as their previous album, by Karolj Kovač. Despite the success of the band's debut, the material for the second album was refused by several major Yugoslav record labels and noncommercial, so the band released the album through independent record label Panonija Koncert. It featured a cover of Joan Jett's version of the song "I Love Rock 'n' Roll", Griva version titled "I Law Myroslaw" (the title referring to folk music singer Miroslav Ilić) and ridiculing Yugoslav "newly-composed folk music".

== Track listing ==
All songs written by Zlatko Karavla and Josip Sabo, except where noted

No.	Title	Lyrics	Music	Length
1.	"I Law Myroslaw"	Đorđe Jovanović	Alan Merrill; Jake Hooker	3:01
2.	"Ti i ja" ("You and Me")			3:34
3.	"Nije mi ništa, samo malo strepim" ("I'm Alright, I'm Just a Little Concerned")			3:34
4.	"Lake žene i loše vino" ("Easy Women and Bad Wine")			2:54
5.	"Ne treba mi doktor" ("I Don't Need No Doctor")			3:22
6.	"Nisi ni ti anđeo" ("You're Not an Angel as Well")	Đorđe Jovanović	Griva, Tamás Barta	2:55
7.	"Imaš 14 tek" ("You're Only 14")			2:42
8.	"Sve je to Rock 'n' Roll" ("It's All Rock 'n' Roll")			3:20
9.	"Nemoj mi se smejati u lice" ("Don't Laugh In My Face")			3:55

== Personnel ==
- Zlatko Karavla - vocals
- Josip Sabo - guitar
- Đorđe Jovanović - bass guitar
- Laslo Novak - keyboards
- Janoš Kazimić - drums

=== Additional personnel ===
- Karolj Kovač - producer
- Milan Berar - recorded by
