= Dargoron =

Serbian metal band

- Origin: Smederevo, Serbia
- Genres: Power metal Progressive metal
- Years active: 2002–2011
- Labels: Active Time Records, One Records
- Past members: Nikola Janković; Zlatko Nikolić; Marko Cakić; Darko Lazarević; Aleksandar Jelenić
- Website: www.dargoron.com

Dargoron (Serbian Cyrillic: Даргорон) was a Serbian power/progressive metal band.

== History ==
Dargoron was formed in 2002 by Nikola Janković (vocals), Zlatko Nikolić (guitar), Aleksandar Jelenić (bass guitar) and Darko Lazarević (drums). They had their first performance at the Open Air festival in Smederevo on August 9, 2002. In November 2002 Marko Cakić, former member of Kvantni Skok, replaced Aleksandar Jelenić on bass guitar. At the time Janković stopped playing rhythm guitar and has focused on singing.

In January 2005, after the break due to some members' military service, the band recorded songs for their first album at the Paradox studio in Smederevo (owned by Alogia members). The album was released on June 20, 2006, through Active Time label, only after they've won the Radio Beograd 202 Demo Masters competition, where they were awarded album publishing. After the album release the band performed at the 40th Gitarijada.

Recording and production of the material that was released on the band's second album were completed by the middle of 2007. Raskršće snova (Crossroads of Dreams) was released in 2008. Track "Duša ratnika" was recorded with guest vocalists Lotke (Kraljevski Apartman) and Marko Raco Max (Nightfall).

In 2011, the band ended their activity.

== Discography ==
=== Studio albums ===
- Dargoron (2006)
- Raskršće snova (2008)
