= Što te tata pušta samu =

Studio album by Griva
- Released: 1988
- Recorded: 1988
- Studio: Studio Barbaro, Bukovac
- Genre: Hard rock; glam metal; folk rock
- Length: 33:35
- Label: PGP-RTB
- Producer: Milan Berar

Griva chronology
Griva (1987)	Što te tata pušta samu (1988)	Pij, jedi, veseli se... (1992)

Što te tata pušta samu (trans. Why Does Your Daddy Let You Go Out Alone) is the fourth studio album by Serbian and Yugoslav hard rock band Griva, released in 1988.

== Background ==
Griva's third studio release, their 1987 self-titled album, was recorded after original incarnation of the band split-up in 1986 by the band's frontman Zlatko Karavla and studio musicians. On the insistence of Karavla's record label Jugodisk, the material was released as Griva's third album, achieving commercial success with its glam metal-oriented songs with elements of folk music of Vojvodina. After the album release, Karavla reformed Griva, the new lineup signing contract with major record label PGP-RTB and recording the band's fourth studio album.

The album featured three songs written by Bijelo Dugme vocalist Alen Islamović, with whom Karavla in 1986 recorded the protest song "Kaljinka" ("Kalinka"), inspired by the Chernobyl disaster. The recording featured guest appearances by Bajaga i Instruktori keyboardist Saša Lokner, Ekatarina Velika drummer Ivan Fece "Firchie" and Mitar Subotić, the latter programming E-mu Emulator.

== Track listing ==
No.	Title	Lyrics	Music	Length
1.	"Što te tata pušta samu" ("Why Does Your Daddy Let You Go Out Alone")	Zlatko Karavla	Zlatko Karavla	2:44
2.	"Ti u Sarajevu, ja u Novom Sadu" ("You in Sarajevo, Me in Novi Sad")	Zlatko Karavla	Zlatko Karavla	2:42
3.	"Il' me ljubi il' me ubi" ("Either Kiss Me or Kill Me")	Zlatko Karavla	Zlatko Karavla	3:30
4.	"Ostani još malo" ("Stay a Little Longer")	Zlatko Karavla	Zlatko Karavla	3:13
5.	"Ja još imam snage" ("I Still Have the Strength")	Alen Islamović	Alen Islamović	4:35
6.	"Nađi sebi drugu ludu" ("Find Yourself Another Fool")	Zlatko Karavla	Zlatko Karavla	2:56
7.	"Nekad sam mogao triput na dan" ("I Used to Be Able to Do It Three Times a Day")	Zlatko Karavla	Zlatko Karavla	3:37
8.	"Ranjavaš me, čergašice" ("You're Wounding Me, Gypsy Girl")	Alen Islamović	Alen Islamović	3:05
9.	"Nije mi ništa, samo malo strepim" ("I'm Alright, I'm Just a Little Concerned")	Zlatko Karavla	Zlatko Karavla	3:19
10.	"Moja sele" ("My Little Sister")	Alen Islamović	Alen Islamović	3:24

== Personnel ==
- Zlatko Karavla - vocals, arrangements
- Zoran Maletić - guitar, backing vocals
- Vojislav Vilić - guitar, backing vocals
- Momčilo Bajac - bass guitar, acoustic guitar, backing vocals
- Predrag Janičić - drums

=== Additional personnel ===
- Saša Lokner - keyboards
- Mitar Subotić - Emulator II
- Ivan Fece - drums (track 9)
- Josip Sabo - backing vocals
- Milan Berar - producer
- Milan Ćirić - recorded by
- Ivica Vlatković - recorded by (track 9)
- Zorica Lakić - design
- Atanas Mlazev - photography

== Reception ==
The album brought the hits "Ti u Sarajevu, ja u Novom Sadu" ("You in Sarajevo, Me in Novi Sad") and "Nekad sam mogao triput na dan" ("I Used to Be Able to Do It Three Times a Day"). In May 1988, Griva performed at the international rock festival in Budapest, and after returning to Yugoslavia, they held a large promotional concert in Spens Sports Center in Novi Sad with Osmi Putnik, Viktorija and Alen Islamović appearing on the concert as guests. It was followed by Griva's last Yugoslav tour, the group ending their activity at the beginning of 1990.
