= Pij, jedi, veseli se... =

Studio album by Griva
- Released: 1992
- Recorded: January 1991–March 1992
- Genre: Hard rock; glam metal; folk rock
- Length: 28:41
- Label: Megaton
- Producer: Zlatko Karavla

Griva chronology
| Što te tata pušta samu (1988) | Pij, jedi, veseli se... (1992) | Samo najbolje (2002) |

Professional ratings
Review scores
| Source | Rating |
|---|---|
| Branimir Lokner - Kritičko pakovanje | (unfavorable) |

Pij, jedi, veseli se... (trans. Drink, Eat, Be Merry...) is the fifth and the last studio album by Serbian and Yugoslav hard rock band Griva. At the time of the album release, the band has been inactive for two years. Recorded by the band's former frontman Zlatko Karavla with former Griva members and other musicians, the album was released under Griva moniker in 1992.

== Background ==
After the release of their fourth studio album Što te tata pušta samu (Why Does Your Daddy Let You Go Out Alone) in 1988, Griva went on their last Yugoslav tour, ending their activity at the beginning of 1990. After Griva disbanded, Karavla dedicated himself to work in studio and writing songs for Serbian folk singers. In 1991, he started recording the studio album Pij, jedi, veseli se..., the recording of which, due to the outbreak of Yugoslav wars, lasted for more than year and a half, with former Griva members and other musicians taking part in the recording process. Karavla released the material under the Griva moniker in 1992 for the independent label Megaton.

== Album cover ==
The album cover features Zlatko Karavla. The vinyl record cover featured the same design as the audio cassette j-card, with the label and Griva logo and songs titles taking up the left side of the vinyl record cover.

== Track listing ==
All tracks are written by Zlatko Karavla

| No. | Title | Length |
|---|---|---|
| 1. | "Da li znaš ovu pesmu?" ("Do You Know This Song?") | 2:32 |
| 2. | "Srećan ti rođendnan" ("Happy Birthday to You") | 3:20 |
| 3. | "Kad dođe jutro" ("When the Morning Comes") | 4:10 |
| 4. | "Poljubi me malo niže" ("Kiss Me a Little Lower") | 2:42 |
| 5. | "Pij, jedi, veseli se..." ("Drink, Eat, Be Merry") | 2:46 |
| 6. | "Kaljinka" ("Kalinka") | 3:10 |
| 7. | "Saznala bi kad bi htela" ("You Could Find Out If You Wanted") | 4:40 |
| 8. | "Dođi sebi dok još imaš kome" ("Come to Your Senses While You Still Can") | 2:40 |
| 9. | "Samo nebo da ne padne" ("I Only Hope the Sky Won't Fall") | 2:52 |

== Credits ==
- Zlatko Karavla - vocals, producer
- Miroslav Maletić - guitar, drums
- Momčilo Bajac - guitar, bass guitar, acoustic guitar
- Siniša Cvetković - bass guitar, keyboards
- Zoran Mraković - guitar (solo on track 4)
- Bane Micić - keyboards (on track 8), bass guitar (on track 8)
- Josip Sabo - backing vocals
- Žana Povše - backing vocals (on track 5)
- Jan Šaš - mixed by
- Rajko Ignjatić - mixed by
- Ljubomir Pejić - recorded by
- Saša Pavlović - recorded by
