= Alfapop =

Serbian power pop band

- Also known as: Tir na n'Og
- Origin: Belgrade, Serbia
- Genres: Irish folk; Celtic rock; power pop
- Years active: 2000 – 2011
- Labels: One Records, AMAdea Records
- Past members: Jovana Vujnović; Jovan Dragumilo; Ranko Radovanov; Miroslav Kočić; Damir Žigić

Alfapop (Serbian Cyrillic: Алфапоп, transliteration for: Alphapop) was a Serbian power pop band. The band was formed in Belgrade in 2000 under the name Tir na n'Og. Initially, the band performed Irish folk and Celtic rock and was a prominent act of the Serbian Celtic rock scene, releasing one Celtic rock-oriented album. In 2008, the band changed the name to Alfapop and turned towards power pop sound, releasing their second album in 2010 and disbanding soon after the album release.

== Band history ==
=== Tir na n'Og (2000–2008) ===
The band was formed in 2000 by a group of Irish music enthusiasts and was named Tir na n'Og after Tír na nÓg, the land of eternal youth in Irish mythology. At first mostly playing Irish folk and songs by The Pogues and Young Dubliners, they gained audience's attention. Having changed a number of members the band got a stable lineup featuring Jovana Vujnović (vocals), Jovan Dragumilo (guitar and vocals), Miroslav Kočić (violin), Damir Žigić (drums) and Ranko Radovanov (bass guitar).

The band started recording their debut self-titled album in the autumn of 2005. The album was released in 2006 through One Records. The album featured songs both in English and Serbian language, with elements of punk rock and both Irish and Serbian folk music. Three promotional videos were recorded, for the tracks "Brodovi", "Danny Boy" and "River".

=== Alfapop (2008–2011) ===
In 2008, the band, now consisting of Vujnović, Dragumilo and Radovanov only, changed the name to Alfapop and turned towards power pop, continuing, however, to perform songs they recorded as Tir na n'Og. In 2008, the band took part in the action entitled "Zdrav život - moj stil" ("Healthy Life - My Style") initiated by the Serbian Ministry of Youth and Sports, performing with other bands across Serbia. In 2010, the band released the album Alfapop through Bulgarian record label AMAdea Records. The album featured nine songs in Serbian language, and the electronic music song "Fantasy", recorded by Vujnović, as the bonus track. Promotional videos were recorded for the songs "Sati" ("Hours") and "Hoću još" ("I Want More"). The song "Kao prvi put" ("Like the First Time") is a duet recorded with Lazar Drecun, vocalist of the band Charlie B.

Soon after Alfapop release, Dragumilo stated that the band is planning to record a live album. However, although Alfapop never officially announced their disbandment, nothing was heard from them since 2011.

== Discography ==
=== as Tir na n'Og ===
- Tir na n'Og (2006)

=== as Alfapop ===
- Alfapop (2010)

== See also ==
- Orthodox Celts
- Irish Stew of Sindidun
