= Tragedy (Forever Storm album) =

Album by Forever Storm

Studio album by Forever Storm
- Released: 2013
- Recorded: Audio Design Studio
- Genre: Heavy metal Power metal
- Length: 62:39
- Label: EBM Records
- Producer: Ivan Ilic

Professional ratings
Review scores
Source	Rating
Serbian-metal.org	(favorable)

Tragedy is the second studio album by Serbian heavy metal band Forever Storm, released in December 2013 by EBM Records from Mexico.

== Track listing ==
1. "Inceptum Finis" - 1:43
2. "Mother" - 4:57
3. "Made of Lies" - 4:57
4. "Forever the Same" - 4:57
5. "Tragedy" - 5:14
6. "Nocturnal Wings" - 5:22
7. "Carry on the Flame" - 5:16
8. "Paradox" - 4:26
9. "City of Vultures" - 4:36
10. "Flames of Reason" - 4:51
11. "Death Comes Alive" - 5:11
12. "Euthanasia For Mankind" - 5:59
13. "The Leaving" [bonus track] - 4:38

== Personnel ==
- Stefan Kovačević - vocals, guitar
- Miloš Miletić - guitar
- Vladimir Nestrorović - bass guitar
- Vuk Stefanović - drums
- Nikola Marić, Stefan Kovačević, Vladimir Nestrorović - keyboards
- Milica Vasović, Dušan Bozinovski - Additional orchestration

== Production ==
- Ivan Ilić - mixing, producer
- Dobrica Andrić - engineer
- Joey Sturgis - mastering engineer
