= Forever Storm =

Serbian heavy metal

- Origin: Kragujevac, Serbia
- Genres: Heavy metal, Thrash metal, Power metal
- Years active: 2006 – present
- Labels: One Records, EBM Records
- Members: Stefan Kovačević; Miloš Miletić; Vladimir Nestorović; Vuk Stefanović
- Past members: Nikola Marić
- Website: https://foreverstorm.net/

Forever Storm is a Serbian heavy metal band from Kragujevac.

== History ==
Forever Storm was formed at the end of 2006 by Miloš Miletić (guitar), Stefan Kovačević (guitar, vocals) and Vladimir Nestorović (bass guitar). Before finding a drummer, the band recorded several demos using rhythm machine. At the beginning of 2007, they were joined by Vuk Stefanović (drums). During the same year the band competed on the 41st Gitarijada festival, also performing on the Exit festival. At the end of 2007, the band started recording their debut studio album. In 2008, the band won the first place at the Crvenka competition of rock bands.

=== Soul Revolution ===
Their debut album, entitled Soul Revolution, was released at the end of 2009 through One Records, featuring a cover designed by comic book artist Bane Kerac. Recording sessions for the album took place in Kragujevac between November 2008 and June 2009. The band collaborated closely with producer Ivan Ilić to shape the sonic direction of the record, while Dobrica Andrić was responsible for audio engineering and final mastering, ensuring high production quality and tonal consistency throughout the album.

In 2010, keyboardist Nikola Marić, who participated in the recording of Soul Revolution, joined the band. During the same year, the band performed on the Wacken Open Air W.E.T. stage. Forever Storm participated in a live TV show called "Rat Bendova" on Bosnian international television, OBN, with their appearance on the show leading to a regional tour. In July 2012. the band entered and won a contest as part of Avala Rock Fest. The album Soul Revolution was named Album of the Year by a prominent Serbian metal portal.

=== Tragedy ===
Once again, in 2012. the band returned to a familiar creative setting, recording in the same studio with the trusted production team. Ivan Ilić reprised his role as producer, while Dobrica Andrić handled both engineering and mastering, maintaining the continuity and technical integrity of the band’s sound.. During the recording of their second album, Nikola Maric left the band. The album Tragedy, was released in December 2013 by EBM Records from Mexico City. In its first few years, the album was one of the best-selling foreign releases issued by the label.

During the promotional cycle for Tragedy, the band embarked on an extensive regional tour, performing in all major cities across Serbia and solidifying their presence on the domestic metal scene. They also maintained a strong connection with audiences in Sofia, Bulgaria, where they appeared regularly, as well as throughout Bosnia and Herzegovina, where the band built a growing fanbase. Additional performances in Montenegro and North Macedonia further expanded their reach within the Balkan region.

Their increasing popularity culminated in an appearance at the Underwall Festival in Zadar, at the time one of the most prominent metal festivals in Croatia, marking a significant milestone in the band’s live career and regional recognition.

=== Od Pepela do Vecnosti ===
In early 2017, the band returned to studio work and began developing their first-ever concept album. Released in 2023, From Ashes to Eternity is the band’s most ambitious project to date — a concept album exploring the tragedy and heroism of the Great War.

Recorded over nearly seven years at Blacksmith Studio in Kragujevac, the album reflects a deeply personal vision. The band stated: “We wanted to repay our ancestors through music and lyrics, and make their feat immortal in this way.” The lengthy production process was significantly affected by the COVID-19 pandemic, which slowed down recording and overall progress. In contrast to the band’s first two albums, From Ashes to Eternity was recorded entirely in the Serbian language, marking a notable shift in the band’s artistic approach. The album was also self-released, representing a further step in the band’s independent direction.

Production for the album was handled entirely by the band’s guitarist and vocalist, Stefan Kovacevic. The album also features several guest musicians: Nenad Jankovic contributed piano on the track “Lament”; Vojislav Spasic performed choral parts for “Povratak”; and Isidora Filipovic played cello on “Na Pragu Ledenog Pakla.” These collaborations added additional layers of depth and orchestration to the album’s epic and emotional sound.

Upon release, the album was named Album of the Year by Serbian Metal Portal, marking the band’s second major recognition by the outlet. In support of the album, Forever Storm performed at several notable events, including Arsenal Fest and Ludi Rakun in Kragujevac, as well as Rokerijada in Petrovac na Mlavi.

== Other Projects ==
Members of Forever Storm have been involved in several additional musical projects while remaining active in the band.

Stefan Kovacevic played in the Kragujevac band ALEK from 2007 to 2015. He later founded the project Stefan – Nemanja with Nemanja Savic of the band Atlantinda, recording two studio albums.

Milos Miletic played drums for The Evil One, contributing to and producing their 2016 album Murder Roll At The Lovers Lane, released digitally through Serbian Metal Portal.

Vuk Stefanovic was a member of For My Cold Dead Hands, recording the album Undying, and also played in Black Crown Empire, contributing to the album My Name Is War. Additionally, he is an active member of the punk rock band Zvoncekova Biljeznica.

== Discography ==
=== Studio albums ===
Title	Released
Soul Revolution	2009
Tragedy	2013
Od Pepela do Vecnosti	2023
