= Griva =

Serbian rock band

- The last Griva lineup, from left to right: Vojislav Vilić, Zlatko Karavla, Momčilo Bajac, Zoran Maletić and Predrag Janičić

Background information
- Origin: Novi Sad, Serbia, Yugoslavia
- Genres: Hard rock; heavy metal; glam metal; folk rock
- Years active: 1982–1990; 2002
- Labels: Jugoton, Panonija koncert, Jugodisk, PGP-RTB, Megaton, One
- Past members: Zlatko Karavla; Josip Sabo; Zoran Gogić; Đorđe Jovanović; Laslo Novak; Janoš Kazimić; Laslo Pihler; Nikola Džunja; Zoran Bulatović; Predrag Janičić; Vojislav Vilić; Momčilo Bajac; Zoran Maletić
- Website: www.zlatkogriva.com

Griva (Serbian Cyrillic: Грива; trans. Mane) was a Yugoslav hard rock band formed in Novi Sad in 1982.

The band was formed by two former members of the band Ibn Tup, guitarist Josip Sabo and drummer Zlatko Karavla. After the band's original vocalist, Zoran Gogić, left the group soon after its formation, Karavla switched to the position of the band's frontman. Griva released their debut album in 1983. Their second studio album saw little commercial success, and the group split up soon after its release. The band's third release, the 1987 self-titled album, was recorded by Karavla with a number of studio musicians and released as Griva's third album on the insistence of the record label. It proved to be a large commercial success with its folk-influenced glam metal sound, which led Karavla to reform Griva after album release. The band released one more studio album before disbanding in 1990, at the wake of Yugoslav Wars. The group's last official album was recorded by Karavla and released two years after the disbandment of the group. In 2002, the band reunited for an unplugged performance in Novi Sad, the recording of which was released as live and video album.

== Band history ==
=== The beginnings: Ibn Tup (1973–1979) ===
The band's beginnings can be tracked back to 1973, when Josip Sabo (guitar), Zlatko Karavla (drums), and Dušan Bečelić (bass guitar) started the band Ibn Tup. They chose the name for the band after a popular comic book character. Initially, the band played covers of songs by Deep Purple, Led Zeppelin and Black Sabbath, performing across Vojvodina. After Bečelić left the band in 1974 to serve his mandatory stint in the Yugoslav army, Ibn Tup was joined by Olah Vince (guitar, bass guitar, violin, vocals) and Rade Milošević "Kinez" (keyboards), changing their musical direction towards folk music-influenced funk. The band's manager Milan Opsenica occasionally performed with the band playing rhythm guitar and bass guitar and would later become the band's permanent member, playing percussion.

In 1977, the group released their debut record, the 7-inch single with the songs "Pašidov el Kaktus" ("Pashid's El Cactus") and "Deda" ("Grandpa"), through PGP-RTB record label. Their frequent live appearances and the newly-released single provided them with an opportunity to perform on the prominent Youth Festival in Subotica. During the following period, the band performed on the seventh edition of the BOOM Festival, and as an opening act for several popular Yugoslav bands – they performed as the opening band for Time on their concert in Belgrade's Pinki Hall, for Bijelo Dugme on their famous Hajdučka česma concert, and for Begnagrad in Novi Sad's Studio M. In the spring of 1978, they performed as the opening act for Buldožer on their two-month tour across Yugoslavia. Later during the year, they released the 7-inch single with the songs "Njen tata" ("Her Dad") and "Događaj u Balkan ekspresu" ("An Event in Balkan Express"), through Jugoton, and the EP Da li bi mi dala? (Would You Give to Me?), through Diskos. The EP was recorded with new members, bass guitarist Aleksandar Milošević and vocalist Zoran Gogić. At the beginning of 1979, Vince and Milošević left the band to serve their mandatory army stints, and the group was joined by keyboardist Zoran "Cokla" Stojšin. The new lineup of the band went on a one-month tour with Slađana Milošević, and later on a solo tour across Bosnia and Herzegovina. In November 1979, Sabo and Karavla were drafted into the army, and the group played their farewell concert at the Novi Sad Faculty of Medicine.

=== 1982–1992 ===
In 1982, Karavla and Sabo started the hard rock band Griva with their former Ibn Tup bandmate Zoran Gogić (vocals), Đorđe Jovanović (formerly of the band Viša Sila, bass guitar) and Laslo Novak (formerly of Sani, keyboards). The band was initially named Bela Griva (White Mane), after a children's book by French author René Guillot, but the members soon decided to shorten the name to Griva. After only several rehearsals, Gogić left the band, so Karavla took over vocal duties, and the new drummer became Janoš Kazimić (formerly of Rock Spin). Griva had their first live appearance as the opening act on Buldožer concert held in Novi Sad's Firemen's Hall. Soon after, Griva, as a support act, went on Vojvodina tour with Divlje Jagode.

The band recorded the material for their debut album in January 1983, offering it to major Yugoslav labels, all of the companies refusing them with the explanation that their music is off trend. However, the band managed to achieve commercial success with their debut single, a heavy metal cover of the song "Sitnije, Cile, sitnije" ("Lightly, Cile, Lightly") by folk singer Lepa Brena, Griva's version entitled "Sitnije, sestro, sitnije" ("Lightly, Sister, Lightly"), released in 1983. The 7-inch single with the songs "Sitnije, sestro, sitnije" and "Tebi je važna samo lova" ("All You Care About Is Money") was given as a present with the 751st issue of the comic book magazine Stripoteka. The success of the single provided the band with the contract with Yugoslavia's biggest record label, Jugoton. During the same year, Griva released their debut album Kog sam đavola tražio u tebi (What the Hell I Saw in You). The album was produced by the radio host Karolj Kovač, and featured guest appearance by Galija frontman Nenad Milosavljević on harmonica in the song "Ti si lija, ti si zmija" ("You're a Vixen, You're a Snake"). The album was sold in more than 250,000 copies, becoming a gold record, with the title track, "Ti si lija, ti si zmija" and the ballad "Svega će biti, al' nas nikad više" ("There Will Be Everything, Except Us Ever Again") seeing most airplay. Soon after the album release, Griva became a support band on Divlje Jagode tour once again, and on 24 September 1984, they performed as the opening band for Motörhead on their concert in Pionir Hall in Belgrade.

New material, recorded in 1985, was refused by several major Yugoslav record labels as noncommercial. It was released, under the title Nisi ni ti anđeo (You're Not an Angel as Well), through an independent label, Panonija Koncert. It featured a cover of Joan Jett's version of the song "I Love Rock 'n' Roll", Griva version titled "I Law Myroslaw" (the title referring to folk music singer Miroslav Ilić). After the album release, Kazimić left the band, and was replaced by Laslo Pihler, a former member of the punk rock band Pekinška Patka; however, after only several months, Pihler himself was replaced by former Proces member Nikola Džunja. After a short Austrian tour and a performance on the Subotica Youth Festival, Griva ended their activity.

In 1986, Karavla and former Divlje Jagode frontman Alen Islamović recorded the protest song "Kaljinka" ("Kalinka"), inspired by the Chernobyl disaster, which was soon banned in some Yugoslav media, out of fear it might cause protests from the Soviet Embassy. Soon after, Karavla, with various musicians, including former Griva members Sabo, Jovanović and Novak, recorded new material, which was on the insistence of his record label Jugodisk released as Griva's third album. The band's self-titled album, also known as Vojvodino, Vojvodino, što si tako ravna (Vojvodina, Vojvodina, Why Are You so Flat) after its biggest hit, was released in 1987. The new album, considered the band's biggest commercial success, brought glam metal-oriented songs with elements of folk music of Vojvodina. The album featured a Serbo-Croatian language cover of the hit song "Gyöngyhajú lány" by Hungarian band Omega, Griva version entitled "Devojka biserne kose" ("The Girl With Pearly Hair"). The ballad "Još uvek mislim na nju" ("I Still Think of Her") from the album was later covered by Hungarian musician Tamás Takáts and achieved large success in his home country. Griva album cover featured fluorescent print of the band's logo, and was the first cover of a kind on the Yugoslav rock scene.

After the album release, Karavla reformed Griva. The new lineup featured, beside Karavla, guitarist Zoran "Bale" Bulatović (a former member of the post-punk/gothic rock band Luna), guitarist Vojislav Vilić (a former member of the hard rock band Amajlija), bass guitarist Momčilo "Moma" Bajac (a former member of the new wave band Čista Proza) and drummer Predrag "Buca" Janičić (a former member of the new wave band Kontraritam), Bulatović and Janičić previously taking part in Griva recording. In 1988, the band released their fourth studio album, Što te tata pušta samu (Why Does Your Daddy Let You Go Out Alone), through Yugoslavia's second largest label, PGP-RTB. As Bulatović left the band before the album recording, Zoran "Zox" Maletić, a former member of Pekinška Patka, was hired for the recording sessions. The album featured three songs written by Alen Islamović, and featured guest appearances by Bajaga i Instruktori keyboardist Saša Lokner, Ekatarina Velika drummer Ivan Fece "Firchie" and Mitar Subotić, the latter programming E-mu Emulator. The record brought the hits "Ti u Sarajevu, ja u Novom Sadu" ("You in Sarajevo, Me in Novi Sad") and "Nekad sam mogao triput na dan" ("I Used to Be Able to Do It Three Times a Day"). In May 1988, Griva performed at the international rock festival in Budapest, and after returning to Yugoslavia, they held a concert in Spens Sports Center in Novi Sad with Osmi Putnik, Viktorija and Alen Islamović appearing on the concert as guests. The band went on their last Yugoslav tour, ending their activity at the beginning of 1990.

After the group disbanded, Karavla dedicated himself to work in studio and writing songs for Serbian folk singers. In 1991, he started recording the studio album Pij, jedi, veseli se... (Drink, Eat, Be Merry...), the recording of which, due to the outbreak of Yugoslav Wars, lasted for more than year and a half, with former Griva members and other musicians taking part in the recording process. After Karavla finished the recording, he released the material under the Griva moniker in 1992 for the independent label Megaton, the album receiving very little attention of the audience and the media.

=== 2002 reunion ===
In September 2002, One Records released the compilation album Samo najbolje (Only the Best), featuring previously unreleased ballad "Gde sam to pogrešio" ("Where Did I Go Wrong"), and in December of the same year, the band reunited for an unplugged concert in Novi Sad. The concert, held on 18 December 2002 in Novi Sad's Studio M, featured most of the band's former members, accompanied by Novi Sad Music Academy String Quartet and the folk rock group Apsolutno Romantično. The recording of the concert was self-released by the band in 2010 on the live album and the DVD, both entitled Vojvodino, Vojvodino, što si tako ravna.

== Discography ==
=== Studio albums ===
- Kog sam đavola tražio u tebi (1983)
- Nisi ni ti anđeo (1985)
- Griva (1987)
- Što te tata pušta samu (1988)
- Pij, jedi, veseli se... (1992)

=== Live albums ===
- Vojvodino, Vojvodino, što si tako ravna (2010)

=== Compilations ===
- Samo najbolje (2002)

=== Video albums ===
- Vojvodino, Vojvodino, što si tako ravna (2010)
