= Century Steel Band =

Irish reggae band

Century Steel Band was an Irish reggae-band. Its members may have gone separate ways, but they are still making their own music. Drummer Lloyd Johnson now plays with Coventry reggae ska band Cabstars.

The band was formed in 1982 in Ireland. Charley Anderson, (bass player and founding member of the 2-Tone ska band The Selecter) was asked by Pete St. John (writer of The Fields of Athenry) to record a version after hearing it. The Century Steel Band was invited to a 2-week tour of Ireland. This is where they met with Pete St. John. Other band members were from Saint Lucia, Saint Vincent and Antigua.
