= Muzika Poludelih =

Serbian punk band

- Also known as: MP
- Origin: Vrbas, Serbia
- Genres: Hardcore punk, Oi! punk
- Years active: 1997 - present
- Labels: ITMM, One Records, In-N-Out Records, Metacaffe
- Members: Dragan Đakonović; Nemanja Pavkov (Pavlston); Kolja Kovac Mane Gluvajic
- Past members: Bane Poptešin; Miloš Gordić; Bodule; Chikara; Pooyan />Misha Djakonov
- Website: Official website

Muzika Poludelih (Serbian Cyrillic: Музика Полуделих; trans. Madmen Music) is an oi!/hardcore punk band from Vrbas, Serbia.

== History ==
The band was formed in 1997, releasing their debut album Definicija bolesti (The Definition of the Disease) during the same year through the independent record label ITMM. Unlike the debut album, which featured lyrics in Serbian language, their second studio album My Unity, released by One Records in 2003, featured lyrics in English language, which was the case with all of their following releases. Both the debut and the second album featured the guest appearance by the famous Serbian writer and journalist Raša Popov, who recorded spoken word parts on several tracks. Beside the material written by the band, My Unity featured a cover version of the Blitz single "New Age". After the album release, the band went on a promotional tour, which, beside Serbia, included performances in Romania and Hungary.

In 2005, the band released their third studio album Hardcore Force, released under the underground record label New Age Family Organization, which, besides eleven songs, featured five music videos the band had recorded throughout their career as bonus material. The album was listed as one of the albums which marked the year 2005 by the Serbian daily newspaper Blic. After the album release, from March to May 2005, the band went on a Brutal Drunk tour, with the Croatian band Stronghold, comprising ten dates in both Serbia and Croatia. The band also performed as an opening act for the Seattle garage punk band The Intelligence in Zrenjanin. The following year, with the Netherlands band The Shining, the band performed in Bačka Topola, Szentes and Budapest, and on February, with the bands Stronghold and False Reality, the band went on the Brutal Drunk Tour 2, performing in Croatia and Slovenia.

In 2009, the band released their fourth studio album The Beast Is Back, featuring six songs only and available on both compact disc, released by New Age Family records, as well in mp3 format, available for digital download at the official Myspace page. The band announced that The Beast Is Back is musically only an introduction into the upcoming studio album, featuring twice as many songs.

== Discography ==
- Definicija bolesti (1997)
- My Unity (2003)
- Hardcore Force (2005)
- The Beast Is Back (2009)
- Ulice su mrtve (2012)
- Brothers (2013)
- The Pride and the Glory (2015)
