= Markus Kienzl =

Austrian musician, film music composer (b. 1973)

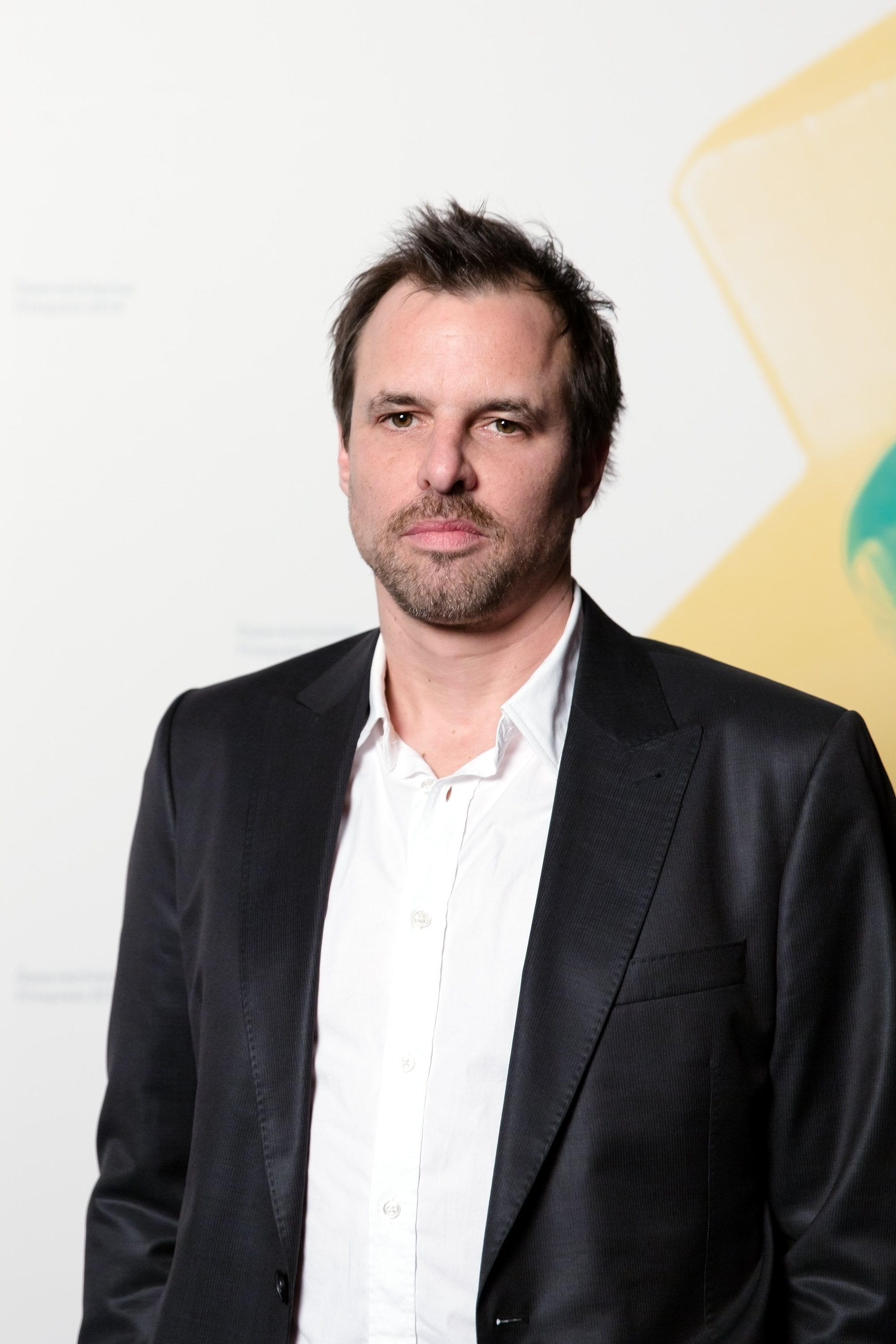
- Markus Kienzl in 2016
- Born: 16 March 1973 (age 53); Mödling, Austria

Markus Kienzl (born 16 March 1973) is an Austrian musician and composer. He lives and works in Vienna. He is best known as a founding member of the Austrian band Sofa Surfers. In 1999, Kienzl released his first solo EP "TILT" on the Vienna label Klein Records. In 2005, his debut album "Product" was released, and the single "Dundy Lion feat Paul St. Hilaire" from that album was licensed as the main title for the Rockstar game Midnight Club: Los Angeles. The following year, Kienzl also produced the music for the film "Dad's Dead" by Christopher Schier and David Schalko. In 2009, he worked as a producer for Tania Saedi's debut album "Exhale" and released his second solo album "Density". In 2010, he received a nomination for the Amadeus Austrian Music Award, his first as a solo artist after three previous nominations with his band Sofa Surfers. His collaboration with Richard Dorfmeister on the Remix "The Stoppa" (Richard Dorfmeister Meets Markus Kienzl Remix) for the Jamaican dancehall singer Cutty Ranks earned him a nomination at the 58th Grammy Awards in 2015 for Best Rap Song, as Drake used a sample from the track in his song "Energy".

Markus Kienzl is a member of the Austrian Film Academy. Together with Wolfgang Frisch, Kienzl was nominated for the Austrian Film Award 2016 in the category of "Best Film Score" for the film "Das ewige Leben". Since 2017, Kienzl has increasingly dedicated himself to his work as a film score composer. From 2017 to 2021, Kienzl produced the soundtracks for four episodes of the crime series "Tatort" commissioned by ORF and Bavarian Broadcasting. Commissioned by ZDF, Kienzl produced the music for the TV-series "Dead End". For Sky, Kienzl produced the music for the miniseries "Die Ibiza Affäre" and the third season of the series "Der Pass". In 2024, he produced the soundtrack for the Arte series "Metrocosmos", using mostly instrumental versions of tracks from his album "THREE," released the same year.

== Discography ==
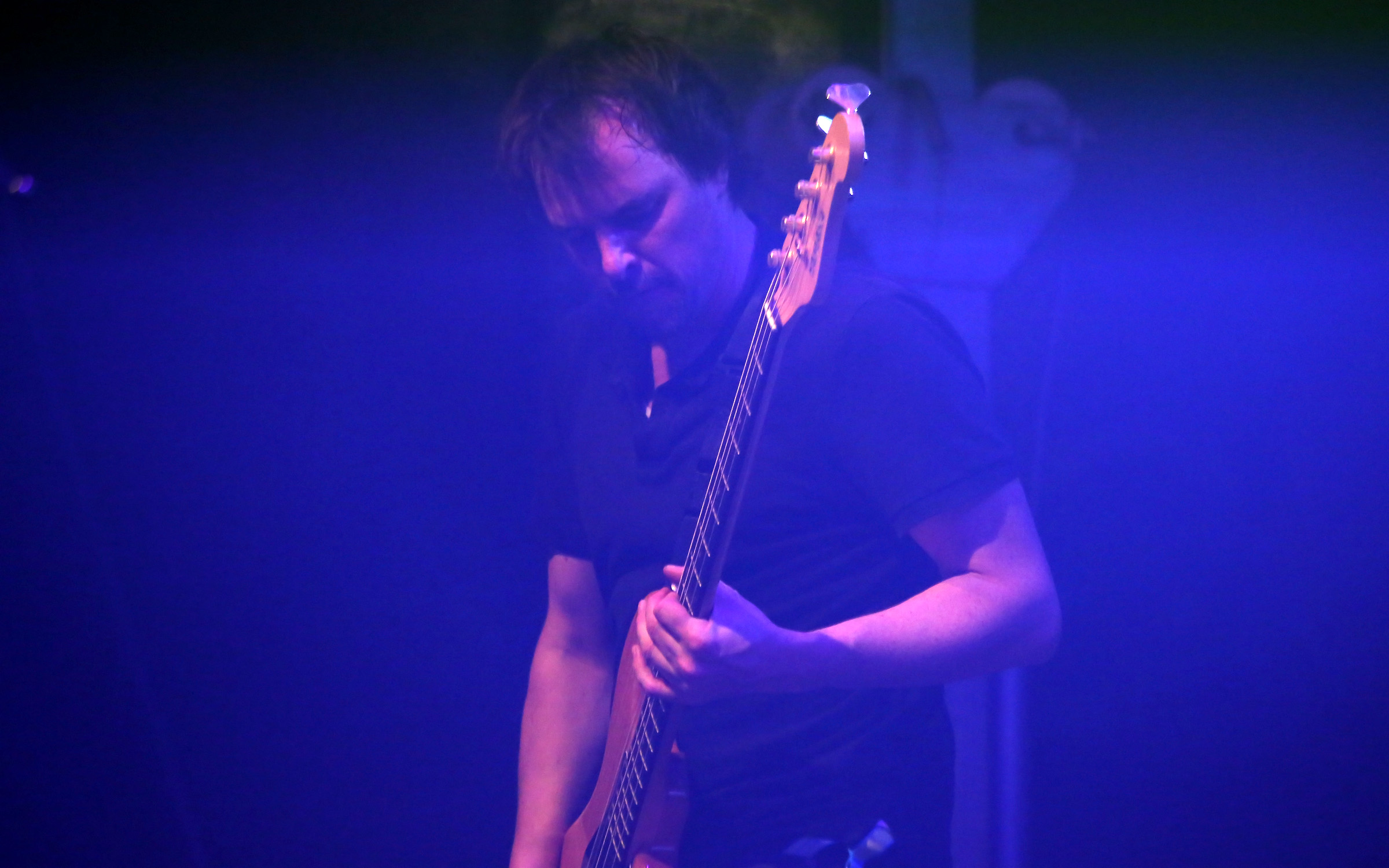
Markus Kienzl at a concert with the Sofa Surfers, 2013

=== Albums ===
- 2005: Product, Klein Records
- 2009: Density, Klein Records
- 2024: THREE, Monoscope Audio

=== EPs ===
- 1999: Tilt EP, Klein Records
- 2001: Sincerely Yours Part Two Of 5 (as "Senior Piccolino"), Klein Records
- 2005: Markus Kienzl On Ear, Olliwood Records, On Ear
- 2014: For God's Sake EP, Fabrique Records

=== Singles ===
- 2005: Dundy Lion, Klein Records
- 2013: Terror, Fabrique Records
- 2014: Well, Fabrique Records

== Filmography (selection) ==
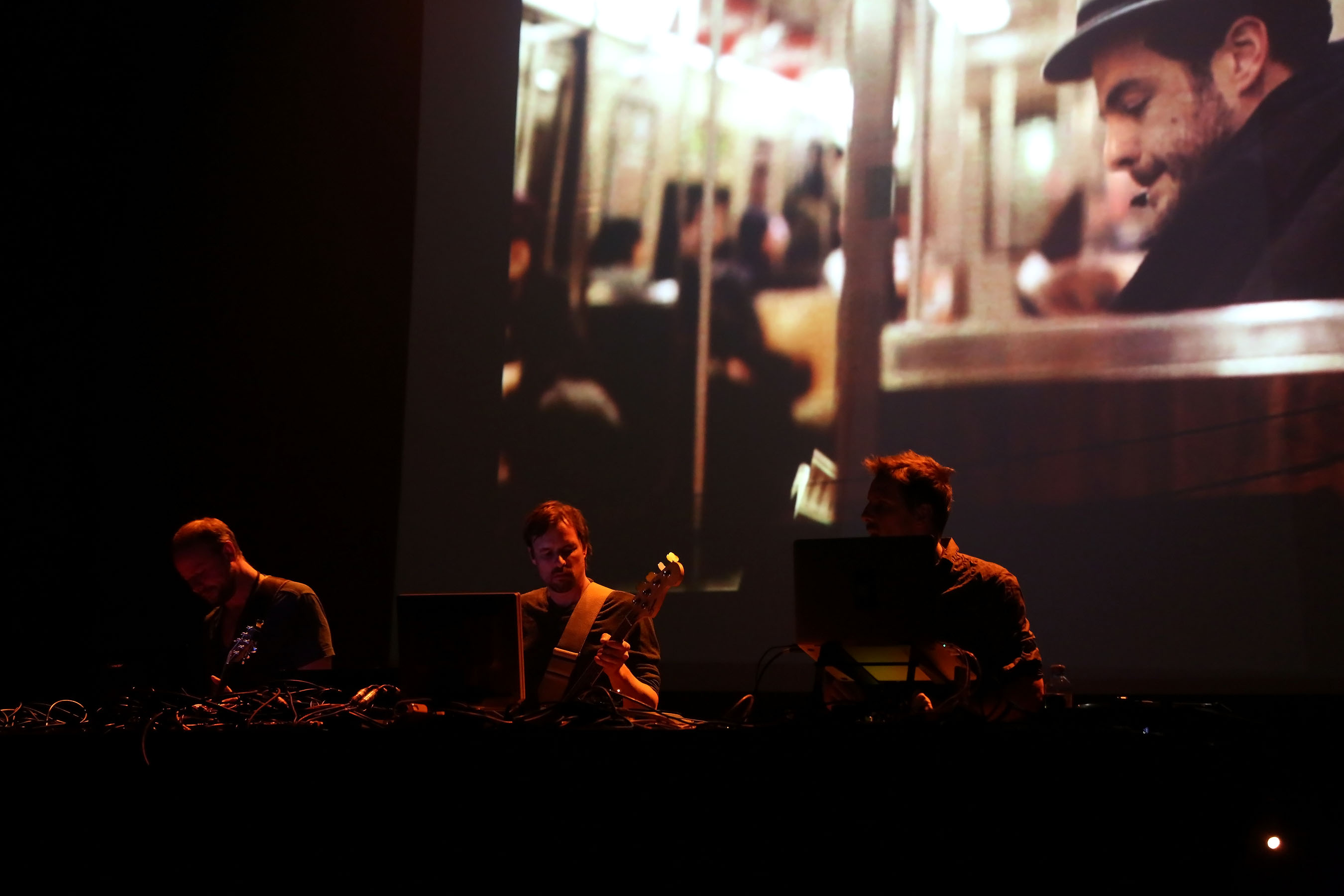
Live performance for Trains of Thoughts with Wolfgang Frisch, Markus Kienzl, and Timo Novotny (2013)

- 1995: Wirehead (short film by Timo Novotny and Norbert Pfaffenbichler
- 1997: Daydream Nation (documentary by Ebba Sinzinger
- 2000: Komm süßer Tod
- 2002: Nogo
- 2003: The Poet
- 2004: Silentium
- 2006: Life in Loops
- 2006: Dad's Dead
- 2009: Der Knochenmann
- 2012: Trains of Thoughts
- 2012: Void
- 2014: Menschen am Sonntag
- 2015: Das Ewige Leben
- 2017: Tatort: Wehrlos (TV series)
- 2018: Tatort: Die Faust (TV series)
- 2019: Dead End (TV series) (6 episodes)
- 2019: Cops (2018)
- 2019: Todesfrist – Nemez und Sneijder ermitteln (TV series)
- 2019: Glück gehabt (TV film)
- 2020: Tatort: Lass den Mond am Himmel stehn (TV series)
- 2021: Tatort: Die Amme (TV series)
- 2021: Die Ibiza Affäre (TV series, a Sky Original)
- 2021: Todesurteil – Nemez und Sneijder ermitteln (TV series)
- 2023: Der Pass (TV series, 8 episodes)
- 2024: Metrokosmos (TV Documentary Series, 5 Episodes)
- 2025: Die Affäre Cum-Ex (Other People’s Money) (TV Series, 8 Episodes)

== Awards and nominations ==
=== Awards ===
Amadeus Austrian Music Award

- Best Album Electronic/Dance 2010 – with Sofa Surfers
- Best Album Alternative 2013 – with Sofa Surfers

Romy

- Best Feature Film 2016 – Das ewige Leben (film) – with Wolfgang Frisch
- Best TV/Streaming Series 2022 – Die Ibiza Affäre
- Best TV/Streaming Series 2023 – Der Pass

=== Nominations ===
Amadeus Austrian Music Award

- Radio FM4 Award 2010 for "Density"

Austrian Film Award

- Best Film Score for "Das Ewige Leben" 2016 – with Wolfgang Frisch
- Best Film Score for "Cops" 2018 – with Wolfgang Frisch

Grammy Awards

- Best Rap Song 2016
