= Kog sam đavola tražio u tebi =

Studio album by Griva
- Released: 1983
- Recorded: April 1983
- Studio: Meta Sound Studio
- Genres: Hard rock; heavy metal
- Length: 30:26
- Label: Jugoton
- Producer: Karolj Kovač

Griva chronology
Kog sam đavola tražio u tebi (1983)	Nisi ni ti anđeo (1985)

Kog sam đavola tražio u tebi (trans. What the Hell I Saw in You) is the first studio album by Serbian and Yugoslav hard rock band Griva, released in 1983.

== Background and recording ==
Formed in 1982, Griva recorded the material for their debut album in January 1983, offering it to major Yugoslav labels, all of the companies refusing them with the explanation that their music is off trend. However, the band managed to achieve commercial success with their debut single, a heavy metal cover of the song "Sitnije, Cile, sitnije" ("Lightly, Cile, Ligthly") by folk singer Lepa Brena, Griva's version entitled "Sitnije, sestro, sitnije" ("Lightly, Sister, Lightly"), released in 1983. The 7-inch single with the songs "Sitnije, sestro, sitnije" and "Tebi je važna samo lova" ("All You Care About Is Money") was given as a present with the 751st issue of the comic book magazine Stripoteka. The success of the single provided the band with the contract with Yugoslavia's biggest record label, Jugoton. In 1983, Griva released their debut album Kog sam đavola tražio u tebi. The album was produced by the radio host Karolj Kovač, and featured guest appearance by Galija frontman Nenad Milosavljević on harmonica in the song "Ti si lija, ti si zmija" ("You're a Vixen, You're a Snake").

== Album cover ==
The album cover, designed by Tasa Tomić, features images of comic characters Vampirella and Conan, the rights to which were obtained from Marvel Comics Group via Yugoslav comic book publisher Forum.

== Track listing ==
All songs written by Zlatko Karavla (lyrics) and Josip Sabo (music), except where noted.

No.	Title	Lyrics	Music	Length
1.	"Sitnije, sestro, sitnije" ("Lightly, Sister, Lightly")	Marina Tucaković	Kornelije Kovač	2:45
2.	"Tebi je važna samo lova" ("All You Care About Is Money")			2:32
3.	"Svi smo mi u stvari u duši mesari!" ("All of Us Are Butchers Deep Down Inside!")			2:58
4.	"Šta je s tobom?" ("What's Wrong With You?")			2:58
5.	"Ti si lija, ti si zmija" ("You're a Vixen, You're a Snake")			3:07
6.	"Rolam" ("I'm Rolling")			2:54
7.	"Kog sam đavola tražio u tebi" ("What the Hell I Saw in You")			3:51
8.	"Lud za tobom" ("Crazy About You")			3:07
9.	"Plači, samo plači" ("Cry, Just You Cry")			3:05
10.	"Svega će biti, al' nas nikad više" ("There Will Be Everything, Except Us Ever Again")			6:48

== Personnel ==
- Zlatko Karavla - vocals
- Josip Sabo - rhythm and lead guitar
- Đorđe Jovanović - bass guitar, artwork (logo)
- Laslo Novak - keyboards
- Janoš Kazimić - drums

=== Additional personnel ===
- Nenad Milosavljević - harmonica (on track 5)
- Karolj Kovač - producer
- Ivica Vlatković - engineer
- Svetozar Pajić - photography
- Toza Tomić - design

== Reception ==
The album sold more than 250,000 copies, becoming a gold record, with the title track, "Ti si lija, ti si zmija" and the ballad "Svega će biti, al' nas nikad više" ("There Will Be Everything, Except Us Ever Again") seeing most airplay. The success of the album provided Griva with an opportunity to perform as a support band on Divlje Jagode's tour and as the opening band for Motörhead on their concert held on 24 September 1984 in Pionir Hall in Belgrade.
