= History of Liverpool F.C. (1985–present) =

History of an English football club

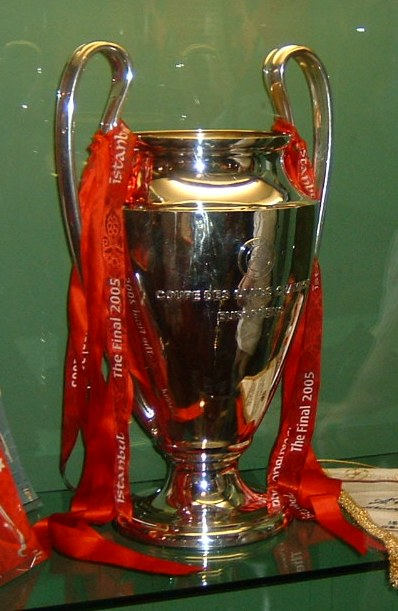
The European Champion Clubs' Cup trophy, won by Liverpool for the fifth time in 2005

The history of Liverpool Football Club from 1985 to the present day covers the appointment of Kenny Dalglish as manager, the Hillsborough disaster, and the club's return to European competition in 1991. Throughout this period, the club played in the top tier of English football, which in 1992 became the Premier League.

Dalglish was appointed as player-manager after Joe Fagan resigned following the 1985 Heysel Stadium disaster, which resulted in Liverpool's indefinite ban from European competition. Liverpool won a league and FA Cup double in Dalglish's first season, and won a further league title in 1987–88. The Hillsborough disaster, which occurred during an FA Cup semi-final against Nottingham Forest at Hillsborough Stadium in April 1989, resulted in the deaths of 97 of the club's supporters. After the disaster, Dalglish led the club to their eighteenth title in 1989–90; he resigned in February 1991. The Taylor Report into the Hillsborough disaster recommended the end of standing terraces; to comply with its findings, Anfield was converted to an all-seater stadium during the early 1990s, which greatly reduced its capacity. Dalglish's successor Graeme Souness won the FA Cup in his first full season. In the newly formed Premier League, he struggled to sustain the club's domestic successes and was replaced by Roy Evans midway through 1993–94. Liverpool improved to fourth the following season and won the League Cup.

In 1998, Gérard Houllier was appointed co-manager alongside Evans. The arrangement lasted until November when Evans resigned and Houllier became the sole manager. The club won a unique treble of trophies in 2001, and a year later finished second to Arsenal, their highest league finish in 11 years. Houllier departed the club in mid-2004. Liverpool won the UEFA Champions League for the fifth time in Rafael Benítez's debut season, and he guided the club to a further FA Cup success in 2006. Midway through the 2006–07 season, the club was bought by Americans Tom Hicks and George Gillett. At the start of the 2010–11 season, Liverpool were on the verge of bankruptcy; the club was sold to New England Sports Ventures following a high court ruling. Roy Hodgson, who took over from Benítez, left the club in 2011; Dalglish was again placed in charge of team affairs and won the 2012 League Cup, Liverpool's eighth win in the competition.

Dalglish was replaced by Brendan Rodgers after the team finished eighth in the 2011–12 Premier League. Rodgers guided Liverpool to second in 2013–14, but board disagreements over transfers and poor team performances led to his sacking in October 2015. His replacement, Jürgen Klopp, led the club to a resurgence in form as they appeared in consecutive Champions League finals, winning the latter in 2019 to earn a sixth European Cup ending a seven-year trophy drought. The following season, he guided the team to the 2019–20 Premier League title, the club's first league title in 30 years and the first under the Premier League format. Klopp left Liverpool in 2024, and his successor Arne Slot won the 2024–25 Premier League before being dismissed the following year.

== 1985–90: Success at a cost ==
Dalglish became manager following the resignation of Fagan after the Heysel Stadium disaster. He started by replacing long-serving full-backs Phil Neal and Alan Kennedy with Steve Nicol and Jim Beglin. Liverpool began the 1985–86 season poorly and were ten points behind Manchester United at the end of September. The club continued to struggle until the end of the season when they won eleven of their last twelve matches, as their rivals were dropping points. Liverpool needed to beat Chelsea in the last game of the season to win the league championship. A goal from Dalglish secured the championship. The club also progressed to the 1986 FA Cup Final, where they faced Everton. Liverpool went behind to a first-half goal from Gary Lineker, but two goals from Ian Rush and a Craig Johnston goal in the second half secured a 3–1 victory. The club had achieved a double of league championship and FA Cup in the same season for the first time.

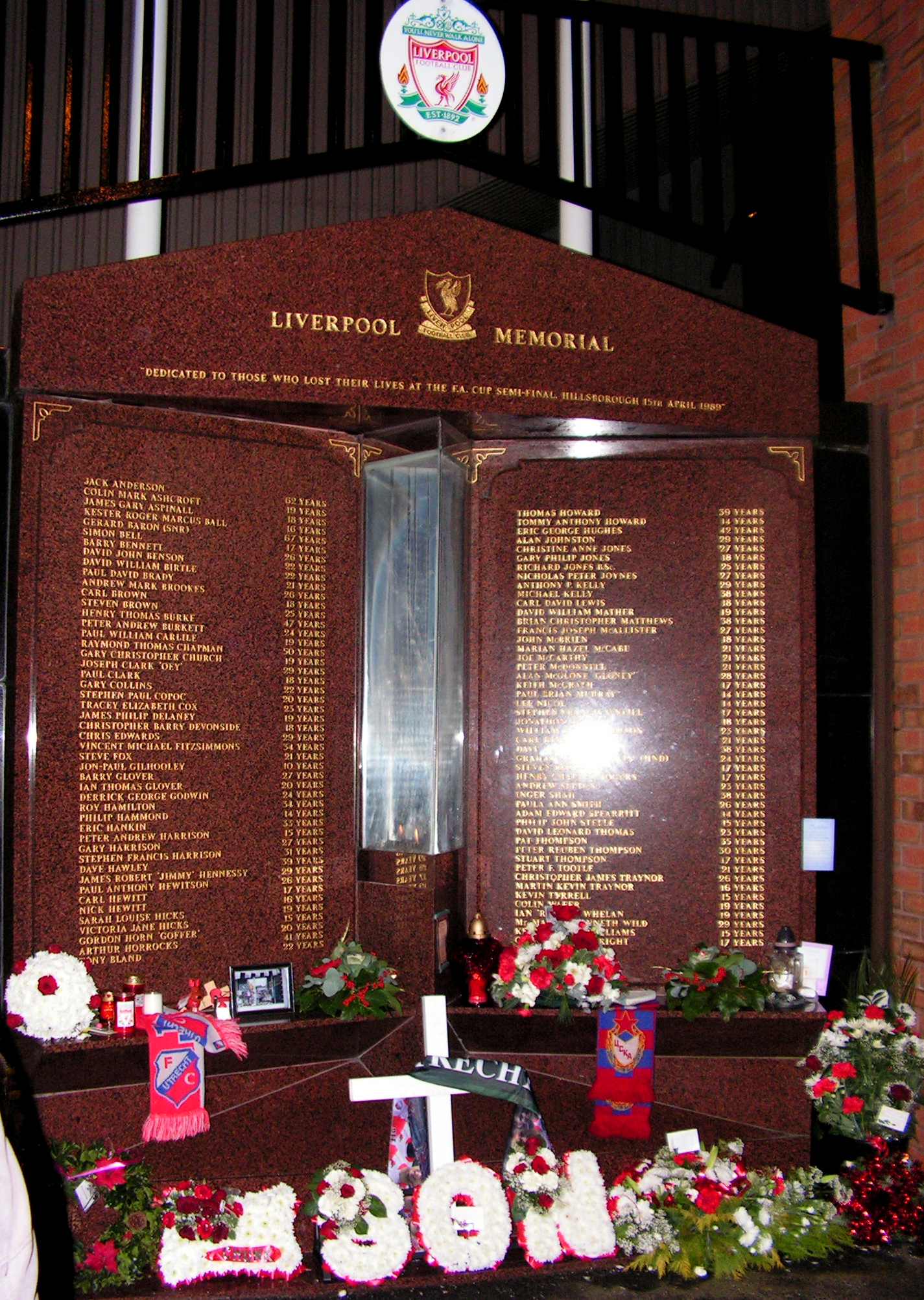
The Hillsborough memorial, which is engraved with the names of the 97 people who died in the Hillsborough disaster

At the start of the 1986–87 season, Rush announced his intention to leave Liverpool for Italian team Juventus when the season was finished. Rush did not want to leave but the club decided to sell him, as they were short of money due to their expulsion from European competition. Midway through the season, Dalglish signed John Aldridge to replace Rush when he left. Prior to his departure, Rush scored 40 goals. Liverpool finished second in the league behind Everton, and were knocked out of the FA Cup in the third round by Luton Town. The club did reach the 1987 Football League Cup Final, but they were beaten 2–1 by Arsenal. At the end of the season, Dalglish signed Peter Beardsley and John Barnes to improve their attack. Liverpool regained the league championship; they did not suffer defeat until their 29th match against Everton, one of two losses during the season. The club had the chance to complete the double, as they reached the final of the FA Cup against Wimbledon. Although favourites against a club who had become a member of the Football League only eleven years previously, they lost the match 1–0.

Rush returned to Liverpool for the start of the 1988–89 season, due to homesickness. Liverpool struggled at the start of the season and by January they were nine points behind leaders Arsenal; by April the teams were level on points, and Arsenal were ahead on goal difference. By this time, Liverpool had reached the semi-finals of the FA Cup against Nottingham Forest at Hillsborough stadium on 15 April 1989. Within six minutes the match was abandoned; overcrowding at the Leppings Lane end of the ground resulted in the death of ninety-seven people, as they were crushed against perimeter fencing. Ninety-four fans died, in what became known as the Hillsborough disaster, that day; the 95th victim died in hospital from his injuries four days later; the 96th died nearly four years later, without regaining consciousness; the final 97th victim died in 2021. Liverpool won the replay 3–1 to reach the final against Everton. They led for the majority of the match from an Aldridge goal. Everton's Stuart McCall scored in the 89th minute to take the game into extra time. Substitute Rush scored in the 95th minute, but McCall scored again in the 102nd minute to level the match. Another goal from Rush two minutes later secured a 3–2 victory for Liverpool. Once again, Liverpool had a chance at the double. Their final match of the season was against second-placed Arsenal, who were three points behind. The game had originally been scheduled for 23 April, but Liverpool's FA Cup commitments meant it was postponed and rearranged for 26 May. Arsenal needed to win the match by two clear goals to win the league championship. They took the lead in the 52nd minute when striker Alan Smith scored. With the match in injury time, Michael Thomas scored to give Arsenal a 2–0 victory. The result meant Arsenal won the championship on goals scored.

After the season, an inquiry headed by Lord Taylor was set up to establish the causes of the Hillsborough disaster. The subsequent Taylor Report, published in 1990, found that failure of police control was the main reason for the disaster and recommended that major stadiums remove terracing and become all-seater venues. Liverpool started the 1989–90 season in good form, exemplified by a 9–0 victory over newly promoted Crystal Palace. Eight different players scored for the club, the only time this has occurred in English football. In October and November they lost four games, but they recovered to go unbeaten until a 1–0 loss to Tottenham Hotspur in March. Following the match, Liverpool signed forward Ronny Rosenthal on loan from Standard Liège. His impact was immediate; he scored seven goals in eight appearances, including a hat-trick against Charlton Athletic to help Liverpool to their eighteenth league championship. The club progressed to the semi-finals of the FA Cup, but they lost 4–3 to Crystal Palace after extra time.

== 1990–98: Decline ==
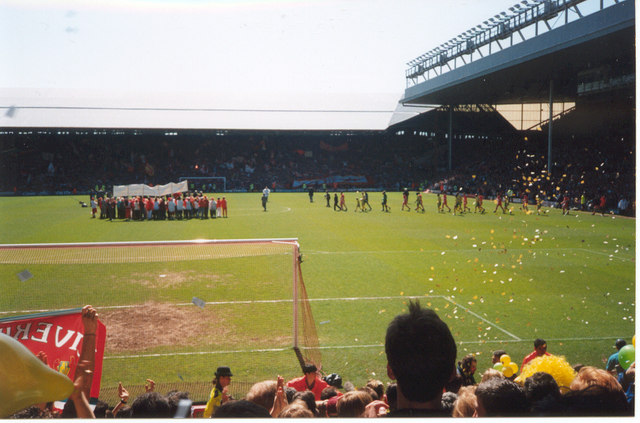
The Spion Kop before a game against Norwich City in 1994. It was redeveloped into an all-seater stand for the start of the next season, following the recommendations of the Taylor Report.

Liverpool started the 1990–91 season by winning their first eight league games. They remained unbeaten until a 3–0 loss to Arsenal in December, followed by another to Crystal Palace at the end of the month. The club's form began to tail off and Arsenal moved above them in January. After a 4–4 draw against Everton in an FA Cup replay in February, Dalglish announced his resignation as manager, citing stress as the reason. Coach Ronnie Moran became caretaker manager; he won three of the ten matches he was in charge of, as they fell further behind Arsenal. Former player Graeme Souness was announced as manager in April, but the club were unable to catch Arsenal, who won the league by seven points. Souness reshaped the team during the 1991–92 season. Beardsley, Gary Gillespie and Steve McMahon were sold. Souness bought Dean Saunders for £2.9 million, but Liverpool finished in sixth position, the first time they had finished outside the top two since 1981. The club did reach the final of the FA Cup against Sunderland, which they won 2–0. The season saw Liverpool compete in Europe for the first time since the Heysel stadium disaster in 1985; they were readmitted a year after other English clubs. Liverpool reached the quarter-finals of the UEFA Cup, where they lost to Italian team Genoa 4–1 over two legs. The Boot Room, which had been a meeting place for Liverpool's coaches since Bill Shankly was manager, was demolished during Souness' time at the club. A new press room was built in its place.

Anfield was redeveloped at the start of the 1992–93 season following the recommendations of the Taylor report. A second tier was added to the Kemlyn Road stand, which included executive boxes and function suites as well as 11,000 seats. Renamed the Centenary Stand, it was officially opened on 1 September 1992 by Union of European Football Associations (UEFA) president Lennart Johansson. In the inaugural season of the Premier League, Liverpool again finished in sixth place, losing fifteen of their forty-two matches. They exited early in the FA Cup, League Cup and UEFA Cup Winners' Cup. In the 1993–94 season Liverpool won their first three games, but their form dipped as they lost four consecutive games. One positive was the emergence of striker Robbie Fowler from the club's youth team. He scored on his first-team debut against Fulham in the first leg of a League Cup tie, and scored all five goals in the return leg as Liverpool won 5–0. Liverpool continued to struggle during the season, culminating in a defeat to Bristol City in an FA Cup replay. Souness was sacked after the match and replaced by coach Roy Evans. The club ended the season in eighth place after losing sixteen of their games. Liverpool began to fall behind their rivals off the pitch. Manchester United made £93 million after they were floated on the stock market, while Liverpool made £22 million when media company Granada bought 9.9% of the club.

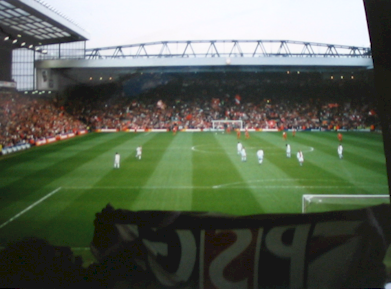
Paris Saint-Germain halted Liverpool's progress in the semi-final of the 1996–97 UEFA Cup Winners' Cup.

After the construction of the Centenary Stand, the Spion Kop was redeveloped for the start of the 1994–95 season. The stand became all-seater, retaining the single tier with a reduced capacity of 12,000. In Evans's first full season in charge, Liverpool finished in fourth place, their best finish since the departure of Dalglish. The club reached the sixth round of the FA Cup before losing 2–1 to Tottenham Hotspur, and reached the 1995 Football League Cup Final against Bolton Wanderers. Two goals from Steve McManaman helped Liverpool to a 2–1 victory as they won their fifth League Cup. The season also saw several long-serving players leave the club, as Grobbelaar, Nicol and Ronnie Whelan departed. Before the start of the 1995–96 season, Liverpool signalled their intent to improve upon the previous season, signing forward Stan Collymore for a British club record £8.5 million. Collymore scored the only goal in a 1–0 win over Sheffield Wednesday in the first game of the season. The season included a 4–3 win against Newcastle United at Anfield in April 1996 with Collymore scoring an injury-time winner – a game considered one of the greatest in Premier League history. Liverpool finished in third place. They reached the final of the FA Cup against Manchester United; an 85th-minute goal from Eric Cantona secured a 1–0 victory for United. The Cup final saw the appearance of Liverpool players in cream Armani suits, an incident which generated most headlines for an under-achieving group of players the media had pejoratively dubbed the Spice Boys, who were perceived as focusing on partying, sports cars, fame and hairstyles rather than football.

Liverpool started the 1996–97 season well, and by the turn of the year they were top of the league, two points clear of Arsenal. The club were unable to maintain their form during the rest of the season, losses to Coventry City, Manchester United and Wimbledon resulted in the club finishing the season in fourth position. Despite early exits in the League and FA Cup, Liverpool reached the semi-finals of the UEFA Cup Winners' Cup. They were unable to progress after a 3–0 defeat in the first-leg, despite winning the second leg 2–0, and were knocked out 3–2 on aggregate against French team Paris Saint-Germain. Liverpool were without striker Fowler for the start of the 1997–98 season after he suffered knee ligament damage in a pre-season friendly. This was offset by the emergence of Michael Owen, who scored eighteen goals from thirty-six appearances. Paul Ince was signed to replace Barnes who joined Newcastle United. Liverpool were unable to challenge eventual winners Arsenal and finished thirteen points behind in third place. Further redevelopment took place at Anfield during the season with a second tier added to the Anfield Road stand.

== 1998–2006: Fluctuating fortunes ==
Liverpool appointed Frenchman Gérard Houllier as co-manager alongside Evans for the 1998–99 season. Poor results put pressure on the partnership, and after a 3–1 defeat by Tottenham Hotspur in the League Cup, Evans resigned. Houllier's first game as sole manager was a 3–1 defeat to Leeds United. Liverpool's form did not improve under Houllier and early exits in the UEFA and FA Cup were followed by the club finishing the season in seventh place, missing the qualification spots for European competition. Houllier reshaped the squad at the start of the 1999–2000 season. New players were brought into the squad such as Dietmar Hamann, Sami Hyypiä and Sander Westerveld; David James, Ince and McManaman left the club. Houllier continued the reshaping into the season when he signed forward Emile Heskey for a club record £11 million in March. Liverpool failed to secure a return to the UEFA Champions League, as they finished the season in fourth place. They also performed poorly in the FA and League Cup, exiting early in both competitions.

In the 2000–01 season Liverpool won three competitions to complete a unique treble of trophies. The first trophy was the League Cup, when they beat Birmingham City 5–4 in a penalty shoot-out after the match had finished 1–1. They then won the FA Cup, as Owen scored two goals in the last ten minutes to overturn a one-goal deficit to win the match against Arsenal 2–1. The final trophy the club won was the UEFA Cup. An own goal in the last minute of extra time by Delfí Geli secured a 5–4 victory over Spanish team Alavés. Liverpool finished the league in third place, securing a return to the European Cup (now the UEFA Champions League) for the first time since the Heysel Stadium disaster. Liverpool's participation in the UEFA Champions League in the 2001–02 season saw the club reach the quarter-finals, where they were eliminated by German team Bayer Leverkusen 4–3 on aggregate. The season was Liverpool's best in the league in recent years, as they finished second, seven points behind Arsenal. Despite their improved performance in the league, Liverpool were unable to defend the FA and League Cup, exiting in the fourth and third rounds respectively. The season was overshadowed by Houllier's heart problems. He suffered chest pain at half-time during a match with Leeds at Anfield. He had an eleven-hour operation to fix an acute dissection of the aorta and did not return until February. His assistant Phil Thompson took charge of the team in the interim.

Houllier signed several players at the start of the 2002–03 season, including Bruno Cheyrou, Salif Diao and El-Hadji Diouf. The former was preferred to Nicolas Anelka, despite the latter performing well during his loan from Paris Saint-Germain the previous season. Liverpool were unbeaten in their first twelve games in the league, which gave them a seven-point lead. A defeat to Middlesbrough in their next game started a run of twelve games without victory until they beat Southampton 1–0 in January. The club finished the season in fifth place. Despite early exits in the FA Cup and UEFA Champions League, Liverpool won the League Cup, defeating Manchester United in the final. The 2003–04 season started poorly for Liverpool as they lost their first game 2–1 to Chelsea. By the end of the year they had lost six of their eighteen matches in the league. In the second half of the season they only lost a further four games to finish in fourth position securing a place in the 2004–05 UEFA Champions League. They exited the UEFA and League Cup in the fourth round. In the FA Cup, they were eliminated by Portsmouth 1–0 in a fifth-round replay. At the end of the season Houllier was replaced as manager by Rafael Benítez.

The 2004–05 season was a disappointment in the league as Liverpool finished in fifth place outside the UEFA Champions League qualification places. They were eliminated from the FA Cup third round by Burnley. The club reached the final of the League Cup, but lost 3–2 to Chelsea. Liverpool also reached the final of the UEFA Champions League. A game that would become known as the Miracle of Istanbul, it appeared the club would lose their second final of the season when they were 3–0 down to Italian team Milan at half-time, but three goals in six minutes allowed Liverpool to draw level at 3–3. No goals in extra time meant the match went to a penalty shoot-out, which they won 3–2. A fifth-place finish in the Premier League meant Liverpool were not guaranteed entry into the Champions League and faced the prospect of not being able to defend their European title. UEFA eventually ruled that they would be allowed to do so, but would be required to start in the first qualifying round. They were eliminated in the first knockout round by Portuguese team Benfica. In the 2005–06 season they finished in third place. They also reached the 2006 FA Cup Final where they faced West Ham United. Liverpool won 3–1 in a penalty shoot-out after the match finished 3–3.

== 2006–15: Near misses ==
The 2006–07 season was Liverpool's first after American businessmen George Gillett and Tom Hicks bought the club, in a deal which valued it and its outstanding debts at £218.9 million. Liverpool once more came third in the league, this time 21 points behind Manchester United. They went out of both domestic cup competitions to Arsenal, but reached the 2007 UEFA Champions League Final where they again faced Milan. Unlike 2005, Liverpool were unable to recover from going behind, and lost the match 2–1. During the summer, Benítez strengthened his team by signing Fernando Torres for a club record £24 million, and midfielders Ryan Babel and Yossi Benayoun. They drew thirteen of their 38 matches and finished the season in fourth place. Liverpool exited the FA and League Cup in the fifth round, but in the UEFA Champions League reached the semi-finals for the third time in four seasons, where they lost 4–3 on aggregate to Chelsea. Torres scored 33 goals in all competitions, and in the process broke two club records; he became the first Liverpool striker since Fowler to score more than 20 goals in a league season, and equalled Roger Hunt's run of scoring in consecutive league matches at Anfield (8).

In the 2008–09 season a 5–1 victory over Newcastle United in December gave Liverpool a three-point lead in the league with half of the season remaining. They did not win any games in January and, despite good form for the remainder of the season, were unable to catch Manchester United and finished in second place. In the FA and League Cup, they were eliminated in the fourth round. In the UEFA Champions League, they were again eliminated by Chelsea, this time at the quarter-final stage. The 2009–10 season was a disappointment for Liverpool as they were unable to improve on the previous season's performance, finishing seventh in the league. They lost eleven matches, nine more than the previous season, to finish outside the top four for the first time since 2005. The club also suffered poor form in the UEFA Champions League; they were eliminated in the group stages and subsequently entered the UEFA Cup (now rebranded as the UEFA Europa League). In the Europa League they reached the semi-finals. Their opponents were Spanish team Atlético Madrid, who progressed to the final on the away goals rule after the tie finished 2–2 on aggregate. Benitez left the club by mutual consent at the end of the season and was replaced by Roy Hodgson.

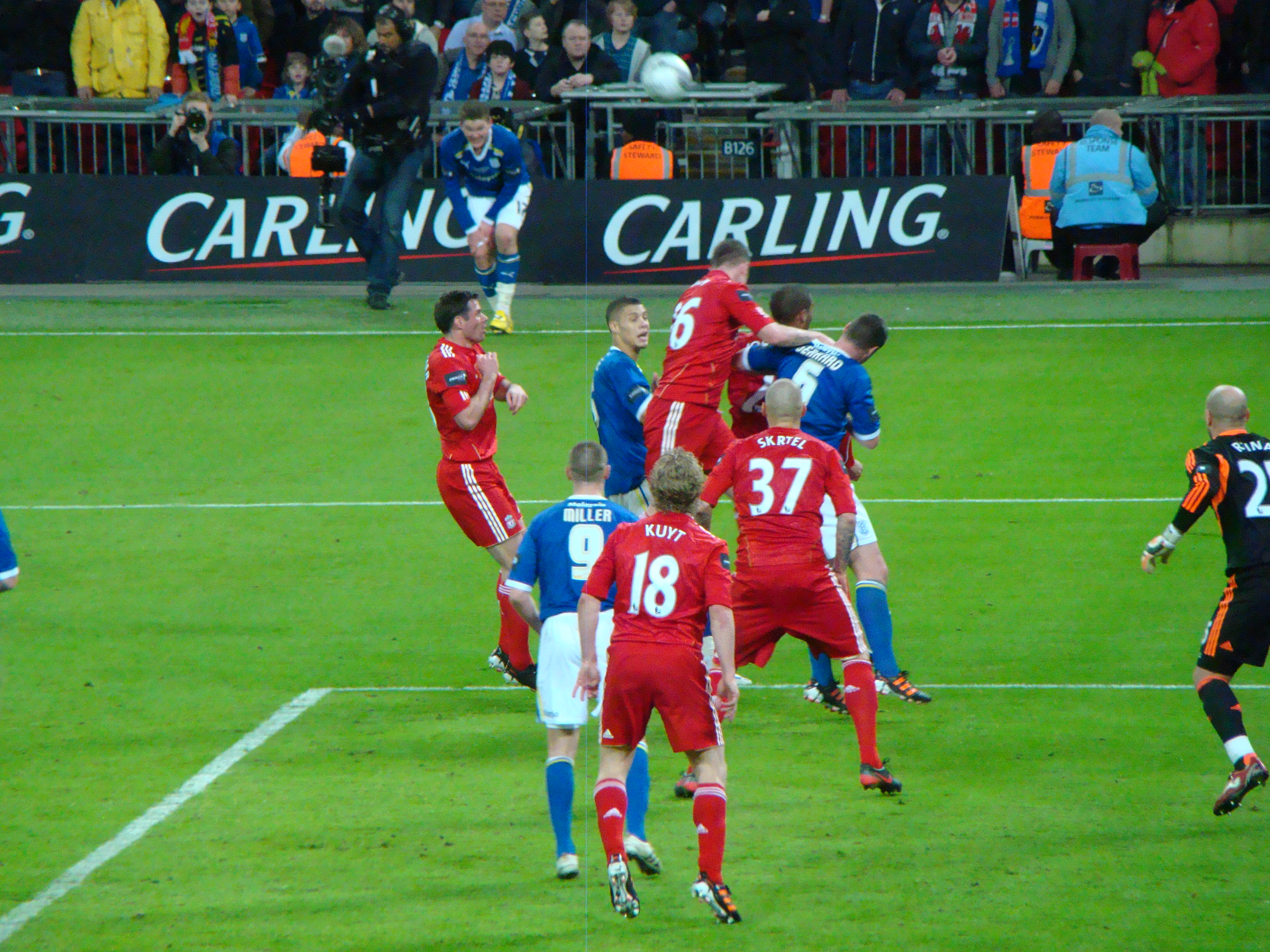
Cardiff and Liverpool players during the 2012 Football League Cup Final

The club was sold to Fenway Sports Group during the 2010–11 season. Accounts had shown that Liverpool were £350 million in debt with losses of £55 million, causing auditor KPMG to qualify its audit opinion. The Royal Bank of Scotland, who were the club's creditors, took owners Gillett and Hicks to court to force through a sale. The court ruled in the creditors' favour and the club was sold to Fenway Sports Group for £300 million on 15 October 2010. On the pitch, Liverpool's performances were poor. A 3–1 defeat to Blackburn Rovers in January left the club in twelfth place in the league with nine defeats from twenty games. Hodgson was sacked after the match and replaced by former manager Dalglish. After a loss in his first match against Manchester United in the FA Cup, Liverpool eventually finished the season in sixth place. Dalglish bought several players at the start of the 2011–12 season, including Charlie Adam, Stewart Downing and Jordan Henderson. They finished in eighth place, the club's worst finish in eighteen years. In both the League Cup and FA Cup, they reached the final. The club won a record eighth League Cup, with a 3–2 penalty shoot-out victory against Cardiff City after the match finished 2–2. Liverpool lost the 2012 FA Cup Final 2–1 to Chelsea. The season was marred by the Luis Suárez abuse incident in October during a match against Manchester United, in which he racially abused Patrice Evra. He was fined £40,000 and banned for eight games. Dalglish was sacked at the end of the season and replaced by Brendan Rodgers.

Rodgers promised "to dedicate my life to fight for this club and defend the great principles of Liverpool Football Club on and off the field." Liverpool finished seventh in his first season, but outperformed expectations the following season to put them into title contention. A victory over Manchester City put them four wins away from their first title since 1990, but their run of 11 consecutive victories was halted by a 2–0 home loss to Chelsea. The defeat meant the title race was out of Liverpool's control. Having taken a 3–0 lead in their next match, away at Crystal Palace, Liverpool conceded three times in the final 15 minutes to draw 3–3 and were overhauled by Manchester City. Liverpool went into the final day with a chance of winning the league, but Manchester City beat West Ham to be crowned champions. In July, Suárez was sold to Barcelona for £75 million, and the following January Steven Gerrard agreed a move to the LA Galaxy at the end of the campaign, ending 17 years at the club. Rodgers was sacked after a poor start to the 2015–16 season.

== 2015–24: Revival under Klopp ==
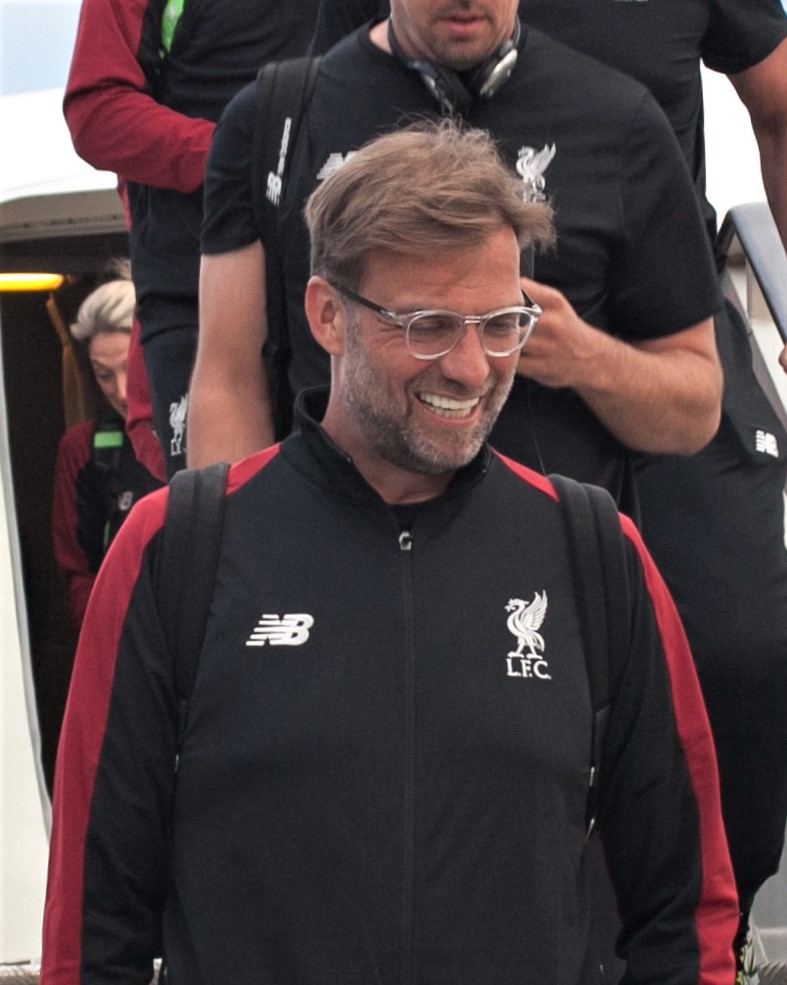
Jürgen Klopp led Liverpool to consecutive UEFA Champions League finals in 2018 and 2019, winning the latter—the club's sixth European title.

Following Rodgers' dismissal, it was announced on 8 October 2015 that Jürgen Klopp had agreed a three-year deal to manage the club. In his first press conference, Klopp stated his intention to bring trophies to the club within four years, and jokingly titled himself 'The Normal One' in a parody of José Mourinho's famous 'The Special One' comments from 2004. After Klopp's appointment, Liverpool reached the finals of the League Cup and UEFA Europa League, losing the former 3–1 in a penalty shoot-out after the match finished 1–1, and the latter 3–1 to Sevilla in Basel. In Liverpool's first full season under Klopp, they finished fourth. Another fourth-place finish followed the season after, and Klopp guided the side to the 2018 UEFA Champions League Final, where they lost 3–1 to Real Madrid. Klopp subsequently made a number of high-profile signings, including centre-half Virgil van Dijk in January, for a reported fee of £75 million, a world record transfer fee for a defender. In the same transfer window, attacking midfielder Philippe Coutinho was sold to Barcelona with a transfer fee of £105 million, potentially rising to £142 million should various clauses be met. In the summer, the club signed midfielders Naby Keïta and Fabinho, forward Xherdan Shaqiri, and goalkeeper Alisson.

Liverpool started the 2018–19 season with their best-ever league start, winning their first six matches. A 4–0 win against Newcastle United on 26 December saw Liverpool extend their lead in the table to six points at the half-way point of the season and become only the fourth Premier League team to be unbeaten at this stage. Equalling the all-time record for the fewest goals conceded half-way through top-flight season, Liverpool conceded 7 goals and kept 12 clean sheets in 19 matches. Ultimately, Liverpool finished a season-long title battle as runners-up to Manchester City, to whom they suffered their only league defeat of the season. Winning all of their last nine matches, Liverpool scored 97 points, the third-highest total in the history of the English top-flight and the most points scored by a team without winning the title, and remained unbeaten at home for the second season running; their thirty league wins matched the club record for wins in a season. Liverpool reached the Champions League final for the second consecutive year after overcoming a 3–0 first-leg deficit by beating Barcelona 4–0 in the second leg at Anfield. In the 2019 final, Liverpool defeated Tottenham Hotspur 2–0 to secure the club's sixth European title and end a seven-year trophy drought.

Liverpool's first game of the 2019–20 season was the 2019 FA Community Shield where they faced Premier League champions Manchester City, losing 5–4 on penalties. The second trophy under Klopp's management came in the 2019 UEFA Super Cup, where they defeated fellow English club Chelsea 5–4 on penalties. It was Liverpool's fourth triumph in the annual contest, placing them behind only Barcelona and AC Milan, who had five titles apiece. Having finished as runners-up on three previous occasions, Liverpool won their first FIFA Club World Cup in 2019 after defeating Brazilian club Flamengo 1–0 in the final after extra-time, making them the first English side to win the international treble of the UEFA Champions League, UEFA Super Cup and FIFA Club World Cup. In December 2019 Klopp signed a contract extension keeping him at the club until 2024. Liverpool topped the 2019–20 Premier League by 13 points after 21 games (with two games in hand), registering 61 points from their first 21 games – the most ever at that stage of the season by a side in Europe's top five leagues. On 13 March 2020, after having played 29 games of the season and with Liverpool having an unprecedented 25-point lead over second-place Manchester City, it was announced following a decision by the Premier League that the current season had been suspended until 4 April at the earliest, after a number of players and club staff had become ill due to the coronavirus pandemic. This was extended six days later to 30 April. Liverpool returned to action against Everton in the Merseyside derby on 21 June with a 0–0 draw. The 30-year wait for their 19th top-flight title (and first in the Premier League era) ended on 25 June with Chelsea defeating Manchester City, leaving City 23 points behind Liverpool with only 21 left available. Liverpool had won the title with a record seven games left in the season.

On 27 February 2022, Liverpool won a record ninth League Cup following an 11–10 penalty shoot-out win against Chelsea in the final. On 3 May, Liverpool defeated Villarreal 5–2 on aggregate in the Champions League semi-finals to reach the final. On 14 May, Liverpool beat Chelsea 6–5 on penalties in the 2022 FA Cup final after a 0–0 draw to win their eighth FA Cup and their first under Klopp, completing the domestic cup double for the 2021–22 season. However, they finished a season-long title battle as runners-up to Manchester City by one point for the second time in four seasons despite having a 3–1 victory against Wolverhampton Wanderers on the final day in the Premier League. On 28 May, Liverpool were defeated 1–0 in the Champions League final against Real Madrid, Klopp's second Champions League final loss in charge of the club.

On 30 July 2022, Liverpool won their first FA Community Shield under Klopp and their 16th overall, defeating Manchester City 3–1 to claim the 2022 title. On 26 January 2024, Klopp confirmed his intention to leave Liverpool at the end of the 2023–24 Premier League season. On 25 February 2024, Liverpool won their record-extending 10th League Cup title by defeating Chelsea 1–0 at Wembley Stadium with a 118th-minute header by captain Virgil van Dijk.

== 2024–: Slot and Iraola ==
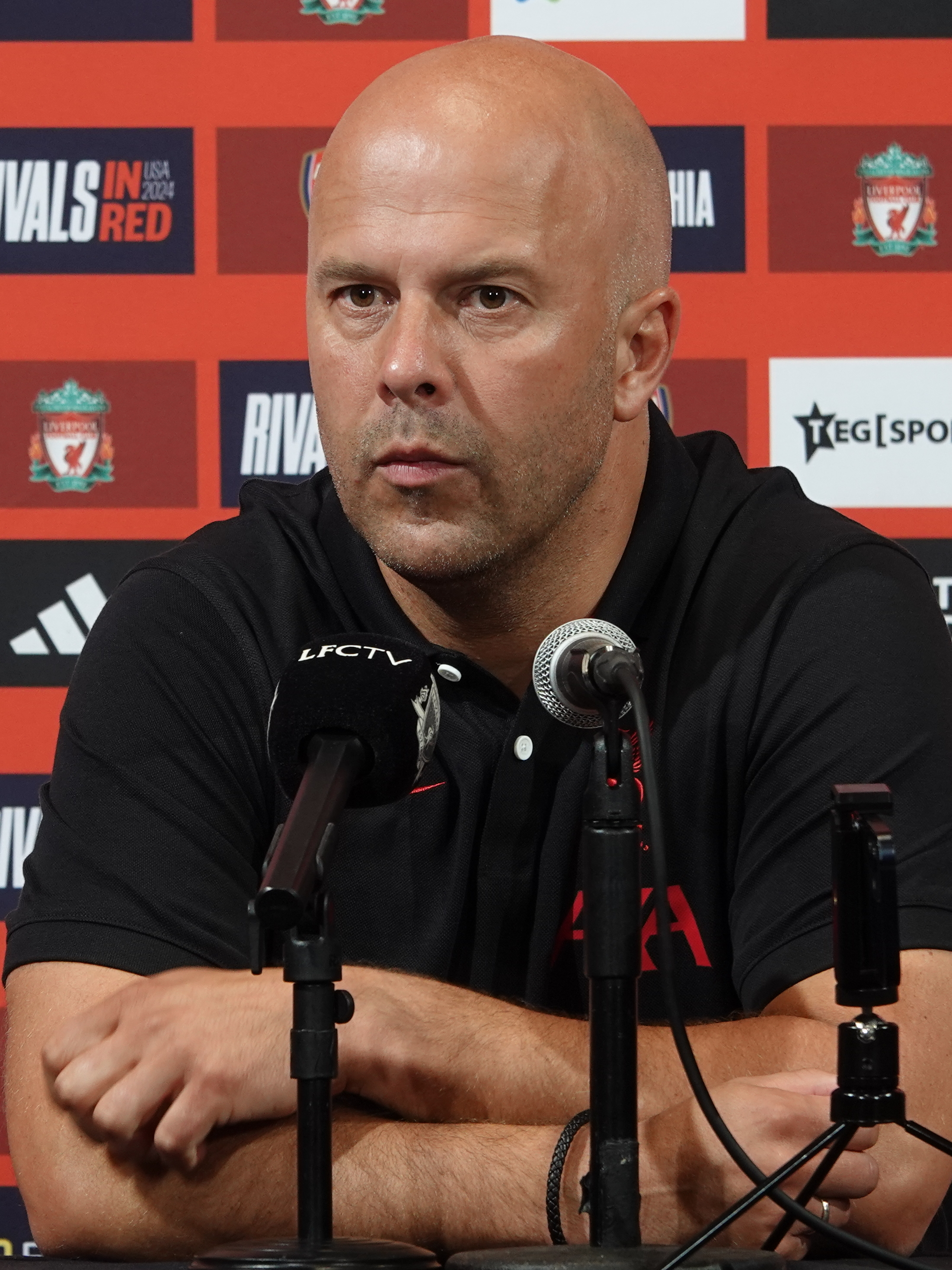
Slot, with Liverpool, in 2024

Arne Slot, head coach of Eredivisie club Feyenoord, was announced as Klopp's successor for the 2024–25 season. The Premier League campaign started with one loss in the first 30 games. Liverpool reached the 2025 EFL Cup final, losing 2–1. Liverpool were successful in the league, with Slot guiding the club to a record-equalling twentieth top-flight title, which was secured in a 5–1 win over Tottenham Hotspur in April. The club held a parade on 26 May to celebrate, but a driver drove into supporters and attendees on Water Street, injuring over 130 people. The driver, 53-year-old Merseyside resident Paul Doyle, pleaded guilty and was sentenced to over 21 years in prison. On 3 July, Liverpool player Diogo Jota was killed in a car crash near Cernadilla, Spain alongside his brother, André Silva. Jota's kit number, 20, was retired following his death. Slot was dismissed by the club on 30 May 2026, following a fifth-place finish in the Premier League, and a season devoid of trophies.

On 4 June 2026, Andoni Iraola (previously a player for Athletic Bilbao and Spain and the coach of Rayo Vallecano and AFC Bournemouth) signed as head coach on a two-year contract. In August 2026, Fenway Sports Group sold 38% of Liverpool F.C. to 1892 Holdings, a consortium led by former Queens Park Rangers co-owner Amit Bhatia and backed by Jeff Bezos and Eduardo Saverin. Bhatia was named vice-chairman of the club. In the same month, the departure of Curtis Jones to Inter Milan and the stalled progress of Jayden Danns left the likely prospect that no player born in Liverpool would make an appearance for the club during the coming season, breaking a sequence stretching back to 1892.
