= Stratus (Serbian band) =

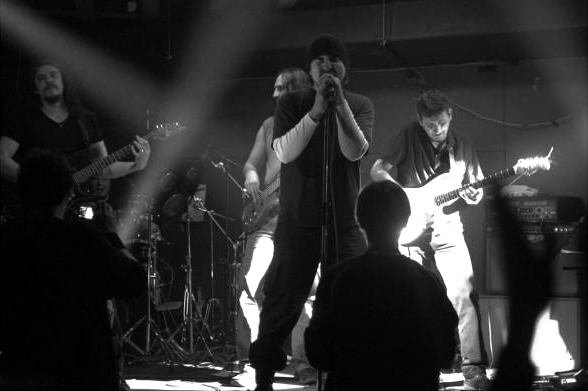

Background information
- Origin: Jagodina/Ruma, Serbia
- Genres: Hard rock, heavy metal, progressive metal
- Years active: 2002 – present
- Labels: One Records, Take It Or Leave It Records
- Members: Darko Konstantinoviċ; Saša Jankoviċ; Nenad Jovanović
- Past members: Goran Pešić; Goran Nikolić; Aleksandar Ljubisavljević; Nenad Vukeliċ; Ðorđe Jeremiċ; Slaviša Malenoviċ
- Website: www.stratusband.com

Stratus (Serbian Cyrillic: Стратус) is a Serbian hard rock and heavy metal band.

== Band history ==
The band was formed in 2002 by guitarists Darko Konstantinoviċ and Saša Jankoviċ. A former Osvajači vocalist Nenad Jovanović joined the band in 2003. With Goran Pešić (bass guitar), Goran Nikolić (drums) and Aleksandar Ljubisavljević (keyboard), they released their self-titled debut album Stratus in March 2005.

In 2008, Nenad Vukeliċ (bass guitar), Sale Stojković (drums) and Slaviša Malenoviċ (keyboards) became the band's new members. In 2008, the band released their second studio album Equilibrium.

== Discography ==
=== Studio albums ===
- Stratus (2005)
- Equilibrium? (2008)
