= Irish Stew of Sindidun =

Serbian Celtic rock band

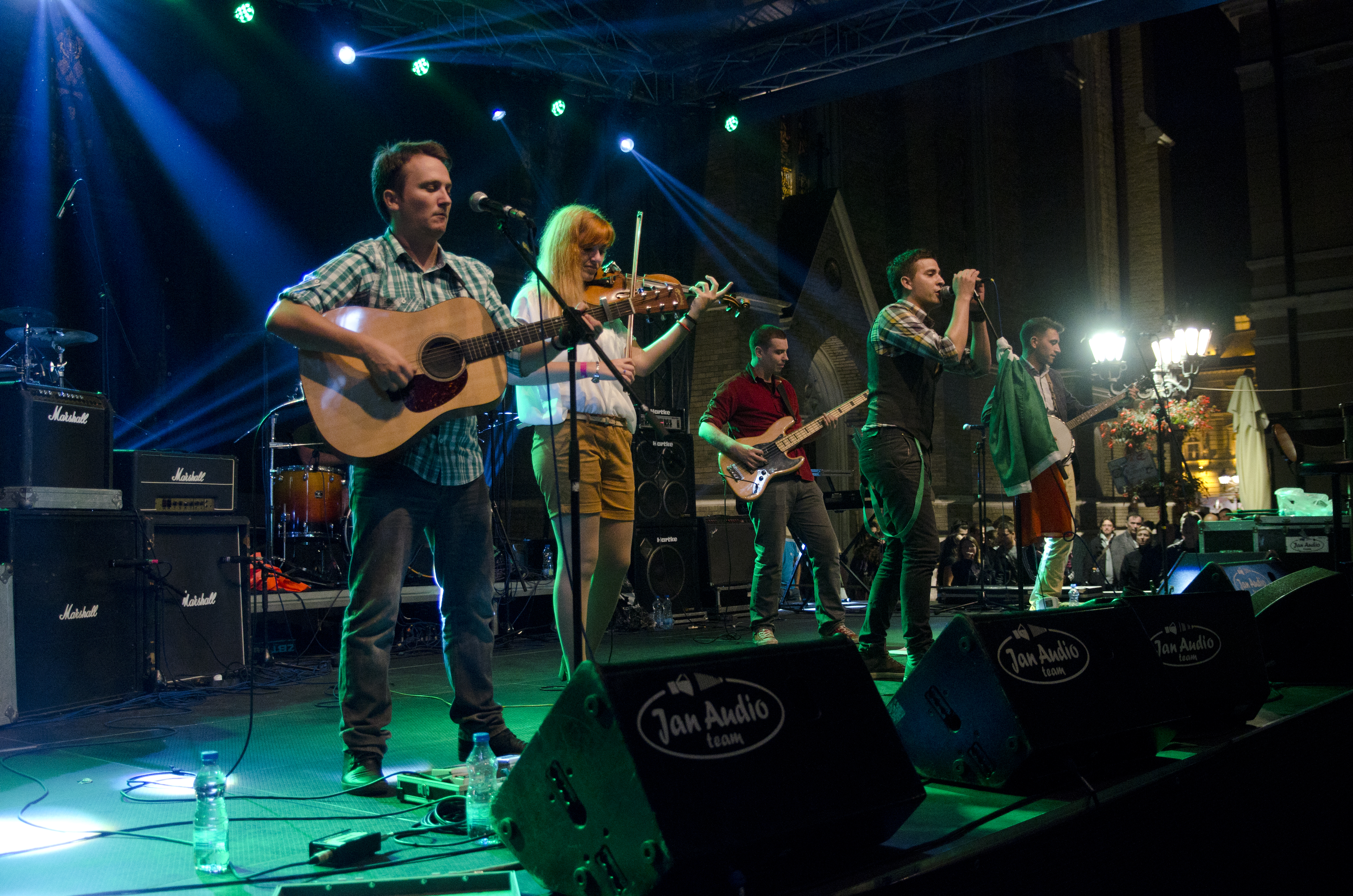
- Irish Stew of Sindidun in 2014

Background information
- Origin: Belgrade, Serbia
- Genres: Irish folk, Celtic rock, Celtic punk
- Years active: 2003 – present
- Label: Ammonite Records
- Members: Bojan Petrović; Ana Đokić Brusić; Ivan Đurić; Nenad Gavrilov; Aleksandar Gospodinov; Marko Jovanović
- Past members: Pavle Medan; Marko Krasnić; Ana Mrkobrada; Ana Milanović; Nemanja Jovanović
- Website: irishstew.net

Irish Stew of Sindidun (often referred to as Irish Stew only) is a Serbian Celtic rock band from Belgrade. While initially playing Irish folk music, the band later made a shift towards light punk rock, inspired by Irish folk music and other genres. Beside their own songs, the band performs covers of Irish traditional songs and songs by The Pogues.

== History ==
=== 2000s ===
The first ideas of forming an Irish folk band came up in 2002, when Bojan Petrović (lead vocals, tin whistles) and Nenad Gavrilov (acoustic guitar, backing vocals), both fans of Irish music, decided to start playing together. After several attempts, the band was officially formed in January 2003. At that time the band did not perform live and did not have a name, but a few months later, it got a name and new members. The lineup, beside Petrović and Gavrilov, included Ivan Ðurić (banjo, electric guitar, backing vocals), Ana Mrkobrada (violin), Aleksandar Gospodinov (bass guitar, backing vocals) and Pavle Medan (drums).

The first Irish Stew of Sindidun live appearance happened on June 26, 2003, on a radio show Celtic Night broadcast by Obrenovac Radio. After getting positive reviews, the band started playing frequently. Even though the band was formed as a cover band, the band members started writing their own songs and soon the band entered several demo band competitions. In 2004, the band got the Audience Award on Demo Masters Tournament 2004 organized by radio Belgrade 202 and an award of the Demo Maraton 2004 organized by the Belgrade Youth Cultural Center.

The band entered the studio in 2005 and recorded their debut album entitled So Many Words.... The album was released on October 31, 2005, through One Records and it featured nine original tracks and three covers of Irish traditional songs. Promotional videos were recorded for the tracks "Puzzle Of Life" and "Why".

The band continued concert activities and started preparing their second album which was released in March 2008. Dare to Dream, recorded with the new drummer, Marko Krasnić, was released through One Records and featured ten original tracks and two traditional covers. In late December 2008 the Celtic punk fan site shitenonions.com ranked Dare to Dream the fifth best release of 2008. In March 2009, a promotional video was released for the song "Ditch", and on June 26, the band held a sixth anniversary concert at the Belgrade SKC Living room. During 2009, drummer Krasnić left the band, being replaced by Marko Jovanović.

=== 2010s ===
In August, 2011, the band released the single "Lady of New Tomorrow", available for free download from the band's official website, announcing their third studio album. The album New Tomorrow, recorded with new violinist, Ana Milanović, was released on October 6, available both on CD, released by One Records, and in a form of multimedia application, available for free download from the band's official website. At the about same time, Bojan Petrović joined Orthodox Celts, playing whistles and singing backing vocals, continuing to lead Irish Stew of Sindidun. In 2016, Petrović left Orthodox Celts.

In October 2017, the band released their fourth studio album, City of Grigs. The album, announced by the single "Heavier than Sin", released in March 2016, was released through Ammonite Records. The album featured ten songs, three of which were covers of traditional Irish songs.

== Discography ==
- So Many Words... (2005)
- Dare to Dream (2008)
- New Tomorrow (2011)
- City of Grigs (2017)
