= One Records (Serbia) =

Serbian record label

- Founded: 1999
- Genre: Rock; Hip hop
- Country of origin: Serbia
- Location: Belgrade
- Official website: onerecords.rs

One Records is a record label based in Belgrade, Serbia.

Formed in 1999, its catalogue covers a fairly wide musical spectrum - from hard rock and heavy metal bands such as Alogia, Cactus Jack, Dargoron, Stratus, and others, to Irish folk/Celtic rock bands Tir na n'Og and Irish Stew of Sindidun, to the local hip-hop scene with acts like Bad Copy, Škabo, Ajs Nigrutin, Wikluh Sky, and others.

The label has also rereleased albums by Bjesovi, Ekatarina Velika, Goblini, Oktobar 1864, Riblja Čorba, Smak, Vlatko Stefanovski, Suncokret, S Vremena Na Vreme, Van Gogh, YU Grupa, and others. One Records has also released albums by Divlje Jagode, Jørn Lande, Osmi Putnik, Pretty Maids, Toto, Joe Lynn Turner, Whitesnake, and other acts for the Serbian market.

== Artists ==
Some of the artists currently signed to One Records, or who have been in the past, are:

- Ajs Nigrutin
- Alogia
- Griva
- Bad Copy
- Bombarder
- Cactus Jack
- Dargoron
- Divlje Jagode
- Forever Storm
- Irish Stew of Sindidun
- Karizma
- Bilja Krstić
- Monolit
- Muzika Poludelih
- Osmi Putnik
- Ritam Nereda
- Smak
- Stratus
- Sunshine
- Škabo
- Tir na n'Og
- Wikluh Sky
- Zona B

== See also ==
- List of record labels
