= Jelen Pivo Live =

- Genre: Rock
- Locations: Belgrade, Serbia
- Years active: 2006 – 2012
- Founders: Apatin Brewery
- Website: www.jelenpivo.com

Jelen Pivo Live was a musical event held in Belgrade, Serbia from 2006 to 2012 in order to promote the Apatin Brewery brand Jelen pivo. The first Jelen Pivo Live was organized as a festival featuring only Serbian rock acts, but the following year beside Serbian bands, foreign acts were also included in the festival lineup. Foreign acts that performed on the festival include Ian Brown, Happy Mondays, Gary Moore, Dinosaur Jr., The Stooges, The Lemonheads, The Fall, Heavy Trash, Echo & the Bunnymen and The Rakes. Since 2010, the event was held as a concert of one foreign act (Guns N' Roses in 2010, Slash in 2011 and Metallica in 2012).

== 2006 ==
In 2006 the festival's inaugural edition was held in Belgrade's SKC (Students Cultural Centre) over two days - on December 15 and 16. The festival had two stages.

On the opening night, the lineup featured Partibrejkers, Sunshine, Eyesburn, Orthodox Celts on the main stage as well as Škabo, Straight Jackin', Discord, Irie FM, and Flip Out on the second stage.

The second night, the main stage featured Discipline A Kitschme, Obojeni Program, Darkwood Dub and Neočekivana Sila Koja Se Iznenada Pojavljuje i Rešava Stvar and on the second stage appeared Intruder, Popečitelji, Repetitor, and Supernaut.

== 2007 ==
In 2007, Apatin Brewery decided to organize the festival at the larger venue and include foreign acts in the lineup beside the Serbian rock acts. The festival was held at the Kalemegdan Fortress and lasted for three days, from September 7 to September 9.

The lineup featured Ian Brown, Happy Mondays, Gary Moore, Hladno Pivo, Let 3, Discipline A Kitschme, Partibrejkers, Plejboj, Darkwood Dub, Obojeni Program, Marčelo, Dado Topić & Time, Darko Rundek, and Laibach. As a special feature, the festival gave opportunity to young musicians to show their onstage ability.

== 2008 ==
The Stooges performing live at the festival in 2008

In 2008 the festival moved to Tašmajdan Stadium. This time the festival was chosen to last for only two days, September 5 and 6.

The first evening on the festival appeared Repetitor, Jarboli, Hypnotized, Električni Orgazam, Dinosaur Jr. and The Stooges. The second night featured Strip, Shiroko, Majke, Discipline A Kitschme, The Lemonheads and Partibrejkers. This year the festival was raising awareness about environmental issues by promoting a tin recycling campaign with the motto "Reciklirajte i Vi!" ("You, too, should recycle!").

== 2009 ==
In 2009 the festival went back to SKC. It lasted for two days, September 18 and 19. The lineup featured The Fall, Heavy Trash, Obojeni Program, ŽeneKese and Kanda, Kodža i Nebojša on the September 18, and Echo & the Bunnymen, The Rakes, Eva Braun, Nežni Dalibor and Veliki Prezir on September 19. The motto of this year's festival was "Kad pijem, ne vozim" ("When I drink, I don't drive"), as a part of the cooperation between Serbian breweries and Serbian Ministry of Internal Affairs.

== 2010 ==
The fifth Jelen Pivo Live was not organized as a festival, but rather as the Guns N' Roses concert, held on September 23 at the Belgrade Arena. The concert featured the Canadian band Danko Jones and the Serbian band Night Shift as the opening acts.

== 2011 ==
The sixth Jelen Pivo Live was organized as the Slash concert, on July 31 at the Belgrade Arena. The Serbian band Tea Break performed as the opening act.

== 2012 ==
The seventh Jelen Pivo Live was organized as the Metallica concert, on May 8 at the Ušće. At the concert, which featured Gojira and Machine Head as opening acts, Metallica performed their 1991 eponymously titled album in its entirety. In 2012, Jelen Pivo Live also participated in the organization of IQ festival, which was held on June 9 in Belgrade Arena, and featured Marilyn Manson, Mizar, Block Out, Laibach and Dirty Vegas.
