= SPC Vojvodina =

Multi-purpose venue in Novi Sad, Serbia

- СПЦ Војводина
- SPENS
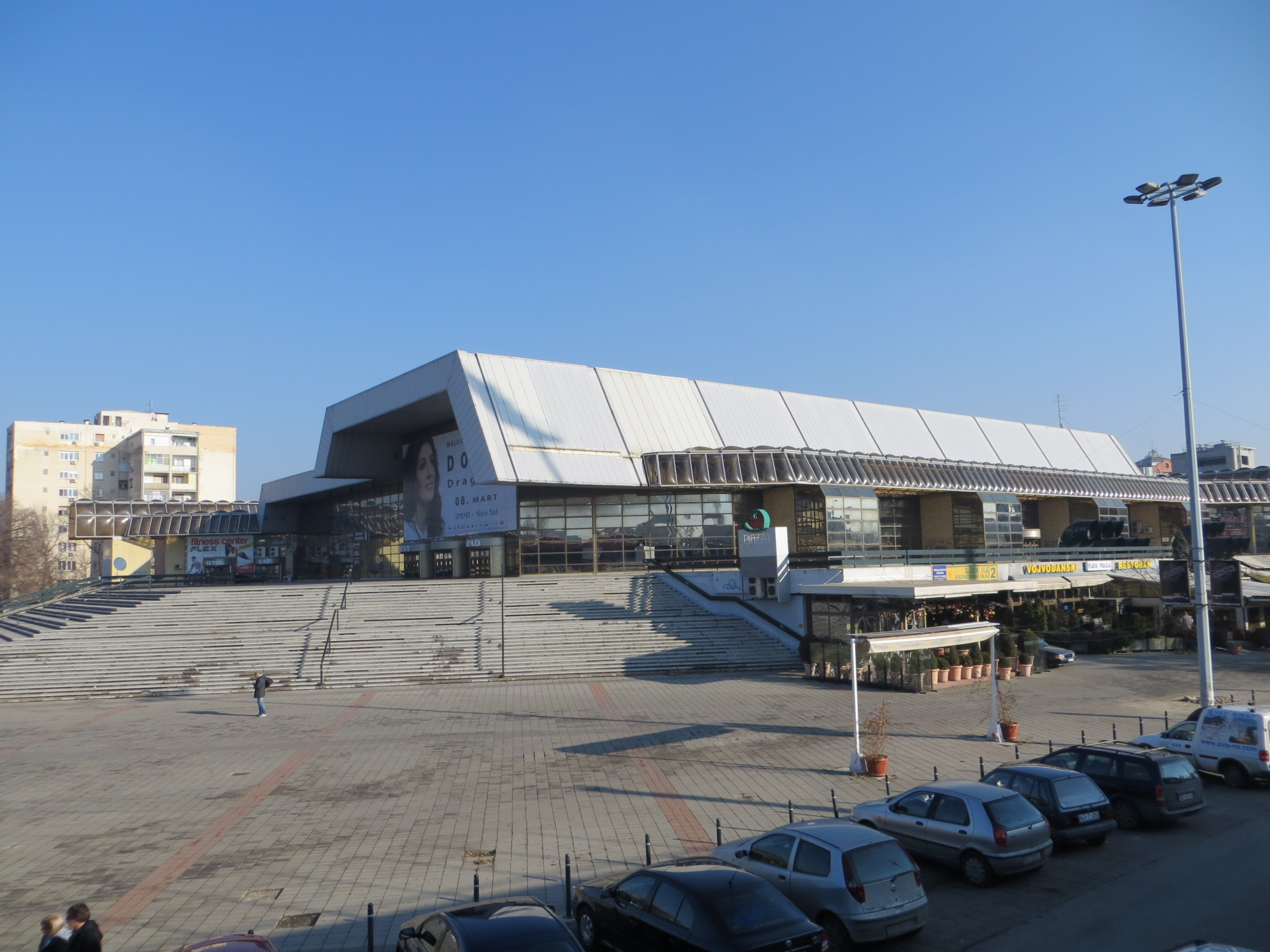
- SPENS in December 2013.
- Interactive map of SPC Vojvodina
- Full name: Sportski i poslovni centar Vojvodina
- Address: Sutjeska 2
- Location: Novi Sad, Serbia
- Coordinates: 45°14′51″N 19°50′44″E
- Operator: JP SPC Vojvodina
- Capacity: 6,987 (Main Hall); 1,030 (Small Hall); 1,283 (Ice-hockey Rink); 1,000 (Indoors Swimming Pool)
- Event: Sporting events
- Scoreboard: Yes
- Acreage: 21 acres

Construction
- Groundbreaking: 1979
- Built: 1981
- Opened: 14 April 1981; 45 years ago
- Architects: Živorad Janković; Branko Bulić; Duško Bogunović

Tenants
- HK Vojvodina; KK Vojvodina; OK Vojvodina; RK Vojvodina; ŽKK Vojvodina

Website
- www.spens.rs

SPC Vojvodina (Serbian Cyrillic: СПЦ Војводина), short for Sports and Business Center Vojvodina (Serbian: Спортски и пословни центар Војводина, romanized: Sportski i poslovni centar Vojvodina), commonly referred to as SPENS (Serbian Cyrillic: СПЕНС), is a multi-purpose venue located in Novi Sad, Vojvodina, Serbia.

== History ==
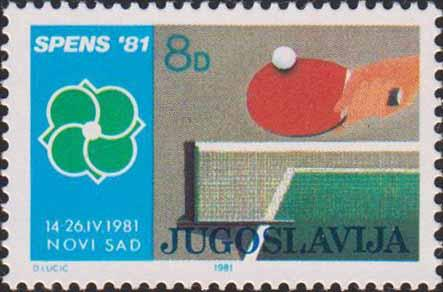
Yugoslav stamp dedicated to the 1981 World Table Tennis Championships

Its construction started in 1979, based on the design documentation produced by the Institute of Architecture, Urbanism and Spatial Planning, at the University of Sarajevo. The authors of the original, competition-winning design were Prof. Zivorad Jankovic, Prof. Branko Bulic and Eng. Dusko Bogunovic. The construction of the main and the small hall was completed in less than two years. On 14 April 1981, the complex opened its door for the first time, its inaugural event being the 1981 World Table Tennis Championships, event named "SPENS '81" at the time (later the venue was unofficially named after the event name). In the following years, additional objects were opened. However, several objects were not constructed even though they were in the project, like open swimming pool, open skating rink and open courts for team sports.

As of 2019, SPENS is operated by the state-owned company JP "Sportski i poslovni centar Vojvodina", which in addition to SPENS also has Sports Center Sajmište (Serbian: Спортски центар Сајмиште, romanized: Sportski centar Sajmište) under its umbrella.

== Features ==
Sprawling over 85,000 m^{2}, SPENS consists of Main Hall (capacity: 6,987 seats), Small Hall (capacity: 1,030), ice-hockey rink (capacity: 1,623), bowling alley, shooting range, 3 training halls, swimming pool, 11 tennis courts, media center, 2 press centers, amphitheater, reception salon, conference hall, double-level garage, and 215 retail and business spaces that house banks, furniture stores, tourist agencies, jewelers, bookstores, pool halls, fitness clubs, boutiques, etc.

== Sports ==
SPENS' most famous residents are basketball's KK Vojvodina Srbijagas (participating in Basketball League of Serbia) and volleyball's OK Vojvodina.

In 1987, Spens hosted basketball's European Cup Winners' Cup Final in which Cibona Zagreb defeated Scavolini Pesaro 89–74.

The venue received its biggest media exposure when it hosted round-robin action of EuroBasket 2005 in group D which consisted of Spain, Latvia, Israel and host country Serbia and Montenegro. For this occasion, SPENS underwent major renovation that included improvements to building's technological capabilities, overhaul of its media center and addition of two video boards – one on each end of the main hall.

The arena hosted the Group C (group stage) of and the Group II of the main round of the 2012 European Men's Handball Championship, which featured national teams of Spain, Croatia, France, Hungary, Slovenia and Iceland .

Since volleyball is very popular in Novi Sad, Serbia men's national volleyball team often plays its FIVB World League home matches in SPENS, as well as its friendly warm-up games.

== 2026 Tony Cetinski concert controversy ==
In March 2026, Croatian singer Tony Cetinski cancelled a scheduled concert at the SPENS sports and business centre in Novi Sad, Serbia. The cancellation followed criticism from some Croatian veterans' organizations, which alleged that the venue had been used as a detention site for Croats during the Yugoslav Wars of the 1990s. Cetinski stated that he regretted having previously performed at the venue and indicated that he would likely not perform in Novi Sad again.

Shortly afterwards, the Croatian Association of Prisoners in Serbian Concentration Camps (Hrvatsko društvo logoraša srpskih koncentracijskih logora) updated its list of alleged detention sites from the Croatian War of Independence, adding the SPENS complex in Novi Sad, more than 30 years after the war. According to the organization, the inclusion was based on collected testimonies from witnesses.

Officials in Novi Sad rejected the allegations. The mayor of Novi Sad, Žarko Mićin, stated that claims describing the venue as a wartime detention facility were inaccurate and said the complex had served as a reception centre for refugees during the conflict. Similarly, Tomislav Žigmanov, Deputy Prime Minister of the Government of Vojvodina and president of the Democratic Alliance of Croats in Vojvodina (DSHV), said in an interview with regional broadcaster N1 that the venue had "certainly not been a concentration camp during the 1990s". The management of the SPENS centre also rejected the claims, stating that during the war years the facility had accommodated refugees from Croatia rather than detainees.

The dispute has been discussed in the broader historical context of population displacement during the war in Croatia, which led to the movement of large numbers of refugees and detainees across the region in the early 1990s.

== Gallery ==
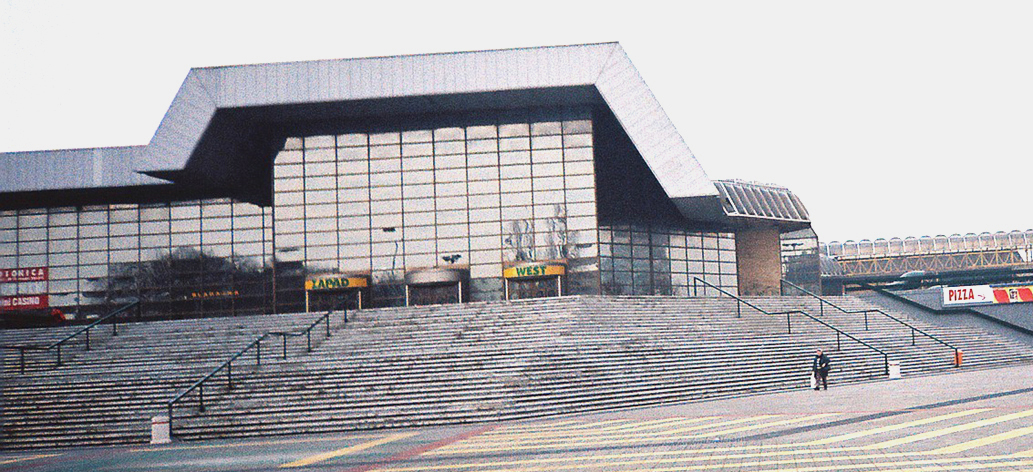
SPENS sports center from outside

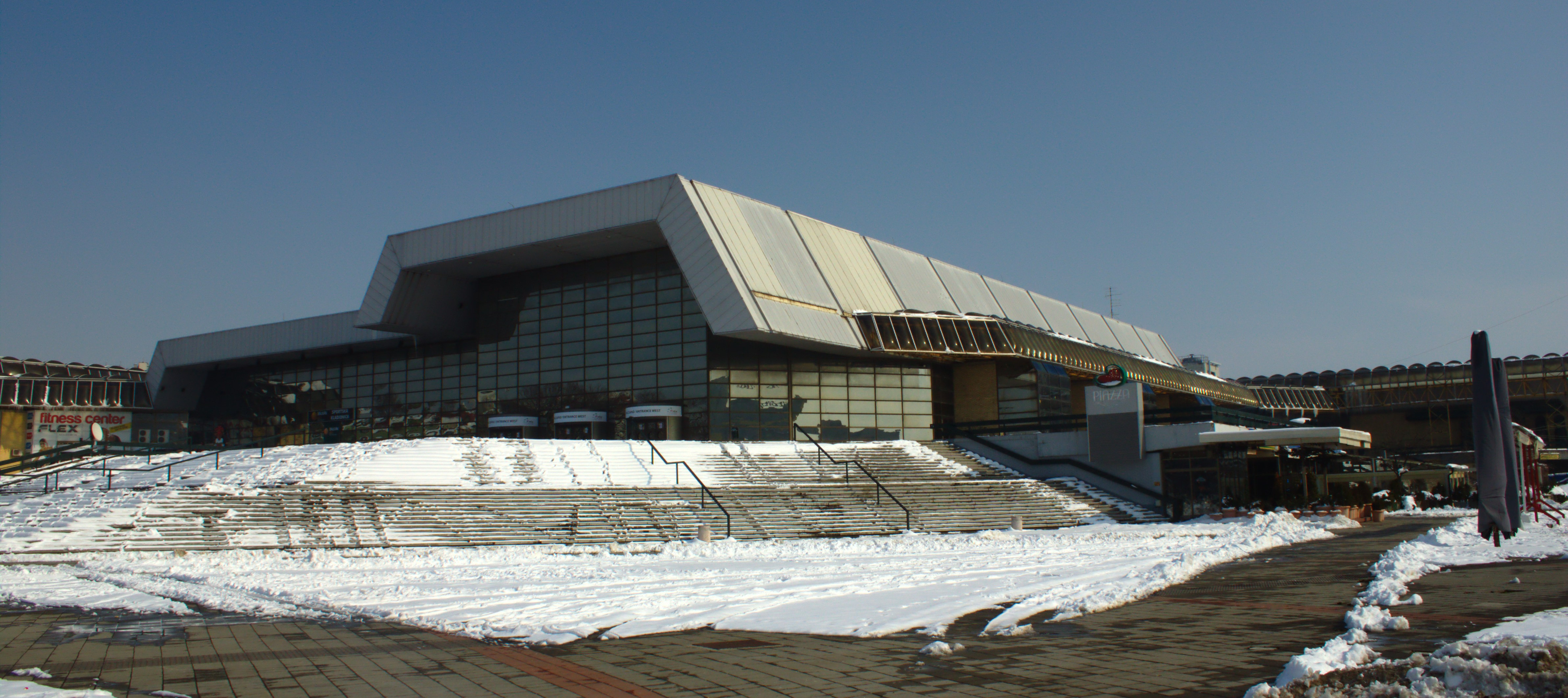
SPENS in winter

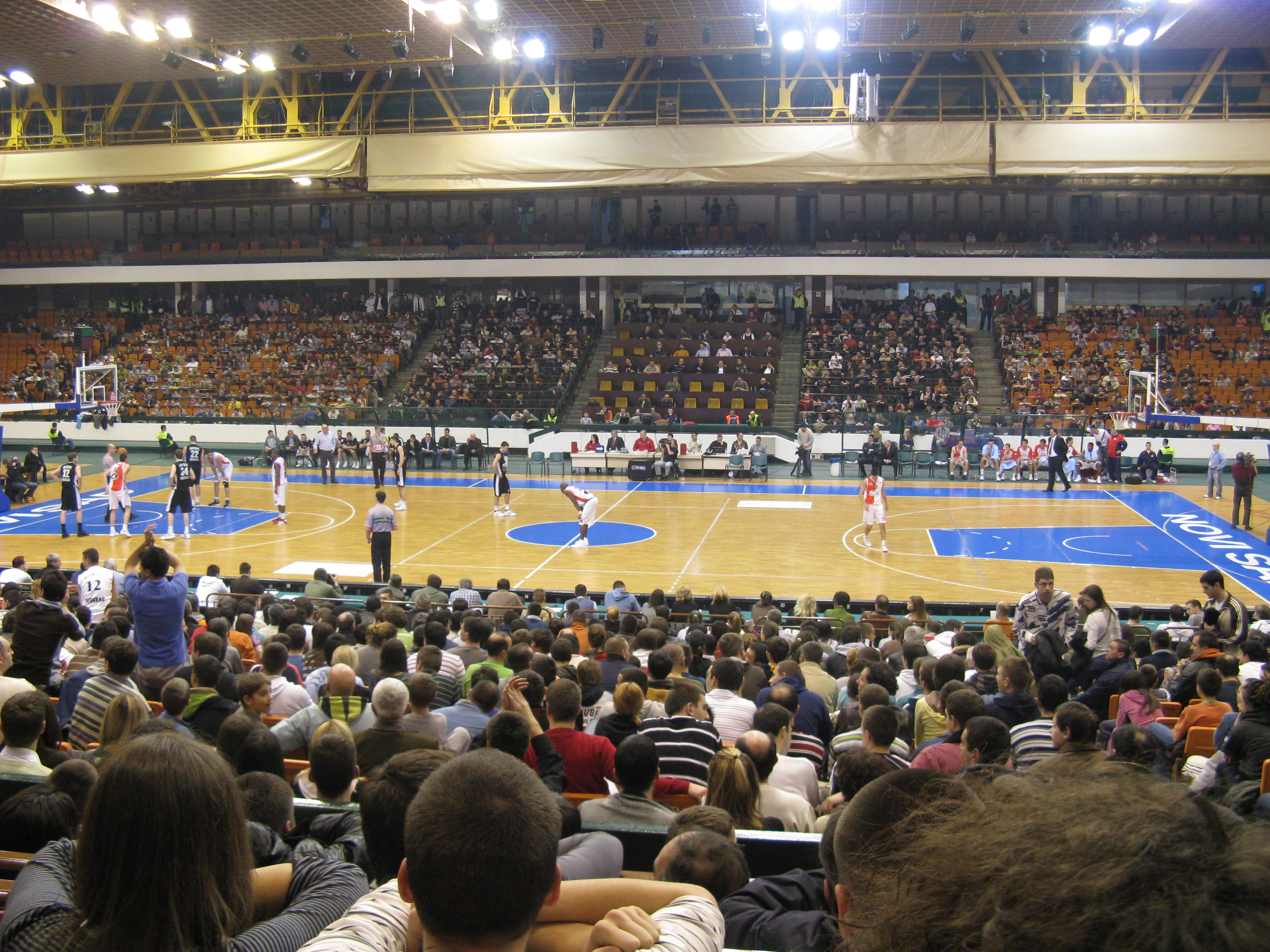
SPENS main hall during basketball game

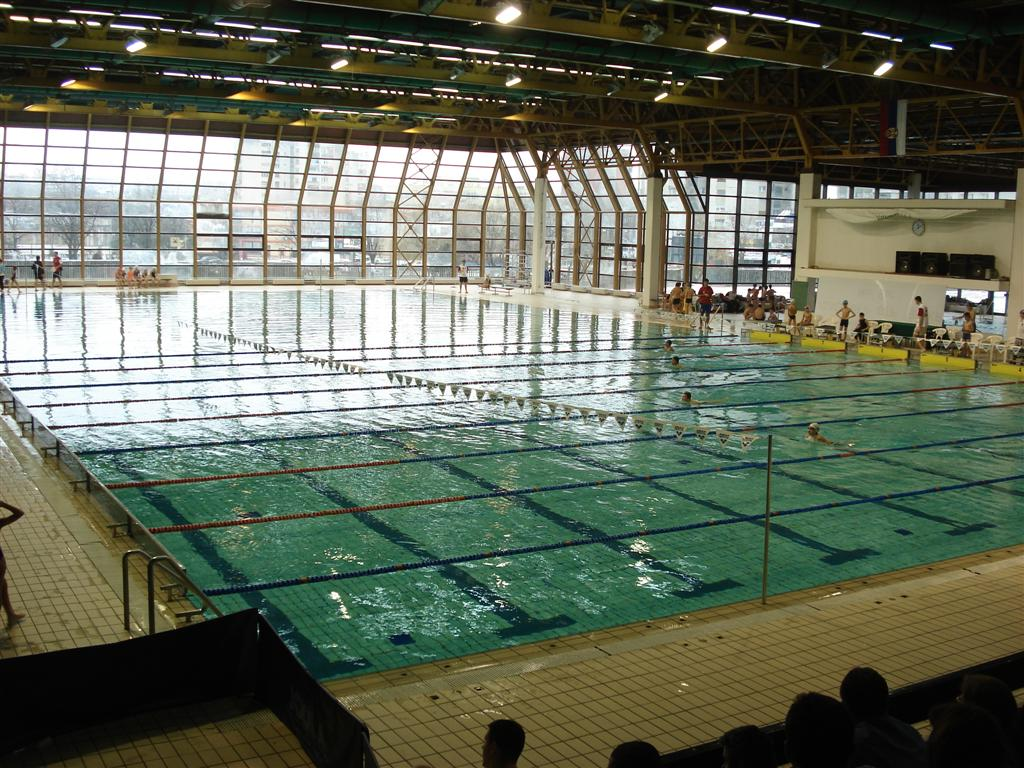
SPENS main swimming pool

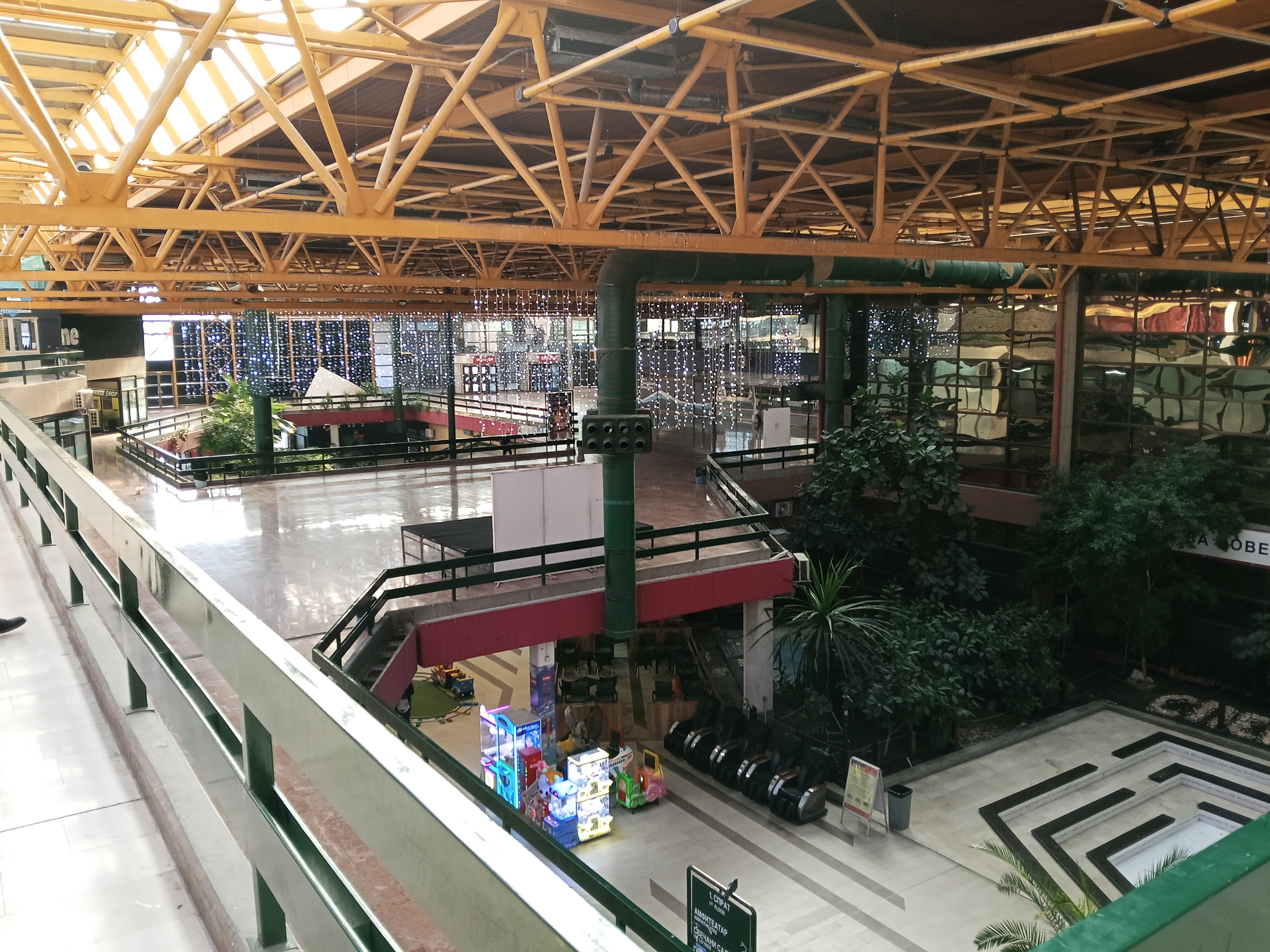
SPENS interior

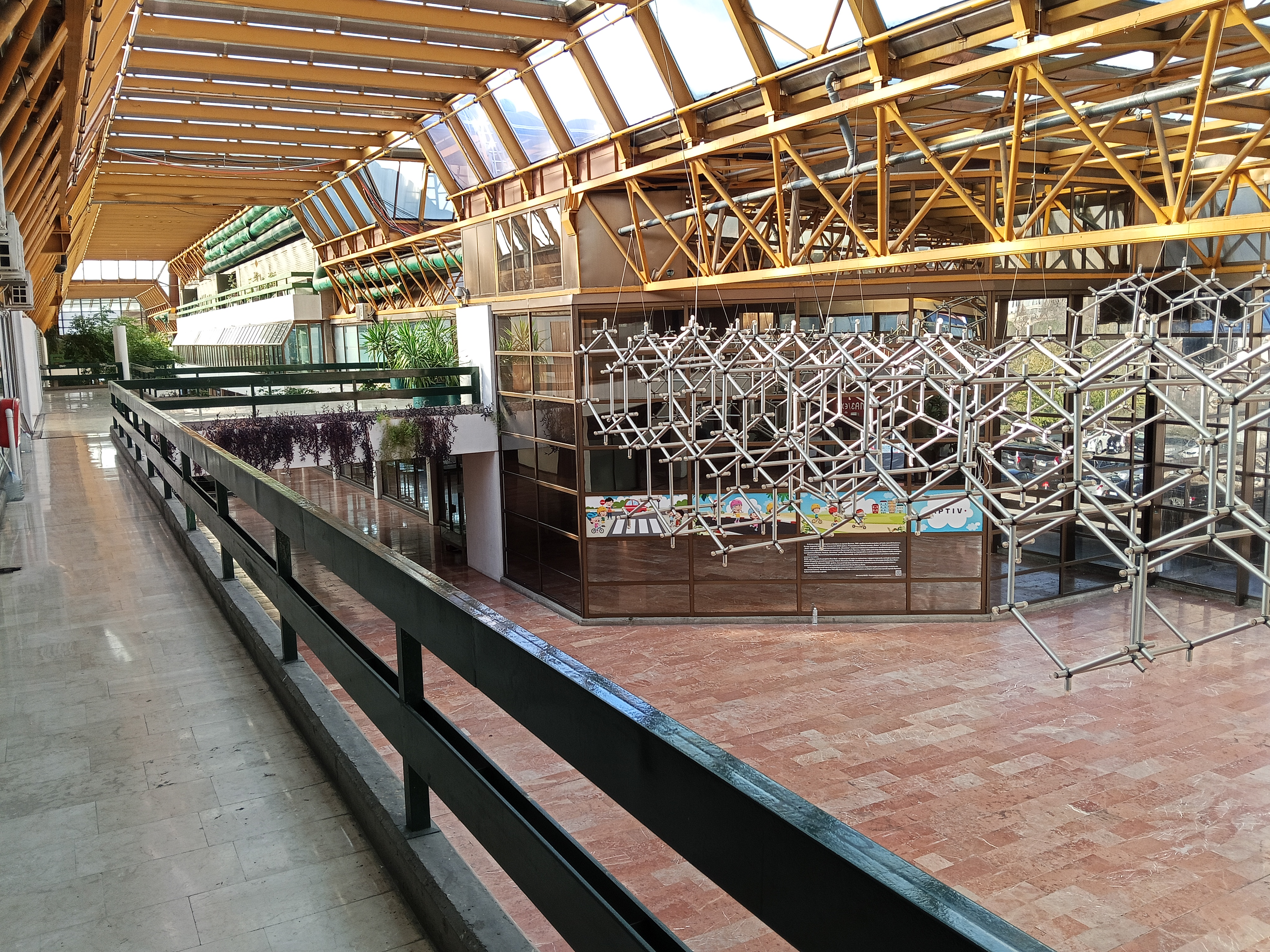
Hallway in SPENS

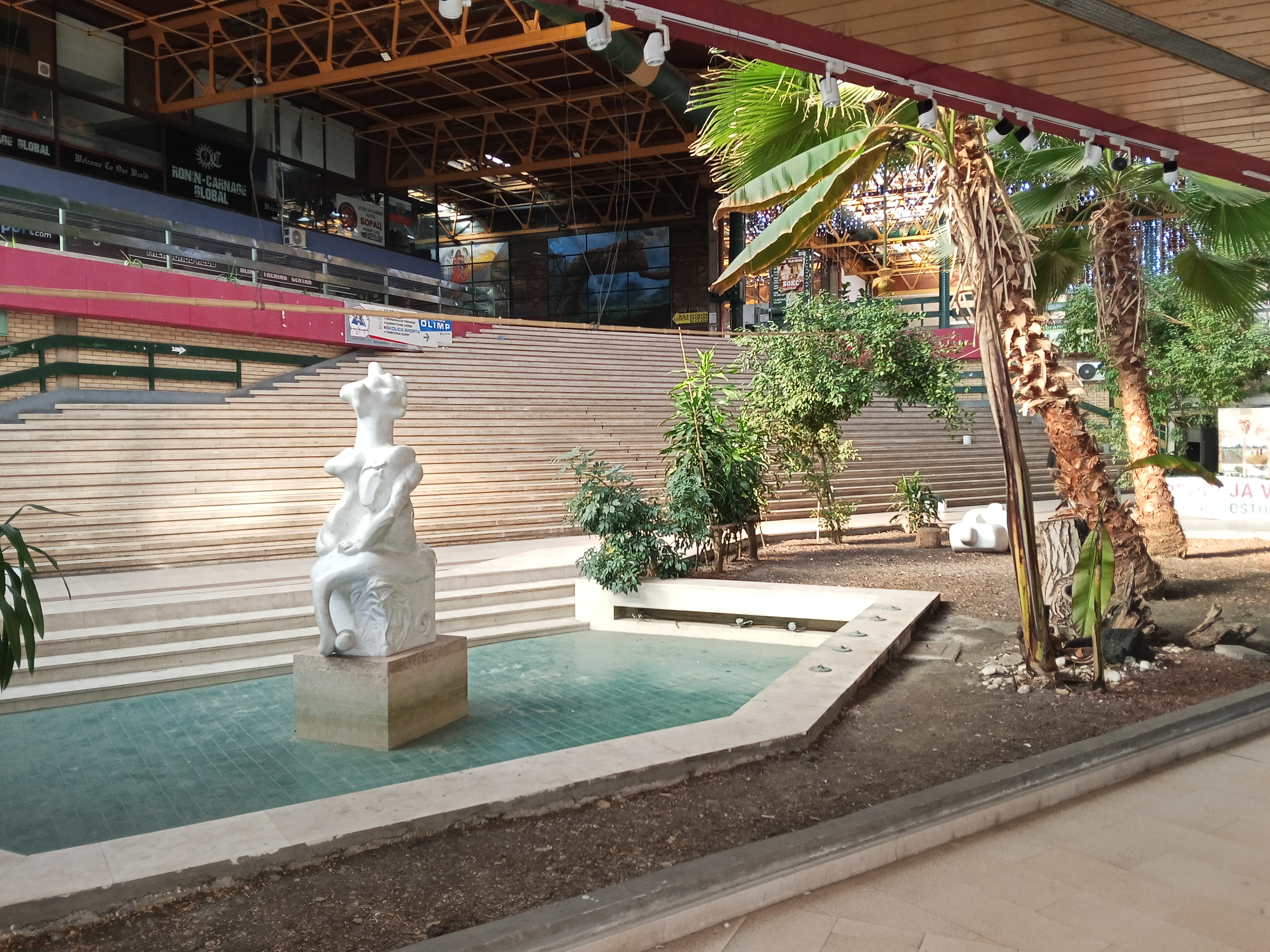
SPENS interior

== Concerts and events ==
In addition to sporting events, SPENS is often used as a venue for concerts, film premieres, conventions, etc. The first ever concert held at SPENS was of pop-rock band Sedmorica mladih, drawing a crowd of 5,000 people. Some of the other concerts have been:

List of concerts and events

1980s

- 6 December 1988 – Riblja Čorba (Priča o ljubavi obično ugnjavi Tour)

1990s

- 3 December 1993 – 1st Koncert godine (Električni Orgazam, EKV, Van Gogh, Atheist Rap, Plejboj)
- 5 May 1994 – Riblja Čorba (Zbogom, Srbijo Tour)
- 24 December 1994 – 2nd Koncert godine (Električni Orgazam, Zabranjeno Pušenje, Van Gogh, Deca Loših Muzičara, Atheist Rap, Ritam Nereda, Plejboj, Love Hunters, Generacija Bez Budućnosti)
- 22 December 1995 – 3rd Koncert godine (Riblja Čorba, Oružjem Protivu Otmičara, Atheist Rap)
- 23 December 1995 – 3rd Koncert godine (Van Gogh, Ritam Nereda, Rambo Amadeus, Goblini, Svarog)
- 27 December 1996 – 4th Koncert godine (Zabranjeno Pušenje, Veliki Prezir, Goblini, Eva Braun, Bjesovi)
- 28 December 1996 – 4th Koncert godine (Ritam Nereda, Partibrejkers, Oružjem Protivu Otmičara, Love Hunters, Generacija Bez Budućnosti)
- 21 February 1997 – Riblja Čorba
- 5 December 1997 – 5th Koncert godine (Bajaga i Instruktori, Love Hunters, Električni Orgazam, Generacija 5, Plejboj, Kristali, Zbogom Brus Li, Veliki Prezir, Muve)
- 6 December 1997 – 5th Koncert godine (Riblja Čorba, Partibrejkers, Van Gogh, Ritam Nereda, Goblini, Sunshine, Block Out, Generacija Bez Budućnosti, Six Pack, NBG)
- 11 December 1998 – 6th Koncert godine (Van Gogh, Ritam Nereda, Partibrejkers, Dža ili Bu, Darkwood Dub, Atheist Rap, Mravi)
- 12 December 1998 – 6th Koncert godine (Zabranjeno Pušenje, Sunshine, Orthodox Celts, Love Hunters, Kanda, Kodža i Nebojša, Generacija Bez Budućnosti, Eyesburn, Eva Braun)
- 17 December 1999 – 7th Koncert godine (Van Gogh, Love Hunters, Orthodox Celts, Block Out, Korozija, Zbogom Brus Li, Simić kvartet, Muve)
- 18 December 1999 – 7th Koncert godine (Partibrejkers, Sunshine, Ritam Nereda, Atheist Rap, Prljavi Inspektor Blaža i Kljunovi, Urgh!, 357, S.M.F., Vrisak Generacije)

2000s

- 8 December 2000 – 8th Koncert godine (Partibrejkers, Sunshine, Love Hunters, Prljavi Inspektor Blaža i Kljunovi, Orthodox Celts, Negative, Kanda, Kodža i Nebojša, Goblini, Džukele 357, Agenda)
- 9 December 2000 – 8th Koncert godine (KUD Idijoti, Ritam Nereda, Monetarni Udar, Atheist Rap, Obojeni Program, Eyesburn, Darkwood Dub, Direktori, Vrisak Generacije, S.M.F.)
- 15 December 2001 – 9th Koncert godine (Ritam Nereda, Obojeni Program, Love Hunters, Eyesburn, Bjesovi)
- 12 January 2002 – Kosheen
- 18 May 2002 – Riblja Čorba
- 20 December 2002 – 10th Koncert godine (Vrisak Generacije, Doghouse)
- 21 December 2002 – 10th Koncert godine (Beogradski Sindikat, Darkwood Dub, Eyesburn, Let 3, Rambo Amadeus, Ritam Nereda, Vroom)
- 23 September 2006 – Bajaga i Instruktori
- 26 November 2009 – Riblja Čorba (small hall)
- 28 November 2009 – Piloti
- 12 December 2009 – Van Gogh

2010s

- 23 April 2010 – Crvena Jabuka
- 11 December 2010 – 11th Koncert godine (Pekinška Patka, Ritam Nereda, Atheist Rap, Bjesovi, Dubioza Kolektiv, Lollobrigida, S.A.R.S., Svi na pod!, Overdrive)
- 17 December 2010 – Parni Valjak
- 8 April 2011 – Manu Chao (small hall)
- 1 October 2011 – Gibonni
- 22 October 2011 – Riblja Čorba (small hall)
- 5 November 2011 – Aca Lukas
- 11 December 2011 – 12th Koncert godine (Partibrejkers, Eyesburn, Love Hunters, Deca Loših Muzičara, Dža ili Bu, Goblini, Ritam Nereda, Zbogom Brus Li, Sunshine, Kolaps)
- 21 December 2011 – Zdravko Čolić
- 8 March 2012 – Tony Cetinski
- 5 April 2012 – Miroslav Ilić
- 6 April 2012 – Kerber
- 19 April 2012 – Ana Bekuta
- 27 April 2012 – Dino Merlin
- 12 May 2012 – Jelen Top 10 Turneja (Eyesburn, Kanda Kodža i Nebojša, Obojeni Program, Let 3, Darkwood Dub, Sharks, Snakes & Planes)
- 25 May 2012 – Parni Valjak (unplugged concert)
- 8 November 2012 – Aca Lukas (opening act: Marina Visković, guest: Nebojša Vojvodić)
- 16 November 2012 – YU Grupa (small hall)
- 29 November 2012 – Partibrejkers (opening act: Dža ili Bu) (small hall)
- 22 December 2012 – 13th Koncert godine (Hladno Pivo, Dubioza Kolektiv, Ritam Nereda, Atheist Rap, Eyesburn, Block Out, Orthodox Celts, Sve Barabe, S.A.R.S.)
- 8 March 2013 – Tozovac (guests: Ana Bekuta, Ekstra Nena, Garavi Sokak)
- 23 March 2013 – Beogradski Sindikat
- 10 May 2013 – Riblja Čorba (originally scheduled for Petrovaradin Fortress) (small hall)
- 18 October 2013 – Severina Vučković
- 8 November 2013 – Aca Lukas
- 22 November 2013 – Ceca Ražnatović (Poziv Tour)
- 23 November 2013 – Ceca Ražnatović
- 21 December 2013 – 14th Koncert godine (Hladno Pivo, Partibrejkers, Eyesburn, Električni Orgazam, Bjesovi, Obojeni Program, Kanda, Kodža i Nebojša, Six Pack, Brkovi, Feud)
- 27 December 2013 – Bajaga i Instruktori
- 25 January 2014 – Exit: Back to the Future (Bad Copy, Eyesburn, Kanda Kodža i Nebojša, Lollobrigida, Love Hunters, Roni Size, S.A.R.S., Svi na Pod!)
- 14 February 2014 – Lepa Brena
- 8 March 2014 – Doris Dragović (small hall)
- 16 April 2014 – Parni Valjak
- 13 December 2014 – 15th Koncert godine (Dubioza Kolektiv, S.A.R.S., Bad Copy, Hornsman Coyote, Goblini, Marčelo, Škrtice, Prljavi Inspektor Blaža i Kljunovi, Iskaz, Sopot, Grate)
- 13 March 2015 – Vojislav Šešelj (political rally after Šešelj's release from the Hague Tribunal.)
- 11 April 2015 – Green Bass Festival (Who See, Sajsi MC, Fox & Tatula, Billy9)
- 6 November 2015 – Aca Lukas
- 12 December 2015 – 16th Koncert godine (Partibrejkers, Hladno Pivo, Darkwood Dub, Goblini, Ritam Nereda, Orthodox Celts, Artan Lili, Piknik, Ničim Izazvan, Mortal Kombat)
- 26 December 2015 – Zdravko Čolić
- 2 April 2016 – YU Grupa (small hall)
- 17 April 2016 – Tony Cetinski
- 12 November 2016 – Ceca Ražnatović
- 10 December 2016 – 17th Koncert godine (Van Gogh, Ritam Nereda, Urban & 4, Bjesovi, Direktori, Bjesovi, Kolja i Grobovlasnici, Irie FM, Hadži Prodane Duše, Čovek Vuk)
- 19 January 2017 – Đorđe Balašević
- 14 February 2017 – Hari Mata Hari
- 9 December 2017 – 18th Koncert godine (Dubioza Kolektiv, YU Grupa, Atheist Rap, Obojeni Program, Kanda, Kodža i Nebojša, Repetitor, Gift, Kralj Čačka, Viva Vops)
- 19 January 2018 – Đorđe Balašević
- 14 February 2018 – Saša Matić
- 8 March 2018 – Gibonni
- 17 March 2018 – Sergej Ćetković (small hall)
- 13 April 2018 – Hari Mata Hari
- 28 April 2018 – 'Technasia Green Love' (Ilija Djoković, Andrew Meller, Tijana Kabić)

== See also ==
- List of indoor arenas in Serbia

Preceded by PalaMaggiò; Castel Morrone	Cup Winners' Cup; Final Venue; 1987	Succeeded by Palais des Sports; Grenoble
Preceded by Alexandreio Melathron; Thessaloniki	FIBA U-19 World Championship; Final Venue; 2007	Succeeded by Eventfinda Stadium; Auckland
