= Korak napred 2 koraka nazad =

Compilation album by Various artists
- Released: 6 December 1999
- Recorded: February 1998, March 1999, Akademija studio, Belgrade; February 1999, M studio, Novi Sad; February, September 1999, Music Factory studio, Belgrade
- Genres: Brit Pop, pop rock, dub, alternative rock, hardcore punk, reggae, indie rock, acoustic music, Funk, electronic music
- Length: 38:24
- Labels: B92; CD 002/MC002
- Producer: Velja Mijanović

Korak napred 2 koraka nazad (A Step Forward 2 Steps Backwards) is a various artists cover album, featuring nine Serbian bands performing cover versions of the popular Yugoslav rock songs, released in 1999. The album was intended to be released for the 10th anniversary of the Radio B92, however, before the album release, the station was taken over by the government. Nevertheless, the compilation was released.

== Track listing ==
Korak napred 2 koraka nazad
No.	Title	Performer	Length
1.	"Ne dozvoli" ("Do not Allow"; Originally performed by Cacadou Look)	Eva Braun	4:47
2.	"Šejn" ("Shane", originally performed by Haustor)	Eyesburn	5:02
3.	"Zaboravit ću sve" ("I Will Forget Everything"; originally performed by Fit)	Popcycle	4:45
4.	"Manitua mi" ("I swear to Manitu", originally performed by Disciplina Kičme)	Kanda, Kodža i Nebojša	4:13
5.	"Okean" ("The Ocean"; originally performed by La Strada)	Veliki Prezir	4:25
6.	"Baby, baby" (Originally performed by VIS Simboli)	Kristali	2:53
7.	"Devojka iz drugog sveta" ("A Girl from Another World"; originally performed by Robna Kuća)	Neočekivana Sila Koja Se Iznenada Pojavljuje i Rešava Stvar	4:41
8.	"Sad se jasno vidi" ("Now It's Clearly Visible"; originally performed by Šarlo Akrobata)	Plejboj	5:22
9.	"Đavoli" ("Devils"; originally performed by Đorđe Marjanović)	Jarboli	2:16

== Additional personnel ==
- Škart — album cover [design]
- Velja Mijanović — producer, engineer [post-producer], mastered by
