= Neočekivana Sila Koja Se Iznenada Pojavljuje i Rešava Stvar =

Neočekivana sila koja se iznenada pojavljuje i rešava stvar
- Also known as: Neočekivana Sila, Sila
- Origin: Belgrade, Serbia
- Genres: Alternative rock, electronica, experimental rock, trip hop
- Years active: 1997 – present
- Labels: B92
- Members: Boris Mladenović; Nemanja Aćimović; Vladimir Đorđević
- Past members: Goran Nikolić; Zlatko Veljović; Srđan Jerotijević; Oliver Nektarijević
- Website: Official Myspace

Neočekivana sila koja se iznenada pojavljuje i rešava stvar (Serbian Cyrillic: Неочекивана сила која се изненада појављује и решава ствар; translated as An Unexpected Force That Suddenly Appears and Settles the Matter) is a Serbian alternative rock/experimental music supergroup from Belgrade.

== History ==
=== 1990s ===
The supergroup was formed in December 1997 by the musicians active in notable Belgrade alternative rock bands, guitarists Vladimir Đorđević (a former Klajberi and Jazzwah member) and Goran Nikolić "Orge" (a former TV Moroni, Džambasovi and Nosorog member), drummer Nemanja Aćimović (Jarboli member), bassist Zlatko Veljović "Laki" (a former Džambasovi and Gori Škola member) and vocalist Oliver Nektarijević (Kanda, Kodža i Nebojša member). The band got the name by a definition for the term Deus ex machina, found in Milan Vujaklija's dictionary of foreign terms.

Having numerous club performances, the band had quickly drawn attention of the public to themselves. This was achieved with the fact that their every live appearance was different, due to improvisations and the musical style, featuring a combination of diverse musical influences, including breakbeat, trip hop, dub, rock and dance music. The selected recordings from their performances were remixed in the studio by Boris Mladenović, Vladimir Đorđević, Nenad Branković and Goran Vukojčić, and released independently by the band themselves on compact disc and cassette during the autumn of 1999. The self-titled album was entirely written by the band themselves, and the song "The Spirit of God" featured sampled recordings of the Baby Kain song "Feel This".

During the same year, with the Ljudmila Stratimirović Hat Theater, the band had a successful tour of Slovenia, and on Spring of the following year, the band performed in Zagreb and Ljubljana on the Druga Godba festival. In the meantime, the band appeared on the various artists cover album Korak napred 2 koraka nazad (A Step Forward 2 Steps Backwards), released by B92 in order to celebrate its 10th anniversary. The band appeared on the compilation with a cover version of the Robna Kuća track "Devojka iz drugog sveta" ("A Girl from Another World"), originally released in 1990, featuring the sampled tracks of the original vocalist Darko Matković.

=== 2000s ===
In February 2000, the band independently released their second album Hard To Dig It!, coproduced by the band with Boris Mladenović. The material featured lyrics entirely written in English language, and unlike its predecessor, was entirely a studio effort. During the same year, the band appeared on another B92 various artists compilation, Ring Ring 99 - Around the World, with a live version of the song "Proces" ("Process"), recorded on May 16, 1998, at the band performance on Ring Ring festival in Belgrade. At the time, the band live appearances started to feature the DJs Yu Ninja and Boža Podunavac.

In 2001, the band appeared on the Munje! movie soundtrack with the theme "Disaster", and the song "Bullet Proof (Remix Cycle 99)", appeared on the Apsolutnih 100 (The Absolute 100) movie soundtrack. The band also recorded music for the Korak dalje (A Step Further) theater play by Bojana Mladenović. At the time, the band started preparing their third studio album, recorded without vocalist Nektarijević who left the band. Sunca (The Suns), produced by Dušan Kojić "Koja", featuring Boris Mladenović on sampler as the official band member, composed mainly of instrumental tracks. Guest appearances featured Sonja Lončar (keyboards), Dušan Petrović (saxophone), Nataš Perazić (flute), Dejan Utvar (djembe).

The lineup performed until 2007, when Goran Nikolić and Zlatko Veljović left the band, and the band has since remained a trio, featuring Vladimir Đorđević (guitar, synthesizer), Boris Mladenović (bass guitar, synthesizer, samples) and Nemanja Aćimović (drums). In October 2011, the band performed in the club Gun in Belgrade, the performance featuring DJ Boža Podunavac and Nektarijević. It was the band's first concert with Nektarijević after ten years.

== Discography ==
=== Studio albums ===
- Neočekivana Sila Koja Se Iznenada Pojavljuje i Rešava Stvar (1999)
- Hard To Dig It! (2000)
- Sunca (2002)

=== Other appearances ===
- "Devojka iz drugog sveta" (Korak napred 2 koraka nazad; 1999)
- "Proces" (Ring Ring 99 - Around the World; 2000)
- "Disaster" (Muzika iz filma 'Munje' ; 2001)
- "Bullet Proof (Remix Cycle 99)" (Apsolutnih 100; 2001)
- "Espadrile smrti" (Čuvaj se Sinjske ruke!; 2004)
- "Ruski gruv" (Sigurno najbolji; 2006)
