= How Much for Freedom? =

Studio album by Eyesburn
- Released: 2005
- Recorded: M studio, Novi Sad, May 2005
- Genres: Hardcore punk, reggae
- Label: PGP RTS
- Producer: Boban Milunović

How Much for Freedom? is the fourth full-length studio album released by the Serbian hardcore/reggae band Eyesburn.

This is the first album to feature Dusan Petrović on saxophone and Vukasin Marković on Vocals and Trombone and only to feature Dalibor Vučić. It is also the only album recorded without Vladimir Lazić on bass.

Album was originally recorded in May 2005 and was supposed to be released in September, but due to problems with labels, the release was postponed to December. Album was released both in Serbia and Montenegro and Austria.

In January 2006, song "Eyes Are the Lights" was released as a first single from this album with an official music video. So Much Trouble in the World also got its official music video in 2007, while a video was recorded for "Like Tomorrow Never Come", but was never released officially. (Band published this video couple years later on YouTube).

The band promoted How Much For Freedom in its promotional tour in March/April 2006.

== Track listing ==
1. "Higher Region"
2. "Injustice"
3. "Soul Reaches to the Sun"
4. "Terrorvision"
5. "In War with the System"
6. "Life"
7. "So Much Trouble in the World" (Music By, Lyrics By – Bob Marley)
8. "The More U Tell Dem"
9. "Eyes Are the Lights"
10. "Like Tomorrow Never Come"
11. "See You There"
12. "Power of Mind"

== Personnel ==
=== Eyesburn ===
- Nemanja Kojić - Vocals, Guitar & Trombone
- Aleksandar Petrović - Drums & Percussion
- Dušan Petrović - Saxophone
- Vukasin Marković - Trombone & Vocals
- Dalibor Vučić - Bass & Clarinet

==== Production ====
- Slobodan Milutinović - Producing, Recording & Mastering
- Darko Varga - Recording assistant
- Jan Šaš - Recording assistant
- Horst Pfaffelmayer - Mastering
- Björn Warns - Mixing
- Sven Kohlwage - Mixing

==== Other Credits ====
- Borivoje Kojić - Artwork
- Cover design - Nenad Živić
- Zoran Đuroski - Engineering (Live Sound)
- Oliver Bunić - Photography

== Live ==
To this day, this album remains as one of the least played live, only behind Troops of Light (and Freedomized).

"Higher Region" was only used as a tape song, often used as an opener. It was last time used in 2020.

"The More U Tell Dem", also known as "Chant, Chant" was the first track from this album to be played live, being played in December 2003. Unlike the release version, a tease of song "Moses" (by Soulfly and Eyesburn) is played live during the bridge. It is the only song from this album that is still being played.

"Life" was played first time in 2004, and even though band went on a hiatus in 2007, it was still played often after reunion until 2014, when Dušan Petrović left the band.

"So Much Trouble in the World" was played first time during the promotional tour of "How Much For Freedom", and similarly to "Life", it remained on the set lists until 2014.

"Terrorvision" was played first time in 2005, but wasn't played after the promotional tour in 2006.

"Eyes Are the Lights" was played first time in 2004, although it had slightly different lyrics. It was never played after band's hiatus in 2007.

"See You There" was played first time during the promotional tour of "How Much For Freedom" and was played even after band's hiatus in 2011, until Aleksandar Petrović left the band for 7 years. It has never been played since.

"Injustice", "Soul Reaches to the Sun" and "In War With the System" were played first time during the promotional tour of "How Much For Freedom" and were never played after band went on a hiatus in 2007.

"Power of Mind" has never been played in its entirety, but, interestingly, lyrics of this song were used as an outro to song "Moses" during the 2004 European tour with Soulfly.
