= Bebić =

Bebić is a Croatian surname. Notable people with the surname include:

- Ana Bebić (born 1986), Croatian singer
- Luka Bebić (born 1937), Croatian politician
- Milivoj Bebić (born 1959), Croatian water polo player
- Toma Bebić (1935–1990), Croatian artist
