= Nikola Tomić =

Serbian composer, animator, and designer

- Born: Nikola Tomić; February 19, 1975 (age 51); Kragujevac, SFR Yugoslavia
- Occupations: Musician; Animator; Designer

YouTube information
- Channel: Nykk Deetronic
- Years active: 2007–present
- Genre: Nursery
- Subscribers: 2.19 million
- Views: 2.467 billion
- Last updated: 20 April 2026
- Website: deetronic.rs

Nikola Tomić (also known as Nykk Deetronic, born February 19, 1975 in Kragujevac) is a Serbian composer, multimedia designer, animator and web designer. He has created many popular animated cartoons for children such as We are chickens (Serbian: Mi smo pilići), Mommy Loves Baby (Serbian: Mama voli bebu) and Maxim's adventures (Serbian: Maksimove avanture). His YouTube channel is among one the most visited channels in the countries of former Yugoslavia. As of April 2026, he has garnered 2 million subscribers and over 2 billion views.

== YouTube channel ==
Tomić created his YouTube channel in 2007 as a personal portfolio. The channel remained relatively anonymous until 2011. The only video from that period with a significant view count was the Nyan Pig. Tomić's YouTube channel started to be recognized by a wider audience when he published the first version of his We are chickens nursery.

=== We are chickens ===
Tomić was a member of the team that developed the Facebook game Chicken lines (Serbian: Pilići), created by Nenad Hrnjak. Tomić made theme music for a Serbian version of the game, while the English theme was composed by Boris Mladenović from the Jarboli band.

In 2011, Tomić published his animated nursery We are chickens. He composed the music and animated the nursery, while the characters were designed by his cousin Dragan Tomić. The video become viral and contributed significantly to the popularity of his channel.

=== Maxim's adventures ===
Maxim's adventures (Serbian: Maksimove avanture) is a series of animated cartoons published first on Tomić's YouTube channel, and broadcast from September 10, 2016. on the first channel of Radio Television of Serbia.

Main characters are family members – daddy, mommy, and a little boy Maxim and their pet, a little dog called Masha. Characters are based on Tomić's own family members. Several theater plays based on Maxim's adventures were produced.

=== Mommy loves baby ===
Children's song Mommy loves baby (Serbian: Mama voli bebu) is Tomić's the most popular YouTube video with over 160 million views (July 2018). The song was made by chance, when Tomić's spouse Jelena sang a song to their son Maxim. Tomić recorded a song with his smartphone and in 2013. published a video. The song was sung by Jelena Kovačević. Later on, the song was adopted on Bosnian, Chinese, Italian and Spanish languages.

=== Brand ===
Mommy loves baby & Maxim's adventures is a brand and franchise used by Tomić for placement of products and services on the market, a business model already used by similar brands such as Masha and the Bear or Angry Birds.

- In 2016 Tomić and AdvanTec Group from Belgrade placed on the market puppets modelled after characters of daddy, mommy and Maxim.
- In 2017 a number of books was published in the serie Growing up with Maxim (Serbian: Odrastanje sa Maksimom):
  - Adventure in the ZOO (Serbian: Avantura u zoo vrtu) ISBN 978-86-10-01950-6
  - The first day in the kindergarten (Serbian: Prvi dan u vrtiću) ISBN 978-86-10-01929-2
  - But I'm afraid (Serbian: Ali ja se bojim) ISBN 978-86-10-01968-1
  - No no no and no (Serbian: Ne ne ne i ne) ISBN 978-86-10-01970-4
  - Adventure with letters (Serbian: Avantura sa slovima) ISBN 978-86-10-01953-7
  - I'm bored (Serbian: Dosadno mi je) ISBN 978-86-10-01969-8
  - Healthy snack (Serbian: Zdrava užina) ISBN 978-86-10-01926-1
  - That really isn't fair (Serbian: To stvarno nije fer) ISBN 978-86-10-01971-1
- In 2017 a kindergarten named Maksimove avanture was opened in Belgrade, Serbia.

== Controversy and legal issues ==
Tomić's YouTube channel already survived several legal attacks, based on copyright infringement and intellectual property, which caused temporary removal of Tomić's videos from YouTube on multiple occasions.

After We are chickens video, Tomić produced and published additional videos with the same characters, which in 2015 caused legal disagreements and copyright issues between Tomić, Nenad Hrnjak (author of Facebook game Chicken lines) and IDJVideos ltd. Tomić, Hrnjak i IDJVideos solved this problem in the manner that Tomić removed 7 controversial videos with Chickens from his channel, while Hrnjak in turn granted Tomić with free licence for Chickens usage in the remaining 11 videos.

In June 2017, Tomić's YouTube channel was attacked once again, this time by Advantec Group ltd. from Belgrade, with whom Tomić already had some previous business cooperation in toys distribution. On May 30, 2017 Advantec Group submitted a registration claim on Mama voli bebu – Maksimove avanture trademark. As a consequence, the Court in Serbia rendered a decision on preliminary injunction by which Nikola Tomić is forbidden to make publicly available all episodes of Maksim's adventures until the dispute is resolved in final instance.
