= Jarboli =

Serbian alternative rock band

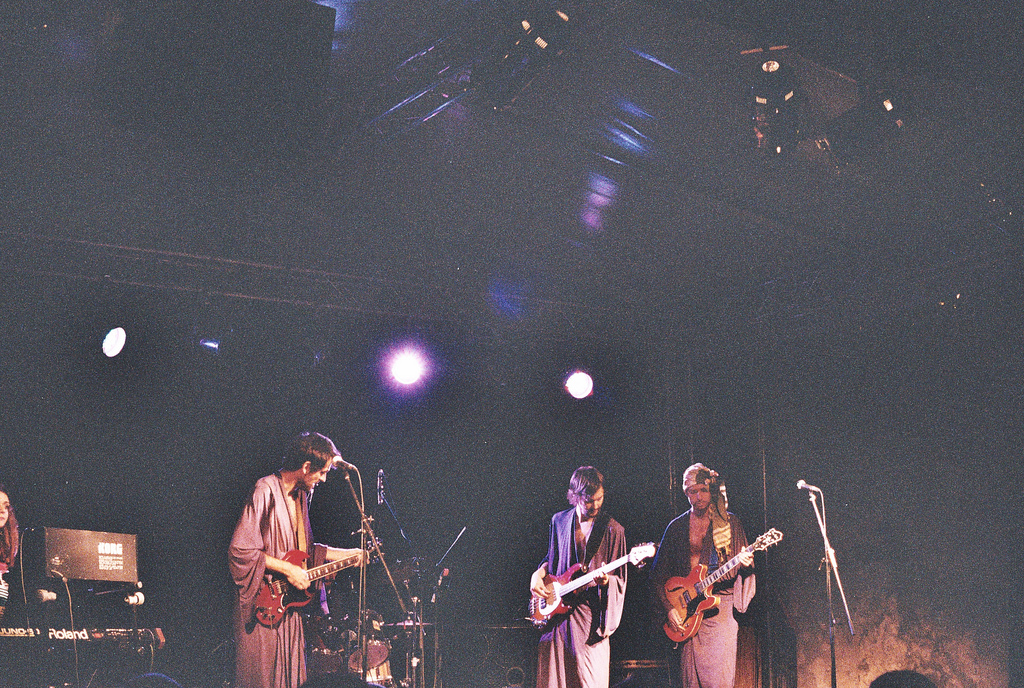
- Jarboli performing in 2010

Background information
- Also known as: Džo i Jarboli
- Origin: Belgrade, Serbia
- Genres: Alternative rock
- Years active: 1991–present
- Labels: B92, Beopolis, Circle Records, L.V.O. Records, Radio BOOM 93, Odličan Hrčak, Exit Music
- Members: Boris Mladenović; Daniel Kovač; Nemanja Aćimović; Sonja Lončar; Žolt Kovač

Jarboli (Serbian Cyrillic: Јарболи; trans. The Masts) is a Serbian alternative rock band from Belgrade.

== History ==
=== 1990s ===
The band was formed in 1991 by Daniel Kovač (guitar, vocals), Boris Mladenović (guitar, vocals), Žolt Kovač (bass guitar), and Nemanja Aćimović (drums) who, influenced by garage rock and punk rock, started to compose their own material and to perform in Belgrade clubs, mainly the club Bunker, Ljudmila Stratimirović fashion shows, and as a frequent opening act for Obojeni Program and Instant Karma. The performances featured strange stage decorations, costumes and behavior not typical for a rock band, which might be described as dadaistic. In 1993, they performed at the Palilula Culture Olympics as Džo i Jarboli (Joe and the Masts).

The following year, the band made studio recordings for the tracks "Industrija oko nas" ("The Industry around Us"), "Uticaj puteva na novi talas" ("The Influence of the Roads on New Wave"), "Ja opet biću tvoj" ("I Will Be Yours Again"), and "Da li u stvari ona nije bila oprezna?" ("Was She Actually Not Careful?") at the Belgrade Akademija studio.During the spring of 1996, the previously recorded material appeared on the compilation album Čizmanoga (literal translation for Bootleg), released independently by the band on compact cassette only in 50 copies. Beside the studio tracks, the compilation featured live recordings made at the Belgrade N.U. Božidar Adžija, KST club, and Radio B92. In 1997, the band performed at a festival held in the German city Erfurt.

Their debut studio album was intended to be officially released on March 24, 1999, however, due to the beginning of the NATO bombing of Yugoslavia on the very evening, the promotion was never held. A few days later, the government took over the Radio B92, thus all of the 2000 album copies were confiscated, only to be returned to the record label after the bombing ended. Dobrodošli (Welcome) featured the material written by Boris Mladenović and Daniel Kovač and produced by Goran Živković and Rikardo Bartez. In December of the same year, the band appeared on the various artists cover album Korak napred 2 koraka nazad (A step forward 2 steps backwards) with the cover version of the Đorđe Marjanović song "Đavoli" ("The Devils").

=== 2000s ===
In 2000, the band independently released an EP Samo ponekad (Just Occasionally), which beside the title track also featured three more songs recorded in home-made production. The following year Daniel Kovač went to serve the army and the vacant band member position was occupied by a being replaced by the keyboard player Sonja Lončar, who had previously worked with E-Play. On December 5, 2001, the band released their second studio album Suvišna sloboda (Sufficient Freedom), recorded at the Factory studio during April and May of the same year, featuring saxophone sections recorded by the former Plejboj and Eyesburn member Dušan Petrović and string sections arranged by Sonja Lončar. The following year, the band participated in the Milan Mladenović tribute album Kao da je bilo nekad... (Posvećeno Milanu Mladenoviću) (As If It Once Happened... (Dedicated to Milan Mladenović)) with the cover version of the song "Idemo" ("Let's Go")., originally released on the Ekatarina Velika 1991 studio album Dum dum (Bang Bang).

In 2003, the album Čizmanoga was reissued on CD by Beopolis and as bonus tracks appeared the band's string compositions and a cover of the starogradska muzika song "Tiho noći" ("Be Silent, Night"), featuring the lyrics written by poet Jovan Jovanović Zmaj. During the same year, the band released and a six-track EP Uslovna sloboda (Parole) through their own Odličan Hrčak independent record label, featuring guest appearances by Veliki Prezir frontman Vladimir Kolarić on backing vocals and the Horkešart choir. In 2005, the band released yet another EP, Jedan čovek jedna rezolucija (One Man One Resolution), featuring five tracks, four of which were recorded live on March 4, 2004 at the Belgrade SKC. The only studio track on the release, "Rezolucija UN" ("UN resolution"), was recorded in Aćimović's basement, Boris Mladenović's apartment, Vrbas studio Kombinat Rekord and the Belgrade Desanka Maksimović studio. The EP was distinguished as one of the best releases of the year 2005 according to the critics of the Serbian webzine Popboks.

The track "Rezolucija UN" was also included on the third studio album, Buđanje proleća (The Mildew of Spring), produced by Boris Mladenović. With the album release, the band established itself as supporters and headliners of the wave of Serbian alternative bands known as the New Serbian Scene with their independent record label Odličan Hrčak. The album was selected as the fourth best album of the year 2006 according to the Popboks critics and their concert held at the Belgrade SKC during the album promotional tour was voted as the best concert in 2006. During the same year, the band performed at the Rock 'n' Roll Škola manifestation. In 2008, the band performed at the annual Jelen Pivo Live festival and the following year they appeared at the Košutnjak Supernatural festival and the Novi Sad Exit festival. During 2009, the band started working on a new album, and the single "Podrška je važna" ("Support Is Important") appearing on the first place on the Jelen Top 10 list on October. The single was voted the fourteenth best single and fifth best music video of the year 2009 according to the critics of the webzine Popboks.

=== 2010s ===
On April 2, 2010, Buđanje proleća was reissued by Exit Music online record label for free digital download. At the beginning of 2011, the Popboks critics selected the best domestic albums released in the previous decade on which Suvišna sloboda appeared on the seventh and Buđanje proleća on the forty-third place.

In 2011, the band released their fourth studio album Zabava (Party) in mp3 format for free digital download through the Exit Music label and as a double LP through Odličan Hrčak, without releasing the album in CD format. The download version of Zabava was released on May 11, featuring thirteen songs, including the previously released single "Podrška je važna", recorded live in the controlled conditions of the Digimedia studio and produced by Boris Mladenović. In December 2012, the band held several multimedia actions. On December 6, they released eight-minute music video for the song "Ništa" ("Nothing"), directed by Rastko Petrović. On the same day, an exhibit of Srđan Veljović's photographs of the band, under the name Jarboli 1996 – Radovi u toku (Jarboli 1996 – Work in Progress) was opened in Student Cultural Center in Belgrade. On December 12, a retrospective of Jarboli videos was held in Student Cultural Center.

In April 2013, the band released the single "Zabluda" ("Misapprehension"), announcing their fifth studio album. In March 2014, the band released the live album, Podrška je važna (Support Is Important). The album was recorded in April 2013, on the band's concert in Božidarac club in Belgrade. The album was available for free listening on the band's Bandcamp page. In December 2015, the band released the second single from the upcoming album, "Mladost" ("Youth").

== Legacy ==
The lyrics the band's song "Glavu gore" ("Cheer Up") were featured in Petar Janjatović's book Pesme bratstva, detinjstva & potomstva: Antologija ex YU rok poezije 1967 - 2007 (Songs of Brotherhood, Childhood & Offspring: Anthology of Ex YU Rock Poetry 1967 – 2007).

== Discography ==
=== Studio albums ===
- Dobrodošli (1999)
- Suvišna sloboda (2001)
- Buđanje proleća (2006)
- Zabava (2011)
- Probaj golog muškarca (2024)

=== Live albums ===
- Podrška je važna (2014)

=== Compilation albums ===
- Čizmanoga (1996)

=== Extended plays ===
- Samo ponekad (2000)
- Uslovna sloboda (2003)
- Jedan čovek jedna rezolucija (2005)

=== Other appearances ===
- "Industrija" (Gruvanje Live Vol. 1; 1995)
- "Industrija oko nas" (Mi za mir; 1995)
- "Da li u stvari ona nije bila oprezna?" (Ovo je zemlja za nas?!?; 1997)
- "Đavoli" (Korak napred 2 koraka nazad; 1999)
- "08.02.1998." (Lepardov rep; 2000)
- "Idemo" (Kao da je bilo nekad... (Posvećeno Milanu Mladenoviću); 2002)
- "Glavu gore" (Rhythm changes; 2007)
