= Marko Vidojković =

Serbian writer

- Марко Видојковић
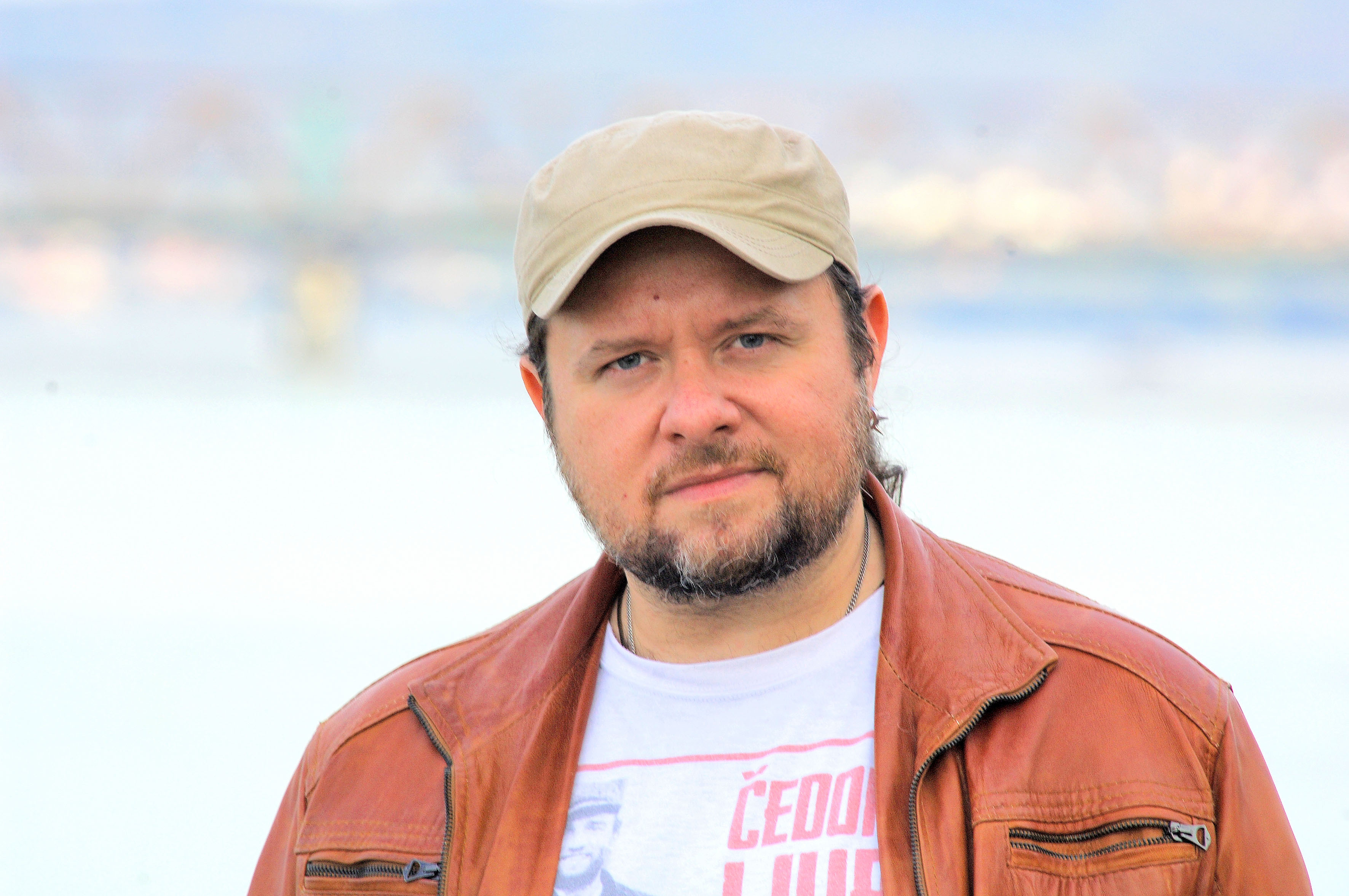
- Vidojković in 2021
- Born: 1 October 1975 (age 50); Belgrade, SFR Yugoslavia
- Education: Law studies, University of Belgrade
- Alma mater: University of Belgrade (Bachelor degree)
- Occupations: Writer, editor, columnist, activist, musician, TV and podcast host
- Spouse: Đurđija Vidojković
- Writing career
- Language: Serbian
- Notable works: Kandže; E baš vam hvala; Sve crvenkape su iste
- Notable awards: Vital award for the best book published in 2006; Kočić's Quill in 2005; Golden Bestseller in 2005; Hudi Macek Grossman Fantasy, Sci-Fi and Comic Festival award
- Website: www.markovidojkovic.rs

Marko Vidojković (born 1 October 1975) is Serbian novelist, activist, musician, columnist and TV anchor. He is best known for his novels: Kandže (The Claws), Sve crvenkape su iste (All Red Riding Hoods are the Same) and E, baš vam hvala (Thanks a lot).

He won the Vital Award for novel Sve crvenkape su iste in 2006; and Golden Bestseller, as well as Kočić's quill award, for his novel Kandže in 2005. He also won Grossman Fantasy, Sci-Fi and Comic Festival award Hudi Macek for his novel E bas vam hvala. His work has been translated to German, English, Macedonian, Bulgarian, Polish, Hungarian, Slovenian and Czech languages. He has also been published in Bosnia and Croatia. His first novel, Ples sitnih demona (The Dance of Small-Time Demons), was adapted for a theater play in 2010.

Vidojkovic was an editor for Maxim and Playboy magazines. He was a band member of The Goblins, Toxic Noise Team, On The Run, Snowdrop, Strap On, and Crveni vetar (Red wind).

He hosted the satirical talk show 390 stepeni (390 degrees) on ATV Banja Luka, and 400 stepeni (400 degrees) on TV Naša. He is a columnist for daily paper Danas, and co-host of podcast Dobar, Loš, Zao (The Good, The Bad, The Ugly) that airs on YouTube and on Nova S.

According to International PEN Center data for 2022, 2023, and 2024; Vidojkovic, whose life is under threat, is one of the 100 most endangered authors in the world. In February 2023, he was forced to flee Serbia. While in exile, he is continuing his work and digitally co-hosting DLZ podcast.

== Bibliography ==
- Ples sitnih demona (The Dance of Small-Time Demons, a novel) (Narodna knjiga, 2001, Samizdat B92, 2005, Laguna, 2019)
- Đavo je moj drug (The Devil Is a Friend of Mine, a novel) (Narodna knjiga, 2002, Samizdat, 2005, Laguna, 2015)
- Pikavci na plaži (Butts on the Beach, a novel) (Narodna knjiga, 2002, Laguna 2018)
- Kandže (The Claws, a novel) (Samizdat, 2004, Laguna, 2020)
- Sve crvenkape su iste (All Red Riding Hoods Are the Same, a novel) (Samizdat, 2006, Laguna, 2016)
- Bog ti pomogo ( May God Have Mercy on Your Soul, short stories collection) (Samizdat, 2007, Laguna, 2015)
- Hoću da mi se nešto lepo desi odmah (I Want Something Nice to Happen to Me Right Now, a novel) (Samizdat, 2009)
- Kandže 2 - Diler i smrt (The Claws 2 - The Pusher and Death, a novel) (Rende, 2012, Laguna, 2020)
- Urednik (The Editor, a novel) (Laguna, 2014)
- Priče s Dijagnozom (Stories with Diagnosis, short stories) (Laguna, 2015)
- E baš vam hvala, (Thanks a Lot, a novel) (Laguna, 2017)
- Đubre, (Trash, a novel) (Laguna, 2020)
- Kovid 19+ (Covid 19+, short stories collection) (Laguna, 2021)
- Povrede na radu (Workplace injuries, short stories collection) (Laguna, 2024)
- Četres' prva: E baš vam hvala 2 (1941: Thanks a lot 2, a novel) (Laguna, 2026)
