= The Kuguars =

Rock band

Background information
- Origin: Belgrade, Serbia, FR Yugoslavia
- Genres: Comedy rock
- Years active: 1997–2001
- Labels: Metropolis Records
- Past members: Dragan Jovanović; Dejan Matić; Nikola Ðuričko; Rade Marković; Boris Milivojević; Bogdan Diklić; Papa Nick; Tibor Tot

The Kuguars (a transliterated pun for The Cougars) were a successful short-lived Serbian comedy rock band from Belgrade, mainly consisting of famous Serbian actors. Formed in 1997, the band released two albums featuring humorous songs, before disbanding in 2001.

== History ==
The band, mainly consisting of actors, was formed in 1997 by Dragan Jovanović (vocals), Dejan Matić (triangle, vocals), Nikola Ðuričko (guitar, vocals), Rade Marković (guitar, vocals), Boris Milivojević (bass guitar), Bogdan Diklić (drums), Papa Nick (percussion) and Tibor Tot (percussion), intending to perform and record music for theatre plays. The band got the name by the theatre troupe called Kuguari which the band members were a part of, named after the state of the dressing room the actors used during the rehearsals which reminded them of a den occupied by the cougars.

The debut album, released without much commercial ambition, consisted of the material recorded as a soundtrack for the Smešna strana muzike (A Funny Side of Music) theatre play. Most of the tracks on the album were witty cover versions of either rock hits, including the Deep Purple song "Smoke on the Water", featuring the lyrics from the children poem "Leptiriću šareniću" written by Jovan Jovanović Zmaj, "Raw Hide", renamed to "Gipsy Hide", or their interpretations of children songs, including "Ocka" and "Kad si srećan". The album also featured the hit songs "Zidareva ljubav", a turbo folk parody song, for which the song lyrics were written by the director Srđan Dragojević, and the soccer anthem "Dejo" (a cover of Harry Belafonte song "Day-O (The Banana Boat Song)"), dedicated to the member of the Yugoslav national soccer team Dejan Savićević.

The second studio album, Open de dor (transliteration for Open the Door) presented the band in a more serious manner, but nonetheless featured a pornographic parody of the ABBA track "Chiquitita", a cover of the Miroslav Ilić hit "Ja zavoleh devojku iz grada", with lyrics in English language entitled "I Was Born", and a cover of "Tomorrow Belongs to Me" from the Cabaret movie soundtrack, with lyrics in Serbian entitled "Budućnost je samo za nas". The album also featured a cover of the blues standard "Fever" with lyrics in Serbian renamed to "Zima", which became a nationwide hit, and the a cappella version of the Bijelo Dugme song "Ne spavaj mala moja muzika dok svira", for which the lead vocals were provided by Bogdan Diklić, recorded to resemble the version Diklić had sung in the 1979 film Nacionalna klasa.

On November 30, 1999, the percussionist Tibor Tot died in a car accident and the band ceased to exist.

== Discography ==
- Smešna strana muzike (1998)
- Open de dor (1999)
