= Sunshine (Serbian band) =

Serbian hip hop group

- Origin: Belgrade, Serbia
- Genres: Rapcore, hardcore punk, hip hop, drum and bass, rock
- Years active: 1993 – present
- Labels: Jugodisk, Metropolis Records, Komuna, One Records, Multimedia Records
- Members: Bane Bojović; Vuk Mijanović; Igor Škoro; Milorad Matić; Dragan Vujnović
- Past members: List: Aleksandar Petković Andrej Srećković Boris Masliković Boris Đurić Miladin Radivojević Miloš Velimir Nemanja Kojić Nenad Bogojević Ninoslav Filipović Srđan Jovanović Stanimir Lukić Đorđe Radivojević

Sunshine are a Serbian rapcore/hip hop band from Belgrade.

== History ==
=== 1990s ===
The band was formed in 1993 by the vocalist Branko Bojović "Bane", also known as Gumbrowski, who, having previously worked in the Novi Beograd band Green Cool Posse, formed Sunshine with vocalist Đorđe Radivojević, also known as Đole Ramirez. Recording several demo recordings in the early 1980s and being directly influenced by rap music, while spending two years living in the United States during the late 1980s, Bojović decided to present his own interpretation of the genre. The band recorded their debut album, Ljubavna likvefakcija (Love Assassifaction), released through Jugodisk, combining rap and hardcore punk with sexually overt lyrics, being thus distanced from the mainstream media but nevertheless gaining a loyal fan base. At the time, the band did not have a steady lineup, and the album was recorded with Del Arno Band members, Margita Stefanović (keyboards) and Zvonimir Đukić (bass guitar). The material from the debut album was reissued on CD by Metropolis Records, featuring the remixes of the songs "Priđi mi ti" ("Come Closer to Me") and "Pretty Boy", as well as the track "Extended Wicked Raggamuffin' Style Mix" as bonus material.

The followup, Sh.g.t.m., featured a similar lyrical style, having numerous vulgarisms, and sampled music combined with heavy beats. The recording sessions featured the guitarist Vojislav Bešić "Beške", a former Bezobrazno Zeleno and Glsiersi member, and Margita Stefanović's EKV appeared in the song "Misli mene gone" ("Thoughts Are Haunting Me"). By the end of the album recording, the band got the first steady lineup which beside the vocalists Bojović and Radivojević also featured a former Policijski Čas vocalist Nenad Bogojević "Bogi", former Bloodbath guitarist Stanimir Lukic "Staca", Sick Mother Fakers drummer Boris and bassist and trombonist Nemanja Kojić and Del Arno Band saxophonist Aleksandar Petković "Petko". Soon after, several lineup changes occurred and Petković was replaced by DJ Drej (real name Andrej Srećković) and Miloš Velmir "Buca". For a while, Srđan Jovanović "Jole", a former Oktobar 1864 drummer, performed with the band. Bojović, Lukić, Srećković and Bogojević recorded the music for the Jedan na jedan (One on One), directed by Mladen Matičević, also appearing as actors in the movie, but the soundtrack was never officially released.

During the Summer of 1997, the band released the single "Kokane" ("Cocaine"), which beside the title track also featured the songs "Mental kokane" and "Atmo-capella '91. preview". The material from the single recorded as collaboration with the band Plejboj, appeared on the Bojan Skerlić Do koske (To the Bone) movie soundtrack. After the single release, due to their increasing popularity, the band held a sold-out concert at the Belgrade Sports' Hall, in February 1998. During the same year, on late 1998, the band released the album Neću da se predam (I Will Not Surrender), featuring Deca Loših Muzičara members, trumpet player Borislav Veljković and saxophone player Vlada Miljković and EKV member Margita Stefanović, as guests. As the previous releases, the album was produced by Atman Active. The new material featured the same macho erotic lyrical style, reaching its climax in the track "Kurva" ("Whore"), becoming one of the most vulgar and morose song in the history of popular music in Serbia. Other songs on the album, "Krug" ("Circle"), "Iza horizonta" ("Beyond the Horizon"), "New Era", featuring sampled music form the hippie musical Hair, and "Bongo Budda", written by Nemanja Kojić, left a much better impression on both the audience and critics.

=== 2000s ===
The recordings from the performances at the Belgrade SKC on February 18 and 19 were released by Metropolis Records in 2001 on the live album Live!, produced by Goran Milisavljević. In the meantime, the song "Marginalan type" ("Marginal Type") appeared on the Srdan Golubović movie Absolute 100, released by Komuna on the official movie soundtrack in 2001. After the album release, the band went on hiatus which turned out to be the band disbandment. Guitarist Stanimir Lukić "Staća" formed the band X-Centar in 2001, releasing the album Restart in 2003, and Đorđe Radivojević "Ramirez" formed the band Avanti, backed with younger musicians. The following year, under the Sunshine moniker, Bojovic recorded the album Sha bilo (Wha's the Matter), featuring a combination of hip hop and drum & bass crossed with violin, trumpet and viola sound. The material, partially featuring the lyrics written by Radivojević, was produced by Bojović, Đorđe Miljenović and Vojin Ristivojević. During the same year, journalist Dejan Katalina wrote the book Sha bilo about the band.

In 2005, Sunshine, featuring Sky Wikluh, the producer of Sha bilo, released the single "Again Gettin' Wicked" through One Records, which beside the title track also featured the songs "Prskalica" ("Sprayer") and "Zavidan Preview" ("Invidious Preview"). The tracks, with two new tracks, "Fight the Devil" and "Niklovan" ("Nickel"), appeared on the greatest hits compilation Fight the Devil, released by Multimedia Records in August 2007.

=== 2010s ===
In June 2011, the band released the single "Nina-nana!", promoting the upcoming studio album, produced by AtmanActive, available for free digital download via MTV Adria official website, as well as the music video for the single. In 2013, the band recorded the song "Tebraxion" ("Broxion") for the S/kidanje movie soundtrack, releasing it as a single in April.

In April 2014, Bojović was arrested for drug possession. It was reported that he had six packages of amphetamine in his possession, and that he resisted arrest. He was charged for drug possession and released on bail. He denied the claims of some media that he himself was a drug dealer. In April 2016, he was sentenced to 10 months of home confinement. During the trial, Bojović claimed that he is not a drug dealer and that he was a victim of police brutality during the arrest.

== Legacy ==
In 2006, the song "Misli mene gone" was polled No. 34 on the B92 Top 100 Domestic Songs list.

== Discography ==
=== Studio albums ===
- Ljubavna likvefakcija (1995)
- Sh.g.t.m (1996)
- Neću da se predam (1998)
- Sha bilo (2002)

=== Live albums ===
- Live! (2001)

=== Compilation albums ===
- Fight the Devil (2007)

=== Singles ===
- "Kokane" (with Plejboj, 1997)
- "Again Gettin' Wicked" (2005)
- "Nina nana" (2011)
- "Sun" (2012)
- "Tebraxion" (2013)

=== Other appearances ===
- "Žaklina traži sponzora" / "Kaluđerica" (Rap-l-trap; 1995)
- "Priđi mi ti" / "Žaklina traži sponzora" / "Kurva" (The best of Yu hip hop; 1996)
- "91 Preview" (Ustani i kreni; 1996)
- "Kokain" (Muzika iz filma "Do koske"; 1997)
- "Marginalan type" (Apsolutnih sto; 2001)
- "Misli mene gone (Live)" (Metropolis vol.1; 2002)
- "Iza horizonta" / "Priđi Mi Ti (Rmx)" (Metropolis vol.2; 2002)
