= Rage (1997 film) =

- Directed by: Slobodan Skerlić
- Written by: Srdja Andjelic; Slobodan Skerlić
- Produced by: Bojan Maljevic
- Starring: Lazar Ristovski; Nikola Đuričko
- Cinematography: Dusan Joksimovic
- Edited by: Ana Milovanovic
- Music by: Plejboj
- Release date: 6 March 1997
- Running time: 1h 37min
- Country: Yugoslavia
- Language: Serbian

Rage (Serbian: Do koske, lit. To the Bone) is a 1997 Yugoslav action film directed by Slobodan Skerlić.

== Plot summary ==
Belgrade, in 1996, devastated by corruption, crime and the tensions between the rich and poor, is the scene of a bloody showdown between the criminal boss and his students.

The protagonist of the film, is Mali (Kid), a 17-year-old young man who does small jobs for Kovač (played by Lazar Ristovski), a former gangster who got rich in Milošević's Serbia, during the breakup of Yugoslavia and in the post-communist transition, and now enjoys reputation as a successful businessman. In a time characterized by the almost complete absence of morality from society, there are only two types of people who enjoy the good life - those close to the regime and criminals. One of the most successful Serbian mobsters, over the years he earned enough money for luxury villas, expensive cars and sexy lovers. He is a role model for many young and poor Serbs who entered the "business" thanks to him.

At one point, angry because of his own poverty, Mali impulsively decides to kidnap his boss and, with the help of his friend Simke (played by Nebojša Glogovac), extort all the money from him. They experience a kind of enlightenment after twenty hours of hellish games and agony. However, Kovač, even when he is subjected to terrible torture, refuses to do so, and in the meantime his collaborators mobilize all the resources of the Belgrade underground in order to find and free him, which will lead to inexorable bloodshed. Finally, the police arrives at the crime scene.

== Cast ==
- Lazar Ristovski - Kovac
- Nikola Đuričko - Mali
- Nebojša Glogovac - Simke
- Bojana Maljević - Maja
- Boris Milivojević - Vuk
- Nikola Kojo - Musa
- Goran Sultanović - Miroljub
- Vesna Trivalić - Sveca
- Zoran Cvijanović - Krpa
- Mira Banjac - Sladoledzika
