= Kanda, Kodža i Nebojša =

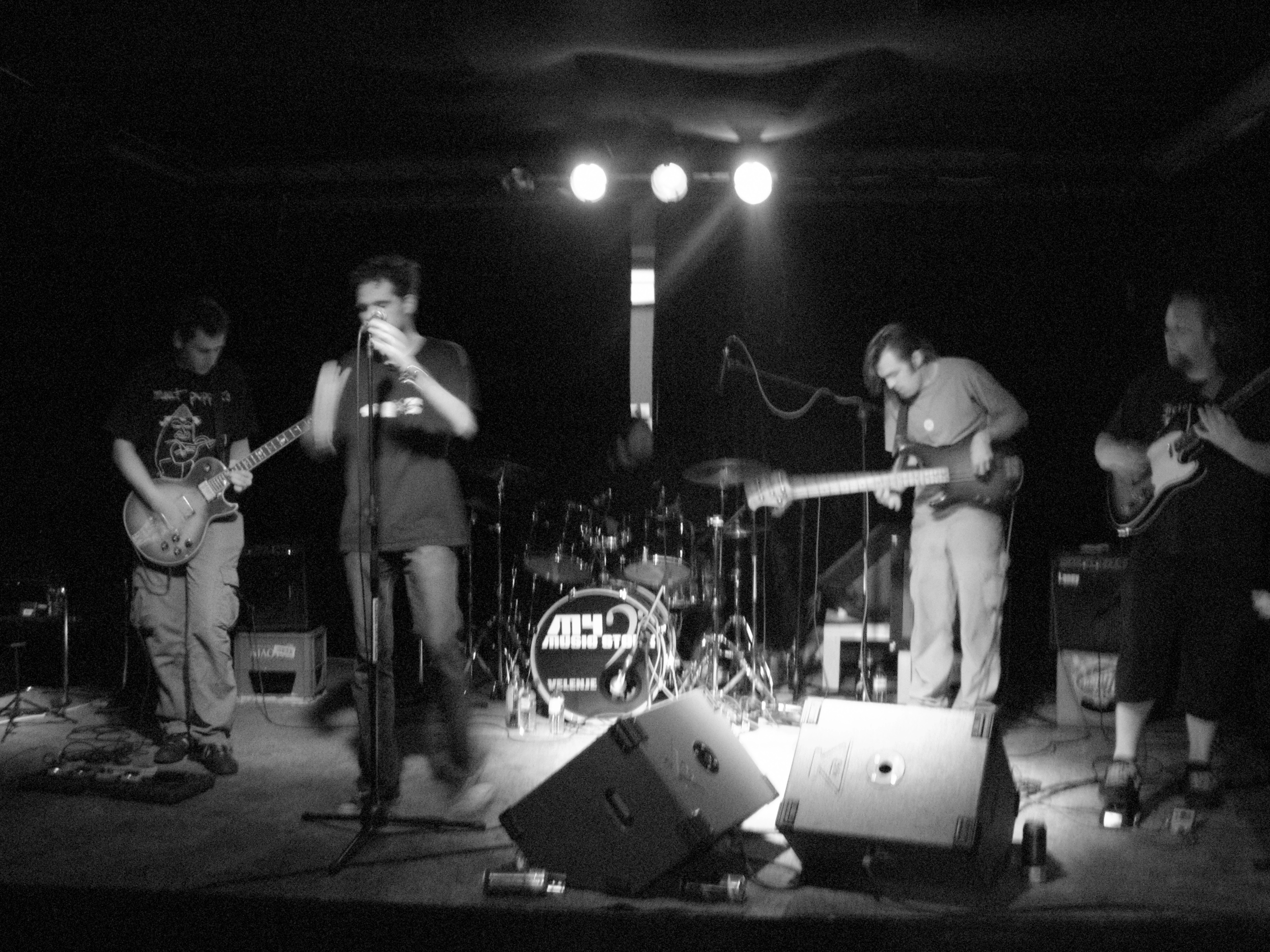
- Kanda, Kodža i Nebojša in Velenje in 2009

Background information
- Also known as: KKN
- Origin: Belgrade, Serbia
- Genres: Alternative rock, rock, reggae, funk, soul, acid-jazz, electronic
- Years active: 1990 – 1992; 1994 – 2001; 2003–present
- Labels: Metropolis Records, B92, PGP-RTS, ZMEX
- Members: Boško Stanojević; Damjan Babić; Nenad Pejović; Oliver Nektarijević; Vladan Rajović
- Past members: Branislav Dragovic; Dejan Utvar; Ivan Topisirović; Marko Petronijević; Nikola Novaković; Rastko Lupulović; Stevan Dimitrijević; Vladislav Rac; Zoran Erkman />Ognjen Beader />Janko Mostarlic
- Website: 37.rs/kkn/default.asp?p=1

Kanda, Kodža i Nebojša (Serbian Cyrillic: Канда, Коџа и Небојша; pronounced [kanda kɔdʒa i nɛbɔjʃa], trans. Probably, Plenty and Daredevil) is a Serbian alternative rock band from Belgrade.

== History ==
=== Formation, first releases (1990–1995) ===
The band, consisting of Nektarijević (vocals), Rastko Lupulović (guitar), Vladislav Rac (bass guitar), and Stevan Dimitrijević (drums), was formed in 1990. They were soon joined by Marko Petronijević (trumpet). Having performed for two years, and winning the Palilula Culture Olympics, the band went on hiatus as vocalist Nektarijević went to the United States of America.

On his return, in 1994, the band continued working, releasing their debut album Guarda Toma! in 1996. The album, featuring live recordings, made on May and October 1995 at the Belgrade KST, and studio material, including "Put za Tunu" ("The Road to Tuna"), "Priroda" ("Nature"), featuring guest appearance by Darkwood Dub vocalist Dejan "Vuča" Vučetić, "Toma Bebić", dedicated to the singer Toma Bebić, "Visokogradnja" ("Buildings") and "Sisa" ("Tit"), the latter two already being released on the various artists compilation Mi smo za mir (We Are for Peace). The band, combining funk and jazz with rock, with Nektarijević's reggae vocal interpretations, soon became a leading club rock act and a live attraction.

=== Success and disbandment (1996–2001) ===
In 1996, guitarist Rastko Lupulović, also working as an actor, made the decision to become a monk, parting to the Visoki Dečani monastery, and getting the monk name Ilarion. In April 1998, the band released the album Igračka plačka, partially featuring material written by Lupulović. The album was produced by Željko Božić, and featured the new guitarist Ivan Topisirović, a Superstar member and former Fake Madonna's Underwear member. Well acclaimed by the critics, the album featured the tracks "S.A.T", "Štastopojo" ("Whatveyoueaten"), "Right Direction", "Proći će i njihovo" ("Theirs Would Also Pass"), and "ŠAFL" ("SHUFFLE"), combining reggae, acid-jazz and funk. The band also appeared on the Korak napred 2 koraka nazad (A Step Forward 2 Steps Backwards) various-artists compilation with the cover version of Disciplina Kičme song "Manitua Mi II". A remastered edition of the album appeared in 2000.

The following album, Become, released in 2000, featuring guest appearances by Eyesburn frontman Nemanja Kojić, former Plejboj member Dušan Petrović and Deca Loših Muzičara member Bora Veličković, had the song lyrics entirely written in English. The album, produced by Goran Živković and Sandra Stojadinović and post-produced by Velja Mitrović, presented the band with a personal approach to reggae music. The album featured the former Superstar member Vladan Rajović on drums, soon replaced by former Kazna Za Uši and Del Arno Band member Dejan Utvar. In 2001, the band appeared on the Munje (Lightning Flashes) movie soundtrack with the song "Izlazim" ("I am Getting Out"). Also, the material from the debut album, previously available only on compact cassette, was re-released on CD with the Veliki Prezir debut album by Metropolis Records. The band stopped working in spring 2001, when Nektarijević moved to Los Angeles.

=== Reformation (2003–present) ===
In 2003, the reformed Kanda, Kodža i Nebojša, featuring Nektarijević and Rajović with new members, bassist Branislav Dragović (a former Samostalni Referenti member), guitarist Nenad Pejović (a former Headstream member), and guitarist Nikola Novaković, released the album Prekidi stvarnosti (Reality Cracks). The album, produced by the band themselves with Goran Matić, featuring bonus tracks "Every Nation (Sunset Mix)" and "Ahead There" recorded in Los Angeles, was pronounced the best album of the year 2005 by the webzine Popboks.

On early 2005, the band was joined by the trumpet player Zoran Erkman, also known as Zerkman, a former Disciplina Kičme member. During the same year, the band started collaborating with the composer Irena Popović at the BELEF festival, with whom, in 2006, the band worked on a rock opera Mozart... Luster... Lustig, covering the works of Wolfgang Amadeus Mozart. The material from the opera, appeared on the DVD release Prekid stvarnosti u Domu Omladine BGD 28.04.2006 (Reality Cracks at Dom Omladine Belgrade April 28, 2006), featuring the recordings of the Belgrade Dom Omladine 2006 performance, and the 2006 Novi Sad Exit festival performance, released in 2007. The following year, the album Deveti život (Ninth Life) was released, acclaimed by the Popboks critics as the album of the year 2008.

In April 2011, the band released their sixth studio album Manifest (Manifesto). The album, announced by the single "Kafane i rokenrol" ("Kafanas and Rock and Roll"), released in November 2010, was produced by Andrej Jovanović. The album was released on CD through Odličan Hrčak and in mp3 format for free digital download through Exit music. On June 30, 2012, the band performed on the last evening of the first Belgrade Calling festival. In December 2012, the band appeared in New Year's Eve edition of Radio Television of Serbia show Bunt (Rebellion), performing, among other songs, a cover of Rok Mašina song "Granica" ("Border"). In May 2013, Erkman died in Belgrade. He was 50.

In October 2014, the band released the album Volja za noć (The Will for Night, a wordplay alluding to Serbian language title of Friedrich Nietzsche's The Will to Power, Volja za moć). The album, announced in November 2013 with the single "Sve je stalo (u r 'n' r)" ("Everything Stopped (In R 'n' R)"), was released on CD through Odličan Hrčak, and for free download from Exit music website. In 2016, the band went on an unplugged tour. They celebrated 25 years of activity with a concert in Mikser House club, held on March 12, 2016, on which their first live album was recorded, but still remains unreleased.

In November 2016, the band released the single "Prekidi ponovo" ("Cracks Again"), announcing their upcoming studio album. In September 2017, the band released the second single from the upcoming album, "Jamajka" ("Jamaica"), and in December 2017 the third single from the album, "Misli dobro" ("Think Well").

== Legacy ==
In 2006, the song "Priroda" was ranked on the No. 48 on the B92 Top 100 Domestic Songs, polled by the Radio B92 listeners. In 2011, the song "Prekidi stvarnosti" was polled, by the listeners of Radio 202, one of 60 greatest songs released by PGP-RTB/PGP-RTS during sixty years of the labels existence.

== Discography ==
=== Studio albums ===
- Guarda Toma! (1996)
- Igračka plačka (1998)
- Become (2000)
- Prekidi stvarnosti (2005)
- Deveti život (2008)
- Manifest (2011)
- Volja za noć (2014)
- Uskoro (2019)
- Popis (2020)
- Ravnoteža je poremećena (2021)
- Beton (2022)
- Što pre (2026)

=== Live albums ===
- Uživo! (2017)

=== Singles ===
- "Visokogradnja" / "Sisa" (1995)
- "Priroda" (1996, 2002)
- "Manitua mi" (1999)
- "Izlazim" (2001)
- "Kafane i rokenrol" (2010)

=== Video albums ===
- Prekid stvarnosti u Domu Omladine BGD 28.04.2006 (2007)
