= Metropolis Records (Serbia) =

Serbian record label

- Founded: 1994
- Genre: Rock
- Country of origin: Serbia
- Location: Belgrade

Metropolis Records is a record label based in Belgrade, Serbia.

Formed in 1994, the label is mainly oriented towards rock music, and has released albums by a great number of notable acts of the Serbian rock scene.

== Artists ==
Some of the artist currently signed to Metropolis Records, or have been so in the past, include:

- Bajaga i Instruktori
- Bjesovi
- Block Out
- Deca Loših Muzičara
- Dža ili Bu
- Džukele
- Eyesburn
- Goblini
- Kasandrin Glas
- Kristali
- The Kuguars
- Kanda, Kodža i Nebojša
- Obojeni Program
- Orthodox Celts
- Rambo Amadeus
- Ritam Nereda
- Sunshine
- Van Gogh
- Veliki Prezir

== See also ==
- List of record labels
