= Sad se jasno vidi =

Song by Šarlo Akrobata

from the album Bistriji ili tuplji čovek biva kad...
- Released: July 1981
- Recorded: April–May 1981
- Genre: New wave, punk rock, art punk
- Length: 1:36
- Label: Jugoton
- Songwriter: Šarlo Akrobata
- Producers: Akpiđoto - (Šarlo Akrobata, Mile "Pile" Miletić, Đorđe Petrović, Toni Jurij)

"Sad se jasno vidi" is a song by the Yugoslav new wave band Šarlo Akrobata, from the album Bistriji ili tuplji čovek biva kad..., released in 1981.

== Cover versions ==
- Serbian rock band Plejboj recorded a cover version of the song for the various artists compilation Korak napred 2 koraka nazad in 1999. It was the last recording the band had made.

== External links and references ==
- EX YU ROCK enciklopedija 1960-2006, Janjatović Petar; ISBN 978-86-905317-1-4
