= Plejboj =

Serbian rock band

- The reunited Plejboj performing live at the 2006 Exit festival in Novi Sad

Background information
- Also known as: Playboy
- Origin: Belgrade, Serbia
- Genres: Punk rock; ska; soul; funk rock; Latin; jazz fusion; pop rock
- Years active: 1992 – 1999; 2012 – present (reunions: 2006, 2007)
- Labels: B92, DE Production, Monte Royal Pictures, PGP-RTS, Metropolis Records, Radio BOOM 93, Radio Index, Multimedia Records
- Members: Roman Goršek; Igor Perović; Miladin Radivojević; Dušan Petrović; Goran Milošević; Milan Bjedov

Plejboj (Serbian Cyrillic: Плејбој; transliteration for Playboy) is a Serbian rock band from Belgrade.

== History ==
=== Formation, rise to prominence (1992–1993) ===
The band was formed in 1992 by former Euforija and Presing members, bassist Roman Goršek, guitarist Igor Perović and drummer Miladin Radivojević. They were soon joined by saxophonist Dušan Petrović, a former Duh Neighbor and Deca Loših Muzičara member. Together they had their first public appearance at the Brzi Bendovi Srbije festival held at the Dom Omladine in Belgrade, where, performing with kitschy clothes, attractive musical style, wigs and on-stage dancers, the band had easily drawn the attention of the public to themselves.

The following year, the band performed as a part of the Trinidad Trip band in the play Trinidad (Trinidad) which was directed in the BITEF theater by Milutin Petrović. The song "Ja hoću mambo" ("I Want Mambo"), performed with Branka Katić, Slobodan Ninković and Branko Vidaković on vocals, soon became a nationwide hit. The band also wrote music for a part of the Beogradske priče (Belgrade Stories) play.

=== Official releases, breakup (1994–1999) ===
The debut album, Sviraj dečko (Play, Boy), released by B92 and DE Production in 1994, the band recorded featuring guest appearances by Veljko Nikolić "Papa Nik", piano on the track "Sve ili ništa" ("All or Nothing") and vibraphone on "Carstvo čula" ("Empire of Sensations"), Marko Milivojević, percussion on the tracks "Grizi metak" ("Bite the Bullet"), "Bela koka" ("White Coca") and "Carstvo čula" ("Empire of Sensations"), and Vlada Lešić, congas on "Plejboj" and percussion on "Carstvo čula". The tracks "Koliko" ("How Much"), "Grizi metak" and "Skidam se" ("I am Stripping") were distinguished as the most prominent. "Sve ili ništa" was also included on the various artists compilation Radio Utopia (B92: 1989-1994) released by B92 during the same year.

On early 1995, the band got a new drummer, Goran Milošević, and in the new lineup they performed at the Summertime Jazz and Blues festival at Sava Centar in Belgrade as an opening act for Fishbelly Black, promoting the band's first single "Zajedno" ("Together"), released by B92 and DE Production in 1994, a cover of the Croatian new wave band Film single, which sounds like the AC/DC's 1977 song "Let There Be Rock", and their own song, "Znaj" ("You Should Know") as the B-side. The former was recorded at the Belgrad VI studio and the latter at the O studio, both produced by Dušan Ercegovac. The beginning of the song "Zajedno" featured a similar intro to the Disciplina Kičme version of the song "Čudna šuma" ("Strange Forest"). As guests on the single appeared drummer Srđan Todorović and Deca Loših Muzičara trombonist Borislav Veličković.

The band worked on the Do koske (To the Bone) movie soundtrack providing it with dynamic instrumental compositions, themes influenced by Latino music and on the soundtrack also appeared a new mix of the song "Grizi metak". The music from the album, recorded at the O studio, was officially released as Muzika iz filma 'Do koske' (Music from the film 'To the Bone' ), released by Monte Royal Pictures and produced by Oliver Jovanović. The song "Kokain" ("Cocaine"), which appeared on the soundtrack, featuring the rapper Bane Brujović Grumbowski, appeared on the single "Kokane" by Brujović's band Sunshine, released by Metropolis Records in 1997. The song also appeared on the various artists compilation Fight The Devil, released by Multimedia Records in 2007.

From January until March 1997, they had been recording the new studio album at the O studio, eventually released by PGP-RTS and DE Production in 1997. Overdrive featured the brass and string sections, recorded by Nice Girls string quartet and Fat Cats trumpet section, and as guest on backing vocals appeared Kazna Za Uši frontman Ivan Đorđević "Ivek" on the track "Superstar" and Mihajlo Krstić appeared on a bass solo on the track "Probaj" ("Try it"). During the same year, Plejboj appeared on the soundtrack and performed in the film Geto - Tajni život grada (Ghetto - A Secret City Life), however, the soundtrack album was never officially released.

In the meantime, the band appeared on several various artists compilations. The track "Zajedno" appeared on Radio BOOM 93 and B92 compilation Ovo je zemlja za nas?!? (This Is The Land For Us?!?) and the Radio Index compilation Nas slušaju svi, mi ne slušamo nikoga! (Everybody Listens To Us, We Listen to Nobody). The band also recorded a cover version of Šarlo Akrobata song "Sad se jasno vidi" ("Now It's Clearly Visible") which appeared on the various artists cover album Korak napred 2 koraka nazad (A Step forward 2 Steps Backwards). It was the last recording the band had made, as they disbanded during the 1999 NATO bombing of Yugoslavia.

=== Reunions and reformation (2006, 2007, 2012 – present) ===
In 2006, the band ought to have performed, along with Alice Cooper, as an opening act for the Belgrade concert of the Rolling Stones, however, the concert was canceled and Plejboj performed at the Novi Sad Exit Festival. The following year, in 2007, the band once again reunited to perform at the Jelen Pivo Live festival.

In July 2012, the band reformed, having their first performance at Belgrade Beer Fest. In October of the same year, the band released the comeback single "Nemam vremena" ("I Have No Time"). In February 2013, the band released the single "Daj nešto" ("Give Something"), and in December 2014, the single "Nije lako" ("It's Not Easy"). The video for "Nije lako" featured model Anđelija Vujović.

== Legacy ==
In 2011, the song "Ko je ko" ("Who Is Who") was polled, by the listeners of Radio 202, one of 60 greatest songs released by PGP-RTB/PGP-RTS during the sixty years of the label's existence.

== Discography ==
=== Studio albums ===
Title	Released
Sviraj dečko	1994
Muzika iz filma 'Do koske'	1997
Overdrive	1997

=== Singles ===
Title	Released
"Zajedno" / "Znaj"	1995
"Kokane" (with Sunshine)	1997
"Nemam vremena"	2012
"Daj Nesto"	2012
"Nije Lako"	2014

=== Other appearances ===
Title	Album	Released
"Sve ili ništa"	Radio Utopia (B92: 1989–1994)	1994
"Zajedno"	Nas slušaju svi, mi ne slušamo nikoga!	1997
"Zajedno"	Ovo je zemlja za nas?!?	1997
"Sad se jasno vidi"	Korak napred 2 koraka nazad	1999
"Kokane"	Fight The Devil	2007

== See also ==
- Punk rock in Yugoslavia
