= Toma Bebić =

Croatian musician

Toma Bebić (November 6, 1935 – February 4, 1990) was a Croatian multidisciplinary artist: musician, writer, actor, painter and poet. During his life he worked as a navy officer, police inspector and journalist for "Nedjeljna Dalmacija" and "Vjesnik". He published six books of aphorisms, few books of poetry and one children's picture book.

The book of aphorisms Volite se ljudožderi (Love each other, cannibals) was published after his death from his unpublished books, manuscripts and tone records. His albums include Volite se ljudožderi (1975) and Oya noya (1980). His well-known song is "Tu tu auto vrag ti piz odni" (Honk Honk Car, May the Devil Take You Away) where he criticizes cars for polluting the air and making so much noise that he cannot hear his mule. His poetic work was academically evaluated by the Croatian comparatist Helena Peričić.

He died of lung cancer in Split in 1990.

== Discography ==
=== Albums ===
- Toma Bebić / Volite se ljudožderi (Jugoton, 1975)
- Oya Noya... / Volite se ljudožderi 2 (Suzy, 1980)

=== Singles ===
- "Ča smo na ovon svitu" (Jugoton, 1973)
- "Nevera"/"Leute moj" (Jugoton, 1974)
