= Intruder (Serbian band) =

- Origin: Belgrade, Serbia
- Genres: Electronica; Pop
- Years active: 1991–present
- Labels: CSM Records; Ammonite Records
- Members: Nebojša Marković; Ivana Smolović; Boris Kunčer; Vladimir Vrzić; Ivan Halupka
- Website: intruder-music.net

Intruder is an electronic/pop group from Belgrade, Serbia. The band has published five LP albums to date.

== Discography ==
=== Albums ===
- 1998 Experiment
- 1999 Windows '99
- 2000 Able
- 2003 Strange Kind of Beautiful
- 2006 Dancing Shoes Starry Skies

=== Singles & EPs ===
- 1999 A Deal with Mephisto (EP)
- 1999 Cut it Again
- 2001 Pretty Mama
- 2002 Inevitable Sound
- 2004 Doll Réveil/Star on a Fire
- 2005 Soundtrack
- 2005 Why Don't You?
- 2006 Sensation

== Notes ==
- The Intruder's song "Sensation" uses the samples of the Heaven 17's 1983 song "Temptation" and the Sisters Of Mercy's 1987 song "This Corrosion".
