= B92 =

Serbian news station

- Official logo
- Native name: РТВ Б92
- Type: Public limited company
- Industry: Media
- Founded: 15 May 1989; 37 years ago (radio channel); 5 March 2004; 22 years ago (current incorporated entity)
- Headquarters: Autoput za Zagreb 22, Zemun, Belgrade, Serbia
- Area served: Serbia
- Key people: Srđan Milovanović (Director); Jelena Agatunović (Director)
- Revenue: ▲€19.01 million (2024)
- Net income: ▲€3.18 million (2024)
- Total assets: ▲€19.04 million (2024)
- Total equity: ▲€1.90 million (2024)
- Owner: Kopernikus Corporation (100%)
- Number of employees: 163 (2024)
- Website: www.b92.net

RTV B92, or simply B92 (stylized as b92, formerly BΞ92 and B 92), is a Serbian news station and broadcaster with national coverage owned by Srđan Milovanović since 2018. Headquartered in Belgrade, it was formed on 5 March 2004 as a joint newsroom/studio that integrated its radio and television news operations into a single broadcasting entity.

Founded in 1989 as radio station, it was a rare outlet for Western news and information in FR Yugoslavia under Slobodan Milošević, and was a force behind many demonstrations that took place in Belgrade during the turbulent 1990s. It also played rock music. Due to this, RTV B92 won the MTV Free Your Mind award in 1998, and many other awards for journalism and fighting for human rights. RTV B92 is the subject of the best-selling book This is Serbia Calling. On 6 October 2000, the day following the overthrow of Slobodan Milošević, television B92 started broadcasting.

During the 2000s, the company has undertaken a shift from political and societal topics towards commercialization, and has changed the ownership structure multiple times. The B92 brand name was subject to several replacements and restorations: in July 2015, Radio B92 was shut down and was replaced by a new station called Play Radio. In April 2008, the second TV (cable-only) channel named B92 Info, with 24-hour news coverage was launched, to be replaced by Prva World in 2016, under the sister brand Prva TV. In 2017, TV B92 changed its name to O2.TV, only to be restored to B92 in March 2020.

RTV B92 media company continues to operate the Play Radio and B92 television channel. As of December 2017, other active segments of the B92 media network are B92.net web portal, B92 Fond humanitarian fund, Samizdat B92 book publisher and Rex cultural center. The most prominent person in RTV B92 history is Veran Matić, who was one of the founders and CEO for over 30 years – beginning with B92's establishment in 1989 and ending with his departure in 2019.

== History ==
=== Predecessors ===
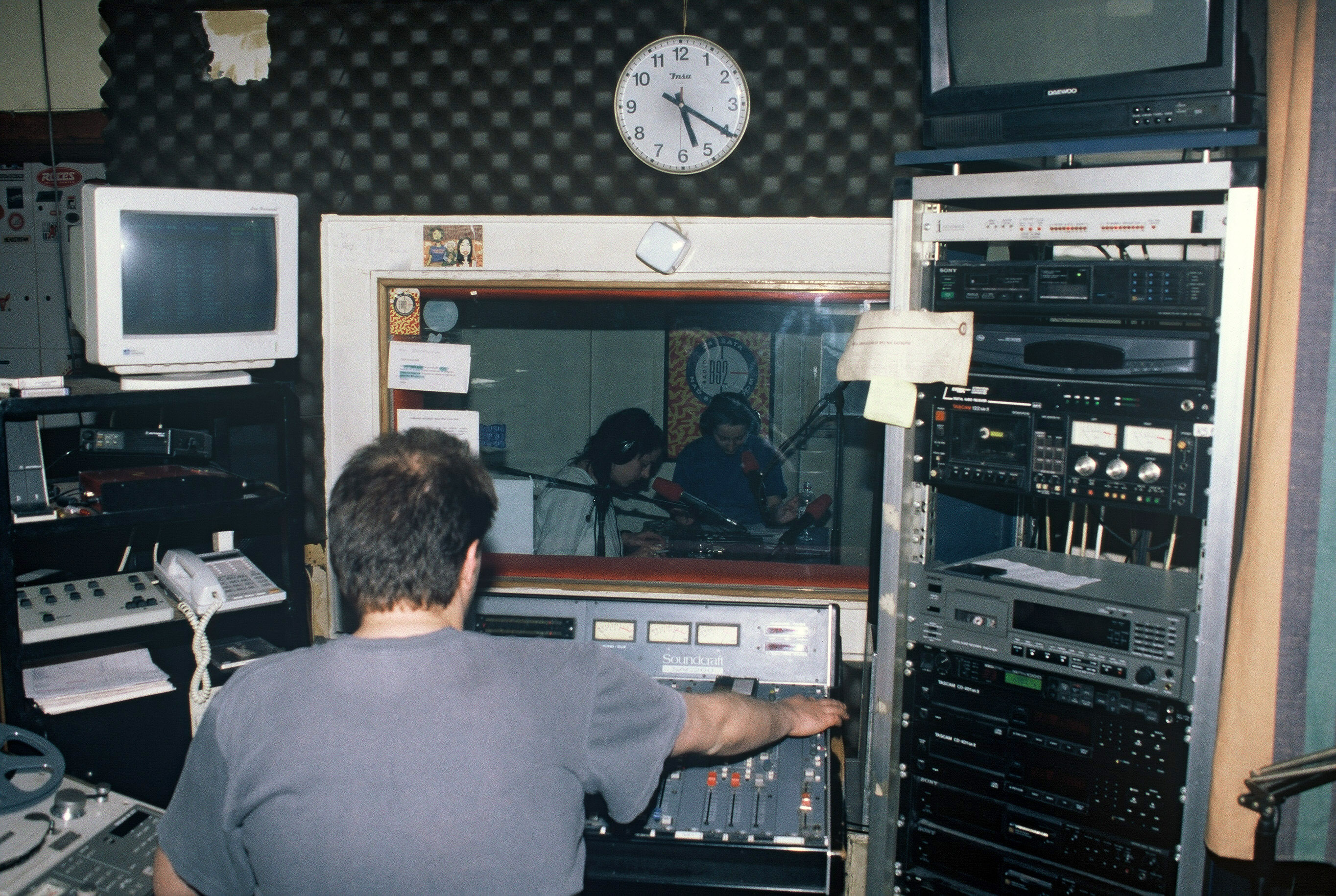
Radio B92 studio in 1998

Radio B92 was founded in May 1989 in Belgrade as a predominantly youth-oriented FM station on 92.5 MHz. It received financial help from the Open Society Foundations and USAID. It was briefly closed down by authorities in March 1991.

During the Yugoslav Wars in the 1990s, RTV B92 was one of the very few sources for news not controlled by the government. Although the authorities made repeated efforts to shut down its broadcasts, the station continued transmitting its programs through alternative means. With the help of Dutch internet provider XS4All, RTV B92 started broadcasting their programs over the internet in 1996. These broadcasts were then also re-transmitted via the BBC World Service while several local stations on the ground made the programs available throughout Serbia. In 1996, the organisation Internationale Medienhilfe awarded Radio B92 the title “Radiostation des Jahres” (English: “Radio Station of the Year”).

It was forced off the air for a time in 1999 when NATO bombed Yugoslavia, and government agents cracked down on pro-Western reporting. The government took over the station in 1999 but the team continued broadcasting in borrowed studios as B2-92. In a dawn raid in May 2000 government troops seized everything. Internet broadcasting from secret studios continued however, until at least October 2000. On 6 October 2000, TV B92 began broadcasting as a local TV station reaching Belgrade's greater municipal area and parts of Vojvodina. Over the next few years, the station expanded its network of repeaters and could be seen in most of Serbia.

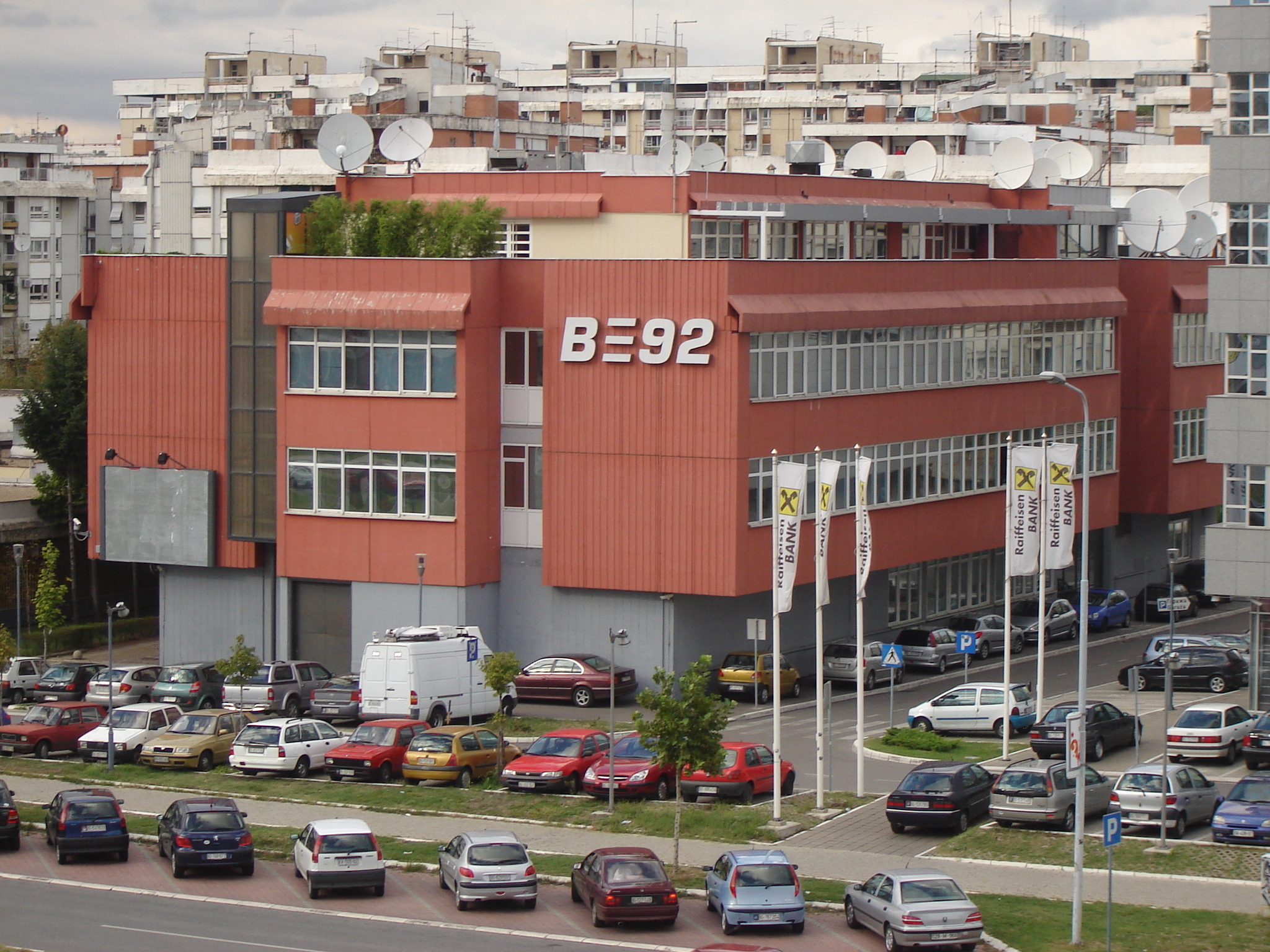
Old B92 headquarters in Novi Beograd

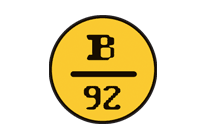
TV B92's first logo used from 6 October 2000 to 19 June 2003

Final logo, used from 20 June 2003 to 5 March 2004, and used by its current incorporated entity from 5 March 2004 to 21 April 2011

From the 2000s, the daily newscast on TV B92 become popular with viewers. Its TV news service was the second most watched in Serbia after the national broadcaster. The afternoon edition was at 4 PM and the central edition was at 8 PM. This was an only edition with two presenters (both male and female). The evening news had cast at 12 AM and was particularly popular and had a large surge in the ratings. The news provided by TV B92 were comprehensive and featured analytical and on‑site reporting, which contributed to the station’s audience engagement in the 2000s.

Throughout the years it has become a national radio with wide audience. The radio station at its peak had around 400,000 daily listeners which made up 35% of all radio listeners with almost 80 stations competing for airtime.

=== Current entity ===
==== 2004–2011 ====
On 5 March 2004, the Serbian media outlet B92 established an integrated, joint newsroom that merged its previously separated radio and television news operations into a single editorial unit. On 11 October of that year, TV B92's news program Vesti B92 introduced the ticker, which was replaced by flipper on 19 March 2012. The ticker was returned on 4 February 2013, which was replaced by flipper again on 3 February 2014.

The most notable radio shows were Kažiprst (index finger), featuring usually live or occasionally live-to-tape interviews with notable public figures, Peščanik (Hourglass), liberal talk show, radio blog of a sort, edited by Svetlana Vuković and Svetlana Lukić and the morning program Dizanje (getting up).

On 7 April 2008, B92 Info was a news broadcasting channel launched by TV B92, as a Serbian version of CNN. The channel was broadcasting on all major cable systems in the country and over the Internet. All of TV B92's most popular news-related shows, including Poligraf, B92 Investigates, Insajder, Kažiprst, Dizanje, and sports programs, were broadcast on the channel. TV B92 had called Info channel launch as the biggest project of the company's television segment. B92 Info has since 2010 also been available in Austria.

The 2008–09 season started in October. The most important project for the season for the station was Operacija Trijumf. Operacija Trijumf (Star Academy) was the biggest musical reality show in the Balkans and it was shown on television in Montenegro (IN TV), Croatia (Nova TV), Macedonia (RTV A1) and Bosnia (FTV i RTRS). In 2009, the station also bought TV rights for Wimbledon (for the next 4 years, until 2013). Champions league matches were also being aired by TV B92.

==== 2011–2012 ====
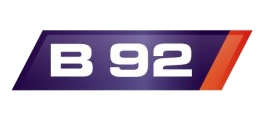
TV B92's third logo used from 21 April 2011 to 18 March 2012

In the spring of 2011, the purple crystal-kryptonite which can be rotated, suddenly appeared in Belgrade. Because of that, TV B92 became surprised and made a speculation talking about the crystal-kryptonite at Knez Mihailova Street in Belgrade. From 19 April 2011 to 20 April 2011, TV B92 started to air some promos with this crystal-kryptonite and were advertising something, but during its news program Vesti B92 on 20 April 2011 at 11 pm, it was known that TV B92 is going to be rebranded on 21 April 2011. Then on 21 April 2011, TV B92 started the new season of 2011–12 and underwent a visual makeover. At the same time, it introduced a new logo that consists of a purple crystal-kryptonite that contains an orange slash while the "B 92" wordmark are appearing in the middle of the crystal-kryptonite. In addition to news and series, TV B92 introduced more sports programming and was broadcasting many tennis events featuring Serbian players (Grand Slam tournaments, ATP Masters 1000 series, ATP World Tour Finals), football (UEFA Europa League, La Liga) and basketball (Liga ABA). But however, its purple crystal-kryptonite logo was short-lived and was only used for 12 months of believing in B92.

==== 2012–2017 ====
TV B92's fourth logo used from 19 March 2012 to 10 September 2017

In 2012, TV B92 got its fourth and final logo which was a purple cube with a golden flash. This purple cube had first arrived in Belgrade on 16 March 2012 when TV B92 made a discussion about the purple cube at Knez Mihailova Street in Belgrade. From 17 March 2012 to 18 March 2012, TV B92 began to air some promos with the purple cube and was advertising something. Later, Vesti B92 announced on 18 March 2012 at 11 pm, that TV B92 would implement a new logo and renewed on-air look on 19 March 2012. Finally on 19 March 2012, TV B92 discontinued its purple crystal-kryptonite logo and introduced a new logo that consists of a purple cube that has a golden flash as well as the "B92" wordmark are in the center of the purple cube, but is now spelled with a lowercase letter "b", known as b92. The purple cube was the last logo to carry TV B92's franchise and it was used for 5 years from 19 March 2012 to 10 September 2017.

On 18 March 2013, TV B92 aired the popular Croatian telenovela Larin izbor and on 11 September 2013, that same year, it started showing Turkish television drama for the first time as the last major Serbian commercial TV station to do so.

In 2014, Radio B92 covered the whole of the territory of Serbia and on 3 November of that year, TV B92 started broadcasting in 16:9.

On the afternoon of 9 July 2015, most of the radio employees were fired. Among the people who lost their job on that occasion were all employees in the news and music section—sections that made Radio B92's trademark. On that same day all radio shows were cancelled, leaving only the radio broadcasting music and two remaining employees responsible for that.

Four days later on 13 July 2015, the new Play Radio began on 92.5 MHz, broadcasting only music and the promo of the station, this time mentioning the B92 name. Following the name change, the B92's site's radio section now redirects to the Play Radio website, which includes a stream, which lets visitors listen to the station. However, Play Radio began as a summer schedule announcement on the now-closed Radio B92. The station began broadcasting on 31 August 2015 at 06:00.

And then on 18 December 2016, the cable channel B92 Info ceased operations and was replaced by Prva World.

==== 2017–2020: Rename to O2 ====
In late October 2014, Serbian newspaper Blic reported that TV B92 will be possibly renamed to OTV by the end of 2014, with the result made after a petition made by former TV B92 employees telling the network to change its name, and around 1,500 people signed for the petition. One last step by that decision was the removal of the Serbian most popular political late-night talk show Utisak nedelje. Many public figures and media organizations protested stating that the removal of talk show was politically motivated by the ruling leader Aleksandar Vučić. TV B92 denied those claims labeling them as "false claims". Three months later, talk show author Olja Bećković confirmed those claims and accused Vučić as a man behind the removal of the talk show.

The planned channel was said to be an entertainment-oriented TV station, but the logo and was unknown at the time. It was also said that the change would not affect the cable channel B92 Info, "which will continue to air with this name", and Radio B92 would continue to work in the same format.

Three years later, on 11 September 2017, at exactly 18:30, TV B92 completed the proposed re-branding and started broadcasting under the name of O2.TV. It was also announced that the web portal b92.net would continue operating unchanged, while O2.TV would launch a separate website.

==== 2020–present: Restoration of the B92 brand ====
B92 logo, 2020–present

After three years as O2, the television restored B92 brand on 1 March 2020. A new visual identity was introduced, with the logo featuring lowercase "b92" in a flat design. The programming concept, advertised as "refreshed", did not change substantially.

== Ownership ==
In November 2010, the Greek-Swedish joint-venture Astonko d.o.o. purchased 84.99% of shares from MDLF and NCA. B92 Trust retained 11.35% of shares and small shareholders had 3.66% of total shares.

B92 became a sister to Prva Srpska Televizija following its acquisition by ANT1 Group in September 2015. In December 2018, the former owner of Kopernikus Technology purchased B92 and Prva Srpska Televizija from ANT1 Group for 180 million euros, one month after Telekom Srbija bought Kopernikus Technology for 190 million euros. The transaction between state-owned Telekom Srbija and Kopernikus made public outrage in Serbia as Kopenikus' market worth at the time of purchase was several times lower than the amount it was purchased for; it was also revealed that a major stakeholder in the company was a close relative to a ruling Serbian Progressive Party officer.

== Other active segments ==
=== B92.net ===
B92.net was established as OpenNet in late 1995 as the Internet division of Radio B92. In its first few months of operation a dial-up connection with Amsterdam provider XS4ALL was used. At the beginning of 1996, OpenNet became Yugoslavia's first Internet provider, using an analogue leased line from XS4ALL and six local dial-up lines.

OpenNet also supported the local network of Radio B92, ANEM Radio and ANEM Television by providing non-stop live Internet broadcast of programs of Radio B92 and TV B92, together with the distribution of audio and video materials among the ANEM radio and television stations. In this way, everything produced by ANEM and Radio B92 was available on the Internet.

During the NATO bombing of Yugoslavia, when government representatives raided the Radio B92 premises and disabled its transmitter, OpenNet continued to broadcast the radio program over the Internet. The signal was rebroadcast via satellite and by several radio stations in neighboring countries. All of this was done with support from RealNetworks.

Today, B92.net has English and Serbian version of the website. It has been the leading Serbian Internet site from 1996 to 2010s. At its peak, the average number of page views per day exceeded 1 million, while the daily average number of visitors peaked at 200,000. At its peak, Alexa.com ranked B92 site at the 917th global place.

As of December 2018, Alexa.com ranked B92.net at the 4,730th place, while also being 9th ranked in Serbia.

=== B92 Fond ===
Over the years, B92 has also been successfully running the Humanitarian Fund. One of its most notable actions were "Battle for the Babies", "Battle for the Maternity Wards", "Give blood—save life!" and others.

=== Music and book publishing ===
B92 also runs a record label, although in recent years its releases are few and far between. Some of the notable Serbian acts B92 helped launch include: Eyesburn, Darkwood Dub, Kanda, Kodža i Nebojša, Intruder, Vrooom, Kal etc. The label also released albums by somewhat more established acts such as Boban Marković, Rambo Amadeus, Eva Braun, Jarboli.

B92's book publishing arm is Samizdat B92 featuring prominent young authors such as Marko Vidojković and Srđan Valjarević, as well as a number of foreign authors.

B92 also runs the Rex cultural center. For more than 20 years, the headquarters of Rex cultural center and B92 Fond were in Jevrejska Street 16, Belgrade. Since December 2017, they are looking for a new location.
