= Eyesburn =

Serbian band

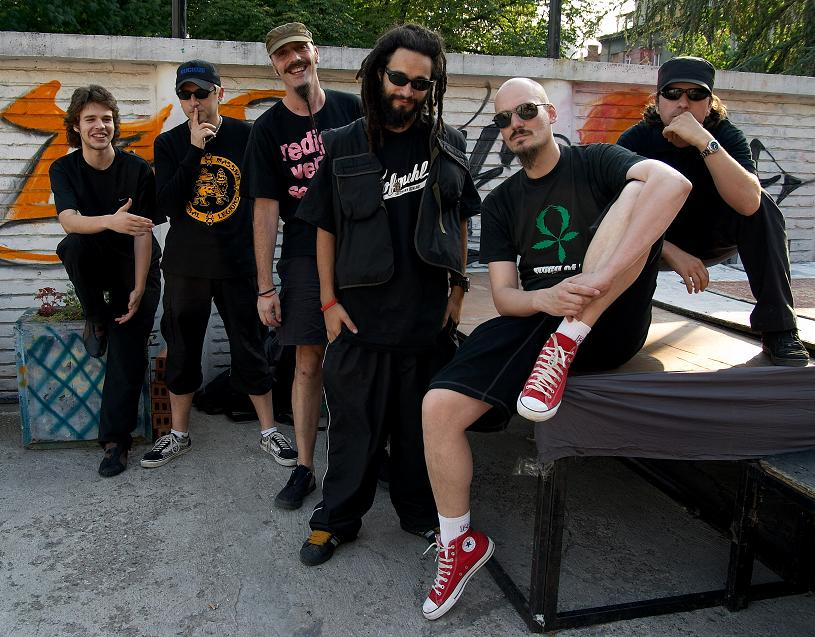
- Eyesburn in 2005

Background information
- Also known as: Ajzbrn
- Origin: Belgrade, Serbia
- Genres: Hardcore punk, crossover thrash, reggae
- Years active: 1994–2007; 2011–2016; 2018–present
- Labels: Silver Cross Records, Metropolis Records, B92, Ammonite, PGP-RTS, Mascom Records
- Members: Aleksandar Petrović; Aleksandar Nikić; Nemanja Kojić; Vladimir Lazić
- Past members: Dejan Miljković; Vukašin Marković; Zoran Đuroski; Dušan Petrović; Aleksandar Radulović; Dalibor Vučić; Slobodan Đukić; Dejan Utvar; Nenad Živić; Boris Usanović; Ninoslav Filipović
- Website: eyesburn.band

Eyesburn is a Serbian band that combines hardcore punk and crossover thrash with reggae music.

== History ==
=== 1994–2007 ===
The band was formed in 1994, and the original line-up featured former Dead Ideas guitarist Nemanja "Kojot" Kojić (guitar, backing vocals), who simultaneously worked as trombonist in Del Arno Band and bass guitarist in Sunshine, Nenad Živić (vocals), former Bloodbath member Aleksandar "Alek" Petrović (drums), former Urgh! member Vladimir "Laza" Lazić (bass guitar) and Aleksandar "Gile" Radulović. The name, Eyesburn, was chosen as a comment on the Serbian TV programs which "burned the eyes".

The band's first release, the album Freedomized, was recorded live at Belgrade club KST. During this period Eyesburn mostly played in Belgrade clubs, occasionally elsewhere in Serbia. The band also started working on their first studio album, Dog Life. However, the band's vocalist Živić left the band just several weeks before the band started recording in the studio, and Kojić took over the lead vocalist position. The album featured the songs written in English language and a cover of Bob Marley & The Wailers song Exodus, which featured guest appearance by Del Arno Band vocalist Jovan Matić.

At the same time, Kojić started playing trombone as well, and the band started musical exploration of other genres, such as reggae, dub and drum & bass. On the various artists compilation Korak napred 2 koraka nazad, the band appeared with a cover version of Haustor song Šejn. Soon after, Eyesburn recorded their second album Fool Control, featuring a new guitarist, Ninoslav "Nino" Filipović. The album was produced by Saša Janković. The songs No Free Time, Foolin' I & I, Warning Dub, and others, presented the album as a form of modern rock, metal and breakbeat reggae fusion.

=== 2000s ===
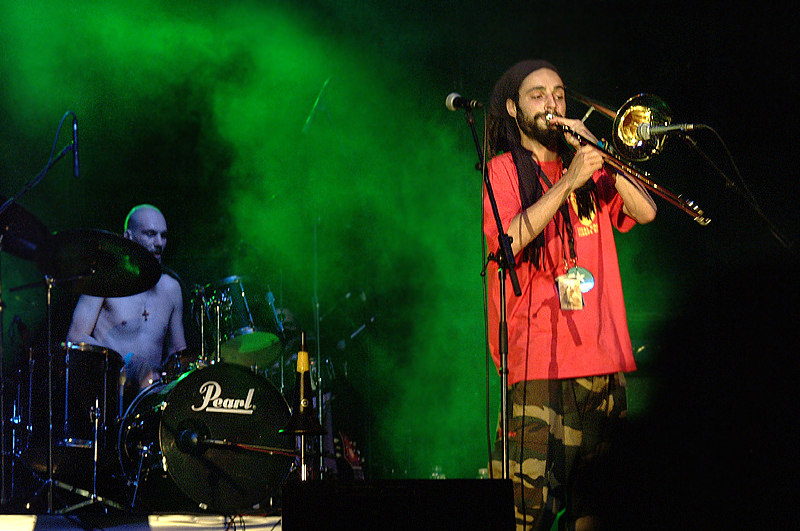
Nemanja Kojić "Kojot" performing with Eyesburn

In 2001, "Fool Control" and the track "Rizlu imaš, ličnu kartu nemaš" appeared on the soundtrack for the film Munje! in which the band appeared as a club band. As a result of their growing popularity, they received an invitation for the pre-election tours "IT'S TIME" and "USE IT (your brain)". The band started performing in former Yugoslav republics and became one of the most active bands in Serbia. During 2001, and 2002, Eyesburn performed at the EXIT festival in Novi Sad.

In late 2001, Dejan Utvar "Uti" joined the band and the band released the CD Gabau!, featuring eight songs, two of which, "No Free Time" and Foolin' I & I were recorded live in Belgrade on 22 June 2001. As guests on the album appeared Disciplin A Kitschme drummer Will Parker, percussionist Leša, and Kanda, Kodža i Nebojša vocalist Oliver Nektarijević. iN 2002, with the Jamaican dub poet Ank Steadyspear, the band recorded the album Cool Fire – Eyesburn meets Ank Steadyspear. The album was recorded separately, as Ank Steadyspear sent the already recorded vocal sections over the Internet, and the band recorded the music to the recordings. The band appeared live with Ank Steadyspear as an opening act for Lee Scratch Perry.

In 2003, the band released the album Solid, produced by Saša Janković, which was more hardcore punk-oriented than the previous release. Some people even consider it as a better release than Fool Control. At the end of 2003, Dušan Petrović joined the band, bringing new sound of saxophone which will later on influence the future releases. The band's growing popularity lead to an invitation from Max Cavalera to record together the song "Moses" on the Soulfly album Prophecy and play on the 2004 Prophecy Europe Tour. Kojić also appeared on the Soulfly album Dark Ages, on the song Innerspirit.

In March 2005, the line-up changed, when Lazić and Filipović left the band and Vukašin Marković joined the band (playing trombone and providing backing vocals) and Dalibor Vučić (playing bass). Kojić would not play trombone anymore and would be on guitar. The new album was recorded by the lineup which included Kojić, Dalibor Vučić (bass, clarinet), Aleksandar Petrović, Vukašin Marković (trombone), Dušan Petrović (baritone saxophone). How Much for Freedom?, recorded in the Novi Sad M Studio and Zemun Cameleon Studio and produced by Boban Mulunović, featured the cover version of Bob Marley & The Wailers song "So Much Trouble In The World". The album was released under the PGP-RTS record label in Serbia and Austria.

In 2007, the band went on hiatus, and Kojić pursued a solo career.

=== 2011 ===
In the spring of 2011, the band reunited in the lineup: Aleksandar Petrović "Alek" (drums), Vladimir Lazić "Laza" (bass), Nemanja Kojić "Kojot" (vocals, trombone), Dušan Petrović (saxophone), Aleksandar Nikić "Lale" (guitar), Zoran Đuroski "Đura" (guitar) and Vukašin Marković (trombon, backing vocals). The reunited Eyesburn had their first performance on 17 June 2011, at Belgrade's SKC, on a concert which was a part of the Jelen Top 10 Tour. In the fall of 2011 the 3 new songs were uploaded on YouTube: Juvenile, Dance and My Friend.

2012–2014

Winter of 2012 marked the departure of Alek from the band so Dejan Miljković "Boske" came to replace him on drums. At this time Eyesburn was very active live, having more than 60 shows in period between 2012 and 2014 in Serbia and neighboring countries. August saw the release of a new single Sudden Fall. On 15 September 2012, Eyesburn performed on Warrior's Dance festival, organized by British group The Prodigy and Exit festival, on Novi Sad's Petrovaradin fortress. In the fall band entered the studio to record new album. December marked the release of a single titled Hold This Way, one of the most played songs live.

At the end of June Eyesburn released a new single Frontline along with an official music video. Week later, the band released their seventh studio album, Reality Check. The album included some songs that were released before: Dance, My Friend, Sudden Fall, Hold This Way and Frontline. It was produced by Miloš Mihajlović and mastered by Jens Bogren. The band went on a tour in Slovenia in March 2014. In July Vukašin Marković left the band. Peacefull War got its official video in August. In December that year Eyesburn held a 20-year anniversary concert in SKC which marked the guest appearances of Goran Guraj "G", Dejan Utvar "Uti", Aleksandar Petrović Alek, Vukašin Marković and Nenad Živić. New Compilation was released, XX Years: Coming to You Live & Direct from Creation, which contained some lesser known and never released songs.

2015–2016

In the Winter of 2015 a new lineup was announced and Vladimir Lazić, Aleksandar Nikić, Dejan Miljković and Dušan Petrović left the band. New lineup consisted of Nemanja Kojić "Kojot" (vocals, trombone), Zoran Đuroski "Đura" (guitar), Slobodan Đukić "Jimi Triple-B" (bass, backing vocals) and Boris Usanović (drums). This marked the end of saxophone appearance in the band after 11 years. Band returned to "heavier" sound similar to the first album. In December 2015, Eyesburn would release a single called Dream is Over.

In July 2016, Kojić announced that the band will end their activity. The last show before the hiatus took place at 50. Gitarijada in Zaječar with Alek (drums), Laza (bass), Kojot (vocals, guitar, trombone) and Lale on some tracks (guitar).

=== 2019–2024 ===
In late 2018. the band announced reunion with the lineup from last show in 2016: Aleksandar Petrović "Alek" (drums), Vladimir Lazić "Laza" (bass), Nemanja Kojić "Kojot" (vocals, trombone) and Aleksandar Nikić "Lale" (guitar). Band rerecorded War Control and released it as a music video in March. First live show after reunion happened in Hala sportova Ranko Žeravica with Vukašin Marković as a guest. Luka Matković would sometimes play on guitar instead of "Lale" till the end of the year.

In late 2020 the band released Fool Control on vinyl (remastered by Luka Matković in Citadela Studio), marking the 20th anniversary of the album. In July 2021 Eyesburn had a recording session for Balkanrock Sessions, they recorded five songs and told interesting facts about their music life. In September 2021 Eyesburn received the first official tribute release Only We Can Solve This Problem, on which tracks were covered by Serbian bands such as Discord, Downstroy, Brat, Quasarborn, Senshi, etc. The online edition was published by Serbian Metal Portal.

The sixth full-length studio album titled Troops of Light was released for Mascom Records in July 2022. The track "Aware (Bam Bam)" was chosen for the first (video) single. The band would take a break from live shows due to sickness of members for about 9 months. 20 years since the original release of Solid, the same label reissued it for the first time on LP in March 2023. In July 2023, 10 years after original release, the band reissued double LP Reality Check.

In December 2023 the band finally did series of concerts promoting their newest record Troops of Light, playing all songs from that album but Back in the Days, News Noise and Movin' On. They also held 30th anniversary concert in March 2024, having Nenad Živić and Wacko as special guests. After numerous performances band decided to take another break in June, due to illness of a band member, cancelling all of their then upcoming gigs.

=== 2025–present ===
In February 2025, a mini-album called Dream is Over with 6 tracks recorded by the line-up that worked in the period (2015-2016) is released online for the Croatian Geenger Records. Although this is essentially unreleased Eyesburn material, it was decided to release it under the Cold Burn moniker, because in addition to Coyote and Mysterious, two members of the band Serbian sludge metal band In From the Cold (bassist Slobodan Đukić and drummer Boris Usanović) were in line-up at that time. During 2025, the band returned to play at several concerts and festivals.

As of 2026, the band is having gigs continuously. On the 3rd of January, the band played in Zappa Baza, which was the first gig in Belgrade since summer of 2025 in KST. On the 6th of June, the band held one of the biggest concerts in the last 10 years, with the band Sunshine in New Tekstil in Belgrade.

== Discography ==
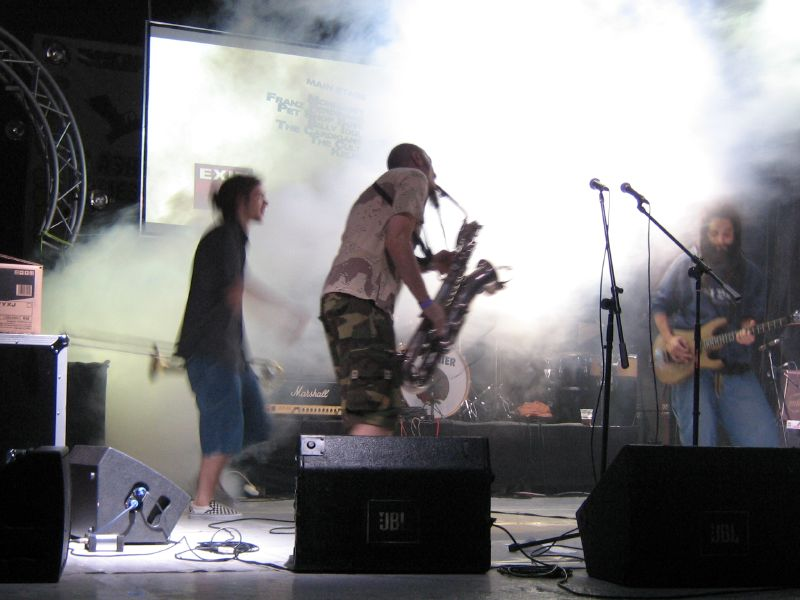
Eyesburn performing live at Exit festival in 2006

=== Studio albums ===
- Dog Life (1998)
- Fool Control (2000)
- Gabau! EP (2001)
- Solid (2003)
- How Much for Freedom? (2005)
- Reality Check (2013)
- Troops of Light (2022)

=== Live albums ===
- Freedomized (1995)

=== Single (not released on albums) ===
- Dream is Over (2015)

=== Collaborations, compilations and tribute albums ===
- Cool Fire (with Ank Steadyspear) (2002)
- XX Years: Coming to You Live & Direct from Creation (2014)
- Only We Can Solve This Problem (Tribute to Eyesburn) (2021)
- Dream is Over (as Cold Burn) (2025)

=== Other appearances ===
- "Silence Of The Twilight" (Witness Of The 1st Discussion; 1995)
- "Šejn" (Korak napred 2 koraka nazad; 1999)
- "Rizlu imaš, ličnu kartu nemaš" / "Fool Control" (Muzika iz filma 'Munje!'; 2001)
- "Junglezburn" (Metropolis 2002; 2002)
