= Nemanja Kojić (musician) =

- Also known as: Hornsman Coyote
- Born: 17 December 1975 (age 50); Belgrade, SFR Yugoslavia
- Origin: Belgrade, Serbia
- Genres: Hardcore punk, Crossover thrash, Thrash metal, Death metal, Grindcore, Reggae, Roots Reggae, Dub
- Instruments: vocals, trombone, electric guitar
- Years active: 1991-present
- Website: Official MySpace

Nemanja Kojić (born 17 December 1975, in Belgrade, Serbia), better known by his stage name Hornsman Coyote (or just Coyote), is a Serbian Reggae/Dub and Rock musician.

== Biography ==
Kojić was born in 1975 in Belgrade. He is the son of Borivoje Kojić, a famous sculptor who worked in Paris. Soon after, the family moved to Paris where Nemanja would spend the first seven years. His first language was French. He returned with his mother to Belgrade, where he had hard time adapting to school and softening his French accent. By his own account, seeing the 1985 spot for "Electric Avenue" by Eddy Grant was a revelation that would point his whole life and career towards reggae. He learned the first guitar riffs from Stanimir Lukić "Staća". When he was 13, Kojić formed a teenage band Mind Rape with friends, playing death metal. Later on, he joined hardcore punk band Dead Ideas as a guitarist. At the age of 15, he was invited by Jovan Matić to play guitar in his reggae act Del Arno Band. Experiences in reggae, punk and metal would inspire Kojić to create his own fusion of those styles.

In 1994 Kojić formed his own band, Eyesburn. The band recorded 5 albums, 1 EP and 1 collaboration dub album (with Ank Steadyspear). They had a European tour in 2004, supporting and performing a song, "Moses," with Max Cavalera and his band, Soulfly. Eyesburn have officially disbanded in 2017 over the statement on their official Facebook profile , as well as on interview with Coyote. He immediately started new Hard Rock/Stoner Rock band "Remedy", stating that he will always continue with his Reggae projects.

Coyote himself worked outside Serbia on Dark Ages, another Soulfly record, where he plays the song "Innerspirit" as guest. At the same time he worked with top Serbian hip hop producer Wikluh Sky and French MC King Kyll, making one album under the name Shappa. In Serbia, as a supporting act, he and his bandmates shared stages with artists like Burning Spear, Dub Syndicate, Lee Scratch Perry, Asian Dub Foundation, etc. Coyote also appeared as a session musician and as a guest playing the trombone, guitars or singing for many Belgrade and ex-YU bands, such as Riblja Čorba, Discord, Skarps, Irie FM, Dub Rebellion, Who See, Kanda, Kodža i Nebojša, Darkwood Dub, Block Out, E-Play, Raspect, etc.

His solo album "What next?!," garnered much success. He recorded fifteen songs, which he performed on Exit Festival (Novi Sad, Serbia) and many other festivals and solo concerts .

In 2010, he released his second solo album, entitled "Self Defend You" (2010), under the Polish label Karrot Kommando.

== Personal life ==
Coyote resides in Belgrade.
