= Goblini discography =

- Studio albums: 6
- Live albums: 3
- Singles: 2
- Music videos: 8
- Other appearances: 10

The discography of Goblini, a Serbian punk rock band from Šabac, consists of four studio albums, three live albums as well as several various artists compilations. The debut album Goblini (The Goblins), released in 1994, was recorded in the lineup Branko Golubović (vocals), Alen Jovanović (guitar), Vlada Kokotović (bass) and Nenad Divnić (drums), released on compact cassette only. During the same year, not satisfied with the album production, the band re-recorded a part of the material on the second studio album, Istinite priče I deo (True Stories Part I), featuring the new drummer Nedeljko Nedić "Meketa".

The next release, a live cassette KST Live 31.08.'95 featured a new drummer, Zoran Jević "Fric", and an additional guitarist, Leonid Pilipović, also known as Leo fon Punkerstein. The lineup recorded the next studio album, U magnovenju (In the flash), released in 1996, the first to appear on compact disc. The album followed a tour during which Pilipović was replaced by Saša Šetka and the new drummer became Vladimir Cinklocki "Cina". In 1998, the recordings from the tour were released on the double album Turneja u magnovenju 96/97 (In the flash tour 96/97), featuring a CD reissue of Istinite priče I deo, and five tracks from Goblini as bonus tracks, on the second CD. The live CD featured a bonus studio track "Punk's not dead".

The lineup Golubović, Jovanović, Kokotović and drummer Milan Arnautović recorded the band's final studio album Re Contra, released in 1999. In 2001, the band ceased to exist. The recordings from the Re Contra tour were released in 2004 as Najbolje priče (The best stories), featuring an unreleased studio track "Pričaš" ("You're talking"). The lineup which disbanded in 2001 reunited in 2010 and recorded a single which was released on August, during a short reunion tour. The band also is to record a documentary about the band in Radio Television of Vojvodina production.

== Studio albums ==
Year	Album details
1994	Goblini: Released: 1994; Label: Music YUser; Format: MC
1994	Istinite priče I deo: Released: 1994; Label: Metropolis Records; Format: MC, CD
1996	U magnovenju: Released: 1996; Label: Metropolis Records One Records (2002 reissue); Format: MC, CD
1999	Re Contra: Released: 1999; Label: Metropolis Records; Format: MC, CD
2013	Roba s greškom: Released: November 2013; Label: Long Play; Format: CD
2019	Jednina: Released: December 2019; Label: Metropolis Records; Format: CD

== Live albums ==
Year	Album details
1995	KST Live 31.08.'95: Released: 1995; Label: Mortal Combat Records; Format: MC
1998	Turneja u magnovenju 96/97: Released: 1998; Label: Metropolis Records; Format: MC, CD
2004	Najbolje priče: Released: 2004; Label: Multimedia Records; Format: CD

== Singles ==
Year	Album details
2010	Crno na belo: Released: 2010; Label: Šabački Letnji Festival; Format: CD
2010	"U odbrani zla": Released: 2011; Label: Nocturne Magazine; Format: digital download

== Music videos ==
Title	Album / single	Released
"Cipjonka"	Istinite priče I deo	1994
"U magnovenju"	U magnovenju	1996
"Anja, volim te"	U magnovenju	1996
"Bolje soko u ruci nego guska u krevetu"	U magnovenju	1996
"Kraj"	U magnovenju	1996
"Punk's not dead"	Turneja u magnovenju 96/97	1998
"Daleki put"	Re Contra	1999
"Ne trebam nikome"	Re Contra	1999
"Voz"'	Re Contra	1999
"Luna"'	Crno na belo	2010

== Other appearances ==
Title	Album	Released
"Cipjonka" / "eLeSDi se vraca kuci"	Punk! Oi!! Yu	1996
"Cipjonka"	Ustani i kreni	1996
"Anja, volim te"	Zgaga Rock Festival - Litija 1996	1996
"Ima nas"	Nas slušaju svi, mi ne slušamo nikoga!	1997
"Ona misli da zna" / "U magnovenju" / "eLeSDi se vraca kuci"	No Border Jam 4 & 5	1997
"In memoriam" / "Kad Sunce opet zađe" / "eLeSDi se vraća kući"	Paket Aranžman - Svi protiv svih	1998
"Daleki put"	Metropolis vol.2	2002
"Cipjonka"'	Metropolis vol.1	2002
"Daleki put"	Od Čivija do Goblina - Volume one	2006
"Ciponjka"	Groovanje devedesete uživo	2009
