= Videosex =

Yugoslav synthpop group

- Videosex in 1985, from left to right: Nina Sever, Janez Križaj, Anja Rupel and Iztok Turk

Background information
- Origin: Ljubljana, SR Slovenia, SFR Yugoslavia
- Genres: Synth-pop; jazz pop; electronic music
- Years active: 1982–1992
- Labels: ZKP RTLJ, Helidon, Dallas Records
- Past members: Anja Rupel; Iztok Turk; Janez Križaj; Matjaž Kosi; Nina Sever; Andrija Pušić

Videosex was a Yugoslav synth-pop band formed in Ljubljana in 1982. The band was one of the most prominent acts of the Yugoslav synth-pop scene.

The group was established in 1982, but the steady lineup was formed in 1983, consisting of Anja Rupel (vocals), Janez Križaj (bass guitar), Iztok Turk (drums), Matjaž Kosi (keyboards) and Nina Sever (keyboards). The band soon gained attention from the Yugoslav public, and their debut album Videosex '84 brought them nationwide popularity. During the following years, the band had a number of mainstream hits, at the same time maintaining artistic direction in their work, introducing elements of jazz into their songs with their second studio album Lacrimae Christi. The group ended their activity in 1992, Rupel continuing her career as a solo artist.

== History ==
=== 1982–1992 ===
The group was formed in 1982, but did not have a steady lineup until the spring of 1983, when keyboardist Matjaž Kosi (formerly of Martin Krpan), drummer Iztok Turk (formerly of Kuzle and Otroci Socializma; in the latter band he played guitar), and bass guitarist Janez Križaj (formerly of Otroci Socializma) invited keyboardist Nina Sever and vocalist Anja Rupel to join the group. Rupel, daughter of flutist and Ljubljana Academy of Music professor Feđa Rupel and schlager singer Sonja Berce, was at the time of Videosex formation a high school student and, beside singing in children's choirs and learning to play flute in a music school, had no previous experience as a performer. The band was named Videosex after the idea of Turk and Dejan Knez of Laibach. The name was initially disliked by Rupel, who, fearing her parents reaction, proposed the name Rafael (Raphael).

The band had their debut performance in Belgrade's Students' Cultural Center, performing on joint concert with punk rock band Otroci Socializma and post-punk band Katarina II. Their first performance in a larger venue was in September 1983 on the Novi rock (New Rock) festival in Ljubljana's Križanke. The band soon gained a loyal fanbase with their synth-pop sound. At the end of 1983, they published their debut release, the 7-inch single with the songs "Moja mama" ("My Mom") and "Kako bih volio da si tu" ("How I Wish You Were Here"), the latter featuring Turk on vocals.

In March 1984, the band released their first album, Videosex '84, through ZKP RTLJ. The album brought the group's first hit, "Detektivska priča" ("Detective Story"), a synth-pop track with lyrics about detectives searching for a female serial killer. Beside the mentioned song, the album featured the songs "Ana", "Neonska reklama" ("Neon Sign"), the songs previously released on the 7-inch single, and several instrumental tracks. The album brought nationwide media attention to the band, with part of the press describing Anja Rupel as a sex symbol. After the album release, Matjaž Kosi left the group and formed the pop band Moulin Rouge. The band continued with one keyboardist only, appearing on the YU Rock Moment festival in Zagreb. In the autumn of 1984, they appeared on the MESAM festival and were the opening band on Parni Valjak tour.

In March 1985, Videosex released their second album, Lacrimae Christi (Latin for Christ's Tears). The title track was a version of a piece by German composer Carl Bohm. The album featured Bijelo Dugme keyboardist Laza Ristovski as guest. Lacrimae Christi introduced jazz elements into the band's sound. The songs "Sivi dan" ("Gloomy Day") and noir-inspired "Tko je zgazio gospođu mjesec" ("Who Ran Over Mrs. Moon") became nationwide hits. The album also featured the song "Pejd' ga pogledat, Anja" ("Go See Him, Anja"), originally written for Otroci Socializma by their frontman Brane Bitenc under the title "Pejd' ga pogledat, Brane" ("Go See Him, Brane"). After the release of the album, Nina Sever left the band, and was replaced by Andrija Pušić (formerly of Na Lepem Prijazni) and Otroci Socializma). During the year, Rupel took part in the YU Rock Misija project, a Yugoslav contribution to Live Aid, singing in the song "Za milion godina", and Videosex performed on the corresponding charity concert held at the Red Star Stadium in Belgrade.

After the suggestion of Lačni Franz leader Zoran Predin, the band recorded the mini-album Svet je zopet mlad (The World Is Young Again) with covers of evergreens of the Slovene 1960s pop scene. The recording featured drummer Dadi Krašnar (of Miladojka Youneed) and the RTV Ljubljana Dance Orchestra. The album was released in 1987, and brought the hits "Orion" (originally performed by Katja Levstik), "Vozi me vlak v daljave" ("The Train Takes Me Far Away", originally performed by Beti Jurković) and "Zemlja pleše" ("The Earth Is Dancing", originally performed by Marijana Deržaj). In 1987, Rupel starred in Franci Slak's films The Felons, and in 1988, she made a guest appearance on the Laibach album Let It Be, singing lead vocals in their version of "Across the Universe", also appearing in the song video directed by Boris Miljković and Branko Dimitrijević and aired on MTV.

In 1988, Nina Sever returned to the band, but Križaj stopped being a permanent member, continuing to work with the group in studio only. In 1990, Rupel cooperated with Laibach once again, appearing on the EP Sympathy for the Devil, singing lead vocals in one of Laibach's versions of "Sympathy for the Devil". In 1991, the band released their last studio album, Ljubi in sovraži (Love and Hate). The album recording featured numerous guest musicians: Andrija Pušić, Dadi Krašnar, drummer Ratko Divjak (formerly of Time and September), bass guitarist Jani Hace, guitarist and percussionist Boris Romih (formerly of Begnagrad), saxophonist Mario Marolt, and others. Part of the album lyrics were taken from an anthology of world children's poetry. A year after the album release, the band ended their activity.

=== Post breakup ===
After Videosex disbanded, Rupel continued her career as a solo artist. She has recorded seven pop-oriented solo albums. Most of the songs on the albums were composed by her husband, Aleš Klinar, leader of the band Agropop, while the lyrics were written by Rupel. She hosted several music shows on Slovene television and radio stations. For her 2016 compilation Opus she recorded a new version of "Kako bih volio da si tu" with Psihomodo Pop frontman Davor Gobac. She cooperated with Klinar's band Rock Partyzani (Rock Partysans) on their albums, and the two also wrote songs for other performers.

Both Turk and Križaj dedicated themselves to music production. Turk produced albums by Laibach and other alternative acts, while Križaj produced mostly albums by mainstream acts from Slovenia and Croatia. In 1998, Turk formed the house group Rotor, which featured Pissmakers bass guitarist Jani Hace and drummer Sergej Ranđelović and Miladojka Youneed saxophonist Mario Marolt, releasing two albums with them, Rotosphere (2000) and Phonophobia (2005). In Pissmakers Turk played the synthesizer and programmed the rhythm machine. He was a member of the alternative band 300,000 V.K., described as the "sound division of Laibach kunst". He wrote music for several documentary and short films.

Nina Sever worked as a piano teacher for a period of time, and later started working in the Dallas Records marketing department.

In 1997, the double compilation album Arhiv (Archive) was released. The album featured songs from all four studio albums, in addition to eight previously unreleased tracks. The unreleased songs were recorded during ten years of the band's career, but had previously remained unreleased as the members had been dissatisfied with them. The compilation included the song "Ti si moja roža" ("You Are My Rose"), originally recorded by the group as their entry for the Jugovizija contest, but later dropped.

In 2019, the band's first album was reissued on vinyl by Dutch record label Rush Hour.

== Legacy ==
In 1996, Serbian punk rock band Goblini covered the song "Kako bih volio da si tu", under the title "Anja, volim te" ("Anja, I Love You"), on their album U magnovenju (In a Trance). In 2003, Croatian pop band E.N.I. covered "Ti si moja roža" and Videosex version of "Orion" on their album Da Capo. The same song was covered in 2010 by Slovenian singer Alenka Godec on her album So najlepše pesmi že napisane II (The Most Beautiful Songs Have Already Been Written II). In 2007, Slovenian rock band Big Foot Mama covered the song "Moja mama" on their album Važno, da zadane. Serbian pop band Frajle covered the Videosex version of the song "Zemlja pleše" for their 2017 album Ljubav na dar (Love as a Gift).

In 2015, Videosex '84 album was ranked no.58 on the 100 Greatest Yugoslav Albums list published by the Rolling Stone Croatian edition.

In 2006, the "Detektivska priča" track was ranked no.57 in B92's Top 100 Yugoslav songs poll.

== Members ==
- Matjaž Kosi - keyboards, synthesizers (1982–1984)
- Janez Križaj - bass guitar, programming (1982–1989)
- Anja Rupel - vocals, flute (1983–1992)
- Nina Sever - keyboards, synthesizers (1983–1985; 1988–1992)
- Iztok Turk - drums, programming (1982–1992)

== Discography ==
=== Studio albums ===
- Videosex '84 (1984)
- Lacrimae Christi (1985)
- Svet je zopet mlad (1987)
- Ljubi in sovraži (1991)

=== Compilation albums ===
- Arhiv (1997)

=== Singles ===
- "Moja mama" / "Kako bih volio da si tu" (1983)
