= Milan Petrović =

Milan Petrović may refer to:

- Milan Petrović (musician) (born 1976), Serbian keyboard player, songwriter and composer
  - Milan Petrovic Quartet
- Milan Petrović (football coach), Slovenian football manager
- Milan Petrović (computer scientist)
