= Videosex '84 =

Yugoslav synthpop album

Studio album by Videosex
- Released: 27 February 1984
- Studios: Studio Top Ten, Ljubljana, SR Slovenia
- Genres: Synthpop; new wave
- Length: 33:20
- Languages: Slovenian, Serbo-Croatian
- Label: ZKP RTLJ

Videosex chronology
Videosex '84 (1984)	Lacrimae Christi (1985)

Videosex '84 (sometimes simply known as Videosex) is the debut album by the Yugoslav Synthpop band Videosex. It was released on 27 February 1984 by ZKP RTLJ with subsequent reissues in 2009 and 2019.

The album brought the band media attention in Yugoslavia and contained several hits, including "Ana", "Moja mama" and "Detektivska Priča", a song about a detective searching for a female serial killer. The album has many songs which were released as singles earlier in 1983. The album cover is designed to replicate an Airmail envelope.

== Release ==
The album was released in on the 27 February 1984 on vinyl. It was again rereleased on vinyl by Dutch record label Rush Hour on in 2019.

The album was released on CD for the first time in 2009.

== Reception and legacy ==
Professional ratings
Review scores
Source	Rating
muzika.hr	5/5 stars
Soundguardian	5/5 stars

In 2015, the Croatian edition of Rolling Stone ranked the album at 58 on their list of the 100 Greatest Yugoslav Albums.

In 2006, the song "Detektivska Priča" was listed at 57th place on B92's list of the Top 100 Domestic Songs.

=== Covers ===
In 1996, the Serbian punk rock band Goblini released a cover of the song ‘Kako bih volio da si tu’ under the title ‘Anja, volim te’ as part of their album U magnovenju. In 2006, the Slovenian band Big Rock Mama covered the song ‘Moja Mama’ as part of their album Važno, da zadane.

== Track listing ==
Side one
No.	Title	Length
1.	"Detektivska priča"	3:07
2.	"Ana"	3:13
3.	"Moja mama" (Boris Balant in Dare Kaurič)	3:44
4.	"U sjeni egzotičnih trava"	2:57
5.	"1001 noć"	3:23

Side two
No.	Title	Length
6.	"Kako bih volio da si tu"	2:23
7.	"Videosex"	3:09
8.	"Neonska reklama"	3:35
9.	"Neonska reklama 2"	7:49
Total length:		33:20

== Personnel ==
=== Videosex ===
- Anja Rupel — vocals
- Iztok Turk — drums
- Janez Križaj — bass guitar
- Matjaž Kosi — keyboards
- Nina Sever — keyboards on "1001 noć" and "Neonska reklama"

=== Others ===
- Rudi Skočir — Design
- Ivo Umek — Editor
- Jure Robnežnik — Chief Editor
- Dare Novak — Recording
