= Marčelo =

Serbian rapper

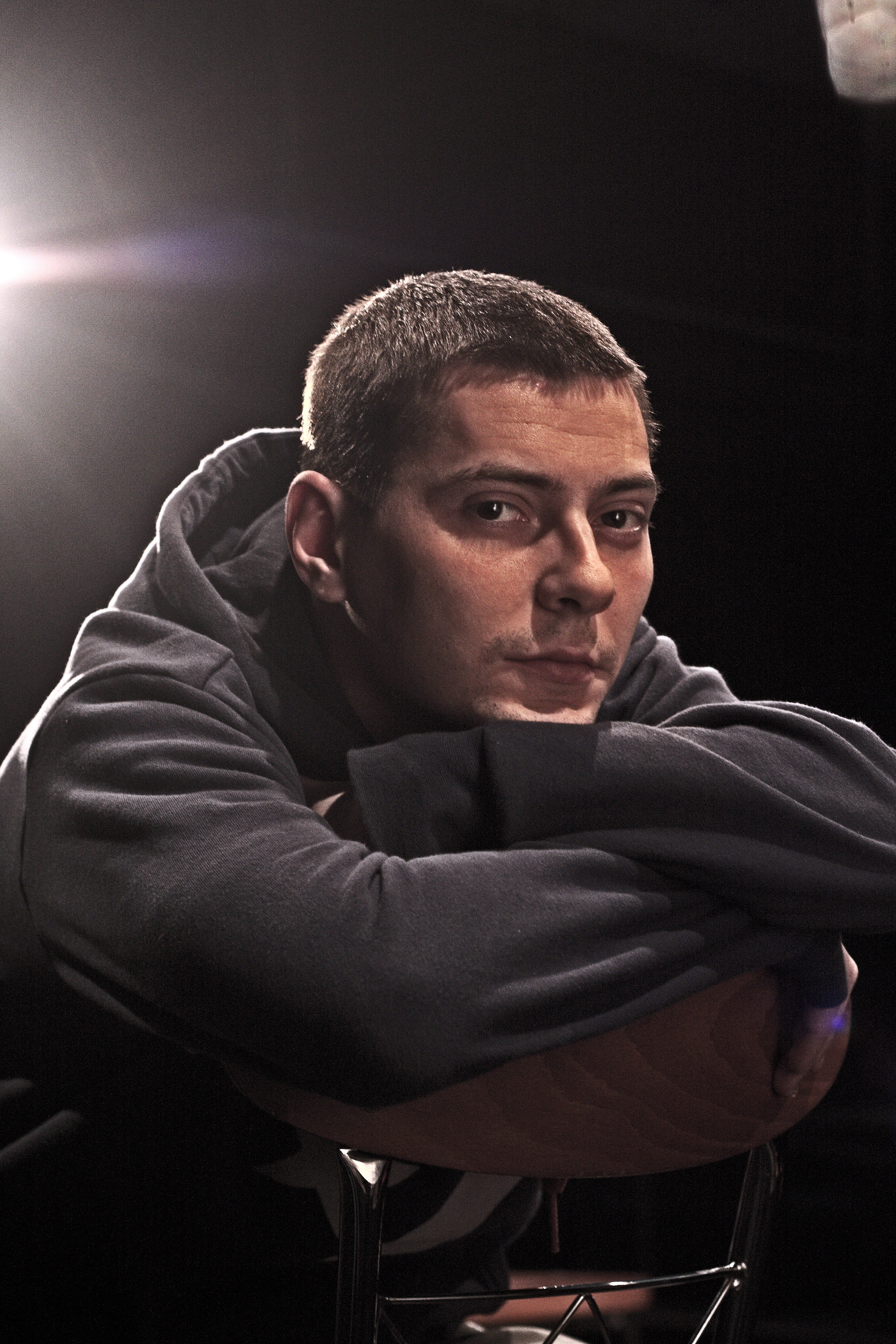
- Marčelo in 2013

Background information
- Born: Marko Šelić; 22 January 1983 (age 43); Paraćin, SFR Yugoslavia
- Origin: Belgrade, Serbia
- Genres: Hip hop; conscious hip hop
- Occupations: Rapper; singer; songwriter; writer; columnist; editor
- Years active: 1997–present
- Labels: Lampshade Media; Multimedia Records; Bassivity

Marko Šelić (Serbian: Марко Шелић; born 22 January 1983), also known as Marčelo (Serbian: Марчело), is a Serbian rapper, singer and writer, known for his socially conscious lyrics and eclectic approach to musical arrangements through hip-hop music. A Paraćin native, he moved to Belgrade, where he has had great success over the years, and became one of the most prominent Serbian hip hop artists. He has won numerous awards, including two Serbian Oscars of Popularity, two Indexi Awards and an MTV Platinum Award.

== Career ==
=== Rise ===
Marčelo started making hip hop music in 1997, though his first significant contributions came out in 1999, with a demo band called Rhyme Animal. In order to pursue his solo career, Marčelo stepped out of Rhyme Animal in 2001, and started to work with Oneya, the founder of Bassivity Music and one of the leading producers on the Serbian hip hop scene. Oneya recognized his full potential and Marčelo signed with Bassivity in 2002. The first opportunity for a wider audience to hear and recognize his work came with 2003's Bassivity Mixtape Vol.1, to which he contributed two tracks, Definicija (feat. Shorty) and Snovidjenje.

=== Debut album (De Facto) ===
His debut album, De Facto, also released in 2003 on the Bassivity label, came out to both public and critical acclaim, and he was branded as the voice of a generation. The album was full of criticism of Serbian society at the dawn of the new millennium and personal themes, which were delivered in a very sincere manner. In his single and video, Kuća Na Promaji (A House On A Range), he deals with the assassination of Serbia's prime minister in 2003, police brutality, corruption and alienation amongst young people in the country. It was the best-selling hip hop album that year in Serbia-Montenegro and the first post-war record that included collaborations between the new generation of music acts from former Yugoslavia: Edo Maajka (Bosnia-Herzegovina), Elemental (Croatia), Škabo (Serbia), "Bata Barata" ex Shorty (Serbia), Don Trialeon ex Trial (Serbia) and Disciplinska Komisija (Bosnia-Herzegovina).

=== Puzzle Shock! ===
Despite the success of his debut album, Marčelo was unable to settle his differences with the record company, so he transferred from Bassivity to Multimedia Records (Universal Music licensee in Serbia-Montenegro) in early 2005. In December the same year, Marčelo released his second album Puzzle Shock! (Multimedia Records), which featured the singles "Šarada" (Masquerade), "Otkucaji" (Heartbeats), "Pozerište" and "Novi Vavilon" (New Babylon). It topped the charts upon its release. This time his main collaborator was Dragoljub Marković alias Dr. Dra (ex-member of rock-bands such as Ništa ali logopedi, Block Out, X-Centar), who added some vocal parts, played various instruments and produced the album. Marčelo also did some co-producing and arrangement work. The resulting sound was a hip hop with strong rock, jazz and funk influences, which estranged a minority of fans who loved what they considered to be the pure hip hop sound of De Facto, but it gained the admiration of many people unfamiliar with rap and hip hop. Marčelo toured the country to promote the new album with a backing band Shock! Orchestra, taking part along the way in the EXIT 06 tour of the countries of the former Yugoslavia, and sold out a venue Serbia's capital, Belgrade. At his gigs, he is supported by several big names on the Serbian hip hop scene: Wikluh Sky, Ministar Lingvista (Real Skllz) and Nancy. With the addition of DJ Raid, a talented DJ based in Switzerland, this is the line-up of The Filter Crew. His first novel "Zajedno Sami" (Together Alone) was published during February 2008.

=== Treća Strana Medalje ===
His third album, Treća strana medalje (The Third Side Of The Medal), was released in December 2008.

=== Deca i Sunce ===
His fourth album, Deca i Sunce (Children and the Sun) was released on 24 December 2010, under the moniker "Marčelo & Filteri". Album was released in parallel with his novel "Zajedno sami" (Together Alone) and poem collection "O ljudima, psima i mišima" (About men, dogs and mice).

=== Napet Šou ===
On 31 October 2012 Marčelo released a song called "Čep" (Cork) within campaign of the non-governmental organization ASTRA, targeted towards raising public awareness and encouragement of competent authorities to be involved in fighting against human trafficking and work exploitation.

In 2013, he was cast in the Serbian-language version of Turbo as the title character, starring in the dub alongside prominent actors including Radovan Vujović and Dragan Mićanović. On 9 October 2013 it was revealed that Marčelo and his crew are working on new book-album titled "Napet Šou" (Tense Show) and that release date is expected on 1 October. 2014. The album will have 18 tracks which are being recorded with contribution from over 30 artists. Three songs are confirmed to be singles from the new album "Laž" (The Lie) i "Pegla" (Flatiron) and "Komplikovani" (Complicated).

Book-album was released on 1 October 2014. The Album contains 19 tracks while book contains lyrics, photos made during the album's conception. Along Marčelo, authors of texts in the book are theater director Kokan Mladenović, writers David Albahari, Mihajlo Pantić and Pavle Zelić, aphorists Dalibor Đorđević, journalist and music critic Petar Janjatović, columnist Draža Petrović, peace worker Milan Colić, psychologist and psychotherapist Vladan Beara and ex NGO Astra coordinator Elena Krsmanović.

Following the release of the album, along with his Filter Crew collaborators, Marčelo formed a touring band to follow them in promotion of the album. Napeti Quintet (Tense Quintet) consisted of experienced Jazz musicians, Violinist Filip Krumes, Pianist Aleksandar Jovanović Šljuka, Bassist Marko Fabry, Drummer Aleksandar Cvetković Drama and Saxophonist Max Kočetov.

=== Nojeva Varka ===
On 30 December 2019, through his official Facebook page, Marčelo announced the title of his next album, Nojeva Varka, with release date in 2020. The album will have 13 tracks written and performed by his Filter Crew and Napeti Quintet.

== Discography ==
- De Facto (Bassivity, 2003)
- Puzzle Shock! (Multimedia Records, 2005)
- Treća strana medalje (Multimedia Records, 2008)
- Deca i Sunce (Multimedia Records, 2010)
- Napet Šou (Lampshade Media (album); Laguna (book), 2014)
- Nojeva Varka (Lampshade Media, 2021)

== Literary works ==
- 2008 Zajedno sami (novel)
- 2009 O ljudima, psima i mišima (short story collection)
- 2010 Zaglavljeni, a play based on Zajedno sami, with Branislava Ilić
- 2012 Malterego, knjiga prva: Rubikova stolica (novel)
- 2014 Napet šou (collection of columnist-essayist works)
- 2017 Malterego, knjiga druga: Higijena nesećanja (novel)
- 2026 Malterego, knjiga treca: Intronaut (novel)

== Awards and nominations ==
=== MTV Europe Music Awards ===
Year	Award	Category	Result
2008	MTV Europe Music Awards	Best Adriatic Act	Nominated

=== Serbian Oscars of Popularity ===
Year	Award	Category	Result
2014	Serbian Oscar of Popularity	Best Hip-hop Artist	Won
2015	Serbian Oscar of Popularity	Best Hip-hop Artist	Won

== See also ==
Serbian hip hop
