= Rare (Serbian band) =

Serbian alternative rock band

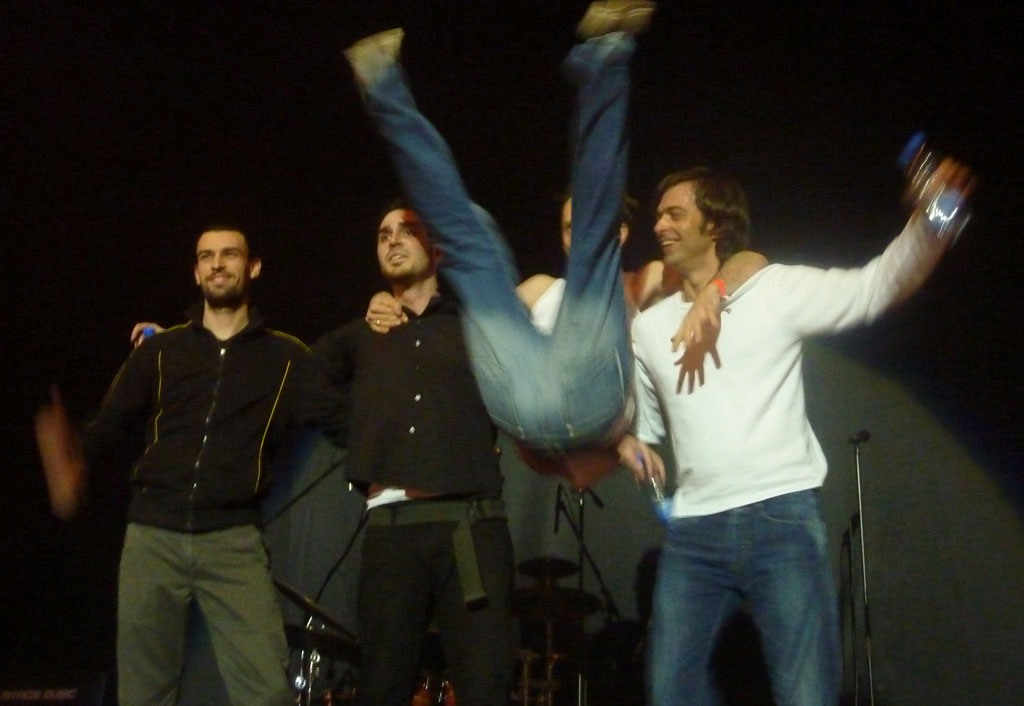
- Rare after performing as an opening act for Guano Apes at the Belgrade Arena in April 2011

Background information
- Also known as: Crni Biseri
- Origin: Belgrade, Serbia
- Genres: Alternative rock, hardcore punk, post-grunge, trip hop, funk
- Years active: 1998 – present
- Labels: MCM, J.O.S. Virus, Shuteye Records, Multimedia Records
- Members: Nemanja Subotić; Mirko Luković; Branislav Radojković; Goran Milošević
- Past members: Dario Janošević

Rare are a Serbian alternative rock band from Belgrade.

== History ==
=== 2000s ===
The band, formed in 1998 by Mirko Luković (vocals), Nemanja Subotić (guitar), Branislav Radojković (bass) and Dario Janošević (drums). Having won the Urban Demo festival in 2000, the band got the opportunity to record their debut studio album.

The debut album Breathing, released by both MCM and J.O.S. Virus independent record labels in 2002 and produced by Nikola Vranjković, brought sixteen songs, all of which, except the track "Ja sam taj koji čeka" ("I Am the One Who Is Waiting"), for which a promotional video had been recorded, featured the lyrics written in English language. Recorded at the Belgrade Akademija and Vitas studios from July until October 2001, the recordings featured guest appearances by Dragan Krstić "Gaga" (congas), Lazar Čolović (goblet drum), former Eyesburn member Aleksandar Petrović "Mengele", former Ništa Ali Logopedi and Block Out member Dragoljub Marković (keyboards, backing vocals), Bojan Đorđević "Suid" (rap vocals) and Uroš Petković "Frc" (scratches). The album style featured a diverse range of musical influences, including hardcore punk, trip hop, funk and grunge, also showing an interesting approach in making ballads.

During the same year, the band recorded a theme song for the Mile vs. tranzicija (Mile vs. Transition) TV show, and the soundtrack for the BITEF theatre play Reflection. The band had recorded twenty five songs for the Mile vs. tranzicija, and appeared as the band Crni Biseri (Black Pearls, the name being a reference to the former Yugoslav beat band Crni Biseri) in the show. The following year, the band released a CD single for the song "Zrno" ("Grain"), also featuring multimedia material consisting of a music video for the song and the band photographs. The song had also appeared on the Kad porastem biću kengur (When I Grow Up I Will Be a Kangaroo) movie soundtrack. During the same year, the band also appeared on the American various artists compilation album MMM Disc, released by Shuteye Records, with the song "Only Progression Within".

In 2004, a former Plejboj member Goran Milošević became the new drummer with whom the band recorded the second studio album, Joyz, featuring more songs in Serbian language, even though the lyrics in English were still dominant. The album, released by Multimedia Records on June 10, 2006, was co-produced by Luković and Predrag Milanović and featured guest appearances by Aleksandra Kovač (backing vocals) Dragoljub Marković (backing vocals), Željko Lazić (clarinet), Boban Stošić (upright bass), Bojan Ivković (tapan), Srdjan Tanasković (keyboards), Feđa Franklin (percussion), Katarina Milošević (violin) and Miloš Petrović (violin).

=== 2010s ===
On April 10, 2011, the band performed as an opening act for the Guano Apes concert at the Belgrade Arena. In the meantime, the band had started preparing the third studio album, with the work title Kapric (Caprice) and recorded more than forty songs, described by Bane Radojković as "the most creative and mature effort so far".

On June 20, 2015, the band performed as an opening band on Smak concert at Belgrade's Ušće park.

== Discography ==
=== Studio albums ===
- Breathing (2002)
- Joyz (2006)

=== Singles ===
- "Zrno" (2003)

=== Other appearances ===
- "Only Progression Within" (MMM Disc; 2003)
