= Puzzle Shock! =

Studio album by Marčelo
- Released: 7 December 2005
- Recorded: 2004–2005
- Genre: Hip hop
- Length: 67:04
- Label: Multimedia Records
- Producer: Dragoljub "Dr Dra" Marković and Marčelo

Marčelo chronology
De Facto (2003)	Puzzle Shock! (2005)	Treća strana medalje (2008)

Puzzle Shock! is the second studio album by the Serbian hip-hop artist Marčelo. Released in 2005, the 16-track album features various artists from Serbia and Croatia performing in different music styles, including pop and rock/rock 'n' roll. The album improved on the success of Marčelo's debut album De Facto.

== Track listing ==
#	Title	Production	Featured artists	Time
1	"Sve Oke"	Music and arrangements: Risbo (BinW Productions); Floors, scratching and introductory music: DJ Raid		4:51
2	"Šarada"	Arrangements: Dr Dra and Marčelo; Piano: Siniša Mitrović; El. piano, synth, bass and el. guitar: Dr Dra; Drums: Marko "Nafta" Milivojević; Sound effects: Vojkan Čolić; Sampling: Mysterious; Rhythm section: Dada		5:31
3	"Senke"	Music: Amitto and Wikluh Sky; Arrangements: Wikluh Sky and Marčelo; Scratching: DJ Raid	Marčelo and Ministar Lingvista (background vocals)	4:06
4	"Pozerište"	Music: Đera; Scratching: DJ Raid; Arrangements: Đera, Marčelo and Dr Dra	Dr Dra (background vocals)	3:55
5	"Geto!"	Music: Marčelo and Dr Dra	Marčelo and Dr Dra (background vocals)	1:23
6	"Otkucaji"	Music: Wikluh Sky; Arrangements: Wikluh Sky and Marčelo; Drums: Marko "Nafta" Milivojević; Bass: Milen "Zmo" Zlatanović; Acoustic guitar: Namanja Popović; Synth: Dr Dra	Wikluh Sky	2:59
7	"Uskurativna"	Music: Marvel; Arrangements: Marčelo and Dr Dra; El. piano: Dr Dra	Dr Dra (background vocals)	5:12
8	"Gola Vera"	Music: X-Centar; Arrangements: X-Centar and Marčelo; Scratching: DJ Raid; Synth: Dr Dra; Drums: Vladan "Cvek" Cvetković; Bass: Milen "Zmo" Zlatanović; Guitars: Zoran "Kokan" Kokanović and Stanimir "Staća" Lukić	X-Centar; Mirko "Roki" Arsenijević (background vocals)	3:37
9	"Nedođija BB"	Music: Oneya; Arrangements: Marčelo, Dr Dra and Oneya; Sampling: "Moj stari i ja" by Arsen Dedić		4:55
10	Novi Vavilon	Music: Oneya; Floors: DJ Raid; Arrangements: Oneya, Marčelo, Dr Dra and Ana Đokić	Miljana Džunić (background vocal in chorus); Marčelo, Dr Dra, Danica Radman (crowd vocals)	3:31
11	"Ziljave p?*!:)"	Music: Sett; Arrangements: Sett, Marčelo and Dr Dra	Škabo; Dr Dra and Nensi (background vocals); Introductory vocals from interview with Ajs Nigrutin and Timbe (of Bad Copy)	5:58
12	"Više"	Sampling, programming: Misty; Floors, scratching: DJ Raid; Arrangements: Marčelo and Dr Dra; Synth, bass: Dr Dra; Drums: Marko "Nafta" Milivojević	Dr Dra (background vocals)	3:10
13	"Sveti Bes"	Arrangements: Marčelo; Music: DJ Raid; Choir arrangements: Danica Radman, Dr Dra, Marčelo	Boksi, Gaga, Dr Dra (choir)	6:46
14	"Filter"	Music: Preeview; Floors, scratching: DJ Raid; Arrangements: Marčelo	Ministar Lingvista, Flip-Flop, Timbe (Timjah)	4:57
15	"Kola!"	Music: Marčelo, Dr Dra	Marčelo, Dr Dra (background vocals)	1:20
16	"Rekvijem"	Piano sample: (unknown); Arrangements: Marčelo and Dr Dra; Bass: Đera; El. drums: Marko "Nafta" Milivojević; Synth: Dr Dra, Marko "Nafta" Milivojević; El. violin: Ana Đokić	Remi (of Elemental), Ana Đokić	4:46

== Other ==
- "Sve Oke" includes an introduction with scratching by DJ Raid.
- "Nedođija BB" was remade and re-edited for the album. The original version was released in 2003. on the compilation/mixtape album "Ulice Vol. 1".
