= Svarog (band) =

Serbian metal band

- Svarog performing in the movie Geto in 1995

Background information
- Origin: Belgrade, Serbia, FR Yugoslavia
- Genres: Doom metal, sludge metal, hardcore punk
- Years active: 1993–1996
- Labels: Gong, Multimedia Records
- Past members: Boško Blažić; Milan Barković; Vladimir Vilovski; Zoran Đuroski
- Website: Official Myspace

Svarog (Serbian Cyrillic: Сварог) was a Serbian sludge/doom metal band from Belgrade, notable as one of the first representatives of the genres in Serbia.

== History ==
The band was formed in November 1993 by the guitarist Zoran Đuroski "Đura Mysterious" (a former Brainstorm, Crist, SMF, Pussycat and Overdose member), vocalist Boško Blažić (a former Sunrise member), drummer Vladimir Vilovski "Šola" (a former Brainstorm and Sick Mother Fakers member) and bassist Milan Barković "Bare" (a former Pussycat member).

The November 5, 1994 performance, held at the Belgrade KST club, was recorded for a live album, released as Smor (Dull) on the band's own independent record label, named Gong, in 1995. The album, available on compact cassette only, featured thirteen tracks, including cover versions of the Discharge "Final Bloodbath" and Black Sabbath song "Electric Funeral. The album production was done by the band themselves, with the help of the sound engineer Ivan Brusić, with whom the band had mastered and produced the recording at the Belgrade Atelje Studio.

During the same year, the band appeared as performers in the movie Geto (Ghetto), starring the Električni Orgazam drummer Goran Čavajde "Čavke", about the underground Belgrade rock scene, with a music video for the song "Trial Song". A live recording of the song "War (Is Within"), made at the November 11, 1995, Belgrade KST performance the band had with the Gornji Milanovac band Bjesovi, was released on the various artists compilation Groovanje devedesete uživo (Roaring Nineties Live) by Multimedia Records in 2009.

During the spring of 1996, vocalist Boško Blažić left the band, and Svarog became a trio with Đuroski taking over the vocal duties. Same year, on May, the band went on a tour of Slovenia with the bands Love Hunters, Ništa Ali Logopedi and Goblini. The band even started recording material for the debut studio album, however, after the recording of only two songs, the band disbanded.

== Post-breakup ==
Having left Svarog, Blažić quit his musical career. Vilovski continued playing drums for various bands and appeared as guest vocalist for his old band Sick Mother Fakers on their album Lako ćemo. Bassist Milan Barković started working as a sound engineer and producer, founding his Bare Wired studio in Zemun. Đuroski made guest appearances on several albums during the 1990s, including the Block Out 1996 album Godina sirotinjske zabave, Sick Mother Fakers 1998 album Lako ćemo, and Goblini 1999 album Re Contra. During the early 2000s he had joined the band Eyesburn, appearing on the albums Cool Fire, and How Much for Freedom?. With Eyesburn, he appeared as guest on the Soulfly DVD Live in Warsaw, Poland – July 13, 2005 which was released with the album Conquer in 2008. He had also started working as a producer and sound engineer, producing the Bjesovi album Na živo in 2002, Ventolin album Unrest in 2003 and Scraps album Self-Command in 2006. He appeared as sound engineer on the Bjesovi 2003 video release Live at KST, Belgrade May 31, 2003 and the Dog House EP October in 2004.

== Discography ==
=== Live albums ===
- Smor (1995)

=== Other appearances ===
- "Trial Song" (Groovanje devedesete uživo, 2009)

== Videography ==
- Geto (1995)
