= Serbi =

Serbi may refer to:

- Serbs, a South Slavic ethnic group in the Balkans
- Sorbs, a West Slavic ethnic group in the eastern Germany
- Serboi, a historical Sarmatian/Alanian group in the Caucasus
- Šerbi, the vocalist of the Slovene pop group Agropop
- Alternate form of Xianbei, an ancient people that lived in Manchuria and Mongolia.
