= Crno na belo =

Single by Goblini
- A-side: "Luna"
- B-side: "Kao da"
- Released: August 11, 2010
- Recorded: May and June 2010; Road studio, Novi Sad
- Genre: Punk rock, Alternative rock
- Length: 6:20
- Label: Studentski Kulturni Centar Novi Sad; SKCD043
- Songwriter(s): Goblini

Crno na belo (Black and white) is the title of the comeback single by the Serbian punk rock band Goblini, featuring the songs "Luna" ("The Moon"), written during the rehearsals held in May 2010, and "Kao da" ("As if"), written during the U magnovenju recording sessions. The single was released as a collaboration between Studentski kulturni centar Novi Sad and the Šabački Letnji Festival, on which the band performed the first reunion show.

== Track listing ==
Lyrics for all tracks written by Branko Golubović. Track 1 music written by Goblini, track 2 music written by Branko Golubović and Alen Jovanović. Track 2 arranged by Goblini.

Crno na belo
No.	Title	Length
1.	"Luna" (The Moon)	3:27
2.	"Kao da" (As if)	2:53
