= Treća strana medalje =

Studio album by Marčelo
- Released: 17 December 2008
- Genre: Hip hop/Fusion
- Length: 1:07:17
- Label: Multimedia Records

Marčelo chronology
Puzzle Shock! (2005)	Treća strana medalje (2008)	Deca i Sunce (2010)

Treća strana medalje (Third side of medal) is the third studio album by the Serbian hip-hop artist Marčelo. The album contains 15 songs and features various artists from Serbia and Croatia. The album was released by the end of 2008, and contains different music styles, including pop, rock/rock 'n' roll and blues. The album was accepted by the audience like the first two.

== Track listing ==
#	Title	Production	Featured guest(s)	Time
1	"Testament"	Music by: Wikluh Sky; Arrangements by: Wikluh Sky, Marčelo; Scratching by: DJ Raid		5:26
2	"Minut ćutanja"			1:01
3	"Tri želje"	Music by: Wikluh Sky; Arrangements by: Dr Dra and Marčelo; Background vocals by: Marčelo, Nensi, Dr Dra; Double bass & bass by: Aleksandar Andrić	Special guest: Danica Radman	6:16
4	"Ponos"	Music by: Wikluh Sky; Scratching by: DJ Raid; Arrangements by: Wikluh Sky, Marčelo, Dr Dra, Nikola Berček; Vocals: Marčelo, Nensi, Dr Dra; Bass by: Aleksandar Andrić		5:02
5	"Treće oko"	Music by: Smajli; Arrangements by: Smajli, Dr Dra and Marčelo		3:52
6	"Krasnokalipsa"	Music by: D. Ristić; Arrangements by: D. Ristić, Dr Dra and Marčelo; Scratch by: Dj Raid	Featuring: Kal	2:39
7	"Mimohod"	Music by: Dr Dra; Arrangements by: Marčelo, Nafta Dr Dra; Beatbox by: Yula; Vocals by: Marčelo, Dr Dra		5:24
8	"Neko treći"	Music by: Smajli; Arrangements by: Smajli, Dr Dra, Marčelo; Scratching by: DJ Raid; Vocals by: Marčelo, Ministar Lingvista and Dr Dra	Featuring: Ministar Lingvista	3:57
9	"(Kata)strofe bola"	Music by: Wikluh Sky; Arrangements by: Marčelo and Wikluh Sky; Vocals by: Marčelo and Wikluh Sky		4:57
10	"Slova"	Culturaly enlightened: Marčelo and Dr Dra		1:27
11	"Bluz o duhu iz boce"	Music by: Wikluh Sky; Arrangements by: Wikluh Sky, Dr Dra and Marčelo; Guitars by: Peca, I. Pavlović and Wikluh Sky; Bass by: Aleksandar Andrić; Drums by: Nafta		4:48
12	"Tri prsta"	Music by: Dr Dra; Arrangements by: Marčelo and Dr Dra; Vocals by: Marčelo and Jenđe; Bass by: Aleksandar Andrić; Drums by: Marko "Nafta" Milivojević	Featuring: Jenđe	5:52
13	"Mrak"	Arrangements by: Marčelo, Dj Raid and Dr Dra; Music by: DJ Raid and Dash; Bass by: Aleksandar Andrić		5:29
14	"Dole"	Music by: Wikluh Sky; Arrangements by: Marčelo, Wikluh Sky and Dr Dra	Featuring: Doktor Protić	4:44
15	"Svetla gore"	Music by: Dr Dra; Arrangements by: Marčelo and Dr Dra; Scratch by: Dj Raid; Bass by: Aleksandar Andrić; Guitars by: Peca, Dr Dra, N. Berček; Drums by: Nafta; Background vocals by: Marčelo, Ministar Lingvista, Nensi and Smajli	Featuring: Goran Dimitrijević	2:04
16	"Srećna strana medalje"	Music by: Wikluh Sky; Arrangements by: Wikluh Sky, Aleksandar Cupara, Marčelo and Dr Dra; Bass by: Aleksandar Andrić	Featuring: Wikluh Sky	4:10

== Other ==
- The limited edition of the album contained a bonus disc, called "Bonus strana medalje". It featured the members of the Filter Crew, as well as several other artists, like Iskaz. On the bonus disc, there are remixes of three songs from the previous albums: Pozerište, Bol i revolt, Kuća na promaji.
