= Deca i Sunce =

Studio album by Marčelo
- Released: 24 December 2010
- Genre: Hip hop
- Length: 50:28
- Label: Multimedia Records

Marčelo chronology
Treća strana medalje (2008)	Deca i Sunce (2010)	Napet Šou (2014)

Deca i Sunce (Children and the Sun) is the fourth studio album by the Serbian hip-hop artist Marčelo. This is the first album released under moniker "Marčelo & Filteri". The album contains 14 songs.

== Track listing ==
No.	Title	Length
1.	"Filter: Iz ranijih epizoda"	1:53
2.	"Teska artiljerija"	3:14
3.	"Kita"	3:56
4.	"Sindrom Pepeljuge"	3:22
5.	"Blagosloveni sjeb"	3:46
6.	"Mamica"	4:19
7.	"Mozda bas ti"	3:02
8.	"Pismo vanzemaljcu (Dara I)"	3:34
9.	"Bube"	4:10
10.	"Ispod (Dara II)"	3:40
11.	"Odraslima" (feat. Suid)	3:35
12.	"Kostim"	3:57
13.	"Takav da mirno spava"	3:39
14.	"Sunce"	4:21
Total length:		50:28

== Other ==
- Luxury Edition of the album is released on July 6, 2011. It comes with three additional tracks on main disc ("Mastilo", "Saveti", and "Glupi genije") and bonus DVD called "Živa strana medalje", recording of concert in Belgrade Youth Center.
