= Plug'n'play =

Serbian band

Plug'n'Play
- Origin: Novi Sad, Serbia
- Genres: Alternative rock, Post-grunge, Hard rock
- Years active: 2002 – present
- Label: SKCNS
- Members: Srđan Slankamenac; Goran Beg; Zoran Mandić; Robert Moldvaji; Nenad Karišić
- Past members: Vasil Tomov; Predrag Novković; Miloš Sremački

Plug’n’Play is a Serbian alternative rock band.

== History ==
Plug’n’ Play band was formed in Novi Sad, in November, 2002. Initial band members were guitarist/vocalist Goran Beg, bassist Zoran Mandić and drummer Predrag Novković (ex Porshe Lynn). Two months after the band had been formed, Vasil Tomov-Flipp was recruited as the band’s leading vocalist and Goran, while retaining the responsibility of the guitarist, accepted the new role of the supporting vocalist. As the band members were becoming more acquainted with each other, they also became more musically attuned by playing mainly interpretations of popular rock songs. Plug’n’ Play had its debut in front of a live audience in Novi Sad Night Club Enter, in April 2003. The live performance, included interpretations of the bands such as Pearl Jam, The Cult, Neurotic Outsiders, Let 3 and Supergrass.

This live performance marked the end of the first phase of the band’s development. Consequently, the band decided to create its own music, which in essence was inextricably influenced by the worldly renowned aforementioned bands, including also Rage Against The Machine, Audioslave, Tool, Faith No More and many others.

In autumn 2003, due to differences in musical preconceptions between the band’s leading vocalist and the rest of the band members, Flipp decided to leave, which in turn slightly delayed musical productivity of the band. Nonetheless, the band continued working without a leading vocalist until February 2004, when Srdjan Slankamenac-Slani (ex-Post Scriptum) joined the band as a new leading vocalist.

After a period of rehearsals with the new vocalist, Plug’n’Play commenced with its live performances mostly in Novi Sad Night Clubs. The band with its new vocalist Slani, had its first concert as a part of manifestation named "Saberimo se Novosadjani", in NS Time club, on 3 October 2004, after which the band had a series of live performances in all prominent nightclubs of Novi Sad.

== 2005-2006 ==
In February 2005, Plug’n’Play recorded their first demo cd – ‘Plug-ins’ with three songs: ‘Plug’n’Play’, ‘Friend’ and ‘Angel’ (Massive Attack cover). The demo songs were recorded at ‘Zid’ studio in S. Kamenica and at ‘Digital tone works’ studio in Rumenka by the producer Dragan Alimpijevic – Pik.

In September 2005, the bend recorded a music video for the song Plug ’n’ Play. During late 2005 and early in 2006, this music clip was played on numerous local and national TV stations, as well as on the MTV Adria.

In the meantime, Plug’n’Play band appeared several times as the special guest in the concerts of popular rock bends. Some of these concerts include Del Arno Band in Trema Club, dedicated to disadvantaged children (Decije selo, Sremska Kamenica), on 22 November 2005. Also, Plug’n’Play performed live as the special guest of Block Out bend, in Gradiliste Club on 1 April 2006. Further, Plug ’n’ Play participated at the reinstated musical festival "String" in Subotica, on 18 August 2006. At the end of September 2006, Plug’n’Play played on a tour named "Days of Vojvidina in Istra" in Pula, Pazin and Buzet (Croatia), along with bands such as Zbogom Brus Lee and UMT.

== Raise your voice 2007-2009 ==
Plug’n’Play recorded its first album in 2007. The album is titled "Raise your voice" and it consists of 12 songs. The producer is yet again Dragan Alampijevic-Pik. Album release was followed by a promotion in Trema club in Novi Sad on 2 November 2007. The band recorded a video for the song "Was it better when it was worse" and got back to live performances. In 2008. Plug'n'Play started working on the material for the new album and recorded the first 5 demo tracks.

== 2009-present ==
In the early 2009. Predrag Novković left the band, and the remaining band members continued to work on a new album. In November 2009. Miloš Sremački steps in as a drummer. Two months after that the band records a new single 'The One', but shortly after that Sremački diverged. Nevertheless, the band continued working on the new album, and in June 2010 Robert Moldvaji (Grate) comes in as a permanent drummer.

== Discography ==
=== Studio albums ===
- Plug-INS (2005)
- Raise Your Voice (2007)
