= Najbolje priče =

Live album by Goblini
- Released: 2004
- Genre: Punk rock
- Length: 68:11
- Label: Multimedia Records; CD 1009
- Producer: Goblini, Aleksandar Radosavljević

Goblini live chronology
| Re Contra (1999) | Najbolje priče (2004) |

Najbolje priče is the third live album by the Serbian punk rock band Goblini released in 2004 by Multimedia Records. The album, featuring live recordings made at the band's peak, also features a bonus studio track "Pričaš", recorded in 1997. On the CD also appeared two music videos, for "Pričaš" and "Voz". Beside Serbia, the album was distributed in Slovenia and Croatia.

== Track listing ==
| No. | Title | Length |
|---|---|---|
| 1. | "Pričaš" (You are speaking; bonus studio track) | 2:50 |
| 2. | "Daleki put" (A faraway trip) | 4:30 |
| 3. | "U magnovenju" (In the flash) | 3:18 |
| 4. | "Petra" (Peter) | 2:09 |
| 5. | "Znam" (I know) | 2:42 |
| 6. | "On je, ona je" (It's him, it's her) | 2:48 |
| 7. | "Privatni rat" (Private war) | 2:58 |
| 8. | "Ima nas" (There's a lot of us) | 4:00 |
| 9. | "Bella ciao" (Goodbye beautiful) | 2:22 |
| 10. | "Ciponjka" | 2:26 |
| 11. | "Punk's not dead" | 2:17 |
| 12. | "Ona" (She) | 2:48 |
| 13. | "Sam-phone-glas" (Alone-phone-voice) | 4:52 |
| 14. | "Dan posle" (The day after) | 2:34 |
| 15. | "Tamara" (Boris Novković cover) | 2:15 |
| 16. | "Ne trebam nikome" (Nobody needs me) | 4:29 |
| 17. | "Vođa" (The leader) | 2:44 |
| 18. | "Voz" (The train) | 3:38 |
| 19. | "Bolje soko u ruci nego guska u krevetu" (Better a falcon in hand than a goose in bed) | 2:12 |
| 20. | "ELeSDi se vraca kuci" (LSD is returning home) | 2:25 |
| 21. | "Za Lorenu" (For Lorena) | 3:20 |
| 22. | "Anja volim te / Kraj" (Anja, I love you / The end) | 4:34 |

== Personnel ==
- Vlada Kokotović — bass
- Zoran Jević "Fric" — drums
- Alen Jovanović — guitar
- Branko Golubović "Golub" — vocals
- Saša Šetka — guitar
- Leo Fon Punkerstain — guitar
- Milan Arnautović "Firca" — drums
