= Napet Šou =

Studio album by Marčelo
- Released: 1 October 2014
- Recorded: 2013–2014 in studio "Digimedia"
- Genre: Hip hop
- Label: Laguna (book), Lampshade Media (album)
- Producer: Janko Maraš, Milan Marković, Rade Sklopić (co-producer), Marko Šelić (co-producer)

Marčelo chronology
Deca i Sunce (2008)	Napet Šou (2014)

Napet Šou (Tense Show) is name of the book accompanied by homonymous fifth album by Serbian writer and hip-hop artist Marčelo. The album contains 19 tracks and it was made by a crew that counts over 50 people. Book-album was released on October 1, 2014 and it broke all records of publishing houses Laguna and Delfi SKC along with Marčelo's personal record in book and album signing.

== Track listing ==
No.	Title	Length
1.	"Šankeru _{(eng. Waiter)}"	4:51
2.	"Muk _{(eng. Hush)}"	4:01
3.	"Laž _{(eng. Lie)}"	4:51
4.	"20 000"	5:34
5.	"Himna Maršala Mita"	4:03
6.	"(breaking news)"	0:54
7.	"Šurda"	4:47
8.	"Tunel _{(eng. Tunnel)}"	2:59
9.	"Totalno _{(eng. Totally)}"	3:28
10.	"(mamurluk) _{(eng. Hangover)}"	1:09
11.	"Komplikovani _{(eng. Complicated)}"	3:35
12.	"Baba! _{(eng. Old lady)}"	4:21
13.	"Opajdarsko kolo"	2:27
14.	"Čep _{(eng. Cork)}"	4:20
15.	"Pegla _{(eng. Iron)}"	2:45
16.	"Stomak _{(eng. Stomach)}"	4:30
17.	"Šapat _{(eng. Whisper)}"	4:22
18.	"Danas neću napisati ništa _{(eng. I won't write anything today)}"	4:24
19.	"Kavez _{(eng. Cage)}"	5:22
