= Sick Mother Fakers =

- Also known as: SMF
- Origin: Belgrade, Serbia
- Genres: Hardcore punk, crossover thrash, metalcore
- Years active: 1989–present
- Labels: ITMM, PGP-RTS
- Website: www.smfband.com

Sick Mother Fakers (Fakers being transliteration for Fuckers), also known as SMF for short, is a Serbian hardcore punk/crossover thrash band from Belgrade.

== History ==
=== 1980s ===
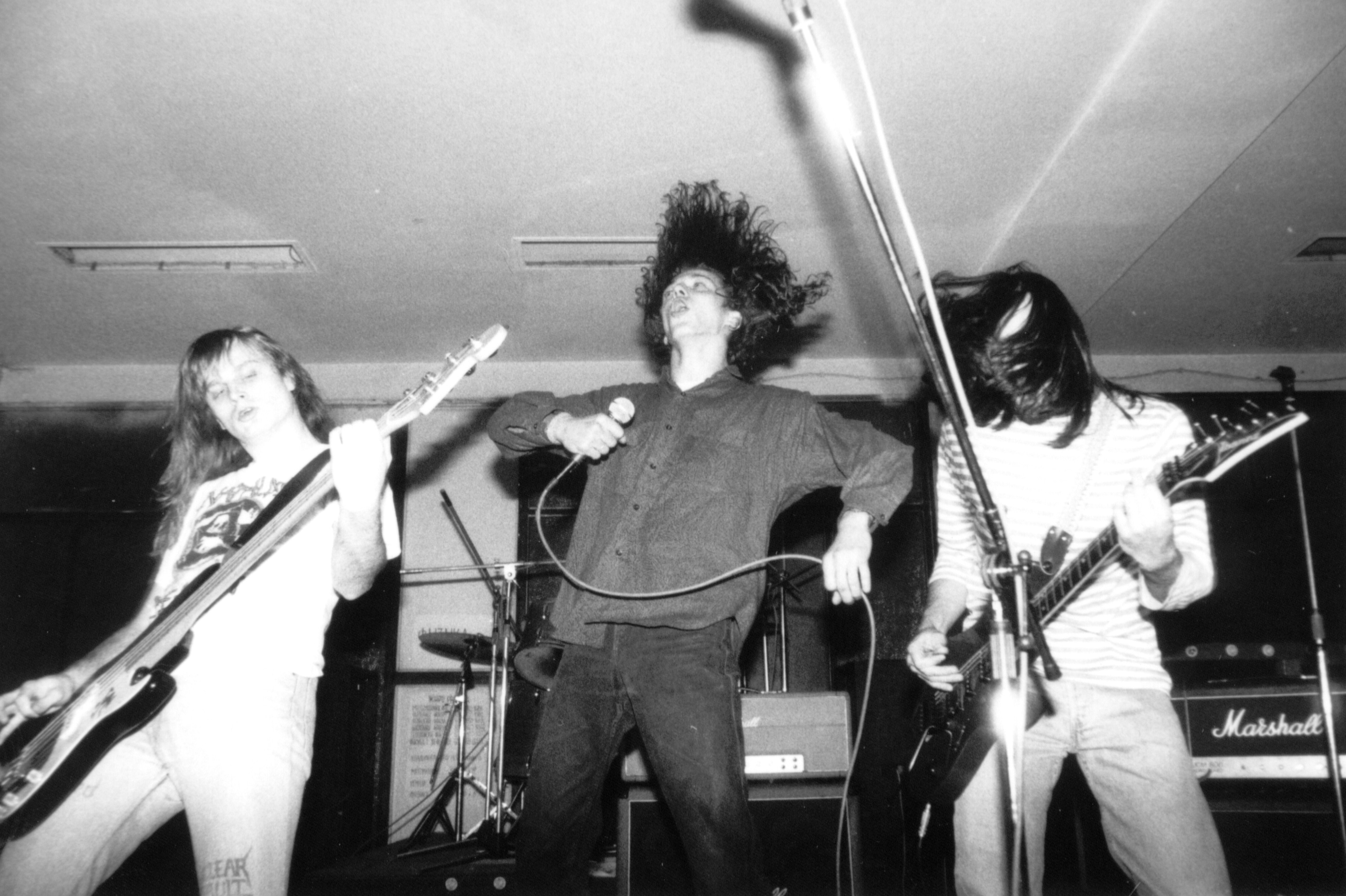
Sick Mother Fakers performing live in 1989

The band was formed in 1989 as a side project of musicians, who beside playing with their own bands, wanted to create a one-off band which would perform at a festival held at Belgrade's SKC. Influenced by Stormtroopers of Death, Charged GBH and Suicidal Tendencies, they wanted to create a hardcore band with simple, humorous and sarcastic lyrics written by themselves. The first lineup consisted of former Brainstorm and Overdose guitarist Zoran "Đura "Đuroski, former Karizma and Amnesia bass guitarist Dejan "Francuz" Lukić who played the drums, former Genocid, Heller and Brainstorm guitarist Dare who played bass guitar, and Amnesia and Kerozin guitarist Kokan who did the vocals.

The set list, performed at the festival, consisted of eight songs written in one day. Due to the positive audience reaction, the band continued working but without Đuroski and Kokan who left the band after the first gig and were replaced by Sale on vocals and Brainstorm drummer Šola. Lukić and Dare returned to their original instruments. This lineup of Sick Mother Fakers worked until 1994.

After a few live appearances, the band recorded a demo consisting of nine songs, which ought to have been released as an EP by the Start Today Records, but it never happened. Even though never released, this demo made the band popular and got the audience interested in the band's work. The band performed until 1991 when the war broke out.

=== 1990s ===
Sick Mother Fakers in 1998

Due to the political situation in the country, the band did not perform live, but they wrote material for their debut album. Dalje nećeŠ moći... plati pa ćeš proći! (You Are not Going further... Pay and You'll Come Through) featured the rerecorded versions of the songs which appeared on the demo and fifteen new songs. The album was recorded in early August 1994 in the Focus Studio for about thirty hours and was released by ITV Melomarket in 1995. The band demonstrated inspiration by Slobodan Šijan's movies Who's That Singing Over There and The Marathon Family in the songs "Dalje nećes moći...", "Daj pare" ("Give the Money"), "Đenka", "Opljačkani smo" ("We Have Been Robbed") and "Vozi, Miško" ("Drive, Miško"), featuring the Who's That Singing Over There theme. The political and social situation in the country was described in the songs "Vreme krize" ("Chrisis Times"), "Bus", "'Oću moju platu" ("I Want My Salary"), and others. The album also featured a hardcore punk/turbo-folk cover of the Suicidal Tendencies song "I Saw Your Mommy". A promotional video was recorded for the track "Cvikam žicu" ("I'm Cutting the Wire").

In 1995, the movie director Dejan Zečević, and a friend of the band members, used the band's songs in his movie Dečak iz Junkovca. In the meantime, Šola left the band and joined Đuroski's doom metal band Svarog. His replacement was the former Brainstorm drummer Boris. Since his arrival, the lineup has not changed.

The following year the band started writing new material. Lako ćemo (It'll Be Easy) was released in 1998 and featured seventeen songs including the cover of the Riblja Čorba hit "Odlazak u grad" ("Going to the City"). "Doktore, pomagaj" ("Doctor, Help"), "Propade mi pos'o" ("My Business Is Ruined"), "Šoferska tuga" ("Driver's Sorrow") i "Majstori" ("Artizans") represented the image of the social situation in Serbia, but through a grotesque note. The album was also a multimedia CD, as it contained a short video. After the album release and the live presentation of the album, Sale joined the punk rock band Šaht as a new drummer.

=== 2000s ===
In 2000, the band started preparing their new album, but stopped performing live. The album recording was finished in 2006. The band went further with their music and beside the influences of crossover, metal, punk rock and funk, used elements of industrial music, break beat, drum & bass, techno and trance.

During the same year the band started performing live again and played as an opening act for Soulfly at SKC in Belgrade. The band continued the concert activity and in November 2007, PGP-RTS released the third album Ma kome majku? (Whose Mother?). A promotional video was recorded for the track "'Ajde" ("C'mon"). The album featured a cover of the song "You Spin Me Round" by Dead or Alive. After the album release, the band went on a tour, visiting major Serbian and former Yugoslav cities.

== Discography ==
- Dalje nećes moći... plati pa ćeš proći! (1995)
- Lako ćemo (1998)
- Ma kome majku? (2007)
- Boli glava (2016)
