= Turneja u magnovenju 96/97 =

Turneja u magnovenju 97/98

Live album by Goblini
- Released: 1998
- Recorded: 1996–1997
- Genre: Punk rock
- Length: 66:13
- Label: Metropolis Records; MCD 012
- Producer: Goblini, Aleksandar Radosavljević

Goblini live chronology
U magnovenju (1996)	Turneja u magnovenju 97/98 (1998)	Re Contra (1999)

Turneja u magnovenju 97/98 is the second live album by the Serbian punk rock band Goblini released in 1998 by Metropolis Records. The album was released as a double CD release featuring the reissue of Istinite priče I deo.

== Track listing ==
No.	Title	Length
1.	"On" (Him; recorded live in Kragujevac on August 3, 1996)	2:57
2.	"Ima nas" (There's a lot of us; recorded live in Skopje on September 21, 1996)	3:53
3.	"Godine raspleta" (The denouement years; recorded live in Niš on January 30, 1997)	2:27
4.	"Vođa" (The leader; recorded live in Niš on January 30, 1997)	2:53
5.	"On je, ona je" (It's him, it's her; recorded live in Pogonik pri Litiji on June 28, 1997)	3:31
6.	"U magnovenju" (In the flash; recorded live in Ruski Krstur on April 12, 1997)	3:32
7.	"No Fun" (The Stooges cover; recorded live in Vranje on February 01, 1997)	2:58
8.	"Sam-phone-glas" (Alone-phone-voice; recorded at the 100th concert in Šabac Hard Rock Cafe on January 24, 1997)	4:48
9.	"Petra" (Peter; recorded live in Belgrade on March 28, 1997)	2:27
10.	"Kraj" (The end; recorded live in Belgrade on March 28, 1997)	2:41
11.	"Minijatura" (Miniature, KUD Idijoti cover; recorded live in Belgrade on March 28, 1997)	3:21
12.	"Ona" (She; recorded live in Ljubljana on May 29, 1997)	3:08
13.	"Pet Sematary" (The Ramones cover; recorded live in Belgrade on March 28, 1997)	3:02
14.	"P-5" (recorded live in Ilirska Bistrica on October 4, 1996)	2:18
15.	"Privatni rat" (Private war; recorded live in Ilirska Bistrica on October 4, 1996)	3:24
16.	"Anja, volim te" (Anja, I love you; recorded live in Belgrade on March 28, 1997)	2:48
17.	"Neon Forest" (Iggy Pop cover; recorded live in Belgrade on March 28, 1997)	4:37
18.	"Bolje soko u ruci nego guska u krevetu" (Beter a falcon in hand than a goose in bed; recorded live in Belgrade on March 28, 1997)	2:29
19.	"In Memoriam" (recorded live in Koper on June 8, 1997)	2:32
20.	"Za Lorenu" (For Lorena; recorded live in Sombor on March 1, 1997)	4:01
21.	"Punk's Not Dead" (Studio track recorded at the Belgrade Akademija studio on July 23, & 24, 1997)	2:26

== Personnel ==
- Vlada Kokotović — bass
- Zoran Jević "Fric" — drums
- Alen Jovanović — guitar
- Branko Golubović "Golub" — vocals
- Saša Šetka — guitar
- Leo Fon Punkerstain — guitar (1996 dates)
- D. Vartabedijan — artwork by [design]
- Leo Fon Punkerstein — artwork by [design]
- N. Stanković — artwork by [Design], photography
