= De Facto (Marčelo album) =

Studio album by Marčelo
- Released: November 2003
- Genre: Hip hop
- Length: 73:21
- Label: Bassivity Music
- Producer: Oneya

Marčelo chronology
De Facto (2003)	Puzzle Shock! (2005)

De Facto is the debut album by Marčelo released in 2003. It was one of the best selling albums in 2003. The most critics were risen around song "Kuća na promaji" which in short defines Marčelo's style: very personal colorful criticism over political situation in Serbia.

== Track listing ==
No.	Title	Length
1.	"Reč na reč"	3:18
2.	"Kuća na promaji"	3:41
3.	"Krem De La Krem" (feat. Disciplinska komisija (Edo Maajka & Frenkie))	2:56
4.	"4" (feat. Shorty)	4:09
5.	"Pismo bratu" (feat. Nensi)	4:31
6.	"Bekstvo" (feat. Elemental)	5:21
7.	"Kafanska spika"	3:05
8.	"3 (Lutanje, maštanje & sanjanje)" (feat. X3m)	3:12
9.	"Povratak Hiphopa" (feat. Trial)	4:38
10.	"Suze" (feat. Edo Maajka & Nensi)	4:11
11.	"Kloš vs. Ljax"	4:18
12.	"MC bez harizme" (feat. Urban)	4:18
13.	"2 (Bol & Revolt)" (feat. Dexstarr)	4:41
14.	"Podzemlje"	3:08
15.	"Bolji život" (feat. Gru)	3:58
16.	"1"	3:37
17.	"I opet kafanska spika" (feat. Trip-R, Ikac, El Prezidente & Bookey MC)	4:09
18.	"...De Facto..."	6:10
Total length:		1:13:21
