= Petar Pan =

- Petar Pan in the early 1990s

Background information
- Origin: Belgrade, Serbia
- Genres: Garage rock; power pop; punk rock
- Years active: 1986–1996; 2015–present
- Labels: Rockland, ITMM, Ammonite Records
- Members: Dejan Milošević; Marko Marović; Nedeljko Stojković; Nikola Vukotić
- Past members: Veroljub Spasić; Vangeli Dundas; Predrag Ivanišević; Dražen Kovačević

Petar Pan (Serbian Cyrillic: Петар Пан) is a Serbian and Yugoslav rock band formed in Belgrade in 1986 named after Peter Pan. The band was a prominent act of the late 1980s and early 1990s Yugoslav rock scene.

== History ==
=== 1986 – 1996 ===
The band was formed in 1986, and spent the first year of activity preparing material for their debut album. After several lineup changes, the default lineup was formed, featuring Dejan Milošević (guitar, vocals), Veroljub Spasić (drums), Vangeli Dundas (guitar) and a former Mrgudi member Predrag Ivanišević (bass guitar). In 1989, the band won the first place at the Belgrade Spring festival demo bands competition. The award was a contract with PGP-RTB, however, the band never got an opportunity to record an album for the label.

During the same year, the band released their debut album Od mržnje do ljubavi (From Hatred to Love) for the independent record label Rockland. Most of the album material was written by Milošević. Their following album, entitled 1, was released in 1991 through Rockland. The album featured melodic rock sound, and brought minor hits "Ptica" ("The Bird") and "Bože pravde" ("Lord, Give Us Justice", entitled after former anthem of Serbia), the latter composed by former Tvrdo Srce i Velike Uši and Ulica Od Meseca member Dragutin Savić.

In 1993, Milošević left the band, and was replaced by former member of the Zagreb band Dum Dum Boys Dražen Kovačević. With him, the band recorded the album Bio jednom jedan r 'n' r (There Once Was a Rock 'n' Roll), released in 1996 through ITMM. The album was produced by Dragoljub Spasić, and featured Dža ili Bu frontman Nebojša Simeunović "Sabljar" as guest. After the album was released, the band ended their activity.

=== Post breakup ===
After Petar Pan disbanded, Spasić moved to the band Eklinika Mortale, recording the album Mleveno meso (Minced Meat, 1996) with them. After that, he moved to the band Qrve, recording their self-titled debut (2000) with them, and after he left Qrve, he joined Del Arno Band, with which he recorded the album Vreme vode (The Time of Water, 2005).

=== 2015 reunion ===
In 2015, Petar Pan reunited in the lineup featuring Milošević (guitar, vocals), Marko Marović (guitar, vocals), Nedeljko Stojković (bass guitar, vocals) and Nikola Vukotić (drums, vocals). The band released their comeback single "Alkohol" ("Alcohol") in October 2015. In November 2016, the band released the single "Želim da ti kažem" ("I Want To Tell You").

In February 2018, the band released their comeback album, Bežim odavde (I'm Getting Outta Here). The album, announced by the single "Strah" ("Fear"), released in September 2017, was released through Ammonite Records.

== Discography ==
=== Studio albums ===
- Od mržnje do ljubavi (1989)
- 1 (1991)
- Bio jednom jedan r 'n' r (1996)
- Bežim odavde (2018)
