= Milan Petrovic Quartet =

Serbian jazz band

- Also known as: MPQ, Milan Petrović Kvartet
- Origin: Belgrade, Serbia
- Genres: Jazz, Blues, Funk
- Years active: 2011–present
- Label: SKCNS/Metropolis Records
- Members: Milan Petrović; Dimitrije Mojsijevic; Lehel Nagy; Robert Gostinčar
- Past members: Bogdan Zdjelar, Siniša Hadži Antić
- Website: www.milanpetrovic.com; mpquartet.bandcamp.com

Milan Petrovic Quartet was formed in April 2011, and its first concert was in Belgrade, in hall Parobrod, 12.05.2011. Its second album Favorites was released in September 2013. Today, MPQ plays instrumental music with funk, blues, swing, jazz elements. MP Quartet is one of the most active bands in Serbian jazz/blues scene.

== Members ==
- Milan Petrović – keyboards
- Dimitrije Mojsijević – drums
- Lehel Nagy – saxophone
- Robert Gostinčar – bass guitar, double bass

== Discography ==
=== Albums ===
==== Happiness ====
Album released 2024. Metropolis Music.

1. What you have (ft Milan Nikolic)
2. That is what you think is happiness
3. Step to achieve happiness
4. Big mess after reaching happiness
5. New happiness with sadness for the past (ft Branko Markovic)
6. The end of the new happiness (ft Ricardo Martinez & Nenad Vasilic)
7. Coming back after living in a dream
8. New reality
9. Starting from zero (ft Vladimir Samardžic)
10. Happy again

==== Emotions ====
Album released 2018. Metropolis Music.

1. Aero
2. Blue as the sky & sea
3. Friday the 13th
4. Bubbles
5. Robbo walk
6. Another way
7. Deja vu
8. Rain chant
9. Kontraverzny businessman
10. Stuck in the elevator

==== Dates ====
Album released 2016. Metropolis Music.

1. 14.01.2012.
2. 17.01.2014.
3. 27.12.2012.
4. 19.01.2012.
5. 10.06.2011.
6. 19.09.2013.
7. 12.01.2014.
8. 30.05.2012.
9. 22.07.2014.
10. 20.05.2013.

==== Live @ Nišville Jazz festival 2014. ====
Album released 2015.

==== High Voltage Studio Sessions Vol.2 Milan Petrović Quartet Live ====
Album released 2014.

==== Favorites ====
Album released 2013.

==== Excursion ====
Album released 2012. SKCNS

1. Amsterdam Central Station (ft Dušan Bezuha)
2. Orient express(ft Wikluh Sky & Blue Family)
3. Jam in Rome (ft Pace, Darko & Duda)
4. Autumn in London (ft Vasil Hadžimanov & Aca Seltic)
5. Cool swing from Pancevo (ft Ivan Aleksijević & Blue Family)
6. Belgrade funky time (studio session) (ft Paja)
7. Travelling by Mississippi (ft Zafa)
8. Santorini view (ft Dušan Bezuha & Boris Bunjac)
9. Nuits sous le Toir Eifell (ft Ana Stanić & Dušan Bezuha)
10. Memphis blue nights (ft Raw Hide)
11. Afroman in New York (ft Alberto So Sabi & Dušan Bezuha)
12. Talking about blues & Cuba (ft Vladimir Maričić)
