= Milan Petrović (musician) =

- Born: Milan Petrović; 23 September 1976 (age 49); Belgrade, SFR Yugoslavia
- Origin: Belgrade, Serbia
- Genres: Jazz, blues, blues rock, jazz-funk, funk, reggae, pop, pop rock,
- Occupations: keyboard player, songwriter, composer, film producer
- Years active: 1993–present
- Label: SKCNS,
- Website: Official Site

Milan Petrović (Serbian Cyrillic: Милан Петровић, born 23 September 1976, in Belgrade, SFR Yugoslavia) is a Serbian keyboard player, songwriter and composer.

== Discography ==
=== Solo / Milan Petrovic Quartet ===
- The Best of 2011-2021
  - Year:2021
- Emotions
  - Year:2018
- Orient
  - Year:2017
- Lady's touch
  - Year:2017
- Dates
  - Year:2016
- Live @ Nišville Jazz festival 2014
  - Year:2015
- High Voltage Studio Sessions Vol.2 Milan Petrović Quartet Live
  - Year:2014
- Favorites
  - Year: 2013
- Excursion
  - Year: 2012
  - Label: SKCNS

=== with Del Arno Band ===
- Retrospective
  - Year: 2001
  - Label: Automatik Records
- Vreme Vode
  - Year: 2005
  - Label: Automatic Records

=== Guest appearances ===
- Strah od petenja, Sabanoti (1995)
- Dog Life, Eyesburn (1998)
- Prekidi Stvarnosti, Kanda, Kodža i Nebojša (2005)
- Feeling Groovy, Blue Family (2009)
- Homebound, Ventolin (2011)
- Saw Friendly, Sonja Kalajić (2016)
- Aftershock, Mario Rasic & Nebojša Buhin (2018)
- Aja Sofija, Branko Isakovic (2018)
- Otrovan, Elektromattik (2019)
