= Del Arno Band =

Serbian and Yugoslav reggae band

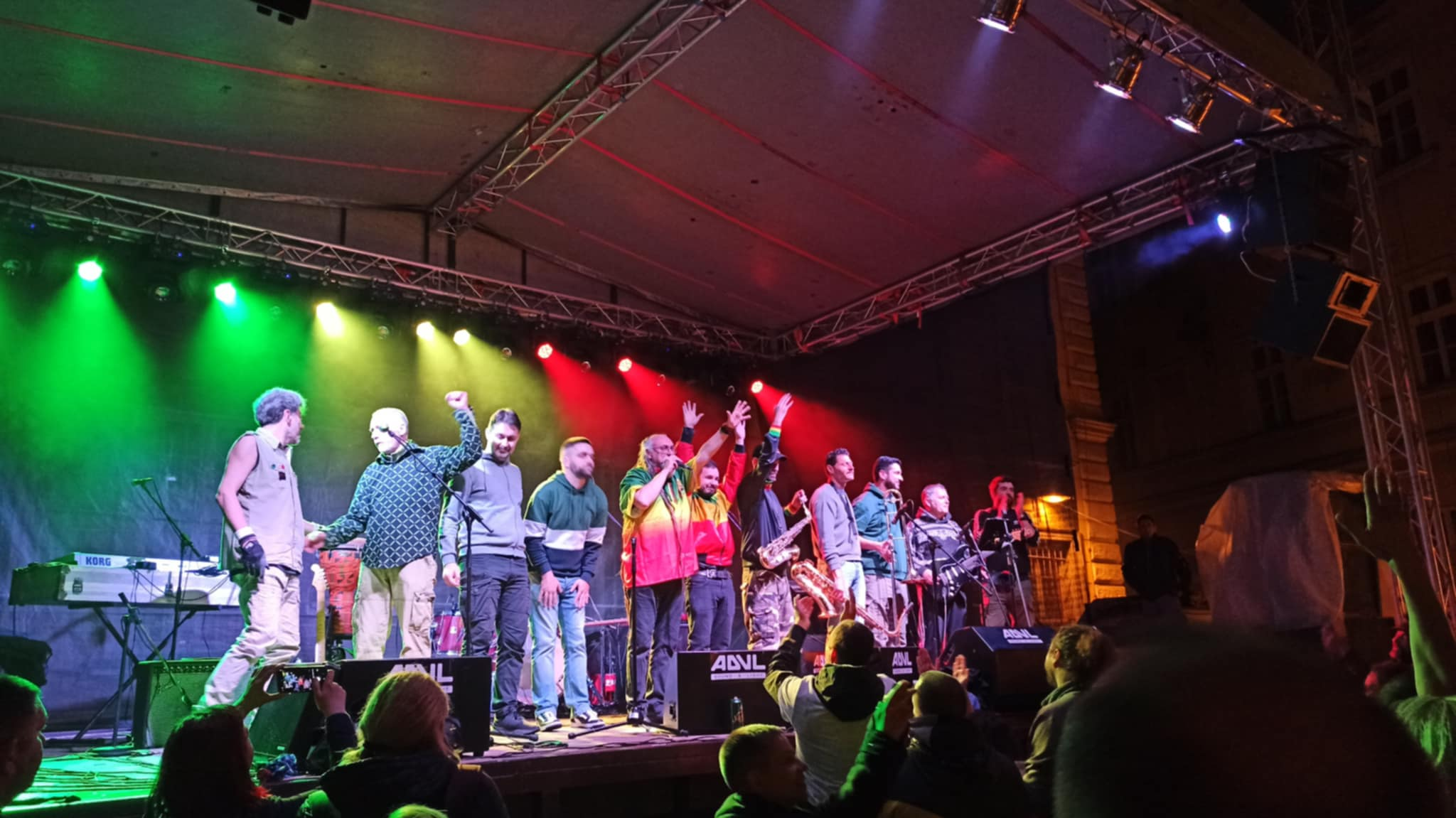
- Del Arno Band in 2025

Background information
- Origin: Belgrade, Serbia
- Genres: Reggae; pop rock; world music; jazz
- Years active: 1986–present
- Labels: SKC Beograd, Rockland, Ram Records, Take It Or Leave It Records, Eastfield Music, Automatik Records, Mascom
- Members: Jovan Matić; Đorđe Ćurčić; Aleksandar Petković; Dobroslav Predić; Veroljub Spasić; Milan Petrović; Mihajlo Bogosavljević; Tatjana Popović; Tatjana Šuletić
- Past members: List: Vladan Matić Aleksandar Radosavljević Miodrag Vidić Dragan Vidojević Vladimir Lešić Bruno Garotić Vladimir Vranić Slobodan Grozdanović Dejan Utvar Darko Golić Milan Petrić Nemanja Kojić Zoja Borovčanin Jasmina Abu El Rub Marin Petrić Marko Cvetković Borivoje Borac Brana Kosić Dalibor Vučić Dušica Živanović Ilija Miljević Jasna Nikolić Maja Gojković Maja Pajević Mirjana Pilipović Nenad Potije Predrag Kovačević Tanja Venčelovski Vedran Nenadović Đorđe Vasović

Del Arno Band, sometimes abbreviated to DAB, is a Serbian and Yugoslav reggae band formed in Belgrade in 1986. Del Arno Band are one of the pioneers of Serbian and Yugoslav reggae scenes and are considered the longest-lasting reggae band from the former Yugoslav region.

The group was formed by brothers Jovan (vocals, percussion) and Vladan Matić (vocal, guitar, keyboards). Although prior to the band formation reggae songs and influences had been present on the Yugoslav rock scene, Del Arno Band are considered the first Yugoslav roots reggae band and the first Yugoslav reggae band to perform their own songs. The band gained prominence in the late 1980s, enjoying considerable mainstream popularity in Serbia during the following decades. During four decades of Del Arno Band's career, more than 150 members passed through the band, including a number of prominent musicians. Up to date, the band has released four studio albums, a live album and several compilations.

== History ==
=== 1980s ===
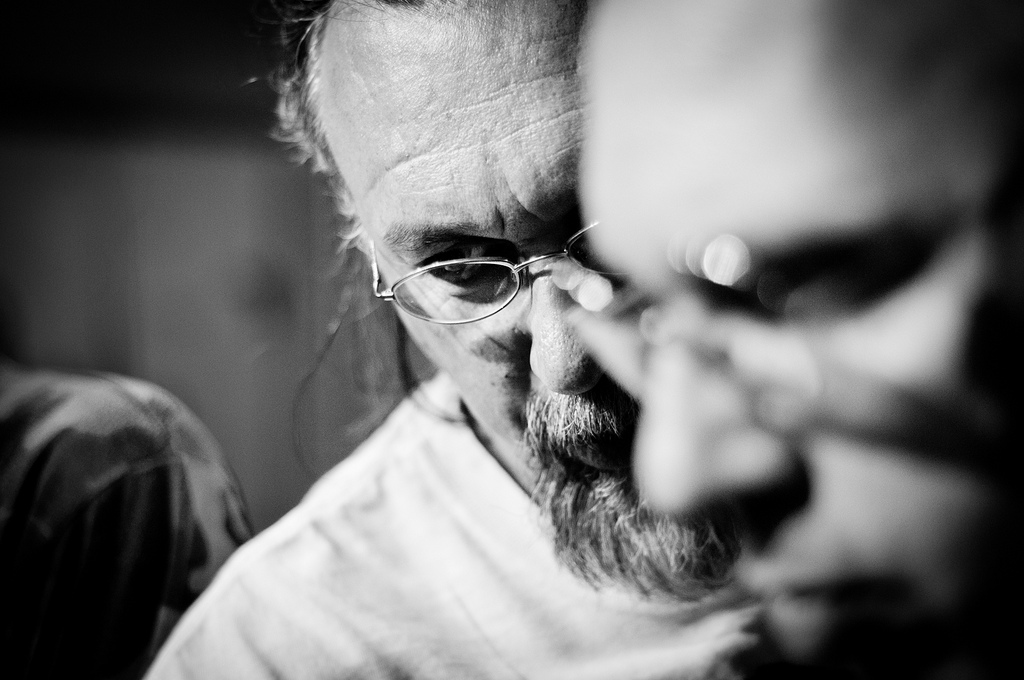
The founding members of Del Arno Band, brothers Jovan (left) and Vladan Matić (right)

Brothers Jovan (vocals) and Vladan Matić (guitar, vocals), fans of reggae music, formed a ten-piece band in 1986, naming it Del Arno Band. Although influences of reggae music had been present in the works of acts from the Yugoslav rock scene, especially in the works by Yugoslav new wave bands, Del Arno Band was the first Yugoslav roots reggae band and the first Yugoslav reggae band to perform their own songs, with all the songs authored by the Matić brothers.

After a series of successful club performances, the band participated in the 1988 Festival Omladina, entering the finals, and eventually appearing on the festival's The Best of 237 various artists compilation with the song "Ne radim" ("I'm Not Working"), which was their dicographyc debut. The song was recorded in the lineup which, beside the Matić brothers, also featured Aleksandar Radosavljević (guitar), Miodrag Vidić (bass guitar), Dragan Vidojević (drums), Vladimir Lešić (percussion), Bruno Garotić (saxophone), Vladimir Vranić (trumpet) and Slobodan Grozdanović (trombone).

=== 1990s ===
In early 1990, the band released their debut album, Igraj dok te ne sruše (Dance Until They Tear You Down), originally released on compact cassette only. Beside their own songs, the album also featured a cover version of the Burning Spear song "Happy Day" with lyrics in Serbian language and entitled "Ljudi dobre volje" ("People of Good Will"). The album was produced by the band themselves with the help of Bajaga i Instruktori bass guitarist Miroslav Cvetković. The following year, the band released a 7-inch single featuring the songs "Bi-Bap" ("Be-Bop") and "Putujem" ("I Am Travelling").

The recording of the band's concert held at Belgrade's Students' Cultural Center on 21 February 1992 was released during the same year on the live album Godina majmuna (The Year of the Monkey). The album also included several previously unreleased songs. Live versions of the band's songs from the album featured numerous musical quotations from reggae songs and a cover version of the popular 1960s Yugoslav schlager "Čamac na Tisi" ("A Boat on the Tisa") composed by Darko Kraljić. Following the album release, musical differences caused the lineup to split up, but the Matić brothers managed to ensure a continuity in the band's work by releasing the 1993 compilation album Geneza (Genesis), featuring two newly-recorded songs, "Iza ugla" ("Behind the Corner") and "DAB in dub", and by performing at the January 1994 unplugged festival held in Belgrade's Sava Centar, the recording of their song "Ima mesta za sve" ("There is a Place for Everyone") appearing on the live various artists album Bez struje (Unplugged).

After longer hiatus, the Matić brothers reformed Del Arno Band in a new lineup: Jovan Matić (vocals, percussion), Vladan Matić (vocals, guitar, keyboards), Dejan Utvar (drums), Darko Golić (bass guitar), Milan Petrić "Puroni" (percussion), Đorde Ćurčić (guitar), Aleksandar Petković (saxophone), Nemanja Kojić (trombone), Dobroslav Predić (trumpet), Zoja Borovčanin (backing vocals, violin) and Jasmina Abu El Rub (backing vocals, flute). The new lineup released the band' comeback album Reggaeneracija (Reggaeneration) in late 1995. As guests on the album appeared Ekatarina Velika keyboardist Margita Stefanović, the Andean music band Pachamama, the Paganke trio and Sunshine vocalist Bane Bojović. On the album the band introduced diverse musical influences into their material. The album brought radio hits "Dim iz moje lule" ("Smoke from My Pipe"), "DAB je tu da spaja" ("DAB Is Here to Connect") and "Više nego život" ("More Than Life"). The album also featured a cover version of Haustor song "Treći svijet" ("The Third World"), expanded with traditional music influences.

The following year, the band performed at the reprise of the Sunsplash festival in Slovenia, headlined by Misty in Roots. In late 1996, the band appeared on Kornelije Kovač's solo album Moja generacija (My Generation) with a cover version of the song "Oj, dodole" ("Oy, Dodola"), originally recorded by Kovač's former band Korni Grupa. They also participated in the recording of a new version of the Serbian rapper Gru's hit song "5ak" (a pun for "Friday"), released in 1997. Two years later, in the spring of 1999, during the NATO bombing of Yugoslavia, the band often held free afternoon concerts at the Belgrade KST club.

=== 2000s ===
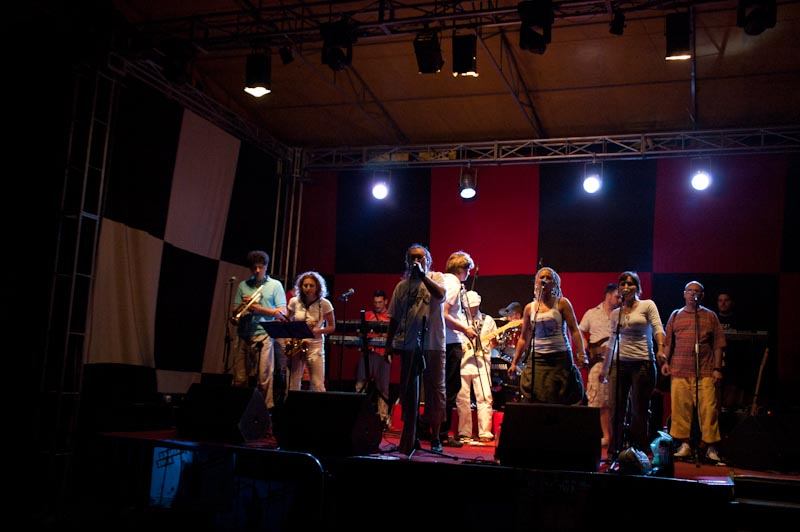
Del Arno Band performing in 2009

In 2001, the band released the double compilation album Retrospective, consisting of a selection of their most popular songs, demo recordings from the early phase and live material. In 2002, the band appeared on Ekatarina Velika frontman Milan Mladenović tribute album Kao da je bilo nekad... Posvećeno Milanu Mladenoviću (Like it Happened... Dedicated to Milan Mladenović) with a cover of Ekatarina Velika song "Novac u rukama" ("Money in My Hands").

In 2006, after a long work break, the band released their third studio album Vreme vode (Time of the Water). The album featured the material composed by the Matić brothers and recorded in a lineup which, beside them, also featured Đorde Ćurčić (guitar), Marin Petrić (percussion), Dobroslav Predić (trumpet), Aleksandar Petković (saxophone), Veroljub Spasić (a former Petar Pan member, drums), Marko Cvetković (bass guitar), Milan Petrović (keyboards), Mihajlo Bogosavljević (trombone), Tatjana Popović (backing vocals) and Tatjana Šuletić (backing vocals). For the 2007 Serbian language translation of Bob Marley biography Catch a Fire, Jovan Matić translated Marley's song "Running Away". In 2008, on the invitation by Laza Ristovski, Del Arno Band recorded a cover of his song "Marija" for his album Drvo života (Three of Life). In August of the same year, Jovan Matić, together with musicians Dado Topić, Nenad Milosavljević and Zoran Kostić "Cane", unveiled the monument to Bob Marley in Banatski Sokolac, Serbia. During the same year, Matić published a book of poems entitled Što pre to kasnije (The Sooner the Later), including his lyrics written for Del Arno Band songs.

=== 2010s ===
In 2011, on Human Rights Day, the band was awarded with the New Optimism Award by the New Optimism Movement from Zrenjanin, holding an unplugged performance on the award ceremony. On 29 September 2012, the group performed in Belgrade Youth Center, on a celebration of the 50th anniversary of Jamaica's independence. In 2015, the band recorded the song "Misli" ("Thoughts") for the various artists album Hronično neumroni (Chronically Restless), on which various artists recorded songs on lyrics by poet Milan B. Popović.

The band celebrated 30 years of activity with the release of the box set Igraj dok te ne sruše – 30 godina (Dance Until They Tear You Down – 30 Years). The five-piece box set, released in December 2016, features the band's three studio albums and one live album, as well as a disc with covers and duets originally appearing on various releases and previously unreleased material, including their cover of Riblja Čorba song "Pravila, pravila" ("Rules, Rules").

In 2019, the band released their fourth studio album, Ako ne znaš šta da radiš (If You Don't Know What to Do), the band's first release recorded without Vladan Matić. The album was previously announced by two singles, "Stari lek" ("Old Medicine") and "Još uvek ima nade" ("There Is Still Hope"), the latter recorded with their former member Nemanja "Hornsman Coyote" Kojić (who, after leaving Del Arno Band, fronted successful band Eyesburn). The album was released with a package of rolling paper.

=== 2020s ===
On 14 February 2025, the band held a concert in Belgrade's Dorćol Platz in honor of Bob Marley's 80th birthday, dedicating the concert to the students leading the Serbian anti-corruption protests.

== Legacy ==
In 2021, the album Reggaeneracija was polled No.33 on the list of 100 Best Serbian Albums Since the Breakup of SFR Yugoslavia. The list was published in the book Kako (ni)je propao rokenrol u Srbiji (How Rock 'n' Roll in Serbia (Didn't) Came to an End).

== Discography ==
=== Studio albums ===
- Igraj dok te ne sruše (1989)
- Reggaeneracija (1995)
- Vreme vode (2006)
- Ako ne znaš šta da radiš (2019)

=== Live albums ===
- Godina majmuna (1992)

=== Compilation albums ===
- Geneza (1993)
- Retrospective (2001)

=== Box sets ===
- Igraj dok te ne sruše – 30 godina

=== Singles ===
- "Bi-bap" / "Putujem" (1991)

=== Other appearances ===
- "Ne radim" (Best of 237; 1988)
- "Ima mesta za sve" (Bez struje; 1994)
- "Oj, dodole" (Moja generacija; 1996)
- "5ak" (with Gru; Time Out; 1997)
- "Novac u rukama" (Kao da je bilo nekad... Posvećeno Milanu Mladenoviću; 2002)
- "Marija" (Drvo života; 2008)
