= Love Hunters =

Serbian hard rock band

Background information
- Origin: Novi Sad, Serbia
- Genres: Punk blues, hard rock, rock
- Years active: 1987–present
- Labels: Mr Montenegro Records, Music User, Komuna Belgrade, City Records, Radio 021
- Members: Milan Mumin; Vladimir Jovanov; Milan Ljubenković; Vladimir Djurić
- Past members: Aleksandar Medan; Mario Kalin; Robert Radić; Lazar Malešević; Nikola Kostić; Siniša Lučić; Pavle Georgijević; Zlatko Drašković
- Website: www.lovehuntersband.com

Love Hunters is a Serbian hard rock band from Novi Sad.

== History ==
=== 1987–2004 ===
The band was formed in 1987 by Milan Mumin (vocals) and Aleksandar Medan (guitar). The first lineup of the band also featured Lazar Malešević (bass guitar) and Siniša Lučić (drums). In the beginning, the band had several lineup changes, before the first consistent lineup was formed. It featured Mumin, Medan, Vladimir Jovanov (also known as Menadner Protector, a former Necrophobic member, bass guitar), Mario Kalin (guitar), and Robert Radić (a former Kontraritam, La Strada and Obojeni Program member, drums).

Initially, the band was punk blues-oriented. As the band's songs featured English language lyrics, and as their first releases were released through independent record labels, the band initially did not manage to break through mainstream media. They released their debut audio cassette entitled There no Centuries in 1988 through Mr Montenegro Records. In 1993, they released their second album Everclassic through Music Yuser, and, in 1995, Oh, Evolution through the same record label. After these three releases the band gained a cult status in Novi Sad.

During the spring of 1996 the band released the album Donau (through Music Yuser) which featured almost all songs from the previous two albums. At the same time, the album Total Rickvertzzo, which featured demo recordings made during the 1987-1991 period, was released. The various artists live album Četiri godine na Golom otoku (trans. Four Years at Goli otok) featured recordings of their songs "Kamikaze" and "There's Something in the Dark", recorded at the concert in Klub Studenata Tehnike on 9 December 1995. At the beginning of May 1996, the band, alongside Goblini, Svarog and Ništa Ali Logopedi, performed in Slovenia as a part of the action entitled Srpski rock 'n' roll udarac (Serbian Rock 'n' Roll Strike). On 29 June the band performed as the opening band on Partibrejkers comeback concert held at Tašmajdan Stadium.

On 21 September 1996 the band held a concert in Belgrade's SKC. The band, under the name Live Hunters, released thirteen songs recorded on this concert and on a concert held in Zrenjanin on the live album Out Of Tune, through Komuna Belgrade at the end of 1996. During the April 1997, in Netherlands, the band recorded the album Azimuth, released by Komuna Belgrade during the same year. The album featured rerecorded track "Goodbye Love". During the 1997, the band members, Sloba Misailović, Lajko Felix, Boris Kovač, Saša Januzović, as well as several other guests wrote the music for Waver, the multimedia performance of the artist Szombathy Balint. Waver was performed by Mumin and Szombathy in Germany, Sweden, Japan, Ireland, France, Italy, Russia, Hungary, Slovakia and Serbia. In 1999, they released the live album Unplugged, which was recorded on their unplugged concert in Novi Sad's Studio M (which was the last concert of the NS Plus Unplugged series). The concert featured Dušan Šević of Simić Quartet on piano and Hammond organ as guest musician.

In 2000, the band released the album Harley Krishna. The album featured different sound than the band's previous releases, as the songs featured brass and acoustic string instruments. The album featured numerous musicians, including Saša Lokner (of Bajaga i Instruktori) on keyboards and Zoran Maletić (formerly of Laboratorija Zvuka and Griva) on guitar. The song "On The Broom" featured lyrics from William Shakespeare's poem. The album featured a cover of The Doors' song "Touch Me". During that summer, the band held a series of concerts across Italy. In 2002, the band released the album One Hunt through City Records. The album featured covers of songs by ABBA, Spandau Ballet, Tom Waits, Duran Duran, Rod Stewart, and other artists. Several music videos were recorded in France and Ireland and directed by Mumin himself.

In 2003 the band went on hiatus, as Mumin went to New York City. After his return in 2004, the band released the live album Live in Bistro, which featured a recording of their performance in café Bistro in Novi Sad. In 2004, the band disbanded.

=== 2011–present ===
In July 2011, the band reunited in the original lineup and in 2012, the band released the DVD Live in Novi Sad 2011, recorded on their 2011 performance on Štrand city beach in Novi Sad. Same year, the rock musical Love Hunter, featuring Love Hunters songs and starring Mumin and Jelena Stupljanin, was shot. The film, based on Mumin's experiences during his life in the United States, was shot in New York City, and directed by brothers Nemanja and Brane Bala.

In December 2015, the band released their comeback album, Suck Disease. The album was previously announced by the singles "Black & Blue", released in February 2014, and "Suck Disease", released in December 2015. The album was released on CD and vinyl. During 2015, Love Hunter was screened in Chicago, Miami, Washington, San Francisco, Toronto, Las Vegas and Los Angeles, being praised by The New York Times.

== Milan Mumin's side projects ==
Milan Mumin wrote soundtracks for two theater plays: August Strindberg's Miss Julie and William Shakespeare's A Midsummer Night's Dream, performed in Novi Sad. He also wrote a books of poems: Fanatic & The not - no Songs.

Milan Mumin played a series of concerts during 2008 (including 2008 EXIT festival) with his new music project Moomin where he has played new songs as well as old Love Hunters songs. In 2009, he participated in the Serbian version of Big Brother VIP, where he was voted out after two weeks. In March 2009, he published his first solo album Asthma Sky on City Records label under Milan Mumin and the Undercover Maniacs moniker. In 2016, his second solo album "In case that one of them is you" was published in U.S. for "PLUS SIZED DAN" label from Atlanta, GA.

== Discography ==
=== Studio albums ===
- There No Centuries (1988)
- Everclassic (1994)
- Oh Evolution (1995)
- Donau (1996)
- Total Rickverzzo (1996)
- Azimuth (1997)
- Harley Krishna (2001)
- One Hunt (2002)
- Suck Disease (2015)

=== Live albums ===
- Out of Tune (1996)
- Unplugged (1999)
- Live in Bistro (2004)

=== Video albums ===
- Live in Bistro (2004)
- Live in Novi Sad 2011 (2012)

== Other sources ==
- EX YU ROCK enciklopedija 1960-2006, Janjatović Petar; ISBN 978-86-905317-1-4
- NS rockopedija, novosadska rock scena 1963-2003, Mijatović Bogomir; Publisher: SWITCH, 2005
