= Goblini (album) =

Studio album by Goblini
- Released: 1994
- Recorded: Do-Re-Mi studio, Novi Sad; July, November 1993
- Genre: Punk rock
- Length: 27:43
- Label: Music YUser; MY 008
- Producer: Predrag Pejić, Goblini

Goblini chronology
Goblini (1994)	Istinite priče I deo (1994)

Goblini (The Goblins) is the debut album by the Serbian punk rock band Goblini released by Music YUser independent record label in 1994. The album, available in its entirety only on compact cassette, was partially rereleased as bonus tracks on the 1998 CD reissue of Istinite priče I deo, for which some of the tracks from the debut were rerecorded due to the band's dissatisfaction with the album production.

== Track listing ==
=== Rock side ===
No.	Title	Length
1.	"Ципјонка (Intro)"	2:20
2.	"Komad noći" (A piece of the night)	2:28
3.	"Elesdi se vraća kući" (LSD is returning home)	2:56
4.	"Dan posle" (The day after)	3:05
5.	"Mame" (Mothers)	2:36

=== Roll side ===
No.	Title	Length
1.	"Keep away from children"	3:23
2.	"Reci da" (Say yes)	3:01
3.	"Ja možda i bi" (I Probably Would Have)	3:41
4.	"Znam" (I know)	3:15
5.	"Ципјонка (Base Erotic Remix)"	1:12

== Personnel ==
- Vlada Kokotović — bass, backing vocals
- Nenad Divnić "Kića" — drums
- Alen Jovanović — guitar, backing vocals
- Branko Golubović "Golub" — vocals
- Predrag Pejić — producer, recorded by
- Aleksandra & Aleksandra — vocals on B5
- Miša Bogunović — artwork by [design]
