= Istinite priče I deo =

Studio album by Goblini
- Released: 1994
- Recorded: Do-Re-Mi studio, Novi Sad; November 1993, August 1994
- Genre: Punk rock
- Length: 36:35
- Label: Metropolis Records; MRK 1101
- Producer: Predrag Pejić, Goblini

Goblini chronology
Goblini (1994)	Istinite priče I deo (1994)	KST Live 31.08.'95 (1995)

Reissue cover

Professional ratings
Review scores
Source	Rating
Ritam	3/5 stars

Istinite priče I deo (True Stories Part I) is the second studio album by the Serbian punk rock band Goblini, released by Metropolis Records in 1994. The album was available on compact cassette only, until it was rereleased with five tracks from the debut album as bonus tracks in 1998 as the second disc of the Turneja u magnovenju 96/97 live album.

== Track listing ==
All music, lyrics and arrangements by Goblini, except the tracks 2 and 3, written by Aleksandar Nišević and Darko Dobrodolac.

No.	Title	Length
1.	"Ponedeljak" (Monday)	2:39
2.	"Dan "D"" (D-Day)	3:14
3.	"Ja možda i bi" (I Probably Would Have)	3:46
4.	"Cipjonka"	2:25
5.	"Sam-phone-glas" (Alone-phone-voice)	5:57
6.	"eLeSDi se vraća kuci" (LSD is returning home)	3:02
7.	"Godine raspleta" (The denouement years)	4:36
8.	"Internacionala (Made In Serbia)" (Comintern (Made in Serbia))	3:03
9.	"Dan posle" (The day after)	3:08
10.	"Komad noći" (A piece of the night)	2:34
11.	"In Memoriam"	2:23
12.	"Za Lorenu" (For Lorena)	2:02

=== Bonus tracks on the 1998 CD reissue ===
No.	Title	Length
1.	"Mame" (Mothers)	2:44
2.	"Keep away from children"	3:31
3.	"Znam" (I know)	3:21
4.	"Reci da" (Say yes)	3:08
5.	"Cipjonka (Base Erotic Remix)"	1:12

== Personnel ==
- Vlada Kokotović — bass, backing vocals
- Nedeljko Nedić "Meketa" — drums, backing vocals
- Nenad Divnić "Kića" — drums (tracks 3, 4, 6, 10, 11)
- Alen Jovanović — guitar, backing vocals
- Branko Golubović "Golub" — vocals
- Predrag Pejić — producer, recorded by
- Aleksandar Stamenković — recorded by
- Leo Fon Punkerstain — artwork by
- Petra — photography by
