= Goblini =

Serbian punk rock band

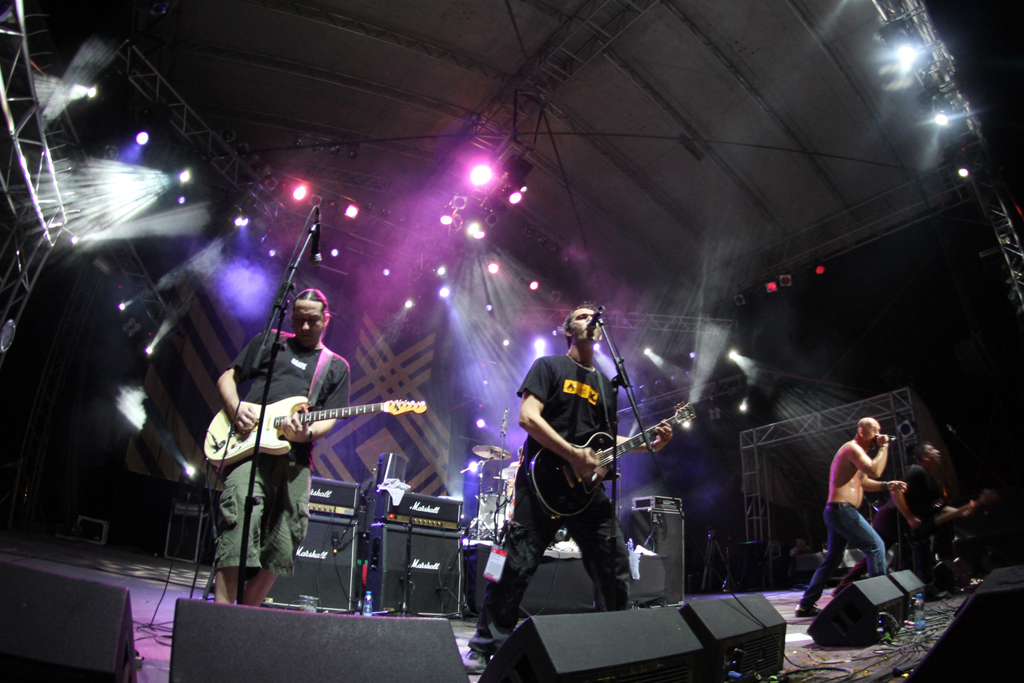
- Goblini performing at the 2012 EXIT festival

Background information
- Origin: Šabac, Serbia
- Genres: Punk rock, alternative rock
- Years active: 1992 – 2001; 2010 – present
- Labels: Myusic YUser, Metropolis Records, Mortal Kombat, Hi-Fi Centar, Kulturni Centar Šabac, Multimedia Records
- Members: Branko Golubović; Alen Jovanović; Leonid Pilipović; Vladislav Kokotović; Milan Arnautović
- Past members: Nenad Divinić; Nedeljko Nedić; Zoran Jović; Saša Šetka; Vladimir Cinklocki; Zoran Jovanović
- Website: www.goblini.com

Goblini (Serbian Cyrillic: Гоблини; trans. The Goblins) are a Serbian punk rock band from Šabac.

== History ==
=== Formation, rise to prominence (1992–1999) ===
Guitarist Alen Jovanović and Vladislav Kokotović "Vlada", who lived in Karlovac, played in the band Lorelei until 1991 when they disbanded. Having played with numerous bands from Zagreb, the two moved to Šabac, and in March 1992, with the vocalist Branko Golubović, formed Goblini. The band changed several drummers until Nenad Divnić came to the band. The lineup recorded the first album Goblini (The Goblins), released on compact cassette only, and released in small printing in April 1994. The A-side of the cassette included songs from the Lorelei period and the B-side featured new material.

A few months later Divnić went to the army and was replaced by Nedeljko Nedić "Meketa" with whom the band recorded the second album Istinite priče I deo (True Stories Part I), also released on cassette only. The album featured "Cipjonka", "eLeSDi se vraca kući" ("LSD Is Returning Home") and "Za Lorenu" ("For Loreena") and five rerecorded tracks from the first album. Divnić recorded drum sections for a part of the material. Later that year, the band was joined by Džukele guitarist Leonid Pilipović, also known as Leo fon Punkerstein, since his band took a work-break, as the band members went to serve the army. In May 1995, Nedić left for Cyprus and was replaced by Zoran Jović "Fric".

During the same year, the band released their first live album, KST Live 31.08.'95, a live cassette of their performance at the Belgrade KST on 31 August 1995. Among the songs, the band played cover versions of KUD Idijoti songs "Pisma o ribaru Marinu, Mari i moru" ("Song about the Fisherman Marin, Mara and the Sea") and "Minijatura" ("A Miniature"), Ramones songs "Sheena Is a Punk Rocker" and "Commando" and a version of The Clash cover of "I Fought the Law", with lyrics in Serbian language entitled "Ne mogu više" ("I Cannot Bear It"), which were regularly performed on concerts. "Ne mogu više" was dedicated to the president Slobodan Milošević and the last part of the song featured the chorus of the Talking Heads's track "Road to Nowhere". The band also played Boris Novković's song "Tamara" since Jovanović was for a time a part of Novković's backing band, and the cover of Demolition 23 track "Same Shit, Different Day", featuring Pilipović on lead vocals.

With the producer Aca Radosavljević the band recorded the CD U magnovenju (In the Flash) and during the promotional tour for the album Plipović returned to Džukele, being replaced by Saša Šetka. The album featured "On je ona je" ("It Is Him It Is Her"), "Ima nas!" ("There is a Lot of Us"), "Petra", "Vođa" ("The Leader") and a cover of Videosex song "Kako bih volio da si tu" ("How I Wish You Were Here"), renamed "Anja, volim te" ("Anja, I Love You"), dedicated to the Videosex vocalist Anja Rupel. During May 1996, with the bands Svarog, Love Hunters and Ništa Ali Logopedi, Goblini went on a Slovenian tour. In June, they got the call to perform at the Zgaga Rock festival at the place Hotič pri Litiji near Ljubljana, after which they toured Slovenia again during Autumn 1996.

Live versions of their three songs were included on a various artists compilation Paket Aranžman - Svi protiv svih (Package Deal - Everybody Against Everyone) recorded at the Belgrade KST performance held to celebrate the fifth birthday of the TV Politika show Paket Aranžman. In June 1997, the band toured Slovenia and performed at the second Zgaga Rock festival with a new drummer, Vladimir Cinkocki "Cina", a former Generacija Bez Budućnosti and Obojeni Program member. The band's live recordings were also included on a double live various artists compilation No Border Jam 4 & 5 released in 1997, featuring "Ona misli da zna" ("She Thinks that She Knows"), "U magnovenju" and "eLeSDi se vraca kuci" recorded at Ilirska Bistrica performance in 1996. In August 1997, the band performed as an opening act for Motörhead in Budapest.

In 1998, twenty recordings from thirteen cities made in Serbia and Slovenia from 1996 and 1997 were released on a double CD Turneja u magnovenju 96/97 (In the Flash Tour 96/97). Beside the live recordings, the first CD featured a new studio track "Punk's Not Dead". The second CD was a reissued version of Istinite priče I deo, featuring a five-track bonus material released on the first studio album. On November of the same year, Cinklocki left the band when they were about to enter the studio to record the fourth studio album. The album Re Contra was finished on the day 1999 NATO bombing of the Federal Republic of Yugoslavia started, which was the reason why the album was not released until December 1999. In the meantime, the band went on a nine-date Italian tour including Milan, Rome, Bologna and Turin.

=== Breakup and post-breakup (2000–2009) ===
From January 2000 until the Spring of 2001, the band toured Serbia. After the tour, the band took a break and started preparing their next album, but the economic situation in the country lead Branko Golubović, Alen Jovanović, Saša Šetka, Vlada Kokotović and drummer Milan Arnautović to perform their last concert at the Zagreb club Močvara on 7 June 2001, before parting their ways. The following year, One Records reissued the album U magnovenju.

Alen Jovanović (far right) performing with Starfuckers at the 2009 Nisomnia festival in Niš

In 2003, Alen Jovanović formed the band Starfuckers featuring members from Plexus, Midgard and CBS. During the same year, Golubović, as a member of the Italian humanitarian organization INTERSOS went to Afghanistan in order to work as a volunteer, and in 2007 he moved to Sri Lanka.

In 2004, Multimedia Records released Najbolje priče (The Best Stories) a greatest hits compilation featuring live versions of songs performed at the band's peak. The compilation also featured the recording of "Pričaš" ("You Are Talking"), an unreleased track recorded in 1997. Promotional videos for the "Pričaš" and "Voz" ("Train") were also included on the release.

In 2006, Živko Ivković from Šabac released a book called Od Čivija do Goblina (From The Machine Heads to The Goblins) with a subtitle "Illustrated Rock History of Šabac 1963-1999-2006", featuring the band's biography and a CD compilation featuring the band's song "Daleki put". During the same year, Milan Arnautović formed the band Siempre Peligroso, and in 2008, he formed Eleven, with whom he released two albums A Moment of Silence and Težina Okova, and also in 2015 EP Randevu.

In 2009 Golubović released a book of his Afghanistan memoirs Pisma iz Avganistana (Letters from Afghanistan). During the same year, Multimedia Records released a various artists compilation Groovanje devedesete uživo featuring a live version of "Cipjonka" recorded at the Belgrade club Prostor on 11 November 1995.

=== Reformation (2010–present) ===
Goblini in 2010, from left to right: Branko Golubović, Milan Arnautović, Vlada Kokotović, Alen Jovanović, Saša Šetka

On 21 June 2010 the band announced the reunion of the lineup which nine years prior had performed the last concert, and a CD single release, featuring two new songs. On 10 August 2010, three days before the band performed the first reunion tour show, the CD single entitled Crno na belo (Black on White) was released, featuring the song "Luna" ("Luna"), written during the first rehearsal the reunited lineup had made in May 2010 and dealing with drug abuse problems, and the song "Kao da" ("As If") as the B-side, written during the 1996 U magnovenju recording sessions.

The band held their comeback concert at the Šabac Summer Festival on 13 August 2010. The performance featured a song selection spanning the whole career. During the performance of the song "Daleki put", a visitor had thrown a rock to the stage, hitting Golubović in the face and causing him minor injuries. The encore, opened by the new track "Luna", featured cover versions of the Ramones songs "Bonzo Goes to Bitburg" and "Sheena Is a Punk Rocker" and Demolition 23 song "Same Shit, Different Day", often performed by the band throughout their career, after which the band performed Boris Novković's "Tamara", with Atheist Rap vocalist Aleksandar Popov "Dr. Pop" and the former member Nedeljko Nedić "Meketa" on drums. Popov also did vocals on the last track of the performance, "Anja, volim te". After the Šabac concert, the band held a tour with five dates only (Zrenjanin, Belgrade, Kočevje, Ljubljana and Banja Luka) and went on hiatus, since Golubović, currently living in Georgia, was to go on a humanitarian mission to Pakistan.

In November 2010, the single "Luna" appeared on the sixth place of the Jelen Top 10 list and remained on the Top 10 list for four weeks. At the beginning of 2011, "Kao da" was voted No. 2 on the list of Best Domestic Songs in 2010, and the video for "Luna" was voted the Best Domestic Video in 2010 by the readers of the webzine Popboks. On 2 January 2011 a documentary about the band entitled Ima nas gomila (There Is A Buch Of Us) was premiered at RTV Vojvodina, also being available for free digital download at the station's official website. The documentary, directed by Predrag Novković, was recorded from June until September 2010, and beside featuring almost the entire band personnel, also featured the appearances of journalist, critics, concert promoters and other people related to the band's work throughout their active career.

In 2011, the band held a fifteen date tour (including performances at the Belgrade Beer Fest, Vila! La Pola Fest in Pula and Koncert godine in Novi Sad) and released the single "U odbrani zla" ("In Defense of Evil"), featuring guest appearances by Grate and Plug'n'play member Goran Beg, Grate member Dragan Alimpijević "Pik" and Pero Defformero member Goran Biševac "Biške" on backing vocals, available for free digital download at the Nocturne magazine official website. In August 2012, Šetka left Goblini and was replaced by Leonid Pilipović. On 15 September 2012 Goblini performed at the Warrior's Dance festival, organized by British group The Prodigy and Exit festival, on Belgrade's Kalemegdan.

In November 2013, the band released their comeback album, entitled Roba s greškom (Faulty Merchandise), through Long Play. The album was previously announced by the single "Deca iz komšiluka" ("Neighborhood Kids"). On 8 March 2014 the band held a concert in Belgrade's Hala sportova, as a part of Roba s greškom promotional tour. The concert featured numerous guests: Partibrejkers vocalist Zoran Kostić "Cane" and guitarist Nebojša Antonijević "Anton", Atheist Rap vocalist Aleksandar Popov "Dr Pop" and guitarist Vladimir Radusinović "Radule" and the brass section consisting of Eyesburn member Nemanja Kojić "Kojot", Deca Loših Muzičara momber Borislav Veličković and Eyesburn and Plejboj member Dušan Petrović.

On July 9, 2015, the band opened the Novi Sad Exit Festival with performance on the festival's main stage. In 2016, the band appeared on various artists album Za tebe - A Tibute to KUD Idijoti (For You - A Tribute to KUD Idijoti) with the cover of KUD Idijoti song "Marjane, Marjane" ("Marjan, (Oh,) Marjan").

== Discography ==
- Goblini (1994)
- Istinite priče I deo (1994)
- U magnovenju (1996)
- Re Contra (1999)
- Roba s greškom (2013)
- Jednina (2019)

== Bibliography ==
- EX YU ROCK enciklopedija 1960-2006, Janjatović Petar; ISBN 978-86-905317-1-4
