= KST Live 31.08.'95 =

Live album by Goblini
- Released: 1995
- Recorded: August 31, 1995; KST, Belgrade
- Genre: Punk rock
- Length: 48:08
- Label: Mortal Combat Records
- Producer: Z. Ivetić

Goblini live chronology
Istinite priče I deo (1994)	KST Live 31.08.'95 (1995)	U magnovenju (1996)

KST Live 31.08.'95 is the first live album by the Serbian punk rock band Goblini released in 1995, on compact cassette only, by the Mortal Combat records indie record label. The album features cover versions of KUD Idijoti "Pisma o ribaru Marinu, Mari i moru" and "Minijatura", Ramones "Sheena Is a Punk Rocker" and "Commando" and a version of The Clash cover of "I Fought the Law", with lyrics in Serbian entitled "Ne mogu više". The band also played Boris Novković's song "Tamara" since Jovanović was a part of Novković's backing band with guest appearance by Atheist Rap vocalist Dr. Pop on lead vocals. The cover of Demolition 23 track "Same Shit Different Day" featured Leonid Pilipović on lead vocals.

== Track listing ==
No.	Title	Length
1.	"Intro"	0:35
2.	"Dan posle" (The day after)	2:42
3.	"Komad noći" (A piece of the night)	2:15
4.	"Ona misli da zna" (She thinks she knows)	3:00
5.	"Ponedeljak" (Monday)	2:19
6.	"Internacionala" (Comintern)	2:30
7.	"U magnovenju" (In the flash)	3:27
8.	"Godine raspleta" (The denouement years)	1:35
9.	"In Memoriam"	2:42
10.	"Ne mogu više" (I can't handle it anymore, I Fought the Law cover by The Clash)	1:53
11.	"Commando" (The Ramones cover)	1:24
12.	"Sheena Is a Punk Rocker" (The Ramones cover)	1:55
13.	"Pesma o ribaru Marinu, Mari i moru" (The song about the fisherman Marin, Mara and the sea; KUD Idijoti cover)	1:39
14.	"Minijatura" (Miniature; KUD Idijoti cover)	2:46
15.	"Kuda idu izgubljene devojke (Tamara)" (Where do all the lost girls go (Tamara); Boris Novković cover)	2:33
16.	"ElEsDi Se Vraća Kući" (LSD is returning home)	2:27
17.	"Cipjonka" (Hen)	1:30
18.	"Same Shit Different Day" (Demolition 23 cover)	2:55

== Personnel ==
- Vlada Kokotović — bass
- Zoran Jević "Fric" — drums
- Alen Jovanović — guitar
- Leo fon Punkerstain — guitar, vocals on track 18
- Branko Golubović "Golub" — vocals
- Z. Ivetić — producer, recorded by
- Fića KST — recorded by
- Žalosna Sova — artwork by [design]
- Dr. Pop — vocals on track 15
