= Ništa Ali Logopedi =

Serbian alternative rock band

Background information
- Origin: Šabac, Serbia; Yugoslavia
- Genres: Alternative rock, punk rock, hardcore punk, folk rock, comedy rock
- Years active: 1992 – 1998; 2016 – present
- Labels: L.V.O. Records, ITMM, Vreme Zabave, Kulturni Centar Šabac, Multimedia Records
- Members: Aleksandar Stanojević; Darko Veljić; Dejan Stojanović; Dragoljub Marković; Milan Katanić; Miodrag Jovanović
- Past members: Aleksandar Stojanović; Aleksandar Cvejić; Igor Đorić

Ništa Ali Logopedi (Serbian Cyrillic: Ништа Али Логопеди; trans. Nothing But Logopedists) is a Serbian alternative rock band from Šabac.

== History ==
=== 1992–1998 ===
The band was formed in late 1992, and the first lineup consisted of Miodrag Jovanović "Miško" (vocals), Aleksandar Cvejić "Cveja" (bass guitar), Aleksandar Stojanovic "Džoja" (drums), Igor Đorić "Đora" (guitar), Darko Veljić (accordion). and Dragoljub Marković (also known as "BlEQ" or "Dr Dra") (keyboard). Couple of Years later, after Đora, Cveja and Džoja left the band, their places in the group took Aleksandar Stanojević (bass guitar), Milan Katanić "Skener" (guitar) and Dejan Stojanović "Kroka" (drums). From its initial era, the band had drawn attention of the public with their folk music-oriented accordion sound combined with punk rock and humorous lyrics.

In 1994 the band appeared on the Zaječar Gitarijada Festival and won the Audience Award as the best band. In the meantime they prepared their debut album, recorded in the Do Re Mi studio in Novi Sad, which was released during the following year. Ad Hoc Klića (Ad hoc Clitoris), available on compact cassette only, was released through L.V.O. records and featured guest appearances by Goblini guitarist Alen Jovanović, who provided backing vocals for the tracks "Svadbarski omaž za 6 osoba" ("A Wedding Homage for 6 Persons") and "Janjine Janjine" ("Ioannina, Ioannina"), promotional videos were recorded for both tracks, and Igor Đorić "Ipi" who played lead guitar on half of the album tracks. The songs "Pigs From Space", "Stao sam na Stone Called Crazy" ("I've Stood on a Stone Called Crazy"), "Janjine, Janjine" and "Jarmush Jim Rap" showed the band's sense of humor with lyrics dealing with pork, wedding ceremonies, an featuring quotations from school literature such as an English language beginners coursebook.

In 1995, the band appeared on the various artists live compilation Gruvanje Vol. 1 with the song "Janjine Janjine", recorded live in Belgrade's Dom Omladine. During May 1996 the band toured Slovenia with the bands Svarog, Goblini and Love Hunters, but without Darko Veljić on accordion. Having finished touring, they entered the Akademija studio in Belgrade to record their second album Vaspostavljanje (Restoration). The album featured many guest appearances including Block Out members, guitarist Nikola Vranjković and vocalist Milutin Jovančić "Mita". The track "Prporuša" featured lyrics of a folk song Vuk Stefanović Karadžić had noted while visiting Lika, and "Tonski zapis" ("Sound Recording"), was recorded in 1996 at their appearance in Ilirska Bistrica. Even though the album recording was finished by September, it was released two years later by ITMM. Promotional videos were recorded for the track "Serbs" as well as for the cover of Idoli song "Plastika" ("Plastics"), renamed to "Metaloplastika".

The album was well acclaimed by the critics, but the media paid insufficient attention to the album release which, beside the departure of the bassist Stanojević to the United States of America, was the reason for Ništa Ali Logopedi to disband in 1998. Accordionist Veljić joined VROOM, and vocalist Jovanović, inspired by his military service during the NATO bombing of Yugoslavia, wrote a poetry book entitled Vi, bedni, odvratni civili (You, Disgusting, Pathetic Civilians) published in 2000, and is currently a professor at the Belgrade University Faculty of Law.

=== Post breakup ===
In 2006, Živko Ivković wrote the book about the Šabac rock scene entitled Od Čivija do Goblina which included a CD compilation featuring the band's song "Serbs". In 2009, a live version of "Janjine, Janjine" appeared on the Multimedia records various artists compilation Groovanje devedesete uživo. In 2015 Milan Katanić joined band Eleven and in 2016 together with Miki Stanković formed space rock band MOON and in 2018 released album Maybe We'll Come Back.

=== 2016 reunion ===
The band reunited in 2016. They had their first performance after the reunion on December 28 on Nikola Vranjković's concert in Belgrade's Dom omladine.

== Discography ==
=== Studio albums ===
- Ad hoc klića (1994)
- Vaspostavljanje (1998)

=== Other appearances ===
- "Janjine, Janjine" (Groovanje devedesete uživo; 2009)

== See also ==
- Punk rock in Yugoslavia
