= Re Contra =

Studio album by Goblini
- Released: 1999
- Recorded: Akademija, Belgrade; November 1998 – January 1999
- Genre: Punk rock; alternative rock
- Length: 71:11
- Label: Metropolis Records; MCD 025 / MRK 6101
- Producer: Aleksandar Radosavljević

Goblini chronology
Turneja u magnovenju 96/97 (1998)	Re Contra (1999)	Najbolje priče (2004)

Re Contra is the fourth studio album by the Serbian punk rock band Goblini, released by Metropolis Records in 1999.

== Track listing ==
All music, lyrics and arrangements by Goblini.

No.	Title	Length
1.	"Trag" (A Trace)	2:55
2.	"Nostalgija" (Nostalgia)	2:30
3.	"TV"	2:50
4.	"Dr. Hoffmann" (Doctor Hofman)	2:58
5.	"Na ivici" (On the edge)	3:01
6.	"Ne trebam nikome" (Nobody needs me)	4:47
7.	"Telefon" (Telephone)	2:44
8.	"Nagrada" (Reward)	3:07
9.	"Daleki put" (A long road)	4:42
10.	"7"	3:33
11.	"Znam" (I know)	2:41
12.	"Voz" (The train)	4:00
13.	"(hidden track)"	31:27

== Personnel ==
=== The band ===
- Vladislav Kokotović — bass, backing vocals
- Milan Arnautović "Firca" — drums
- Alen Jovanović — guitar, backing vocals
- Saša Šetka — guitar, backing vocals
- Branko Golubović "Golub" — vocals

=== Additional personnel ===
- Dragoljub Marković — keyboards, backing vocals
- Nikola Vranjković — recorded by, guitar, backing vocals
- Aleksandar Radosavljević "Acke" — producer, engineer [postproduction], backing vocals
- Velja Mijanović — engineer [postproduction]
- Bora Veličković — trumpet
- Nemanja Kojić "Kojot" — trombone, backing vocals
- Dušan Petrović "Dile" — saxophone
- Aca — backing vocals
- Aleksandar Balać "Lale" — backing vocals
- Aleksandar Petrović "Aca Celtic" — backing vocals
- Saša Milenković "Sale" — backing vocals
- Vladimir Lazić "Laza" — backing vocals
- Zoran Đuroski "Đura Misterious" — backing vocals
- David Vartabedijan — artwork by [design, layout, prepress]
- Nebojša Stanković "Kulja" — photography, artwork by [front cover design]
