= SKCNS =

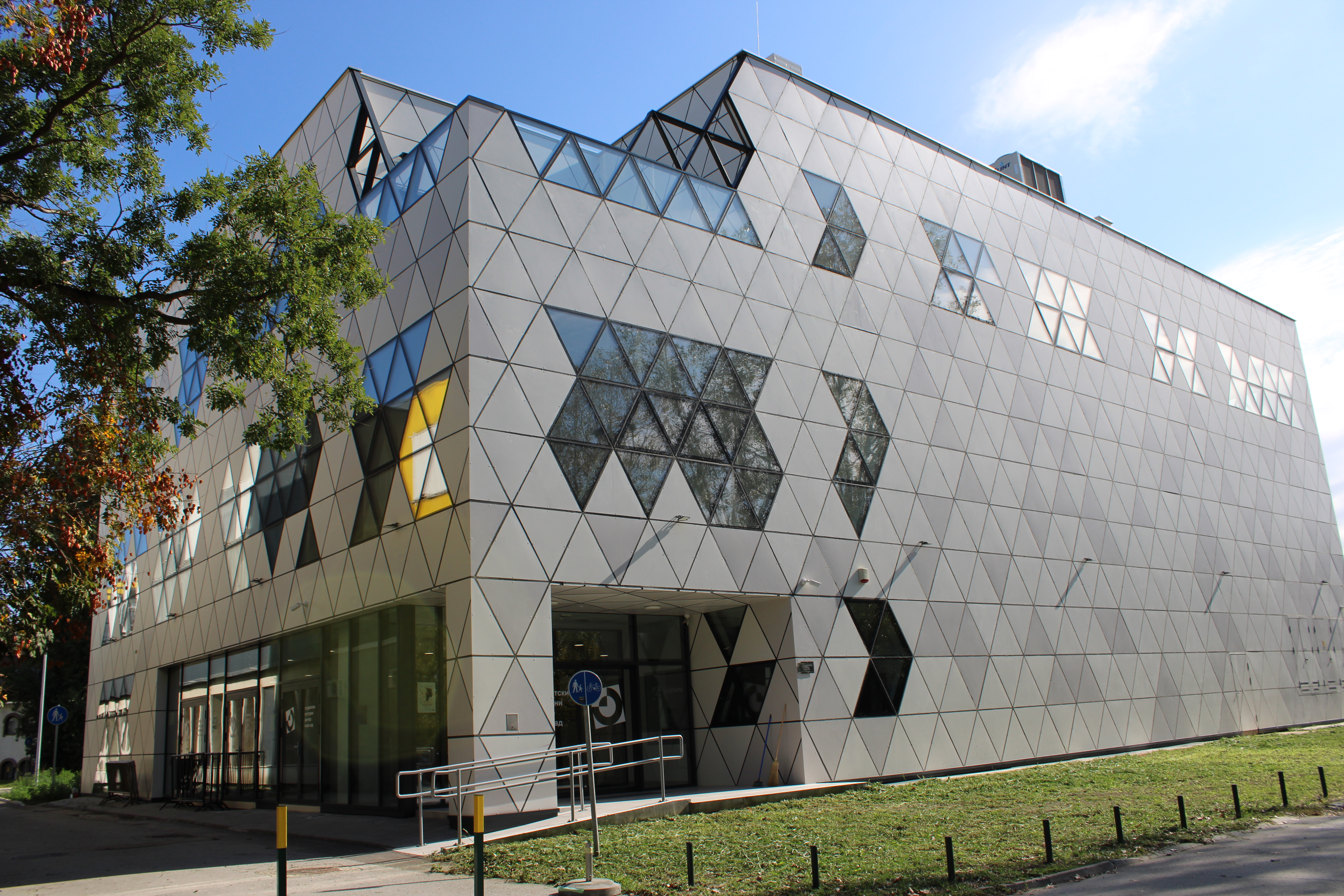
Student Cultural Center Novi Sad

Studentski Kulturni Centar Novi Sad (SKCNS) is an organisation working under the umbrella of the Executive Council of Vojvodina in Novi Sad, Serbia. It is the organiser of several regular cultural events in the region, and is also a record label and publisher for local artists.

== Status ==
SKCNS was founded by the Government of Vojvodina in 1993 and was re-registered in 2003 to comply with the new law on Vojvodina’s autonomy passed in 2002. It was the third Student Cultural Centre to be founded in Serbia after those in Belgrade and Niš.

The Government of Vojvodina mandated SKCNS to support education in the region through the promotion of local culture. SKCNS is financed by the Ministry of Education of the Republic of Serbia. Its director (currently Zdravko Vulin) is appointed on a four-year mandate by the Executive Council of the Autonomous Province of Vojvodina, which also appoints the Steering Committee and Supervisory Board of the institution.

SKCNS has two physical locations – its main office is part of the complex of the University of Novi Sad, and its main events space is in a converted disused factory (known as Fabrika) on Bulevar Despota Stefana in Novi Sad.

== Activities ==
Since 1993, SKCNS has run a regular programme of cultural events, including concerts, speeches, debates, round table meetings and art exhibitions, primarily aimed at students at the University of Novi Sad, making it one of the longest-running cultural actors in Vojvodina.

SKCNS currently organises three major annual events in addition to the regular programme:

To Be Punk – In May 2008, SKCNS launched To Be Punk, with the intention of creating the first regular punk festival in Serbia. Up to and including 2011, there had been four To Be Punks, including performances by: Sham 69, Cockney Rejects and Guitar Gangsters (UK), The Cute Lepers (USA), Goblini, Ritam Nereda, Atheist Rap and Mitesers (Serbia)

Ritam Evrope! – The Government of Vojvodina and SKCNS decided in 2007 to organise an annual celebration of Europe Day and the victory over fascism, to be held on or around 9 May in Novi Sad’s main square, Trg Slobode. The original Ritam Evrope (Rhythm of Europe) concert has developed into a festival that plays to crowds of over 10,000. Around 40,000 spectators have watched the concerts in Ritam Evrope's five year history (2007–11). Notable performers include: Jinx (Croatia), Talco (Italy), Skarface (France), Peter and the Test Tube Babies and The Adicts (UK) and Ringišpil and Atheist Rap from Novi Sad.

Vojvođanski Strip Vikend – On 2 November 2007, SKCNS launched an annual gathering for fans of comic strips and comic art, aiming to bring together producers, writers, artists and other performers, featuring live workshops and new comic launches. SKCNS has announced that the 5th edition will be held on 11–12 November 2011.

== Role as a producer/promoter ==
SKCNS branched out into producing music for acts from Novi Sad in 1995, and shortly afterwards began publishing comic books as well. In recent years, a large part of the SKCNS record label's releases have been in the punk genre, including by: Atheist Rap, Mitesers, Ritam Nereda and Goblini. It has also released reggae, ska and classical works, in the latter category including by Aleksandra Vrebalov.

According to its own website, SCKNS aims to release between 2-5 comic books a year, but has only released two since 2008, by Aleksandar Zograf and Wostok.
