= Multimedia Records =

- Founded: 2002
- Founder: Marko Gasperlin, Rodoljub Stojanović, Jadranka Janković-Nešić
- Status: Active
- Genre: Various
- Country of origin: Serbia
- Location: Belgrade
- Official website: www.multimediarec.rs

Multimedia Records (stylized as MULTIMEDIArecords) is a Serbian music label based in Belgrade.

== History ==
Multimedia Records was founded in February 2002 by Marko Gasperlin, Rodoljub Stojanović and Jadranka Janković-Nešić. During first eight years, company was represented by Universal Music Group as their licensed partner.

Multimedia Records developed a brand of Universal Music in Serbia, distributing their releases. Serbian shows of Universal Music Group artists such as 50 Cent, Rihanna, Mark Knopfler, Kaiser Chiefs, Bryan Adams, Metallica, Busta Rhymes and The Police were hosted by Multimedia Records.

In 2003, Multimedia Records became a member of International Federation of the Phonographic Industry.

Multimedia Records have license to distribute releases from various regional record companies in Serbia. Some of those record companies are Aquarius Records, Croatia Records, Hit Records (Croatia) and Menart Records (Slovenia).

Through partnership agreement with Menart Records from 2008., Multimedia Records obtained rights to distribute Sony BMG releases in Serbia.

== Artists ==
Some of the artist currently signed to Multimedia Records, or have been so in the past, include:

- Ajs Nigrutin
- Atheist Rap
- Block Out
- Cubismo
- Dejan Cukić
- Doktor Spira i Ljudska Bića
- Dža ili Bu
- Emina Jahović
- Goblini
- Marčelo
- Srđan Marjanović
- Night Shift
- Pero Defformero
- Prljavi Inspektor Blaža i Kljunovi
- Rare
- Six Pack
- Slobodan Trkulja
- Sunshine
- Wikluh Sky
- LAUTA DJ

== See also ==
- List of record labels
