= Agropop =

Slovenian pop band

- Genres: Pop, turbo-folk
- Years active: 1984-2000
- Past members: Aleš Klinar; Barbara Šerbec; Polde Poljanšek; Simon Pavlica; Urban Centa; Dragan Trivič; Mark Čuček; Veronika Cetin; Marko Lednik

Agropop was a Slovenian pop band.

Agropop was active from 1984 - 2000. Band's main leader was Ales "Klinči" Klinar (vocals and keyboard), together with Barbara "Šerbi" Šerbec (vocals), Polde Poljanšek (saxophone and guitar), Simon Pavlica (guitar), Urban Centa (bass guitar) and Dragan Trivič (drums).

Startup of the band was very unusual. Polde Poljanšek, Barbara "Šerbi" Šerbec and one other man wrote some funny songs, which were recorded primarily as a joke without any big expectations. This songs were heard by radio editors and they reported them to a Pop workshop titled Paradni tango (Tango parade). Later Agropop wrote a song Mesarjev sin (Butchers son). In the startup of Agropop there was another singer, which already sang in the group called Srečanje, where Aleš "Klinči" Klinar was also a band member. Barbara Šerbec was first meant to be the dancer in the group and not a singer. Second week after the Pop workshop they got invitations for the concerts, but the band didn't have enough songs, yet. Under the name Bugatti they first played in Črna na Koroškem as a pre-group of Marjan Smode. First independent concert they had in Zeleni Gaj where they shocked the public, because they made fun from Slovenian characters, which was pretty unusual for that time. Their main characters in the songs were firemen and farmers they also dealt with the problems of alcoholism. They wrote mainly turbofolk and pop songs targeted at larger population. They also had a concert in Tivoli Hall, where 8000 people attended, which was a big success at that time, because mostly foreign bands played in Tivoli Hall at that time.

One of their biggest hits was Samo miljon (Only a million), which was sold in 110.000 releases. Overall they sold half a million cassettes and vinyls. They were also a pre-group of Leningrad Cowboys in Križanke. In the year 2010 they released their last album of live hits, because the band tried to raise funds for the ill member of the group Barbara "Šerbi" Šerbec.

The band released 15 albums in 16 years, from which one was a live album and one was a hit mix album.

== Discography ==
1. Melodije polja in sonca (1984) (ZKP RTV Ljubljana)
2. Pesmi s Triglava (1986) (ZKP RTV Ljubljana)
3. Cirkus (1987) (ZKP RTV Ljubljana)
4. Za domovino z Agropopom naprej (1988) (ZKP RTV Ljubljana)
5. Pod svobodnim soncem (1989) (ZKP RTV Slovenija)
6. V imenu ljudstva (1989) (ZKP RTV Slovenija)
7. Misliš, da sem seksi? (1991) (ZKP RTV Slovenija)
8. Lepo je bit Slovenc! (1993) (ZKP RTV Slovenija)
9. Z nami je Slovenija (1993) (ZKP RTV Slovenija)
10. Gremo na žur (1994) (ZKP RTV Slovenija)
11. Kič (1995) (ZKP RTV Slovenija)
12. Dobra tička (1996) (ZKP RTV Slovenija)
13. Srečni smo Slovenčki (1997) (ZKP RTV Slovenija)
14. Pleše kolo vsa Slovenija (1998) (ZKP RTV Slovenija)
15. Ko prašiči obmolknejo (1999) (ZKP RTV Slovenija)
16. Skupaj se veselimo (2010) (live) (Sedvex)
