= U magnovenju =

Studio album by Goblini
- Released: 1996
- Genre: Punk rock
- Length: 37:19
- Label: ITMM; One Records (reissue)
- Producer: Aleksandar Radosavljević

Goblini chronology
KST Live 31.08.'95 (1995)	U magnovenju (1996)	Turneja u magnovenju 96/97 (1998)

U magnovenju (In a long intuitive flash) is the third studio album by the Serbian punk rock band Goblini, released by Metropolis Records in 1996. The album was available on compact cassette only, until it was rereleased with the debut album on the compilation album Istinite priče + Goblini in 1998. The album was re-released by One Records in 2002.

== Track listing ==
No.	Title	Length
1.	"U magnovenju" (In a long intuitive flash)	3:29
2.	"Bolje soko u ruci nego guska u krevetu" (Better a falcon in hand than a goose in bed)	2:20
3.	"Vođa" (The leader)	3:01
4.	"On je ona je" (It's him it's her)	2:59
5.	"Ima nas!" (There's a lot of us)	4:13
6.	"Petra" (Petra)	3:03
7.	"Ona" (She)	3:07
8.	"P 5" (P5)	2:32
9.	"Privatni rat" (Private war)	3:54
10.	"On" (He)	3:17
11.	"Anja, volim te" (Anja, I love you)	2:55
12.	"Kraj" (The end)	2:29

== Personnel ==
- Vlada Kokotović — bass, backing vocals
- Zoran Jević "Fric" — drums
- Alen Jovanović — guitar, backing vocals
- Leo Fon Punkerstain — guitar, backing vocals
- Branko Golubović "Golub" — vocals
- Aleksandar Radosavljević — producer
