= Anja Rupel =

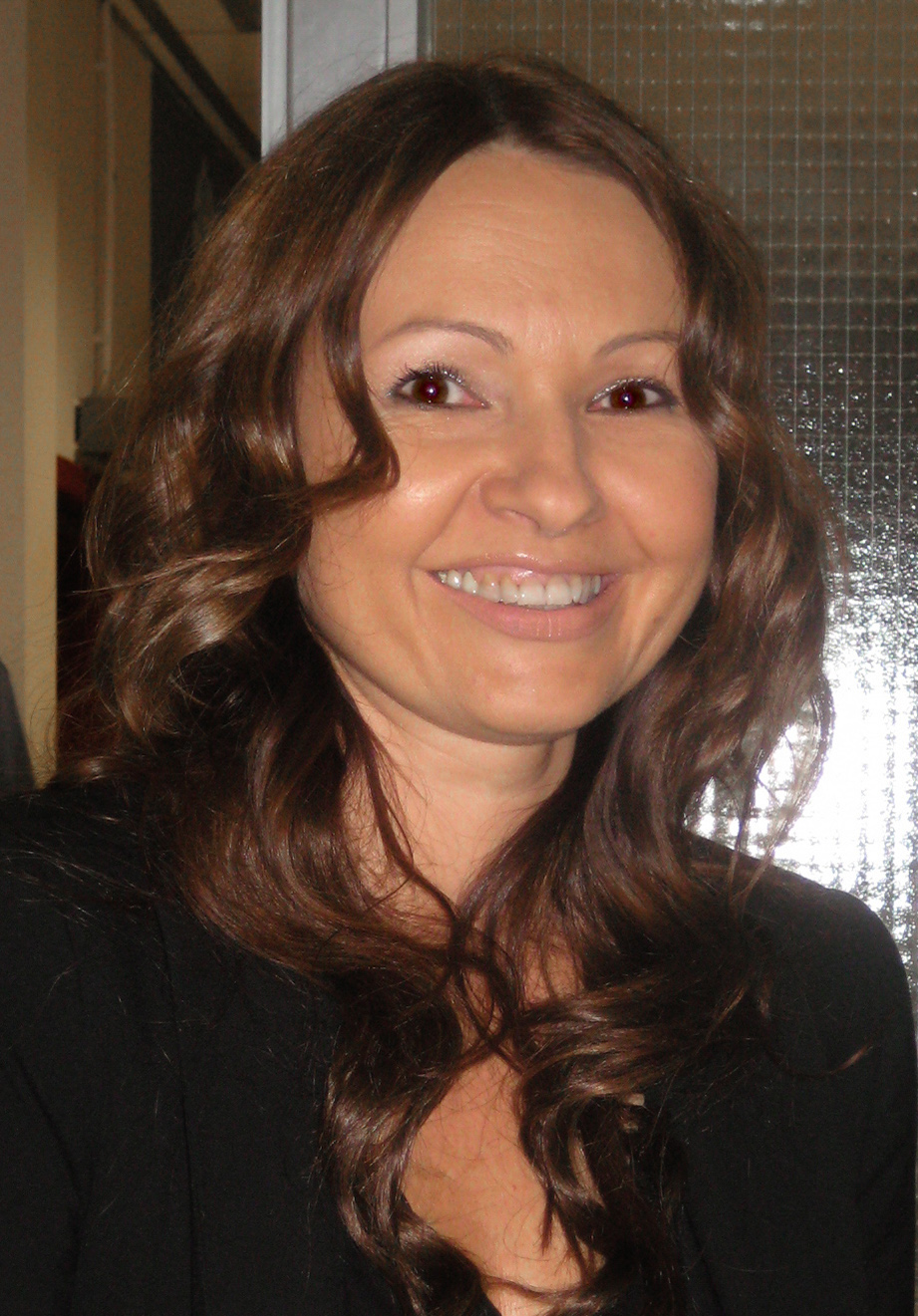

Background information
- Born: 19 March 1966 (age 60); SR Slovenia, SFR Yugoslavia
- Origin: Ljubljana, SR Slovenia, SFR Yugoslavia
- Instrument: vocals
- Years active: 1982––present
- Formerly of: Videosex, Laibach

Anja Rupel (born 19 March 1966) is a Slovene pop singer, songwriter, radio announcer, and journalist. Her father, Fedja Rupel, is a flautist and a professor at the Academy of Music in Ljubljana, and her uncle is the politician and diplomat Dimitrij Rupel.

Rupel has been involved in music since childhood. She played the flute for over ten years. In 1982, she began to perform as lead vocalist with the prominent synthpop group Videosex, which became very popular in the former Yugoslavia. The group recorded four albums. Their debut album, Videosex 84 appeared in 1983 and they played with bands such as Ekatarina Velika and Otroci Socializma in Belgrade. The group broke up in 1992.

Rupel then went on to her solo career and, in 1994 she recorded her first album Odpri oči (Open Your Eyes). For a while, she performed with the internationally prominent industrial/techno group Laibach from Trbovlje, Slovenia. In 1988, she sang The Beatles' anthem, Across the Universe and was the first Slovene to be featured on MTV. She is now recording new album in cooperation with the Slovene musician Rudi Štigel.

She also performed in the 1987 film Hudodelci (The Felons) directed by Franci Slak, and in several other films.

On 11 October 2002, she gave birth to a daughter named Luna. She is with a musician and singer Aleš Klinar who was a leader of a folk-pop group Agropop.

== Discography ==
=== With Videosex ===
- Videosex '84 (1983)
- Lacrimae Christi (1985)
- Svet je zopet mlad (1987)
- Arhiv (compilation) (1997)
- Ljubi in sovraži

=== Solo ===
- Odpri oči ("Open your eyes") (1994)
- Življenje je kot igra ("Life is like a game")
- Moje sanje ("My dreams")
- Ne ustavi me nihče ("Nobody stops me")
