= Rebel Star =

- Also known as: RebelStar, Rebelstar
- Origin: Bečej, Serbia / Szentendre, Hungary
- Genres: Alternative country, alternative rock, indie rock, pop rock, power pop
- Years active: 2006 – present
- Labels: Label Star, Slušaj Najglasnije!, Odličan Hrčak, Dancing Bear
- Members: Milan Glavaški; Zvonka Obajdin; Daniel Rodik; Ernest Džananović; Željko Markuš; Goran Ritoša
- Past members: Boris Smoje; Ljubomir Rajić; Goran Obradović; Ashley Breese; Attila Prikler; Mike Kentish
- Website: www.rebelstar-music.com

Rebel Star is an alternative country/pop rock band, formed in 2006 by the former Eva Braun and Popcycle member Milan Glavaški with musicians from Bečej, Serbia and Szentendre, Hungary, where he moved to live after the disbandment of Popcycle.

== History ==
=== 2000s ===
Rebel Star was formed in 2006 by Milan Glavaški, a former Popcycle and Eva Braun member, whom, having moved to Hungary, decided to resume his musical career. During the Summer 2006, at the Vrbas studio Kombinat Record, owned by the Veliki Prezir members Vladimir Kolarić "Kole" and Robert Telčer, with a lineup of musicians from which only the Hungarian drummer Attila Prikler and the Bečej bands Mizu and Superstudio guitarist Boris Smoje remained in the band, Glavaški recorded a promotional EP. The following year, the three were joined by Glavaški former bandmates from Popcycle, Ljubomir Rajić (keyboards) and Goran Obradović "Garwood Pickjon" (bass guitar, harmonica).

The band had their debut live appearance on March 25 of the same year at the Bečej club Scena, performing both as an opening act for Ken Stringfellow as well as being Stringfellow's backing band during the performance of his solo material and the songs he recorded with Big Star and The Posies. They also performed the song "Dream All Day" which Popcycle covered during the 1990s with lyrics in Serbian language entitled "Sanjam ceo dan" ("I Dream All Day"). On May 4 of the same year, at the Rebel Star performance in Bečej also appeared the reunited the original lineups of Popcycle and Eva Braun. During May, the band released the promotional EP in both CD format as well as in mp3 format for free digital download on the band's official website. The following month the song "Luna" from the EP appeared on the first place on the webzine Popboks domestic singles top list.

Having received positive reactions to the EP as well as their live appearances, the band decided to record a studio album. The album recording, with the working title Staklo (Glass) started in September at the Glavaški's studio in Szentendre, Hungary and continued in October in Cincinnati, United States. The debut album So (Salt) was released on December 20 of the same year, available for free digital download via the band's online record label Label Star, as well as on CD with three bonus tracks, a promotional video for the song "Staklo" ("Glass"), a PDF booklet and band photographs. The label also released a 7-inch single for the song "Staklo", with the song "Put" ("The Road") as the B-side, and both the single and the CD were released in Croatia through the Slušaj Najglasnije! independent record label. The album received mostly positive critics, being selected as the fourth best album of the year 2007 according to the critics of the Serbian webzine Popboks.

On January 4, 2008, the band had an unplugged appearance at the Radio B92 show Stand By. In February, the band started a live promotion of the material, performing in Novi Sad, and in March the band performed in Belgrade with guest appearance by Daniel Kovač (of Jarboli and Jesenji Orkestar), Željko Markuš (of Kristali), Nenad Jovanović (of Lutke), Ivana Smolović (Ika), and Vladimir Kolarić (of Veliki Prezir). at the beginning of 2009, the single "Amerika" ("America") was selected by Popboks as the sixth best domestic single of the year 2008. In March of the same year, the band performed in Zagreb, and in September they started recording their second studio album Kalifonija (Calliphonia), released on December 15, 2009. The album, released by both Label Star online label and the Odličan Hrčak independent record label, was well received by the critics in Serbia and Croatia.

=== 2010s ===
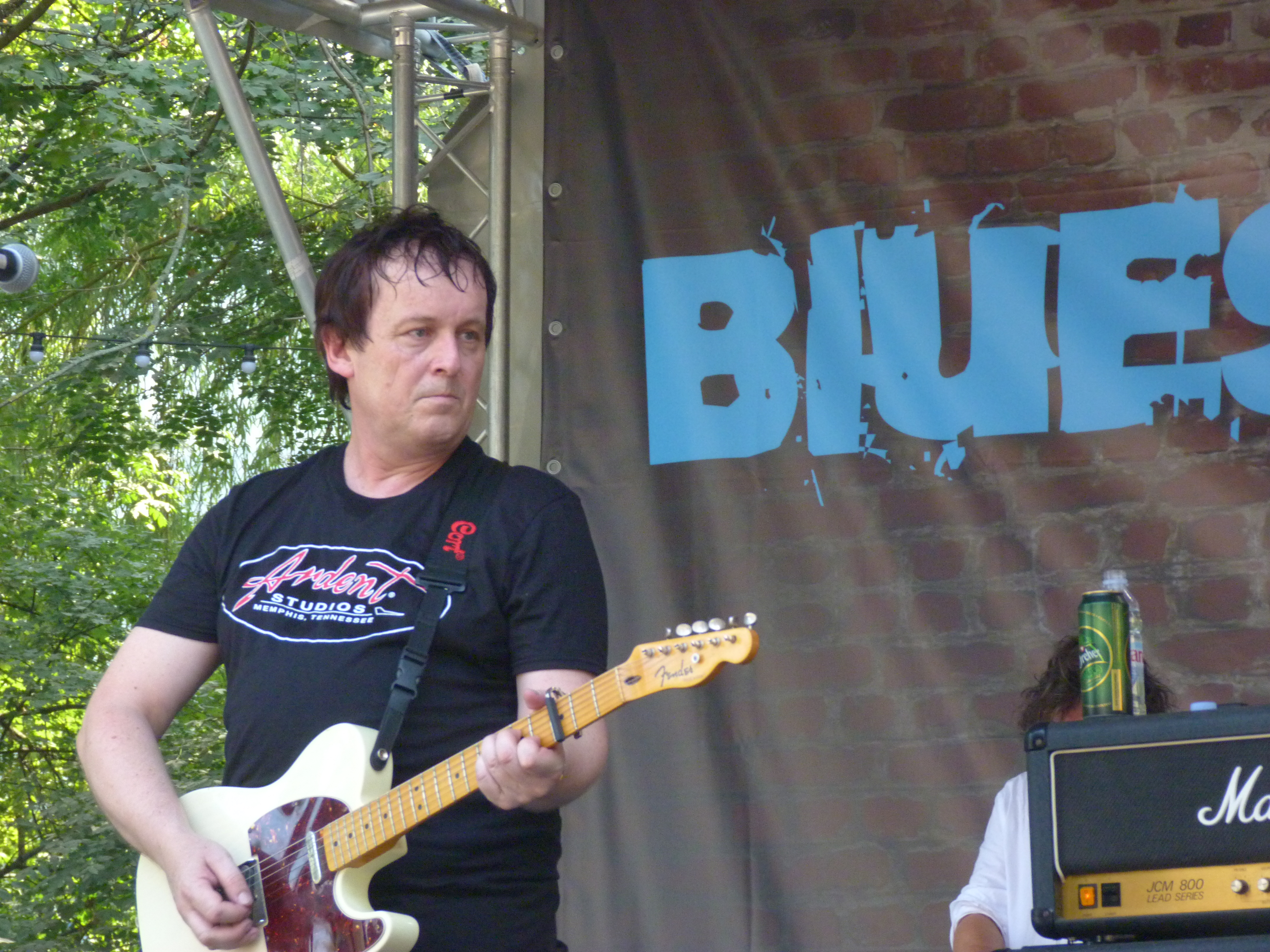
Ashley Brees performing with Rebel Star on the 2015 Sziget Festival

\\After the album release, the band started a live promotion of the album, performing in Belgrade during December 2009, and Novi Sad in January 2010. In February 2010, Kalifonija appeared on the twelfth place of the webzine Popboks best domestics album list of the year 2009. The following year, Popboks critics selected the best studio albums of the previous decade on which So appeared on the eleventh place. On October 16 of the same year, Kalifonija became available for free digital download at the official Rebel Star website.

During late 2011 and early 2012, the band had several performances in Belgrade, Zagreb and Novi Sad as a duo. In April 2012, two British musicians living in Budapest, Ashley Brees (guitar, keyboards, backing vocals) and Mike Kentish (bass guitar, backing vocals), joined the band permanently. Rebel Star had their first performance in the new line-up in Budapest on May 26.

The band's third album was released on October 1, 2012, through Croatian record label Dancing Bear. The album featured ten tracks and was entitled Rebel Star The first single from the album, "Anđeli" ("Angles"), was released at the beginning July for free download from the websites net.hr, muzika.hr and popboks.com. The song was recorded in collaboration with Ivana Smolović, member of Serbian bands Ika, Intruder and On Tour. In October 2013, the band released the single "Draga" ("Darling"), alongside a corresponding video directed by Glavaški. The song, which announces Rebel Star's fourth studio album, was available for free download from the band's official SoundCloud page.

The band's fourth studio album, entitled Reka (River), was released in June 2015. In August of the same year, the band performed on the Blues-Irish stage of Sziget Festival. In 2026 Rebel Star announced its last concert and held it Belgrade's Elelektropionir club.

In 2021, Milan Glavaški decided to record new album and partnered with several well known musicians from Zagreb. This group of musicians and friends produced two latest releases - Početak i kraj in 2021 and Sedmo nebo in 2023. Rebel Star today is an international band of collaborators, "tribe in which everyone matters", a community through which twenty musicians from seven countries have passed. In the new and most luxurious line-up so far, from 2022, Rebel Star is presented by six-member band stationed in Zagreb composed of excellent Croatian and Serbian musicians: Zvonka Obajdin (Svemir, North-West) on keyboards, Daniel Rodik on guitar and lap steel (Svemir, Undo, Skaramuži), Ernest Džananović on drums (Kristali, Presing, Bitipatibi), Željko Markuš on guitar (Kristali, Pacifik), Goran Ritoša on bass and Milan Glavaški on vocals and guitar (Eva Braun, Popcycle, Rebel Star). The band has a complex production and manages to maintain the integrity of a top gig while going through rock, Americana and indie genres in one dynamic set.

== Discography ==
=== Studio albums ===
- So (2007)
- Kalifonija (2009)
- Rebel Star (2012)
- Reka (2015)
- Demoni (2020)
- Početak i kraj (2021)
- Sedmo nebo (2023)

=== Extended plays ===
- Rebel Star Promo EP (2007)

=== Singles ===
- "Staklo" (2007)
- "More" (2009)
- "Andjeli" (2012)
- "Dah" (2012)
- "Početak i kraj" (2021)
- “Puste navike” (2022)
- "Mesec"(2023)
- "Ponoć"(2023)
