= Dža ili Bu =

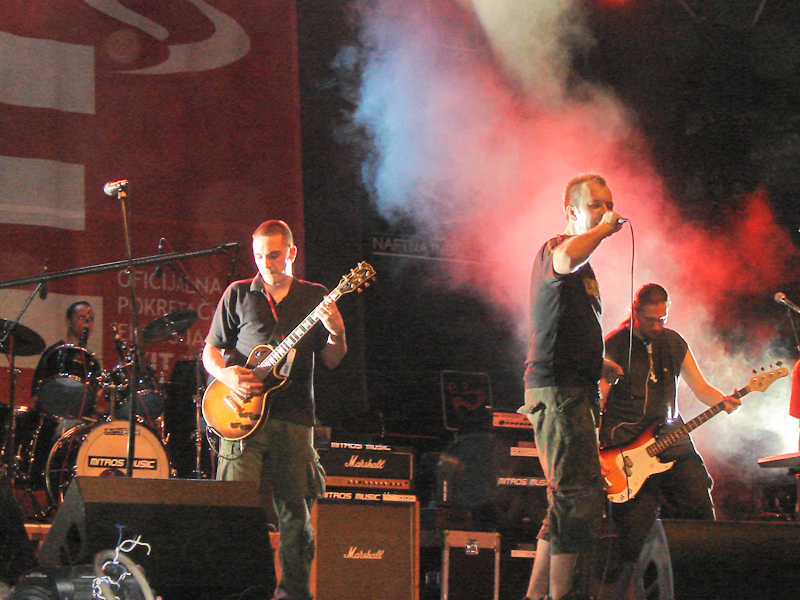
- Dža ili Bu performing at the 2007 Exit Festival

Background information
- Also known as: VIS Dža ili Bu
- Origin: Belgrade, Serbia
- Genres: Punk rock; alternative rock; hard rock; nu metal; industrial music
- Years active: 1987–1999; 2003–present
- Labels: Dellirium, Carlo Records, Metropolis Records, ZMEX, Fabrika, PGP-RTS, Multimedia Records, Mascom Records
- Members: Nebojša Simeunović; Dejan Milojević; Aleksandar Mitanovski; Vuk Pavlović; Vladan Vasiljević
- Past members: Duško Milojević; Stojan Radičević; Goran Majkić; Igor Panić; Vladimir Markoš; Stevan Đorđević
- Website: dzailibu.net

Dža ili Bu (Serbian Cyrillic: Џа или Бу, Serbian language expression for to be, or not to be) are a Serbian punk/alternative rock band formed in Belgrade in 1987. The band was one of the most prominent acts of the 1990s and 2000s Serbian rock scene. Dža ili Bu initially performed punk rock, but during the years incorporated elements of other genres into their sound, maintaining politically and socially provocative lyrical style throughout their whole career.

== History ==
=== 1987–1999 ===
The band was officially formed on 1 May 1987 by rhythm guitarist Nebojša Simeunović "Sabljar", bassist Duško Milojević, drummer Dejan Milojević and guitarist and vocalist Stojan Radičević. Simeunović spent his childhood in Libya and got the nickname "Sabljar" ("Sabre-man") from his father's hobby, sabre collecting. Prior to Dža ili Bu, he performed with the punk rock band Unbelievable Disgusting.

Dža ili Bu had their first live appearance at the Rex cinema, on 22 January 1988. During the same year, the band recorded a two-song demo, featuring the tracks "Mamin nov usisivač" ("Mama's New Vacuum Cleaner") and "Crveno" ("Red"). By the end of 1988, Radičević had already left the band, forming the band Prizori Sa Venčanja (Images from a Wedding) with Darkwood Dub member Milorad Ristić "Miki" and Presing member Vladimir Marković "Kraka". Simeunović then switched to vocals and the band got the temporary guitarist, Vera Kvark member Aleksandar Mitanovski, and, in October 1989, Goran Majkić became the full-time guitar player for the band. During the same year, the band had four of their songs released on the Drugi talas – Beograd '89 (The Second Wave – Belgrade '89) various artists compilation.

In 1990, the band recorded new material, releasing it at the beginning of 1991 on the compact cassette Lepa kaseta (A Nice Cassette) through independent record label Dellirium, and played across SFR Yugoslavia. Part of the songs from Lepa kaseta, with several other recordings, appeared on the band's official first album Hej mornari (Hey Sailors), released in March 1992 by Carlo Records. The A-side of the album was entitled Prokleti Harold (Damned Harold), and the B-side was entitled Nevidljiva ribizla (The Invisible Currant). With the witty sticker "Pobednici Splita '91" ("Winners of the 1991 Split Festival") on the album cover, the album presented the band's guitar-driven songs with social and ironic lyrics, like "Živeo Staljin i svetska revolucija" ("Long Live Stalin and the World Revolution"), "Kraljica pica parka" ("Pussy Park Queen") and "Pobeda i poraz" ("Victory and Defeat"). After the album release, the band started a promotional tour across Serbia. The band's frequent and effective live appearances, about a hundred of them in 1992, often featured cover versions of obscure songs, including "Lepi Mario" ("Pretty Mario") by Yugoslav punk rock musician Satan Panonski, which led to Index Radio pronouncing them the Live Act of the Year.

In 1993, the band released the album Spremanje ribljeg gulaša zahteva visoku koncentraciju (Preparing a Fisherman's Soup Takes High Concentration). Like on the previous album, the band had different titles for the album's A and B-side: the A-side was named Konj (Horse) and the B-side Pas (Dog). On the album, the band demonstrated various musical influences, including AC/DC, ZZ Top and Red Hot Chili Peppers, with the lyrics inspired by the fall of socialism, similar to the ones found on the debut album, in the songs like "Drug Tito se krije u pećini" ("Comrade Tito Is Hiding in a Cave"), "Velika svetska zavera" ("A Major World Conspiracy") and "Drugovi" ("Comrades"). The album also featured an ironic cover of the hit "Motori" ("Motorbikes") by Yugoslav heavy metal band Divlje Jagode. As guests on the album appeared Atheist Rap and Eva Braun members on backing vocals. After the album release, the band toured Serbia once again, and performed abroad for the first time, in Skopje.

In December 1995, the band released the CD Strašni sud (Judgement Day), which combined punk sound with cataclysmic lyrics. The songs "Zanimljiva geografija" ("Interesting Geography"), "Neki drugi grad" ("Some Other City"), "Uradi sam" ("Do It Yourself"), "Večna lovišta" ("Eternal Hunting Ground") and "Ustani i kreni" ("Stand Up and Go") were inspired by the political situation in the country, the latter two becoming hits. As bonus tracks appeared five songs from the previous releases. After the album release, in the summer of 1996, guitarist Goran Majkić left the band, first serving the Yugoslav army and then moving to the United States, where he got a master's degree at the NASA Center for Autonomous Control Engineering. With former Dead Kennedys and Butthole Surfers members, he formed the band God Dog. Igor Panić took his place in Dža ili Bu.

The new lineup recorded the album Kao da ničeg nije ni bilo (Like Nothing Ever Happened), produced by Igor Borojević, in late 1997. The album was recorded in the Fabrika (Factory) studio, started by the band and Borojević. On the album appeared the cover version of The Undertones single "Teenage Kicks", with lyrics in Serbian language and entitled "Pas koji hoda sam" ("A Dog that Walks Alone"). The cassette edition of the album was published by ZMEX in January 1998, and, nine months later, the band released the CD edition under their own label Fabrika. The CD edition included six of the band's promotional videos, the band biography and photos. In 1999, the band released the live album Live 1999 through the same record label.

In the spring of 1999, during the NATO bombing of Yugoslavia, the band ceased to exist. Simeunović formed the gothic/industrial band Chernobyl in House in April 1999, which released the album 12 in 2002 through Active-Time.

=== 2003–present ===
In 2003, the band was reformed in the lineup which, beside Simeunović, Milojević and Panić, featured keyboardist Stevan Đorđević and bass guitarist Vladimir Markoš. In 2005, the band released the best of compilation Retrovizor (Rear-View Mirror). Beside the selected songs from the band's career, the compilation also featured four live recordings, made at the band performance in the Belgrade Youth Center in January 1999, and new songs, "Ilegas" and "Opasne igre" ("Dangerous Games"), the latter being a cover of the song by Yugoslav synth-pop band Beograd.

In 2007, the band released their sixth studio album, Ultra muk (Ultra Silence). The album was recorded during 2006 and released by Multimedia Records. The album featured fifteen songs, including the cover version of Satan Panonski song "Lepi Mario", which the band often performed live, and the two new songs from Retrovizor. The bonus, enhanced CD, featured the band biography, discography and two music videos, for "Aljaska" ("Alaska") and "Ustani i kreni". The album brought a heavier sound, mainly influenced by industrial music and nu metal, especially in the politically inspired songs "Metak" ("Bullet"), "Rasprodaja" ("Sellout") and "Silikonska dolina" ("Silicon Valley"), and the rebellious "Alien" and "Zid" ("The Wall"). Having released the album, the band started promotional tour, playing at the major festivals in Serbia, like the Novi Sad Exit Festival and Nisomnia festival in Niš. The band also performed as an opening act for Kaiser Chiefs at the Belgrade Arena on 19 June 2007. On 9 November 2007, they celebrated their 20th anniversary with a concert in the Belgrade's Students' Cultural Center. The concert featured guest appearances by the former band members, vocalist Stojan Radičević, bassist and the current band manager Duško Milojević, guitarist Aleksandar Mitanovski, as well as Mravi member Saša Ivanović and Kanda, Kodža i Nebojša trumpet player Marko Petronijević. In 2009, the live version of the song "Sećam se" ("I Remember") appeared on Multimedia Records various artists live album Groovanje devedesete uživo (Grooving '90s Live).

The band celebrated their 25th anniversary with a live performance on the 2012 Vračar Rocks Festival, featuring guest appearance by the original bassist Duško Milojević, and with the release of the compilation album Dobre stvari (Good Stuff) for free download via MTV Serbia official website. The album featured 25 songs spanning the band's whole career, including three new songs and three rerecorded songs from the first album. In the autumn of the same year, the band was joined by another guitarist, Vladan Vasiljević "Vaske", while Markoš was replaced by Vuk Pavlović (formerly of Gangbangers).

In June 2013, the band released their seventh studio album, Kukovo leto (a Serbian language expression for never), through PGP-RTS. The album was recorded during 2011 and produced by Theodore Yanni. The album featured three songs from Hej mornari as bonus tracks. On 26 June 2014, the band performed, alongside Billy Idol, Psihomodo Pop and Tempera, at the Belgrade Calling Festival.

The band's eight studio album, Sedma sila (Seventh Force), was released in October 2016 through Mascom Records. The album was previously announced with three singles: a punk rock cover of Leo Martin's song "Odiseja" ("Odyssey"), released in November 2015, the new version of "Živeo Staljin i Svetska revolucija", released in February 2016, and "Diktatore" ("(Oh,) Dictator"), dedicated to Prime Minister of Serbia Aleksandar Vučić, released in April 2016. Sedma sila featured guest appearances by singer-songwriter Nikola Vranjković and Bjesovi frontman Zoran Marinković. After the album release, the guitarist Aleksandar Mitanovski returned to the band, replacing Panić. In March 2017, the cancellation of the band's concert in City Cultural Centre in Užice, scheduled for March 11, caused controversy in the Serbian public. Dejan Milojević stated for the media that the Center's management informed him the concert has to be cancelled because of technical problems, but that he and the rest of the band are convinced the real reason is the song "Diktatore".

In 2022, the band released their eighth studio album, Jasno i glasno (Loud and Clear), through their own label Fabrika. The album was recorded during 2018 in the Fabrika studio and originally planned to be released during 2019, but the release was postponed due to the outbreak of COVID-19 pandemic in Serbia. The album was announced by the single "Ja se smejem" ("I'm Laughing"), released in November 2019.

== Legacy ==
In 2021, the album Strašni sud was polled 60th on the list of 100 Best Serbian Albums Since the Breakup of SFR Yugoslavia. The list was published in the book Kako (ni)je propao rokenrol u Srbiji (How Rock 'n' Roll in Serbia (Didn't) Came to an End).

The lyrics of 7 songs by the band were featured in Petar Janjatović's book Pesme bratstva, detinjstva & potomstva: Antologija ex YU rok poezije 1967 - 2007 (Songs of Brotherhood, Childhood & Offspring: Anthology of Ex YU Rock Poetry 1967 – 2007).

== Discography ==
=== Studio albums ===
- Hej mornari (1992)
- Spremanje ribljeg gulaša zahteva visoku koncentraciju (1993)
- Strašni sud (1995)
- Kao da ničeg nije ni bilo (1998)
- Ultra muk (2007)
- Kukovo leto (2013)
- Sedma sila (2016)
- Jasno i glasno (2022)

=== Live albums ===
- Live 1999 (1999)

=== Compilation albums ===
- Lepa kaseta (1991) demo tapes
- Retrovizor (2005)
- Dobre stvari (2012)
- Retrovizor 1987-2012 (2013)

=== Singles ===
- "Ja se smejem" (2019)
- "Revolucija" (2019)

=== Other appearances ===
- "Pas" / "Prehrambena pesma" / "Novo breme" / "Smrdi buba" (Drugi talas – Beograd '89, 1989)
- "Ustani i Kreni / Live" (Nas slušaju svi, mi ne slušamo nikoga!, 1997)
- "Sećam se" (Groovanje devedesete uživo, 2009)
