= Veliki Prezir discography =

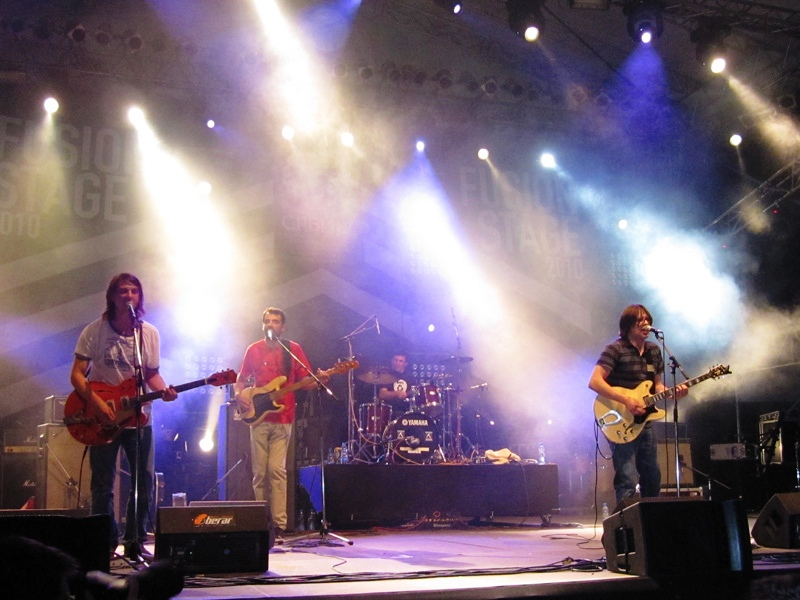
- Studio albums: 4
- Live albums: 1
- Singles: 1
- Music videos: 8
- Other appearances: 8

The discography of Veliki Prezir, a Serbian alternative rock band from Vrbas, consists of four studio album, one live album, one compilation album and eight various artists compilation appearances.

== Studio albums ==
| Year | Album details |
|---|---|
| 1996 | Velki prezir: Released: 1996; Label: Metropolis Records; Format: MC, CD |
| 2001 | Brazde: Released: 2001; Label: B92; Format: CD |
| 2005 | Ruka bez povratka: Released: 2005; Label: B92; Format: CD |
| 2009 | Nikadjekraj: Released: 2009; Label: B92; Format: CD |

== Live albums ==
| Year | Album details |
|---|---|
| 2001 | 1 2 3 4: Released: 2001; Label: Automatik Records; Format: CD |

== EPs ==
| Year | Album details |
|---|---|
| 2012 | Svetlost i dim: Released: December 2012; Label: Odličan hrčak; Format: EP |

== Singles ==
| Year | Album details |
|---|---|
| 2011 | "To": Released: March 9, 2011; Label: Format: MP3 |

== Music videos ==
| Title | Album / single | Released |
|---|---|---|
| "Samo tebe znam" | Velki prezir | 1996 |
| "Ne znam" | Veliki prezir | 1996 |
| "Moram da znam" | Brazde | 2001 |
| "Danima" | Brazde | 2001 |
| "Konj" | Ruka bez povratka | 2005 |
| "Suncokreti" | Ruka bez povratka | 2005 |
| "No no" | Nikadjekraj | 2009 |
| "Svi se spustite na pod" | Nikadjekraj | 2009 |

== Other appearances ==
| Title | Album / single | Released |
|---|---|---|
| "Samo tebe znam" | Velki prezir | 1996 |
| "Ne znam" | Veliki prezir | 1996 |
| "Moram da znam" | Ustani i kreni; | 1996 |
| "Okean" | Korak napred 2 koraka nazad | 1999 |
| "Samo tebe znam" "Između" | Recordings | 1999 |
| "Neobična sumnja" | Apsolutnih sto | 2001 |
| "Dobro je" | Metropolis vol.1 | 2001 |
| "Ne pričam o sebi" | "8 godina" (with Autopark) | 2005 |
| "Moram da znam" | Sigurno najbolji | 2006 |
