= Presing =

Serbian band

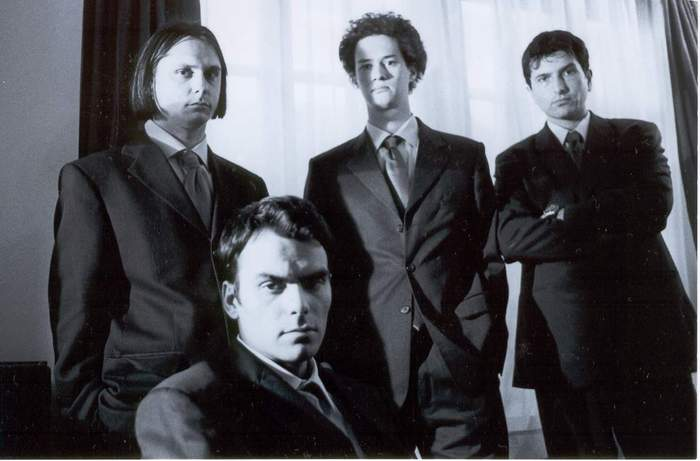
- Presing in 2001, from left to right: Dejan Utvar, Zoran Radović, Vladislav Rac and Vladimir Marković

Background information
- Also known as: Pressing
- Origin: Belgrade, Serbia
- Genres: Alternative rock, post-rock, art rock, indie rock, experimental music
- Years active: 1990 – 1993; 1996 – 2007; 2011 – present
- Labels: Nova Aleksandrija, Red Luna Records, B92, Favi, Square, Sensart, Beograund, Ammonite Records, Geenger Records
- Members: Vlada Marković; Zoran Radović; Dušan Petrović; Miloš Knežević; Aleksandar Jovan Krstić
- Past members: Blaža Drecun; Damjan Dašić; Dejan Utvar; Jovan Petrović; Marko Grubačić; Miladin Radivojević; Nikola Rađenović; Roman Goršek; Rudolf Cibulski; Saša Bugarčić; Vlada Marković; Vladislav Rac; Dušan Zdravković; Slobodan Asanović; Ernest Džananović
- Website: Official website

Presing is a Serbian alternative rock band from Belgrade. Formed in 1990 and named after pressure defense in basketball (and some other team sports), Presing were, together with Darkwood Dub and Kanda, Kodža i Nebojša, representatives of the so-called NeoBeo sound, alternative, guitar-based rock music produced in Belgrade in the early 1990s. New York Press wrote about Presing: "It's a sound that kicks the pants off the recycle-rock of The Strokes, The Vines and the White Stripes, just to name a few... You can hear bits of the melodic era of The Fall (This Nation's Saving Grace through Frenz Experiment), some Nick Cave, some Neil Young–and even some P-Funk via Kraftwerk".

The original lineup consisted of Zoran Radović "Kiza" on vocals, Vladimir Marković "Kraka" on guitar, Roman Goršek on bass guitar and Slobodan Asanović on drums. Radović and Marković remained in the band continuously, while other members kept changing. Highly artistic lyrics of Radović, performed in a rap manner, merged with harmonic and somewhat dissonant guitar tunes of Marković, thus creating a style of post-rock sound. Presing members are also involved in other art forms, such as fiction and poetry (both Radović and Marković released their books), painting and sculpture (Radović and Grubačić). They also have musical side projects such as Tron and Stereo Ikar by Radović and Tornado Ptice and Xanax by Marković.

== History ==
=== Formation and first breakup (1990–1993) ===
The band was formed in 1990, in the lineup consisting of former Pasmaters member Zoran Radović "Kiza" (vocals, bass guitar), Vladimir Marković "Kraka" (guitar) and drummer Slobodan Asanović "Boban". Before joining the band, Marković lived in London, working as a window-washer and bassist in a reggae band, but returned to Belgrade on Radović request of joining the band. Soon after, Radović quit playing bass, with former Euforija member Roman Goršek taking over the bass duties. The lineup had their first recordings, the songs "Mačo" ("Macho") and "Oboye" ("Both") released on the various artists compilation Želim jahati do ekstaze, released by Slušaj Najglasnije and Nova Aleksandrija record labels, which, due to the outbreak of the Yugoslav wars, did not have a proper distribution.

The outbreak of the war forced the band members to leave the country and for a while bassist Nikola Rađenović, a former Gastrbajters and Avtomobili member, and drummer Blaža Drecun, a former Darkwood Dub member, were replacements. On Goršek's return, the band, with the new drummer Miladin Radivojević, a former Klajberi member, recorded their debut album Priča o totemu, duhu koji hoda, psu i razočaranoj ženi (The Story of Totem, a Ghost that Walks, a Dog and a Disappointed Woman), featuring elements of punk rock, funk and noise music. The album, available on compact cassette only, was released by Slušaj Najglasnije record label in Croatia, and a slightly altered version of the album was released in Serbia by Sorabia Disk. It reached the second Yugoslav album of the year by both the magazine Ritam and the Italian Udine Radio.

After the album release, the band performed at the Zaječar Gitarijada festival, after which Goršek and Radivojević left the band, forming Plejboj, being replaced by the former Kazna Za Uši bassist Rudolf Cibulski and former Sport i Reinkarnacija drummer Saša Bugarčić. The new lineup also started recording new material, but due to Radović's health problems only two tracks were recorded, the song "Mamutska brda" ("The Mammoth Hills") and the instrumental "Godzila" ("Godzilla"), the former being released in 1994 on the various artists compilation Radio Utopia (B92: 1989-1994). "Mamutska brda" also appeared on the Geto (Ghetto) movie soundtrack, however it was never released officially. During the same year, the tracks "Mačo", "Šurikeni" ("Sure-cans"), "Sve zvezde" ("All the Stars"), and "Ona vreba" ("She is Lurk"), appeared on the split album 3, also featuring Overdose and Kazna Za Uši.

=== Re-formation (1993–2007) ===
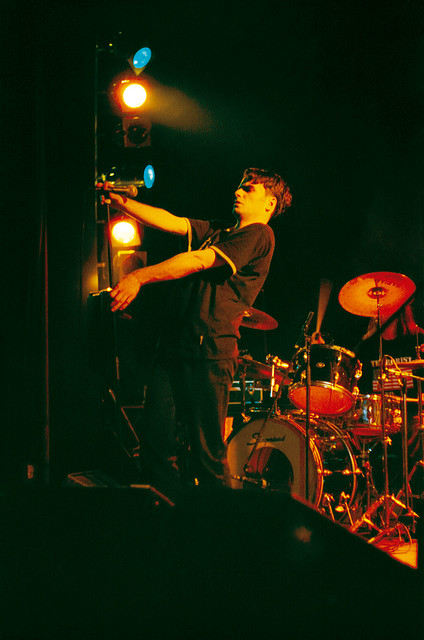
Zoran Radović "Kiza" performing live with Presing in 2002

The band had a three-year break in its career, during which Marković formed the band Tornado Ptice, also featuring Vladislav Rac (of Kanda, Kodža i Nebojša) on bass guitar, Ognjenka Lakićević (later Autopark vocalist) on vocals, Predrag Ilić on drums, Nenad Pejović on the other guitar, Nebojša Mrđenović on cello and violinist Vladimir Nikolić, releasing the album Prozračno poslepodne (An airy afternoon) on Automatic Records. With the former Kanda, Kodža i Nebojša bassist Vladislav Rac and drummer Miladin Radivojević, Radović and Marković re-formed Presing in 1996. Two years later, the song "Mačo" appeared on the soundtrack for the Radivoje Andrić movie 3 palme za 2 bitange i ribicu (3 Palm-Trees for 2 Punks and a Chick).

In 2001, the lineup changed and drummer Radivojević was replaced by Dejan Utvar, a former Kanda, Kodža i Nebojša and Kazna Za Uši drummer. The following year, on June 12, the second studio album 600 nebo (pun for 6th heaven) was released, recorded during May and June 1999 and produced by Željko Božić. The album was critically acclaimed and it reached No. 1 on the lists of best albums of the year 2002 in FR Yugoslavia by pop culture monthly OK magazin, Blic daily and Reporter weekly, and the US weekly magazine Boston Phoenix ranked the album as "one of the best five albums to emerge from Europe in the past decade". The sound of the band on this album evolved towards more harmonic structures of soul, free jazz, country and even krautrock. The single "Ritam u kojem stojiš" ("Rhythm that You're Standing In") reached No. 1 in video charts of Radio Television of Serbia 3rd Channel, TV Studio B and No. 2 in the lists of best music videos of the year 2002 by TV B92 and Music Television of Serbia.

In 2003 the debut album, Priča o totemu, duhu koji hoda, psu i razočaranoj ženi, was rereleased on CD by Sensart and Beograund independent record labels. The following year, a former Trenje bassist Marko Grubačić "Gega", and E-Play drummer Damjan Dašić became the new band members, immediately starting a year and a half long recording sessions at the Master Blaster and Vesa studios for the third studio album, Zanos bez snova (Enchantment without Dreams), combining a more subtle sound, featuring increased use of string sections of tango and modern classical music, with loud and dissonant guitar sound. Guest appearances on the album featured Ivana Smolović (vocals), Dušan Petrović (saxophone), Milica Milojević (flute), Boris Krstajić (synthesizer), Marko Petronijević (trumpet, jaw harp) and Vladimir Nikolić (violin, viola).

On March 30, 2007, the band held a farewell concert at the Belgrade Youth Center, featuring guest appearances by Aleksandar Jovan Krstić on flute and Jarboli member Daniel Kovač on acoustic guitar. After the band disbandment, Radović released a solo album Arax and founded an electronic music duo Tron with the former Supernaut member Svetolik Trifunović "Trile". Marković with Sana Garić formed the supergroup Xanax, also featuring musicians from various Belgrade alternative bands.

=== Reunion (2011–present) ===
In December 2011, the band reunited in the lineup which beside Marković and Radović featured a new bassist Dušan Zdravković, an upright bass graduate at the Norvegian Stanvager Music Academy, and the drummer Ernest Džananović, a Kristali member. The band had their first reunion performance on December 29. In July 2013, the band released the compilation album Skrivena planeta - Najbolje od Presinga (Hidden Planet - The Best of Presing). The album, beside Presing's old songs, featured two new songs, "Zvona se uklapaju sa suncem" ("The Bells Are Matching with the Sun"), and "Robot čioda" ("Robot Pin"), the latter featuring Pavle Popov as guest, both of which would appear on the band's fourth studio album.

In November 2014, the band released their fourth studio album, Neurokrem (a word play, Eurokrem being a popular sweet milk chocolate spread). The band recorded the album in the new lineup, featuring Marković, Radović, Džananović on drums and bass guitarist Dušan Zdravković. Neurokrem was released in both digital format and on vinyl record. It was previously announced by the single "Mi nismo verni" ("We Are Not Faithful"), featuring Zoja Borovčanin of Lira Vega as guest, released in December 2013.

In June 2018, the band released the single "Labudov sneg" ("Swan's Snow"). The video for the song was directed by Marković and represented a tribute to John Boorman's 1974 film Zardoz. The single announced the band's fifth studio album "Povratak u krntiju".

== Legacy ==
The lyrics of the band's song "Podvig" ("Feat") were featured in Petar Janjatović's book Pesme bratstva, detinjstva & potomstva: Antologija ex YU rok poezije 1967 - 2007 (Songs of Brotherhood, Childhood & Offspring: Anthology of Ex YU Rock Poetry 1967 - 2007).

== Discography ==
=== Studio albums ===
- Priča o totemu, duhu koji hoda, psu i razočaranoj ženi (1992)
- 600 nebo (2002)
- Zanos bez snova (2006)
- Neurokrem (2014)
- Povratak u krntiju (2021)

=== Compilation albums ===
- 3 (1994) - split album, with Kazna Za Uši and Overdose
- Skrivena planeta - Najbolje od Presinga (2013)

=== Other appearances ===
- "Mačo" / "Oboye" (Želim jahati do ekstaze; 1991)
- "Mamutska brda" (Radio Utopia (B92: 1989-1994); 1994)
- "Mačo" (Muzika iz filma '3 Palme Za 2 Bitange i Ribicu; 1998)
