= Supernatural Festival =

Tourism in Serbia

Supernatural Festival

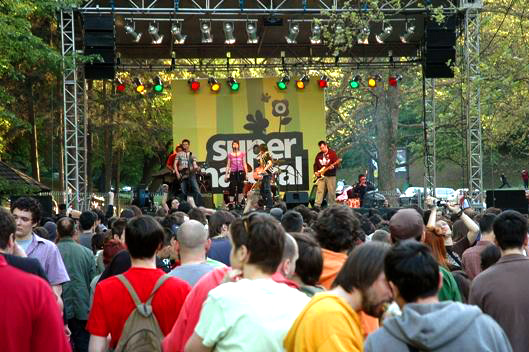
- Supernatural Festival in Nature]
- Dates: End of April
- Locations: Belgrade, Serbia
- Years active: 2007 - present
- Website: http://www.supernaturalfest.com/

The Supernatural Festival is an open-air ecology and music festival held annually in April. It is located at the park-forest Košutnjak, in Belgrade, the capital of Serbia.

The Supernatural Festival has the aim of raising ecological awareness about the importance of nature, ecology, natural ways of life and good behavior towards planet Earth. Apart from being a festival, it is also an ecological movement, utilizing art, media and events as means to promote ecology and educate people about how awareness of nature impacts humanity's survival.

The Festival celebrates the Day of The Planet Earth, 22 April. Every year, the festival takes place at Košutnjak, one of the most popular recreational places in Belgrade, located 6 km southwest from the city's downtown; the natural landscape lies just next to the national historic landmark Hajdučka Česma. This festival location provides space for 20,000 visitors. The festival takes place during daylight hours, to emphasize efficient use of energy. All of the festival stages use biodiesel fuel as their main power supply, and throughout the festival, visitors are encouraged to recycle their waste. The Supernatural Festival usually starts early in the morning, featuring children's programs that include workshops on human ecology, the environment and recycling techniques.

== History ==
Since 2007, the festival has grown into one of the most recognized ecology and music festivals in Serbia and the Balkans. What started as a meagerly attended gathering at Belgrade's natural resource of Košutnjak has transformed into a festival promoting not only domestic and foreign music but also healthy and energy efficient ways of life. In the opening year of 2007, over 5,000 visitors gathered at the Supernatural festival grounds, with several environmental organizations doing workshops and seminars about the importance of nature and recycling. A festival stage featured bands like: Obojeni Program, Shiroko, Belgrade Yard Sound System, Kinetic Vibe, and Goran Milošević. The following year, 2008, featured a children's program that started early in the morning, thus opening the festival to a younger audience, providing opportunities for younger people to learn more about environmental issues. In 2008, The Supernatural Festival featured two stages: A main stage that hosted live acts such as: Darkwood Dub, Petrol, Neočekivana Sila Koja Se Iznenada Pojavljuje i Rešava Stvar, Autopark, Vlada Janjić, Gordan Paunović, and a second, more electronics-oriented, stage "Disko Livada" (Disco Meadows) that hosted performers such as: DJ Flip, Tijana T, DJ Neca, and Zalutale sa Rejva.

== 2009 ==
On 26 April 2009, Supernatural Festival hosted some of the best rock, dub, reggae and alternative acts in Serbia, as well as one acclaimed foreign group. Also, over 20 ecological organizations were present at the festival with their own creative programs and workshops promoting environmental awareness.

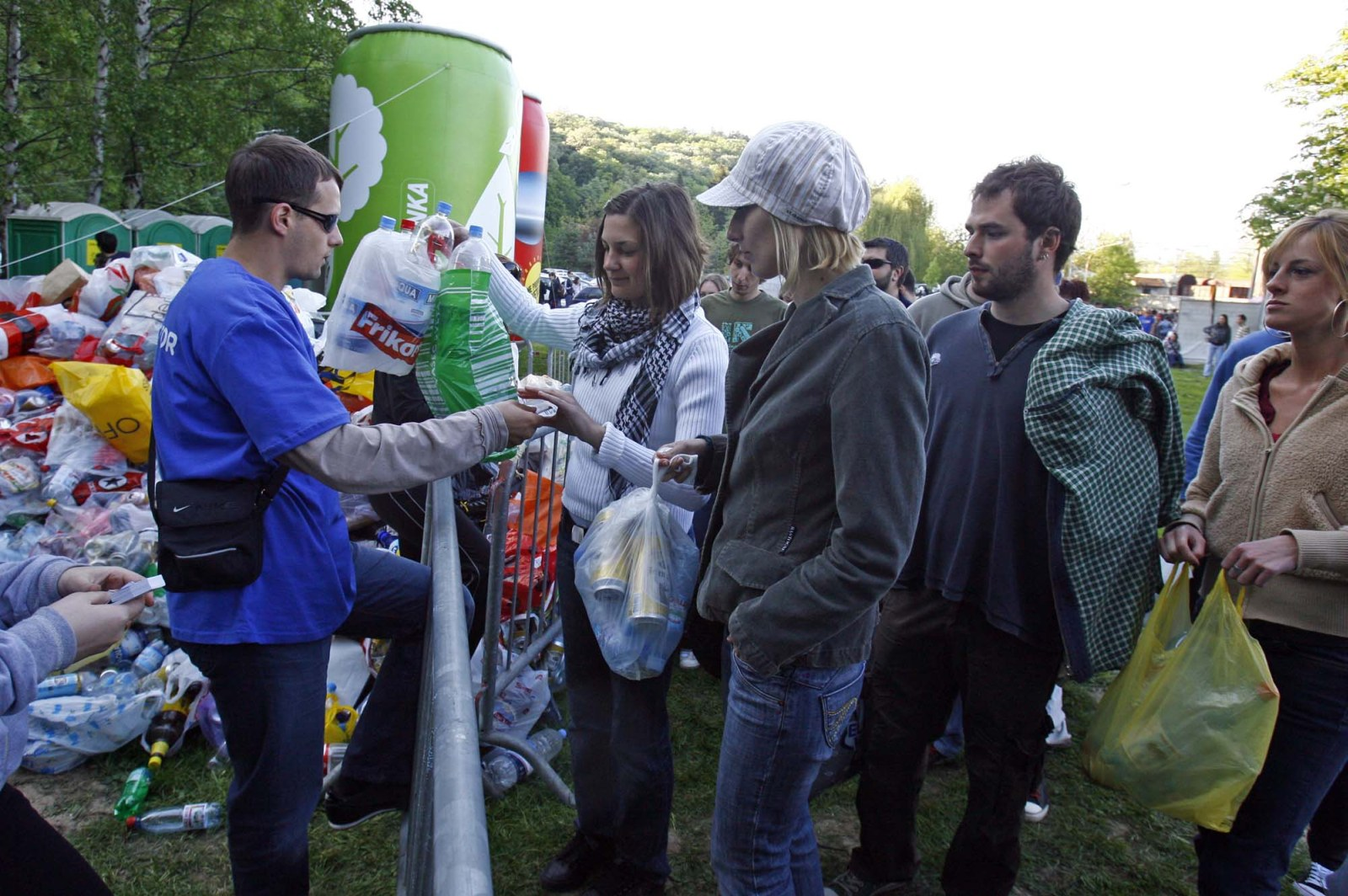
Supernatural Festival 2009. visitors recycling at the festival gates, since the entrance fee was three aluminum cans and plastic bottles recycled at the site.

The conditions to enter the festival were to bring three aluminum cans and three plastic bottles as well, and recycle them at the festival gates. The alternative way was to buy the ticket at the affordable price of 400RSD. Educational and music program for children started at 9AM offering them a chance to learn more about recycling and other environmental issues. The regular program started later that day with workshops covering the topic like recycling, waste management, renewable energy with practical demonstrations, nylon art and many more. The main stage, run entirely with biodiesel fuel, hosted the headliners for the Supernatural 2009. English group Dub Pistols. Following artists performed at main stage and "disko livada" that day: Rambo Amadeus, Eva Braun (band), Jarboli, Veliki Prezir, Shiroko, Vlada Janjić, Gordan Paunović, Banana Rave, Funky Šljiva, Indie Go!, Idemo na Mars, Leontina Vukomanovic, Bill Brewster, Irie FM, Miško Plavi, Tijana T, Braća Burazeri, DJ Peca, Dečiji hor "Čarolija" children choir and many more. Products such as organic food, wooden nest boxes and biodegradable carrying bags were available at the festival shop. Over 20,000 visitors gathered to support to bands and festival.

== 2010 ==
The 2010 Supernatural Festival was held on 25 April, at the traditional Košutnjak, Belgrade location, near the historic landmark Hajdučka Česma. Some of the most prominent regional organizations in the domains of ecology, natural environment and renewable energy participated in the Supernatural Festival, 2010. On November 7, 2009, The Supernatural Festival announced an open-call public competition for the most original architectural solution for festival pavilions. Each solution was to employ new, affordable, biodegradable materials, sustainable design and green technologies. Several workshops were to be held regarding the topic of green architecture.

== 2013 ==
The 7th Supernatural Festival was held on April 22, 2013. 7000 people were part of this event.

== 2016 ==
The 10th Supernatural Festival was held on April 23, 2016 at Košutnjak, Belgrade.

== 2017 ==
The 11th Supernatural Festival was held on April 23, 2017 at Ada Huja, an island on the Danube river.
