= Eva Braun (band) =

Band

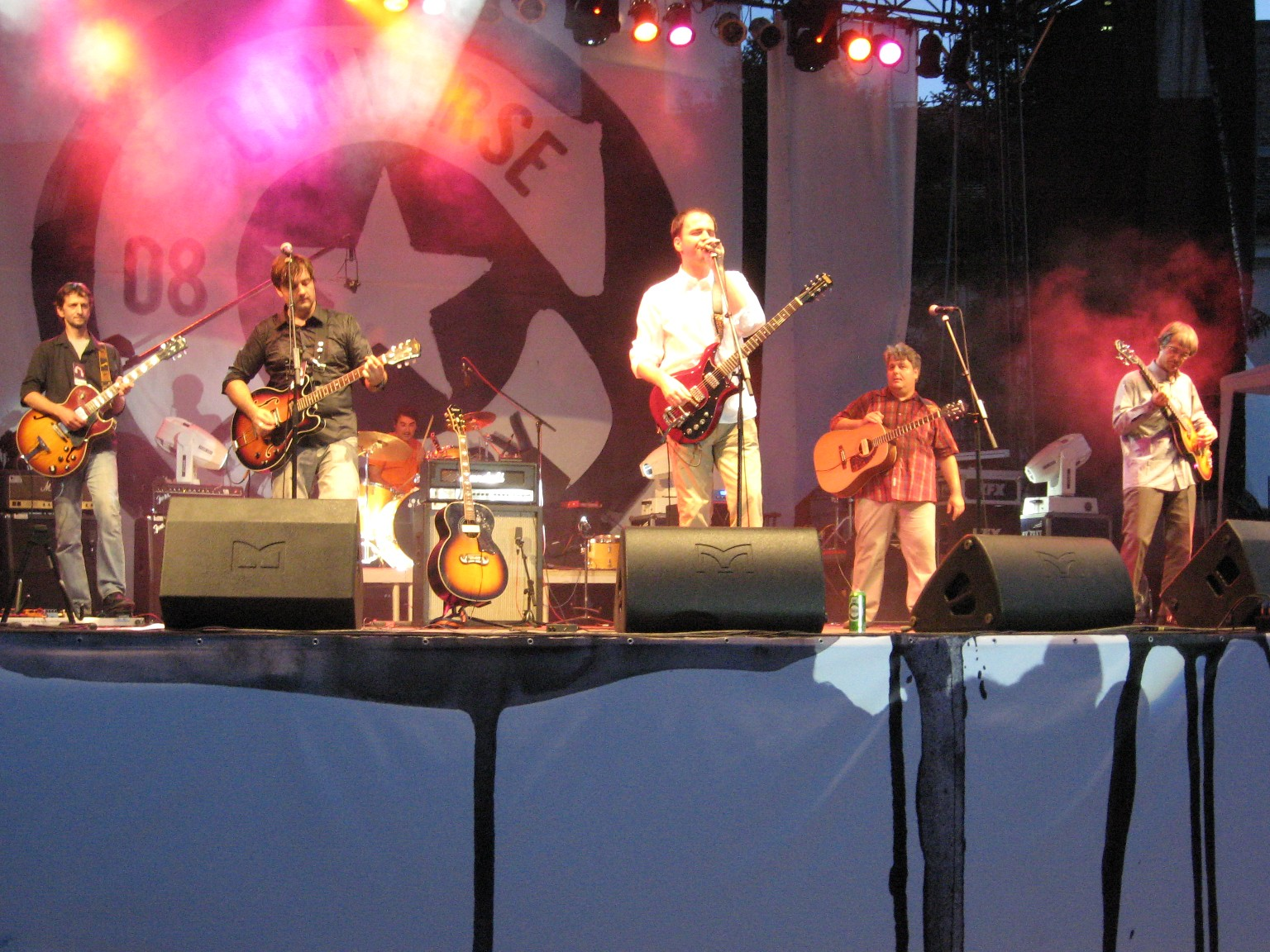
- Eva Braun at the 2008 EXIT festival; from left to right: Stojkov, Glavaški, Rajić, Vasović, Dolinka, Obradović

Background information
- Also known as: Viva Brown
- Origin: Bečej, Serbia
- Genres: Pop rock; britpop; power pop; baroque pop
- Years active: 1990–present
- Labels: Carlo; B92; Automatik; Lampshade; Midget Unit
- Members: Goran Vasović; Goran Obradović; Zvonko Stojkov; Albert Šeregelj; Damjan Dašić
- Past members: Dušan Ševarlić; Saša Džuklevski; Srđan Ljiljak; Petar Dolinka; Milan Glavaški; Goran Sadžakov; Ljubomir Rajić

Eva Braun (Serbian Cyrillic: Ева Браун) is a pop rock band from Bečej, Serbia, notable as one of the most important bands of the Vojvodina pop-rock scene of the 1990s. The band is credited for starting the pop rock revival in FR Yugoslavia of the 1990s which produced other notable acts like Oružjem Protivu Otmičara, Kristali and Veliki Prezir.

== History ==
=== Formation, debut releases (1989–1993) ===
In 1989, Goran Vasović and Petar Dolinka discussed the idea of forming a band. In Spring 1990, the core of the band was formed by the former two and Milan Glavaški. The agreement took place in a rented apartment in Novi Sad's Miše Dimitrijevića street. The first songs from this period were "Kuća lutaka", "Kao da znam", "Sva tvoja ćutanja" and "Dan pobede". In September, Ljubomir Rajić, after coming back from the army, joined the band as the fourth member. Naming the band after Eva Braun was proposed by Vasović after viewing a biographical film about Adolf Hitler. The name was both unusual and provocative, which was agreeable to the other members. The first rehearsals took place in November, and the first concert was held in the end of 1991 in a local "DB Klub" in Bečej. The band played both their own songs as well as cover versions of the Beatles, Little Richard, the Byrds, and Idoli songs. Most of 1991 was spent in composing the music that would appear on the debut album.

The debut album Prisluškivanja (Eavesdroppings) was recorded between February and April 1992 in the "Do Re Mi" studio in Bukovac near Novi Sad. The studio owner and album producer was Predrag Pejić Peđa, a friend of the band members since their beginnings. The recording lasted for about 130 hours on the 8 channel Magnetophon, using rhythm machine instead of drums. At the time of the recording, the band still had not gotten a label. But one of the guests of the "Do Re Mi" studio was Mića Jakšić, owner of the Carlo Records for which Belgrade's Dža ili Bu had just signed. After some negotiations, the agreement was made with him to release the album. On 5 October 1992, the debut album Prisluškivanja was released. Only 500 copies of vinyl LPs were printed.

Although the marketing campaign was rather chaotic and unprepared, the album was noticed by some influential people of the music industry, like Gordan Paunović, Momčilo Rajin, Petar Janjatović, Bojan Žikić, Nebojša Pajkić, Tomislav Grujić and Dinko Tucaković, who was the art director of the Museum of Yugoslav Film Archive. Radio B92 also played a great role in promoting Prisluškivanja. The rest of 1992 the band spent on promoting the album on the medias who were interested in pop and rock music. Eva Braun had no music videos in this period, so TV appearances were only in the form of interviews and lip-synch performances. Few songs from Prisluškivanja became minor hits such as "Već viđeno", "Ponekad", "Sva tvoja ćutanja", "Jagodna Polja" and "Kuća lutaka".

In January 1993, Mića Jakšić organized a tour called "Dobri bendovi Vojvodine" (Good Bands of Vojvodina) as a response to then heavily promoted tour "Brzi bendovi Srbije" (Fast Bands of Serbia). A few bands of very different music styles took part and, besides Eva Braun, those were Generacija Bez Budućnosti, 16x8x23, Gluve Kučke, Instant Karma, Oružjem Protivu Otmičara and others. Till the end of February, the tour had included all the major cities of Vojvodina, and the last concert was held in Belgrade's KST. The bands who took part in the tour also recorded a cover of the Clash song London Calling, under the title "Vojvodina zove" (Vojvodina Calling), but the song was never released.

Having finished the "Dobri Bendovi Vojvodine" tour, the band started working on the unplugged concert which was announced for mid-Spring 1993. With a help of Dinko Tucaković, the concert was held on 16 April 1993 in the Hall of the Yugoslav Film Archive. The crowd of 200 people enjoyed what is considered the best concert of the band's early career. The concert lasted for two and a half hours, with three encores. The band played own songs as well as some covers. The guests were Sabljar of Dža ili Bu and violinist Saša Štukelja. The whole performance was recorded and, about a month later, released as a live album Unplugged 16.04.1993. Today, the album is considered a rarity, as only 200 audio cassettes were released.

=== Nationwide success, breakup (1993–1996) ===
Until the end of the summer, Prisluškivanja was sold out, and Unplugged was heavily praised. Eva Braun slowly came to popularity. But, the things were not going easy for the band. In Autumn 1993, Carlo Records was closed. Gordan Paunović, the music editor of radio B92 approached the band and offered them to take part in the compilation album Radio Utopia, which was to be released for the occasion of the fifth anniversary of B92. The band chose to do a cover of The Velvet Underground's "Stephanie Says". The song was named "Aljaska" (Alaska), and became one of Eva Braun's greatest hits so far. After this success, the band signed for the new formed B92 record label. During the same year, they recorded two songs to the lyrics of the poet Ljubivoje Ršumović for the children TV show "Fore i fazoni" of TV Novi Sad, and soundtrack for the play Caligula by Albert Camus directed by Ana Miljanić. In the meantime, the band was working on their second studio album.

Recording the album Pop Music was very slow and difficult. It started in September 1994 in the "Do Re Mi" studio, which was now relocated to Novi Sad, and was going very slowly. The reasons were numerous: often power cuts, bad and old equipment, etc. The relations within the band were also not as harmonic any more. During the ten months of the recordings, the band members spent only four days together in the studio. The authorship of the album was shared between Vasović, Glavaški, Dolinka, and, for the first time, Ljubomir Rajić. The recording was finished in July 1995, and the album was released on 14 December 1995.

The album was promoted in Belgrade's "Plato" club, and one of the guests was Vlada Divljan of Idoli who had just come back from Australia where he lived for years. In February 1996 Eva Braun and Vlada Divljan recorded a cover version of "Hajde, sanjaj me sanjaj", originally released on the Idoli album Odbrana i poslednji dani. The music video for this song was directed by Dinko Tucaković. Pop Music was critically acclaimed, and had a large public interest. For the first time, the band had a real hit, the song "Sasvim običan dan". The other, minor hits were "Zmajevi", "25. Avgust" and "Sada ne znam gde sam ne znam šta". For all the songs Relja Mirković had directed the music videos, and on the videos for "Zmajevi" and "25. Avgust" (recorded on the same day), Petar Dolinka was absent. By that time he had already left the band, but came back later only to do few more concerts on the Pop Music tour.

Internal conflicts between Vasović and Glavaški were increasing, which soon came to the point of no return. This led to the end of the first line-up of Eva Braun. Although the atmosphere in the band was dark, the band's live performances were still appreciable. The best concerts from this tour were held in Belgrade's clubs REX and SKC and in Novi Sad's Dom Mladih. The concert in SKC held in July 1996 was actually the last concert of the original Eva Barun lineup. The members did not even talk to each other at this point. After the concert, Eva Braun disbanded.

=== Reformation, hiatus (1996–2001) ===
In Autumn 1996, the members of "Zajedno" coalition invited Goran Vasović to reform Eva Braun and take part in the coalition's final meeting before the 1996 local elections in Serbia. Vasović took the chance, and called Zvonko Stojkov and Srđan Ljiljak, guitarist and drummer of the local R&B band Specijalno Izdanje. The band was reformed after two days of rehearsals. The new Eva Braun lineup performed three songs at the political meeting in front of the crowd of 100,000 people. Dušan Ševarlić, the bassist of the Novi Sad's band Minstrelm joined Eva Braun a few weeks later.

In late 1996, Eva Braun signed for a new record label, Automatik Records from Belgrade. The reissue of Prisluškivanja was released with a bonus track "Hajde, sanjaj me sanjaj". In the meantime, the new line-up recorded two new songs at the "Drum" studio in Novi Bečej: "Zviždi Srbija" (Serbia Whistles, a cover of The Beach Boys' "Surfin' U.S.A.") and "Vrteška", composed by Vasović and Tomislav Grujić of B92. A music video for "Vrteška" was also made. This led to some attention of the media and a series of concerts was made in 1997 with a good reception. In just four months period, between February and May 1997, the new line-up held more concerts than the original one had done in their whole career.

As the new line-up showed good results, Goran Vasović decided to continue the band's activity. In the Summer of 1997, the band started to prepare their third studio album. The recording took place at the "M" studio in Novi Sad and "O" studio in Belgrade during the Winter and Spring. The producer was Mirko Vukomanović, who previously produced highly acclaimed album [BarbieCue by Zrenjanin band Oružjem Protivu Otmičara. Although he left the band, Petar Dolinka continued to write songs for Eva Braun together with Vasović. Two of them wrote all the songs for the new album except for one cover. The guests on the album were Aleksandra Kovač on the song "Santa Fe", actor Sergej Trifunović on the cover of Film's "Odvedi me iz ovog grada" and Tina Milivojević as a backing vocalist on "Mala prodavnica užasa" and "Ja to radim samo kad sam sam".

In the early June 1997, the single "Lavirint" was released accompanied by the two different music videos, directed by Aca Ilić, announcing the new album Heart Core. The album contained twelve songs of modern pop music, and is considered by Vasović to be the best album of the band's career. But, although the band expected Heart Core to be their magnum opus, the critical reception was mixed. The music video was filmed for the song "Mala prodavnica užasa", directed by Srdan Golubović. After the series of concerts, interviews and intensive promotion, the album found its way as one of the best selling albums of the year 1998 in FR Yugoslavia.

In 1998 Vasović, helped by Željko Rakočević Kole, a Serb from Los Angeles, succeeded to make Eva Braun part of the International Pop Overthrow festival in Los Angeles. Eva Braun's performance on the festival was well received, and the band gained the opportunity to record an album for the North American market. Having returned home, the band recorded The Nowhere Land in 1999, consisting mostly of the old Eva Braun songs with lyrics in English language. The lyrics adaptations were done by Goran Obradović of Popcycle. The band changed the name for the U.S. market to Viva Brown, which was felt to be more politically correct.

In 2000, Automatik Records released the compilation album First and Last, which consisted of twenty-two songs featuring the complete albums Prislučkivanja and The Nowhere Land and the singles "Hajde sanjaj me sanjaj" and "Vrteška". The music video for "Cabaret Noire" (originally from The Nowhere Land) was filmed. The band then played a concert in Belgrade's "Saund", accompanied by Saša "Džule" Džuklevski who became the band's fifth member. After few more concerts in Serbia, Eva Braun started the work on their most ambitious project so far, an album entitled Vremenske zone (Time Zones). Dolinka and Vasović approached this album as prominent. The album was later renamed Everest, which is the original title of The Beatles' Abbey Road. The album was released by B92 in 2001, a year after the work had started. The first single released was "Meg Ryan Blues" accompanied by a music video, directed by Academy Award-nominated director Stefan Arsenijević. After the album's release, the farewell concert was held in Belgrade's REX club, as Vasović decided to quit performing live. Eva Braun went on hiatus.

=== Original lineup reunion (2007–present) ===
After four years of inactivity, Eva Braun was reformed in 2007 in the original line-up (Vasović, Dolinka, Glavaški, Rajić), with the addition of Goran Obradović on bass guitar, and made a comeback concert in Bečej the same year. During 2008, Label Star released a compilation album Off the Record which contained unreleased and demo recordings from the 1997-2006 period. The album was available for free download on the record label official site. The album featured a new song, "Evergrin" ("Evergreen"), also released as a single, reaching the third position on the B92 annual chart for 2008. In the same year, the band made several well received concerts in Belgrade's SKC, at EXIT festival in Novi Sad and Nisomnia festival in Niš.

In 2008, the band started preparing a new studio album with the work title Nesanica (Insomnia). The album, retitled Playback, recorded at the Novi Sad Do-re-mi studio and produced by Peđa Pejić, would feature selected recordings from about thirty songs the band had recorded during the sessions for the album. On 28 June 2010, the first single "U izgnanstvu" became available for free download at the B92 records official site. On 3 February 2011, the band released yet another single for free download, the song "Okreni moj broj" ("Dial My Number"). In May, the band released the single "Istra" ("Istria") for free download through Exit festival official website. Playback album was finally released digitally on 1 June 2011. In November, the band released the video for the song "Primenjena ljubav" ("Applied Love"), which featured guest appearance by Veliki Prezir frontman Vladimir Kolarić.

On 30 June 2012, Eva Braun performed on the last evening of the first Belgrade Calling festival. On 15 December, the band celebrated twenty years since the release of their debut album with a concert in Belgrade's Dom omladine. On the concert, the band performed Prisluškivanja in its entirety. In January 2013, the band released the video for the song "Sve što gubiš sam ja" ("All that You're Losing Is Me") from Playback. The video was directed by Aleksandar Marić, who used some of the material recorded for the documentary Route 66: Glavna ulica Amerike (Route 66: America's Main Street) to make the video, which was his gift to the band.

In September 2014, the band released the single "Dan posle" ("The Day After"), announcing their new EP. In June 2015, the band released the single "Rikošet" ("Ricochet"), and in November 2015 the single "Kao kišna kap" ("Like a Drop of Rain").

On 7 September 2017, the band held a sold-out concert in Belgrade Youth Centre. The concert featured numerous guests: the bands Ničim Izazvan and Magic Bush, Električni Orgazam frontman Srđan Gojković "Gile", Disciplina Kičme frontman Dušan Kojić "Koja", Veliki Prezir frontman Vladimir Kolarić "Kole", Darkwood Dub bass guitarist Miodrag "Miki" Ristić, Kristali frontman Dejan Gvozden, Autopark members Ognjenka Lakićević and Nikola Berčekom and actor Sergej Trifunović. All the funds raised from the concert were dedicated to improvement of treatment and curing of Duchenne muscular dystrophy in Serbia. In 2016, director Robert Bukarica recorded a documentary film about the band entitled The Story of Eva Braun.

== Legacy ==
The album Prisluškivanja was polled in 1998 as 75th on the list of 100 greatest Yugoslav popular music albums in the book YU 100: najbolji albumi jugoslovenske rok i pop muzike (YU 100: The Best albums of Yugoslav pop and rock music).

In 2006, the song "Sasvim običan dan" was ranked No. 58 on the B92 Top 100 Domestic Songs list.

The lyrics of 12 songs by the band were featured in Petar Janjatović's book Pesme bratstva, detinjstva & potomstva: Antologija ex YU rok poezije 1967 - 2007 (Songs of Brotherhood, Childhood & Offspring: Anthology of Ex YU Rock Poetry 1967 - 2007).

== Members ==
- Goran Vasović – vocals, bass, guitar
- Petar Dolinka – vocals, guitar (1990–1996, 2007-2012)
- Milan Glavaški – guitar (1990–1996, 2007-2013, 2018)
- Ljubomir Rajić – drums (1990–1996, 2007-2023)
- Zvonko Stojkov – guitar (from 1996)
- Srđan Ljiljak – drums (1996–2003)
- Dušan Ševarlić – bass (1996–2003)
- Saša Džuklevski – guitar (2000–2003)
- Goran Obradović – bass (from 2007)
- Albert Šeregelj – keyboards, backing vocals (2013-2018, from 2020)
- Goran Sadžakov – keyboards (2019)
- Damjan Dašić - drums, backing vocals (from 2024)

== Discography ==
=== Studio albums ===
- Prisluškivanja (1992)
- Pop Music (1995)
- Heart Core (1998)
- Everest (2001)
- Playback (2011)

=== Live albums ===
- Unplugged 16 April 1993. (1993)

=== Compilation albums ===
- First & Last (2000)
- Off the Record (2008)
- Odvedi me iz ovog grada (2021)

=== Extended plays ===
- Nowhere Land (1999)

=== Non-album singles ===
- Zviždi Srbija (1997)
- Hajde sanjaj me sanjaj (1997)
- Vrteška (1997)
- Dan posle (2014)
- Rikošet (2015)
- Kao kišna kap (2015)
- Put za Lisabon (2019)
- Ti si sve (2022)
- Jadransko more (2023)
- Komadić koji nedostaje (2023)
- Lastovo (2026)

== Other sources ==
- Aleksandar S. Jankovic: BIOGRAFIJA, Sunday, 13 May 2007 (in Serbian)
