= Gitarijada =

Music festival held in Zaječar, Serbia

- Genre: Rock
- Locations: Zaječar, Serbia
- Years active: 1966 – present
- Website: www.gitarijada.rs

Gitarijada (Serbian Cyrillic: Гитаријада, lit. 'Guitar Fest') is a music festival held in Zaječar, Serbia.

Held since 1966, Gitarijada is one of the longest lasting festivals in Serbia and in South Eastern Europe and the largest festival of young and unaffirmed bands in South Eastern Europe. Apart from the competition of unaffirmed bands from the region of former Yugoslavia, the festival program includes performances of established acts.

== History ==
Gitarijada was founded in 1966 by Zlatni Prsti guitarist and vocalist Momčilo Radenković. First Gitarijada was held in Dom JNA in Zaječar. During the following years, Kosta Kostadinović "Čauš" became the festival's main organizer.

Because there were no official records of winners until 1974, not all the winners before this year are officially documented.

Year	Jury's choice	Audience's choice	Headliners of the non-competitive part
1974	Viktorija (Niš)	Zlatni Prsti (Zaječar)	
1975	Orion (Belgrade)	Orion (Belgrade)	
1976	Oktopus (Subotica)	Oktopus (Subotica)	
1977	Mama Rock (Niš)	Madrigali (Bitola)	
1978	Galija (Niš)	PU (Skopje)	
1979	OPS (Smederevo)	Visoko Mišljenje (Zaječar)	
1980	Pauk (Zavidovići)	Dr Ton (Bačka Palanka)	
1981	Cilindar (Skopje)	Zoster (Zaječar)	
1982	Crna Ruža (Zaječar)	Crna Ruža (Zaječar)	
1983	Nova Zemlja (Valjevo)	Nova Zemlja (Valjevo)	
1984	Dinar (Banja Luka)	Dinar (Banja Luka)	
1985.	Ogledala (Rijeka)	Ogledala (Rijeka)	
1986	Dr Steel (Rijeka)	Dr Steel (Rijeka)	
1987	Zijan (Gevgelija)	Zijan (Gevgelija)	
1988	Vrijeme Nježnosti (Split)	Karizma (Belgrade)	
1989	Džersi (Rijeka)	Zippo (Split)	
1990	Don Marcel (Beli Manastir)	Grof (Belgrade)	
1991	Revolveri (Župa Aleksandrovačka)	Cirusi (Negotin)	
1992	Kazna Za Uši (Belgrade)	Kazna Za Uši (Belgrade)	
1993	Bjesovi (Gornji Milanovac)	Bjesovi (Gornji Milanovac)	
1994	Riff (Zaječar)	Ništa Ali Logopedi (Šabac)	
1995	Jelena U Parku Jure (Zrenjanin)	Jelena U Parku Jure (Zrenjanin)	
1996	Muve (Novi Sad)	Muve (Novi Sad)	
1997	Tattoo (Prijedor)	NCF (Raška)	
1998	Vibe (Belgrade)	Fobija (Ušće na Ibru)	
1999	Jelizaveta Bam (Zaječar)	Brandon Walsh (Negotin)	
2000	Agenda (Belgrade)	Blood Eruption (Zaječar)	
2001	Prvi Put (Belgrade)		
2002	Sarah K (Novi Sad)	Midgard (Šabac)	
2003	Redovna Stvar (Zrenjanin)	Moondive (Belgrade)	
2004	Demether (Zrenjanin)	Infest (Jagodina)	
2005	Broken Strings (Belgrade)	Priručnik Janga Trovača (Zaječar)	Rambo Amadeus, Riblja Čorba, Divlje Jagode, Kraljevski Apartman, YU Grupa, Kanda, Kodža i Nebojša, Vatreni Poljubac, Atomsko Sklonište, Negative, Alen Islamović & Mladen Vojiić "Tifa"
2006	Full Flavor (Belgrade)	Ljute Papričice (Belgrade)	Uriah Heep, Kerber, Night Shift, Eyesburn, Bjesovi, KUD Idijoti, Partibrejkers, 357, Van Gogh
2007	Nightfall (Belgrade)	Anti Dote (Pirot)	Wishbone Ash, Ken Hensley, Divlje Jagode, Dado Topić, Neverne Bebe, Riblja Čorba
2008	Magma (Belgrade)	Hate-tech (Zaječar)	Disciplina Kičme, Laibach
2009	The Dark Ocean (Sombor)	Brain Damage (Zaječar); Plood (Zaječar)	Steve Lukather, Darkwood Dub, Sunshine
2010	As I Fall (Banja Luka)	Mind Reflection (Zaječar)	Van Gogh, Psihomodo Pop, Overdrive, Bjesovi, Kiki Lesendrić & Piloti, Night Shift
2011	Cotton Pickers (Mladenovac)	Dok 7 (Niš)	Zlatko Manojlović, Riblja Čorba, Obojeni Program, Disciplina Kičme, Dado Topić, Kultur Shock, Vlatko Stefanovski, Zona B
2012	Bas i Stega (Beograd)	VIS Novi Dan (Zaječar)	Dubioza Kolektiv, Let 3, Eyesburn, Orthodox Celts, Bajaga i Instruktori, Hladno Pivo, Obojeni Program
2013	Mud Factory (Vranje)	Huti Ota Tre (Zaječar)	Zabranjeno Pušenje, Kanda, Kodža i Nebojša, Prljavi Inspektor Blaža i Kljunovi, Darkwood Dub, Parni Valjak, Elemental, Ritam Nereda
2014	Holographic Human Element (Travnik)	Meda Vuk i Sandokan (Petrovac na Mlavi)	Prljavo Kazalište, Partibrejkers, Goblini, Pero Defformero, Dža ili Bu, Sevi, Riblja Čorba, Van Gogh, Atomsko Sklonište, YU Grupa, The Dibidus, Lajko Felix
2015	Syleth (Rijeka)	Up n' Downs (Mozirje)	Guano Apes, Therapy?, Darko Rundek & Cargo Trio, Gibonni & Vlatko Stefanovski, Kerber, Laibach, Van Gogh, Dubioza Kolektiv, Karizma, Galija, Generacija 5, Električni Orgazam
2016	Hadži Prodane Duše (Užice)	LSD (Logic System Disorder) (Banja Luka)	Uriah Heep, Zlatni Prsti, Van Gogh, Orthodox Celts, Ritam Nereda, Teška Industrija, Riblja Čorba, Bjesovi, Eyesburn, Kerber, Love Hunters
2017	KI (Kumanovo)	Opposite Way (Niš)	The Cult, Nazareth, Riblja Čorba, Bajaga i Instruktori, Dejan Cukić & Spori Ritam Band, Hadži Prodane Duše, Generacija 5
2018	Aleja Velikana (Beograd)		Billy Idol, Saxon, Neverne Bebe, Dejan Cukić & Spori Ritam Band, Partibrejkers, Nikola Čuturilo, Galija, Psihomodo Pop, Hadži Prodane Duše, Ki
2019	BendOver (Beograd)	Sanitarium (Beograd)	

== See also ==
- List of historic rock festivals
