= Popcycle =

- Popcycle, from left to right: Nataša Katić, Milan Glavaški, Ljubomir Rajić and Goran Obradović

Background information
- Also known as: Gervasius Twinkleminkleson
- Origin: Bečej, Serbia, FR Yugoslavia
- Genres: Britpop, pop rock
- Years active: 1994 – 1999 (reunions: 2007)
- Labels: Automatik Records, B92, Radio BOOM 93
- Spinoff of: Eva Braun
- Past members: Goran Obradović; Ljubomir Rajić; Milan Glavaški; Nataša Katić
- Website: Official website

Popcycle was a Serbian pop rock band from Bečej, formed as a faction of the popular Serbian band Eva Braun.

== History ==
=== Formation, rise to prominence (1994–1996) ===
The first signs of the band existence were noted in the magazine Ritam (Rhythm) on early Summer of 1994, where the rock journalist Bojana Žikic described the band as "Gordon Gano meets Stipe and Buckley". The band was formed by Eva Braun members Milan Glavaški (guitar, vocals) and Ljubomir Rajić (drums), who, having performed as a cover band under the stodgy name Gervasius Twinkleminkleson (the name of an Alan Ford comic book character), were joined by Goran Obradović (bass). While awaiting for the Eva Braun magnum opus, the album Pop music, featuring the song "Kopija" ("The Copy"), a hit song originally written for Popcycle, and dissatisfied with the atmosphere within group, the three focused their creativity on Popcycle, frequently performing live and gaining a loyal fan base.

After the July 1996 performance at the Belgrade SKC rooftop, the original Eva Braun lineup disbanded. At the time, Popcycle recorded a promotional video for the song "Orbitalna putovanja" ("Orbital travellings"), a science fiction mini film directed by Uroš Stojanović, presenting the band to a wider audience. The band also signed a contract with Automatik Records through which the band their debut EP Orbitalna putovanja, released during the Summer of 1996, composed of five songs. The entire release featured Ljubomir Rajić recording the keyboard sections on all tracks beside the drums. Being a conceptual release, united with the band inspiration with space as the main lyrical theme, the band wanted to present an authentic release influenced by the Beatles EP Magical Mystery Tour and the Idoli eponymous EP.

=== Lineup change, disbandment (1996–1999) ===
After the EP release, in October of the same year, the band was joined by a keyboard player and backing vocalist Nataša Katić, a former Mary Poppins member, becoming a quartet following the Suede influences. The new lineup had their first live appearance at the Serbian Independence Day movie premier, performing a cover version of the R.E.M. song "It's the End of the World as We Know It (And I Feel Fine)". The following year, the band entered the Belgrade Do-re-mi studio from February 9 until March 21 and made recordings produced by Predrag Pejić and featuring guest appearances by Deže Molnar (saxophone), Željko Đurđevac (harmonica), Bela Farkaš (saxophone), Vladimir Nežić (trombon) and Dragan Kozarčić (trumpet).

The material appeared on the debut album, Popcyclopedia, released by Automatik Records in May 1997. Composed of fourteen songs, including the tracks "Vilenjaci" ("The Elves"), for which a promotional video was recorded directed by Aca Ilić, "Vrli novi dan" ("Brave New Day") and "Ona zna" ("She Knows"), the band presented their vision of pop music combined with esoteric lyrics, influenced by at the time popular britpop music, which was praised by both the audience and the critics. During the same year, the song "Devojka iz svemira" ("A Girl From Outer Space"), originally released on Orbitalna putovanja, appeared on the various artists compilation Ovo je zemlja za nas?!? (This Is The Land For Us?!?), released by Radio BOOM 93 and B92.

Two years later, in 1999, two songs from the second studio album, "Vilenjaci" ("The Elves") and "Leptiri" ("The Butterflies"), appeared on the Automatik Records various artists compilation Recordings. During the same year, the band recorded a cover version of the Rijeka band Fit song "Zaboravit ću sve" ("I Will Forget Everything"), originally released on the 1988 album Daj mi ruku (Give Me Your Hand), for the B92 various artists cover album Korak napred 2 koraka nazad (A Step Forward 2 Step Backwards). The recording, co-produced by the band with Jan Šaš and Dušan Ševarlić, featured guest appearances by producer Ševarlić and Veliki Prezir frontman Vladimir Kolarić on backing vocals. This was the last recording the band had made, as Popcycle disbanded due to Glavaški and Obradović's return to Eva Braun.

=== One-off reunion (2007) ===
On May 4, 2007, the band reunited for a one-off show at the Milan Glavaški solo concert, held at the Bečej club Penny Lane, performing their well-known songs, including "Dorian Gray", "Digitalni san" ("Digital Dream"), "Još malo" ("A Bit More"), "Od mene" ("From Me"), and "Orbitalna putovanja" ("Orbital Travellings"). During the same year, as a part of the Automatik Records label Arhiva reissues, the album Popcyclopedia had been rereleased on CD.

== Discography ==
=== Studio albums ===
- Popcyclopedia (1997)

=== Extended plays ===
- Orbitalna putovanja (1996)

=== Other appearances ===
- "Devojka iz svemira" (Ovo je zemlja za nas?!?; 1997)
- "Vilenjaci" / "Leptiri" (Recordings; 1999)
- "Zaboravit ću sve" (Korak napred 2 koraka nazad; 1999)
