= Veliki prezir (album) =

Studio album by Veliki Prezir
- Released: 1996
- Recorded: June 1996; Do-Re-Mi studio, Novi Sad, O studio, Belgrade
- Genre: Indie rock
- Length: 41:33
- Labels: Metropolis Records; MRK 3111 / MCD 039
- Producers: Aleksandar Stamenković, Predrag Pejić, Veliki Prezir

Veliki Prezir chronology
| Veliki prezir (1996) | 1 2 3 4 (1997) |

Reissue cover

Professional ratings
Review scores
| Source | Rating |
|---|---|
| Naša Borba | favorable link |

Veliki prezir (The great contempt) is an album by the Serbian alternative rock band Veliki Prezir, released by Metropolis records in 1996. Initially being available on compact cassette only, the album, with the Kanda, Kodža i Nebojša debut album Guarda Toma! was rereleased as on CD as a split album in 2001.

== Track listing ==
All music and lyrics by Vladimir Kolarić.

| No. | Title | Length |
|---|---|---|
| 1. | "Svetleće" (Glowing) | 3:45 |
| 2. | "Padati" (Falling down) | 1:57 |
| 3. | "Samo tebe znam" (It is only you I know) | 2:59 |
| 4. | "Reke teku brodovima" (Rivers flow through the ships) | 4:00 |
| 5. | "Minnesota" (Minnesota) | 3:26 |
| 6. | "Između" (In between) | 4:27 |
| 7. | "Ne znam" (I don't know) | 3:40 |
| 8. | "Vreme" (Time) | 2:20 |
| 9. | "Dobro je" (It is fine) | 4:52 |
| 10. | "Budi Sunce" (Be the sun) | 2:50 |
| 11. | "Odvodi" (Let-offs) | 3:12 |
| 12. | "Na tragu" (On the trace) | 4:05 |

== Personnel ==
=== Veliki Prezir ===
- Vladimir Kolarić — guitar, vocals
- Slavko Kontra — guitar
- Predrag Ilčešin — bass
- Dušan Kuzmanović — drums

=== Additional personnel ===
- Ivana Gordić — backing vocals on "Minnesota"
- Milan Jovanović — artwork by [design]
- Velja Mijanović — engineer [postproduction]
- Zoran Petrović "Petrija" — percussion [tambourine]
- Veliki Prezir — producer
- Aleksandar Stamenković "Stamena" — programmed by [emulator], recorded by, producer
- Predrag Pejić "Pedja" — recorded by, producer
