= Xanax (band) =

Serbian musical group from Belgrade

- Origin: Belgrade, Serbia
- Genres: Alternative rock, indie rock, noise rock, electronic rock, experimental rock, neo-psychedelia
- Years active: 2008 – 2014
- Labels: Icecream disco, Ammonite records
- Past members: Sana Garić; Dejan Stanisavljević; David Popović, Luna Škopelja, Nebojša Mrdjenović, Ninoslav Filipović; Borko Borac; Vladimir Marković

Xanax was a Serbian musical group from Belgrade.

== Discography ==
=== Studio albums ===
- Ispod površine (2012)

=== Other appearances ===
- "Ispod površine" (Femixeta; 2011)
- "Savršena rešetka" (Re start II (BiH); 2012)
- "Reč iz filma" (Femixeta; 2013)
