= Lira Vega =

Serbian alternative rock band

- Also known as: Pozorište Šešira
- Origin: Belgrade, Serbia
- Genres: Alternative rock; post-rock; surf rock; punk rock; pop rock; soul
- Years active: 1998–2000; 2002–present
- Labels: PGP-RTS, Beopolis, Lampshade Media
- Members: Vladimir Đorđević; Zoja Borovčanin
- Past members: Boris Mladenović; Dejan Utvar; Dragan Novković; Nemanja Aćimović

Lira Vega (Serbian Cyrillic: Лира Вега; transl. Lyra Vega) is a Serbian alternative rock band formed in Belgrade in 1998.

Originally formed as a part of the theatrical troupe Pozorište Šešira (The Hat Theatre), the band initially performed under the Pozorište Šešira moniker. After touring with the troupe in 2000, the band ended their activity. The group reformed in 2002 under the name Lira Vega, gaining prominence on the Serbian and regional rock scene. Currently the band consists of forming members Zoja Borovčanin (vocals) and Vladimir Ðorđević (guitar).

== History ==
=== Pozorište Šešira (1998–2000) ===
The band was formed in 1998 as a part of the Theatrical troupe Pozorište Šešira (The Hat Theatre) by Zoja Borovčanin (vocals), Vladimir Ðorđević (guitar), Nemanja Aćimović (bass guitar) and Dejan Utrvar (drums), in order to compose the music for the play Zima ili snovi ili putovanje u svim pravcima (Winter or Dreams or Travelling in All Directions). Under the Pozorište Šešira moniker, the band had their first live appearance in March 1998 at the Belgrade club Underground, at the promotion of a hat fashion line by designer Ljudmila Stratimirović.

The song "Alfa Akvari" (transliteration for "Alpha Aquarii"), which promoted Zima ili snovi ili putovanje u svim pravcima, appeared on the first place of the Radio B92 domestic singles list for several weeks. Following the success of the single, the band started performing frequently at Belgrade clubs and in March 1999 the band performed as an opening act for Obojeni Program. In December of the same year, with the Pozorište Šešira theatre troupe, they had a tour across Slovenia as a part of the Metelkova cultural centre anniversary. After the tour, the band ended their activity.

=== Lira Vega (2002–present) ===
In 2002 the band was reformed and renamed to Lira Vega. The name was chosen after a character portrayed by Borovčanin in a play performed by Pozorište Šešira. During the same year, they performed at the REFRACT festival (Regional Festival of Alternative Culture in Belgrade), held on the birthday of the Belgrade Student's Cultural Centre Radio (SKC radio), along with the bands Jarboli, Bushcraft, Obojeni Program and Let 3. Their song "Kometa" ("The Comet") had been on the first place of the SKC radio top list for several weeks. The band also performed at the Future Shock stage at the 2003 Exit festival, the first Rijeka Open Fest, Otokultivator festival at the isle of Vis and the Ljubljana Trnfest.

During the summer of 2002, the band recorded the material for their debut album, but it was not until April 2004 that their eponymous album was released through PGP-RTS. The album presented the band as a unique alternative act featuring the song lyrics sung by the vocalist Zoja Borovcanin in an invented language. Borovčanin had also made guest appearances at the Neočekivana Sila Koja Se Iznenada Pojavljuje i Rešava Stvar album Sunca (The Suns), released in 2002, and the Let 3 album Bombardiranje Srbije i Čačka (The Bombing of Serbia and Čačak), released in 2005. Let 3 and Borovčanin won the Davorin musical award for the Best International Cooperation, for the song "Zurle treštat" ("Zurlas Are Blaring") from Bombardiranje Srbije i Čačka. In June 2006 Lira Vega performed as the opening act for Nouvelle Vague on their concert in Belgrade Youth Center. In October 2008 drummer Utvar left the band, thus the band remained a trio with bassist Aćimović switching to drums.

In 2009 the band released their second studio album, Sreća i ljubav (Happiness and Love). The album was released by the band themselves in cooperation with the Beopolis bookshop. With the album the band moved towards more punk rock-oriented sound.

In May 2015, the band, now consisting of Đorđević and Borovčanin only, released their third studio album, Duhovi (Ghosts), through Lampshade Media. The album was announced by the singles "Novo Mesiko" ("New Mexico"), released in April 2014, and "Ja te znam" ("I Know You"), released in April 2015. The album was produced by Đorđević and Boris Mladenović, and featured Dejan Vučetić of Darkwood Dub (on the song "Novo Meksiko") and Robert Telčer of Veliki Prezir (on the song "Ničiji mesec", trans. "No One's Moon") as guests. On January 16, 2016, in Cultural Center Grad in Novi Sad, the band held a concert which featured numerous guest appearances by friends of the band: Darko Džambasov, Janja Lončar, Vladislava Đorđević, Ah Ahilej, Boško Mijušković (of Straight Mickey and the Boyz and Škrtice), Romana Slačala (of Artan Lili), Bojan Slačala (of Artan Lili and Stuttgart Online), Dragan Knežević (of Artan Lili), Vlada Pejković (of Crvi), Sana Garić (of Xanax and Beograd), Dejan Stanisavljević (of Xanax and Beograd), Una Gašić (of Bitipatibi), Ivan Skopulovič (of Bitipatibi and Crvi), Dejan Vučetić (of Darkwood Dub), Miki Ristić (of Darkwood Dub), Marinka Đorđević (of Disciplin A Kitschme), Ilija Ludvig and Boris Mladenović (of Jarboli, Veliki Prezir and Škrtice). A documentary film, entitled Duhovi prošlosti (Ghosts of the Past), was shot during the event. In November 2016 the band released the video for the song "Vudu" ("Voodoo") from Duhovi, directed by painter Milica Simonović. In February 2017 the band released the video for the song "Nema nade" ("There Is No Hope") from the album, featuring footage made by dramatists Maja Pelević and Olga Dimitrijević during their visit to North Korea.

At the end of November 2022, the band released their fourth studio album Posledice rada I (Consequences of Work I). The album was announced by the single "Velika žena" ("Big Woman"), featuring guest appearance by Radeta Vulić (of Popečitelji and Svemirci) on cymbals. The album brought more synth-oriented sound than the band's previous releases. Releasing the album, the band announced the album Posledice rada II, expected to be released during 2023.

== Discography ==
=== Studio albums ===
- Lira Vega (2004)
- Sreća i ljubav (2009)
- Duhovi (2015)
- Posledice rada I (2022)
