= Brazde =

Studio album by Veliki Prezir
- Released: March 22, 2001
- Recorded: May – August 2000; Studio M, Novi Sad
- Genres: Alternative rock, indie rock, experimental music
- Length: 44:43
- Labels: B92; CD0009
- Producers: Dušan Ševarlić, Veliki Prezir

Veliki Prezir chronology
1 2 3 4 (1997)	Brazde (2001)	Ruka bez povratka (2005)

Professional ratings
Review scores
Source	Rating
"OK"	link
B92	(favorable) link

Brazde (Furrows) is the second studio album by the Serbian alternative rock band Veliki Prezir, released by B92 in 2001. The album was recorded at Akademija Studio in Belgrade and Studio M in Novi Sad, and was produced by Dušan Ševarlić and Veliki Prezir.

== Track listing ==
All tracks written and arranged by Vladimir Kolarić and Veliki Prezir.

No.	Title	Length
1.	"Moram da znam" (I have to know)	4:07
2.	"Sutra" (Tomorrow)	4:15
3.	"Neobična sumnja" (Unusual doubt)	3:48
4.	"Hej!" (Hey!)	4:33
5.	"Revolucija" (Revolution)	4:57
6.	"Promene" (Changes)	4:27
7.	"Budi sigurna" (Be certain)	2:53
8.	"Danima" (In days)	4:16
9.	"Snaga motorna / Sila svetova" (Engine power / World force)	6:27

== Personnel ==
=== Veliki Prezir ===
- Vladimir Kolarić — guitar, vocals, acoustic guitar
- Robert Telčer — guitar
- Draga Antov — bass
- Boris Mandić — drums

=== Additional personnel ===
- Alan Smithee Dots — artwork by
- Dušan Ševarlić — backing vocals, arranged by [strings], producer, engineer [post-production], recorded by
- Timea Kalmar — cello
- Branislav Micić — engineer [post-production]
- Milenko Radovanov — photography
- Slobodan Misailović — piano, organ [hammond], percussion, piano [rhodes], recorded by
- Tajj Kvartet — strings
- Jelena Bulatović — viola
- Aleksandra Krčmar — violin
- Jovanka Letić — violin
- Veliki Prezir — producer
