= Kazna Za Uši =

- Kazna Za Uši performing live in Belgrade in 2010

Background information
- Also known as: KZU
- Origin: Belgrade, Serbia
- Genres: Garage rock, punk rock, funk rock
- Years active: 1986 – 1999; 2006; 2009 – present
- Labels: Nova Aleksandrija, Sorabia Disk, Red Luna Records, PGP-RTS, City Records, B92
- Members: Ivan Đorđević; Rudolf Cibulski; Vladimir Markoski; Boris Eftovski
- Past members: Aleksandar Glišić; Dejan Utvar; Goran Markovski; Ivan Cezek; Manja Đorđević; Milan Popović; Nebojsa Dragojlović; Srđan Radmilović; Milan Bjedov; Srđan Todorović
- Website: Official Myspace

Kazna Za Uši (Serbian Cyrillic: Казна За Уши; trans. Ear Punishment) is a Serbian garage rock band from Belgrade.

== History ==
=== Band formation, first releases (1986–1991) ===
The band was formed in Autumn 1986 by lead guitarist and vocalist Ivan Đorđević "Ivek", having their first live appearance during the same year. Four years after, during the Autumn of 1990, the band's first recordings were released on the Nova Aleksandrija various artists compilation Želim jahati do ekstaze, featuring two of the band's songs, "Teleći pogled" ("Calf-like look") and "Nune Papa", along with the songs by newly formed acts such as Darkwood Dub, Euforia, Presing and Klajberi. In January of the following year, the band released their debut single "Deri kamen" ("Gride the Rock"), with "Moj drug" ("My Friend") as the B-side, describing their musical style as "extreme garage rock". Even though the band had many lineup changes, bassist Rudolf Cibulski and drummer Dejan Utvar became the default band members.

=== Rise to prominence, breakup (1992–1999) ===
During the summer of 1992, the band released their debut album Ispod zemlje (Under the Ground), produced by former Električni Orgazam member Ljubomir Jovanović "Jovec", featuring the prominent tracks "Koska" ("The Bone"), "Rođen lud" ("Born Mad") and "Kad budeš mrtav i beo" ("When You Become Dead and White"). The band also performed at the Gitarijada festival in Zaječar, winning the Audience Award for the best act of the year, and Brzi Bendovi Srbije where Đorđević won the best guitarist award and the band's song "Koska" was pronounced the "Rock 'n' roll anthem of Serbia". During the following year, the band often performed at the Belgrade's SKC where, on 9 and 10 April, with an expanded lineup featuring percussion and saxophone and Srđan Todorović on drums, were joined as guests by Električni Orgazam and Partibrejkers members. The band also performed in Skopje and Kumanovo.

In early 1994, the band released their second album, Izliv radosti, napad sreće (An Outburst of Joy, a Seizure of Happiness), partially featuring live material recorded at SKC and new studio recorded material, once again produced by Jovanović. In May of the same year, the Cyprus record label Red Luna released the compilation album 3, featuring six of the previously released songs along with Presing and Overdose recordings. The band also appeared on the various artists compilation Radio Utopia (B92: 1989-1994) with the track "Poklon" ("The Gift")., and the Bez struje various artists unplugged album, recorded at the unplugged festival of the same name held in the Belgrade Sava Centar in January 1994, with the track "Ovde, ovde" ("Here, Here"). The same record label rereleased the band's debut album with live bonus material, recorded live on Radio B92.

In April 1995, the band held four concerts in Slovenia after which came a break in the band's work as Đorđević, on several occasions, went to Greece, performing at clubs. The comeback concert was held at KST in July 1997, where with Đorđević, the lineup featured former Euforia member Srđan Radmilović, and former Kandinsky members, bassist Goran Vujović and drummer Nebojša Dragojlović. With the bassist Milan Popović, the band recorded the album Zauške (Mumps), produced by Jovanović and Goran Živković. The nine songs which appeared on the album featured guests appearances by Boris Krstajić on synthesizer, Branko Kosar on keyboards, and Marijana Nešić, Nikola Đuričko, Boris Milivojević and Nikola Pejak on backing vocals. After the album release, the band ceased to exist.

=== Reunion, reformation (2006, 2009–present) ===
In November 2006, the band reformed for a one-off concert held at the Akademija in order to celebrate the 20th anniversary of the band's formation. Three years after, in Autumn 2009, the band was reformed in the lineup featuring Ivan Đorđević (guitar, vocals), Rudolf Cibulski (bass, backing vocals), and Milan Bjedov (drums) and recorded a comeback single, "Bez pipanja" ("No Touching") in 2010, reaching the fifth place on the Popboks singles chart. In July of the same year, the band performed at the BELEF festival. By the end of 2010, the band had already been joined by the keyboard player Boris Eftovski. In January 2011, the single "Bez pipanja" appeared on the twelfth place on the annual Popboks critics list of the best singles released during 2010. In November 2013, the band recorded the song "S vetrom u kosi" ("With Wind in My Hair") with the band Ex Revolveri.

In February 2015, the band self-released their comeback album entitled Nova zora (New Dawn). The album featured eleven songs, two of them recorded live on their 2011 performance at Akademija, and two of them, "Tamo na mostu" ("There on the Bridge") and "Nahranite hlade" ("Feed the Cold Ones"), being covers of songs by the 1980s new wave band Robna Kuća.

In June 2015, Kazna Za Uši released the single "Čučni, baby" ("Get Down, Baby").

== Discography ==
=== Studio albums ===
Title	Released
Ispod zemlje	1992
Izliv radosti, napad sreće	1994
Zauške	1999

=== Compilation albums ===
Title	Released
3 (with Presing and Overdose)	1998

=== Singles ===
Title	Released
"Deri kamen"	1991
"Bez pipanja"	2010
"S vetrom u kosi" (with Ex Revolveri)	2013

=== Other appearances ===
Title	Album	Released
"Teleći pogled" "Nune Papa"	Želim jahati do ekstaze	1991
"Poklon"	Radio Utopia (B92: 1989-1994)	1994
"Ovde, ovde"	Bez struje	1994

== See also ==
- Punk rock in Yugoslavia
