= Ruka bez povratka =

Studio album by Veliki Prezir
- Released: 2005
- Recorded: 2005, Kombinat studio, Vrbas
- Genre: Alternative rock, indie rock, experimental music
- Length: 42:45
- Label: B92; CD 108
- Producer: Boris Mladenović

Veliki Prezir chronology
Brazde (2001)	Ruka bez povratka (2005)	Nikadjekraj (2009)

Professional ratings
Review scores
Source	Rating
Popboks	link

Ruka bez povratka (A hand with no return) is the third studio album by the Serbian alternative rock band Veliki Prezir, released by B92 in 2005.

== Track listing ==
All tracks written and arranged by Vladimir Kolarić, except track 1, co-written with Boris Mladenović, Robert Telčer, track 4, co-written with Telčer, and track 9, co-written with Mladenović.

No.	Title	Length
1.	"Gubi me sudbina" (Destiny is losing me)	4:07
2.	"Slušam te" (Listening you)	4:02
3.	"300 čuda" (300 wonders)	2:58
4.	"To je dovoljno" (It is enough)	3:43
5.	"Konj" (Horse)	4:44
6.	"Suncokreti" (Sunflowers)	2:57
7.	"U kanalima" (In the channels)	4:27
8.	"Hemija" (Chemistry)	2:34
9.	"Ruka bez povratka" (A hand with no return)	6:37
10.	"Gubi me sudbina (bonus)" (Destiny is losing me (bonus))	4:54

== Personnel ==
=== Veliki Prezir ===
- Vladimir Kolarić — guitar, vocals, synthesizer [Dx7], synthesizer [moog]
- Robert Telčer — guitar, backing vocals, synthesizer [moog]
- Dušan Ševarlić — bass, synthesizer [Dx7], producer [track 6 & 10]
- Robert Radić — drums

=== Additional personnel ===
- Ivan Brusić — mastered by, engineer [post production]
- Boris Mladenović — producer, guitar [track 1], keyboards [track 9]
- Dejan Vučetić — synthesizer [track 4]
- Draga Antov — vocals [track 9]
