= Nikadjekraj =

Studio album by Veliki Prezir
- Released: 2009
- Recorded: 2009, Digimedia studio, Belgrade, Kombinat studio, Vrbas
- Genre: Alternative rock, indie rock, experimental music, blues rock, garage rock
- Length: 39:36
- Label: B92; CD 120
- Producer: Boris Mladenović, Saša Janković

Veliki Prezir chronology
Ruka bez povratka (2005)	Nikadjekraj (2009)

Professional ratings
Review scores
Source	Rating
Groupie.hr	5/5 stars
Mikrofonija	(favorable)
Mulj	(favorable)
Popboks	9/10 stars

Nikadjekraj (Neveristheend) is the fourth studio album by the Serbian alternative rock band Veliki Prezir, released by B92 in 2009. The album was elected as the best domestic album in 2009 according to the critics of the webzine Popboks.

== Track listing ==
All lyrics and music written by Vladimir Kolarić, except track 1 and 4, music written by Veliki Prezir, and track 2, music by Boris Mladenović and Vladimir Kolarić.

No.	Title	Length
1.	"No no"	2:51
2.	"Probudi se sine" (Wake up son)	5:17
3.	"Zakopavam" (I am burying)	3:48
4.	"Šta ja mislim?" (What am I thinking?)	4:11
5.	"Svi se spustite na pod" (Everybody get down to the floor)	3:59
6.	"Danas" (Today)	2:08
7.	"Nema Hrabrosti" (There is no courage)	3:30
8.	"Pomozi Sebi" (Help yourself)	2:19
9.	"Idem dole" (I am going down)	2:53
10.	"Zvoniće" (It is going to ring)	3:34
11.	"Nikadjekraj" (Nevereistheend)	5:06

== Personnel ==
=== Veliki Prezir ===
- Vladimir Kolarić — vocals, guitar, electric piano, bass, tambourine, harmonica
- Robert Telčer — guitar, backing vocals, synthesizer [moog]
- Boris Mladenović — bass, synthesizer, vocals, drums, mixed by [tracks: 3, 8], producer, recorded by
- Robert Radić — drums

=== Additional personnel ===
- Jovana Tokić — artwork by [design]
- Ken Stringfellow — electric piano, percussion [electric], synthesizer, vocals [tracks: 1, 4, 5, 7, 10, 11]
- Igor Bulatović — mastered by, engineer [post-production]
- Milan Prokop — mastered by, engineer [post-production]
- Saša Janković — mastered by, engineer [post-production], mixed by [tracks: 1, 2, 4 to 11], producer
- Dušan Ševarlić — recorded by, bass [track 8]
- Goran Crevar — recorded by
- Janko Maraš — recorded by
- Feđa Frenklin — percussion [track 1]
- Dušan Kuzmanović — drums [track 3]
