= Veliki Prezir =

Serbian rock band

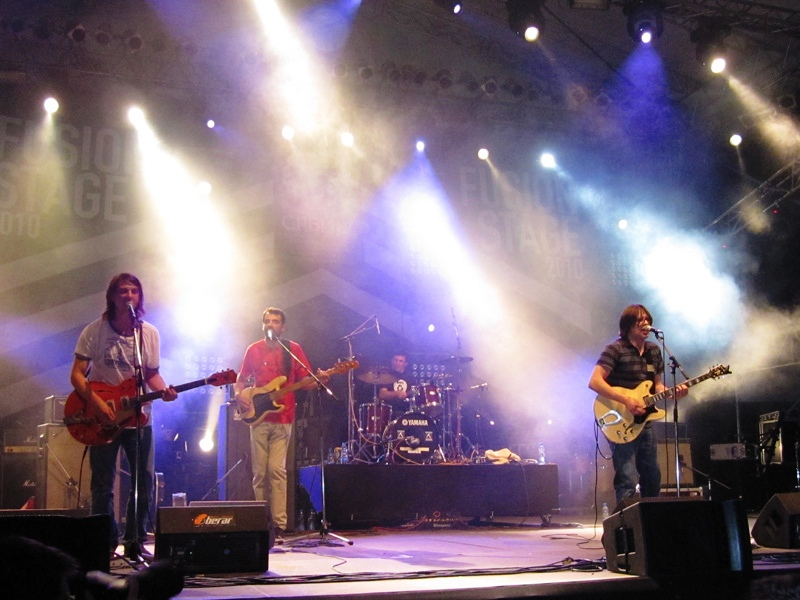
- Veliki Prezir performing live at EXIT festival in 2010: Robert Telčer, Boris Mladenović, Robert Radić and Vladimir Kolarić

Background information
- Also known as: VP
- Origin: Vrbas, Serbia
- Genres: alternative rock, indie rock, pop rock, garage rock, alternative country, experimental music, neo-psychedelia
- Years active: 1994 – present
- Labels: Metropolis Records, B92, Komuna, Automatik
- Members: Boris Mladenović; Robert Radić; Robert Telčer; Vladimir Kolarić
- Past members: Boris Mandić; Draga Antov; Dušan Kuzmanović; Dušan Ševarlić; Predrag Ilčešin; Slavko Kontra
- Website: Official website

Veliki Prezir (Serbian Cyrillic: Велики Презир; trans. The Great Contempt) is a Serbian alternative rock band from Vrbas.

== History ==
=== 1990s ===
Veliki Prezir was formed in June 1994 by a former Holidays member Vladimir Kolarić "Kole" (vocals, guitar), Slavko Kontra (guitar), Predrag Ilčešin (bass guitar) and Dušan Kuzmanović (drums), choosing the band name by the Jean-Luc Godard film Le Mépris. Soon afterward, they entered the studio and recorded a demo featuring the song "Samo tebe znam" ("You Are The Only One I Know"), at the Novi Sad Do-Re-Mi studio, and during the spring of the following year, a promotional video was recorded for the track, making it an immediate hit on television and radio stations.

During June 1996, the lineup recorded their eponymous debut album, Veliki prezir, released in autumn by Metropolis Records on compact cassette only, from which promotional videos were recorded for the songs "Ne znam" ("I Don't Know"), "Dobro je" ("It Is Alright") and "Samo tebe znam", directed by the Serbian director Aca Ilić. After the album release, the band went on an extensive promotional tour all over the FR Yugoslavia, including the appearances at several charity concerts, as well as the performances at the Belgrade clubs KST, Dom Omladine and Studentski Kulturni Centar and the Novi Sad clubs Mačka and NS Plus.

On June 28, 1997, the band performance at the Novi Sad Studio M, was recorded for the live album 1 2 3 4, mixed and produced by Dušan Ševarlić and released on CD by Automatik records. Beside the live versions of ten songs which appeared on the debut, the album also featured the instrumental track "Intro" and the previously unreleased song "Udica" ("The Hook"). After the album release, the lineup changed, featuring Oružjem Protivu Otmičara bassist and vocalist Draga Antov, guitarist Robert Telčer, who previously had played with Intima, Katarza and Boye, and drummer Boris Mandić. The lineup appeared on the various artists cover album Korak napred 2 koraka nazad (A Step Forward 2 Steps Backwards), released in 1999, with the cover of La Strada song "Okean" ("The Ocean").

=== 2000s ===
On March 21, 2001, the band released their second studio album, Brazde (Furrows), recorded during the Summer of 1999 at the Belgrade Akademija studio and on Spring of 2000 at the Novi Sad M studio, released by B92. Once again the band hired the producer Dušan Ševarlić, who also participated the bass sections recording. Guest appearances featured Slobodan Misailović on keyboards and the Tajj string quartet. During the same year, Metropolis reissued the debut album was on CD with Guarda Toma!, Kanda Kodža i Nebojša debut album, as a split album. Also, the song "Neobična sumnja" ("An Unusual Suspicion") appeared on the soundtrack for the film Apsolutnih 100 (Absolute 100), released by Komuna in 2001. A promotional video was created for the song, featuring scenes from the film.

In 2005, the band, featuring the lineup Kolarić, Telčer, Dušan Ševarlić (bass, synthesizer), and former La Strada and Love Hunters member Robert Radić (drums), recorded the third studio album, Ruka bez povratka (A Hand With No Return), released by B92. The album was produced by Jarboli member Boris Mladenović, who also appeared as guitarist, keyboard player and co-author, and guest appearances on the album featured Draga Antov, who did lead vocals on the title track, and Darkwood Dub frontman Dejan Vučetić "Vuča", who played synthesizer on the track "To je dovoljno" ("It Is Enough"). The webzine Popboks enlisted the album as one of the best studio albums of the year 2005. During the same year, the band made a guest appearance on the Autopark song "Ne pričam o sebi" ("I Am Not Talking About Myself"), released as a B-side of the 2005 single "8 godina" ("8 Years"). The following year, the song "Moram da znam" ("I Must Know") appeared on the various artists compilation Sigurno najbolji (Certainly The Best), released by B92.

In 2009, the band released their fourth studio album Nikadjekraj (Neveristheend), released by B92, featuring Boris Mladenović as the new bass guitarist and album co-producer with Saša Janković. Part of the material, recorded and mixed at the Belgrade Digimedia studio and Vrbas Kombinat Record studio, featured the tracks from Kolarević's side project Izgubljeni Vikend (The Lost Weekend). The album featured guest appearances by percussionist Feđa Frenklin on the track "No, No", Dušan Kuzmanović who did drums on the track "Zakopavam" ("I Am Burying"), and Dušan Ševarlić who played bass on "Pomozi sebi" ("Help Yourself"). Special guest appearance featured the American musician Ken Stringfellow, best known for his work with The Posies, R.E.M. and the re-formed Big Star, who played electric piano, synthesizer and did electric percussion and vocals on most of the album tracks. The album was voted the album of the year 2009 by the webzine Popboks. After the album release, the band started a live promotion of the album, performing at the Košutnjak Supernatural Festival.

=== 2010s ===
In February 2010, the band released a promotional video for the track "No, No", reaching the first place for two weeks on Jelen Top 10 list, and in March, the band released a video for the track "Svi se spustite na pod" ("Everybody, Get Down To The Floor"), directed by Aca Ilić, also appearing on the first place on the top list. In March and April, the band held a six-date mini tour, including the March 24 performance at the Belgrade Dom Omladine, being available for live streaming via Live-e Internet television site. Other performances on the tour included Bečej, Zrenjanin, Mostar, and the performance at the Subotica Trenchtown festival. The band also performed at the 2010 Novi Sad Exit festival on July 10, before which in an interview Kolarević stated that the band had started writing new material for the upcoming studio album. In September 2010, it was announced that the band is to enter the studio during the following month in order to record the newly written material. In late September, at the Belgrade Gun club performance, the band marked the end of the tour promoting Nikadjekraj and started performing the songs from the upcoming album.

On January 2, 2011, the band appeared at the New Year's edition of the RTS 2 show Bunt (Rebellion), performing the song "Svi se spustite na pod" and the upcoming single "To" ("It"). At the time, on the webzine Popboks annual lists, "Svi se spustite na pod" appeared at the 7th according to the readers and 3rd place according to the critics on the best domestic song/singles list. On the same lists, promotional videos for the songs "No no" appeared at the 5th and "Svi se spustite na pod" at the 7th place on the best music video list. The following month, the critics of the webzine had made a list of the best domestic studio albums released in the previous decade on which Nikadjekraj appeared at the 2nd and Brazde at the 23rd place. On March 8 of the same year, the band appeared on the Bunt television show, performing six songs: "Ne znam", "Reke teku brodovima", "Konj", "Promene", "Probudi se sine" and "Pomozi sebi". The following day, the band released the first single from the upcoming album "To" for free digital download at the site B92.fm. On March 12, 2011, the band performed at the Belgrade Dom Omladine and the entire concert was being broadcast by Radio B92. In June 2011, the band Eva Braun released the album Playback and Kolarević appeared as guest vocalist on the track "Primenjena ljubav" ("Applied Love"), which featured the lines "Svaka te linija zna, kao u pesmi Velikog prezira" ("Every line knows you, like in a Veliki Prezir song") in the song lyrics.

In December 2012, the band released EP Svetlost i dim (Light and Smoke). The EP, announced by the singles "Novčanik" ("Wallet"), released in July, and "Da" ("Yes"), released in November, was released on vinyl, as well as for free listening on the band's official Bandcamp page. On December 4, 2014, the band held a concert in Belgrade club Božidarac, featuring the bands Dreambirds and Lira Vega as guests.

== Discography ==
- Veliki prezir (1996)
- Brazde (2001)
- Ruka bez povratka (2005)
- Nikadjekraj (2009)
