= Oružjem Protivu Otmičara =

Serbian band

- Also known as: OPO
- Origin: Zrenjanin, Serbia
- Genres: Pop punk, power pop
- Years active: 1992 – 1999; 2002 – 2004; 2007 – present
- Members: Nikola Pavković; Verica Marinković; Pavle Kirćanski; Nebojša Durmanović
- Past members: Vladimir Jovanović; Draga Antov; Dragana Mrkajić; Darko Kurjak; Aleksandar Tolimir; Marko Živković; Ivana Cvejin; Ivana Radmanovac; Žarko Dunić; Jovana Oljača; Srđan Dević; Marko Čokulov; Jovana Popović

Oružjem Protivu Otmičara (Serbian Cyrillic: Оружјем Противу Отмичара, trans. With Weapons Against Kidnappers) is a Serbian pop punk/power pop band from Zrenjanin.

== History ==
=== 2000s ===
The lineup stopped performing in 2004, and the band was inactive until 2007, when the new lineup which, beside Pavković, included Zarko Dunić (bass), Ivana Radmanovac (guitar, vocals) and Srđan Dević (drums), released the album Znaš ko te pozdravio? (You Know Who Greeted You ?). The album featured the cover version of Slađana Milošević song "Miki, Miki". On May 9, 2008, the band performed as an opening act for The Damned in Novi Sad.

In 2009, Multimedia Records released a compilation album Groovanje devedesete uživo featuring a live recording of the band's song "Dobra ideja" (released on the compilation as "Good Idea"), recorded live at the Belgrade KST on November 11, 1995.

=== 2010s ===
In June 2010, the lineup changed, featuring new bass guitarist Marko Čokulov and vocalist Jovana Oljača, and the band started working on a new studio release. In 2014, the band released the single "Panika" ("Panic").

=== 2015 - 2018 ===
In the summer of 2015, the band changes the lineup again, featuring vocalist Jovana Popović, guitarist Pavle Kirćanski, and drummer Nebojša Durmanović. This lineup saw Nikola Pavković return to his original instrument - the bass guitar. They've released two singles - "Progutaj Me" ("Swallow Me") and "Vrati Mi Snove" ("Gimme Back My Dreams"). In January 2016, the band changed the lineup again and with the release of the third single "Lica" ("Faces"), the new singer Verica Marinković was introduced. The band released another video in April 2016 titled "Marina" ("Marina"). The band has held its last concert on 26.04.2018 on the R.A.F Reafirmator Fest, after which it went on hiatus.

== Legacy ==
The lyrics of 3 songs by the band were featured in Petar Janjatović's book Pesme bratstva, detinjstva & potomstva: Antologija ex YU rok poezije 1967 - 2007 (Songs of Brotherhood, Childhood & Offspring: Anthology of Ex YU Rock Poetry 1967 - 2007).

== Discography ==
=== Studio albums ===
Title	Released
Oružjem protivu otmičara	1995
BarbieCue	1996
Komadić koji nedostaje	1998
Maštoplov	2002
Znaš ko te pozdravio	2007

=== Remix albums ===
Title	Released
BarbieMix	1997

=== Singles ===
Title	Released
"U koloru"	1997
"Mladiću moj" / "Ptica" / "1000"	1999
"Good Idea"	2009

== See also ==
- Punk rock in Yugoslavia
