= Vladimir Krakov =

Serbian musician

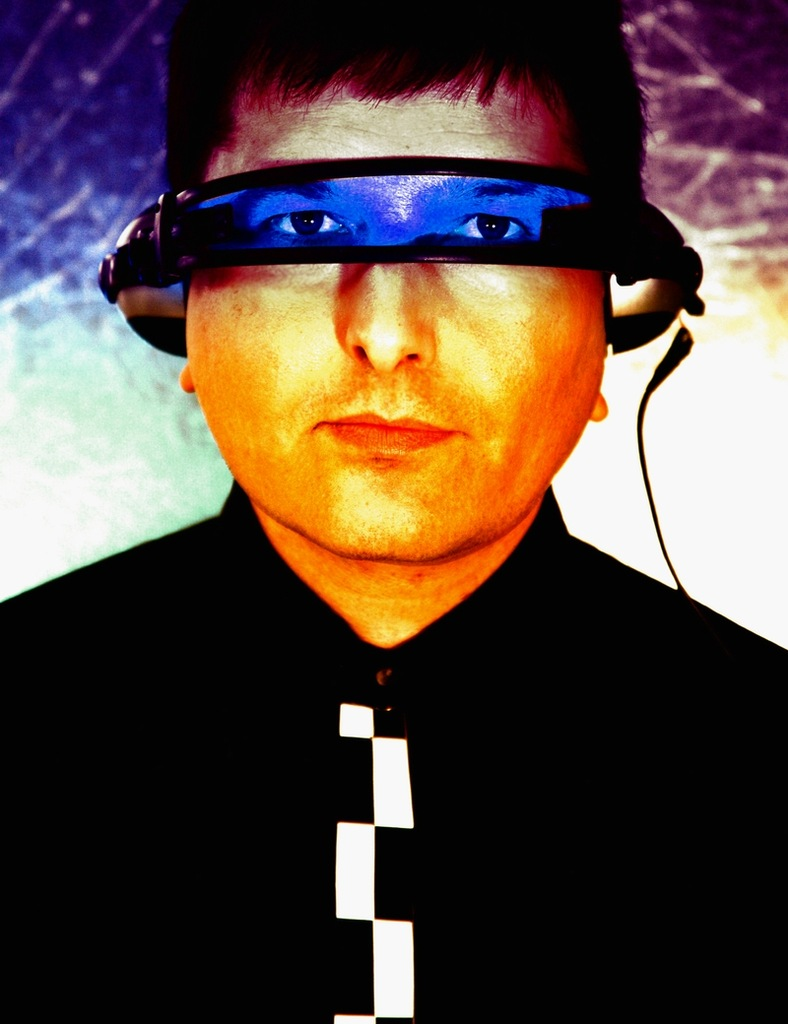
Portrait of Vladimir Krakov

Vladimir Krakov (born 17 June 1970 in Belgrade, Yugoslavia) is a pen-name of Serbian writer and rock musician Vladimir Marković.

== Music ==
Krakov formed Presing along with Zoran Radovic at the age of 20, and very soon became appreciated for his specific manner of guitar playing and harmony treatment, being influenced to some extent by works and way of thinking of such authors as Glenn Branca, Brian Eno and Robert Fripp. Krakov released three albums with Presing, one with Tornado Ptice and one with Xanax. He also contributed as an author with Menson Benson Sextet, Kanda, Kodža i Nebojša and as an author of applied music for movies and television.

== Literature ==
In his first book "In a Train to Disneyland" (U vozu za Diznilend, SKC, Belgrade 1994), along with short stories, Krakov also published his essay on theory of poetry "Return of Poetry to Singing", in which he claimed that poetry which exists only in written form reminds of a "once powerful tribe which now scrapes in reservation". He advocated the singing as a natural incarnation of poetry, which should reemerge as more appreciated model, while "pencil" poetry should remain what musical notation is to music.

Having for a long time favored music over literature, he only sporadically wrote and published short stories in periodicals. His first novel "King of Mosquitoes" was written and published in English by an independent publisher 6th Colone (6de Kolonne) from Eindhoven, and later re-written as a significantly different novel in Serbian with the same title and motifs. "King of Mosquitoes is a skilfully narrated story about the Serbian generation X, colored by a blend of brilliant streetwise humor and sudden trips to phantasmagoria," (Richard Byrne New York Press 10 December 2002).

Only in 2011 Krakov decided to continue his writing career, having finished his second novel "House That Lessens" (Kuća koja se smanjuje, Stubovi kulture, Belgrade 2012). After one of the major publishing houses in Post-Yugoslav region Stubovi Kulture (Pillars of Culture) announced that Krakov contracted with them, the author proclaimed having started working on his next novel titled "Voice-over", to be also released in 2012.

== Discography and bibliography ==
- Presing "Priča o totemu, duhu koji hoda, psu i razočaranoj ženi" (1992)
- Presing "600 nebo" (2002)
- Presing "Zanos bez snova" (2006)
- Presing "Neurokrem" (2014)
- Presing "Povratak u krntiju" (2021)
- Tornado ptice "Prozračno poslepodne" (1995)
- Kanda Kodža i Nebojša "Igračka plačka" (1996)
- Menson Benson Sextet "Sharpening the Milestone" (2000)
- Xanax "Ispod površine" (2012)
- "U vozu za Diznilend" (1994)
- "King of Mosquitoes" (2002)
- "Kralj komaraca" (2006)
- "Kuća koja se smanjuje" (2012)
