= Darkwood Dub =

Serbian alternative rock band

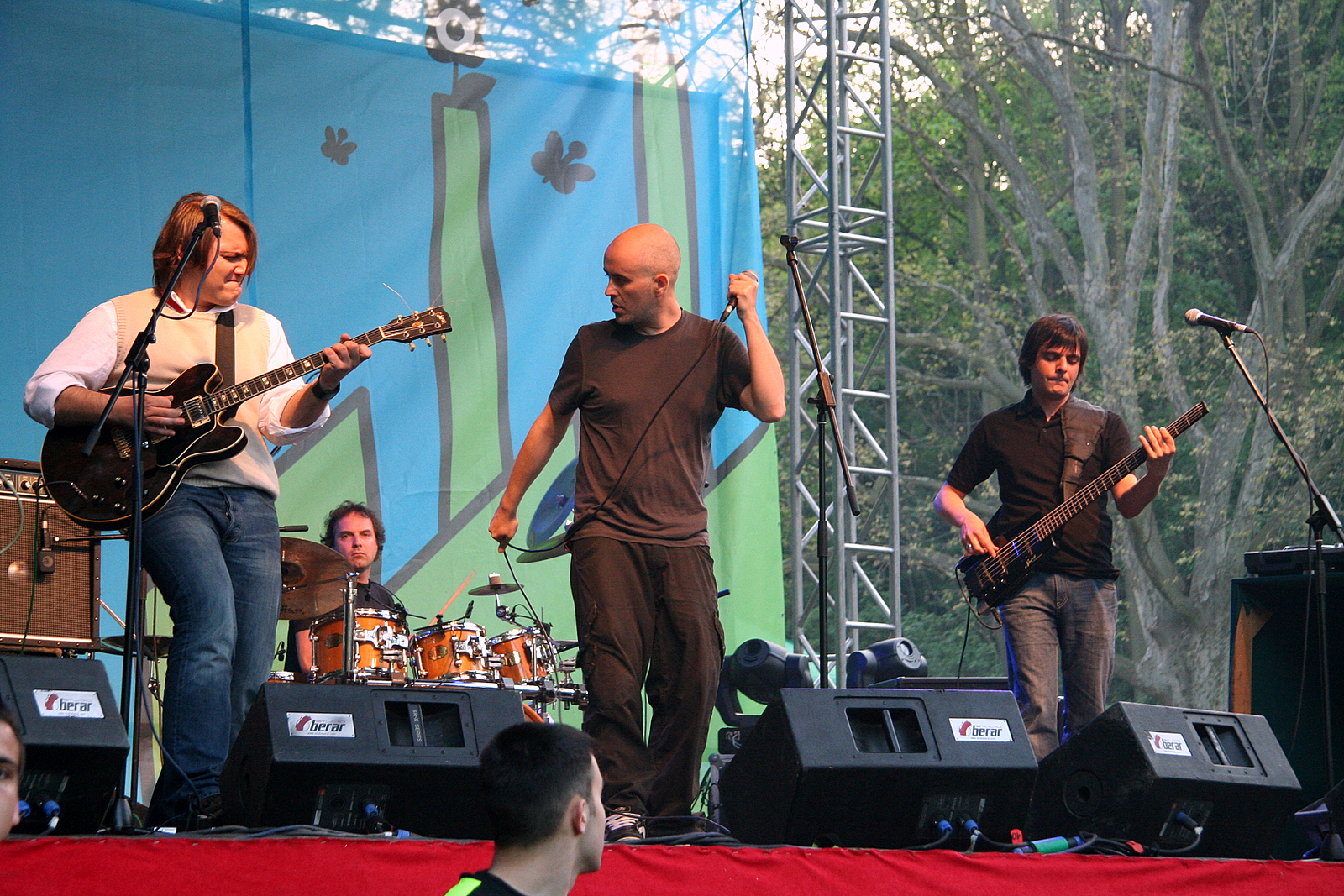
- Darkwood Dub at the Supernatural Festival in 2008

Background information
- Also known as: Darkvud Dab
- Origin: Belgrade, Serbia
- Genres: Alternative rock; indie rock; noise rock; reggae; dub; electronic rock; drum and bass; experimental rock; downtempo; jazz
- Years active: 1988–2017
- Labels: Take It Or Leave It Records, B92, Exit Music, Odličan hrčak
- Past members: Vladimir Jerić; Bojan Drobac; Dejan Vučetić; Milorad Ristić; Lav Bratuša; Vasil Hadžimanov
- Website: www.darkwooddub.rs

Darkwood Dub was a Serbian alternative rock band formed in Belgrade in 1988. In the years after the formation the band gradually grew to prominence on the Serbian rock scene, eventually becoming one of the most notable acts of the 1990s and 2000s Serbian and regional scene. Their music spawned many different genres. It was characterized by a mixture of live drumming and electronic percussion with frequent use of slide guitar, synthesizers and samplers and succinct and introspective lyrics, sung with offbeat vocals of Dejan Vučetić. The band cooperated with a number of musicians—most notably prominent jazz musicians Vasil Hadžimanov and Bisera Veletanlić—and composed scores for several films and theatre plays. The group released eight studio albums before disbanding in 2017.

== History ==
=== Band formation, first recordings (1988–1991) ===
The band was formed in autumn of 1988, originally with an intention of playing a combination of reggae and noise music, in the lineup consisting of two drummers (playing the same drum kit), two bassists, a vocalist and a rhythm machine. The inspiration for the name came from the Italian comic book Zagor, whose titular character lives in the forest named Darkwood. After several years and many personnel changes, the default lineup became Vladimir Jerić "Vlidi" (guitar), Bojan Drobac "Bambi" (guitar), Dejan Vučetić "Vuča" (vocals), Milorad Ristić "Miki" (bass guitar) and Lav Bratuša (drums).

The band had their first live appearances at the Belgrade Students' Cultural Centre in May 1991. During the same year, the band released their first recordings, the tracks "Veliki duh" ("The Great Spirit") and "Srećna glava" ("Happy Head"), on the Nova Aleksandrija record label various artists compilation Želim jahati do ekstaze (I Want to Ride to Ecstasy), also featuring the bands Presing, Kazna Za Uši, Klajberi and Euforija. The release immediately became a rarity since all the records were printed in Zagreb where, due to the outbreak of the Yugoslav Wars, remained to be sold in Croatia only.

=== Rise to prominence (1992–1999) ===
From December 1992 until May 1993, the band recorded their debut studio album Paramparčad (Splinters), produced by Željko Božić, which was not released until 1995 by Take It Or Leave It Records. Since it took a long while from the band formation to the moment when the debut was released, the album featured a selection of songs from the band's early period, featuring a combination of punk rock and reggae influences. The song lyrics were written by Vučetić whereas the music was composed by the entire band. The record release provided the band with a cult status, with almost no media appearances, so that their live appearances in Belgrade were well visited. During the same year, director Miloš Stojanović made a TV film about the band, Darkwood Dub recorded music for the omnibus film Package Arrangement, for the story Mačo trip (Macho Trip), and appeared in the film Geto (Ghetto), directed by Mladen Matičević and Ivan Markov.

In May 1996 the band released their second album, U nedogled (Into the Indefinite), produced by the band themselves and released by B92 Records. The album featured vocal versions of the tracks recorded for Package Arrangement. Plejboj member Dušan Petrović appeared as guest on the album, playing saxophone and upright bass. Having precisely formed their musical expression, the band got positive reactions from both the critics and the audience. The tracks "Treći Vavilon" ("The Third Babylon"), "Imamo situaciju" ("We Have a Situation"), "Hej! Gringo" ("Hey! Gringo") and the title track were widely praised. On this album the band introduced sampling in their work, with some of the tracks featuring samples from Aswad and Lee Scratch Perry songs. The album was pronounced the album of the year 1996 by a number of the Serbian music critics, and after the album release, for the first time, the band went on a promotional tour.

In 1997 the band recorded music for the play Trainspotting, based on the Irvine Welsh novel of the same name, performed at the BITEF theatre and directed by Đorđe Marjanović. The recorded material was released on the album entitled simply Darkwood Dub, which also featured five remixes made by Chiq Toxiq, Velja Mijanović and Boris Krstajić. The tracks like "Sila" ("Force"), "Strategija bumerang" ("Boomerang Strategy") and "Sistem" ("System") featured the band experimenting with dub and drum and bass.

=== Mainstream years (1999–2017) ===
The release of the album Elektropionir (Electropioneer), recorded at the Belgrade Akademija studio from September 1998 until February 1999, was prevented by the 1999 NATO bombing of Yugoslavia and it was not until September of the same year that the album was released. The album was co-produced by the band themselves and Aleksandar Radosavljević. It featured guest appearances by Ana Žunić (backing vocals), Filip Krumes (violin, viola), Vasil Hadžimanov (keyboards), Dušan Petrović (saxophone) and Nemanja Kojić "Kojot" (trombone). The album presented the band to a wider audience, making it a mainstream act, and the success was noted on numerous live appearances on their two-year tour in former Yugoslav republics, including the performance at the first Novi Sad EXIT festival in 2000. In 2001 the band participated in the project organized by a former Bjesovi vocalist Goran Marić, Pesme iznad istoka i zapada (Songs above the East and West), featuring various Serbian rock bands composing music to the poems and prayers written by Bishop Nikolaj Velimirović, with the track "Molitva Blagom Hristu" ("A Prayer to the Mild Christ"). In 2001 a remix of the band's song "Zapremina" ("Bulk") appeared in the Dudes! original soundtrack, released by B92.

In 2002 the band released their fifth studio album, Život počinje u 30-oj (Life Begins at 30), produced by Saša Janković and featuring guest appearance by Presing vocalist Zoran Radović "Kiza". Život počinje u 30-oj was pronounced one of the best albums of the year by the webzine Popboks critics. During the year the band also recorded the soundtrack for the film Ogledalo (Mirror), directed by Dejan Kovačević. The following year, the album U nedogled was remastered and reissued on CD, featuring bonus material consisting of the track "Smak" ("The End of the World") and demo version of the track "Filadelfija" ("Philadelphia"). During the same year, the band also participated in the Milan Mladenović tribute album Kao da je bilo nekad... (Posvećeno Milanu Mladenoviću) (As if It Had Happened Sometime... (Dedicated to Milan Mladenović)) with the track "Geto" ("Ghetto") originally released on the album Katarina II.

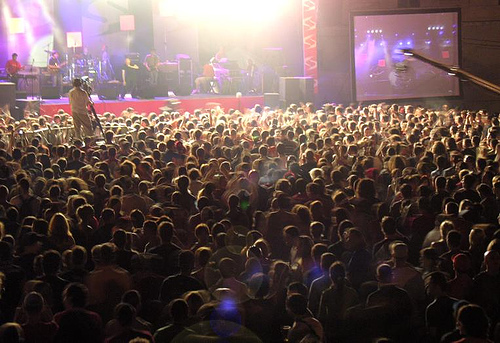
Darkwood Dub performing at the 2006 EXIT Festival

Their sixth studio album, O danima (About the Days), produced by the band themselves and released in 2004, featured nine tracks, including "Laka radost" ("Easy Joy") and the title track for which as guest vocalist appeared Veliki Prezir vocalist Vladimir Kolarić "Kole", and the track "Centrala" ("Central Station"), featuring Lira Vega member Vladimir Đorđević on lead vocals. The album was recorded under the work title Melos, but was eventually renamed due to the usage of the phrase in turbo folk music. During the same year, the band performed live in the play Rat/Sećanja (War/Memories), co-directed by Đorđe Marjanović and Indonesian writer Putu Wijaya and performed in Atelje 212 theatre. In 2006 the band performed as the opening act for Morrissey on his concert in Zagreb.

In 2008 the band released the album Jedinstvo (Unity). The guitarist Vladimir Jerić had left the band prior to the album release, and after the album release the vacant spot was filled with a keyboard player, Vasil Hadžimanov, who had already gained prominence as a jazz musician. At the end of the year the track "Ženeva" ("Geneva") was voted the sixth most popular single in 2008 at B92 and the fifth at the same list on Studio B. In 2009 Darkwood Dub was nominated for the best MTV Adria regional act at the MTV European Awards. During the same year, on the webzine Popboks annual lists, the single from Jedinstvo "Šećer" ("Sugar") was voted the tenth most popular single in 2009 and the music video for the track "Robot" appeared at the sixth place at the Music Video of the Year Award. The track "130" appeared on the first place of the Jelen Top 10 list for two weeks in March 2010.

In April 2011, the band released the song "Nešto sasvim izvesno" ("Something Quite for Certain"), featuring the famous Serbian jazz singer Bisera Veletanlić, for free digital download through the Exit Music online record label. The single was announcing their eight studio album. In June of the same year the band released yet another single promoting the upcoming studio release, "Kraj oktobra" ("The End of October"). In July the band released their eight studio album, Vidimo se (See You) for free digital download thorough Exit Music, as well as on compact disc through Odličan Hrčak. The compact disc edition featured two songs not included on the download edition, the album title track and the song "Tama" ("Darkness"). In autumn of 2012 Darkwood Dub and Bisera Veletanlić started a tour across Serbia, with performance at the Belgrade Jazz Festival as the first one. Just before the beginning of the tour, the band and Veletlanić released new versions of Veletanlić's old hit "Milo moje" ("My Dear") and "Ručak za dvoje" ("Lunch for Two"), originally released as the B-side for "Milo moje" single. The concerts on the tour were performed mostly in theaters and similar venues. In 2013 Hadžimanov left the band and Darkwood Dub continued as a quartet.

In the summer of 2014 Ristić stated that the band is working on a new studio album. However, Darkwood Dub ended their activity in 2017 due to lasting disagreements within the band.

=== Post breakup ===
After the band ended their activity, Bojan Drobac and Milorad Ristić continued their career working under the name Bella Technika (a pun on beautiful technique and bela tehnika, lit. white tech). They recorded their debut album, entitled Section, with opera singer Katarina Jovanović, releasing it in 2016. Dejan Vučetić continued his career in the band Minilinija (Mini Stereo System), which evolved from Vučetić's and Ristić's side project Teget (Navy Blue).

== Legacy ==
In 2021, the album Elektropionir was polled 9th, the album Darkwood Dub was polled 21st, the album Život počinje u 30-oj was polled 42nd and the album Paramparčad was polled 79th on the list of 100 Best Serbian Albums Since the Breakup of SFR Yugoslavia. The list was published in the book Kako (ni)je propao rokenrol u Srbiji (How Rock 'n' Roll in Serbia (Didn't) Came to an End).

In 2006, the song "Kolotečina" ("The Rut") was ranked No. 33, and the song "Treći Vavilon" was ranked No. 35 on the B92 Top 100 Domestic Songs list.

The "Zapremina tela" lyrics were featured in Petar Janjatović's book Pesme bratstva, detinjstva & potomstva: Antologija ex YU rok poezije 1967 - 2007 (Songs of Brotherhood, Childhood & Progeny: Anthology of Ex YU Rock Poetry 1967 - 2007).

Based on Darkwood Dub song "Usamljeni hašišar" ("The Lonesome Hashish Eater"), which appeared on the band's debut, Đorđe Marjanović and Nikola Majdak Junior recorded an animated movie of the same name, which got the Yugoslav ASIFA reward for animation.

== Discography ==
=== Studio albums ===
- Paramparčad (1995)
- U nedogled (1996)
- Darkwood Dub (1997)
- Elektropionir (1999)
- Život počinje u 30-oj (2002)
- O danima (2004)
- Jedinstvo (2008)
- Vidimo se (2011)

=== Singles ===
- "Kraj oktobra" (2011)
- "Nešto sasvim izvesno" (2011)
- "Milo moje" / "Ručak za dvoje" (with Bisera Veletanlić; 2012)

=== Other appearances ===
- "Srećna glava" / "Veliki duh" (Želim jahati do ekstaze; 1991)
- "Ptice" (Academia vol.1; 1993)
- "Molitva Blagom Hristu" (Pesme iznad istoka i zapada; 2001)
- "Zapremina (WS Remix)" (Muzika iz filma Munje!; 2001)
- "Geto" (Kao da je bilo nekad... (Posvećeno Milanu Mladenoviću); 2002)
- "Ja te potpuno razumem" (Groovanje devedesete uživo; 2009)

== Awards and nominations ==
Year	Award	Category	Result
2009	MTV Europe Music Awards	Best Adriatic Act	Nominated
