= Pekinška Patka discography =

- Studio albums: 2
- Compilation albums: 1
- Singles: 4

The discography of Serbian and Yugoslav punk rock and post-punk band Pekinška Patka comprises two studio albums, four singles, and one compilation album.

The band had their first recordings released on the double A-side single "Biti ružan, pametan i mlad" / "Bela šljiva" ("To Be Ugly, Smart and Young" / "White Plum") in 1979, by Jugoton. The single was the first Serbian punk rock release. The band's debut album, Plitka poezija (Shallow Poetry), released in 1980, is considered the first punk rock album by a Serbian act. The album was ushered by the single "Bolje da nosim kratku kosu" ("I Better Wear Short Hair"), and after the single release, the band's default lineup changed, which influenced the further musical development of the band. The new lineup firstly released the single "Bila je tako lijepa" ("She Was So Beautiful"), and then moved towards post-punk, with the release of the band's second and final album Strah od monotonije (Fear Of Monotony). After the album release, the band split up. All of the band's recordings, released on albums and singles, appeared on the Pekinška Patka compilation album in 2006. Following the band's 2010 reunion, they released the single "Un año de amor (Pain Version)".

== Studio albums ==
Year	Album details
1980	Plitka poezija: Released: 1980; Label: Jugoton; Format: LP, CS, CD
1981	Strah od monotonije: Released: 1981; Label: Jugoton; Format: LP, CS, CD

== Compilation albums ==
Year	Album details
2006	Pekinška Patka: Released: 2006; Label: Multimedia Records; Format: CD

== Singles ==
Year	Single details
1979	"Biti ružan, pametan i mlad" / "Bela šljiva": From the album: Plitka poezija; Released: 1979; Label: Jugoton; Format: 7"; Note: Double A-side single
1980	"Bolje da nosim kratku kosu": B-side: "Ori, ori"; From the album: Plitka poezija; Released: 1980; Label: Jugoton; Format: 7"
1980	"Bila je tako lijepa": B-side: "Bumba, rumba"; From the album: Non-album single; Released: 1980; Label: Jugoton; Format: 7"
2010	"Un año de amor (Pain Version)": From the album: Non-album single; Released: 2010; Label: Long Play; Format: CD
