= Pekinška Patka (album) =

Pekinška patka

Compilation album by Pekinška Patka
- Released: 2006
- Recorded: 1979–1981
- Genre: Punk rock; new wave; post-punk; dark wave
- Length: 76:35
- Label: Multimedia Records
- Producer: Slobodan Konjović

Pekinška Patka chronology
Strah od monotonije (1981)	Pekinška patka (2006)

Professional ratings
Review scores
Source	Rating
Barikada	favorable
Popboks	favorable
Plastelin	favorable

Pekinška Patka is a self-titled compilation album by Serbian and Yugoslav punk rock/post-punk band Pekinška Patka, released in 2006. The compilation features remastered versions of all of the band's releases, including all tracks from both of their studio albums, Plitka poezija and Strah od monotonije, as well as all of their 7-inch singles.

== Track listing ==
No.	Title	Length
1.	"Poderimo rock" ("Let's Tear Rock Apart")	1:57
2.	"Homburg" (Procol Harum cover)	2:13
3.	"Bolje da nosim kratku kosu" ("I Better Wear Short Hair")	2:30
4.	"Stop Stop" (The Hollies cover)	2:10
5.	"Biti ružan, pametan i mlad" ("To Be Ugly, Smart and Young")	1:59
6.	"Ori, ori" ("Plow, Plow")	1:56
7.	"Skakadak"	2:16
8.	"Kratkovidi magarac" ("Shortsighted Donkey")	1:24
9.	"Bela šljiva" ("White Plum")	1:56
10.	"Ja sam panker u sakou starom" ("I'm a Punk Rocker in an Old Coat")	1:24
11.	"Kontracepcija" ("Contraception")	1:46
12.	"Šta je zbližilo nas" ("What Made Us Closer")	1:35
13.	"Gledaj, ja sam svoj" ("Look, I Am My Own")	2:42
14.	"Never My Love" (Addrisi Brothers cover)	2:12
15.	"Ljubav" ("Love")	2:18
16.	"Za Yoko Ono" ("For Yoko Ono")	1:59
17.	"Bila je tako lijepa" (Dragan Stojnić cover)	3:24
18.	"Bumba, rumba"	2:24
19.	"Strah" ("Fear")	2:47
20.	"Krug" ("Circle")	3:51
21.	"Lica (The Watcher)" ("Faces (The Watcher)")	5:30
22.	"Sive eminencije" ("Gray Eminences")	3:59
23.	"Sive eminencije 2"	1:07
24.	"Monotonija" ("Monotony")	6:02
25.	"Neko" ("Someone")	1:55
26.	"Apatija" ("Apathy")	7:53

== Notes ==
- Tracks 1–16 are from Plitka poezija.
- Tracks 17–18 are from the single "Bila je tako lijepa" / "Bumba, rumba".
- Tracks 19–26 are from Strah od monotonije.

== Personnel ==
- Nebojša Čonkić - vocals (tracks: 1–26)
- Sreten Kovačević - guitar, backing vocals (tracks: 1–16)
- Boris Oslovčan - bass guitar, backing vocals (tracks: 1–16)
- Laslo Pihler - drums, backing vocals (tracks: 1–26)
- Marinko Vukmanović - bass guitar, voice, backing vocals (tracks: 17–26)
- Zoran Bulatović - guitar, keyboards, backing vocals (tracks: 17–26)

=== Additional personnel ===
- Slobodan Konjović - production (tracks: 1–26)
