= Strah od monotonije =

Studio album by Pekinška Patka
- Released: 1981
- Recorded: March 1981
- Studio: Vem studio, Belgrade
- Genre: New wave; post-punk; dark wave
- Length: 33:04
- Label: Jugoton; LSY 63100
- Producer: Slobodan Konjović

Pekinška Patka chronology
Plitka poezija (1980)	Strah od monotonije (1981)	Pekinška Patka (2006)

Strah od monotonije (trans. Fear of Monotony) is the second and last studio album by Serbian and Yugoslav band Pekinška Patka, released in 1981. Unlike its predecessor, punk rock album Plitka poezija (Shallow Poetry), Strah od monotonije featured post-punk and dark wave sound. It was met with lukewarm reactions of the public, and the group disbanded soon after its release. It would remain the band's last studio release until their 2010 reunion and the release of the single "Un año de amor (Pain Version)".

== Background and recording ==
Following the release of their 1980 punk rock debut Plitka poezija and mainstream popularity owed to the singles "Biti ružan, pametan i mlad" and "Bolje da nosim kratku kosu", the band underwent personnel changes. Guitarist Sreten "Sreta" Kovačević expressed a desire to play saxophone, so he moved to that instrument, with Zoran "Bale" Bulatović, a 17-year-old former member of Pečat (Stamp), taking over the vacated guitar spot. Bass guitarist Boris Oslovčan left the band, and was eventually, after several concerts with different bass guitarists, replaced by another former Pečat member, Marinko Vukmanović. That lineup did not last long, as Kovačević left during fall of 1980 to join the two-tone/ska group Kontraritam, leaving vocalist Nebojša Čonkić and drummer Laslo Pihler as the only two remaining original members of the band.

After releasing the single "Bila je tako lijepa" ("She Was So Pretty"), a punk rock cover of a popular chanson by Dragan Stojnić, in the fall of 1980, the band started preparing new studio material inspired by Joy Division, The Stranglers, The Cure, Magazine and Echo & The Bunnymen. The band originally wrote English language lyrics for the songs, but were eventually pressured by their record label Jugoton to write Serbo-Croatian lyrics. Strah od monotonije was recorded during March 1981 in Belgrade studio Vem and was, as the band's debut, produced by Slobodan Konjović.

== Track listing ==
Side A
No.	Title	Writer(s)	Length
1.	"Strah" ("Fear")	Marinko Vukmanović; Zoran Bulatović	2:47
2.	"Krug" ("Circle")	Marinko Vukmanović; Zoran Bulatović	3:51
3.	"Lica (The Watcher)" ("Faces (The Watcher)")	Marinko Vukmanović; Nebojša Čonkić; Zoran Bulatović	5:30
4.	"Sive eminencije" ("Gray Eminences")	Marinko Vukmanović; Nebojša Čonkić; Zoran Bulatović	3:59
5.	"Sive eminencije II"	Nebojša Čonkić; Zoran Bulatović; Slobodan Konjović	1:07

Side B
No.	Title	Writer(s)	Length
1.	"Monotonija" ("Monotony")	Nebojša Čonkić	6:02
2.	"Neko" ("Someone")	Marinko Vukmanović; Zoran Bulatović	1:55
3.	"Apatija" ("Apathy")	Nebojša Čonkić	7:53

== Reception and Pekinška Patka disbandment ==
The album was released in May 1981. The band's shift to post-punk and dark wave sound, followed by the change of their image, mostly failed to connect with the audiences in the way their debut album and initial style did. On the concert's that followed album release, the audience showed lack of interest for the band's new sound, demanding to hear songs from the first album. The band held their last concert in June 1981 at Rokoteka club in Belgrade's Kalemegdan park. During the summer of 1981, Čonkić went to serve his Yugoslav People's Army mandatory stint, the group thus ending their activity. By the time he returned home a year later, Bulatović, Vukmanović and Pihler had already formed post-punk band Luna with vocalist Slobodan Tišma.

Strah od monotonije would remain the band's last studio release until their 2010 reunion and the release of the single "Un año de amor (Pain Version)".

== Personnel ==
- Nebojša Čonkić - vocals
- Marinko Vukmanović - bass guitar, voice, backing vocals
- Laslo Pihler - drums
- Zoran Bulatović - guitar, keyboards, backing vocals

=== Additional personnel ===
- Slobodan Konjović - producer, recorded by
- Geza Lenert - photography
