= Kontraritam (album) =

Studio album by Kontraritam
- Released: 1982
- Recorded: January 1982
- Studio: Meta Sound studio, Novi Sad
- Genre: New wave; ska; 2 tone; reggae
- Length: 30:41
- Label: Jugoton; LSY 61671
- Producer: Sreten Kovačević

Kontraritam (The Counterrhythm) is the debut and only studio album by Yugoslav new wave/ska band Kontraritam, released in 1982.

== Background and recording ==
Formed in Novi Sad in 1980, the band soon attracted the attention of the country's public and media. In the spring of 1981, in Radio Novi Sad studios, the band recorded several songs with the help of producer Aleksandar Pražić, the recordings providing the media presentation of the group. Soon after, the band signed a contract with the Belgrade-based Beograd Disk record label, but as the label did not manage to schedule recording sessions for the band in the company's studio, the group signed with the Zagreb-based Jugoton. The band recorded their debut album in Novi Sad's Meta Sound studio during January 1982, with the band's guitarist and saxophonist Sreten "Sreta" Kovačević producing the album. The album cover art concept was designed by musician and artist Goran Vejvoda, and the lettering was done by pianist Margita Stefanović, who would soon gain fame as the keyboardist for Ekatarina Velika.

== Tracklisting ==
All tracks written by Kontraritam

Side A
No.	Title	Length
1.	"Sretne noge" ("Happy Legs")	2:39
2.	"Drugačija" ("Different One")	2:20
3.	"Obojeni grad" ("Colored City")	2:08
4.	"Bruce Lee" ("Bruce Lee")	2:16
5.	"? (Pesma bez imena)" ("? (Untitled Song)")	3:58
6.	"Miss Ska-Kulation" ("Miss Ska-Culation")	2:25

Side B
No.	Title	Length
1.	"Žožo, vrati se" ("Žoža, Come Back")	3:00
2.	"Dečaci" ("Boys")	2:25
3.	"Slobodna devojka" ("Free Girl")	2:10
4.	"Oko i duh" ("The Eye and the Spirit")	4:55
5.	"Predstava" ("Show")	2:25

== Personnel ==
- Jan Pavlov — vocals, organ
- Sreten Kovačević — guitar, alto saxophone, backing vocals, producer
- Horvat Žolt — guitar
- Dimitrije Radulović — bass guitar, backing vocals
- Boris Oslovčan — bass guitar
- Robert Radić — drums

=== Additional pesronnel ===
- Ivan Vlatković — recorded by
- Goran Vejvoda - design concept
- Srđan Vejvoda - photography
- Margita Stefanović - lettering

== Album reception and aftermath ==
The album track "Srećne noge" became a hit for the band, appearing on the third place of Studio B Diskomer top ten list. The song "Žožo, vrati se" ("Žoža, Come Back") appeared on the prominent Jugoton 1982 various artists compilation album Vrući dani i vrele noći (Hot Days and Hot Nights).

Following Kontraritam release, the band, despite good reception of the album and frequent live and media appearances, went through several lineup changes, caused by the members' mandatory stints in the Yugoslav People's Army. When the band's guitarist Sreten Kovačević went to serve the army in the spring of 1983, the band ended their activity.

The song "Sretne noge", "Slobodna devojka" and "Drugačija" are the only Kontraritam songs to be released on CD, appearing on different compilations and box sets. The album was never re-released in CD format.
