= Vrući dani i vrele noći =

Compilation album by Various Artists
- Released: June 24, 1982
- Genre: New wave, rock, pop
- Label: Jugoton

Vrući dani i vrele noći (meaning in Serbo-Croat: Hot days and scorching nights) is a compilation album released by Jugoton in 1982 in the former SFR Yugoslavia.

It included eminent former Yugoslav pop and rock artists, mostly from the new wave scene in Yugoslavia. The record featured the then-new wave music bands Električni orgazam with the punk rock-sounding track "Dokolica"; Idoli with "Kenozoik"; Azra's "Put za Katmandu"; Film's "Zona sumraka"; the ska and reggae oriented Haustor with "Radio"; Laboratorija zvuka with the retro-inspired "Zaboravljena draga"; Animatori with "Male curice"; Zana's single "On"; the new wave power pop sounding bands Stidljiva ljubičica and Xenia with "Osvrni se na mene" and "Povezi me" respectively; "Žožo, vrati se" by the Novi Sad based Ska group Kontraritam featuring Sreta Kovačević, the former guitarist of the punk legends Pekinška patka; the ex-Prljavo Kazalište member Zoran Cvetković's act ZOK with "Zaboravi"; "Zatvaram oči" by the new romantic-inspired La Fortunjeros feat. Saša Zalepugin (later a member of Plavi Orkestar); "Ona se smije" by Izazov, which included former members of some older 1970s rock groups such as Time, Grupa 220 and Hobo; Aerodrom with "Kad je sa mnom kvari sve", and the synthpop group Beograd with the song "TV".

== Record cover ==
The record sleeve features covers of the albums, which included the tracks selected for the compilation (counter-clockwise, starting from the top left angle): "Odbrana i poslednji dani" by Idoli; the self-titled album of Izazov; Azra's "Filigranski pločnici"; "Duboko u tebi" by Laboratorija zvuka; Haustor's self-titled debut; Kontraritam's album; Zana's "Loše vesti uz rege za pivsku flašu"; "Obične ljubavne pjesme" by Aerodrom; Film's "Zona sumraka", and the album cover of ZOK.

The other side of the sleeve is same, but it features the names of the artists and titles of the songs.

The upper middle field of the sleeve includes the record covers of the singles included in the compilation, while the table below features: a lipstick, a bottle of Coca-Cola, sunglasses, earphones and a copy of the legendary ex-Yugoslav music magazine Džuboks with Adam Ant on its front cover.

== Track listing ==
1. Azra - "Put za Katmandu"
2. Idoli - "Kenozoik"
3. Stidljiva ljubicica - "Osvrni se na mene"
4. Zana - "On"
5. Izazov - "Ona se smije"
6. Zok - "Zaboravi"
7. Animatori - "Male curice"
8. Laboratorija zvuka - "Zaboravljena draga"
9. Film - "Zona sumraka"
10. Xenia - "Povezi me"
11. Aerodrom - "Kad je sa mnom kvari sve"
12. Električni Orgazam - "Dokolica"
13. La Fortunjeros - "Zatvaram oci"
14. Kontraritam - "Žožo, vrati se"
15. Haustor - "Radio"
16. Beograd - "TV"

== See also ==
- Paket aranžman
- Artistička radna akcija
- Novi Punk Val
- Svi marš na ples!
- New wave music in Yugoslavia
- Popular music in the Socialist Federal Republic of Yugoslavia
- Jugoton
