= Ja eventualno bih ako njega eliminišete =

Studio album by Atheist Rap
- Released: 1995; 1998 (reissue)
- Recorded: July – August 1995; M and Radio Novi Sad studios, Novi Sad
- Genre: Punk rock, hardcore punk, pop punk, comedy rock
- Length: 38:52; 42:51 (reissue)
- Label: PGP-RTS, Hi-Fi Centar (reissue)
- Producer: Atheist Rap, Vojislav Aralica

Atheist Rap chronology
Maori i Crni Gonzales (1993)	Ja eventualno bih ako njega eliminišete (1995)	II liga zapad (1998)

Alternative cover
- The 1998 reissue cover

Ja eventualno bih ako njega eliminišete is the second studio album by the Serbian punk rock band Atheist Rap, released by PGP-RTS in 1995. The album, previously available only on compact cassette, was re-released by Hi-Fi Centar, featuring bonus material. The album title is an acronym for "jebanje" ("fucking")

== Track listing ==
Music and lyrics by Atheist Rap plus The Clash, The Ruts, Beastie Boys, Soundgarden, NOFX, Dead Kennedys, KUD Idijoti, Ekatarina Velika, Neki Italijan, Mighty Mighty Bosstones, Kićo Slabinac, Zlatko M, Die Toten Hosen, Nomeansno, Dinosaur Jr, Pekinška Patka, Prljavo Kazalište, Dane, Slavko Matić, Kiki Glumac, Želimir Žilnik & Dika Manadžer. This album did not feature any samplers, nor any other digital audio sound sources.

No.	Title	Length
1.	"Radio drama: drama u radiju" (Radio Drama: Drama On The Radio)	1:35
2.	"Godina kulture" (Culture Year)	3:10
3.	"Odlazim" (I Am Leaving)	2:52
4.	"Car Core"	4:39
5.	"Novosacki Vašar" (Novi Sad Fair)	3:17
6.	"Grill 13"	4:14
7.	"Rokvić Radivoje"	3:03
8.	"Fatamorgana" (Mirage)	3:00
9.	"Rumba Argentino"	0:34
10.	"Ja sam video video" (I Have Seen Video)	2:08
11.	"Tetoviranje" (Tattoo)	2:35
12.	"Reč Dve O Biznisu" (A Few Words On Business)	1:21
13.	"Felićita" (Congratulation)	2:03
14.	"Pećinko / Who's In The House?"	4:25

=== 1998 reissue track listing ===
No.	Title	Length
1.	"Radio drama: drama u radiju" (Radio Drama: Drama On The Radio)	1:36
2.	"Godina kulture" (Culture Year)	3:12
3.	"Odlazim" (I Am Leaving)	2:54
4.	"Car Core"	4:42
5.	"Novosacki Vašar" (Novi Sad Fair)	3:20
6.	"Rumba Argentino"	0:37
7.	"Ja sam video video" (I Have Seen Video)	2:10
8.	"Grill 13"	4:18
9.	"Snayka" (Daughter-in-law)	3:54
10.	"Rokić Radivoje: Sve je stvar kompromisa" (Rokić Radivoje: It Is All About Compromise)	3:06
11.	"Fatamorgana" (Mirage)	2:59
12.	"Tetoviranje" (Tattoo)	2:38
13.	"Reč Dve O Biznisu" (A Few Words On Business)	1:28
14.	"Felićita" (Congratulation)	2:02
15.	"Pećinko / Who's In The House?"	4:25

== Personnel ==
=== Atheist Rap ===
- Zare (Zoran Zarić; bass)
- Acke (Aleksandar Milovanov; drums)
- Goja (Stevan Gojkov; guitar)
- Radule (Vladimir Radusinović; guitar, vocals)
- Dr. Pop (Aleksandar Popov; vocals)
- Pećinko (Vladimir Kozbašić; vocals)

=== Additional personnel ===
- Atheist Rape: Marina, Zgro, Mali Ljuba, Brle, Baklaja, Stole, Adam, Majkić, Vijetnamac, Gaca, Sloba, Mirko, Rista, Bardun, Ivica Drobac, Darko Lažni Vladi, Mahariši Maheš Jogi, Jode, Dragaš, Erić.
- Atheist Rave: DJ Z
- Petar Ristić (executive producer)
- Darko Varga (mixed by [assistant])
- Vojislav Aralica (producer, mixed by)
- Jan Šaš (recorded by, mixed by)
