= Predsednici Predsedništva Predsednika =

Greatest hits album by Atheist Rap
- Released: 2001
- Recorded: 1991–2001
- Genre: Punk rock, hardcore punk, pop punk, comedy rock
- Length: 71:55
- Label: Hi-Fi Centar

Predsednici Predsedništva Predsednika is a greatest hits album by the Serbian punk rock band Atheist Rap, released by Hi-Fi Centar in 2001.

== Track listing ==
No.	Title	Length
1.	"Car Core"	4:17
2.	"Letnji hit" (Summer Hit)	3:22
3.	"Ora je..." (YWA Is...)	4:15
4.	"NS Vašar" (Novi Sad Fair)	3:20
5.	"Štrikanje" (Knitting)	3:20
6.	"Radio drama: Drama u radiju" (Radio Drama: Drama On The Radio)	1:36
7.	"Godina kulture" (Culture Year)	3:13
8.	"...motka... ojavljujem" (... Switch... Switching Off)	0:08
9.	"Dr Pop"	3:50
10.	"Pećinko"	2:47
11.	"U zmajevom gnezdu" (In A Dragon's Nest)	2:44
12.	"Rokvić Radivoje: Sve je stvar kompromisa" (Rokvić Radivoje: It's All About Compromise)	3:05
13.	"Piloti" (Pilots)	1:20
14.	"Reč dve o biznisu" (A Few Words On Business)	1:24
15.	"Blu Trabant" (Blue Trabant)	4:37
16.	"Wartburg limuzina" (Wartburg limousine)	4:16
17.	"Hor / Atheist Rap II" (Choir / Atheist Rap 2)	1:532
18.	"Odlazim" (I Am Leaving)	2:54
19.	"Stvar za živi album" (A Live Album Thing)	3:25
20.	"Fatamorgana" (Mirage)	2:59
21.	"Felićita" (Congratulation)	2:00
22.	"Džaba smo sedeli" (We've Been Sitting For Nothing)	0:55
23.	"Grill 13"	4:13
24.	"Lopovi i žace" (Thiefs And Jacks)	2:40
25.	"Sarajevo" (Sarajevo)	3:08
