= Kontraritam =

- Origin: Novi Sad, SR Serbia, SFR Yugoslavia
- Genres: New wave; ska; 2 tone; reggae
- Years active: 1980–1983
- Labels: Jugoton
- Past members: Jan Pavlov; Dimitrije Radulović; Žolt Horvat; Robert Radić; Sreten Kovačević; Boris Oslovčan; Ivan Fece; Predrag Janičić

Kontraritam (Serbian Cyrillic: Контраритам; trans. Counterrhythm) was a Yugoslav new wave/ska band formed in Novi Sad in 1980. Despite being short-lived and releasing only one album, their 1982 eponymous debut, the group was a prominent act of the Yugoslav new wave scene.

== History ==
=== 1980–1983 ===
The band was formed in autumn of 1980 by Jan Pavlov (vocals, keyboards), Dimitrije "Mita" Radulović (vocals, bass guitar), Žolt Horvat (guitar) and Robert "Robi" Radić (drums), all four former members of the punk rock band Gomila G (censored version of their original name Gomila Govana, Pile of Shit). They were soon joined by guitarist Sreten "Sreta" Kovačević, who left his former band Pekinška Patka after the release of their 1980 debut album Plitka poezija. Beside playing guitar, Kovačević played saxophone, which he took up playing only a few months before joining Kontraritam. After a few club appearances, the band managed to appear on the prominent Youth Festival in Subotica. Even though they did not win the festival, their appearance got positive reactions from the audience and the music press.

In December 1980, the band appeared at the Grok Festival, held at the Novi Sad Fair. During the following months, they performed as an opening act for Haustor, Prljavo Kazalište and Idoli. In the spring of 1981, in Radio Novi Sad studios, the band recorded several songs with the help of producer Aleksandar Pražić, the recordings providing the media presentation of the group. In 1981, after the performance at the Hipodrom '81. festival in Belgrade, Radulović went to serve his mandatory stint in the Yugoslav People's Army, and was replaced by Boris "Bora" Oslovčan, Kovačević's former Pekinška Patka bandmate.

Soon after, the band signed a contract with the Belgrade-based Beograd Disk record label, but as the label did not manage to schedule recording sessions for the band in the company's studio, the group signed with the Zagreb-based Jugoton. The band's debut album, named Kontraritam, was recorded in Novi Sad's Meta Sound studio and featured the recordings of both Radulović and Oslovčan on bass. The album cover art concept was designed by musician and artist Goran Vejvoda. The song "Sretne noge" ("Happy Legs") became a hit for the band, appearing on the third place of Studio B Diskomer top ten list, and the song "Žožo, vrati se" ("Žoža, Come Back") appeared on the prominent 1982 various artists compilation album Vrući dani i vrele noći (Hot Days and Hot Nights).

In the meantime, due to mandatory army stints of the members, the band changed several lineups, but still managed to frequently perform live, also having frequent appearances in Yugoslav media. In September 1981, they held a well-received concert with Obojeni Program and Grad at Belgrade's Dadov Theatre. During early 1982, they performed with Luna drummer Ivan Fece "Firchie" playing as the new guitarist. The last lineup of the band, featuring Kovačević, Pavlov, Radulović and the drummer Predrag "Buca" Janičić, the latter formerly of the band Fotomodel (Photo Model), performed in local clubs from late 1982 until the spring of 1983, when Kovačević went to serve the army and the band split up.

=== Post-breakup ===
Horvat moved to Germany, and Pavlov moved to Canada. Oslovčan moved to Russia, working as a chef in a restaurant in Moscow. Radić played with La Strada and Love Hunters, eventually becoming a member of Veliki Prezir. From 2010 to 2012, he played with reunited Pekinška Patka, as the replacement for the band's original drummer Laslo Pihler, who was unable to perform due to health issues. Radulović worked in Elektrovojvodina electric utility power company, and Kovačević formed his own company Audiokonstruktor. In 2008, Kovačević and Oslovčan performed a reunion show with their former band Pekinška Patka at the Exit festival.

In 1994, the song "Sretne noge" appeared on the various artists compilation Niko kao ja: Jugoslovenski novi talas (No One like Me: Yugoslav New Wave). The same song appeared in 2021 on Croatia Records six-piece box set Novi Talas / Val (New Wave). In 2023, the band's song "Slobodna devojka" ("Free Girl") appeared on the seven-piece box set 60 godina Festivala Omladina (60 Years of Youth Festival), and in 2024 their song "Drugačija" ("Different One") appeared on the compilation album Novosadska rok kultura – Novi talas 1981-82. (Novi Sad Rock Culture – New Wave 1981-82), released by Novi Sad Students' Cultural Center. These are the only three Kontraritam songs released in compact disc format, as the self-titled album was never re-released on CD.

== Discography ==
=== Studio albums ===
- Kontraritam (1982)

== See also ==
- New wave music in Yugoslavia
