= Osveta Crnog Gonzalesa =

Studio album by Atheist Rap
- Released: 2005
- Recorded: May 1 – November 29, 2004; Socijala studios, Novi Sad
- Genre: Punk rock, hardcore punk, pop punk, comedy rock
- Length: 46:35
- Label: Multimedia Records
- Producer: Max Power, Pedericco Rashiid

Atheist Rap chronology
II liga zapad (1998)	Osveta Crnog Gonzalesa (2005)	Priče matorih pokvarenjaka (2009)

Professional ratings
Review scores
Source	Rating
Barikada	link
Muzika.hr	link
Popboks	link
Terapija.net	link

Osveta Crnog Gonzalesa is the fourth album by the Serbian punk rock band Atheist Rap, released by Multimedia Records in 2005.

== Track listing ==
No.	Title	Length
1.	"Pritilend" (Prettyland)	3:18
2.	"Igraš Grubo" (You Are Playing Roughly)	3:26
3.	"Elit luk & voda" (Elite Look & Water)	3:38
4.	"Revanšizam" (Revanchism)	2:19
5.	"Nivo (podnivo 1)" (Level (Sublevel 1))	1:43
6.	"Kriminalna stvar" (A Crimminal Thing)	3:50
7.	"Lopovi & žace" (Thiefs & Jacks)	2:36
8.	"Bojbing" (Boybing)	2:23
9.	"Delfin" (Dolphin)	3:29
10.	"Palija"	3:28
11.	"Dve žetve godišnje" (Two Harvests A Year)	4:31
12.	"Doppler dub"	0:40
13.	"Blues južne pruge" (Southern Railway Blues)	5:04
14.	"Hidden track"	6:00

== Personnel ==
- Leki (Zoran Lekić; bass, backing vocals, acoustic guitar)
- Atzke (Aleksandar Milovanov; drums)
- Dulles (Dušan Ječmenica; guitar)
- Radule (Vladimir Radusinović; guitar, bass vocals)
- Dr. Pop (Aleksandar Popov; vocals)
- Max Power (recorded by, mixed by)
- Pedericco Rashiid (Vladimir Radusinović; mixed by)
