= Bela šljiva =

Single by Pekinška Patka

from the album Plitka poezija
- Released: 19 September 1979
- Recorded: 1979
- Genre: Punk rock
- Length: 1:56
- Label: Jugoton
- Songwriter(s): Nebojša Čonkić, Sreten Kovačević
- Producer(s): Slobodan Konjović

Pekinška Patka singles chronology
""Biti ružan, pametan i mlad" / "Bela šljiva"" (1979)	"Bolje da nosim kratku kosu" (1980)

"Bela šljiva" (trans. "White Plum") is a song by the Serbian and Yugoslav punk rock band Pekinška Patka, released in 1979, appearing on the double A-side single with the song "Biti ružan, pametan i mlad". The songs, considered the first punk rock single by a band coming from SR Serbia, appeared on the band's 1980 debut album Plitka poezija (Shallow Poetry).

== Track listing ==
Both tracks by Nebojša Čonkić and Sreten Kovačević

1. "Biti ružan, pametan i mlad" (1:59)
2. "Bela šljiva" (1:56)

== Personnel ==
- Nebojša Čonkić - vocals
- Sreten Kovačević - guitar
- Boško Prosenica - guitar
- Boris Oslovčan - bass guitar
- Laslo Pihler - drums

== Cover versions ==
- Serbian punk rock band Atheist Rap recorded a cover version of the song as a part of the Pekinška Patka covers medley entitled "Plitka poezija", released on their 1994 debut album Maori i Crni Gonzales (Māori and Black Gonzales).
