= Aleksandar Kravić =

Serbian politician and musician

Aleksandar Kravić (Serbian Cyrillic: Александар Кравић; born 14 January 1958), also known by the stage name Caki, is a politician and musician in Serbia. He was the bassist in Đorđe Balašević's band for several years and subsequently became a prominent member of the League of Social Democrats of Vojvodina (LSV), serving in government at the provincial and municipal levels.

== Early life, private career, and music career ==
Kravić was born in Novi Sad, Serbia. He attended the Svetozar Marković Toza elementary school and the Svetozar Marković secondary school, and learned the guitar at the KUD Svetozar Marković. He is a graduate of the University of Novi Sad Faculty of Law and has worked as a journalist for Radio Television Novi Sad.

He became an established bassist in Novi Sad in the mid-1970s, working with the Kvintet Voje Brkovića and initially playing in a jazz rock style influenced by Miles Davis and John McLaughlin. He was later a member of the prominent punk and new wave groups Laboratorija Zvuka, and Pekinška Patka, performed in Rani Mraz with Đorđe Balašević, and worked with Mitar Subotić and Marina Perazić. He became a full-time member of Balašević's group in 1986 and appeared on all of his albums from Bezdan (1986) to Dnevnik starog momka (2001). During his time with Balašević, he also played in a jazz rock group called California. In a 2017 interview, he identified Jaco Pastorius and Pat Metheny as his favourite musicians.

Kravić has also written music (one of his songs was performed by Arsen Dedić) and sang vocals on his composition "Plavo nebo, zlatno žito" at the 2012 Zlatna tamburica festival.

== Political career ==
Kravić knew Nenad Čanak socially in the 1980s. An opponent of Slobodan Milošević's rule in Serbia, he was a founding member of the LSV under Čanak's leadership in 1990.

The LSV contested the 1996 Serbian local elections as part of the Vojvodina Coalition, and Kravić was elected to the Novi Sad City Assembly under its banner. He took part in negotiations to enter Novi Sad's coalition government in May 1997; these plans did not come to fruition as scheduled when some members of the Zajedno alliance, at the time the leading force in the municipal government, refused to endorse the Vojvodina Coalition in a crucial vote. Kravić described this development as "a totally unexpected bombshell," and members of the Coalition walked out of the assembly in protest.

The Miloŝević government fell in October 2000, in the aftermath of that year's Yugoslavian general election. The LSV participated in this election, and in the concurrent 2000 Vojvodina provincial election, as part of a broad coalition called the Democratic Opposition of Serbia (DOS). This coalition won a landslide victory in the provincial contest with 101 out of 120 seats; Kravić was among the DOS candidates elected, winning in Novi Sad's eighth district. As the new administration took power, it removed many of Milošević's supporters from state institutions; in November 2000, Kravić was appointed as acting director of Radio Television Novi Sad pending the appointment of a permanent replacement. The following month, he argued that the affiliated Radio Television of Serbia (RTS) would need to be decentralized in a manner consistent with a broader strategy of increased regional autonomy. He was nominated for permanent director in late 2001 but was passed over in favour of Petar Jovanović. He later accused the station of returning Milošević-era functionaries to positions of power, further asserting that this was being done deliberately "to either humiliate or destroy Novi Sad TV."

Kravić was a member of Vojvodina's executive committee after the fall of Milošević, serving as its deputy chair until September 2003; after stepping down from this position, he was appointed as deputy chair of the provincial assembly. In May 2001, he introduced a successful amendment to a bill on privatizing state institutions, indicating that the provincial government alone (and not the Serbian government) should have final discretion over such matters. In February 2004, he said that the LSV and Democratic Party had resolved their differences over the wording of a proposed Basic Law of Vojvodina and that the province would proceed with this document even if the Serbian government had not yet completed its revisions of the country's constitution.

Vojvodina's electoral system was changed for the 2004 provincial election, shifting from a first-past-the-post system of single-member constituency seats to a combined system of proportional representation and run-off constituency elections. The DOS alliance had broken down by this time, and the LSV contested the election at the head of a coalition called Together for Vojvodina. Kraviċ sought re-election in Novi Sad's redistributed third district but was defeated. He sought a return to the assembly in Novi Sad constituency seats in the 2008 and 2012 elections but was defeated both times. During the 2012–16 sitting of the assembly, he served as assistant secretary of state for culture and public information in the provincial government, in charge of regional cooperation and projects. Prior to the 2016 election, Vojvodina's constituency seats were abolished and the province adopted a system of pure proportional representation; Kravić appeared on the LSV's electoral list but not in a high enough position to return to the assembly.

Kravić continued to serve in the Novi Sad City Assembly after the fall of Milošević and has been re-elected to several terms in the body. In the 2008–12 sitting of the assembly, he served on city council (i.e., the executive branch of municipal government) with responsibility for youth and sport. He was elected to a new term in the 2016 Serbian local elections and was subsequently re-appointed to city council after the LSV joined a somewhat unusual municipal coalition led by the Serbian Progressive Party and its allies.

Kravić has also been a candidate for election to the National Assembly of Serbia on four occasions, though he has never served in the body. He appeared on the LSV's Together for Tolerance list in the 2003 election; the list did not cross the electoral threshold to win representation in the assembly. The LSV subsequently contested the 2007 election in alliance with the Liberal Democratic Party (LDP), and Kravić received the 107th list position. The list won fifteen mandates, and he was not selected as part of his party's delegation. (From 2000 to 2011, Serbian parliamentary mandates were awarded to sponsoring parties or coalitions rather than to individual candidates, and it was common practice for the mandates to be awarded out of numerical order. Kravić could have been awarded a mandate despite his relatively low position on the list – which was in any event mostly alphabetical – though in fact he was not.) In 2011, Serbia's electoral system was reformed such that mandates were awarded in numerical order to candidates on successful lists. Kravić appeared as a LSV candidates in the 2014 and 2016 elections, but in each instance in too low a position to be returned.

== Electoral record ==
=== Provincial (Vojvodina) ===
2012 Vojvodina assembly election Novi Sad IV (constituency seat) – First and Second Rounds
Zoran Jeličić	Choice for a Better Vojvodina	4,473	22.34	10,742	61.39
Marinko Šolak	Let's Get Vojvodina Moving	3,596	17.96	6,757	38.61
Aleksandar Kravić	League of Social Democrats of Vojvodina	3,379	16.88		
Dragan Jokić	Socialist Party of Serbia–Party of United Pensioners of Serbia–United Serbia–Social Democratic Party of Serbia	2,353	11.75		
Tomislav Ugarković	Democratic Party of Serbia	2,237	11.17		
Zoran Beronja	Preokret	1,918	9.58		
Milena Biberdžić	Serbian Radical Party	1,264	6.31		
Milorad Lukić	Coalition: Maja Gojković–United Regions of Serbia	798	3.99		
Total valid votes		20,018	100	17,499	100

2008 Vojvodina assembly election Novi Sad III (constituency seat) – First and Second Rounds
Igor Pavličić	For a European Vojvodina	5,730	24.71	10,887	70.97
Zoran Mašić	Serbian Radical Party	4,637	20.00	4,453	29.03
Aleksandar Kravić	Together for Vojvodina	4,620	19.93		
Dejan Gojković	Citizen's Group: Maja Gojković	2,577	11.11		
Marko Krstić	Democratic Party of Serbia–New Serbia	1,846	7.96		
Andrija Šrek	Liberal Democratic Party	1,389	5.99		
Novak Vukoje	People's Movement for Vojvodina (We Reformers: Social Democratic Party–People's Party–Workers and Pensioners Party–Serbian Unity–Serbian Liberal Party–Veterans Movement of Vojvodina)	1,215	5.67		
Zoran Obradović	Socialist Party of Serbia–Party of United Pensioners of Serbia	1,071	4.62		
Total valid votes		23,185	100	15,340	100
Invalid ballots		689		235	
Total votes casts		23,874	60.91	15,575	39.74

2004 Vojvodina assembly election Novi Sad III (constituency seat) – First and Second Rounds
Svetlana Lukić-Petrović	Democratic Party	3,297	23.24	9,962	59.74
Zoran Mašić	Serbian Radical Party	3,434	24.21	6,714	40.26
Miodrag Isakov	Clean Hands of Vojvodina	2,419	17.05		
Aleksandar Kravić (incumbent)	Together for Vojvodina	1,881	13.26		
Petar Mudri	Citizens' Group: For a Better Petrovaradin and Novi Sad	1,223	8.62		
Miodrag Komar	Democratic Party of Serbia	1,080	7.61		
Uranija Kozmidis Luburić	G17 Plus	850	5.99		
Total valid votes		14,184	100	16,676	100
Invalid ballots		548		409	
Total votes casts		14,732	40.84	17,085	47.36
