= II liga zapad =

Album by Atheist Rap

Studio album by Atheist Rap
- Released: 1998
- Genre: Punk rock, hardcore punk, pop punk, comedy rock
- Length: 33:59
- Label: Hi-Fi Centar

Atheist Rap chronology
Ja eventualno bih ako njega eliminišete (1995)	II liga zapad (1998)	Osveta Crnog Gonzalesa (2005)

II liga zapad is the third studio album by the Serbian punk rock band Atheist Rap, released by Hi-Fi Centar in 1998.

== Track listing ==
Music and lyrics by Atheist Rap. The song "Tomi Gan" features the theme from The Clash song "Tommy Gun".

No.	Title	Length
1.	"Atheist Rap II"	0:46
2.	"Letnji hit" (Summer Hit)	3:24
3.	"Stvar Za Živi Album" (A Live Album Thing)	3:33
4.	"II liga zapad - zapadna skupina" (Second League, West - Western Crowd)	0:12
5.	"Zapadna Evropa" (Western Europe)	2:03
6.	"3 jutara zemlje" (3 acres (12,000 m^{2}) Of Land)	4:12
7.	"Izgledna šansa" (Seeming Opportunity)	0:13
8.	"Slaughteru Nietzsche..." (Nick Slaughter...)	2:35
9.	"... motka... odjavljujem" (... Switch... Switching Off)	0:34
10.	"Dr. Pop"	3:52
11.	"Hedonist blues"	2:12
12.	"Kuvar, lopov, njegova sestra i njen ljubavnik" (The Cook, The Thief, His Sister And Her Lover)	2:00
13.	"Narodna pesma" (Folk song)	1:39
14.	"Tomi Gan" (Tommy Gun)	2:30
15.	"Metak u glavu" (Bullet In The Head)	2:12
16.	"Atheist hor" (Atheist Choir)	1:30
17.	"Džaba smo sedeli" (We've Been Sitting For Nothing)	0:56

== Personnel ==
- Leki (Zoran Lekić; bass)
- Acke (Aleksandar Milovanov; drums)
- Goja (Stevan Gojkov; guitar)
- Radule (Vladimir Radusinović; guitar, vocals)
- Dr. Pop (Aleksandar Popov; vocals)
- Pećinko (Vladimir Kozbašić; vocals)
