= Priče matorih pokvarenjaka =

Priče Matorih Pokvarenjaka

Studio album by Atheist Rap
- Released: November 30, 2009
- Recorded: June–July 2008; Socijala studios, Novi Sad
- Genre: Punk rock, pop punk, comedy rock
- Length: 37:53 (download version); 51:47 (CD version)
- Label: SKC Novi Sad
- Producer: Pedericco Rashiid

Atheist Rap chronology
Osveta Crnog Gonzalesa (2005)	Priče Matorih Pokvarenjaka (2009)

Professional ratings
Review scores
Source	Rating
Mikrofonija	(mixed)
Muzika.hr	4.5/5 stars
Popboks	6/10 stars
Terapija.net	8/10 stars

Priče matorih pokvarenjaka is the fifth album by the Serbian punk rock band Atheist Rap, released by the band themselves as a free download album, available at the Serbian official site of Converse as well as at the band's official site. During the first twenty four hours, the album was downloaded in 7500 copies. The limited edition of the album was released on CD with four bonus tracks under the SKCNS record label. The bonus tracks featured two cover versions, one The Ruts' "Something That I Said" and Pankrti track "Tko to mora biti zdaj", a rerecorded version of "Waltzer-eliminator" and the instrumental track "Vanredno stanje je redovno stanje".

== Track listing ==
All tracks written by atheist rap, except track 13, written by Paul Fox, Malcolm Owen, Dave Ruffy, Segs Jennings and Gary Barnacle, and track 15, written by Pankrti.

No.	Title	Length
1.	"Nova godina kod Majstor-Bisera" (New Year at Majstor Biser's)	1:54
2.	"Reklama Za gej-karburator szerviz" (Commercial for a gay-carburettor szerviz)	0:39
3.	"Voglio una donna!" (I want a woman!)	4:27
4.	"Ne bi bilo fer" (It wouldn't be fair)	3:01
5.	"Takav je život (radikalni stav)" (Such is life (radical attitude))	3:34
6.	"Surferska katakomba (podnivo 2)" (Surfers' catacomb (sub-level 2))	3:06
7.	"Spritzerboyz!" (Spritzer boys!)	3:29
8.	"Uprava - napolje!" (Administration - get out!)	3:06
9.	"Samo droga državu spasava" (Only drugs save the country)	7:13
10.	"Njanjava"	2:56
11.	"Pesma Za Kraj" (A song for the end)	4:28
12.	"Vanredno stanje je redovno stanje *" (Emergency state is a regular state)	4:28
13.	"Something That I Said *"	3:22
14.	"Waltzer-eliminator *" (Eliminator waltz)	3:39
15.	"Tko to mora biti zdaj *" (So, now it must be)	2:25

- Bonus tracks on the limited edition CD release

== Personnel ==
- Leki (Zoran Lekić; bass, backing vocals)
- Atzke (Aleksandar Milovanov; drums)
- Dulles (Dušan Ječmenica; guitar, backing vocals)
- Radule (Vladimir Radusinović; guitar, vocals)
- Dr. Pop (Aleksandar Popov; vocals)
- Pedericco Rashiid (Vladimir Radusinović; producer)
