= Laboratorija Zvuka =

Serbian–Yugoslav rock band

- Laboratorija Zvuka in 1980, from left to right: Ivan Kašik, Aleksandar Pejak, Dina Kurbatfinsky Vranešević, Mladen Vranešević, Renata Viegy, Đorđe Urban and Predrag Vranešević

Background information
- Also known as: Laboratorija
- Origin: Novi Sad, Serbia
- Genres: Rock; avant-garde rock; art rock; new wave; pop rock; synth-pop
- Years active: 1977–1996
- Labels: PGP-RTB, Jugoton, Komuna, M Music
- Past members: Predrag Vranešević; Mladen Vranešević; Aleksandar Pejak; Stevan Lukić; Laslo Pihler; Vera Lajko; Dina Kurbatfinsky Vranešević; Aleksandar Kravić; Olah Vince; Đorđe Urban; Ivan Kašik; Renata Viegy; Deže Molnar; Miroslav Cvetković; Zoran Bulatović; Ivan Fece; Stojan Jovanović; Senad Jašarević
- Website: www.laboratorijazvuka.com

Laboratorija Zvuka (Serbian Cyrillic: Лабораторија Звука; trans. Sound Laboratory), credited as Laboratorija (Laboratory) only on some of their releases, was a Serbian and Yugoslav rock band formed in Novi Sad in 1977. Laboratorija Zvuka were a prominent act of the Yugoslav rock scene, noted for their eccentric style, erotic lyrics, unusual line ups and bizarre circus-inspired stage performances.

The band was formed by brothers Predrag and Mladen Vranešević, who had previously been composing music for theatre, film, radio and television. Laboratorija Zvuka gained the attention of the public and the media with their early 7-inch singles. The group released their debut, concept album Telo in 1980, joining in on the Yugoslav new wave scene and gaining notable mainstream popularity. Their following releases, Duboko u tebi and Nevinost, were stylistically diverse, the band maintaining their provocative lyrical style. In the late 1980s, the group, although never officially disbanding, retired from scene, as Vranešević brothers dedicated themselves to music for film, theatre and radio and TV shows. The group returned to the scene in the mid-1990s, only to release their last album, Nema niđe te ljepote.

== History ==
=== 1960s and early 1970s: Vranešević brothers' beginnings ===
Predrag "Peđa" Vranešević started his musical career in 1962 in Novi Sad, playing in a local band. In 1964, he was one of the forming members of the Belgrade band The Best of Nothing. The members of the band chose their name after a poem by Dylan Thomas. The band consisted of Zlatko Lozić (vocals), Dejan Ilić (guitar), Predrag Vranešević (bass guitar), Drago Juričević (rhythm guitar) and Nikola Ranđelović (drums). Initially, they performed beat music, but later turned towards The Byrds-inspired folk rock and gained local popularity. Their songs had unusual titles—for instance, "Intelektualno sakupljanje jabuka u dolini senki" ("Intellectual Apple Gathering in the Valley of Shadows")—and were influenced by mysticism. The band ended their activity in 1968, after Lozić was shot in both legs by the police during the 1968 student demonstrations in Belgrade. After The Best of Nothing disbanded, Predrag Vranešević moved back to Novi Sad, where he formed the band Med (Honey). With Med he made his first recording, the song "Gajba" ("Crate"). Simultaneously with his work in Med, he worked as the editor of the Novi Sad Youth Grandsand film program and wrote film reviews for the Index magazine. In 1971, he started an art group with several conceptual artists from Novi Sad. In 1972, he graduated from the University of Belgrade Faculty of Architecture and got an employment in Urbis architectural and planning company, where he worked until 1981.

Mladen "Bata" Vranešević started his career as the vocalist for the bands Falkoni (The Falcons) and Neoplanti (The Neoplanters), and later joined Med. In 1971, the brothers started composing music for theatre plays, films, radio and TV shows. They debuted with music for Karpo Godina's 1971 short film Zdravi ljudi za razonodu (Healthy People for Recreation), composed on the lyrics of poet and musician Branko Andrić. For the music they were awarded on the Belgrade Festival of Short and Documentary Film, which motivated them to continue composing. During the years, they wrote music for over 150 films, most prominently for Karpo Godina's The Medusa Raft and Artificial Paradise, Dragan Kresoja's One Last Time, The End of the War, Oktoberfest, The Original of the Forgery, Full Moon Over Belgrade, and numerous TV shows, including popular children's shows Poletarac (Nestling), Priče iz Nepričave (Stories from Nepričava), Fore i fazoni (Jokes and Gags) and Čik pogodi ko sam (Guess Who I Am). They wrote music for plays by Belgrade National Theatre, Sarajevo National Theatre, Belgrade Drama Theatre, Duško Radović Theatre and other Yugoslav theatres. For their work they received several awards in Yugoslavia and abroad. In 1975, they started their own recording studio.

In 1976, Vranešević brothers created the theatre play Gastarbajter opera (Gastarbeiter Opera) with film director Želimir Žilnik. Five years earlier, the brothers and Žilnik tried to produce their rock opera Fabrike radnicima (Factories to the Workers) in Atelje 212 theatre, but were—despite positive reactions by prominent figures involved in the theatre's work, like writers Jovan Ćirilov and Borislav Mihajlović Mihiz, director Borka Pavićević and actor Zoran Radmilović—refused by managing director Mira Trailović due to the play being overly politically provocative. Gastarbajter opera was initially offered to Kammerspiel theatre from Munich, which refused it, so eventually it premiered in the Serbian National Theatre in Novi Sad, causing a minor diplomatic incident. The play dealt with life of Yugoslav migrant workers in West Germany and Austria. After the play's premiere, the cultural attaché of the Embassy of the Federal Republic of Germany tried to put across the ban of the play, claiming that it portrayed German employers as fascists. After a TV crew from Cologne did a report about the play, containing shots of the play and interviews with the authors, the scandal quieted down.

=== Late 1970s and 1980s: Band formation, rise to prominence and mainstream popularity ===
In 1977, Vranešević brothers formed the band Laboratorija Zvuka. They chose the name Laboratorija Zvuka as they often experimented with sound in their studio. The band featured musicians with whom the brothers had previously worked in studio: Aleksandar Pejak (guitar), Stevan Lukić (guitar), Laslo Pihler (drums), Vera Lajko (vocals, keyboards), Dina Kurbatfinsky Vranešević (Mladen Vranešević's wife, vocals), Aleksandar "Caki" Kravić (bass guitar), and Olah Vince (violin). During the following years, Vince would simultaneously perform with Romani music band Zemlja, Točak i Nebo (Earth, Wheel and Sky).

With the song "Dok vam je još vreme" ("While You Still Can") Laboratorija Zvuka appeared at the 1978 Opatija Festival. After Opatija Festival, they performed on the 1978 Subotica Youth Festival. After the success of their debut 7-inch single, featuring the songs "Dok vam je još vreme" and "Sve je to bilo u proleće" ("It All Happened in the Spring"), the band released two more 7-inch singles, recorded the songs "Mirišem" ("I Smell") for Goran Marković's 1979 film National Class Category Up to 785 ccm, and started working on their debut album. The album, entitled Telo (The Body), was released through Jugoton in 1980. It featured new bass guitarist, Đorđe Urban, new drummer, Ivan Kašik, and new female vocalist, Renata Viegy. Telo was a concept album, with the A-side entitled Vrline (Virtues), featuring the songs which celebrated asceticism and healthy lifestyle, while the B-side, entitled Poroci (Vices), featured songs about bodily pleasures. The album opens with an acted transmission from the bodybuilding competition in Bački Jarak, and is followed by new wave-oriented (but also featuring elements of other genres) songs "Suvarak" ("Spall"), "Lepo telo" ("Pretty Body", featuring a quotation from Oliver Dragojević's song "Oprosti mi, pape"), "Alkohol, žene i..." ("Alcohol, Women and...", featuring a quotation from the Rolling Stones' "(I Can't Get No) Satisfaction"), "Bajna mašina" ("Fabulous Machine"). The album cover was designed by Predrag Vranešević. Telo was sold in 60,000 copies in Yugoslavia, becoming a silver record.

On the concerts which followed the album release, the band performed in a thirteen-piece lineup, which, beside the band members, featured bodybuilding champion Petar Čelik and his wife Irena. While the band was playing, Čelik was practicing his bodybuilding using various training devices. The unusual performances brought them large attention of the media. Later during the year, the band released a 7-inch single which brought their biggest hit, the ska song "Ska-kavac joj zaš'o u rukavac" ("Grasshopper Got in Her Sleeve"), which featured quotes from Crven ban, a collection of erotic folk poetry compiled by Vuk Stefanović Karadžić. The song also featured the debut appearance of the band's mascot, Vilmoš Kauboj (Vilmoš the Cowboy, real name Vilmoš Lakatoš), a marginal character from the streets of Novi Sad, who toured with the band as the announcer.

The band's following album, Duboko u tebi (Deep inside You), was released through Jugoton in 1982 and featured the cover designed by renowned comic book artist Igor Kordej. The album was stylistically more diverse than the band's debut, with some of the songs featuring elements of rockabilly. The song "Zaboravljena draga" ("The Forgotten Beloved"), released on the album, was originally recorded for Zoran Amar's film Piknik u Topoli (Picnic in Topola), and featured lyrics written by Predrag Vranešević and Slobodan Tišma, the leader of Luna and former leader of La Strada. However, as Tišma did not want to be known that he worked on the song lyrics, he was signed on the album as Bobo Misteriozo. The album also featured a cover of Larry Williams' "Bony Moronie", and "Odlazim dolazim" ("I'm Leaving I'm Coming"), the latter recorded live in 1978 on the band's performance at the Subotica Youth Festival. At the time of the album recording, the band's new members became Deže Molnar (saxophone) and Miroslav Cvetković "Pis" (guitar). In 1982, the band performed in West Germany, on the concerts organized by Cultural and Educational Trust of Vojvodina for the children of Yugoslav guest workers. During this stay in Germany, the band recorded the synth-pop-oriented 7-inch single with the songs "Devica 69" ("Virgin 69") i "Šetnja" ("A Walk").

After their return from West Germany, the band continued to perform in Yugoslavia, and in late 1982 Predrag Vranešević was charged because the band "insulted socialist moral and hurt patriotic feelings" of the citizens of Novo Mesto, SR Slovenia. Some citizens of Novo Mesto saw a poster announcing Laboratorija Zvuka concert in the city, depicting naked Vilmoš Kauboj with a hat similar to the ones often worn by late President of Yugoslavia Josip Broz Tito. Believing the image of Vilmoš Kauboj insults the memory of Tito, some citizens of Novo Mesto took the posters to the police. The consequent trial resulted in Predrag Vranešević initially being sentenced to 40 days in prison, but the whole case was soon hushed up as absurd and the charges were dropped.

In 1983, the band performed in West Germany once again, and after performing at the Zagreb Music Biennale alongside Gang of Four and Classix Nouveaux, they established contacts with British managers, and in August 1984 went to London. During five evenings they performed in London's Institute of Contemporary Arts, under the name La Boratoria. The happening, entitled Jašući konje Svetog Marka (Riding the Horses of Saint Mark), featured an art exhibition and a theatre play about a hero named PVC, "the illegitimate son of Sergei Yesenin and Isadora Duncan". On the scene appeared the members of the band, ballet dancers, and bodybuilder Slobodan Blagojević. The performance was met with positive reactions by the British press. During their staying in London, the band recorded a short documentary, entitled Kuda ide naše malo društvo (Where Is Our Small Society Heading To), with the screenplay written by Predrag, and directed by Mladen Vranešević. At this time, Mladen Vranešević started working with younger band, and helped Plavi Orkestar and Ruž in their first steps.

Laboratorija Zvuka with their two "mascots": Dušica Ilić (first one from the left) and Vilmoš Kauboj (sitting)

In 1986, the band released the album Nevinost (Virginity), in the new lineup, which featured Predrag Vranešević on keyboards, guitar and vocals, Deže Molnar on saxophone, Mladen Vranešević, Renata Viegy and Dina Kurbatfinsky Vranešević on vocals, a former Luna and Pekinška Patka member Zoran "Bale" Bulatović on guitar, a former Luna and Ekatarina Velika member Ivan Fece "Firchie" on drums, Stojan Jovanović on bass guitar, and Senad Jašarević on keyboards. The band's mascot, beside Vilmoš Kauboj, became a trans woman named Dušica Ilić, who would in the 1990s become known as the clairvoyant under the name Kleopatra. In accordance with the album title, the center label on the vinyl record did not have a hole in the middle, and buyers of the album had to tear it by putting the record on a record player spindle. Beside new material, the album featured new versions of songs "Ska-kavac joj zašo u rukavac", "Devica" and "Šetnja", originally released on the band's 7-inch singles. The tracks "Daj mi bugi, dam ti vugi" ("Give Me Boogie, I'll Give You Woogie"), "Mala moja, al' je paranoja" ("My Baby Is Paranoid") and "Vili, Vili" ("Willie, Willie") saw large airplay. After the album release, Vranešević brothers dedicated themselves to composing for film, theatre and television, and the band, although officially still active, appeared in media sporadically only.

=== 1990s: Final works and disbandment ===
After a longer break in their work, the band, in 1996, released the album entitled in Serbian ijekavian, Nema niđe te ljepote (There's No Such a Beauty), through Komuna. The album featured ten songs, recorded in a minimalist manner and resembling demo recordings. The title track was originally recorded for the Tourism Association of Montenegro, and the others were written during different phases of the band's career, but were previously unrecorded. The album featured the song "Čudnan susret u tmurno popodne" ("A Strange Encounter during the Gloomy Afternoon"), originally performed by Vranešević brother's old band Med. The songs "Do I Dare" and "Vinyl Mirrors" were written on the poems of Johnatan Loyd, and the lyrics for the song "Mimi" were written after the motifs from Ivo Tijardović's works. The album was recorded in the lineup featuring Vranešević brothers, Molnar, Bulatović, and the backing vocals were sung by Milana Vranešević, daughter of Mladen and Dina Vranešević. Nema niđe te ljepote was met with mostly negative reactions by the music critics. After the album release, the band officially ended their activity.

=== Post-breakup ===
In 1991, Predrag Vranešević became the TV Novi Sad musical editor. He retired in 2005, dedicating himself to composing. In 2011, in cooperation with Želimir Žilnik, he created the opera Nema zemlja (Silent Land), partially based on their 1971 rock opera Fabrike radnicima. The music from the play was released on the album Nema zemlja. In 2014, Ira Prodanov Krajišnik and Živko Popović published the monograph Ulaz slobodan (Free Entrance) about Predrag Vranešević's work on theatre music. The monograph was accompanied by a DVD featuring 50 recordings from 18 different plays featuring Predrag Vranešević's music. For his 70th birthday, he released the solo album Argyle Street. His last work was his music composed for a documentary about Želimir Žilnik directed by Janko Baljak. He died on 6 February 2022.

Mladen Vranešević dedicated himself to marketing. He died on 15 July 2006.

Dina Kurbatfinsky Vranešević also turned to marketing, becoming the assistant of Radio Television of Serbia marketing manager, and later became the general manager of Radio Television of Vojvodina. Renata Viegy turned to acting, becoming an actress in the Serbian National Theatre in Novi Sad. Deže Molnar, after Laboratorija Zvuka ended its activity, performed with numerous artists, including Tony Scott, Milan Mladenović, Mitar Subotić, Aleksandar Dujin, and others. He died in Novi Sad on 18 November 2013.

== Legacy ==
Serbian rock band Minstrel recorded a cover of the song "Zaboravljena draga" for their 2008 album Iskra (The Spark). Serbian pub rock band Optimal Problem recorded a cover of the theme song for the TV show Poletarac for their 2017 album Ispred svih (Better than All).

In 2006, the song "Ska-kavac joj zaš'o u rukavac" was ranked No. 84 on the B92 Top 100 Domestic Songs list.

In 2007, the band was awarded the Lifetime Achievement Award at the 54th Belgrade Festival of Short and Documentary Film.

== Discography ==
=== Studio albums ===
- Telo (1980)
- Duboko u tebi (1982)
- Nevinost (1986)
- Nema niđe te ljepote (1996)

=== Compilation albums ===
- Laboratorija Zvuka (2005)

=== Singles ===
- "Dok vam je još vreme" / "Sve je to bilo u proleće" (1978)
- "Ko ne zna da se smeši" / "Brek boks" (1978)
- "Kad postanem slab i star" / "Kas" (1979)
- "Mod-deran" / "Ska-kavac joj zaš'o u rukavac" (1980)
- "Poletarac"/ "Stočiću postavi se" / "Oproštaj od magneta" (1981)
- "Devica 69" / "Šetnja" (1982)
- "Još ovaj put" / "Još ovaj put – instrumental" (1983)

== See also ==
- New wave music in Yugoslavia
