= Atheist Rap =

Serbian punk rock band

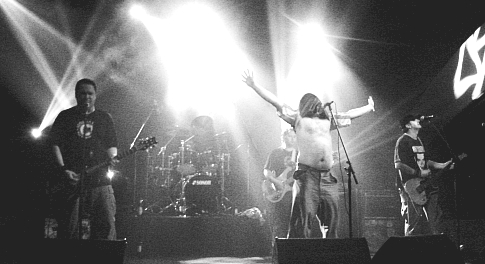
- Atheist Rap performing live in 2007

Background information
- Also known as: Božidara Starog Punk, Električni Jurica, Ateist Rep
- Origin: Novi Sad, Serbia
- Genres: Punk rock, hardcore punk, pop punk
- Years active: 1989–present
- Labels: GBB Tapes, Scorned Records, Take It Or Leave It, PGP-RTS, Hi-Fi Centar, Multimedia Records, SKCNS, B Pop Založba
- Members: Aleksandar Popov; Vladimir Radusinović; Zoran Lekić; Aleksandar Milovanov; Branko Radusinović
- Past members: Dušan Ječmenica; Slobodan Fekete; Stevan Gojkov; Vladimir Kozbašić; Zoran Zarić; Zoran Džuklevski
- Website: atheistrap.net

Atheist Rap is a Yugoslav and Serbian punk rock band from Novi Sad, formed in 1989, which has released six studio albums, one compilation album and one live DVD. Their music is often characterized as "fun punk" due to its cheerful music and vocals. Their lyrics are usually critical of society and politics and are often humorous accounts of everyday events.

== History ==
=== 1980s ===
The idea of forming Atheist Rap came to vocalists Aleksandar Popov (also known as Dr. Pop) and Vladimir Kozbašić (also known as Pećinko) at the Rambo Amadeus concert, which took place on 29 November 1988, at the local club Mašinac. They merged with members of Fluorel Tatchkash, Vladimir Radusinović (also known as Radule) on guitar and Zoran Zarić (also known as Zare) on bass, and Stevan Gojkov (also knowns as Goja) (from Kapetan Leshi, Fear Of Dog, A Better Life Zine) took hold of the drums. The first live appearance was just a few days after the band was officially formed, at the Petrovaradin Fortress gate called Beogradska kapija on 22 May 1989, with several local acts. Before the appearance, with the repertoire consisting of two songs, the whole band wrote the song "O.R.A.", which was performed by Popov on vocals, Kozbašić on backing vocals, with the band improvising to the lyrics. The performance provided the band a cult status, despite not having any recordings released. The band also got invitations to perform at several Novi Sad clubs, while writing new material. At the time, the band had rehearsals and partially lived at the Žuta Kuća in Novi Sad, until it was bulldozed by the local authorities.

=== 1990s ===
In January 1990, the band performed at the alternative music festival called Bolje uživo nego u mrtvo (Better Live Than Dead), and made first recordings in June 1990, but the beginning of the Yugoslav wars at the beginning of the 1990s stopped the band from releasing the first CD release in the region. It was a four-song EP, recorded at the Barba studio in Bukovac, entitled Compact Disc, consisting of the songs "Gusti sok", "Stomak eliminator", "Novosadski vašar" and "Gril 13", that Croatian label Jugoton never put out of press, and, as a result, the material was never released in this format. One of the songs from the EP, "Gusti sok", appeared on the various artists compilation Novi Sad Vol. 2. The EP was also to be released by the Novi Sad record label Start Today Records. Despite the EP not being released, the band promoted the recordings through radio and television broadcasts, which increased their popularity. At the end of 1990, Flourel Tatchkash and Elba drummer Aleksandar Milanov "Atzke" joined the group with Gojkov switching to guitar, and the new lineup had the first live appearance at the KUD Sonja Marinković.

It was at the insisting of Tetcha Morales (manager, guitar) and Voja Žugić (Scorned Records, Three Pals Zine) that the band recorded their debut album Maori i Crni Gonzales (Māori and Black Gonzales), recorded at the Do-Re-Mi Studio in Novi Sad by the end of 1992, and released it in 1993. Despite the humorous lyrics of the songs "Ljubav", featuring the sampled speech of Josip Broz Tito, "Wartburg limuzina", "Blu Trabant" and "Plitka poezija", named after the first Pekinška patka album, and a mixture of cover versions by Pekinška Patka), the album had low official but pretty high pirate release sale. However, the band received the Album of the Year Award at the Brzi Bendovi Srbije festival. The band also occasionally performed under pseudonymous names Božidara Starog Park and Električni Jurica. "Wartburg limuzina" and "Blu Trabant" became hits in Serbia and Republic of Macedonia. The latter appeared on the American compilation Delite the Elite, featuring bands from the USA and Europe (MDC, Negu Gorriak, Credit to the Nation and Chumbawamba, Clawfinger...). Maori i Crni Gonzales was re-released by Take It Or Leave It Records in 1994, and again in 1996 by the same record label, featuring four bonus tracks from the never released EP Compact Disc. The album also featured live versions of "Ljubav", "ORA je pravi način da..." (YWA Is the Real Way To...") and "Ritam". Despite the political and economic situation in the country, the band presented the release at live performances in major cities and all around Serbia.

By the time the band released their second studio album Ja eventualno bih ako njega eliminišete (I Possibly Would if You Eliminate Him), released in 1995 through PGP-RTS, guitarist Gojkov had already left the band. The album was named by an acronym "Jebanje" ("Fucking"). The band's lyrical style was based on the rap dialectics backed with heavy punk rock riffs crossed with rockabilly and ska elements. The lyrics for the songs featured quotations from acts such as Kićo Slabinac, KUD Idijoti, Ekatarina Velika, The Clash and Soundgarden. Between the songs, the band inserted recordings from the Nacionalna klasa movie and sampled speech sections. The album was produced by the band themselves with Vojislav Aralica.

A series of successful concerts in Serbia, Republic of Macedonia and Republika Srpska, which followed the release of the album, had been stopped by the illness of Zarić, who soon after died of lymfoma cancer on 14 February 1997. He was replaced by Zoran Lekić "Leki", who previously worked with Ove Sezone Vedri Tonovi, Telegram Sam, Naučnici, Luna, La Strada, Obojeni Program, Love Hunters, Plavi Ptičić Prepeličić, and worked with the group after the release of Ja eventualno bih ako njega eliminišete in 1995. The band set off on a previously arranged tour of Slovenia and, having returned, started working a new album, entitled Druga liga zapad, released by Hi-Fi Centar. The album, produced by Marinko Vukmanović, featured cover versions of Paraf song "Narodna pjesma" and miniatures "Atheist Rap II" and "Atheist hor" ("Atheist Choir"), dedicated to the deceased bassist Zarić.

In the meantime, Hi-Fi Centar re-released the band's second album on CD. The band also appeared on the various artists compilation Punk You All with a cover version of Paraf "Narodna pjesma" and Dead Kennedys "Too Drunk to Fuck", released by Hi-Fi Centar in 1998, and recorded live at KST in Belgrade on 26 October 1996. During 1998, the band performed at the Gitarijada festival in Zaječar with a new member, guitarist Slobodan Fekete "Barbun", and in autumn, with KUD Idijoti, Goblini and Sikter, the band performed in Sarajevo at the ruined hall of the city train station.

=== 2000s ===
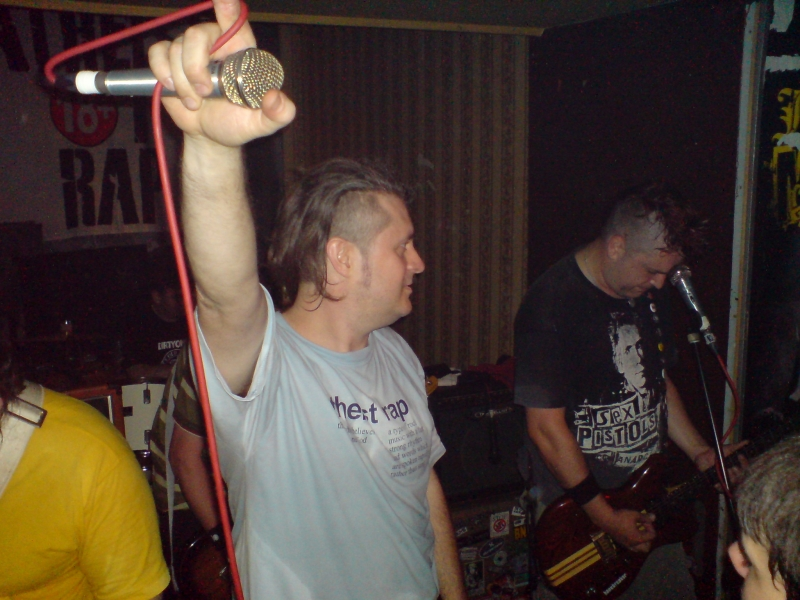
The mainstay band members: Aleksandar Popov "Dr. Pop" and Vladimir Radusinović "Radule" performing with Atheist Rap

In 2000 the band took part in the campaign Vreme je... Izađi na crtu (It's Time... Get Out There) whose aim was to motivate the people to vote against Slobodan Milošević on the upcoming elections. On October of the same year band went on a Croatian tour, playing at Močvara (Zagreb), Uljanik (Pula) and Palah (Rijeka). The following year the band released the compilation Predsednici Predsedništva Predsednika (Presidents of the Presidency of the Presidents), which featured a newly recorded version of the song "Sarajevo", and a new song "Lopovi i žace" ("Cops and Robbers").

The compilation album release was followed by absence of concert activities as Kozbašić and Fekete left the band and Radusinović started playing bass in Bonebreaker. Fekete was replaced by Dušan Ječmenica "Dulles", who played in bands KNO, Mitesers, Out Of Control, Bonebreaker, Generacija Bez Budućnosti and Boye. The new lineup of the band recorded their fifth album, Osveta Crnog Gonzalesa (Revenge of Black Gonzales), released through Multimedia Records in 2005. The album was recorded and produced by the band themselves. The album featured new songs "Pritilend", "Bluz južne pruge", "Elit luk i voda" and the previously released song "Lopovi i žace". In the meantime, the band performed at several festivals, including Nisomnia in Niš, EXIT 03 in Novi Sad and Zagreb Open-Air.

By the end of March 2005, the band started touring, performing at about thirty concerts, including the performances at the Split Gripe arena and the concerts at NS Time club. In 2006, the band appeared in the Jovan Đerić documentary about Novi Sad punk rock scene, Bilo jednom.... During the same year, Atheist Rap appeared on the Pankrti tribute album Pankrti 06 with the cover of the song "Modro nebo", Ljubiša Georgijević tribute album, with the song "Delfin", and the Novi Sad Student's Cultural Center compilation Novosadska punk verzija 1978–2005 (Novi Sad Punk Version 1978–2005) with the song "Atheist Rap" recorded at their first live act. The following year, the band performed at the Exit festival and released a DVD featuring a live performance the band held at KST in Belgrade and promotional videos for the tracks "Pritilend", "Igraš grubo", "Dve žetve godišnje" and "Audio Pula Video Split". In 2007, the band performed at the Niš Beer Fest and the following year at the Belgrade Beer Fest and Alternative Rock festival in Belgrade.

In 2009, the band started a 20th anniversary tour, performing at various venues, including the 6 June performance in Novi Sad, where as guest appeared Canadian actor Rob Stewart. Stewart, having heard the about the popularity of his former TV show Tropical Heat had in Serbia and being a symbol of the students' protests in 1996 and 1997, came to Serbia. Stewart appeared as guest on the band's song "Slaughteru Nietzsche" (from the album II liga zapad) dedicated to him.

The band released their fifth studio album, Priče matorih pokvarenjaka, on 30 November, in two formats, the MP3 version, available for free download at the band and the Serbian Converse official site, and a limited edition CD released by SKC Novi Sad, featuring four bonus tracks. During the first twenty four hours, the album was downloaded in 7500 copies.

=== 2010s ===
On 7 July 2011, the band opened the twelfth Exit Festival with their performance on the Main Stage. In August, the band performed in England, in Barfly club in London on 5 August, and on Rebellion Festival in Blackpool on 7 August.

In April 2012, the band released the single "Mene za budžu" ("Vote Me for Hot-Shot"). In March 2013, the band members, together with the members of Dubioza Kolektiv and Hladno Pivo, recorded a cover of KUD Idijoti song "Ja sjećam se" ("I Remember") as a tribute to deceased KUD Idijoti frontman, Brako Črnac "Tusta". The song was released on Dubioza Kolektiv album Apsurdistan. In May, the band appeared on the tribute album to the band Brkovi entitled Brkati gosti with a cover of Brkovi song "Usamljen-oženjen". At the end of 2013, the documentary Slaughter Nick for President, dealing with popularity of Tropical Heat in Serbia and featuring the band was released.

In February 2014, the band released the single "Drugo pakovanje" ("Different Package") and started a tour across Serbia and Croatia in order to celebrate their 25th anniversary. In autumn of 2014, the band participated in a tribute album to Novembar, entitled Tako mlad i tako čist (So Young and So Clean), with a cover of Novembar song "Ko je sunce ubio?" ("Who Killed the Sun?"). In April 2015, the band went on a German tour, which featured eleven concerts, few of them with Defenders of the Universe. On 3 September 2015, the band performed on the Novi Sad Festival of Street Musicians, having a joint concert with Croatian band Let 3. The concert, entitled Street Musical Clash and held on Novi Sad Liberty Square, featured the band's performing on tho separate stages, but performing songs of each other's. In November 2015 the band released their 6th studio album called "Uberlauf" and in 2016 started "Uberlauf tour", which will include all ex-Yugoslav republics, Germany and France.

== Legacy ==
In 2011, the song "Fatamorgana" ("Mirage") was voted, by the listeners of Radio 202, one of 60 greatest songs released by PGP-RTB/PGP-RTS during the sixty years of the label's existence.

== Discography ==
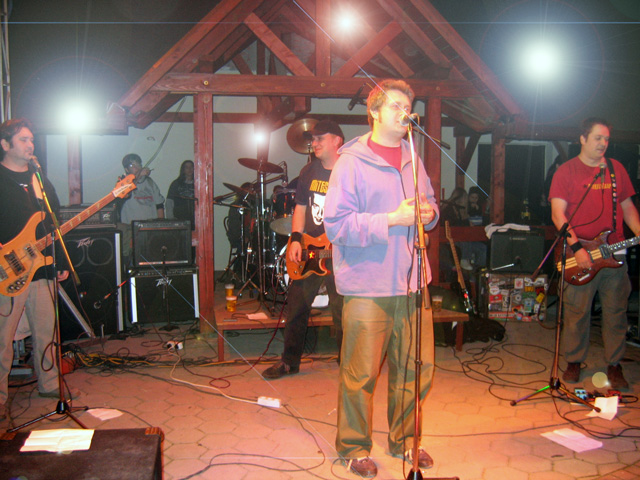
Atheist Rap performing in 2007

=== Studio albums ===
- Maori i Crni Gonzales (1992)
- Ja eventualno bih ako njega eliminišete (1996)
- II liga zapad (1998)
- Osveta Crnog Gonzalesa (2005)
- Priče matorih pokvarenjaka (2009)
- Uberlauf (2015)

=== Compilation albums ===
- Predsednici Predsedništva Predsednika (2001)

=== Video albums ===
- Live in KST (2008)

=== Other appearances ===
- "Usamljen oženjen" (Brkati gosti, 2013)
- "Ko je sunce ubio?" (Tako mlad i tako čist, 2014)

== See also ==
- Punk rock in Yugoslavia
