= Festival of Street Musicians =

Music and arts festival

- Genre: Street theatre, street musician
- Dates: annually around first weekend in September
- Locations: Novi Sad, Serbia
- Years active: since 2000
- Website: http://www.ulicnisviraci.com

The Festival of Street Musicians (Serbian: Фестивал уличних свирача / Festival uličnih svirača) is a non-competitive festival, which gathers the street art performers and musicians. It is held annually in early September in the city center of Novi Sad, in Serbia. The festival is founded by Centre for Culture Animation, and sponsored by the City of Novi Sad.

The festival features performers of different music genres often playing unusual instruments in a series of street shows, dances and acrobatics. The first festival was held in 2001, initiated by Robert Kolar, the former MP for culture. From the very beginning, the Festival has had not only international character, but includes artists from Novi Sad that are just starting off.

Tourist organization of Serbia awarded the Festival with the award Tourist Flower, in the category Cultural-tourist manifestation contributing to tourism.

In 2012 the festival received funding from the European Union and as such has gained a status of a European Festival. Over 150 worldwide artists had performed.
