= Biti ružan, pametan i mlad =

Single by Pekinška Patka

from the album Plitka poezija
- Released: 19 September 1979
- Recorded: 1979
- Genre: Punk rock
- Length: 1:59
- Label: Jugoton; SY 23575
- Songwriter(s): Nebojša Čonkić, Sreten Kovačević
- Producer(s): Slobodan Konjović

Pekinška Patka singles chronology
""Biti ružan, pametan i mlad" / "Bela šljiva"" (1979)	"Bolje da nosim kratku kosu" (1980)

"Biti ružan, pametan i mlad" (trans. "To Be Ugly, Smart and Young") is a song by Serbian and Yugoslav punk rock band Pekinška Patka, released in 1979, appearing on the double A-side single with the song "Bela šljiva" ("White Plum"). The song, considered the first punk rock single by a band coming from SR Serbia, appeared on the band's 1980 debut album Plitka poezija (Shallow Poetry). The song was, alongside the band's song "Bolje da nosim kratku kosu" ("I Better Wear My Hair Short"), often described as an anthem of Yugoslav punk rockers.

== Traclisting ==
Both tracks by Nebojša Čonkić and Sreten Kovačević

1. "Biti ružan, pametan i mlad" (1:59)
2. "Bela šljiva" (1:56)

== Personnel ==
- Nebojša Čonkić - vocals
- Sreten Kovačević - guitar
- Boško Prosenica - guitar
- Boris Oslovčan - bass guitar
- Laslo Pihler - drums

== Cover versions ==
- Serbian punk rock band Atheist Rap recorded a cover version of the song as a part of the Pekinška Patka covers medley entitled "Plitka poezija", released on their 1994 debut album Maori i Crni Gonzales (Māori and Black Gonzales).
- Serbian hardcore punk band Sick Mother Fakers often performed the song live.
