= Pekinška Patka =

Serbian punk rock band

- Pekinška Patka's best-known initial lineup, from left to right: Laslo Pihler, Nebojša Čonkić, Sreten Kovačević, and Boris Oslovčan.

Background information
- Origin: Novi Sad, Serbia
- Genres: Punk rock; new wave; post-punk; dark wave
- Years active: 1978–1981; 2008; 2010–2012; 2021–present
- Labels: Jugoton; Multimedia Records; Long Play
- Members: Sreten Kovačević; Laslo Pihler; Stefan Stanojević; Sava Obradović; Igor Mihaljević
- Past members: Nebojša Čonkić; Miloš Žurić; Srbislav Dobanovački; Boris Oslovčan; Boško Prosenica; Zoran Bulatović; Aleksandar Kravić; Marinko Vukmanović; Robert Radić
- Website: pekinskapatka.com

Pekinška Patka (Serbian Cyrillic: Пекиншка Патка; trans. Peking Duck) is a Serbian and Yugoslav punk rock band formed in Novi Sad in 1978. The band was among the pioneers of punk rock in Socialist Federal Republic of Yugoslavia and is widely considered one of the most prominent and influential acts of the Yugoslav punk rock scene and the closely associated Yugoslav new wave scene.

Pekinška Patka was formed by vocalist Nebojša "Čonta" Čonkić, guitarist Sreten "Sreta" Kovačević, drummer Laslo "Cila" Pihler and bass guitarist Miloš Žurić, the latter soon replaced by Srbislav "Srba" Dobanovački, himself later replaced by Boris Oslovčan. In 1979, the band was joined by the second guitarist Boško "Brča" Prosenica. With their energetic and provocative live performances, the young band attracted immediate public and media attention in Yugoslavia, but also saw criticism from conservative cultural circles as well as unenthusiastic music press reviews dismissing their act as puerile and sophomoric. The band's early singles brought them significant popularity while their 1980 debut album Plitka poezija is considered the very first punk rock album by a Serbia-based group. Following subsequent personnel changes—both guitarists, Kovačević and Prosenica, replaced by a single one, Zoran "Bale" Bulatović, and bassist Oslovčan replaced by Marinko Vukmanović—the band released their second album Strah od monotonije in 1981. Shifting towards post-punk and darkwave sound, the album was met with a lukewarm public reception and poor reviews, leading to the group disbanding the same year.

In 2008, the band reunited with Čonkić on vocals, Kovačević on guitar, Pihler on drums and Oslovčan on bass guitar for a one-off performance, playing on the main stage of Novi Sad EXIT Festival alongside Sex Pistols. Two years later, the lineup that had worked on the band's second album—Čonkić, Pihler, Bulatović and Vukmanović—reunited for new performances; Pihler, however, eventually withdrew, ostensibly due to health issues, and was replaced by drummer Robert Radić. The reunion was disapproved of by Kovačević who delivered threats of legal action against Čonkić over copyright. Legal action would eventually be filed, resulting in a process before Serbian courts during mid-to-late 2010s that was won by Kovačević who, in 2021, joined up with Pihler for Pekinška Patka's third reunion, the incarnation performing only songs from the band's initial punk rock phase. In 2024, Čonkić formed his own band named Profesor Čonta i Patka (Professor Čonta and the Duck).

== History ==
=== Origins and background (1976–1978) ===
Pekinška Patka's roots can be traced back to the short-lived Novi Sad-based cover band Trafo, formed in 1976 by electric guitarist Sreten Kovačević with Nebojša "Čonta" Čonkić providing the vocals. Further featuring Štrc on bass and Zare on drums, they performed covers of rock standards by globally popular bands such as the Rolling Stones, Santana, and Deep Purple at local dance parties.

A year later, Kovačević formed pop rock band Café Express. It featured Kovačević on guitar, Boba Mama on guitar, Aleksandar Čerevicki on keyboards, Aleksandar "Caki" Kravić on bass guitar, Laslo "Cila" Pihler (formerly of Tanker) on drums, and Aleksandar Krstić on vocals, with Nebojša Čonkić appearing as guest vocalist on the band's performances, singing international rock hits. The group disbanded in the spring of 1978.

=== Band formation and initial activity (1978) ===
Pekinška Patka was formed in mid-1978 by Nebojša Čonkić (vocals)–at the time an electrical engineering graduate and a teacher at Novi Sad's Electrical Engineering School Centre–Sreten Kovačević (guitar), Laslo Pihler (drums) and Miloš Žurić (bass guitar). Prior to Pekinška Patka formation, Čonkić, Kovačević and Pihler had already collaborated in Café Express. Pihler, who was at the time known under the nickname Dupli Skalp (Two-Scalp, after a character from the French comic book Oumpah-pah) because he sometimes used to wear a wig, had previously also played with Laboratorija Zvuka.

According to Čonkić, Pekinška Patka was formed on his initiative in May 1978. Čonkić had already become enamoured with punk rock, a new musical genre he had been enjoying via Radio Luxembourg, and approached his friend Sreten Kovačević at Novi Sad's Bulevar cafe about trying out two of Čonkić's punk-inspired musical ideas "just for fun". The two ideas were a riff that he came up with while unsuccessfully trying to reproduce a song off of Radio Luxembourg (the riff would eventually become basis for "Bela šljiva") and proposal to cover Procol Harum's 1967 ballad "Homburg" in a faster-paced punk arrangement. Both university graduates in their mid-20s, Čonkić and Kovačević had had a long prior history: in addition to being part of the same social circle in Novi Sad and past involvement in multiple joint musical collaborations, the two had attended the same high school, Jovan Jovanović Zmaj gymnasium, and later studied at University of Novi Sad's Faculty of Technical Sciences. Missing a drummer for their latest punk-inspired collaboration, Kovačević brought in Laslo "Cila" Pihler. The trio of Čonkić, Kovačević, and Pihler began practicing at one of the backrooms within Mašinac club, itself run by the Faculty of Technical Sciences. Kovačević then brought in bass guitarist Miloš "Žure" Žurić, and the now four-piece practiced throughout June 1978, scheduling the rehearsals around live broadcasts of the 1978 FIFA World Cup football matches from Argentina. Sporting long hairs, despite trying to play punk, each one of the four young men's respective appearances and musical sensibilities were still a mixture of several Western 1960s and 70s cultural trends, mostly hippie counterculture and prog rock.

According to Kovačević, on the other hand, Pekinška Patka was his idea all along, spawned during February-March 1978 while he played weekly Thursday-night dance parties at Mašinac with his band Café Express. Frustrated at the crowds' indifferent reaction to his shoddy guitar solos, construction engineering graduate Kovačević reportedly sought a simpler and more direct way of playing music, finding the emerging punk genre perfectly suitable in this regard. He claims to have first reached out to his Café Express drummer Pihler about putting the new punk project together followed by bassist Žurić and only then, once they realized a need for a vocalist, contacting Čonkić whom the three had "known from around town". Kovačević did acknowledge Čonkić for coming up with the band name; Čonkić suggested Pekinška Patka because he believed it reminds of the word punk.

The band's first live performance, a 9-minute set, took place at Mašinac club in late June 1978 with four people in attendance, all of them friends of the band members. The material they performed consisted of four tracks: aforementioned "Bela šljiva" ("White Plum") and cover of "Homburg", in addition to two new songs, Čonkić-written "Kratkovidi magarac" ("Shortsighted Donkey") and Čonkić/Kovačević co-written "Šta je zbližilo nas" ("What Made Us Closer"). After the performance, Žurić left the band, and was replaced by Srbislav "Srba" Dobanovački.

Čonkić spent the July of 1978 in London, attending a study-English-abroad course at a UK-based college. Taking in the city's music scene by going out to live shows on a nightly basis, he ended up seeing a variety of performers—including punk and punk-adjacent acts such as The Clash, The Specials, Midge Ure, Glen Matlock's Rich Kids, Skids, and Magazine. He was particularly impressed with one of The Clash shows from their four-night July 24-27 residency at the Music Machine venue, with The Specials as the opening act, where The Clash played material off their upcoming album Give 'Em Enough Rope—a live performance Čonkić would later state influenced him the most of any he'd ever seen. The look, posture, and pageantry of English punk as well as The Clash's performative manner 24-year-old Čonkić witnessed that night in Camden would subsequently be copied by his own fledgling band upon his return home to Yugoslavia.

Čonkić and Kovačević continued to develop new material, both in English and Serbo-Croatian. Initially, the Čonkić-written lyrics contained a generally sophomoric common thread, steering clear of even mild allusions to local political and/or societal issues let alone direct references. Rock writers such as Dušan Vesić would later speculate about such avoidance being a consequence of the firm control local communist authorities exerted over the Novi Sad cultural scene due to the city's multiethnic character. The band practised in makeshift accommodation—a shed near Pihler's house—sharing the space with Pečat, a band Pihler also played with simultaneously to drumming for Pekinška Patka. On the band's invitation, during fall 1978, Radio Novi Sad personalities Bogomir "Bogica" Mijatović and Dragan "Goja" Gojković showed up at one of these practice sessions and, liking what they saw and heard, proceeded to champion the young band.

=== Local prominence (1978–1979) ===
The band's first prominent live appearance took place in early December 1978 at Novi Sad's Sonja Marković Club venue. The club's staff were sufficiently shocked by the performance that they decided to put a stop to it after only five or six songs, under an excuse that there was a power outage, sending the crowd of about 200 young people home. The immediate reason was the band's performance of an impromptu vulgar punk cover of a youth work action song featuring the modified lyrics "Brižit Bardo bere čičke; vidi joj se pola pičke" ("Brigitte Bardot is picking thistles; half of her pussy is hanging out").

A week later, the band played the BOOM Festival, being held in their hometown that year. What would turn out to the festival's last year was being organized and booked by the Belgrade-based promoter Peca Popović with help and input from his local Novi Sad counterparts Mijatović and Gojković who turned his attention to Pekinška Patka, resulting in the band that had only held two live performances to date being booked at the prominent festival.

At the beginning of 1979, Dobanovački was replaced by former Gomila G bass guitarist Boris "Bora" Oslovčan. Furthermore, former Direktori (The Executives) member Boško "Brča" Prosenica joined the band as its second guitarist.

The group based their act on melodic punk rock and vivid public image with high-energy live shows. Being one of the first groups in the country with this kind of sound and performing style, they attracted media interest before releasing any material. Čonkić often used those media appearances for self-promotion, delivering sweeping statements like: "We're the first important thing to happen to Yugoslav rock since Ivo Robić and Marko Novosel". He also purposely courted controversy with soundbites such as referring to his group as the "first Orthodox punk band", which went against the doctrine of the ruling League of Communists of Yugoslavia, that promoted atheism in Yugoslav society.

=== Wider popularity, first release and controversy (1979) ===
In May 1979, alongside the Zagreb-based punk rockers Prljavo Kazalište, Pekinška Patka appeared at the Subotica Youth Festival—the very first time punk rock acts performed at the prominent competitive musical festival promoting youth culture in Yugoslavia. Unlike most other young acts competing at the festival, neither of the two bands had submitted a formal application; instead, as a consequence of both already creating sufficient buzz on the scene, their respective appearances came courtesy of a special invitation from the festival director Vitomir Simurdić. Pekinška Patka performed "Bela šljiva" at the festival's opening night, easily qualifying for the final. The JRT-televised final saw Vox Populi, a duo featuring at the time little-known singer Vesna Vrandečić, win the festival's audience award while Pekinška Patka finished runners-up. In his write-up about the 1979 Subotica festival, Džuboks music magazine staff writer Branko Vukojević described the band's performance in glowing terms as "the biggest breath of fresh air".

With the band's Youth Festival appearance being broadcast on national television, the first time any punk band appeared on Yugoslav TV, Pekinška Patka began receiving attention from Yugoslav record companies. Within weeks, in late May, Radio Novi Sad enabled them to do a demo, recording seven tracks in the station's studios with Gabor Lenđel of the recently-disbanded Teška Industrija as the producer. The demo material would end up being unofficially released decades later in 2000 as a bootleg CD titled Demo 79. With demo tracks in tow, the group started negotiating with PGP-RTB label about a debut album but could not reach a deal ultimately. Instead, the band went back to playing clubs in bigger Yugoslav cities Belgrade, Zagreb, and Sarajevo, developing a wider following.

During the summer of 1979, Pekinška Patka appeared on the TV Belgrade variety program Leto na Adi (Summer at Ada), shot on a luxurious raft moored at Ada Ciganlija's Sava Lake. On the show they performed the song "Poderimo rock" ("Let's Tear Rock Apart"), originally titled "Zajebimo rok" ("Let's Screw Rock Over") but altered by Čonkić for the media appearance. Since the crowd rushed to the stage and jumped around, the raft almost sank.

The band signed with Jugoton after the label's representatives Siniša Škarica and Veljko Despot saw them perform at Zagreb's Lapidarij club in July 1979. The debut Pekinška Patka release thus became a vinyl 7-inch single with the songs "Bela šljiva" and "Biti ružan, pametan i mlad" ("To Be Ugly, Smart and Young"), produced by Slobodan Konjović, a well-known disc jockey from Studio B radio station. Prior to the single recording, Konjović had no experience in music production, but Čonkić decided to offer him the spot of the producer due to his fascination with Konjović's radio shows Ponoćni rok (Midnight Rock) and Vibracije (Vibrations). Relatively good reception of the single, with 35,000 copies sold, paved the way for them to begin recording a full-length debut album.

On 27 July 1979, Television Novi Sad (TVNS) shot a Pekinška Patka special with the band performing seven numbers, playing in a display window of the NORK department store in Novi Sad surrounded by young punk rock fans in the excruciating July heat. Directed by Siniša Reljin and shot with a film camera, the special went through multiple rounds of editing before eventually getting spiked altogether by the TVNS executives (including Pero Zubac) out of concern that some of the images in it could be interpreted as "mockery of the [Yugoslav] society". The special would finally air on television almost 15 years later, during the 1990s, by which time the group had long disbanded.

The band then accepted the offer of appearing in Kost od mamuta (Mammoth Bone), an hour-long TV movie written by Gordan Mihić, directed by Slobodan Šijan and starring actor Slavko Štimac and Novi Sad singer-songwriter Đorđe Balašević. The band members shot their part during fall of 1979. Essentially playing themselves, though not credited as Pekinška Patka, the band appeared in the film performing "Ja sam panker u sakou starom" ("I'm a Punk Rocker in an Old Coat"). The movie premiered on TV Belgrade and the rest of the Yugoslav Radio Television on 16 February 1980.

In October 1979, the band was invited to perform in the village of Stepanovićevo at the anniversary celebration of the end of World War II. The band performed their standard setlist and the show also featured blowing of condoms and throwing them to the audience as well as swearing on stage. Another punk rock band, Gomila G (a censored version of their original name Gomila Govana, Pile of Shit), which played as the opening act, performed the song "God save Martin Bormann", which at the time went virtually unnoticed due to poor sound.

At the early stages of their career, the band had little problems with the communist authorities and conservative public; rock music was widely accepted and popular in Yugoslavia (with late 1970s Yugoslav scene dominated by progressive and hard rock bands), and Pekinška Patka was initially perceived in their home city as just another rock band, with several of the band's performances even organized in the school in which Čonkić worked. However, the provocative performances alongside newly-gained popularity also got the band attention from the authorities and conservative cultural circles, especially after the Stepanovićevo concert. Part of the public believed that on-stage swearing and throwing condoms at the crowd is unacceptable behavior for a school teacher. Influential public intellectuals criticized the group's performances, some of them even describing the band as "anti-socialist elements", effectively sabotaging Čonkić's career prospects, and his chances of becoming an assistant professor at Novi Sad University were lost. Despite generating a lot of interest across Yugoslavia, the band started to experience problems with live performances in their home city, many of which would get canceled on the day of the show. Some radio and television stations refused to play the band's songs.

On the other hand, the decision of TV Novi Sad executives not to broadcast Pekinška Patka's NORK special saw large coverage in other media, and the band's fans responded to concert cancellations and media bans by spraying "Čonta je Bog!" ("Čonta is God!") graffiti throughout Novi Sad. Several Novi Sad intellectuals publicly defended the band, including famous poet Miroslav Antić, in his column in Dnevnik. Finally, due to the ongoing conflicts between the communist leaderships of the Socialist Autonomous Province of Vojvodina and of the Socialist Republic of Serbia, the criticism and censorship the band was facing in Vojvodina's capital Novi Sad did not influence the band's reception in Serbia's capital Belgrade, where the band continued to hold concerts and enjoy media attention. Several days before the New Year's Eve of 1979, Pekinška Patka performed in Technical Engineering Students' Club in Belgrade together with the band Zvuk Ulice (Sound of the Street).

=== Debut album release (1980) ===
In 1980, the band released their debut album Plitka poezija (Shallow Poetry), a punk rock material with occasional ska elements, composed by Čonkić and Kovačević, The album was recorded in Boris Kovač's studio, and was produced by Slobodan Konjović, who mixed the album in his apartment. Čonkić did not directly deal with political topics in his lyrics; the songs dealt with problems and frustrations of Yugoslav city youth and the band's animosity towards veteran rock acts and disco. The album also included three covers: "Homburg" (originally by Procol Harum), "Stop Stop" (originally by The Hollies) and "Never My Love" (originally by Addrisi Brothers). Plitka poezija was recorded during February and March 1980, but Yugoslav president Josip Broz Tito's illness and eventual death postponed the release until summer. It was ushered in by another 7-inch single, with "Bolje da nosim kratku kosu" ("I Better Wear Short Hair"), which soon became an anthem of Yugoslav punk rockers, and "Ori, ori". Eventually, their debut album was released during the summer, to good reception by the audience, with "Biti ružan, pametan i mlad" and "Bolje da nosim kratku kosu" becoming radio hits, but to mixed reactions of the critics. Part of Yugoslav music critics wrote that the band's sound was not in trend with current tendencies in punk music, comparing the group with 1976 and 1977 British punk rock bands, with some of the critics even describing the band's sound as an imitation or a parody of punk.

One of the first live presentations of the new material was at the Split Festival, where the group performed alongside the band Azra. Several thousand people attended the concert. The relations within the band were somewhat strained at this gig. Dissatisfied with the band's decision to go on tour of Bosnia and Herzegovina, bassist Oslovčan played with his back turned to the crowd, while actively sabotaging the proceedings by purposely making the band sound as bad as possible.

=== Lineup changes, switch to post-punk and disbandment (1981) ===
Following the debut album release, the band underwent personnel changes with some members changing instruments and others leaving altogether. Guitarist Kovačević expressed a desire to play saxophone, so he moved to that instrument, with Zoran "Bale" Bulatović, a 17-year-old former member of Pečat (Stamp), took over the vacated guitar spot. Second guitarist Prosenica and bassist Oslovčan also left the band. On several concerts bass guitar was played by Aleksandar "Caki" Kravić (formerly of Rani Mraz) and then by former bassist Srba Dobanovački, until another former Pečat member, Marinko Vukmanović joined the band. Prosenica's spot stayed vacant as the band continued with only one guitar. That lineup did not last long, as Kovačević left during fall of 1980 to join the two-tone/ska group Kontraritam.

The new Pekinška Patka lineup went on a successful tour of SR Bosnia and Herzegovina, ending with a sold-out show at Sarajevo's Skenderija Hall. The band recorded the cover of the popular Dragan Stojnić chanson "Bila je tako lijepa" ("She Was So Pretty"), with altered lyrics and in the manner of Sid Vicious cover of "My Way", and released it on single with "Buba-rumba" as the B-side. The band further appeared on the Rokenroler III television show on TV Belgrade with the "Stop stop" song from Plitka poezija. Later that year, the show represented Yugoslav Radio Television network at the Montreux Rose d'Or festival. Čonkić also planned to cover Himna Svetom Savi (Hymn to Saint Sava), which was met with disapproval by the rest of the band and ultimately not done.

During December 1980, the band performed at the Grock festival held at the Novi Sad Fair, leaving a good impression but also causing an uproar by burning a copy of Borba, an official newspaper of the League of Communists. Following the show, the band members were summoned to a police station, where Čonkić defended their actions by telling the real course of events: the band did not intend to send a political message; Vukmanović–himself a son of a League of Communists official–wanted to pose on stage as the Statue of Liberty, and used a copy of Borba as a torch due to the newspaper's large format, not being aware that paper he found nearby were the pages of Borba. During the intro for the song "Biti ružan, pametan i mlad", Čonkić ironically dedicated the song to Goran Bregović, the leader of Bijelo Dugme, which was the most popular Yugoslav band at the time. Džuboks music magazine praised the show, while Dnevnik journalist Bogdan Četnik wrote an article demanding that the band be completely banned.

Simultaneously, from October 1980, the band had been preparing new studio material inspired by Joy Division, The Stranglers, The Cure, Magazine and Echo & The Bunnymen. The album songs were authored by Čonkić, Vukmanović and Bulatović. The band originally wrote English language lyrics for the songs, but were eventually pressured by record label to write Serbo-Croatian lyrics. The new studio album, Strah od monotonije (Fear of Monotony), was recorded during March 1981 in Belgrade studio Vem and produced by Konjović. It was released in May 1981, selling only about 8,000 copies.

The band's shift to post-punk and dark wave sound, followed by the change of their image, mostly failed to connect with the audiences in the way their debut album and initial style did. At the shows that followed the album release, audiences showed a lack of interest for the band's new sound, demanding to hear songs from the first album. The band's last notable shows were at a festival at Zagreb Fair (where they performed alongside Riblja Čorba, Haustor, Film, Prljavo Kazalište, Leb i Sol, Parni Valjak, and other bands), and in June 1981 at Rokoteka club in Belgrade's Kalemegdan park, which was their last concert. During the show, Čonkić delivered a lengthy insult-laced verbal tirade directed at Džuboks music critics. During the summer of 1981, Čonkić went to serve his Yugoslav People's Army (JNA) mandatory stint. Prior to his departure, he relayed to the rest of the band his desire of resuming playing with them after his return, but also underscored that they were under no obligation to wait for him if they wanted to continue their careers in other groups. By the time he returned home a year later, Bulatović, Vukmanović and Pihler had already formed post-punk band Luna with vocalist Slobodan Tišma.

=== Post-breakup ===
After Pekinška Patka ended their activity, Čonkić retired from music. In 1994, he emigrated to Toronto, Ontario, Canada with his family. After working as a pizza deliverer, he started working as a computer programmer at Canada's state broadcaster CBC, and eventually got a job as a professor at Seneca College in Toronto. Bulatović moved to New York City during the 1990s.

In 2006, Pekinška Patka's complete discography, including singles and albums, was re-released on the compilation album Pekinška Patka by Multimedia Records.

=== EXIT festival reunion (2008) ===
The 2006 re-release of the band's two albums sparked new interest of the media for the band's work. Discussing the possibility of a reunion, at the time, Čonkić talked of his lack of enthusiasm for such an undertaking: "The band has become a legend of sorts and I wouldn't like [to spoil that by] poking around there too much. We've had several reunion offers, to make some quick cash, but that would have been a betrayal of what we had done [with the band] back in the day". However, in May 2008, it was announced that Pekinška Patka would be reuniting for a performance at the 2008 EXIT festival in their home city Novi Sad. The reunion took place with the band's best-known initial lineup of Čonkić on vocals, Kovačević on guitar, Oslovčan on bass, and Pihler on drums. The reunited band's 30-minute greatest hits set took place on EXIT's main stage on 13 July 2008—the festival's closing night—as part of a lineup featuring Sex Pistols, The Hives, and Ministry. In the interviews immediately after the reunion performance, Čonkić left the door open for a full comeback.

=== Second reunion, copyright / intellectual property dispute (2010–2012) ===
In late April 2010, the band announced its intention to reconvene again for a one-off show on 21 May 2010 at Belgrade's SKC, this time in the lineup that had 29 years earlier recorded the band's second studio album—Čonkić on vocals, Zoran Bulatović on guitar, Marinko Vukmanović on bass, and Laslo Pihler on drums—in order to celebrate the 30th anniversary of the "Bila je tako lijepa" single release. By early May 2010, one more reunion show was added: at Zagreb's Boogaloo club, one day after the Belgrade concert. On 5 May 2010, while promoting the upcoming SKC show at a press conference held in the Makao Chinese restaurant in Belgrade, the reunited band—with Čonkić, Bulatović, Vukmanović, and Pihler on hand—also announced a new single set to be released in early July 2010. They further revealed following year's plans for doing a cover album that was to feature covers of 1960s and '70s competition songs from the Yugoslav pop schlager festivals such as the Opatija Festival, Beogradsko proleće, and Vaš šlager sezone. A week to ten days prior to the Belgrade reunion show, drummer Pihler pulled out of the performance, citing abdominal pain. Scrambling to find a replacement on short notice, the remaining members managed to bring in Veliki Prezir's drummer Robert Radić who, having already been familiar with Pekinška Patka songs, learned the drum parts in only five days.

A few days before the Belgrade concert, Pekinška Patka's co-founding member and first lineup guitarist Sreten Kovačević put out a press release relaying his "consternation" at the band's reunion, which he referred to as "misuse of the [Pekinška Patka] name and legacy by a group of individuals [i.e. Čonkić, Bulatović, Vukmanović, and Radić] that have little to nothing to do with the band". Adding that "Pekinška Patka finished its concert activity for good at Exit 2008", he further stated his own credentials to stem from being the "author and co-author of songs from Plitka poezija, the only authentic Pekinška Patka album" before listing each track's submission code at SOKOJ (Yugoslav Composers' Copyright Agency). Kovačević's press release ends by once again dismissing Čonkić, Bulatović, Vukmanović, and Radić as a "random collection of individuals that decided to book a gathering under the Pekinška Patka name" before threatening legal action should they continue to do so. In response, the band posted a press release of their own on their record label Long Play's official site, disputing Kovačević's claims and attributing them to "either [his] faulty memory or [his] deliberate intent to spread mistruths regarding Pekinška Patka's origins and subsequent work". The release goes on to state that Čonkić is the one who came up with the band's name while further claiming that out of the 16 songs on the first album, Čonkić wrote 5 of them, with Kovačević adding 3 songs, 5 songs being co-authored between the two, and 3 more being covers. It concludes with a claim that back in July 1980, without informing Čonkić and the rest of the bend, Kovačević went to SOKOJ and unilaterally submitted faulty information as each of the original 13 songs (including Čonkić's 5) being co-authored by Čonkić and Kovačević despite even the album sleeve stating otherwise based on the information submitted by the band to their record label, Jugoton.

The setlist at both the Belgrade and Zagreb shows mostly featured tracks from Plitka poezija, though one of their most popular songs "Bolje da nosim kratku kosu" was excluded, likely due to its SOKOJ-listed author Kovačević's complaints. The band also performed the upcoming single, the cover version of "Un año de amor", and the song "Neko" ("Someone") from the second album Strah od monotonije. For the Belgrade show the opening act was the psychobilly act Čikine Bombone, while in Zagreb, Poruka u Prazno opened. In December 2010, the band released a free digital download MP3 version of the single "Un año de amor" on the Long Play record label official site. In December 2011, Pekinška Patka—in the same lineup of Čonkić, Bulatović, Vukmanović, and Radić—held a series of club performances that included Banja Luka's DFK club, return to Zagreb's Boogaloo, Sarajevo's Sloga, and Belgrade's Youth Center.

Following 2010-2012 Pekinška Patka concerts, Kovačević successfully registered Pekinška Patka trademark. Čonkić filed a lawsuit against Kovačević, which resulted in a several-year long court process, won by Kovačević.

Borislav Oslovčan, who, after retiring from music, had been working as a cook on Mykonos, in Malta and in Moscow, died on 5 October 2017.

=== Third reunion, two incarnations of the band (2021–present) ===
In 2021, Kovačević and Pihler reformed Pekinška Patka with vocalist Stefan Stanojević, guitarist Sava Obradović and bass guitarist Igor Mihaljević, performing only songs from Plitka poezija on their concerts in former Yugoslav region and neighboring countries. In 2024, the band performed in Sofia, Bulgaria, with Novi Tsvetya, the first punk rock band to be formed in Bulgaria, as the opening act.

In 2022, a compilation of band-related essays and print interviews—entitled Čovek-patka (Duckman)—was published. Edited by Mirjana Kovačević, it features interviews and pieces written by Sreten Kovačević, Vitomir Simurdić, Peca Popović, Siniša Škarica, Slobodan Konjović, Karolj Kovač, and others.

In 2024, Čonkić, Bulatović and Radić reunited under the name Profesor Čonta i Patka (Professor Čonta and the Duck), with bass guitarist Marko "Ramone" Banović (formerly of Generacija Bez Budućnosti) replacing Marinko Vukmanović, who was prevented from performing due to health issues. The band performs songs from both Plitka poezija and Strah od monotonije.

In a 2024 interview, Čonkić stated about the existence of two incarnations of the group: "It's a little bit complex, but it all comes down to the fact that my former friend and the band's original guitarist Sreta [Kovačević] in a way hijacked the name. We were in court for three to four years. I didn't sue him because I wanted to have all the rights to the name, I just didn't want him to have all the rights, which makes sense. [...] I think what contributed a little bit to my return [to the scene] was partially spite, and partially desire to show that we're far better than this other band [other incarnation of Pekinška Patka]." When asked in a 2025 interview about relationship with Čonkić and about the existence of two incarnations of the band, Kovačević stated: "There's only one Pekinška Patka [...] Every band has the right to play our songs. I'd like to remind you that the band creation was my idea, and that the singer joined in during a later phase. What happened to the singer is a 'disease' called frontman fever, widespread in the world of rock music, but in the other fields as well. For a common man the attention of the media is too large of a pressure, but also a drug. When you get hooked, you don't choose the means to stay afloat. There are numerous examples, but I believe the closest to us are the Sex Pistols, who got rid of their singer out of same reasons."

== Influence and legacy ==
During Pekinška Patka's original run, the band stirred controversy with their live appearances, while simultaneously achieving considerable mainstream popularity, with Čonkić being described by Serbian journalist and author Bogomir Mijatović as one of only two Novi Sad-based musicians who managed to reach the status of a rock star in their home city (the other being Miroslav Nedić, vocalist of the 1960s beat band Zlatni Akordi).

Furthermore, throughout their 1978–1981 run, besides criticism from conservative political and cultural circles in Yugoslavia that scoffed at Pekinška Patka's sophomoric live act, the band were also poorly received by a large section of Yugoslav music critics that considered them lyrically inferior, i.e. not edgy enough, not only compared to notable Anglo-American punk rock acts but also in comparison to the handful of existing Yugoslav punk rockers, like Pankrti and Paraf. After attending the band's 1979 show at Belgrade's Dom Omladine, Džuboks London-based correspondent Svetislav Stojanović a.k.a. Sasha Punkerton dismissed the band as "worthless". Reviewing their cover of Dragan Stojnić's "Bila je tako lijepa", Džuboks journalist Petar Luković stated sarcastically that "compared to Pekinška Patka, Stojnić was a real punk rocker!"

Retrospective write-ups about Pekinška Patka's initial activity have become a lot more favourable. In 2020, music journalist and author Dušan Vesić pontificated that "the only reason [for initial unfavourable music press reviews] might have been the ingrained expectation for punk bands to be rough, fierce and angry, while Pekinška Patka were likeable and jolly." Film director Janko Baljak wrote that the band's first album "resembled a parody of the punk rock genre", before acknowledging the influence the group has had on his generation in turning them onto punk rock, stating: "Bizarrely (but no less importantly), for a number of people from this part of the world, including myself, the first character to introduce us to punk rock wasn't Sid Vicious, but a high school electric engineering teacher, Nebojša Čonkić 'Čonta'". In 2013, journalist Ivan Ivačković wrote about the band: "Just like the [Sex] Pistols on the international scene, Pekinška Patka has on home ground proven that the career doesn't have to be long or important in order for the songs to stand the test of time: from today's point of view, it's clear that the critics were too harsh, and that Pekinška Patka–although it existed for only three years–had left a deep mark in Yugoslav rock music." The group's songs "Biti ružan, pametan i mlad" and "Bolje da nosim kratku kosu" have often been described as anthems of Yugoslav punk rockers.

In the lyrics of his 1980 song "Brat mi fura pank" ("My Brother's Into Punk"), Vatreni Poljubac's Milić Vukašinović—a rock musician usually associated at the time with various flavours of hard rock—made a reference to Pekinška Patka, expressing a sympathetic view of the young punk rockers. Serbian and Yugoslav punk rock band Atheist Rap released the song "Plitka poezija", a medley of songs from Pekinška Patka's first album, on their 1994 debut album Maori i Crni Gonzales (Māori and Black Gonzales). Croatian and Yugoslav punk rock band Hladno Pivo released a cover of Pekinška Patka version of "Bila je tako lijepa" on their 1995 album G.A.D.. The band Final Solutions from Memphis, Tennessee covered Pekinška Patka songs "Kontracepcija" ("Contraception") and "Poderimo rok" on their 2006 7-inch single Return to Motherland. The band Downtown Boys from Providence, Rhode Island recorded a cover of "Poderimo rok" on their 2013 self-titled record.

The album Plitka poezija was polled in 1998 as 77th on the list of 100 greatest Yugoslav popular music albums in the book YU 100: najbolji albumi jugoslovenske rok i pop muzike (YU 100: The Best albums of Yugoslav pop and rock music). In 2015, the same album was polled as 74th on the list of 100 Greatest Yugoslav Albums published by the Croatian edition of Rolling Stone.

In 2000, the song "Bolje da nosim kratku kosu" was polled No.39 on the Rock Express Top 100 Yugoslav Rock Songs of All Times list. In 2006, the same song was polled No.22 on the B92 Top 100 Domestic Songs list.

== Discography ==
- Plitka poezija (1980)
- Strah od monotonije (1981)

== See also ==
- Punk rock in Yugoslavia
- New wave music in Yugoslavia

== Sources ==
- Branislav Smuk: Plitkom poezijom protiv monotonije, Akuzativ.com (in Serbian)
- Dragan Pavlov and Dejan Šunjka: Punk u Jugoslaviji (Punk in Yugoslavia), publisher: IGP Dedalus, Yugoslavia, 1990 (in Serbian, Croatian, and Slovene)
- Janjatović, Petar. Drugom stranom - Almanah novog talasa u SFRJ. (in Serbian)
- Branko Kostelnik - Moj život je novi val, knjiga intervjua, publisher: Fraktura, Zagreb, Croatia, 2004 (in Croatian)
