= Bolje da nosim kratku kosu =

Single by Pekinška Patka

from the album Plitka poezija
- B-side: "Ori, ori"
- Released: 1980
- Recorded: 1980
- Studio: Meta studio, Novi Sad
- Genre: Punk rock
- Length: 2:30
- Label: Jugoton; SY 23683
- Songwriter(s): Nebojša Čonkić, Sreten Kovačević
- Producer(s): Slobodan Konjović

Pekinška Patka singles chronology
"Biti ružan, pametan i mlad" / "Bela šljiva" (1979)	"Bolje da nosim kratku kosu" (1980)	"Bila je tako lijepa" (1980)

"Bolje da nosim kratku kosu" (trans. "I Better Wear Short Hair") is the second single by Serbian and Yugoslav punk rock band Pekinška Patka in 1980. The song, released with the song "Ori, ori" as its B-side, appeared on the band's debut album Plitka poezija. With lyrics written in praise of new wave music, the song became the band's biggest hit, often described as one of the anthems of the closely associated Yugoslav punk rock and Yugoslav new wave scenes.

== Lyrics ==
The lyrical subject declares that "it's late for hard rock", refers to Ian Gillan and Robert Plant, whom he describes as "tired, killed by lots of money", describes new wave as the "fresh blood", and announces his decision to wear short hair.

== Track listing ==
Both tracks by Nebojša Čonkić and Sreten Kovačević.

1. "Bolje da nosim kratku kosu" (2:30)
2. "Ori, ori" (1:56)

== Personnel ==
- Nebojša Čonkić - vocals
- Sreten Kovačević - guitar
- Boris Oslovčan - bass guitar
- Laslo Pihler - drums

== Legacy ==
The song has often been described as one of the anthems of the closely associated Yugoslav punk rock and Yugoslav new wave scenes, appearing on the cult various artists compilation Svi marš na ples! and in the film The Promising Boy.

In 2000, the song was polled No.39 on the Rock Express Top 100 Yugoslav Rock Songs of All Times list. In 2006, the song was polled No.22 on the B92 Top 100 Domestic Songs list.

== Cover versions ==
- Serbian punk rock band Atheist Rap recorded a cover version of the song as a part of the Pekinška Patka covers medley entitled "Plitka poezija", released on their 1994 debut album Maori i Crni Gonzales (Māori and Black Gonzales).
