= Maori i Crni Gonzales =

Studio album by Atheist Rap
- Released: 1994; 1996 (reissue); 2025 (vinyl reissue)
- Recorded: November–December 1992; Do-Re-Mi studio, Novi Sad
- Genre: Punk rock, hardcore punk, pop punk, comedy rock
- Length: 41:12; 63:05 (reissue)
- Label: Scorned Records, Take It Or Leave It Records (reissue), Dostava Zvuka (vinyl reissue)
- Producer: Ljubomir Pejić, Predrag Pejić, Atheist Rap

Atheist Rap chronology
Maori i Crni Gonzales (1994)	Ja eventualno bih ako njega eliminišete (1995)

Alternate cover
- The 1996 reissue cover

Maori i Crni Gonzales is the debut album by the Serbian punk rock band Atheist Rap, released by Scorned Records in 1993. The album, previously available only on compact cassette, was rereleased by Take It Or Leave It Records, featuring bonus material.

== Track listing ==
All music and lyrics written by Atheist Rap. Some of the lyrics and music inspired by Dr Fuzz, Pekinška Patka, Deep Purple, Obojeni Program, Eddy Grant, Lazar Stojanović, Vranešević. Track 1 features the sampled speech of Josip Broz Tito.

No.	Title	Length
1.	"Ljubav" (Love)	3:25
2.	"Blu Trabant" (Blue Trabant)	4:50
3.	"Wartburg limuzina" (Wartburg Limousine)	5:00
4.	"Ritam" (Rhythm)	2:15
5.	"Sarajevo" (Sarajevo)	3:22
6.	"Piloti" (Pilots)	1:26
7.	"Štrikanje" (Knitting)	3:25
8.	"Pomoćni - Đubre!!!" (Assistant - Garbage!!!)	4:22
9.	"U Zmajevom gnezdu" (In The Dragon's Nest)	2:55
10.	"Ora je pravi način da..." (YWA Is The Right Way To...)	4:35
11.	"Plitka poezija" (Shallow Poetry)	5:00

=== Bonus tracks on the 1996 reissue ===
No.	Title	Length
1.	"Ritam (Live)" (Rhythm (Live))	1:58
2.	"Ora je pravi način da... (Live)" (YWA Is The Right Way To... (Live))	4:00
3.	"Ljubav (Live)" (Love (Live))	4:37
4.	"Gusti sok" (Treacle)	3:38
5.	"Stomak eliminator" (Stomach Eliminator)	3:08
6.	"Novosadski vašar" (Novi Sad Fair)	3:08
7.	"Gril 13" (Grill 13)	2:57

== Personnel ==
- Zare (Zoran Zarić; bass)
- Acke (Aleksandar Milovanov; drums)
- Goja (Stevan Gojkov; guitar)
- Radule (Vladimir Radusinović; guitar, vocals)
- Dr. Pop (Aleksandar Popov; vocals)
- Pećinko (Vladimir Kozbašić; vocals)

=== Additional personnel ===
- Voja (artwork by [design])
- Marko Emer (photography))
- Ljuba (Ljubomir Pejić; producer)
- Peđa (Predrag Pejić; producer)
