= Plitka poezija =

Studio album by Pekinška Patka
- Released: 1980
- Recorded: March 1980
- Studio: Meta Sound studio, Novi Sad
- Genre: Punk rock
- Length: 32:13
- Label: Jugoton; LSY 61526
- Producer: Slobodan Konjović

Pekinška Patka chronology
Plitka poezija (1980)	Strah od monotonije (1981)

Plitka poezija (trans. Shallow Poetry) is the debut album by Serbian and Yugoslav punk rock band Pekinška Patka, released in 1980. Although not being the first punk rock album on the Yugoslav rock scene, Plitka poezija is considered the first punk rock album by a band coming from SR Serbia.

In 1998, the album was polled as the 77th on the list of 100 greatest albums of Yugoslav popular music in the book YU 100: najbolji albumi jugoslovenske rok i pop muzike (YU 100: The Best albums of Yugoslav pop and rock music), and in 2015, it was polled as the 74th on the list of 100 Greatest Yugoslav Albums published by the Croatian edition of Rolling Stone.

== Background, recording and release ==
Formed in 1978, Pekinška Patka soon attracted the attention of the Yugoslav public and the media as one of the first punk rock acts in Yugoslavia. During 1978 and 1979, owing to their energetic and transgressive live performances, the band gained large following in their home city of Novi Sad, but also sparked controversy in public, saw criticism from conservative cultural circles and attracted the attention of communist authorities. Following their appearance at the prominent Subotica Youth Festival, the band attracted the attention of the country's record labels. Radio Novi Sad enabled them to record a demo in the radio's studios. At the end of May 1979, with former Teška Industrija leader Gabor Lenđel as the producer, the band recorded a demo with seven songs. The demo would end up unofficially released in 2000 on a 7-inch EP titled Demo 79. The group started negotiating with PGP-RTB label about a debut album, but ultimately could not reach a deal. They eventually signed with Jugoton after its representatives saw them perform at Zagreb's Lapidarij club in July 1979. The group soon released their first record, a 7-inch single with the songs "Bela šljiva" ("White Plum") and "Biti ružan, pametan i mlad" ("To Be Ugly, Smart and Young"), produced by Slobodan Konjović, a well-known disc jockey from Studio B radio station. Prior to the single recording, Konjović had no experience in music production, but the band's frontman Nebojša Čonkić "Čonta" decided to offer him the spot of the producer due to his fascination with Konjović's radio shows Ponoćni rok (Midnight Rock) and Vibracije (Vibrations). Relatively good reception of the single, with 35,000 copies sold, paved the way for Pekinška Patka to begin recording a full-length debut album.

The band recorded material for their debut album at Novi Sad's Meta Studio, owned by composer and multi-instrumentalist Boris Kovač, during February and March 1980. Alongside the band's punk rock songs with occasional ska elements, written by the vocalist Čonkić and guitarist Sreten "Sreta" Kovačević, the album included three covers: "Homburg" (originally by Procol Harum), "Stop Stop" (originally by The Hollies) and "Never My Love" (originally by Addrisi Brothers). The album lyrics dealt with problems and frustrations of Yugoslav city youth and the band's animosity towards veteran rock acts. The album was produced by Konjović, who mixed the recorded material in his own apartment.

Although Plitka poezija was completed by the end of March 1980, Yugoslav president Josip Broz Tito's illness and eventual death postponed the release until summer. It was ushered in by another 7-inch single, with "Bolje da nosim kratku kosu" ("I Better Wear Short Hair") and "Ori, ori".

== Track listing ==
All tracks written by Nebojša Čonkić and Sreten Kovačević except where noted.

Side A
No.	Title	Writer(s)	Length
1.	"Poderimo rock" ("Let's Tear Rock Apart")		1:57
2.	"Homburg"	Gary Brooker; Keith Reid	2:13
3.	"Bolje da nosim kratku kosu" ("I Better Wear Short Hair")		2:30
4.	"Stop Stop"	Allan Clarke; Tony Hicks; Graham Nash	2:10
5.	"Biti ružan, pametan i mlad" ("To Be Ugly, Smart and Young")		1:59
6.	"Ori, ori" ("Plow, Plow")		1:56
7.	"Skakadak"		2:16
8.	"Kratkovidi magarac" ("Shortsighted Donkey")		1:22

Side B
No.	Title	Writer(s)	Length
1.	"Bela šljiva" ("White Plum")		1:56
2.	"Ja sam panker u sakou starom" ("I'm a Punk Rocker in an Old Coat")		1:24
3.	"Kontracepcija" ("Contraception")		1:46
4.	"Šta je zbližilo nas" ("What Made Us Closer")		1:35
5.	"Gledaj, ja sam svoj" ("Look, I Am My Own")		2:42
6.	"Never My Love"	Don Addrisi; Dick Addrisi	2:12
7.	"Ljubav" ("Love")		2:18
8.	"Za Yoko Ono" ("For Yoko Ono")		1:59

== Personnel ==
- Nebojša Čonkić - vocals
- Sreten Kovačević - guitar, backing vocals
- Boris Oslovčan - bass guitar, backing vocals
- Laslo Pihler - drums, backing vocals

=== Additional personnel ===
- Slobodan Konjović - producer, mixing
- Ivan Vlatković - sound engineer
- Marko Pešić - photography

== Reception and legacy ==
The album was released to good reception by the audience, with "Biti ružan, pametan i mlad" and "Bolje da nosim kratku kosu" becoming radio hits, but to mixed reactions of the critics. Part of Yugoslav music critics considered the band's sound outdated, writing that it was not in trend with current tendencies in punk music, comparing the group with 1976 and 1977 British punk rock bands, with some of the critics even describing the band's sound as an imitation or a parody of punk.

Later reviews of the album were much more positive. Journalist and author Dušan Vesić wrote in 2020: "The only reason [for unfavorable reviews] might have been the fact that it was expected from punk bands to be rough, fierce and angry, and Pekinška Patka were likable and jolly." In 1998, Plitka poezija was polled as the 77th on the list of 100 greatest Yugoslav rock and pop albums in the book YU 100: najbolji albumi jugoslovenske rok i pop muzike (YU 100: The Best albums of Yugoslav pop and rock music). In 2015, it was polled as 74th on the list of 100 Greatest Yugoslav Albums published by the Croatian edition of Rolling Stone.

The album songs "Biti ružan, pametan i mlad" and "Bolje da nosim kratku kosu" have often been described as anthems of Yugoslav punk rockers. In 2000, "Bolje da nosim kratku kosu" was polled No.39 on the Rock Express Top 100 Yugoslav Rock Songs of All Times list. In 2006, the same song was polled No.22 on the B92 Top 100 Domestic Songs list.

=== Covers ===
- Serbian and Yugoslav punk rock band Atheist Rap released the song "Plitka poezija", a medley of songs from the album, on their 1994 debut album Maori i Crni Gonzales (Māori and Black Gonzales).
- The band Final Solutions from Memphis, Tennessee covered Pekinška Patka songs "Kontracepcija" ("Contraception") and "Poderimo rok" on their 2006 7-inch single Return to Motherland.
- The band Downtown Boys from Providence, Rhode Island recorded a cover of "Poderimo rok" on their 2013 self-titled record.
