= Homburg (song) =

- Netherlands release picture sleeve

Single by Procol Harum
- B-side: "Good Captain Clack"
- Released: 22 September 1967
- Recorded: Summer 1967
- Genre: Baroque pop
- Length: 3:53
- Label: Regal Zonophone
- Songwriters: Gary Brooker, Keith Reid (lyrics)

Procol Harum singles chronology
"A Whiter Shade of Pale" (1967)	"Homburg" (1967)	"Quite Rightly So" (1968)

"Homburg" is a song by the English rock band Procol Harum, released as the follow-up single to their initial 1967 hit "A Whiter Shade of Pale". Written by pianist Gary Brooker and lyricist Keith Reid, "Homburg" reached number 6 on the UK Singles Chart, number 15 in Canada, and number 34 in the United States. It went to number one in several countries, including the Netherlands. An Italian cover ("L'ora dell'amore" by I Camaleonti) reached number one in the Italian Hit Parade Singles Chart on December 16, 1967, and remained there for 10 weeks.

Reid's "Homburg" lyrics contains the same surreal, dream-like imagery and feelings of resignation and futility as in the debut single. The music also features Matthew Fisher's rich and deep Hammond organ, but the piano and guitar have bigger places in the overall sound. The theme is not as clearly Bach-like as in "A Whiter Shade of Pale"; nevertheless, the single was, on its release, criticised for being too similar to its predecessor. Cash Box said that it is "a solid, slow-paced ballad with the same haunting quality in the melody and lyrics which made 'A Whiter Shade Of Pale' such a big hit."

The title refers to the famous Homburg hat, manufactured in Bad Homburg in Germany.

The B-side of the single is "Good Captain Clack", which is from the album Procol Harum.

== Charts ==
=== Weekly charts ===
Chart (1967–68)	Peak position
Australia (Go-Set)	5
Australia (Kent Music Report)	5
Belgium (Ultratop 50 Flanders)	8
Belgium (Ultratop 50 Wallonia)	6
Canada Top Singles (RPM)	15
Denmark (Danmarks Radio)	6
Germany (GfK)	15
Ireland (IRMA)	4
Italy (Musica e dischi)	2
Japan (Oricon)	86
Malaysia (Radio Malaysia)	2
Netherlands (Dutch Top 40)	1
Netherlands (Single Top 100)	1
New Zealand (Listener)	4
Spain (Promusicae)	17
Sweden (Kvällstoppen)	15
Switzerland	5
UK (Record Retailer)	6
US Billboard Hot 100	34
US Cash Box Top 100	35

=== Year-end charts ===
Chart (1967)	Position
Australia (Kent Music Report)	51
Belgium (Ultratop Flanders)	55
Netherlands (Dutch Top 40)	28
