= Youth work actions =

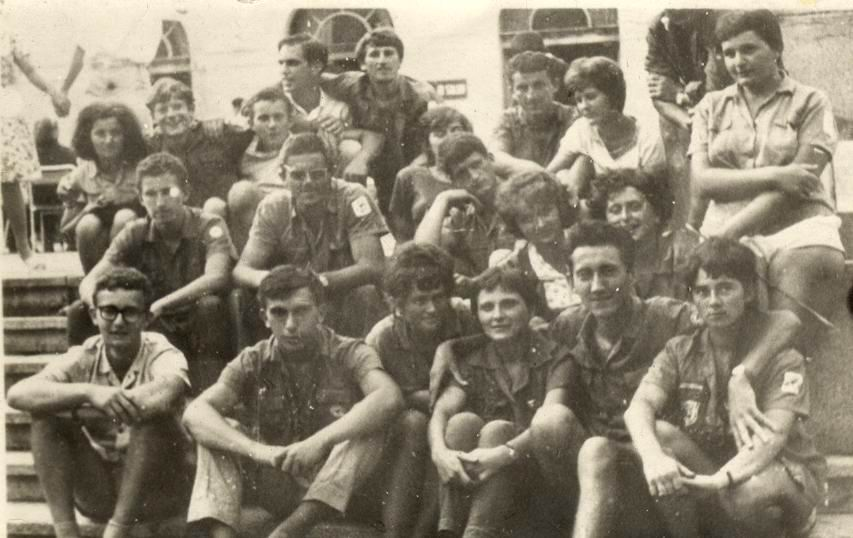
A youth work brigade from the 1960s

Youth work actions (Serbo-Croatian: Omladinske radne akcije, often abbreviated to ORA, Slovene: Mladinske delovne akcije) were organized voluntary labor activities of young people in the Socialist Federal Republic of Yugoslavia. The actions were used to build public infrastructure such as roads, railways, and public buildings, as well as industrial infrastructure. The youth work actions were organized on local, republic, and federal levels by the League of Socialist Youth of Yugoslavia, and participants were organized into youth work brigades, generally named after their town or a local national hero. Important projects built by youth work brigades include the Brčko-Banovići railway, the Šamac-Sarajevo railway, parts of New Belgrade, and parts of the Brotherhood and Unity Highway, which stretches from northern Slovenia to southern Macedonia.

The partisans organized initial actions during World War II in territories liberated by them. After the war, actions were numerous and massive and the youth brigades made significant contributions to the rebuilding of their country, which was badly ravaged by war. In addition to cheap labor for the state, youth work actions provided a form of free holiday for teenagers.

As the country was rebuilt and its economy stabilized, youth work actions went out of fashion. However, they were revived in the late 1970s, in an effort to voluntary organize youth in political and cultural activities, as the work actions proved to play a large role in the socialization of those involved.
