= Bitanga i princeza =

Studio album by Bijelo Dugme
- Released: 16 March 1979
- Recorded: January 1979
- Studio: PGP RTB Studios, Belgrade
- Genre: Hard rock; symphonic rock
- Length: 32:43
- Label: Jugoton
- Producer: Neil Harrison

Bijelo Dugme chronology
Koncert kod Hajdučke česme (1977)	Bitanga i princeza (1979)	Doživjeti stotu (1980)

Bitanga i princeza (transl. "The Brute and the Princess") is the fourth studio album by Yugoslav rock band Bijelo Dugme, released in 1979.

Bitanga i princeza was Bijelo Dugme's first album to feature Dragan "Điđi" Jankelić on drums, who came to the band as a replacement for the band's original drummer, Goran "Ipe" Ivandić It was the band's last hard rock-oriented album before their switch to new wave in the following year.

In 1998, Bitanga i princeza was polled as the 10th on the list of 100 Greatest Yugoslav Rock and Pop Albums in the book YU 100: najbolji albumi jugoslovenske rok i pop muzike (YU 100: The Best Albums of Yugoslav Pop and Rock Music). In 2015, the album was pronounced the 15th on the list of 100 Greatest Yugoslav Albums published by Croatian edition of Rolling Stone.

== Background ==
=== Personnel changes ===
After the joint 1978 departure of drummer Ipe Ivandić and keyboardist Laza Ristovski—who ended up leaving Bijelo Dugme together amid acrimony while working on a side project Stižemo (Here We Come)—the band's former keyboardist Vlado Pravdić returned, while Ivandić was replaced with Điđi Jankelić. Pravdić had previously left the band in fall 1976 to serve his mandatory Yugoslav People's Army stint, at which point Bregović hired Ristovski, however, Pravdić ended up not reclaiming his spot even after being discharged from the army as Bregović decided to keep Ristovski permanently. Jankelić, on the other hand, was completely new to Bijelo Dugme, arriving via appearing on the band's vocalist Željko Bebek's solo album side project Skoro da smo isti (We're Almost the Same) that had been released several months earlier to poor reviews and inferior commercial reception.

The band started preparing their new studio album during early fall 1978 in Niška Banja‚ while Bijelo Dugme's leader Goran Bregović was still serving his mandatory army stint in Niš, but they definitely reunited in Sarajevo on 1 November.

=== Recording sessions and censorship ===
Dragan S. Stefanović's artwork for the original Bitanga i princeza album cover, which Jugoton refused to publish.

Originally, the band's record label, Jugoton, booked London's AIR Studios on Oxford Street (where the band's previous two studio albums had been recorded) for the end of November 1978, with a view of releasing the record in time for New Years holidays in Yugoslavia. However, as it became clear the band would not be able to record in November—and re-booking of AIR Studios could not be arranged on short notice—the recording sessions were moved to Belgrade. The album was recorded during January 1979 in PGP-RTB Studio in Belgrade, followed by the mastering process in London's Abbey Road Studios. Just like the band's previous two studio albums, Bitanga i princeza was also produced by British producer Neil Harrison. It did not feature the band's trademark folk-influenced hard rock sound, as it featured almost no folk music elements, while the ballads "Kad zaboraviš juli" ("Once You Forget July") and "Sve će to mila moja prekriti ruzmarin, snjegovi i šaš" ("All of That, My Dear, Will Be Covered by Rosemary, Snow and Reed") featured a symphonic orchestra.

The making of the album was marked by several instances of censorship. The original cover was designed by Bijelo Dugme's old collaborator Dragan S. Stefanović (who had designed covers for each one of the band's previous albums) featuring a female's leg kicking a male in his genital area. The cover was refused by the band's label, Jugoton, as "vulgar". Stefanović then designed an entirely white album cover, but it was refused by Jugoton editors with the explanation that it would cause the album to be cheaper. The album ended up featuring a cover designed by Jugoton's designer Ivan Ivezić. At the insistence of the label, the verse "Koji mi je moj" ("What the fuck is wrong with me") was excluded from the song "Ala je glupo zaboravit njen broj" ("It's So Stupid to Forget Her Number"), and the verse "A Hrist je bio kopile i jad" ("And Christ was bastard and misery") from the song "Sve će to, mila moja, prekriti ruzmarin, snjegovi i šaš" was replaced with "A on je bio kopile i jad" ("And he was bastard and misery").

The album was released on 16 March 1979.

In April 1979, in an interview for Džuboks magazine, Bregović stated he accepted the label's request to change the lyrics, but that he objected the altering of Stefanović's cover:

It's ridiculous! Some board consisting of five artists and models sits there lecturing the people, telling them what's good and what's not. The [Yugoslav] people kept their composure in the toughest situations imaginable, and now they'll lose their mind when they find themselves in the record shop?!

Bregović addressed the censorship of the "Ala je glupo zaboravit njen broj" and "Sve će to, mila moja, prekriti ruzmarin, snjegovi i šaš" lyrics:

The swearword was dropped during the recording sessions, but this thing with Christ they [Jugoton] explained [it to us] as a 'political thing'. When they say 'political', the argument is over. That's the famous, universal explanation: 'It might cause a political inconvenience'. Although, I really don't see what sort of inconvenience it might've caused. In a country where you're free to believe in Christ, you are also free to be against Christ [...] although that song is not about Christ in any way. [...] He's there only to highlight a picture. The song's intention is not to deal with religion.

In 2005, on the recording of the documentary series Rockovnik, Bregović stated: "Today I probably wouldn't write that verse."

In July 2024, Croatia Records, Jugoton's successor, reissued Bitanga i princeza with the original cover art and new mastering conducted at Abbey Road Studios to mark its 45th anniversary.

== Track listing ==
All songs written by Goran Bregović.

No.	Title	Length
1.	"Bitanga i princeza" ("The Brute and the Princess")	3:46
2.	"Ala je glupo zaboravit' njen broj" ("It's So Stupid to Forget Her Number")	3:53
3.	"Ipak, poželim neko pismo" ("Still, I Wish For A Letter")	4:29
4.	"Kad zaboraviš juli" ("Once You Forget July")	4:29
5.	"Na zadnjem sjedištu moga auta" ("In the Back Seat of My Car")	3:56
6.	"A koliko si ih imala do sad" ("How Many Have There Been?")	4:18
7.	"Sve će to, mila moja, prekriti ruzmarin, snjegovi i šaš" ("All of That, My Dear, Will Be Covered by Rosemary, Snow and Reed")	7:49

== Personnel ==
- Goran Bregović – guitar
- Željko Bebek – vocals
- Zoran Redžić – bass
- Điđi Jankelić – drums
- Vlado Pravdić – keyboard

=== Additional personnel ===
- Neil Harrison – producer
- Maja Odžaklijevska – backing vocals
- Slobodan Marković – synthesizer
- Vojkan Borisavljević – arranged by (track 4)
- Ranko Rihtman – arranged by (track 7)
- Chris Blair – mastered by
- Nick Glennie-Smith – recorded by
- Rade Ercegovac – recorded by
- Ivan Ivezić – design

== Reception and reaction ==
Upon its release, Bitanga i princeza was praised by the critics as Bijelo Dugme's finest work to date, with more-or-less each one of its seven tracks becoming a hit. The album sales outperformed the band's previous releases, with the final number of copies sold reaching 320,000.

The tour following the album release was also successful. The band managed to sell out Belgrade's Pionir Hall five times during late April 1979, donating the entire revenue to the victims fund of the 1979 Montenegro earthquake. On 22 September 1979, the band headlined a large open-air event named Rock spektakl '79. (Rock Spectacle '79) at the JNA Stadium. With more than 70,000 fans in attendance, the concert featured a number of opening acts: Crni Petak, Kilo i Po, Rok Apoteka, Kako, Mama Rock, Formula 4, Peta Rijeka, Čisti Zrak, Aerodrom, Opus, Senad od Bosne, Boomerang, Prva Ljubav, Revolver, Prljavo Kazalište, Tomaž Domicelj, Metak, Obećanje Proljeća, Suncokret, Parni Valjak, Generacija 5 and Siluete.

The album's title song, as well as Bijelo Dugme's prior work, was parodied by the punk band Paraf in the "Pritanga i vaza" track off their 1980 album A dan je tako lijepo počeo....

== Legacy ==
The reactions which followed Bijelo Dugme's mature album and one of the most weighty of Bregović's works included comparisons with Joni Mitchell's contemplative album Blue.

However, the direction of the evolvement was foreshadowed on the previous album, Eto! Baš hoću!, published in 1976, but few people mention Željko Bebek's first solo album, Skoro da smo isti, published in the summer of 1978 (and since forgotten), during the hiatus in Bijelo Dugme's work and Bregović's army stint. It is Bebek who, on his interesting début, his only valuable solo release, coqueted with string orchestra and sophisticated song forms, with, just like on Bitanga i princeza, obvious influences by Genesis latest albums, ...And Then There Were Three... and A Trick of the Tail. The pendulum swung from the simplicity of shepherds' rock and hit singles towards sympho-rock and mature songs from Bitanga i princeza [...]

The diaphanous playing, the motivating rhythmical patterns, the great songs and, above all, the completely different album context, demonstrated that Bijelo Dugme stopped being a teenage attraction, self-willingly becoming a mature band. It was maybe anachronistic in the age of new wave to use a symphonic orchestra (including the following tour), but becoming serious had to be bombastic. Especially when it comes to themes, in introspective love songs about clashes of brutes with princesses, emotional dilemmas in bed, outside of bed, and on the back seat of a car.

The poetic explanation about Christ who was 'a bastard and misery'—probably because he, from the author's point of view, did not manage to redeem anyone–was censored in the song 'Sve će to, mila moja, prekriti ruzmarin, snjegovi i šaš', as it was the case with the exquisite cover by the band's regular designer, Dragan S. Stefanović, replaced with the inferior, unmeaning visual solution.

If we bear in mind the 'shocks' that Bijelo Dugme used to cause before and after that, it all seemed unnecessary, because, before and after that, there was not a domestic album, mainstream and with intimate themes, [...] on which everything fit as harmoniously as on Bitanga i princeza.

-Rolling Stone Croatia in 2015

The album was polled in 1998 as the 10th on the list of 100 Greatest Yugoslav Rock and Pop Albums in the book YU 100: najbolji albumi jugoslovenske rok i pop muzike (YU 100: The Best Albums of Yugoslav Pop and Rock Music).

In 2015, the album was pronounced the 15th on the list of 100 Greatest Yugoslav Albums published by Croatian edition of Rolling Stone.

In 2000, the songs "Bitanga i princeza" and "Sve će to, mila moja, prekriti ruzmarin, snjegovi i šaš" were polled as 14th and 17th respectively on the Rock Express Top 100 Yugoslav Rock Songs of All Times list. In 2006, "Sve će to, mila moja, prekriti ruzmarin, snjegovi i šaš" was polled as 14th on the B92 Top 100 Domestic Songs list.

== Covers ==
- Radio Television Novi Sad Big Band recorded a cover of "Sve će to, mila moja, prekriti ruzmarin, snjegovi i šaš" on their 1980 self-titled album.
- Yugoslav pop trio Aska recorded a Bijelo Dugme songs medley on their 1982 album Disco Rock, featuring, among other Bijelo Dugme songs, "Ipak poželim neko pismo", "Na zadnjem sjedištu moga auta", "Bitanga i princeza" and "A koliko si ih imala do sad".
- Serbian and Yugoslav rock singer Viktorija recorded a cover of "A koliko si ih imala da sad", entitled "Avantura – Ljubomora" ("Adventure – Jealousy"), on her 1995 album Ja znam da je tebi krivo (I Know You're Jealous).
- In 1993, Bregović wrote music for the film Toxic Affair, and "Ipak poželim neko pismo" melody was used in the song "Man from Reno", sung by American singer-songwriter Scott Walker.
- Serbian pop group Moby Dick recorded a cover of "Na zadnjem sjedištu moga auta" on their 1994 album Kreni! (Go!).
- Željko Bebek recorded a version of "Na zadnjem sjedištu moga auta" for his 1995 solo album Puca mi u glavi (My Head is Going to Burst).
- Croatian singer-songwriter Lea Dekleva recorded a cover of "Ipak poželim neko pismo" on her 2005 album emociJA (emotIon).
- Croatian and Yugoslav rock singer Massimo Savić recorded a cover of "Sve će to, mila moja, prekriti ruzmarin, snjegovi i šaš" on his 2006 album Vještina II (Art II).
