= Doživjeti stotu =

Studio album by Bijelo Dugme
- Released: December 12, 1980
- Recorded: October–November 1980
- Studios: Studio VI, Radio Belgrade, Belgrade
- Genres: Rock; new wave; ska
- Length: 32:19
- Label: Jugoton
- Producer: Goran Bregović

Bijelo Dugme chronology
Bitanga i princeza (1979)	Doživjeti stotu (1980)	5. april '81; (1981)

Second version of the cover

Third version of the cover

Doživjeti stotu (transl. "Live to Be 100") is the fifth studio album by Yugoslav rock band Bijelo Dugme, released in 1980.

The album marked the band's shift from their hard rock sound towards new wave. It is the band's second and the last studio album to feature Dragan "Điđi" Jankelić on drums.

Doživjeti stotu was polled in 1998 as the 35th on the list of 100 Greatest Yugoslav Rock and Pop Albums in the book YU 100: najbolji albumi jugoslovenske rok i pop muzike (YU 100: The Best Albums of Yugoslav Pop and Rock Music).

== Background and recording ==
During the late 1970s and early 1980s, the Yugoslav rock scene saw the emergence of a great number of punk and new wave bands. Noting this trend in popular music in the country, Bijelo Dugme leader Goran Bregović reportedly became fascinated with the developing scene based around the emerging bands, especially with the works of Azra and Prljavo Kazalište. During 1980, the band decided to move towards new sound. In December 1980, Bijelo Dugme released new wave-influenced album Doživjeti stotu.

Doživjeti stotu was the first Bijelo Dugme album produced by the band's guitarist and leader Goran Bregović. Unlike the songs from the band's previous albums, which were prepared long before album recording, most of the songs from Doživjeti stotu were created during the recording sessions. As the recordings had to be finished before the scheduled mastering in London, Bregović reportedly resorted to using cocaine in order to stay awake, writing the lyrics in the nick of time. The band's old associate Duško Trifunović wrote lyrics for "Pristao sam biću sve što hoće" ("I Accepted, I'll Be Anything They Want")" and co-wrote lyrics for "Lova" with Bregović. The saxophone on the recording was played by jazz saxophonist Jovan Maljoković and avant-garde musician Paul Pignon; Bregović stated that they originally invited prominent jazz musician Stjepko Gut to play brass sections, but that he turned them down.

From the songs on the album, only the ballads "Pristao sam biću sve što hoće" and "Pjesma mom mlađem bratu" ("A Song for My Little Brother") resembled Bijelo Dugme's old sound. The songs "Ha ha ha" and "Tramvaj kreće (ili kako biti heroj u ova šugava vremena)" ("Streetcar Is Leaving (Or How to Be a Hero in These Lousy Times)") were the first Bijelo Dugme songs to feature political-related lyrics. In accordance with their shift towards new wave, the band changed their hard rock style: the members cut their hair short, and the frontman Željko Bebek shaved his trademark moustache.

== Album cover ==
The provocative cover, which appeared in three different versions, was designed by Mirko Ilić, artist closely associated with the Yugoslav new wave scene. It was the first time that the band's old associate Dragan S. Stefanović did not work on the album cover.

== Track listing ==
All songs written by Goran Bregović, except where noted.

No.	Title	Lyrics	Music	Length
1.	"Doživjeti stotu" ("Live to Be 100")			3:12
2.	"Lova" ("Money")	Duško Trifunović; Goran Bregović	Goran Bregović	2:49
3.	"Tramvaj kreće (ili Kako biti heroj u ova šugava vremena)" ("Streetcar Is Leaving (Or How to Be a Hero in These Lousy Times)")			3:14
4.	"Hotel, motel"			3:33
5.	"Pjesma mom mlađem bratu (iz Niša u proljeće '78)" ("A Song for My Little Brother (from Niš in Spring of '78)")			4:14
6.	"Čudesno jutro u krevetu gđe Petrović" ("A Faboulous Morning in the Bed of Mrs. Petrović")			2:29
7.	"Mogla je biti prosta priča" ("It Could Have Been a Simple Story")			2:47
8.	"Ha, ha, ha"			3:10
9.	"Zažmiri i broj" ("Close Your Eyes and Count")			3:45
10.	"Pristao sam biću sve što hoće" ("I Accepted, I'll Be Anything They Want")	Duško Trifunović	Goran Bregović	3:01

== Personnel ==
- Goran Bregović - guitar, producer
- Željko Bebek - vocals
- Zoran Redžić - bass, wall pro bass
- Điđi Jankelić - drums
- Vlado Pravdić - keyboards, polymoog

=== Additional personnel ===
- Jelenko Milaković - percussion
- Jovan Maljoković - saxophone
- Paul Pignon - saxophone
- Predrag Kostić - trumpet
- Rade Ercegovac - engineer
- Mirko Ilić - design
- Željko Stojanović - photography

== Reception and reaction ==
Immediately after the release, the song "Čudesno jutro u krevetu gospođe Petrović" received a radio ban on some radio and TV stations due to the verse "Sve u finu materinu" (a common swear in Serbo-Croatian).

Due to the radically new sound, the album was met with a lot of negativity. However, as the group prepared to start a tour, bandleader Bregović stated:

It would've been foolish to make this record any different than it is since this is the only way I feel my music at the moment. When I look back, I think this is our first album with this much energy. We're hungry for music and I think our live shows will also be exceptional. The record is all tempo, it's got a lot of text and rhythm and I think the public will like it.

Most of the critics, however, ended up praising the album. In the album review published in Duga magazine, Petar Luković wrote:

What is especially impressive about Bijelo Dugme is their ability to constantly renew their audience. To recruit from the lines of younger listeners, the very people who, through lyrics and visual image, are ready to accept Dugme as representatives of autonomous rock spirit.

In its 1980 year-end poll, based on their readers' votes, Džuboks magazine pronounced Bijelo Dugme the Band of the Year, Željko Bebek the Singer of the Year, the band's keyboardist Vlado Pravdić the Keyboardist of the Year, Điđi Jankelić the Drummer of the Year, the band's bass guitarist Zoran Redžić the Bass Guitarist of the Year, Goran Bregović the Composer, the Lyricist, the Producer and the Arranger of the Year, Doživjeti stotu the Album of the Year, and Doživjeti stotu cover the Album Cover of the Year.

Likely triggered by Bijelo Dugme's sudden shift towards new wave, on his 1981 solo track "Majmuni (Uspomena bjelom dupetu)" off his Parada / Majmuni / Trotoari EP, former Buldožer singer Marko Brecelj denounced various aspects of what he saw to be the basis and legacy of Bijelo Dugme's enormous popularity in Yugoslavia. In the angry, fast-paced punk song, his lyrics pillory the band's "empty words filling the newspapers" and "warm peasant blood that spilled into the box office".

Former Bijelo Dugme drummer Milić Vukašinović ridiculed Bijelo Dugme's new sound and style in the songs "Poštovani ska ska" ("Dear Mr. Ska Ska) and "Živio rock 'n' roll" ("Long Live Rock 'n' Roll"), released on the 1982 album Živio rock 'n' roll by his hard rock band Vatreni Poljubac.

== Legacy ==
It was interesting to observe if Bregović would manage to get out of having to play the music of twenty-year-olds, but at the same time not to write lyrics as someone who is ten years younger than him [...] Doživjeti stotu had new sound, but old messages. Doživjeti stotu wasn't a teenage rebellion, those were the songs of a man who already had a lot of resignation in his lifetime. There weren't big, breathtaking words of love — and that line of pathos which started with "Sanjao sam noćas da te nemam", and went through "Ruzmarin, snjegovi i šaš", could be sensed only in the song 'Hotel, motel'.

— Dušan Vesić in 2014

Doživjeti stotu was polled in 1998 as the 35th on the list of 100 Greatest Yugoslav Rock and Pop Albums in the book YU 100: najbolji albumi jugoslovenske rok i pop muzike (YU 100: The Best Albums of Yugoslav Pop and Rock Music).

== Covers ==
- Yugoslav pop trio Aska recorded a Bijelo Dugme songs medley on their 1982 album Disco Rock, featuring, among other Bijelo Dugme songs, "Zažmiri i broj" and "Doživjeti stotu".
- Serbian rock band Balkan Express recorded a cover of "Pristao sam biću sve što hoće" on their 1998 album Preporučeno (Registered).
- Croatian rock singer Massimo Savić recorded a cover of "Pristao sam biću sve što hoće" on his 2006 album Vještina II (Art II).
