= 5. april '81 =

Live album by Bijelo Dugme
- Released: 1981
- Recorded: 5 April 1981
- Venues: Kulušić, Zagreb
- Genres: Rock; hard rock; new wave; ska
- Length: 33:47
- Label: Jugoton
- Producer: Goran Bregović

Bijelo Dugme chronology
Doživjeti stotu (1980)	5. april '81; (1981)	Singl ploče (1974–1975) (1982)

5. april '81 is the second live album by Yugoslav rock band Bijelo Dugme, released in 1981. It was recorded at Kulušić in Zagreb, SR Croatia on 5 April 1981. The album was originally put out in limited release of only 20,000 copies.

== Background ==
The album was recorded on the last concert of the tour that followed the release of the album Doživjeti stotu (1980). The band was announced by journalist Dražen Vrdoljak (the announcement being featured on the album). The album's sound was in correspondence with the group's shift from hard rock towards new wave the band made with Doživjeti stotu.

The album featured a cover of Indexi song "Sve ove godine" ("All These Years").

== Album cover ==
The cover artwork depicted a three-picture presentation of a girl wearing an adult woman's robe and high heels. The girl photographed was the daughter of actor Mladen Jeličić. Although the album cover saw little controversy in 1981, when 5. april '81 was re-released on CD by Croatia Records in 2003, the image was modified, leaving only the leftmost and rightmost photos, most likely because the girl's genital area is visible in the middle photo.

== Legacy ==
In 1987, in YU legende uživo (YU Legends Live), a special publication by Rock magazine, 5. april '81 was pronounced one of 12 best Yugoslav live albums. In YU legende uživo, critic Petar Janjatović criticized the band's performance on the album, especially Željko Bebek's vocal performance, but also stated:

The album, despite its flaws, represents the band in the last days of their upward faze, and if you can read between the lines, you'll discover the things that made the band really big, important and relevant for this part of the world.

In a 2000 text for Vjesnik, critic Hrvoje Horvat stated:

The live album 5. april '81 from Kulušić shows Bijelo Dugme on the height of their strength and in the attempt to play current post-New Wave trends through Bregović's sound image. However, we are not talking about ruff, violent assemblage, but about natural flow of energy which turned the Doživjeti stotu tour in a simultaneous face lift, rejuvenation and return to the roots.

== Track listing ==
All tracks are written by Goran Bregović, except where noted.

No.	Title	Writer(s)	Length
1.	"Izgledala je malo čudno u kaputu žutom krojenom bez veze" ("She Looked a Little Bit Weird in a Yellow Sillymade Coat")		3:18
2.	"U stvari ordinarna priča" ("In Fact, an Ordinary Story")		3:01
3.	"Ipak, poželim neko pismo" ("Still, I Wish For a Letter")		4:12
4.	"I kad prođe sve, pjevat ću i tad" ("And When Everything Passes, I'll Still Sing")		2:51
5.	"Ne dese se takve stvari pravome muškarcu" ("Those Things Don't Happen to a Real Man")		3:24
6.	"Sve ove godine" ("All These Years")	Enco Lesić; Kemal Monteno	2:28
7.	"Na zadnjem sjedištu moga auta" ("In the Back Seat of my Car")		3:39
8.	"Ha, ha, ha"		3:04
9.	"Bitanga i princeza" ("The Brute and the Princess")		3:45
10.	"Doživjeti stotu" ("Live to be 100")		4:01

== Personnel ==
- Željko Bebek – vocals
- Goran Bregović – guitar, production, mixing
- Zoran Redžić – bass
- Điđi Jankelić – drums
- Vlado Pravdić – keyboard

=== Additional personnel ===
- Dražen Vrdoljak – introduction
- Mladen Škalec – engineering
- Hrvoje Hegedušić – engineering, mixing

== Charts ==
Chart performance for 5. april '81
Chart (2021)	Peak position
Croatian Domestic Albums (HDU)	1
