= Eto! Baš hoću! =

Studio album by Bijelo Dugme
- Released: 20 December 1976
- Recorded: 1–20 November 1976
- Studio: AIR (London, UK)
- Genre: Hard rock; progressive rock; folk rock
- Length: 34:14
- Label: Jugoton
- Producer: Neil Harrison

Bijelo Dugme chronology
| Šta bi dao da si na mom mjestu (1975) | Eto! Baš hoću! (1976) | Koncert kod Hajdučke česme (1977) |

Eto! Baš hoću! (transl. "There! I Will!") is the third studio album by Yugoslav rock band Bijelo Dugme, released in 1976.

Eto! Baš hoću! was the band's first album which was not recorded by the band's default lineup. It did not feature the bass guitarist Zoran Redžić, the drummer Ipe Ivandić and the keyboardist Vlado Pravdić, as at the time all three were serving their mandatory stints in the Yugoslav army. It was the band's first album to feature keyboardist Laza Ristovski, and the band's only album to feature Milić Vukašinović on drums.

In 1998, the album was polled as the 31st on the list of 100 Greatest Yugoslav Rock and Pop Albums in the book YU 100: najbolji albumi jugoslovenske rok i pop muzike (YU 100: The Best Albums of Yugoslav Pop and Rock Music). In 2015, the album was pronounced the 36th on the list of 100 Greatest Yugoslav Albums published by Croatian edition of Rolling Stone.

== Background ==
During 1976, Bijelo Dugme's bass guitarist Zoran Redžić, drummer Ipe Ivandić, and keyboardist Vlado Pravdić all faced hiatus from the band due to receiving call-ups to serve their respective mandatory Yugoslav People's Army stints. Each of them were thus ostensibly temporarily replaced: Formula 4 leader Ljubiša Racić came in place of Redžić, Bregović's former Kodeksi bandmate Milić Vukašinović took over Ivandić's spot, and Pravdić got replaced by Laza Ristovski whose arrival from Smak—Bijelo Dugme's main competitors on the Yugoslav scene at the time—received extensive coverage in the Yugoslav press.

Ahead of the recording sessions, the band came up with a lot of the music and lyrics for the album while sequestered in the Borika village in Eastern Bosnia, thus returning to the location where they had worked on their previous studio album, Šta bi dao da si na mom mjestu, as well. The new album's working title was Sve se dijeli na dvoje, na tvoje i moje (Everything Is Split in Two, Yours and Mine), after a poem by poet and lyricist and Bijelo Dugme's old associate Duško Trifunović. Bregović did not manage to write the music on Trifunović's poem (the lyrics were later used in a song recorded by Jadranka Stojaković), so he instead intended to name the album Hoću bar jednom da budem blesav (For Once I Want to Be Crazy), which Jugoton executives did not like. The album was eventually titled Eto! Baš hoću!. It features eight tracks: hard rock-oriented "Izgledala je malo čudno u kaputu žutom krojenom bez veze" ("She Looked a Little Bit Weird in a Yellow Sillymade Coat"), "Dede bona, sjeti se, de tako ti svega" and title track, blues rock-oriented "Ne dese se takve stvari pravome muškarcu", folk-oriented "Slatko li je ljubit' tajno", simple tune "Ništa mudro" featuring lyrics written by Duško Trifunović), and two ballads, symphonic-oriented "Sanjao sam noćas da te nemam", and simpler "Loše vino", co-written by Bregović and singer-songwriter Arsen Dedić and originally recorded by singer Zdravko Čolić).

Just like Šta bi dao da si na mom mjestu, the album was recorded in London and produced by Neil Harrison. At the recording sessions, the bass guitar was played by the band's vocalist Željko Bebek since Ljubiša Racić had been hired as a touring musician only. The album was released on 20 December 1976, with the cover designed by the band's old associate Dragan S. Stefanović. "Dedicated to soldiers Zoran Redžić, Ipe Ivandić and Vlado Pravdić" was written on the album back cover.

== Track listing ==
All songs written by Goran Bregović, except where noted.

| No. | Title | Lyrics | Music | Length |
|---|---|---|---|---|
| 1. | "Izgledala je malo čudno u kaputu žutom krojenom bez veze" ("She Looked a Little Bit Weird in a Yellow Sillymade Coat") | | | 4:41 |
| 2. | "Loše vino" ("Bad Wine") | Arsen Dedić | Goran Bregović | 2:36 |
| 3. | "Eto! Baš hoću!" ("There! I Will!") | | | 3:52 |
| 4. | "Dede bona, sjeti se, de, tako ti svega" ("Come on, Remember, for God's Sake") | | | 4:56 |
| 5. | "Slatko li je ljubit' tajno" ("It's So Sweet to Kiss Secretly") | | | 4:37 |
| 6. | "Ništa mudro" ("Nothing Smart") | Duško Trifunović | Goran Bregović | 2:32 |
| 7. | "Ne dese se takve stvari pravome muškarcu" ("Those Things Don't Happen to a Real Man") | | | 4:08 |
| 8. | "Sanjao sam noćas da te nemam" ("Last Night I Dreamed that I Didn't Have You") | | | 6:46 |

== Personnel ==
- Goran Bregović – guitar
- Željko Bebek – vocals, bass guitar
- Milić Vukašinović – drums
- Laza Ristovski – keyboard

=== Additional personnel ===
- Benjamin Newson – alto saxophone
- Raphael Ravenscroft – tenor, baritone and alto saxophone
- Alf Waite Jr. – trombone
- David Defries – trumpet
- Joy Yates – backing vocals
- Stevie Lange – backing vocals
- Val Stokes – backing vocals
- Neil Harrison – producer
- Jon Kelly – recorded by
- Jon Walls – recorded by
- Chris Blair – mastered by
- Dragan S. Stefanović – design
- Veljko Despot – photography

== Reception ==
The album's main hits were "Izgledala je malo čudno u kaputu žutom krojenom bez veze", "Loše vino", "Dede, bona, sjeti se, de, tako ti svega", "Slatko li je ljubit' tajno" and "Sanjao sam noćas da te nemam".

In a review, critic Darko Glavan stated that Eto! Baš hoću! is a "magnificent record, without any doubt the best thing that Bregović has offered to his fans by now".

== Legacy ==
The transformation of Yugoslav rock into a profitable activity and discovery of the authentic expression that could communicate with the mass audience — unlike the pretentious nonsense of earlier "progressive" and boring YU rockers — together with excellent hit songs, was probably the main success of Bijelo Dugme's first phase, "shepherds' rock", which concluded with their second album, Šta bi dao da si na mom mjestu. Their third album, Eto! Baš hoću!, released in 1976, demonstrated how only three years since the beginning of their career, the band members had serious intentions and could do things differently. Eto! Baš hoću! was a record of modern, thick sound straight from London studios, with a different approach and concept [...]

White reggae, mixed with remains of folk, impeccable sound, rebellious title track and epic conclusion, "Sanjao sam noćas da te nemam", anticipated the following chapter, Bitanga i princeza. Some of the songs, like 'Ništa mudro' and 'Ne dese se takve stvari pravome muškarcu', used classic Bo Diddley's riff much better that corny "Ne spavaj, mala moja, muzika dok svira" [from the band's debut album] inspired by Chuck Berry's "Rock and Roll Music", while the excellent opening track, "Izgledala je malo čudno", and previously mentioned songs displayed Bregović's new approach to lyrics and non-pathetic love songs. If we add intentionally minimalist "Loše vino" (in contrast to Zdravko Čolić's far more commercial version), even the remains of folk in "Slatko li je ljubit' tajno" sounded like witty combination of Jamaican reggae and shepherds' mischief, charming also because of possibly the best sound on a Dugme album.

-Rolling Stone Croatia in 2015

The album was polled in 1998 as the 31st on the list of 100 Greatest Yugoslav Rock and Pop Albums in the book YU 100: najbolji albumi jugoslovenske rok i pop muzike (YU 100: The Best Albums of Yugoslav Pop and Rock Music).

In 2015, the album was pronounced the 36th on the list of 100 Greatest Yugoslav Albums published by Croatian edition of Rolling Stone.

The song "Sanjao sam noćas da te nemam" was polled in 2000 as the 31st on Rock Express Top 100 Yugoslav Rock Songs of All Times list. The song "Loše vino" was polled in 2006 as the 34th on B92 Top 100 Yugoslav songs list.

=== Covers ===
- Yugoslav pop trio Aska recorded a Bijelo Dugme songs medley on their 1982 album Disco Rock, featuring, among other Bijelo Dugme songs, "Izgledala je malo čudno u kaputu žutom krojenom bez veze".
- Serbian and Yugoslav rock band Revolveri recorded a cover of "Ništa mudro" on their 1990 EP Sever i jug (North and South), with Dušan Prelević on vocals as guest.
- Bosnian and Yugoslav pop rock band Regina recorded a cover of "Izgledala je malo čudno u kaputu žutom krojenom bez veze" on their 1991 album Ljubav nije za nas (Love Is Not for Us).
- Croatian singer-songwriter and former Azra leader Branimir "Džoni" Štulić released a cover of "Sanjao sam noćas da te nemam" on his official YouTube channel in 2012.
