= Šta bi dao da si na mom mjestu =

Studio album by Bijelo Dugme
- Released: 17 December 1975
- Recorded: 8–23 November 1975
- Studio: AIR (London, UK)
- Genre: Hard rock; progressive rock; folk rock
- Length: 34:22
- Label: Jugoton
- Producer: Neil Harrison

Bijelo Dugme chronology
Kad bi' bio bijelo dugme (1974)	Šta bi dao da si na mom mjestu (1975)	Eto! Baš hoću! (1976)

Šta bi dao da si na mom mjestu (transl. "What Would You Give to Be in My Place" – transl. "Wouldn't You Like to Be in My Place") is the second studio album from the Yugoslav rock band Bijelo Dugme, released in 1975.

The album was polled the 17th on the 100 Greatest Yugoslav Rock and Pop Albums list in the 1998 book YU 100: najbolji albumi jugoslovenske rok i pop muzike (YU 100: The Best Albums of Yugoslav Pop and Rock Music). In 2015, the album was pronounced the 42nd on the list of 100 Greatest Yugoslav Albums published by the Croatian edition of Rolling Stone.

== Background and recording ==
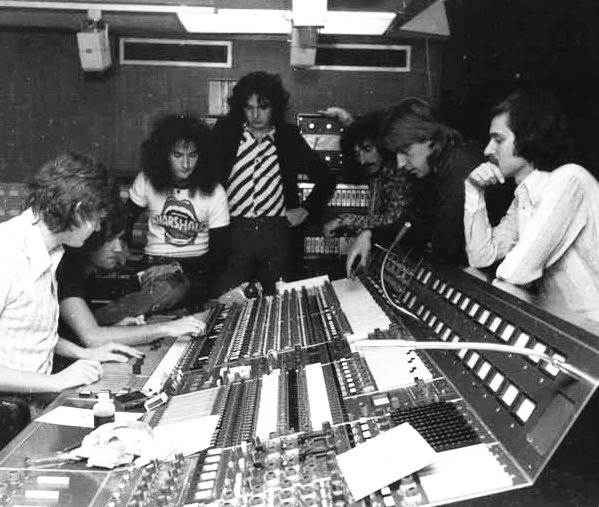
Bijelo Dugme and collaborators in London's AIR Studios on Oxford Street in November 1975 during the album recording; from left to right: sound engineer Peter Henderson, producer Neil Harrison, Ipe Ivandić, Goran Bregović, Željko Bebek, Vlado Pravdić, and Jugoton executive Veljko Despot.

In the fall of 1975, after the huge commercial and critical success of Bijelo Dugme's debut album, Kad bi' bio bijelo dugme, as well as the successful tour that followed it, the band went to the Borike village in Eastern Bosnia to work on songs for their eagerly-awaited next studio album.

The album recording sessions started in November 1975, in London, with production done by Neil Harrison, an EMI staff producer and A&R employee, who had previously worked with Cockney Rebel and Gonzalez. The bass guitar on the album was played by the band's vocalist, Željko Bebek, as the bass guitarist Zoran Redžić injured his middle finger just before the album recording started. Nevertheless, Redžić is credited on the album, as he worked on the bass lines, and directed Bebek during the recording. At the time, in the same studios, Roxy Music worked on their album Siren. The members of the band on several occasions visited Bijelo Dugme's recording sessions, expressing likes for Bijelo Dugme's songs.

During the AIR studio sessions, the band recorded an English language song, "Playing the Part", which was not included on the album. It was released as a limited edition promo single distributed to English journalists. "Playing the Part" lyrics were written by Dave Townsend. Looking for a lyricist to come up with the English language lyrics, Jugoton executive Veljko Despot who accompanied the band in London, contacted an artists agency that sent Townsend over.

== Album cover ==
The album cover was designed by Dragan S. Stefanović, who had also designed the cover of the band's previous album. The photograph featured Zoran Redžić's girlfriend at the time.

== Track listing ==
All the songs were written by Goran Bregović, except where noted.

No.	Title	Lyrics	Music	Length
1.	"Tako ti je, mala moja, kad ljubi Bosanac" ("That's How It Is, Baby, When You Kiss a Bosnian")			3:52
2.	"Hop-cup" ("Whoopsie Daisy")			2:18
3.	"Došao sam da ti kažem da odlazim" ("I'm Here to Tell You that I'm Leaving'")			3:36
4.	"Ne gledaj me tako i ne ljubi me više" ("Don't Look at Me like That and Kiss Me No More")			6:46
5.	"Požurite, konji moji" ("Hurry Up, My Horses")			7:17
6.	"Bekrija si cijelo selo viče, e pa jesam, šta se koga tiče" ("The Whole Village Says I'm a Tippler, So What If I Am, It's None of Anyone's Business")			2:47
7.	"Šta bi dao da si na mom mjestu" ("What Would You Give to Be in My Place")	Duško Trifunović	Goran Bregović	7:42

== Personnel ==
- Goran Bregović - guitar, harmonica
- Željko Bebek - vocals, bass guitar
- Zoran Redžić - bass guitar
- Ipe Ivandić - drums
- Vlado Pravdić - organ, synthesizer, electric piano, piano

=== Additional personnel ===
- Neil Harrison - producer
- Peter Henderson - engineer
- Chris Blair - mastered by
- Dragan S. Stefanović - design, photography

== Reception ==
The album was a huge commercial success in Yugoslavia, selling more than 200,000 copies, and the songs "Tako ti je, mala moja, kad ljubi Bosanac", "Došao sam da ti kažem da odlazim", "Ne gledaj me tako i ne ljubi me više" and "Požurite, konji moji" becoming nationwide hits. After the first 50,000 records sold, Šta bi dao da si na mom mjestu became the first Yugoslav album to be credited as a diamond record. After selling more than 100,000 copies, it became the first platinum record in the history of Yugoslav discography, and after reaching the 200,000 copies mark it was branded simply as "2× diamond record".

=== New Year's performance for Tito ===
Right after the album's release, its initial promotion was scheduled to take place at a New Year's 1976 concert at Belgrade's Hala sportova along with Pop Mašina, Buldožer and COD as opening acts. However, five days before New Year's, the band canceled their appearance at the Belgrade concert due to getting invited to perform for Yugoslav president Josip Broz Tito at the Croatian National Theatre (HNK) in Zagreb as part of the New Year's celebration there.

The performance for the eighty-three-year-old president did not go according to what the band had expected, as recounted by Bregović in various media appearances after the dissolution of Yugoslavia:

From what we gathered, the reason he had even heard of us were some of his grandchildren who liked singing along to "Tako ti je, mala moja, kad ljubi Bosanac" so his handlers figured he'd enjoy hearing that in person. [...] We were already playing when Tito and Jovanka walked into the theater to take their seats and within seconds he covered his ears because he couldn't bear the noise. That was an immediate signal to the presidential protocol people who started shushing us: 'Quieter, quieter' followed by an order of 'Stop the whole thing' not even a minute later. We were hustled off stage and they brought on opera and ballet... So that was our performance for Tito—twenty bars of music. [...] Another impression from that night was the erotic energy I felt hanging in the air the moment Tito and Jovanka walked in the theater. The backstage area was full of ballerinas and female choir singers and you could hear audible moans in this almost hysteric excitement — that's when I realized what a turn-on power is for women.

In the years since, Bebek also looked back on the band's performance for Tito. In 1976, months after the performance, he wrote for Džuboks magazine about the personal feelings the event stirred in him. In the published piece, the singer expresses exhilaration at getting the opportunity to perform for "the most respected and dearest guest" while drawing parallels to the excitement of his only prior in-person sighting of Tito during his adolescence at the Relay of Youth running in Sarajevo. However, during a 2018 television interview, he recalled Bijelo Dugme's performance for Tito much differently:

Our manager [Vladimir] Mihaljek told us: 'They called from the presidency, you guys have to play for Tito at the HNK in Zagreb for New Years' and we were like: 'OK, if we must'. The problem was that we had already been booked for a show in Belgrade that was going to earn us the equivalent of $100,000 in today's money—a very lucrative sum for a single show that would have been great for our lacklustre financial bottom line at the time. But Tito's guys were reassuring us with: 'Oh no, no problem, no need to feel bad about cancelling the Belgrade gig because you're going to get paid here'. And we did get paid but it was only $2,000. We showed up at HNK the day before the show and we weren't allowed to leave until the day after. They stuck us in the theater basement and the security would neither let us go outside nor move around inside the building. We were basically sequestered in HNK's basement for two days. They brought us up onto the stage like rats and then it was right back down following the short performance of 'Patim, evo, deset dana'. It was humiliating. The whole experience left a very bitter taste in my mouth. As for the impression we left on him, he couldn't have cared less about us. He puffed on his pipe, exhibiting very little interest in who we were and what we did.

There have been reports in Yugoslav press that Bijelo Dugme's performance for Tito may have had something, at least in part, with the band manager Mihaljek's sudden firing that occurred weeks prior. Mihaljek was reportedly contacted in December 1975 by Tito's Yugoslav presidential protocol staffers who weren't aware about Mihaljek no longer representing the band. Knowing that Bijelo Dugme had already been booked for a lucrative New Year's show in Belgrade and being aware that a verbal commitment to the Yugoslav Presidency would have to be honoured one way or another (even if it meant canceling the already arranged Belgrade appearance to the band's financial detriment), Mihaljek reportedly decided to get back at his former clients by accepting the presidential invitation despite not being authorized to do so. Discussing Mihaljek's reportedly underhanded role in the band's performance for Tito, journalist Dušan Vesić said: "Even if Mihaljek managed to exact some revenge by making them lose all that money, he unwittingly ended up doing them a long term favour because being seen performing for Tito sent a powerful implicit signal to all the executive aparatchiks on Yugoslav television that the band is now untouchable when it comes to TV appearances in Yugoslavia".

=== Tour ===
The tour following the album release was very successful. It featured three sold-out concerts in Belgrade's Pionir Hall in early February 1976. The tour confirmed and furthered Bijelo Dugme's standing as the most popular band in Yugoslavia, a status they had previously achieved with the success of their debut album. Yugoslav print journalists coined the term "Dugmemanija" (Buttonmania) that began to be used frequently as the public in the socialist country observed a new cultural phenomenon.

=== In popular culture ===
The album's record-breaking sales as well as the enormous popularity of the "Tako ti je, mala moja, kad ljubi Bosanac" track among all strata of Yugoslav society, in addition to its heavy rotation on Yugoslav radio, prompted film director Soja Jovanović to include the hit song in her Television Belgrade-produced 1976 comedy TV film Izvinjavamo se, mnogo se izvinjavamo (Sorry, Terribly Sorry), centered around the prizewinning farmer Milić Barjaktarević (played by Slobodan Đurić) on his way to an agricultural fair in Belgrade while on constant lookout for a woman to marry and take back to his village. The song becomes somewhat of a plot point in the train scene as Milić turns on his pocket radio, hears "Tako ti je, mala moja, kad ljubi Bosanac", and instantly starts rocking out to it in a clumsy attempt of wooing his more refined fellow passenger Borka (Milena Dravić).

== Legacy ==
The album was polled in 1998 as the 17th on the list of 100 Greatest Yugoslav Rock and Pop Albums in the book YU 100: najbolji albumi jugoslovenske rok i pop muzike (YU 100: The Best Albums of Yugoslav Pop and Rock Music).

The title track was polled in 2000 as the 68th on the Rock Express Top 100 Yugoslav Rock Songs of All Times list.

In 2014, author and director Dušan Vesić wrote a biography of Bijelo Dugme, entitled Bijelo Dugme: Šta bi dao da si na mom mjestu. In the book, Vesić wrote:

It [the album] had a fantastic title, and it is the life maxim of Bijelo Dugme. If I had to explain Bijelo Dugme in one sentence, that would be it: 'Wouldn't you like to be in my place?'

In 2015, Šta bi dao da si na mom mjestu album cover was ranked 10th on the list of 100 Greatest Album Covers of Yugoslav Rock published by web magazine Balkanrock. In 2015, the album was pronounced the 42nd on the list of 100 Greatest Yugoslav Albums published by Croatian edition of Rolling Stone.

=== Covers ===
- Yugoslav pop trio Aska recorded a Bijelo Dugme songs medley on their 1982 album Disco Rock, featuring among others, "Požurite, konji moji".
- Serbian and Yugoslav pop singer Neda Ukraden recorded a cover of "Hop-cup" on her 1995 album Između ljubavi i mržnje (Between Love and Hate).
- Bosnian turbo folk singer Selma Bajrami recorded a cover of "Požurite, konji moji", with altered lyrics and entitled "Sviće dan" ("Dawn Is Coming"), on her 1999 album Ljubav si ubio, gade (You Killed Love, You Bastard).
- Serbian and Yugoslav rock singer Viktorija recorded a cover of "Došao sam da ti kažem da odlazim" on her 2000 album Nostalgija (Nostalgia).
- Macedonian composer Vasko Serafimov recorded a cover of "Došao sam da ti kažem da odlazim" on his 2006 album Here.

=== Plagiarism claims ===
In 2010s, articles appeared in Balkan media claiming that the album's title track plagiarizes the song "I Am the Dance of Ages" by the British rock band Argent, released on their 1972 album All Together Now.
