= Ljubiša Racić =

Bosnian and Yugoslav guitarist and singer

- Born: 20 January 1954 (age 72); Sarajevo, PR Bosnia and Herzegovina, FPR Yugoslavia
- Genres: Rock; hard rock; progressive rock
- Occupations: Singer; guitarist; songwriter
- Instruments: Vocals; guitar; bass guitar
- Years active: Late 1960s–present
- Labels: PGP-RTB, Diskoton
- Formerly of: Formula 4; Bijelo Dugme

Ljubiša Racić (born 20 January 1954) is a Bosnian and Yugoslav semi-retired rock musician, known as the vocalist and guitarist of the hard rock band Formula 4 and as a part-time bass guitarist for the highly popular rock band Bijelo Dugme.

== Biography ==
=== Early career ===
Racić started his career in the late 1960s, performing with the bands Mladi Lavovi (The Young Lions), Albatros (Albatross) and VIS Oni (Vocal Instrumental Ensemble Them).

=== Formula 4 (1970–1979) ===
Racić formed the hard rock band Formula 4 in 1970. The first lineup of the band featured Racić on vocals and guitar, Brano Likić on bass guitar, Zlatko Nikolić on rhythm guitar and Senad Begović on drums. The band quickly gained attention with Racić's trademark leopard print suit and energetic stage performances, and with their versions of classical pieces. Despite never managing to achieve larger popularity, during the 9 years of the band's existence, they regularly held performances in Sarajevo, releasing two 7-inch singles – the first one, with the songs "Kakvo veče" ("What An Evening") and "Oproštaj s tobom" ("Farewell to You"), released in 1976 through PGP-RTB, and the second, with the songs "Mladi smo, mladi mi" ("Young, We Are Young") and "Nikom nije tako kao što je meni" ("No One Has It Going Like I Do"), released in 1979 through Diskoton. As Racić's father worked in the management of FK Željezničar Sarajevo football club, in 1974, Formula 4 performed on Koševo Stadium during the half-time of the match between FK Željezničar and Red Star Belgrade, in front of some 30,000 people. During their career, the band went through several lineup changes, with different lineups featuring later-prominent musicians Sanin Karić and Điđi Jankelić. After performing as an opening band on Riblja Čorba's concert at Tašmajdan Stadium held on 1 September 1979, Formula 4 ended their activity.

=== Bijelo Dugme (1976) ===
At the beginning of 1976, Racić became a touring member of the highly popular band Bijelo Dugme. He was hired as a temporary replacement for the band's bass guitarist Zoran Redžić, who was at the time serving his mandatory stint in the Yugoslav People's Army. During 1976, Racić went on a Yugoslav tour with the group, but did not take part in the recording of the band's 1976 studio album Eto! Baš hoću!, the recording sessions featuring the band's vocalist Željko Bebek playing bass guitar. After spending several months with the band, Racić asked for higher fees, after which he was fired and replaced by former Teška Industrija member Sanin Karić.

=== Later career ===
With the outbreak of Yugoslav Wars in 1991, Racić moved to Germany, where he started his boat building business. During the 2000s and 2010, he occasionally reformed Formula 4 for live performances.

== Discography ==
=== With Formula 4 ===
==== Singles ====
- "Kakvo veče" / "Oproštaj s tobom" (1976)
- "Mladi smo, mladi mi" / "Nikom nije tako kao što je meni" (1979)
