= Mama Rock =

- Also known as: Mama Rok; Mamma Rock
- Origin: Niš, Serbia
- Genres: Rock, blues rock, hard rock, folk rock
- Years active: 1977 – 1982; 1983 – 1992; 2000 – 2012
- Labels: Diskos, PGP-RTB, PGP-RTS, Take It Or Leave It Records, Raglas Records

Mama Rock is a Serbian and former Yugoslav rock band, best known for their hit ballad "Eva".

== History ==
=== 1977 - 1992 ===
History of Mama Rock begins with band Viktorija (not to be confused with Serbian rock singer Viktorija and her support band) whose members were Stojanović brothers, Zoran "Ciga" and Dragomir, and Nikolić brothers, Bane and Mirko, and which won the first place at 1974 Gitarijada music festival. In 1977 drummer Šomi and guitarist Slobodan Krnić joined Stojanović and Nikolić brothers and formed Mama Rock. The same year the band won jury's award at the Gitarijada festival and recorded single with songs "Vranjanka" and "Pismena vežba" which was released through Diskos.

In 1978 the band got new vocalist, Zoran "Stoka" Stojković, a former Istok member, and recorded single with songs "Buđenje u 7" and "Eva" produced by Goran Bregović. In 1979 the band performed at Bijelo Dugme's Rock spektakl '79 held on JNA Stadium and toured with Bijelo Dugme as an opening band. Just before the planned recording of Mama Rock's third single Josip Broz Tito died, and the recording was postponed. The recording started some six months later with the vocalist, Dragan "Nune" Nikolić, as Zoran Stojković had to leave the band due to his army obligations. Single with songs "Život moj" and "Tebi smeta sve" was released in 1981. In 1982 band went on hiatus because all of the members went to serve Yugoslav People's Army.

In 1983 the band reunited and recorded songs which would be released on their first full-length album Pokreni me (Move Me) two years later. In 1987 the band toured with Željko Bebek and Zdravko Čolić and had numerous concerts outside Yugoslavia. At this time Zoran "Ciga" Stojanović and Zoran "Stoka" Stojković remained the only permanent members (Stojanović remaining the only original member) and worked with a number of younger musicians. Mama Rock disbanded at the beginning of Yugoslav wars. Stojanović became a studio musician and Stojković became frontman of the band Riff.

=== 2000 - present ===
In 2000 the band reunited and released EP Buđenje (Awakening). After celebrating 25 years of existence (although the band made several breaks in their work) in 2002, the band recorded eight songs which were performed during the past years but were never recorded. The songs were released, alongside band's old hits "Buđenje", "Eva" and "Pokreni me", in 2007 on the album The Best Of. In 2007 Mama Rock performed on the Peace Festival, headlined by Glenn Hughes, in Dimitrovgrad, Serbia.

On November 7, 2012, Zoran Stojanović died. He was 59.

== Discography ==
=== Studio albums ===
- Pokreni me (1985)

=== EPs ===
- Buđenje (2000)

=== Compilation albums ===
- The Best Of (2007)

=== Vinyl singles ===
- "Pismena vežba" / "Vranjanka" (1977)
- "Naručiću, mala, buđenje u sedam" / "Eva" (1978)
- "Život moj" / "Tebi smeta sve" (1981)
