= Duško Trifunović =

Bosnian-Serb writer (1933–2006)

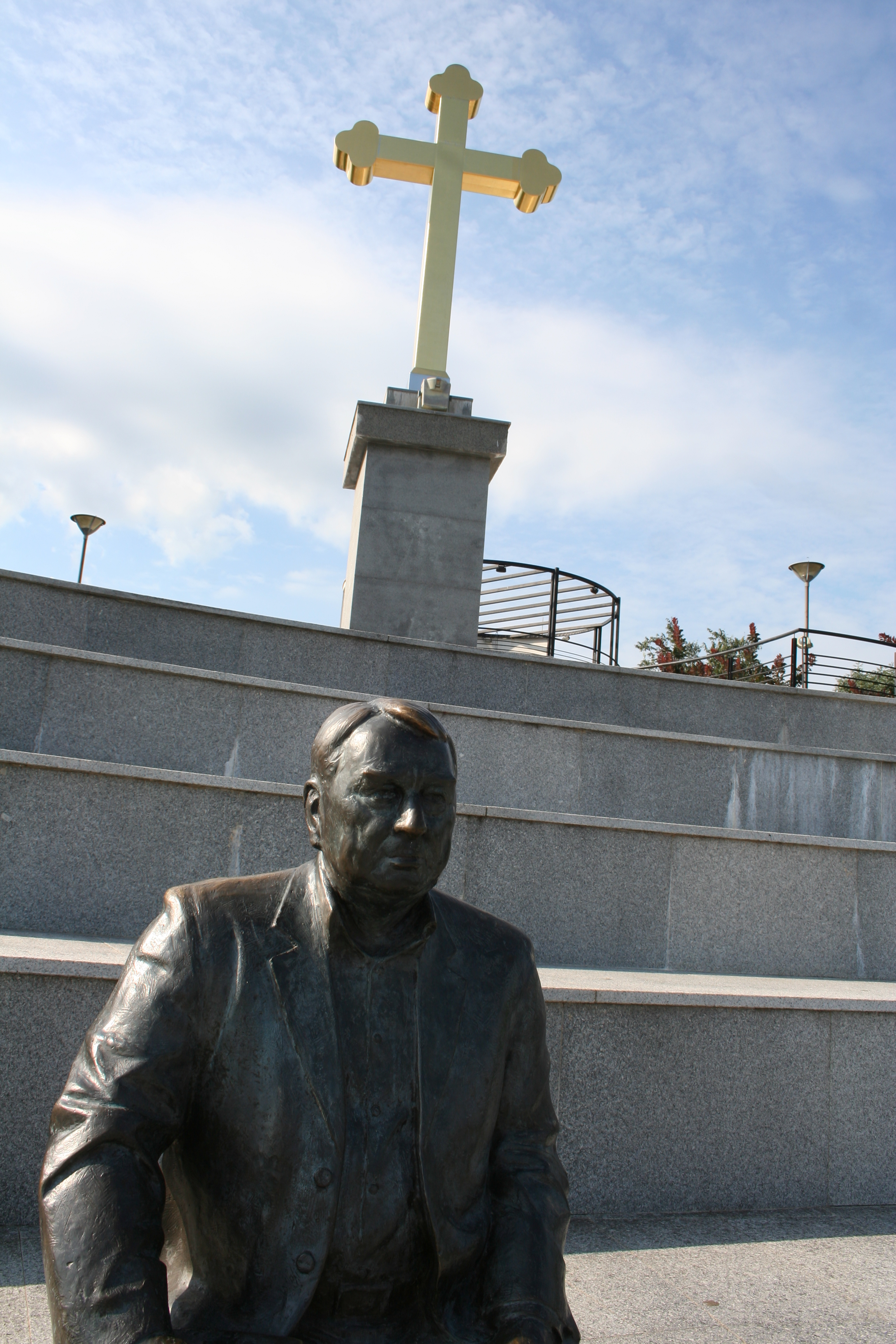
- Duškov Vidikovac monument in Sremski Karlovci
- Born: Duško Trifunović; 13 September 1933; Sijekovac, Kingdom of Yugoslavia
- Died: 28 January 2006 (aged 72); Novi Sad, Serbia and Montenegro
- Occupations: Poet and author
- Writing career
- Period: 1958–2006

Duško Trifunović (Serbian: Душко Трифуновић, 13 September 1933 – 28 January 2006) was a Serbian and Yugoslav writer, poet and television author.

== Life ==
Born in the small village of Sijekovac near Bosanski Brod (then part of the Vrbas Banovina, Kingdom of Yugoslavia), to father Vaso and illiterate mother Petra. His father died from tuberculosis in 1945.

Trifunović did not have much formal schooling since he started working in a factory during his early teens. Working as a locksmith affixing train wagon doors, he eventually moved to Sarajevo in 1957 at the age of 24 to continue the same line of work. Parallel to his factory work, he also secretly wrote poetry and once in Sarajevo finally got a chance to pursue it in earnest. He published his first book in 1958, and over the next 48 years wrote 84 poetry books, four novels, and several dramas.

He also wrote over 300 song lyrics, most notably for Bijelo dugme (nation-wide hits "Ne gledaj me tako i ne ljubi me više" "Šta bi dao da si na mom mjestu", "Doživjeti stotu", "Pristao sam biću sve što hoće", and "Ima neka tajna veza", as well as other tracks like "Glavni junak jedne knjige" and "Ništa mudro"), Indexi (hit "I pad je let"), Zdravko Čolić (hit "Glavo luda"), Vajta (hit "Zlatna ribica"), Jadranka Stojaković, Neda Ukraden, and Željko Joksimović ("Ima nešto u tom što me nećeš").

Trifunović also authored several children's books and created several children programs for Televizija Sarajevo, the most prominent being Šta djeca znaju o zavičaju (What children know about the homeland).

Since 1992, he divided his time between Novi Sad and Sremski Karlovci in Serbia, working on Radio Television Novi Sad (RTNS) until retirement. He received Branko's award, City of Sarajevo April 6 Award, Federal and many other acknowledgments.

He died on 28 January 2006 in Novi Sad (at the time Serbia and Montenegro) at the age of 72, and was interred at the Čerat Cemetery in Sremski Karlovci where he had lived during the last years of his life.

== Selected bibliography ==
- Tajna veza, selected poems (1994)
- Veliko otvorenje (2000)
- Gola seča, novel (2002)

== Filmography (screenplays) ==
- Ram za sliku moje drage (1968)
- Život je masovna pojava (1970)
- Adam Ledolomac (1990)
