= Borika =

Borika Борика
- Village
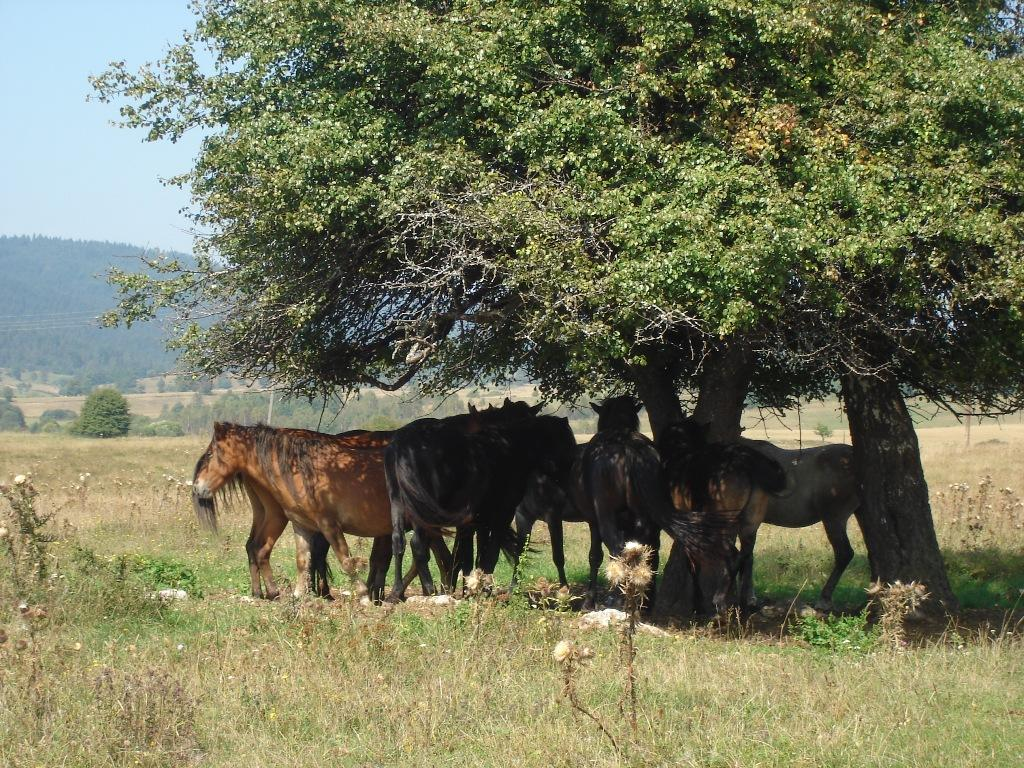
- Borike

- Location within Bosnia and Herzegovina
- Coordinates: 43°53′16″N 19°06′34″E
- Country: Bosnia and Herzegovina
- Entity: Republika Srpska
- Municipality: Rogatica
- Time zone: UTC+1 (CET)
  - Summer (DST): UTC+2 (CEST)

Borika (Serbian Cyrillic: Борика) is a village in the Republika Srpska, Bosnia and Herzegovina. According to the 1991 census, the village is located in the municipality of Rogatica.
