= Vlado Pravdić =

Bosnian musician (1949–2023)

Vladimir "Vlado" Pravdić (6 December 1949 – 5 December 2023) was a Bosnian musician who was the organist of the Yugoslav rock group Bijelo Dugme from 1974 to 1976 and again from 1978 to 1987.

== Biography ==
Born in Sarajevo, PR Bosnia and Herzegovina, FPR Yugoslavia as the only child of a Croat father and a Ukrainian mother. Pravdić's parents divorced during his adolescence as the youngster remained living with his mother. He enrolled in musical school at the age of seven and learned to play the piano. After completing his secondary schooling, he studied Physics at the University of Sarajevo's Faculty of Natural Sciences and Mathematics.

Pravdić's musical activity began during 1965 in Vokinsi, whom he was with until 1968. He would go on to play in Kost from 1968 to 1970, Ambasadori from 1970 to 1971 and Indexi from 1971 to 1973. While gigging with Indexi over summer 1973, he struck up a friendship with Goran Bregović who at the time had a band called Jutro. The two hit it off immediately, and Pravdić decided to join Jutro, which would soon be transformed into the highly influential Bijelo Dugme as of 1 January 1974.

Pravdić played on Bijelo Dugme's first two albums Kad bi' bio bijelo dugme and Šta bi dao da si na mom mjestu before commencing his compulsory military service in fall 1976, when he got replaced by Laza Ristovski. He returned to Bijelo Dugme in 1978 and went on to play until 1987.

During the early 1990s, Pravdić moved to Palm Desert in the United States where he lived awhile. Towards the end of his life, however, he lived in Split, Croatia.

Pravdić joined the rest of the band in the 2005 farewell tour.

Pravdić died in Split, on 5 December 2023, aged 73.
