= Zoran Redžić =

Bosnian musician (born 1948)

Zoran Redžić (born 29 January 1948) is a Bosnian musician, best known for playing the bass guitar in the popular Yugoslav rock band Bijelo Dugme.

Born in Sarajevo, Bosnia and Herzegovina, Yugoslavia, he is a younger brother of another Bosnian musician Fadil Redžić from band Indexi.

During the late 1960s, teenage Zoran first performed with the group Čičci together with Milić Vukašinović, Mahmut "Paša" Ferović, and Dragan Danilović.

Then in 1970 Redžić and drummer Milić Vukašinović joined Željko Bebek's band Kodeksi, of which Goran Bregović was already a member. After Bebek departed his own band, Redžić opted to stay with Goran Bregović in his new band Jutro which would go on to become the highly successful Bijelo Dugme in 1974.

Redžić was Bijelo Dugme's bassist from 1974 to 1975 and then from 1977 to 1989 and played on the band's every studio album except Eto! Baš hoću!. He took part in Bijelo Dugme's 2005 farewell tour and lives and works in Sarajevo.
