= Milić Vukašinović =

Yugoslav rock musician

- Also known as: Mitch Valiant; Militch
- Born: 9 March 1950 (age 76); Belgrade, PR Serbia, FPR Yugoslavia
- Genres: Rock; hard rock; heavy metal; folk rock; pop rock; folk
- Occupations: Musician; singer; songwriter
- Instruments: Drums; guitar; vocals
- Years active: 1965–present
- Labels: Jugoton; Diskoton; Sarajevo Disk; PGP-RTB; ZKP RTLJ; Diskos; Vatreni Poljubac d.o.o.; Goraton; Renome; Music Star; Gold; City Records
- Formerly of: Kodeksi; Indexi; Bijelo Dugme

Milić "Mića" Vukašinović (Serbian Cyrillic: Милић-Мића Вукашиновић; born 9 March 1950) is a Serbian and Yugoslav musician and songwriter, best known as the vocalist, guitarist and songwriter of the hard rock and heavy metal band Vatreni Poljubac. Vukašinović has also recorded a number of solo albums, and was a one-time drummer for popular rock bands Indexi and Bijelo Dugme.

Vukašinović started his career in Sarajevo in the mid-1960s, playing in local bands. In 1970, he became the drummer for Indexi, and in 1976 joined Bijelo Dugme as a temporary replacement for their drummer Ipe Ivandić, recording the album Eto! Baš hoću! with the group. Upon leaving Bijelo Dugme in 1977, Vukašinović started Vatreni Poljubac, achieving nationwide popularity with the group and earning the nickname "Doktor za rokenrol" ("Doctor of Rock 'n' Roll", after the title of the band's first hit). He disbanded the group in 1985, after recording seven studio albums with the group. Following the disbandment of Vatreni Poljubac, he has released several solo albums. In 1997, he moved to Belgrade, where he reformed Vatreni Poljubac, continuing to simultaneously record and release new albums with different lineups of the group and his solo albums.

In addition to releasing eleven studio albums with Vatreni Poljubac and nine solo studio albums, Vukašinović has worked as a songwriter, instrumentalist and a producer with a number of popular Yugoslav folk singers like Hanka Paldum, Toma Zdravković, Svetlana "Ceca" Ražnatović and Selma Bajrami.

== Early life ==
Born in Belgrade to an Andrijevica-born Yugoslav People's Army officer father, infant Vukašinović was brought to Peć in 1953 when his father got reassigned to a military unit there. After spending five years in Peć, the family moved to Sarajevo.

== Career ==
=== Early musical career (1962–1969) ===
Persuaded by his guitarist older brother, Vukašinović started drumming at the age of twelve. The pre-teen began in his brother's band, playing local dances before joining Plavi Dijamanti (The Blue Diamonds) at age thirteen. Formed by guitarist Edo Bogeljić, Plavi Dijamanti were an instrumental rock cover group—somewhat of an outdated setup since the city and the rest of Yugoslavia had already been experiencing the surging popularity of vocalist bands. Mostly playing local high school dances, their shining moment came in 1964 at the city's very first battle of the bands festival Gitarijada (Guitar Fest), held at the Second Sarajevo Gymnasium—a competition they won largely thanks to Vukašinović's memorable drum solo cover of The Shadows' "See You in My Drums".

After being expelled from a gymnasium for hitting the school principal, Vukašinović enrolled in a vocational technical school, studying to be a TV repairman. However, he eventually dropped out of high school and started living off music. In 1965, he started playing with Čičak (Burdock), a band featuring Zoran Redžić on bass, Mahmut "Paša" Ferović on rhythm guitar, and Dragan Danilović on lead guitar. The group split up in 1969.

=== Kodeksi, Mića, Goran i Zoran (1970–1971) ===
During the spring of 1970, urgently needing a new bass player in order to continue their Southern Italy club and bar gigs, cover band Kodeksi vocalist Željko Bebek invited Zoran Redžić to join. Since the struggling band (featuring twenty-year-old guitarist Goran Bregović as well) also needed a replacement drummer, Redžić in turn brought along his friend and old Čičak bandmate—twenty-year-old Vukašinović.

Arriving to a cover band primarily catering to tourists in the Naples area with a mixed commercial repertoire of Eastern and Southeastern European upbeat folk sounds (čoček, kozachok, kolo, etc.) and Top 40 Western English language hits, Vukašinović began to encourage and eventually managed to convince his new bandmates to switch their act to hard rock along the lines of the pioneering heavy metal music coming out of England epitomized by acts like Led Zeppelin and Black Sabbath. In terms of their finances, the cover band's new musical shift backfired immediately as it resulted in Kodeksi being fired from most of the bars and nightclubs in and around Naples they had regularly been playing prior. Continuing to move away from commercial songs, the band expanded their repertoire with the Canned Heat-inspired boogie rock sound favoured by Vukašinović and Bregović, all of which—due to the songs lacking vocals—led to their vocalist Bebek feeling disregarded and soon deciding to leave. The band then reconstituted as a trio, Mića, Goran i Zoran, with only Vukašinović, Bregović and Redžić remaining. Following a few more Italian bar gigs, the musicians returned to Sarajevo by early 1971.

Back in Sarajevo, the cover band played at the Želimir Altarac "Čičak"-run Kaktus night club within Youth Hall. Also, the band made their television debut by appearing on a TV Sarajevo variety show, a performance for which they had to compose an original number on short notice due to the station's policy of only allowing original music. Covering music by other bands generally began making 21-year-old Vukašinović feel creatively stunted and he soon made a decision to leave Yugoslavia and attempt to start a career in England.

=== Move to London (1971–1974) ===
In late summer of 1971, twenty-one-year-old Vukašinović relocated to London where he would end up spending the following three years. Finding any modicum of musical success in England proved elusive as he was quickly reduced to earning a living through menial jobs such as washing dishes in restaurants, unloading lorries, and bussing tables at the recently opened Hard Rock Cafe near Hyde Park Corner. Not long after arriving in London, during late fall of 1971, Vukašinović received a telegram offer of taking over the drummer spot in Indexi, an already established band throughout Yugoslavia. However, he decided to decline it, reasoning he wanted to continue trying to make it in London. By 1973, his girlfriend Vera joined him in London. The pair returned abruptly to Yugoslavia in late 1974 due to the news of the death of Vera's father.

=== Return to Sarajevo, joining Indexi (1974–1976) ===
Immediately after returning home in late 1974, Vukašinović joined Indexi, recording several singles with them. He notably played drums on the "Bacila je sve niz rijeku" ("She Let Everything Down the River") single that was initially met with lukewarm reception, but would eventually become an evergreen hit.

During late February 1975, Vukašinović played with the band at their triumphant Skenderija Hall concert in front of 14,000 people. The accomplishment led to a Yugoslavia-wide tour sponsored by the state-owned Zagreb-based Generalturist travel agency. The tour ended up not as successful as the Sarajevo concert since the band struggled to replicate the crowd draw outside of their hometown. Vukašinović parted ways with Indexi in early fall 1976, dissatisfied over revenue sharing within the band—specifically his own cut of the financial compensation for the upcoming tour of the Soviet Union.

=== Bijelo Dugme (1976–1977, 2005) ===
In October 1976, Goran Bregović offered Vukašinović the drummer spot in Bijelo Dugme on a contract basis due to their regular drummer Ipe Ivandić being suddenly called up for his mandatory military service. Vukašinović immediately accepted, reportedly receiving YUD20 million to play on the upcoming studio record and the subsequent tour. He thus appeared on their 1976 album Eto! Baš hoću! (There! I Will!), but left in 1977 right after the album tour that, in addition to Yugoslavia, also included Poland.

In 2005, Vukašinović took part in Bijelo Dugme reunion, playing drums on all three reunion concerts, in Sarajevo, Zagreb and Belgrade.

=== Vatreni Poljubac (1977–1986, 1998–present) ===
In October 1977, Vukašinović formed the hard rock power trio Vatreni Poljubac. The group gained the attention of the public with their debut single, "Doktor za rock and roll" ("Doctor for Rock and Roll"). The band's debut album Oh, što te volim, joj! (Oh, How I Love You, Ouch!) was released in 1978, presenting the band with folk-influenced hard rock and heavy metal sound, to good reception by the audience and lukewarm reactions of Yugoslav music critics. The following releases by the band featured similar sound, with Vukašinović's trademark machist and erotic lyrics. After the release of the band's fifth studio album Živio rock 'n' roll (Long Live Rock 'n' Roll) in 1982, Vukašinović sent the band on hiatus. He reformed the group for the 1985 comeback album Iz inata (Out of Spite). The group's 1986 album 100% Rock 'n' Roll was recorded with former Bijelo Dugme vocalist Mladen Vojičić "Tifa", and was the only Vatreni Poljubac album not to feature Vukašinović on vocals. After the album release, the group disbanded, Vukašinović devoting himself to working with Yugoslav folk singers and releasing several solo albums.

In 1997, Vukašinović moved from Sarajevo to Belgrade, where he reformed Vatreni Poljubac in 1998. During the following two decades, Vukašinović would simultaneously release new Vatreni Poljubac albums, recorded by various lineups of the band, and his solo albums.

=== Solo albums (1984–present) ===
Vukašinović released his first solo album, the pop rock–oriented Potraži me (Search for Me) in 1984, during Vatreni Poljubac hiatus. On the album recording he sang and played guitar, bass guitar and drums, while the keyboards were played by his former Bijelo Dugme bandmate Laza Ristovski. Following the disbandment of Vatreni Poljubac in 1986, Vukašinović recorded his second solo album, Hej jaro, jarane (Hey Buddy, Friend), featuring his folk songs. In 1992, he recorded the album Kao nekad (Like Before), cooperating on the recording with former Zabranjeno Pušenje member Mustafa Čengić. The vinyls and the album cover were printed, but never saw official promotion due to the outbreak of the Bosnian War. The only song from the album which found its way to the media was "Sad ga lomi" ("Now Ride On It").

In the spring of 2000, Vukašinović released his solo album Sad ga lomi, featuring the material originally recorded for his never-officially released 1992 album Kao nekad. In 2001, Vukašinović released the solo album Seksualno nemoralan tip (Sexually Immoral Guy), recorded with Laza Ristovski, and in 2003 he released another folk rock solo album, Ima boga (There Is God). Following the 2005 Bijelo Dugme reunion, he recorded covers of 50 Bijelo Dugme songs, releasing them on the double solo album Disko mix 50 hitova Gorana Bregovića (Disko Mix of 50 Hits by Goran Bregović) in 2006. He announced the breakthrough into the foreign market, releasing the single "Stop Globalization" under the name Mitch Valiant in 2007. In 2008, Vukašinović recorded his songs with folk singer Era Ojdanić for the album Da je život pametniji (If the Life Was Smarter). In 2014, he released his latest solo album, entitled Nemoj pjevat'... Ma nemoj (Don't Sing... You Don't Say), for which he recorded vocals, guitar, bass guitar and drums, with Laza Ristovski and bass guitarist Branko Isaković also partaking in the recording.

=== Work with folk singers (1982–present) ===
Vukašinović wrote all the songs for three albums by folk singer Hanka Paldum – Sanjam (I'm Dreaming, 1983), Dobro došli prijatelji (Welcome Friends, 1983) and Bolno srce (Aching Heart, 1986). In 1990, Vukašinović wrote and composed the song "Sećaš li se, Sanja" ("Do You Remember, Sanja") for Toma Zdravković's album Kafana je moja istina (Kafana is My Truth); the song would go on to become an evergreen hit.

In the mid 1990s, emerging folk music star Svetlana "Ceca" Veličković released covers of two of Vukašinović's song that he had composed for Hanka Paldum, "Volela sam volela" ("I Loved, I Loved") and "Tražio si sve" ("You Asked for Everything"). During fall of 1997, Vukašinović began a collaboration with Ceca, Serbia's biggest turbo folk star at the time. Her husband Željko Ražnatović "Arkan" brought Vukašinović from Sarajevo to Belgrade with a view of having him write and produce Ceca's upcoming studio album. Provided with paid accommodation at Hotel Jugoslavija, Vukašinović ended up staying in Belgrade for almost six months, and eventually remained living there permanently thus returning to the city of his birth. Right away upon arriving to Belgrade, his colourful public persona got him a lot of media attention, including memorable guest appearances on Milovan Ilić "Minimaks" talk show, Minimaksovizija. The collaboration with Ceca did not result in Vukašinović doing the entire album, as she eventually decided to go with her previous songwriters, Marina Tucaković and Ljiljana Jorgovanović for song lyrics while Aleksandar "Mili" Milić produced it. In the end, Vukašinović's only contribution to the album became music and arrangements for two lesser-known tracks, "Sviće dan" ("Day Is Coming") and "Ako te ona odbije" ("If She Refuses You"). Both songs were originally written by Vukašinović for Bosnian folk singer Selma Bajrami and released on her debut album Kad suza ne bude... (When There's No More Tears...); Vukašinović would also collaborate with Bajrami on her following two studio albums. In 2000, shortly after Arkan's death, Vukašinović reached out to Ceca again, offering her the song "Sanjam da si opet tu" ("I Am Dreaming that You Are Again"). Ceca refused the song, which then ended up being recorded by Jovana Tipšin.

=== Other projects ===
Vukašinović played as a percussionist with the Bosnian Latin music band Sonidos Barbados, releasing the albums Zaštićena zona (Protected Zone, 1995) and Senora (1996) with the group.

In 1997, Vukašinović authored the song "Goodbye" performed by Alma Čardžić as Bosnian entry on the 1997 Eurovision Song Contest. In 2001, with singer Selma Muhedinović, he recorded the song "Tebi suđena" ("Destined to You"), as their entry on the national selection for Bosnia's representative at the Eurovision Song Contest, but failed to qualify for the competition.

=== Other activities ===
Vukašinović published his autobiography, entitled Seksualno nemoralan tip (Sexually Imorral Guy), in 2012.

He played minor roles in TV series Mandsarda (Mansard Roof) and Folk.

On 1 March 2008 he entered the Veliki brat house as part of the show's second season in celebrity format. He appeared in the same show one year later, and entered again in 2013.

== Personal life ==
Vukašinović identifies as Yugoslav.

On 24 July 2018, Vukašinović's daughter Maja Avdibegović committed suicide by overdosing on illegal drugs. She was 35.

== Legacy ==
"Doktor za rock and roll" was covered by Serbian punk rock band Direktori on their 1995 album Lesli se vraća kući (Leslie Come Home); five years later, Vukašinović appeared on Direktori album Evo vam ga (Here You Go) as a guest in the song "Smor grad" ("Boring City"). "Doktor za rock and roll" was polled in 2001 as No. 95 on the Rock Express Top 100 Yugoslav Rock Songs of All Times.

== Discography ==
=== with Indexi ===
==== Singles ====
- "Samo su ruže znale" / "Samoćo, ljubavi moja" (1974)
- "Ding-da-da" / "Da l' smo ljudi" (1974)
- "Pogrešan broj" / "Bacila je sve niz rijeku" (1974)
- "Volim te" / "Ti si mi bila naj, naj!" (1975)
- "Obala pusta, obala vrela" / "Prva ljubav" (1975)

=== With Bijelo Dugme ===
==== Studio albums ====
- Eto! Baš hoću! (1976)

==== Live albums ====
- Turneja 2005: Sarajevo, Zagreb, Beograd (2005)

==== Singles ====
- "Himna lista Zdravo" (1976)
- ""Eto! Baš hoću!" / "Došao sam da ti kažem da odlazim" (1976)

=== With Vatreni Poljubac ===
==== Studio albums ====
- Oh, što te volim, joj! (1978)
- Recept za rock 'n' roll (1979)
- To je ono pravo (1980)
- Bez dlake na jeziku (1980)
- Živio rock 'n' roll (1982)
- Iz inata (1985)
- 100% Rock 'n' Roll (1986)
- Sve će jednom proć' samo neće nikad Rock 'n' Roll (1999)
- Gleda a ne da (2005)
- Kad svira rock 'n' roll (2011)
- Život je k'o fol ako nije R'n'R (2022)

==== Compilation albums ====
- Veliki hitovi (1983)
- Dr. za rock 'n roll (1997)
- 100% rock 'n roll (1997)
- Najveći hitovi (2000)

==== Singles ====
- "Doktor za rock and roll" / "Tvoje usne su bile moj najdraži dar" (1978)
- "Na vrat na nos i na svoju ruku" / "Od želje da te ljubim hoću prosto da poludim" (1979)

=== Solo ===
==== Studio albums ====
- Potraži me (1984)
- Hej jaro, jarane (1986)
- Kao nekad (1992)
- Sad ga lomi (2000)
- Seksualno nemoralan tip (2001)
- Ima Boga (2003)
- Disco Mix 50 hitova Gorana Bregovića (2006)
- Da je život pametniji
- Nemoj pjevat'... Ma nemoj (2014)

== Bibliography ==
- Seksualno nemoralan tip (2012)
