= Akšamija =

Akšamija is a surname appearing primarily in Bosnia and Hercegovina. It derives from Al-Sham, the traditional Arabic toponym associated with the Levant region, particularly Syria. It is often mistaken for being derived from Turkish akşam meaning "evening". Notable people with the surname include:

- Šefko Akšamija, Bosnian musician and founding member of Indexi
