= Mladen Vojičić Tifa =

Bosnian rock vocalist (born 1960)

Tifa
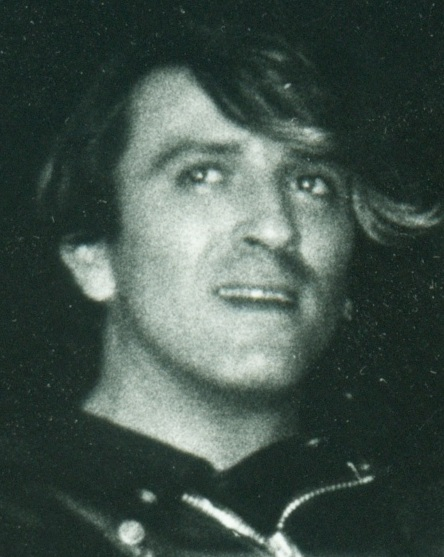
- Tifa in 1989
- Born: Mladen Vojičić; 17 October 1960 (age 65); Sarajevo, PR Bosnia and Herzegovina, FPR Yugoslavia
- Other name: Tifa
- Education: University of Sarajevo (attended)
- Spouse: Ljiljana Matić
- Children: 1
- Musical career
- Genres: Heavy metal, hard rock, folk rock
- Occupation: Singer
- Instruments: Vocals; guitar (bass guitar)
- Years active: 1980–present
- Website: www.tifa.ba (archived)

Mladen Vojičić (Cyrillic: Младен Војичић; born 17 October 1960), better known by his nickname Tifa (Cyrillic: Тифа), is a rock vocalist. He gained acclaim throughout former Yugoslavia for his brief stint as the lead singer of Bijelo Dugme in the mid-1980s.

Apart from Bijelo dugme, Tifa sang in numerous bands with varying degrees of prominence (most notable being Teška Industrija, Vatreni Poljubac and Divlje Jagode). Undisputedly a singer with strong vocal capabilities and a distinct vocal range, his impulsive personality and irrational character have often garnered controversy region-wide.

Nowadays, Tifa maintains a relatively successful solo career. He lives in his hometown of Sarajevo.

== Early life ==
Vojičić was born in Sarajevo, to a Serb father Branko and a Croat mother Jelena, at a time when Sarajevo was part of PR Bosnia and Herzegovina, Federal People's Republic of Yugoslavia. He was nicknamed Tifa before reaching the age of 4 because he loved trains and would often shout "Ide lokomotifa" (properly pronounced "Ide lokomotiva" meaning "Here comes the locomotive") because he had problems pronouncing the phoneme "v".

He displayed an early propensity for singing. By the age of 5, he knew the entire repertoire of Indexi. In primary school Tifa was an excellent student. Around that time he was a fan of UK band Sweet. He completed gymnasium, but did not excel at university. To please his intellectual father, he tried to work towards a "real job" by attending a number of University of Sarajevo faculties (mechanical engineering, architecture, civil engineering, geodesy), but ultimately abandoned each of them before devoting to music full-time.

== Musical career ==
=== Early years ===
Tifa started out as a bass guitar player in the first group he was involved with (Prvi čin). After barely a month he moved on to Kako kad and only started singing when the lead singer didn't show up for rehearsal one day. After some time the band dissolved as everybody except Tifa lost their interest in music. Tifa's last band before conscript military service in October 1980 was called Paradox.

While in the army he stayed in touch with Zlatan Čehić, Paradox's bass player. Together, they also started working on tracks by mailing packages back and forth containing audio cassettes with Zlatan composing and Tifa writing the lyrics. Upon his return from the army, Tifa learned that Paradox had been dissolved and that Zlatan joined another band named Top, so he took back all of his lyrics and sought a new band to play with, only to eventually end up in Top also. They lasted until January 1983.

In the meantime, word spread around Sarajevo about Tifa's excellent vocal skills, so people started coming to him with offers of joining their groups. This led to engagements in a few bands, none of which existed long enough to achieve any prominence. Briefly, he was even a fringe member of the freshly re-activated Teška industrija that made use of his lyrics in 1984 to record a few tracks on their comeback album Ponovo s vama ("With you again").

=== Bijelo dugme ===
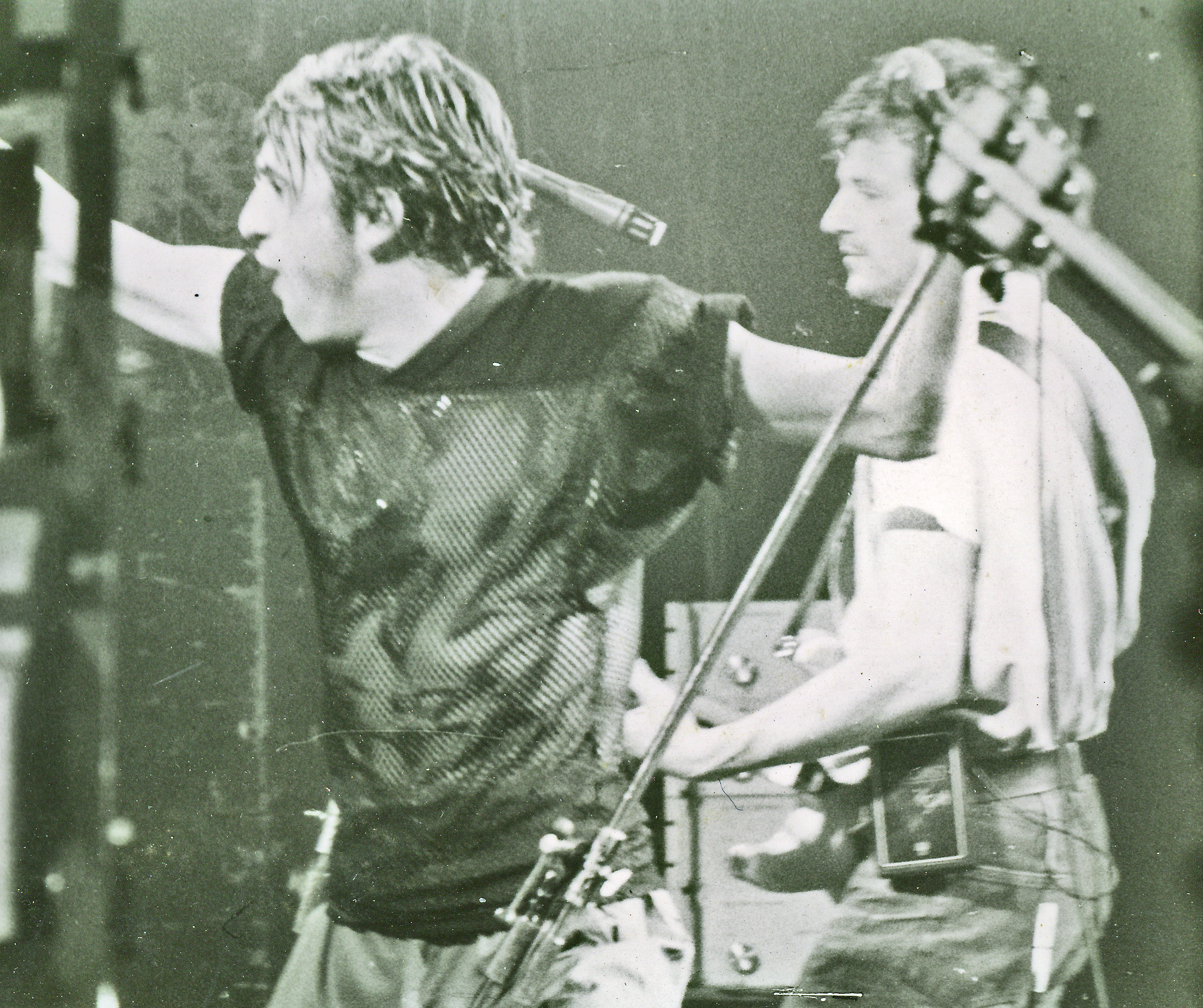
Tifa (left) with Goran Bregović at a Bijelo Dugme concert in Niš, 1985

Just as he was trying to get in touch with Milić Vukašinović for a possible stint with his band, Tifa got a dream offer very few struggling musicians would dare refuse. In early 1984, Goran Bregović invited him to join Bijelo Dugme, the biggest band in SFR Yugoslavia at the time, as replacement to recently departed Željko Bebek.

Being only 24 years old, Tifa was ill-prepared for the instant fame he was about to step into. To make matters even more difficult, his alcoholism and drug problem continued to deteriorate his character and motivation. During most of the recording sessions, Tifa was under the influence of drugs or alcohol, but despite numerous personality issues, Bregović was very much satisfied with the quality of his young singer's voice. After finishing the Bijelo Dugme album, the band embarked on what would prove to be an extremely troublesome tour. The burden of replacing Željko Bebek as the lead vocal who spent previous 14 years with the band's various incarnations was just too heavy for Tifa to cope with. Bregović & co., all of whom were considerably older and more mature than their new vocalist, demanded discipline and professional approach, but got neither. To ease the pressure of playing in front of tens of thousands screaming fans every other night Tifa disappeared even further in his chemical addictions, making himself pretty much impossible to deal with. By October 1985, Bregović had finally had enough and kicked him out of the band. Tifa's last performance with Bijelo dugme took place in Moscow on 2 August 1985.

=== Post-Dugme ===
That same year, Tifa managed to escape criminal prosecution despite being at the wrong end of a drug bust that saw a handful of dealers get arrested. Many have since wondered about the circumstances of the takedown, especially in light of the fact that Bijelo dugme drummer Ipe Ivandić ended up serving 2 years in jail for similar drug possession offence some four years earlier. The widely circulated unofficial story claims Tifa took a snitch deal from the police whereby providing the information they wanted about his suppliers in return for having the charges wiped off.

Back on the music front, his first post-Dugme move was a duet with Željko Bebek for Bebek's new project Armija B – they sang on a track called "Široko nam toplo polje glamočko". Two former Bijelo dugme frontmen even went on tour together, however proving once again he doesn't function well on the road, Tifa quit right in the middle of it, reasoning that it wasn't very successful anyway.

In the autumn 1986, he finally joined Milić Vukašinović's Vatreni poljubac recording 100% Rock'n'roll album with them.

After failing to settle down there too, Tifa ended up in Divlje Jagode, fulfilling Sead Lipovača's wish of replacing Alen Islamović with someone from "Bregović's clan" as revenge for Alen's transfer to Bijelo dugme. Tifa participated in the recordings of their album titled Konji and even contributed a track of his own – "Zauvijek tvoj".

After making one album with Divlje Jagode, he left the group in 1988 and recorded new material under Tifa & Vlado moniker with keyboards player Vlado Podany (who earlier also played in Divlje Jagode and Armija B). However, no record company showed sufficient interest in releasing the album.

=== Solo ===
In 1989, he successfully released his first solo album No1 which he recorded with Tifa Band, a freshly assembled group consisting mostly of musicians from bands he previously played with: Aleksandar Šimpraga (ex Top), Vlado Podany (ex Divlje Jagode), Mustafa Čizmić (ex Bolero), and Veso Grumić (ex Top) with the help of Djordje Ilijin (ex Tako) who played keyboards during studio sessions. Tifa wrote most of the songs for the band.

In early 1990, Tifa performed concerts with new lineup of Tifa Band with Zlatan Čehić (his old collaborator from Paradox days) as one of the members. Tifa then put together a second solo album Samo ljubav postoji together with Zlatan. The executive producer of the album was Želimir Altarac Čičak.

He remained in his hometown during most of the siege of Sarajevo and even managed to record an album Šareni dan during that time. After getting viciously beaten up by some local heavies, an incident which he vehemently refuses to disclose any details about to this day, Tifa left Sarajevo in 1995 for Germany. Once there, he first caught up with Divlje Jagode again and then formed his own band. Shortly thereafter he returned to Sarajevo and carried on with his solo career.

==== FK Željezničar Sarajevo anthem ====
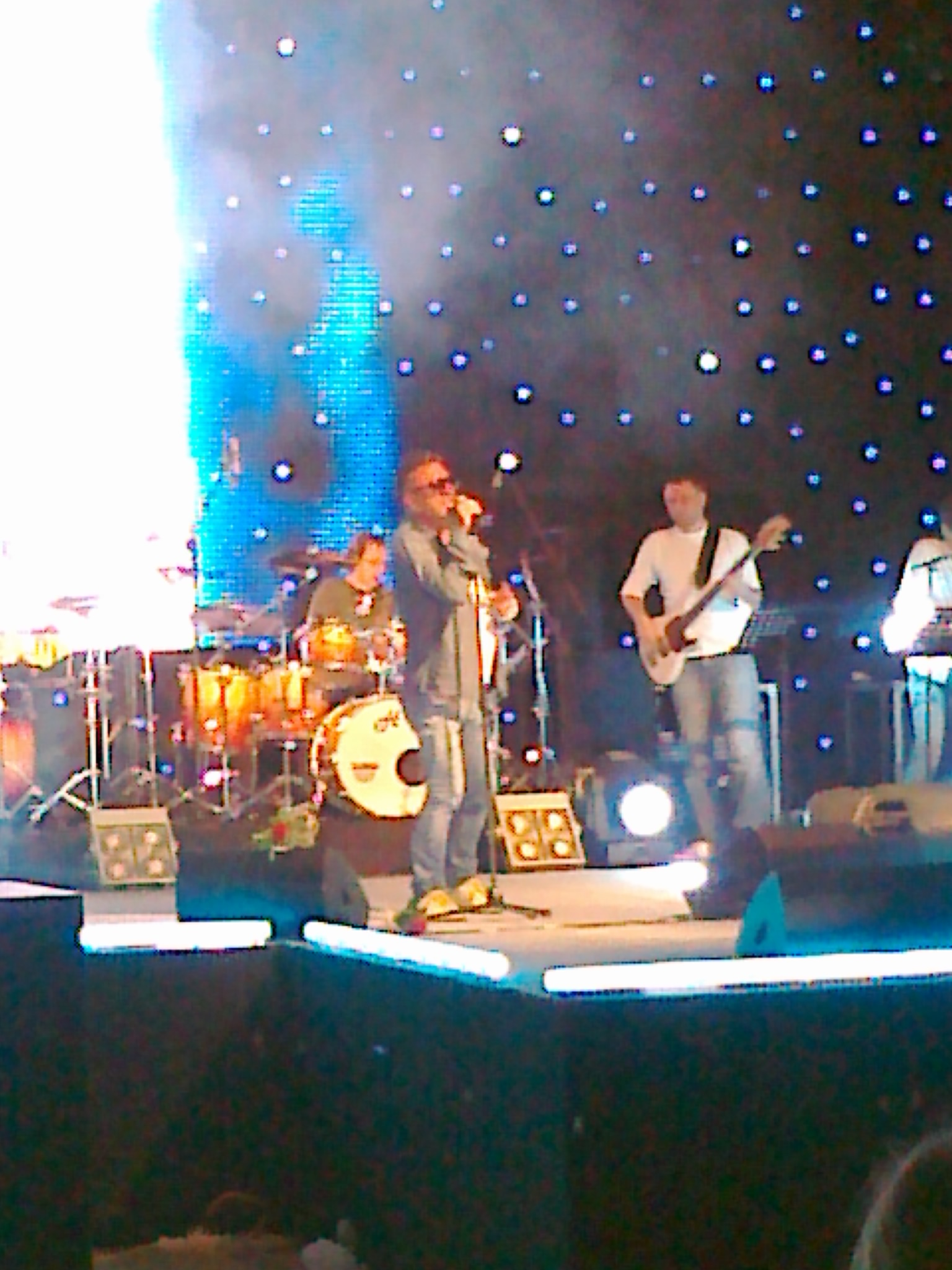
Tifa performing in Sarajevo, July 2011

In 1997, Tifa recorded the album Grbavica and his title song Grbavica became an anthem of local football club FK Željezničar Sarajevo support group The Maniacs, who sing lyrics of this song in every team's home match.

=== 2005 Bijelo dugme reunion ===
In June 2005, Tifa took part in Bijelo Dugme reunion for 3 large farewell concerts, but even then the reports of trouble were not far behind. Apparently he and Bebek got into an argument backstage at the Sarajevo concert (the first in the series). Then, the day before the Belgrade concert (the final one in the series), irritated Tifa blasted Bregović and manager Raka Marić in Kurir daily tabloid: "I hear some are already talking about continuing on with the Dugme thing. No problem, but not with me. After this concert, I don't wanna see them again in this or in the next life. Maybe only in the third one. They took a year and a half out of my life, my kid has forgotten what I look like."

He would reunite with the previous vocalists of Bijelo Dugme, Željko Bebek and Alen Islamović to form a group called "Kad Bi Bio Bijelo Dugme" in 2006 and go on a North American tour. They returned once again in 2007 and began their worldwide tour which lasted until the end of 2010.

=== Solo return (2013) ===
In 2013, Tifa released his seventh solo album by the name Spreman sam na sve.

== Filmography ==
=== Television ===
Year	Title	Role	Notes
1989	Top lista nadrealista	Waiter	He played the role of a waiter in one segment of the Top lista nadrealista second television series in 1989
2007–2011	Lud, zbunjen, normalan	Himself	He played himself in two episodes of the series. First in season 1 in episode 5 (2007) and the second time in season 4 in episode 115 (2011)

== Discography ==
=== Solo albums ===
- No.1 (1989)
- Samo ljubav postoji (1990)
- Dani bez tebe (1995)
- Grbavica (1997)
- Ostaću s'tobom (2000)
- Live – Skenderija 05. 10. 2001 (2001)
- Spreman sam na sve (2013)

=== Bijelo Dugme ===
- Bijelo dugme (1984)

=== Vatreni Poljubac ===
- 100% Rock 'n' Roll (1986)

=== Divlje Jagode ===
- Konji (1988)

Awards and achievements
Preceded by (Federal Republic of Yugoslavia) Vlado Georgiev	Sunčane Skale winner with (Federal Republic of Yugoslavia) Makadam; 2000	Succeeded by (Croatia) Ivana Banfić
