= Kodeksi =

Kodeksi were a cover band from Sarajevo, SR Bosnia and Herzegovina, SFR Yugoslavia that existed from 1965 until 1971. It is most notable as one of the predecessors to Bijelo dugme, the most commercially successful band ever to come out of SFR Yugoslavia. Key future members of Bijelo dugme — Goran Bregović, Željko Bebek, Zoran Redžić, and Milić Vukašinović — came up through Kodeksi.

The band effectively ended during fall 1970 via splitting off into two groups—Mića, Goran i Zoran and Novi Kodeksi—with both offshoots also subsequently folding within a year.

== Activity ==
=== 1960s ===
Kodeksi were formed in 1965 as a hobby cover band by Eduard "Edo" Bogeljić. Soon after formation, Bogeljić invited Željko Bebek to join as a singer and rhythm guitarist. By 1968, the group also featured Ismeta Dervoz on backing vocals and Luciano Paganotto on drums. Simultaneously to their high school studies, Kodeksi members spent the rest of the decade playing local dance parties with a repertoire of covered tunes they would hear on Radio Luxembourg. In the process, they built up somewhat of a local youth following in Sarajevo.

As the band experienced continual problems filling the bass player spot throughout this period, Bebek recommended 18-year-old Goran Bregović after seeing him play with another local cover band Beštije in 1969. Realizing Kodeksi were more established around town than his Beštije, teenage Bregović immediately jumped at the opportunity.

The band's musical activity began to assume a more serious form immediately after Bregović's arrival.

In the summer of 1969, Kodeksi secured a season-long gig at Hotel Splendid's bar in Dubrovnik, however, just before they were set to depart for Adriatic coast, Ismeta Dervoz left the band, choosing to fully focus on her university studies. Their Dubrovnik repertoire was aimed at tourists and consisted mostly of pop covers, folk standards, and easy-listening tunes.

Though it clearly didn't inspire much in terms of creativity, the Dubrovnik stay still proved useful as they got spotted by an Italian nightclub owner, Renato Pacifico, who offered a two-month gig in his Naples club. Infused with new energy, the band went back home to hone a new progressive rock set inspired by the likes of Cream and Jimi Hendrix, while simultaneously obtaining the necessary paperwork in order to be able to travel and temporarily live and work in Italy.

=== 1970s ===
Kodeksi (Bogeljić on lead guitar, Bebek on vocals and rhythm guitar, Bregović on bass, and Paganotto on drums) left for Italy in early 1970. However, soon upon arrival, it became apparent that the Italian club owner was deeply disappointed with their musical shift. Instead of Anglo-American progressive rock, he wanted them to play kozachok and other similar Eastern European folkish stuff from their Dubrovnik repertoire and the band unwillingly acquiesced.

Just before the first two-month stint ended, Kodeksi's founder and main decision-maker Edo Bogeljić quit and went back to Sarajevo, which is when Bregović assumed the lead guitar role for the first time. Local Italian musician was brought in to play the bass, but after he quit too, Bebek called up old friend Zoran Redžić. Redžić, in turn, brought along Milić Vukašinović as a replacement on drums for Paganotto who also quit in the meantime.

At that time, Kodeksi were enjoying a fairly successful run on the club & bar circuit throughout southern Italy, playing a commercial repertoire and building up a fairly devoted following. Vukašinović's arrival was particularly significant in this regard as he brought new musical influences along the lines of what Led Zeppelin and Black Sabbath were doing at the time. Additionally, he convinced the rest of the band on incorporating the new sound into their set. Within two weeks of his arrival, Kodeksi were fired from all the places they were playing.

With no gigs and very little savings, the foursome of Bebek, Bregović, Redžić, and Vukašinović stayed on the island of Capri. Sticking with the new sound, they experienced difficulty getting gigs but eventually found a low-paying one on Ischia island. As the 1970 summer season drew to a close that gig ended as well and they relocated back to Naples where they struggled to make ends meet.

This is when the band began to disregard Bebek musically. In keeping with the Canned Heat-inspired boogie rock sound favoured by Vukašinović and Bregović, the two made Bebek stop playing the rhythm guitar reasoning it's no longer fashionable. Bebek also had trouble adapting to the new material vocally—he'd sing the intro on most songs and then step back as the other three members improvised for the remainder of songs. After being a key band member only months earlier, Bebek was seeing his role gradually reduced. It was more than he was willing to take and in the fall of 1970, he left Kodeksi to return to Sarajevo.

==== Mića, Goran i Zoran ====
For their part, Vukašinović, Bregović, and Redžić remained in Italy and continued soldiering on as a trio under the new name Mića, Goran i Zoran, playing everything from clubs to weddings in the Naples area. Eventually, they returned to Sarajevo in the spring of 1971 when Goran's mother and Zoran's brother Fadil Redžić came to Italy to bring them back.

Upon returning, the trio continued gigging in Sarajevo—mostly at the Želimir Altarac Čičak-run Kaktus Klub located in the basement of the recently opened Dom Mladih—playing covers of Ten Years After, Led Zeppelin, Black Sabbath, Deep Purple, etc. Despite getting satisfactory reaction from the young Sarajevo club crowds that seldom prior had a chance to hear hard rock cover bands, it was becoming clear that the popularity of live cover acts in the city is on the wane. The trio also made their television debut, performing on Nikola Borota's rock'n'roll music show on TV Sarajevo; Borota booked them on condition of composing their own song so Vukašinović and Bregović came up with an original number, which, by Vukašinović's own words, ended up being just a "mish-mash and slight re-work of different hard rock tracks by British and American bands we listened to at the time".

By late summer in 1971, Vukašinović decided to move to London and the band ceased to exist.

==== Novi Kodeksi ====
Shortly after coming back to Sarajevo from Italy, Bebek reunited with Bogeljić, another former Kodeksi member who had also previously left amid acrimony while the band gigged in Italy. Seeing that Vukašinović, Bregović, and Redžić were out of sight in Italy performing as "Mića, Goran i Zoran", Bogeljić and Bebek reclaimed the Kodeksi name, getting a new rhythm section—bass guitarist Dražen Tuce (formerly of Pro Arte) and drummer Ljubo Pavlović (formerly of Romeo i Julia)—and forming Novi Kodeksi in late 1970.

Conceptualized as a return to the original Kodeksi cover repertoire, Bogeljić's and Bebek's Novi Kodeksi gigged around Sarajevo, along with an odd gig out of town, with varying success as the audiences' general taste seemingly moved away from cover music. Their shining moment came during the New Year's 1971 rock marathon concert at Dom Mladih where they set a record for the non-stop length of performance, spending 32 straight hours playing on stage — breaking the feat set a year earlier at the same venue by the band Čičak that played for 26 hours non-stop. The following summer 1971, they lined up a summer-long gig in the coastal town of Vrsar, playing in hospitality venues catering to foreign tourists. After that gig ended, soon to be 26-year-old Bebek got married and all but decided to quit music as a professional endeavour. In late 1971 he received the call-up for his mandatory Yugoslav People's Army (JNA) service and Novi Kodeksi disbanded.
