= Vatreni Poljubac =

Bosnian heavy metal band

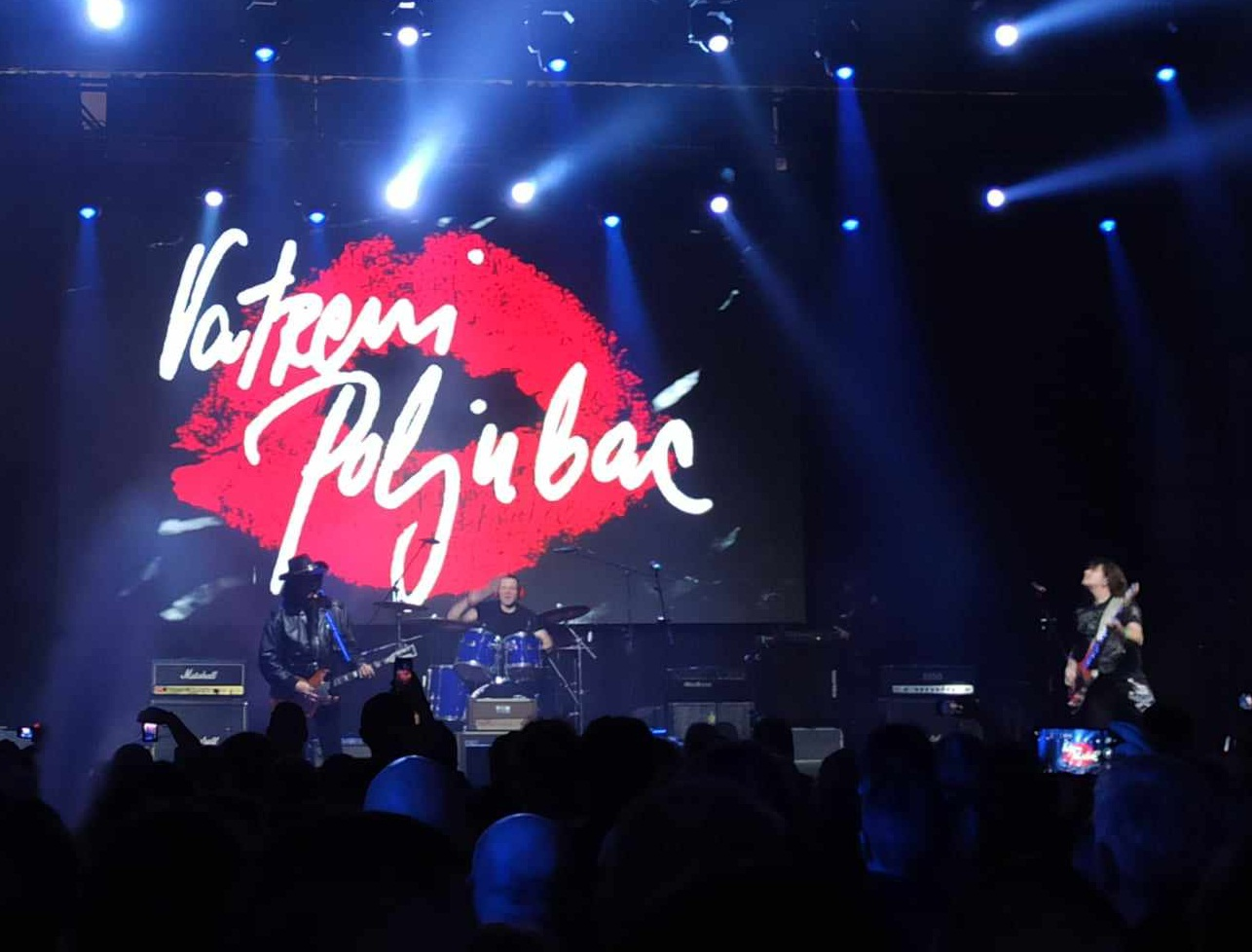
- Vatreni Poljubac performing in Belgrade in 2022

Background information
- Origin: Sarajevo, SR Bosnia and Herzegovina, SFR Yugoslavia (1977–1986); Belgrade, Serbia (1998–present)
- Genres: Hard rock; heavy metal; folk rock
- Years active: 1977–1986; 1998–present
- Labels: Jugoton, Diskoton, Sarajevo Disk, PGP-RTB, ZKP RTLJ, Nimfa Sound, Goraton, Music Star, Gold
- Members: Milić Vukašinović; Srđan Đukić; Vladimir Ćopić
- Past members: Shefqet Hoxha; Perica Stojanović; Sanin Karić; Nedžib Jelač; Velibor Rajčić; Mladen Vojičić; Marko Nikolić; Dušan Obradović; Miloš Nikolić; Dejan Nikolić; Dejan Škopelja; Predrag Gostović

Vatreni Poljubac (trans. Fiery Kiss) is a hard rock and heavy metal band, originally formed in 1977 in Sarajevo, SR Bosnia and Herzegovina, SFR Yugoslavia, and since 1998 based in Belgrade, Serbia. Formed and led by vocalist, guitarist and songwriter Milić Vukašinović, Vatreni Poljubac was one of the most notable acts of the Yugoslav hard rock and heavy metal scene.

Formed in October 1977, after the end of Vukašinović's one-year stint as the drummer for Bijelo Dugme, the original lineup of Vatreni Poljubac consisted of Vukašinović, bass guitarist Shefqet Hoxha and drummer Perica Stojanović. The band's initial releases, the single "Doktor za rock and roll" and the album Oh, što te volim, joj!, were well received by the audience and presented the band with their hard rock and heavy metal sound with folk influences. With their following releases the band maintained a loyal fanbase, although Vukašinović was occasionally criticized for his use of folk motifs in the band's songs by a part of Yugoslav music press, which compared some of Vatreni Poljubac songs with the Yugoslav "newly composed folk music". In 1982, the band went on a three-year hiatus, Vukašinović reforming the group for the 1985 comeback album Iz inata. The group's 1986 album 100% Rock 'n' Roll was recorded with former Bijelo Dugme vocalist Mladen Vojičić "Tifa", and is the only Vatreni Poljubac album not to feature Vukašinović on vocals. After the album release, the group disbanded, Vukašinović devoting himself to working with Yugoslav folk singers and releasing several solo albums. In 1997, he moved from Sarajevo to Belgrade, where he reformed Vatreni Poljubac in 1998. During the following two decades, Vukašinović would simultaneously release new Vatreni Poljubac albums, recorded by various lineups of the band, and his solo albums. Although Vukašinović's late works saw very little critical and commercial success, Vatreni Poljubac still enjoys a loyal fanbase in former Yugoslav republics.

== History ==
=== Milić Vukašinović's beginnings, work with Indexi and Bijelo Dugme (1962–1976) ===
Milić "Mića "Vukašinović was born in Belgrade, but moved with his family to Sarajevo at an early age, due to his father's employment in the Yugoslav People's Army. He started to play drums at the age of twelve, persuaded by his older brother, who played guitar. He debuted as a member of his brother's band, playing at dances, and at the age of thirteen joined the band Plavi Dijamanti (The Blue Diamonds). After being expelled from gymnasium for hitting the school principal, he enrolled in a technical school, studying to be a TV repairman. However, he eventually dropped out of high school and started living off music.

In 1965, he started playing with the band Čičak (Burdock), and in 1970 performed in Italian clubs with Goran Bregović, Željko Bebek and Zoran Redžić. Upon their return to Sarajevo, Vukašinović, Bregović and Redžić formed the progressive rock trio Mića, Goran i Zoran. At the end of summer of 1971, dissatisfied with the little success the group had, he left Sarajevo and moved to London, where he spent three years, working as a manual laborer and learning to play the guitar. At the end of 1974, he returned to Sarajevo, becoming the drummer of the well-established band Indexi. In October 1976, he was invited by his former bandmates Bregović and Redžić to join their new band, the highly popular Bijelo Dugme, as a temporary replacement for their drummer Ipe Ivandić, who was serving his mandatory stint in the Yugoslav army. Vukašinović left Bijelo Dugme in October 1977, after Ivandić returned from the army and rejoined the band.

=== Band formation, rise to prominence and hiatus (1977–1982) ===
Upon leaving Bijelo Dugme in October 1977, Vukašinović formed Vatreni Poljubac. The first lineup of the band consisted of Vukašinović (vocals, guitar), former Rezonansa and Divlje Jagode member Shefqet Hoxha (bass guitar), and former Ambasadori and Indexi member Perica Stojanović (drums). Vatreni Poljubac debuted on the 1977 BOOM Festival held in Novi Sad. Soon after, the band released their debut single "Doktor za rock and roll" ("PhD in Rock and Roll"), with "Tvoje su usne bile moj najdraži dar" ("Your Lips Were the Dearest Gift to Me") as the B-side. The single, produced by Nikola Borota, featured Vukašinović's autobiographical lyrics. Prior to the song recording, on the insistence of the band's record label, Jugoton, Vukašinović had to alter the song verse "Sve ostalo je sranje" ("Everything else is shit") to "Sve ostalo je manje" ("Everything else is less"). The single became and immediate hit, and was proclaimed, at the beginning of 1978, Hit of the Year 1977 in the Yugoslav teen magazine Zdravo.

In 1978, the band released their debut album, Oh, što te volim, joj! (Oh, How I Love You, Ouch!). The album was recorded in London and produced by Richard Whally. Vukašinović's guitar playing and high-pitched singing were influenced by contemporary heavy metal acts, with songs featuring his machist and erotic lyrics, with a corresponding album cover featuring erotic imagery. Alongside energetic hard rock and heavy metal tracks, the album featured the ballad "Baj, baj, malena" ("Bye, Bye, Little Girl"). Despite the band's and their manager's ambitions for large commercial success, the Yugoslav music press criticized Vukašinović's use of folk motifs in the group's songs, accusing him of trying to imitate Bijelo Dugme's trademark Balkan folk-influenced hard rock sound, describing the album as monotonous and expressing belief that it lacked authenticity of the band's debut single. In 1979, Vatreni Poljubac performed at the Opatija Festival, their songs "Ja bih se ljubio, ali nemam s kim" ("I Would Kiss Someone, But Have No One to Kiss") and "Ostani još samo jednu noć" ("Stay for Just One More Night") appearing on the festival's official compilation album Opatija '79 – Rock grupe (Opatija '79 – Rock Bands).

In 1979, the band's second studio album was released, the double album Recept za rock 'n' roll (Recipe for Rock 'n' Roll), with part of the songs written by Vukašinović in early and mid-1970s. The album was produced by band members themselves. Sixteen songs on the album featured similar folk-influenced hard rock and heavy metal sound as heard on the band's debut, most prominently in the instrumental track "Rock kolo", which led Yugoslav music magazine Džuboks to describe Vukašinović as a "heavy metal folk singer".

In 1980, Vatreni Poljubac released their third album, To je ono pravo (That's the Right Stuff). Stylistically similar to their previous two releases, with Vukašinović's self-confident lyrics—like in the track "Nek ne sluša kome smeta moj rock 'n'roll" ("Don't Listen if You Have a Problem with My Rock 'n' Roll")—the album also brought the track "Oda heroju" ("Ode to Hero"), inspired by the Yugoslav National Liberation War and described by rock critic Dragan Kremer in a review of the album as "national-liberation-revolutionary-heavy metal". Following the album release, the band once again appeared on the Opatija Festival, their song "Ona je tako dobra žena" ("She's Such a Good Woman") appearing on the festival's official compilation album. By the end of the year, the band had released another studio album, Bez dlake na jeziku (Without Mincing Words). The album brought the erotic-lyrics hit "Boogie je htjela" ("She Wanted Boogie"), but also the song "Moj dug je otišo van" ("My Friend Went Over the Border"), dealing with the emigration of educated young Yugoslavs who had no opportunity of obtaining an employment in their home country. Following the album release, Hoxha left the band, forming his own group, Carski Rez (Caesarean Section), with which he released the 1984 album Igrao sam na jednu kartu (I Placed All My Hopes on One Card). Later, he formed the band Detektor Laži (Lie Detector), and with the dissolution of Yugoslavia moved to Bulgaria. Hoxha was replaced by Sanin Karić, who was previously a member of Teška Industrija and played with Bijelo Dugme as a touring musician.

Following the release of Bez dlake na jeziku, Vukašinović recorded sixteen of his songs with English language lyrics, in his attempt to achieve breakthrough into the foreign market. As his efforts had little success, he focused back on his career in Yugoslavia, recording the album Živio rock 'n' roll (Long Live Rock 'n' Roll) with Vatreni Poljubac. The album brought the songs "Krv i znoj" ("Blood and Sweat"), "Svi za rock 'n' roll" ("All for Rock 'n' Roll") and "Stoput na dan" ("One Hundred Times a Day") in Vukašinović's well-known manner. In the song "Poštovani ska ska" ("Honorable Ska Ska") Vukašinović ridiculed Goran Bregović and other musicians of his generation who joined on the exuberant Yugoslav new wave scene. However, Vukašinović did express positive attitude towards young punk rockers in the punk-influenced track "Brat mi fura pank" ("My Brother's Into Punk"), and several other tracks were also influenced by punk rock. In addition, in the album's ballads "Kako da znam" ("How Can I Know") and "Hej, zaboravi" ("Hey, Forget") Vukašinović moved away from the band's trademark power trio sound by introducing piano, played by his former Bijelo Dugme bandmate Laza Ristovski.

After the release of Bez dlake na jeziku, Vukašinović decided to send the band on hiatus. During the break in the group's work, he wrote all the songs for three albums by folk singer Hanka Paldum, and recorded his first solo album, the pop rock-oriented Potraži me (Search for Me). On the album recording he sang and played guitar, bass guitar and drums, while the keyboards were played by Laza Ristovski. Sanin Karić worked as a studio musician and practiced to become a goldsmith, and Perica Stojanović, together with Bijelo Dugme manager Raka Marić, started the cafe Estrada (The Scene), which would become the gathering place for Sarajevo musicians.

=== Comeback and disbandment (1985–1986) ===
In 1985, Vatreni Poljubac made a comeback with the album Iz inata (Out of Spite). The album was recorded in a new lineup, featuring Vukašinović, Nedžib Jelač (bass guitar) and Velibor Rajčić (drums). The album brought the humorous-lyrics hit "Žikino kolo" ("Žika's Kolo"). On June 15 of the same year, Vatreni Poljubac, alongside 23 other acts, performed on the Red Star Stadium in Belgrade, on the concert which was a part of YU Rock Misija, a Yugoslav contribution to Live Aid. Dissatisfied with constant echo, Vukašinović stopped playing in the middle of the song "Živio Rock 'n' Roll", saying angrily into the microphone: "It's not good... Fuck it, it's not good!". The concert was directly broadcast on Yugoslav television, and Vukašinović's profane outburst was criticized by a sizeable section of the public.

In 1986, Karić and Rajčić returned to the group, and the band was joined by former Bijelo Dugme vocalist Mladen Vojičić "Tifa". The new lineup of the band recorded the album 100% Rock 'n' Roll, the only Vatreni Poljubac album not to feature Vukašinović on vocals. The keyboards on the album recording were played by Đorđe Ilijin, a former member of the progressive rock band Tako. 100% Rock 'n' Roll featured more Deep Purple- and Whitesnake-inspired sound that the band's early releases, although sex, alcohol and rock music were once again prevailing themes in Vukašinović's lyrics. Alongside the song "Kad sve prođe ostaću sam" ("When Everything Ends I'll Stay Alone"), originally written for Željko Bebek but rejected by him, the album featured the folk-oriented hit "Stipu gatibo" (šatrovački for "Pusti bogati", trans. "Let It Be for God's Sake") and the ballads "Kako da te ostavim" ("How Can I Leave You") and "Ne pitaj me" ("Don't Ask Me").

After the album release, Vukašinović decided to end the group's activity.

=== Vukašinović' activities after the group's disbadment (1987–1997) ===
In the years following Vatreni Poljubac disbandment, Vukašinović devoted himself to composing for Yugoslav folk singers. His condition for cooperation was that he would to be the sole songwriter, author of musical arrangements, performer of all instruments and the producer on the album. In 1988, he released his own album of folk songs, entitled Hej jaro, jarane (Hey, Buddy, Friend). In 1992, he recorded the album Kao nekad (Like Before), cooperating on the recording with former Zabranjeno Pušenje member Mustafa Čengić. The vinyls and the album cover were printed, but never saw official promotion due to the outbreak of the Bosnian War. The only song from the album which found its way to the media was "Sad ga lomi" ("Now Ride On It").

Vukašinović spent the entire Bosnian War in the besieged Sarajevo. He played as a percussionist with the Bosnian Latin music band Sonidos Barbados, releasing the albums Zaštićena zona (Protected Zone, 1995) and Senora (1996) with the group. In 1997, Nimfa Sound record label released two hastily prepared compilation albums, Dr. za rock 'n roll and 100% rock 'n roll, featuring Vatreni Poljubac songs, as well as songs from Vukašinović's solo albums. During the same year, Vukašinović authored the song "Goodbye" performed by Alma Čardžić as Bosnian entry on the 1997 Eurovision Song Contest.

=== Reformation (1998–present) ===
In November 1997, Vukašinović moved to Belgrade There, he reformed Vatreni Poljubac with young Belgrade musicians Marko Nikolić (bass guitar) and Dušan Obradović (drums). The reformed band debuted on the 1998 Concert of the Year festival in Novi Sad. In September 1999, the band released the album Sve će jednom proć' samo neće nikad Rock 'n' Roll (Everything Will Pass, Except Rock 'n' Roll), featuring seventeen mostly erotic-themed songs. In the spring of 2000, Vukašinović released his solo album Sad ga lomi, featuring the material originally recorded for his never-officially-released 1992 album Kao nekad. The release was followed by a series of Vatreni Poljubac performances, for which the band was joined by guitarist Miloš Nikolić.

In 2001, Vukašinović released the solo album Seksualno nemoralan tip (Sexually Immoral Guy), recorded with Laza Ristovski, and in 2003 he released another folk rock solo album, Ima boga (There Is God). With singer Selma Muhedinović, he recorded the song "Tebi suđena" ("Destined to You"), as their entry on the national selection for Bosnia's representative at the Eurovision Song Contest, but failed to qualify for the competition.

In 2005, Vukašinović and old Vatreni Poljubac members Sanin Karić and Perica Stojanović recorded new songs and re-recorded some of the band's old songs for Vatreni Poljubac's ninth studio album, Gleda a ne da (She's Looking at Me but Won't Give Me Some). During the same year, he took part in Bijelo Dugme reunion, playing drums on all three reunion concerts, in Sarajevo, Zagreb and Belgrade. Following the reunion, he recorded covers of 50 Bijelo Dugme songs, releasing them on the double solo album Disko Mix 50 hitova Gorana Bregovića (Disko Mix of 50 Hits by Goran Bregović). Once again he announced the breakthrough into the foreign market, releasing the single "Stop Globalization" under the name Mitch Valiant. In 2007, Vatreni Poljubac was scheduled to appear as the opening band on the Rolling Stones concert in Belgrade's Ušće park. However, dissatisfied with the fact that his band was scheduled to appear as the first opening act, before Električni Orgazam, Vukašinović cancelled the performance. In 2008, Vukašinović recorded his songs with folk singer Era Ojdanić for the album Da je život pametniji (If the Life Was Smarter).

With bass guitarist Srđan Đukić and drummer Vladimir Ćopić, Vukašinović recorded the tenth Vatreni Poljubac studio album, entitled Kad svira rock 'n' roll (When Rock 'n' Roll is Playing), released in 2011. It was followed by Vukašinović's 2014 solo album Nemoj pjevat'... Ma nemoj (Don't Sing... You Don't Say), on which he sang, played guitar, bass guitar and drums, with Laza Ristovski and bass guitarist Branko Isaković also partaking in the recording. In 2020, Bosnian director Miroslav Čigoja shot the film 70 godina doktora za rokenrol (70 Years of PhD in Rock 'n' Roll) about Vukašinović.

Vatreni Poljubac's latest studio album, Život je k'o fol ako nije R'n'R (Life Is Fake If It Ain't R'n'R) was released in 2022. Alongside the songs with Vukašinović's trademark erotic lyrics, the album also featured political-related songs.

== Legacy ==
"Doktor za rock and roll" was covered by Serbian punk rock band Direktori on their 1995 album Lesli se vraća kući (Leslie Come Home); five years later, Vukašinović appeared on Direktori album Evo vam ga (Here You Go) as a guest in the song "Smor grad" ("Boring City"). "Doktor za rock and roll" was polled in 2001 as No. 95 on the Rock Express Top 100 Yugoslav Rock Songs of All Times. The song lyrics are featured in Petar Janjatović's book Pesme bratstva, detinjstva & potomstva: Antologija ex YU rok poezije 1967 - 2007 (Songs of Brotherhood, Childhood & Offspring: Anthology of Ex YU Rock Poetry 1967 – 2007).

== Members ==
- Milić Vukašinović – vocals, guitar (1977–1986, 1998–present)
- Perica Stojanović – drums (1977–1982, 1986, 2005)
- Shefqet Hoxha – bass guitar (1977–1980)
- Sanin Karić – bass guitar (1980–1982, 1986, 2005,2006)
- Nedžib Jeleč – bass guitar (1985)
- Velibor Rajčić – drums (1985)
- Mladen Vojičić – vocals (1986)
- Marko Nikolić – bass guitar (1998–2001)
- Dušan Obradović – drums (1998–2001)
- Miloš Nikolić – guitar (2000–2001)
- Dejan Škopelja – bass guitar (2007)
- Predrag Gostović – bass guitar (2010-2011)
- Dejan Nikolić – drums (2006-2008, 2010-2011)
- Srđan Đukić – bass guitar (2011–present)
- Vladimir Ćopić – drums (2011–present)

== Discography ==
=== Studio albums ===
- Oh, što te volim, joj! (1978)
- Recept za rock 'n' roll (1979)
- To je ono pravo (1980)
- Bez dlake na jeziku (1980)
- Živio rock 'n' roll (1982)
- Iz inata (1985)
- 100% Rock 'n' Roll (1986)
- Sve će jednom proć' samo neće nikad Rock 'n' Roll (1999)
- Gleda a ne da (2005)
- Kad svira rock 'n' roll (2011)
- Život je k'o fol ako nije R'n'R (2022)

=== Compilation albums ===
- Veliki hitovi (1983)
- Dr. za rock 'n roll (1997)
- 100% rock 'n roll (1997)
- Najveći hitovi (2000)

=== Singles ===
- "Doktor za rock and roll" / "Tvoje usne su bile moj najdraži dar" (1978)
- "Na vrat na nos i na svoju ruku" / "Od želje da te ljubim hoću prosto da poludim" (1979)
