= Želimir Altarac Čičak =

Bosnian musician (1947–2021)

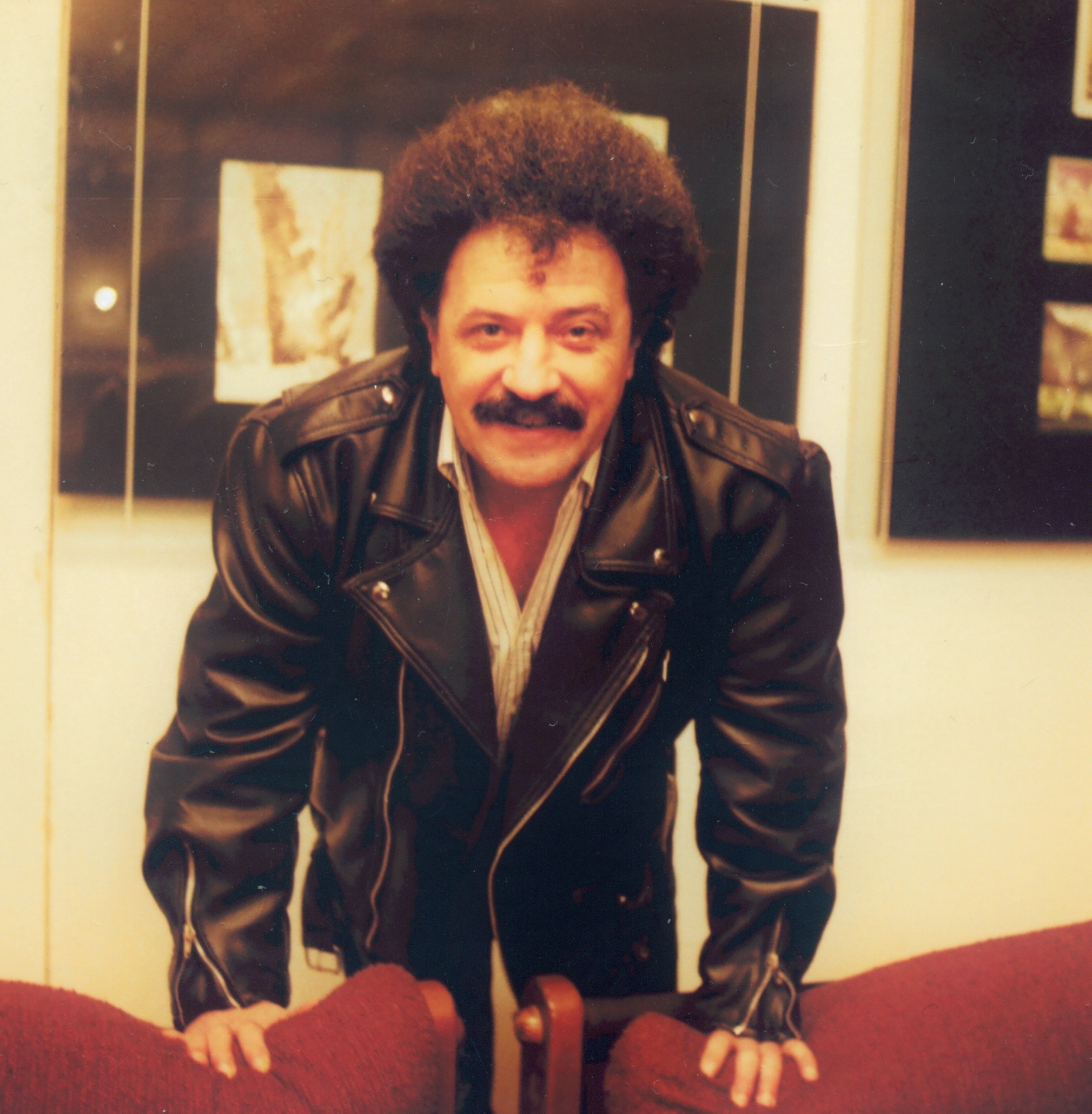
- Born: Želimir Altarac; 21 August 1947; Sarajevo, PR Bosnia and Herzegovina, Yugoslavia
- Died: 26 March 2021 (aged 73); Sarajevo, Bosnia and Herzegovina
- Occupations: Music promoter; poet; songwriter; radio/TV personality; publicist
- Years active: 1962–2021
- Known for: 'Uz malu pomoć mojih prijatelja' rock marathons, Indexi songwriter

Želimir "Čičak" Altarac (21 August 1947 – 26 March 2021) was a Bosnian singer-songwriter from Sarajevo.

== Early life ==
Widely known as Čičak (burdock) for his curly hair, Altarac attended the First Sarajevo Gymnasium from 1961 until 1965. During this period, he grew increasingly infatuated with Western rock music coming from the United States and the United Kingdom, which had gained a devoted audience among the youth of communist Yugoslavia. Teenage Čičak often skipped gym classes in pursuit of activities he was more interested in – organizing local rock gigs, writing and reciting poetry, moderating music events, and editing the gymnasium newsletter Polet. He developed a particular interest in the crossover between poetry and rock music, reciting his own poetry at different student manifestations over the coming years. Among such events from this period was a beatnik-like stage setup where upstart actors Etela Pardo and Branko Ličen recited Čičak's verses while musician Ranko Rihtman played the keyboard.

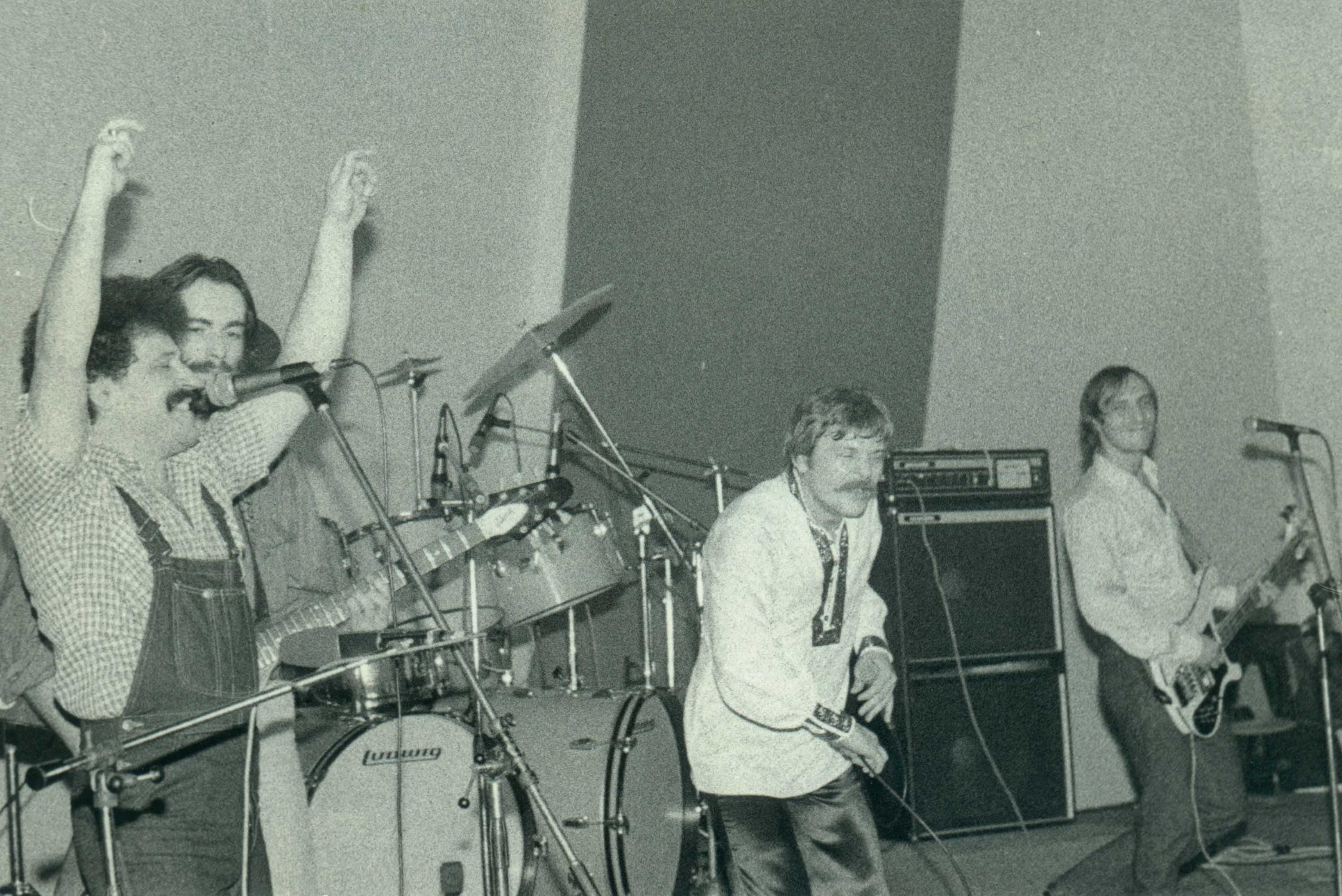
Čičak (far left) with Indexi at the very first 'Uz malu pomoć mojih prijatelja' rock marathon, held at Sarajevo's Dom mladih in January 1979

In the late sixties, the first underground club, Barutana, was taking shape in downtown Sarajevo, with Čičak participating from the beginning. Many later famous musicians of former Yugoslavia started their journey in Barutana in some sort of Bosnian/Yugoslavian "tower of songs". Čičak soon commenced a program "Čičak plus Čičak" ("Burdock Plus Burdock") where he and the band Čičak jointly performed. It was also in Barutana that Čičak made a step towards not only working with music but rather working on music of his own. His cooperation with the pop-rock group Kodeksi resulted in three chart successes according to the Sarajevo Radio Chart (the best media platform for progressive music waves at the time). He wrote lyrics for Eduard Bogeljić's song "Lutalica," and he also made a remake of two world hits: "To Love Somebody" by the Bee Gees and "Song of a Baker" by Small Faces.

== DJ, journalist, and promoter ==
Čičak's collaboration with the rock group Indexi helped him to further sharpen his poetic expression in pop-rock music. He wrote lyrics for their most famous songs, such as "Negdje na kraju u zatišju" ("Somewhere, at the end of a road, where everything goes down to silence"), and "Svijet u kome živim" (The World I live In). "Negdje na kraju u zatišju" was published in Polet, only to be later musically arranged and entuned by Slobodan Bodo Kovačević of Indexi, who made a 12-minute-long song which starts and ends with recitation. It was a somewhat unusual and new form of musical expression at the time, but was very successful according to the Radio Sarajevo Music Chart. Čičak also later wrote, "Povratak Jacka Trbosjeka" (Return of Jack the Ripper) for Indexi.

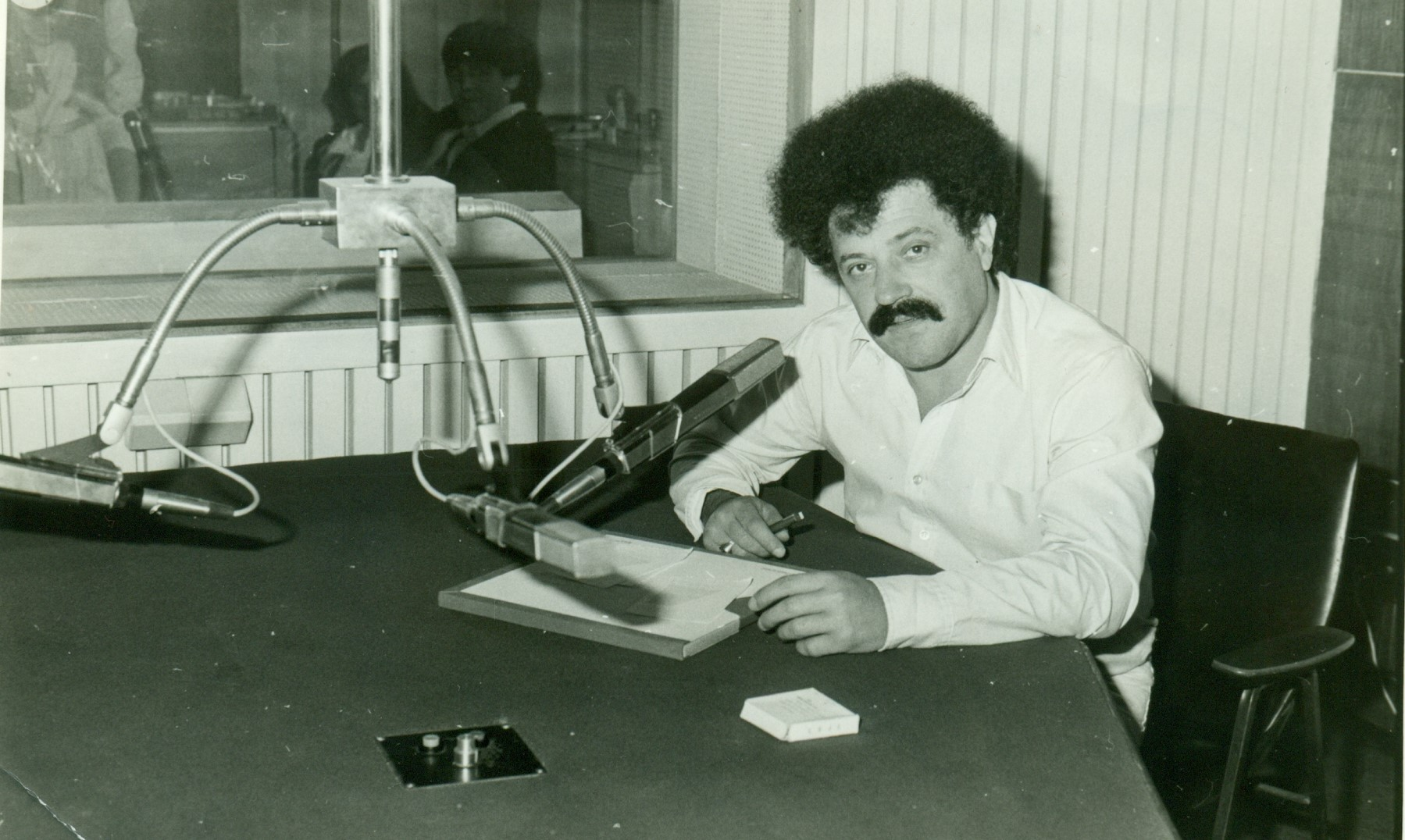
Čičak circa mid-1980s, taping an episode of Šarada akustika — his weekly Radio Sarajevo show.

Besides his experiences with Barutana and collaboration with Indexi, Čičak was a winner of a European competition of DJs in the Istrian city of Rovinj. He showed a great interest in working as a music radio host, and his journey to achieving this started in 1974 at Radio Sarajevo. Here, he initially hosted Pop Orion and then Attention Please, Mind the Dynamite on the Vinyl, Ballads in the Shadow of Skyscrapers, and Joyful Electronics. When Radio Sarajevo started its late-night programme in 1981, Čičak was among the few to jump in. He helped Radio Sarajevo with his spirit, but he was also helped by them to make his name in the music realm of Yugoslavia. His late-night program started with a show called Discothèque at 2:30, which was an introduction to Charade of acoustic, which thousands of people from Slovenia to Macedonia tuned into during the prime time between 4.30 p.m. and 6.00 p.m.

He subsequently started travelling to different places within the former Yugoslavia with his "flying" discothèque called Top Rock Disco Show. The perception of music critics and thousands of listeners encouraged Čičak to undertake yet another endeavor – to discover and promote rising stars. From 1977 to 1982 at the Sloga cultural club, in downtown Sarajevo, Čičak paved the way for a new generation of rock musicians to show their talent. Young musicians and rock groups to be, from those garage bands to the school ones, were dreaming of having an opportunity to present themselves at Sloga. Those who were proven got the opportunity – including Žaoka (Sting), Flota (Fleet), Top (Canon), Kako kad, Mali print (Small Prince), Rock Apoteka (Rock Pharmacy), Tina, Ozbiljno Pitanje (A Serious Question), Linija života (Life Line), Posljednji autobus (The Last Bus), Lucifer, and Velika Porodica (The Big Family). This competition of its own had helped forge new domestic pop-rock concepts and shaped up later to be among the bigger pop-rock bands in the former Yugoslavia – Zabranjeno Pušenje, Plavi orkestar, Crvena jabuka, Bombaj Štampa, Valentino, Gino Banana, and singer Mladen Vojičić Tifa...They had also opened the door of fame to somewhat at the time smaller bands who just later gained their fame- Vatreni Poljubac, Divlje jagode, Film, Buldožer, Galija...

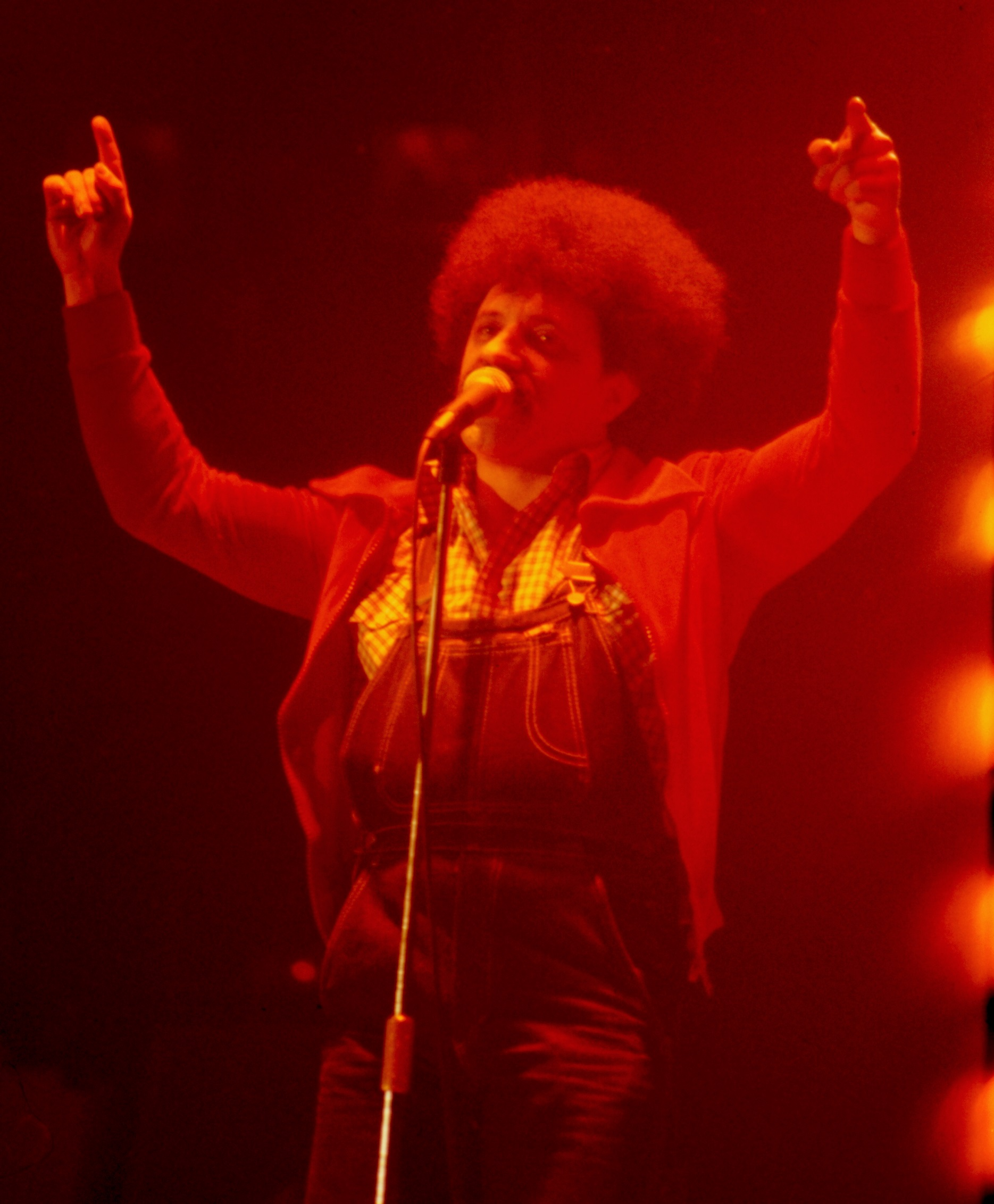
Čičak onstage at Sloga Club in Sarajevo in 1978

Čičak continued to spread new narratives and discover new territories. At Đuro Đaković Workers' University Amphitheatre, from 1977 to 1980, he organized lectures about the world and domestic trends in pop-rock music. As a journalist and music critic, Čičak was publishing articles and editorials in almost all leading newspapers and magazines in Sarajevo and former Yugoslavia – VEN, Večernje novine, Svijet, Oslobođenje, Džuboks, and Rock.

In 1984, the year of the Fourteenth Olympic Winter Games in Sarajevo, Čičak took over the editorial direction of the Youth Centre Skenderija (Dom Mladih) where he worked from 1984 to 1992. By this time, Čičak was an established figure in the music scene, while Sarajevo, despite being smaller than Zagreb and Belgrade, had a vibrant music scene and was becoming an important cultural centre in Yugoslavia. At Dom Mladih, Čičak organised several traditional music festivals that gained wider significance within the Yugoslav music scene: "Yu heavy metal fest" (1986-1991) and "Festival of pop-rock bands of BIH – significant newcomers" or in the native language "Nove nade nove snage" (Dom mladih 1984–1992). The festival featured or helped launch the careers of several musicians and bands such as Dino Merlin, Hari Mata Hari, Konvoj (Convoy), Regina (Bosnia and Herzegovina band), Letu štuke, Protest (Demonstration), Knock Out (Apokalipsa), Rupa u zidu – (Damir Avdić Diplomatz) illustrating the role of Dom Mladih and Čičak's Significant Newcomers festival in the development of Sarajevo's modern music scene.

== Rock marathons (1979, 1984, 1989) ==
An event that was special in Želimir Altarac Čičak's entire career belongs to Rock Marathons organized under the banner: "Ž.A. Čičak – with a little help from my friends".

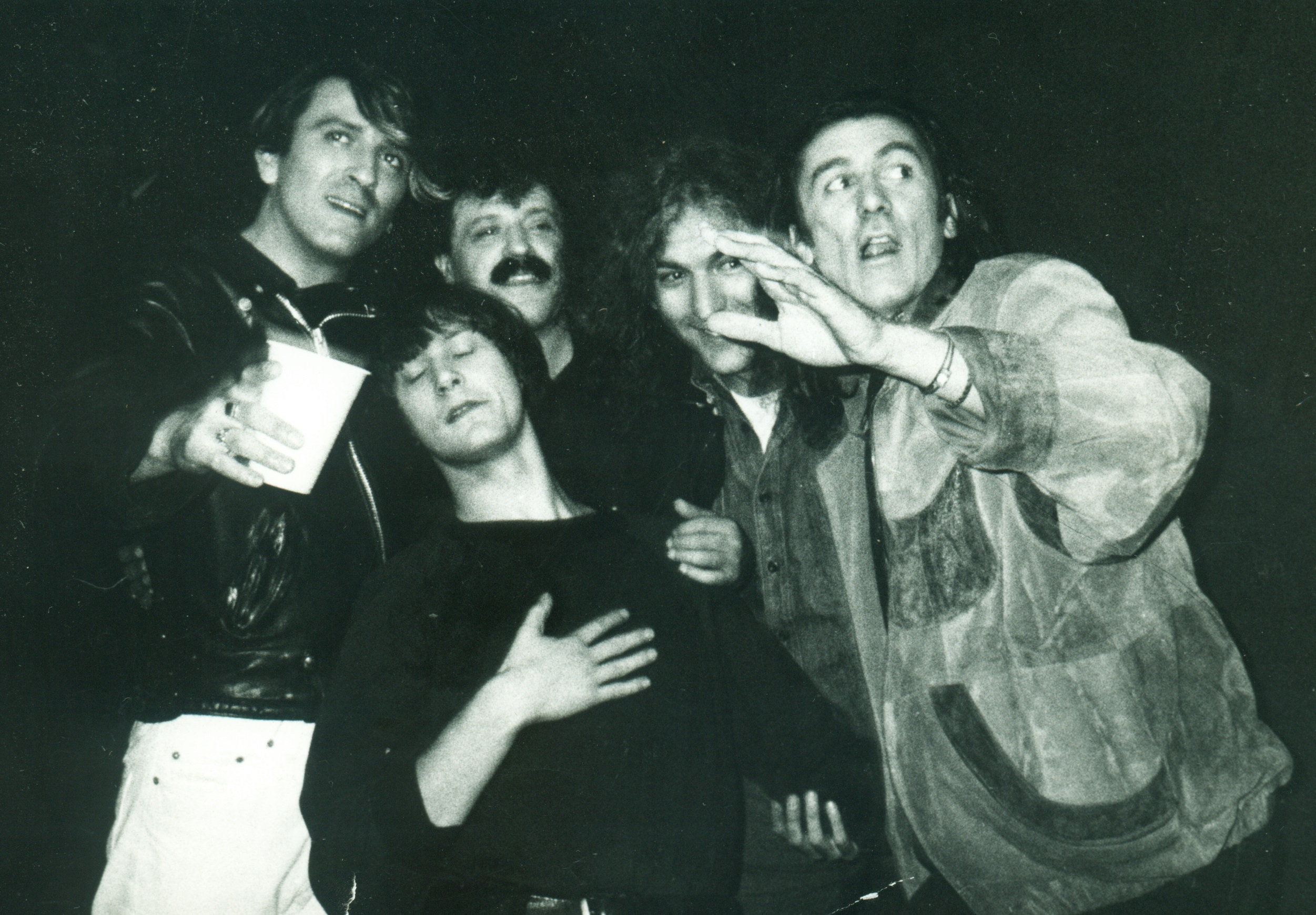
Čičak with Tifa, Davor Gobac, Bruno Langer, and Đuro at the YU rock marathon event at Zetra in October 1989.

Every five years, exactly on his working jubilee, Čičak was organizing a ten-hour-long program with all musicians from former Yugoslavia who either started off with his help or who appreciated in a particular way his contribution to the profession. The first one was organised at the Youth Center at Skenderija on January 18, 1979, where many friends showed up, most of whom were genuine representatives of Sarajevo music school: Indexi, Vatreni Poljubac, Divlje jagode, Cod, Formula 4, Jadranka Stojaković, Slobodan Samardžić & Narcis Vučina...

The second one took place on November 24, 1984, in overcrowded Skenderija, where, now famous veterans, Indexi played their hits alongside renowned pop-rock bands: Bajaga I Instruktori, U škripcu, Slomljena Stakla, Elvis J. Kurtovich, Kongres, Gino banana, Leb i sol, Laboratorija Zvuka, Drugi način, Galija, Vatreni Poljubac, Teška Industrija, Resonance, Formula 4... The third one took place at the largest hall in Sarajevo, "Zetra" on October 14, 1989. Throughout a ten-hour program, almost all relevant musicians from former Yugoslavia showed up – from Indexi and Riblja Čorba to Atomsko sklonište, YU Grupa, Galija, Vatreni Poljubac, Jura Stublić i Film, Le cinema, Zabranjeno Pušenje, Psihomodo Pop, Hari Mata Hari, Tifa Band, Formula 4, Bambinosi, Rusija, Konvoj... Especially, need to emphasize that all participants of his jubilee concerts, which include champions of pop rock music and new names of BiH and the former Yugoslav scene, played their music for free as a sign of successful cooperation in many years.

== Wartime ==
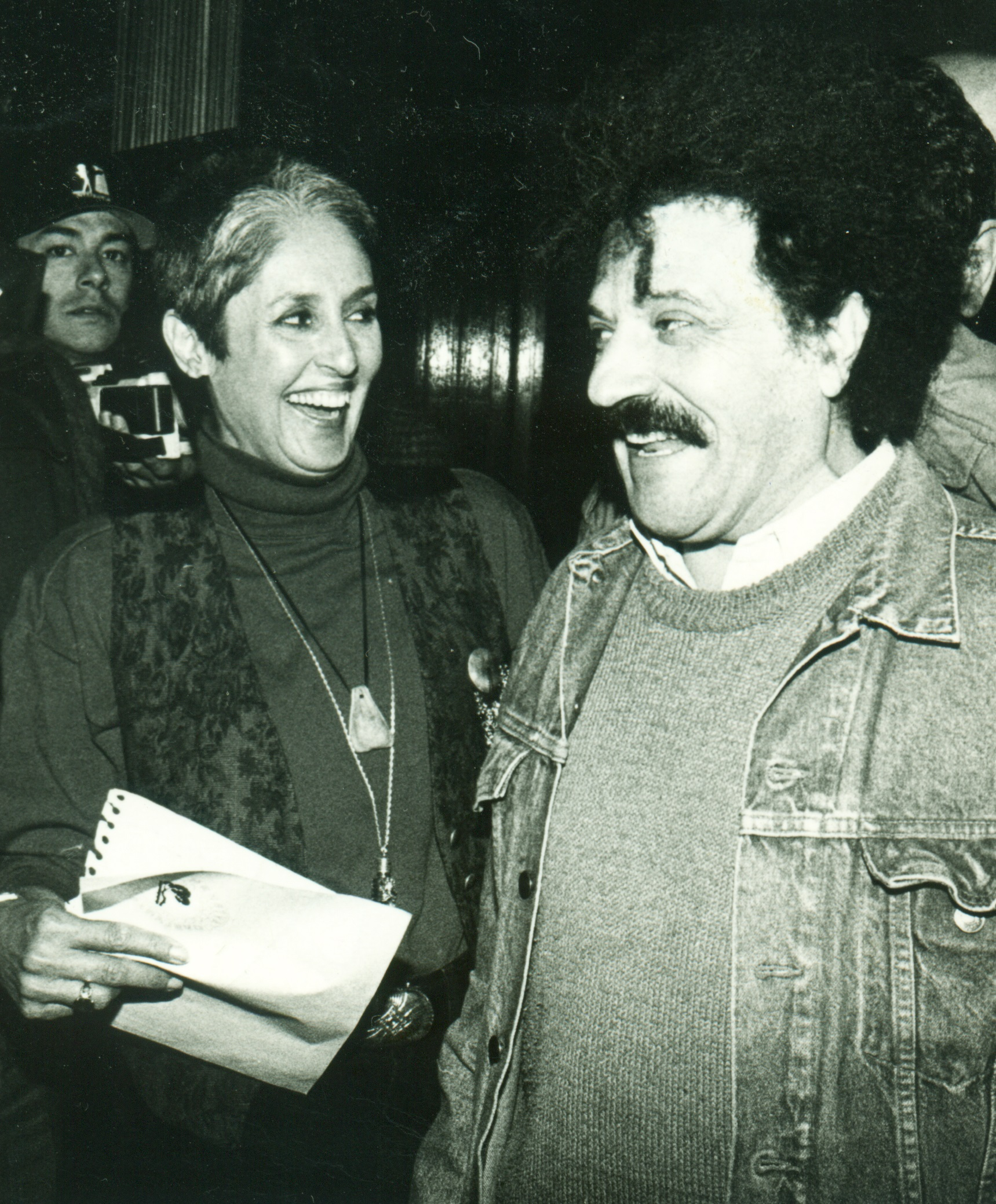
Želimir Altarac Čičak and Joan Baez before her concert appearance in wartime Sarajevo, April 14, 1993

Čičak rediscovered his own way to fight against the gloomy days of besieged and suffocated Sarajevo. He continued organizing concerts at Sloga and hosting many radio shows when there was electricity to allow them to be broadcast. From 1993 to 1995 at Sarajevo's radio station The Wall, he was the editor and host of the show Rock 'n' roll radio, which he called, thanks to blackouts in those years, Accumulator Radio. Still, in polls among listeners, it was the most listened to radio show in those years. The same thing happened with his TV Show on NTV 99 Above the Clouds (1996–1997). He was the organizer of the first rock concert during the war (March 23, 1993) at Chamber Theater 55, entitled Give Peace a Chance, which gathered all musicians who stayed in war-torn Sarajevo. A special event was a concert of Joan Baez on April 14, 1993, in the cinema hall Imperial, that attracted the attention of the world media.

== U2 concert, the football match between Bosnian and Italian singers, and Deep Purple ==
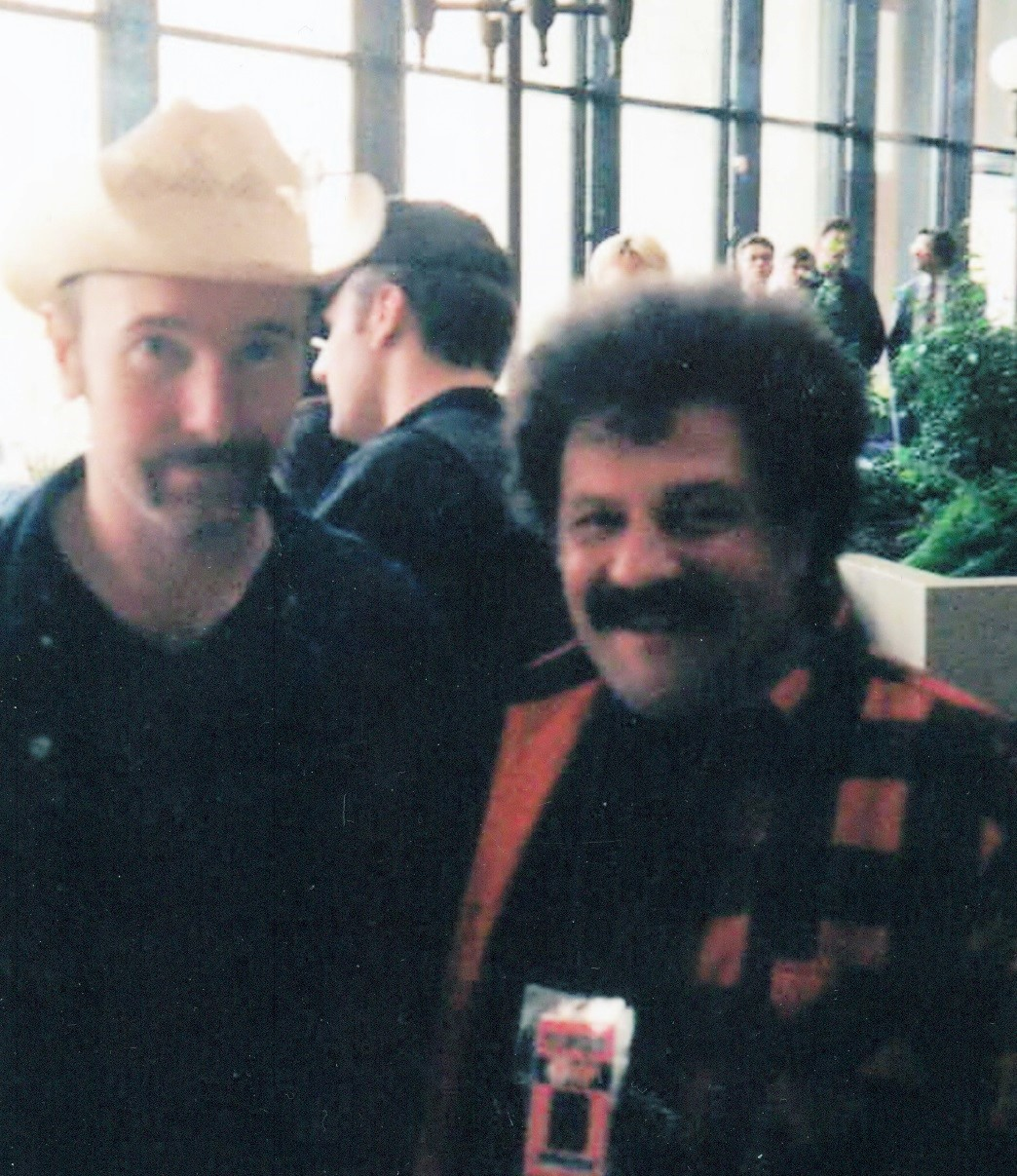
The Edge, guitarist of the U2 band, and Želimir Altarac Čičak, September 23, 1997, Sarajevo

From 2006 onwards, every Friday from 4.30 p.m. to 6.00 p.m., Čičak hosted the radio show Izvan Vremena ('Out of Time') on the so-called Open Network, composed of many networked radio stations in BiH that simultaneously broadcast the same show, enhancing coverage to all corners of the country. As he had helped Indexi to emerge as one of the most significant Yu rock bands, with the same passion and dedication, he worked on their comeback immediately after the War. Čičak organised their first comeback concert at the Bosnian Cultural Centre, downtown Sarajevo, on February 2 and 3, 1996.

He was the organizer of the concert "Rock no War" and the Italian star Paolo Belli at the Sloga Club on March 17, 1996. As a promoter, he participated in organizing the concert of the Irish rock stars U2 at Koševo Stadium on September 23, 1997. He organized and promoted the musical and sports spectacle "Meeting of Harts", the first football match between singers squads of Italia and BiH on October 19, 1998, at Grbavica stadium, a Deep Purple concert at Zetra on November 3, 2007, and a concert of Joan Baez in the traditional manifestation Baščaršija Nights (Baščaršijske noći) on July 16, 2008. He was also the organizer of numerous visits from BiH to concerts of world music stars in neighbouring states.

Until 1983, he was a free artist, and from that year until 1994, he was the organizer of musical programs at the Youth Center in Sarajevo (Dom Mladih Sarajevo). From 1994 to 2007, he worked in the news agency BIH PRESS, which later became the Federal News agency FENA, as a promoter, journalist, and editor-in-chief of the e-magazine for culture BIH KULT.

He published his autobiography, Antique Shop of Dreams, which describes his participation in the rise of Sarajevo, Bosnia and Herzegovina, and the ex-yu rock-pop scene from the 1960s. The book was promoted on 25 November 2017 at the book trade fair "Books in shelves". At a subsequent promotion concert in Sarajevo, some of his associates guest-performed without fees.

== Gallery ==
Meetings at the concerts with rock stars

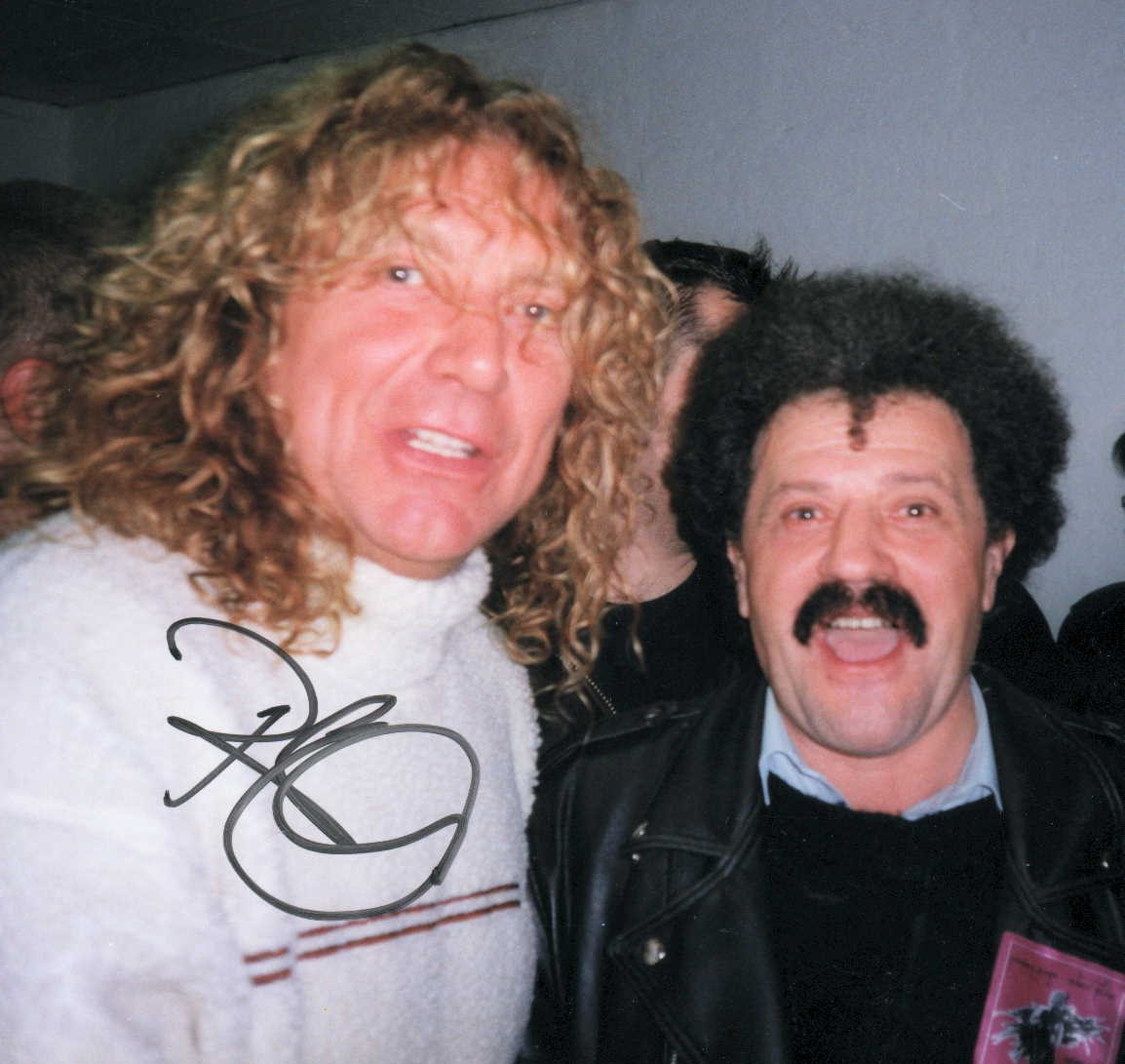
Robert Plant and Želimir Altarac Čičak, February 21, 1998, Zagreb

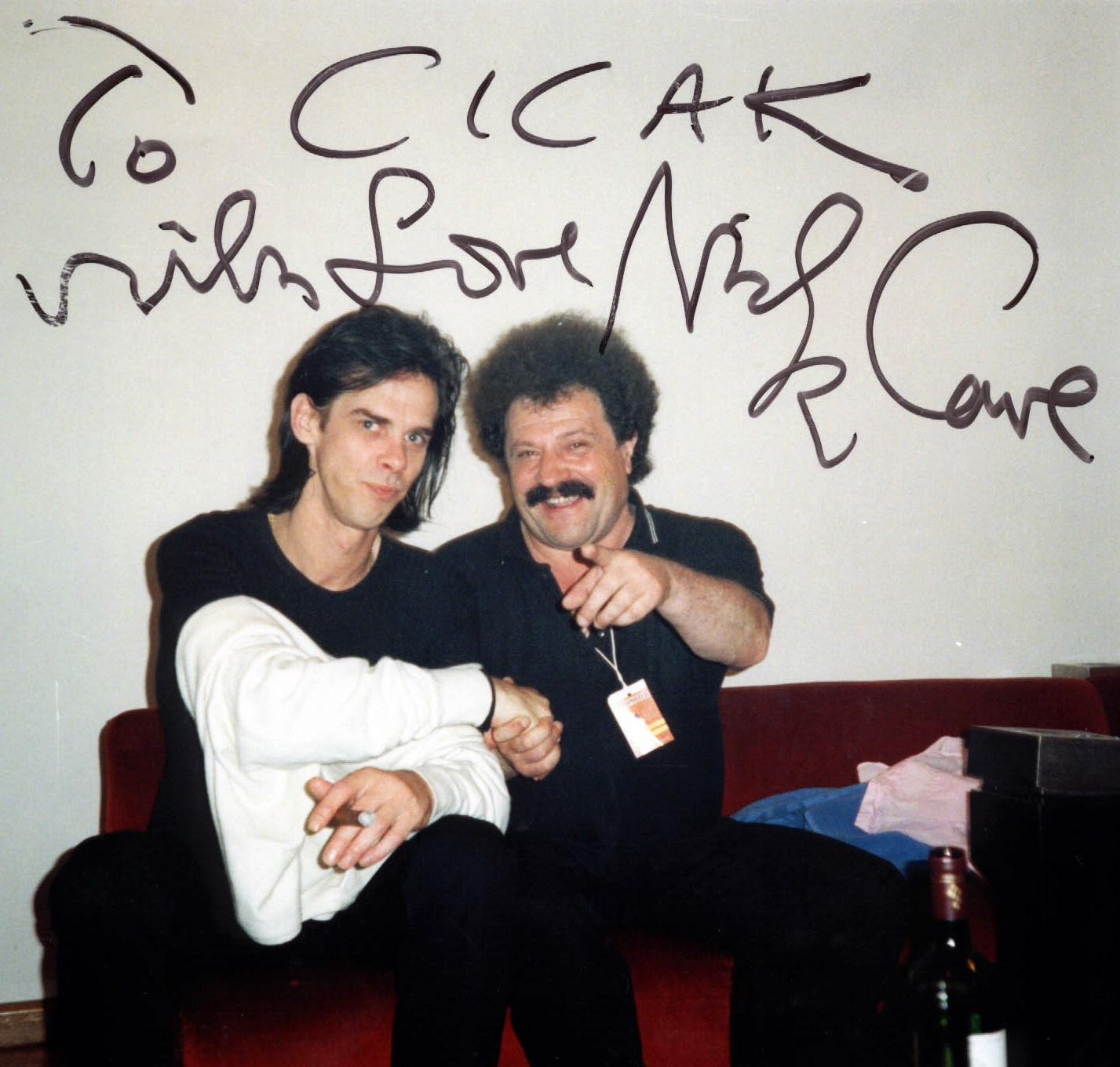
Nick Cave and Želimir Altarac Čičak, June 8, 1997, Zagreb

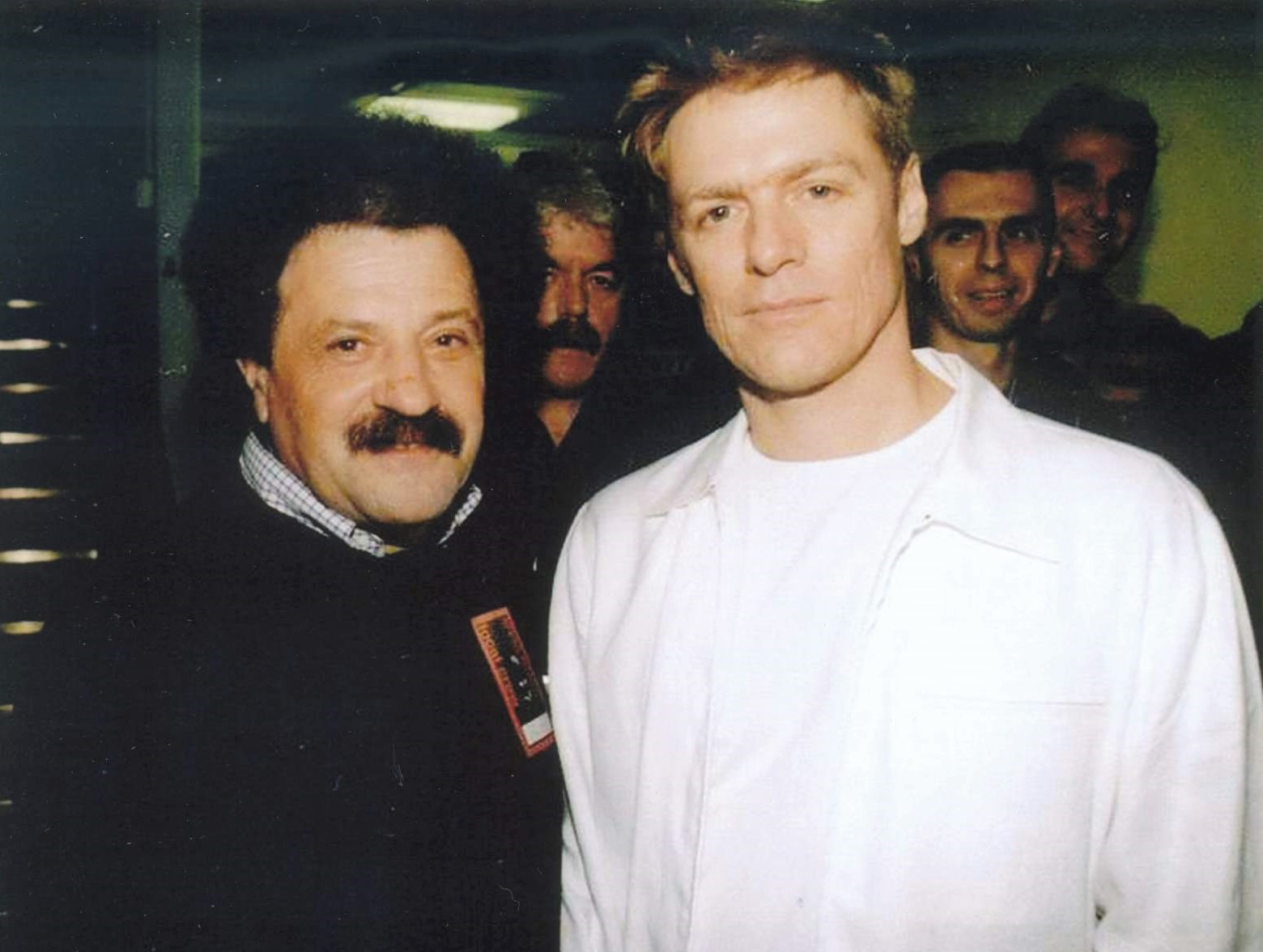
Bryan Adams and Želimir Altarac Čičak, October 30, 2000, Zagreb

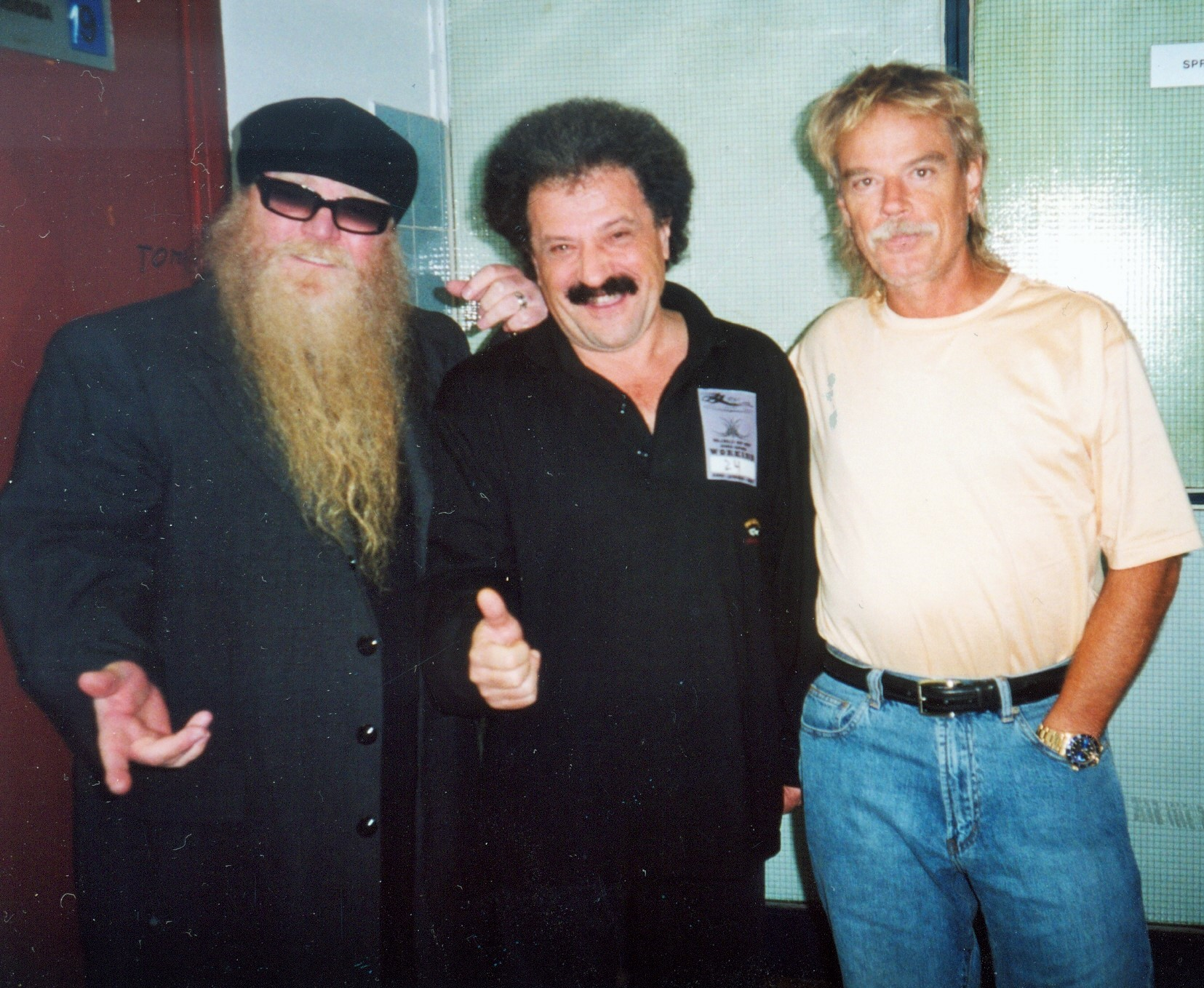
ZZ Top and Želimir Altarac Čičak, October 24, 2002, Zagreb

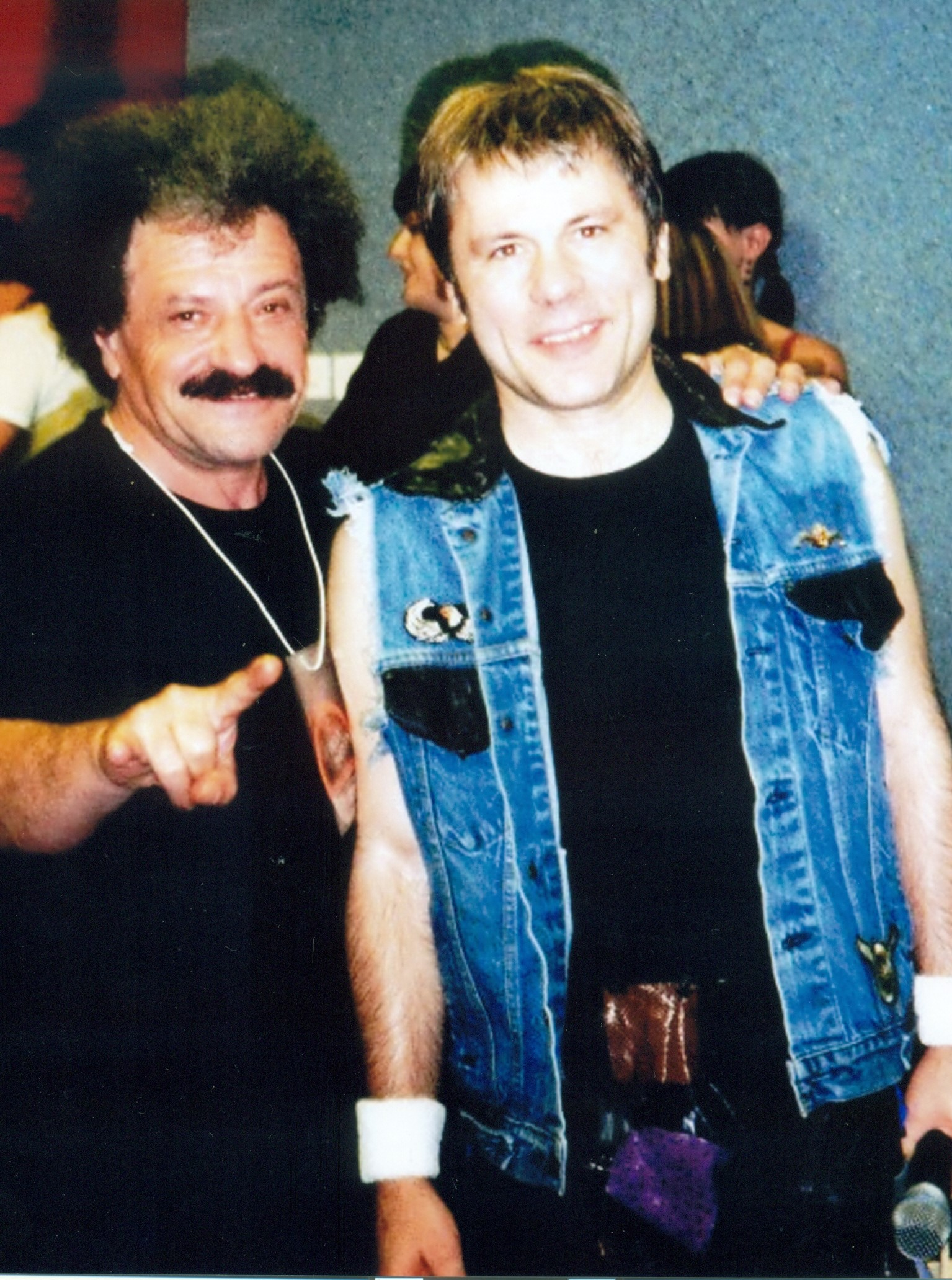
Bruce Dickinson and Želimir Altarac Čičak, June 17, 2003, Zagreb

== Awards ==
- City of Sarajevo 6th of April Award from 1980. (Spomen placenta grade Sarajevo 06. april 1980.)
- The Gold Medal of Labour from 1983.by the Presidency of BiH (Zlatna Medalja rada (1983.-Predsjedništvo SFRJ)
- The Art Award of BIH from 1990. (1990.–Savez Udruženja Estradnih Radnika SRBIH)
- The Golden Lilly of the Sarajevo -Center County from 1996. (Zlatni Ljiljan 1996. – Općina Centar Sarajevo),
- Davorin 2005 – The special award for affirmation of pop-rock culture (Posebna Nagrada za Afirmaciju BiH pop-rock culture)

== About Želimir Altarac Čičak in various literature, lexicons etc. ==
- Antique Shop of Dreams ( Antikvarnica snova) autobiography/monography – Želimir Altarac Čičak, Sarajevo: publishing house Dobra kniga – ISBN 978-9958-27-384-1
- Biography Lexicon of Who is Who in BiH 2014.-2018,Tešanj(pp. 29–30): Publishing House Planjax Commerc – ISBN 978-9958-34-132-8
- Indexi – in despise to years: a documentary biography in four parts, Dujmović, Josip, Zenica: publishing house The Library of Zenica, 2016., ISBN 978-9926-423-04-9, pp. 17,116,125,126,131,133,135,141,162,163,164,231,249,260,301,302,333,334,335,346.
- Sarajevo my City 6– A Virtuoso on Guitar and Romantic, Sarajevo: Publishing House Rabic, 2016. ISBN 978-9926-428-00-6, pp. 153-160.
- A closing time in Sarajevo, Janković, Nenad alias Dr. Nele Karajlić, Beograd: publishing house Laguna ISBN 978-86-521-1564-8 and Novosti a.d., 2014. ISBN 978-86-7446-241-6, pp. 125,126,127,130.
- If you were me, Vesić, Dušan, Zagreb: publishing house Ljevak, d.o.o., 2014. ISBN 978-953-303-751-6, pp. 08,30,199
- Sarajevo My City 3- One of those days – Sloga of our youth, Sarajevo: publishing house Rabic, 2014. ISBN 978-9958-33-084-1, pp.193-201.
- Indexi – In despise to years-a biography of Indexi, Dujmović, Josip, Sarajevo: publishing house Quattro Media, 2006., ISBN 9958-9113-0-2, pp. 8, 101, 102, 108, 109, 114, 116, 117, 125, 140, 148, 183, 184, 193, 207, 215, 244, 249, 250.
- Indexi – In despise to years- Photo Monography, Dujmović, Josip:, Sarajevo: publishing house Quattro Media Sarajevo, 2006., – pp. 7,61,67,101,110,114,135,142,161,171,227 (ISBN 9958-9113-1-0)
- When the rock was young, Škarica Siniša, Zagreb: publishing house V.B.Z. Zagreb, 2005., ISBN 953-201-517-5, pp. 142, 177
- The first BH pop-rock lexicon, Misirlić, Amir, publishing house Hercegtisak, 2004., ISBN 9958-780-11-9, pp. 2, 13, 46, 59, 77, 81, 106, 115, 151.
- Ex Yu rock enciklopedija 1960–2006, Janjatović, Petar, Beograd:publishing house Čigoja štampa 2007. ISBN 978-86-905317-1-4, p. 105
- Lexicon of Yu Mithology, Beograd Publishing houses Rende, Postscriptum, 2004. (National Library Belgrad ISBN 86-83897-24-9), Nacional Library Zagreb ISBN 953-99584-0-7), pp. 96, 248
- Music-Importance and Development of Sarajevo Pop Rock Scene, Sarajevo: Music Academy, 1997 – pp. 137,138,139,140,141.
- Significance And Development Of The Sarajevo Pop Rock Music Scene, Sarajevo: AINFSN, pub. AVICENA, – Open Society Soros Sarajevo,1994. Nr.647, pp. 143,144,145,146,147.
- Sarajevo War Drama – The second part, Miličević, Hrvoje, Sarajevo:1993. Pp. 143,144,145.
