= Željko Bebek =

Bosnian musician (born 1945)

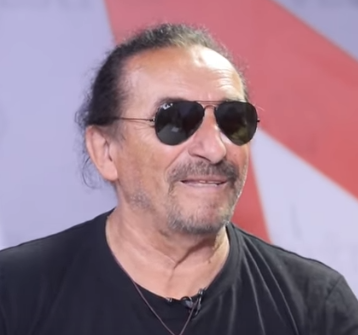
- Bebek in Niš in July 2019 during a television appearance.
- Born: Želimir Bebek; 16 December 1945 (age 80); Sarajevo, PR Bosnia and Herzegovina, FPR Yugoslavia
- Other name: Željko
- Musical career
- Genres: Rock, pop, disco, pop-folk
- Occupation: Singer
- Instruments: Vocals, guitar, bass, mandolin
- Years active: 1965–present
- Labels: Jugoton, PGP-RTB, Diskoton, Croatia Records, Taped Pictures

Želimir "Željko" Bebek (born 16 December 1945) is a Bosnian and Croatian vocalist and musician most notable for being the lead singer of the Yugoslav rock band Bijelo Dugme from 1974 until 1984. He has since maintained a successful folk-pop solo career.

== Early years ==
Bebek was born in Sarajevo, PR Bosnia and Herzegovina, FPR Yugoslavia to parents Zvonimir and Katarina. His family were Herzegovinian Croats originating near Ljubuški. He showed an early interest in music, entertaining his mother's house guests by singing songs he had been hearing on the radio. He also experimented with harmonica but abandoned it in third grade of primary school, preferring to play guitar and sing along. His teacher, however, discouraged such intentions so Željko ended up playing mandolin instead. He soon became the school's best mandolin player and was allowed to play guitar as a reward.

At age sixteen, Bebek began taking the stage at Eho 61, an open mic club-like school activity for the musically inclined students of Sarajevo's Second Gymnasium. A couple of years earlier, the same stage had seen a performance by teenage Kornelije Kovač who would later also go on to become a famous musician and composer.

Bebek's next musical activity came in a nameless band with Šento Borovčanin and the Redžić brothers—Fadil and Zoran. Bebek carried on playing with the band until Fadil Redžić left to join Indexi.

== Career ==
=== Kodeksi ===
In 1965, Eduard "Edo" Bogeljić invited twenty-year-old Bebek to join a cover band he had started, called Kodeksi, that also featured Ismeta Dervoz on backing vocals and Luciano Paganotto on drums.

Bebek spent several years singing and playing rhythm guitar with the band, helping them become quite prominent locally in the city of Sarajevo. As Kodeksi experienced persistent problems filling the bass guitar spot, Bebek recommended eighteen-year-old Goran Bregović after seeing the teenager play with Beštije in 1969. It would be the beginning of Bebek's long professional association with Bregović that would frequently turn tumultuous.

In fall 1970, after falling out with band mates during the group's stay in Italy, Bebek left Kodeksi and returned home to Sarajevo.

==== Novi Kodeksi ====
Shortly after getting back to Sarajevo, Bebek established Novi Kodeksi with another former Kodeksi member Edo Bogeljić. Conceptualized as a return to the original Kodeksi cover repertoire, Bogeljić's and Bebek's band gigged around Sarajevo with diminishing success as the audiences' general taste seemingly moved away from cover music; although at one point they did break a record for the length of performance, spending 32 straight hours playing on stage with break.

The new year 1971 brought more creative stagnation as their repertoire still consisted entirely of foreign covers. In December 1971, Bebek received a notice from the Yugoslav People's Army (JNA) to report for his mandatory military service and Novi Kodeksi played their last gig at Sarajevo's Dom Mladih. Twenty-six years of age at this point, Bebek got married with the intention of settling down and giving up on trying to make a living via playing music altogether.

=== Jutro ===
Just as he was about to report for the obligatory army duty in early 1972, twenty-six-year-old Bebek received an invitation from Bregović—whom he hadn't spoken to in a year-and-a-half at that point, ever since their split in Italy—to record "Patim, evo, deset dana" song with Jutro, a new band Bregović had been in the process of forming with Nuno Arnautalić. Bebek accepted, recorded vocals in a studio, and then, in late February 1972, reported for his army stint in Pirot.

Returning home upon being discharged from the army in March 1973, Bebek joined Jutro in earnest but also took a clerical job in a governmental institution as a steady source of income due to not being certain about the band's creative and commercial potential. Jutro did become successful and he eventually quit the public sector job to again devote to music full-time. Jutro soon transformed into Bijelo dugme, with Bebek as a founding member.

=== Bijelo Dugme ===
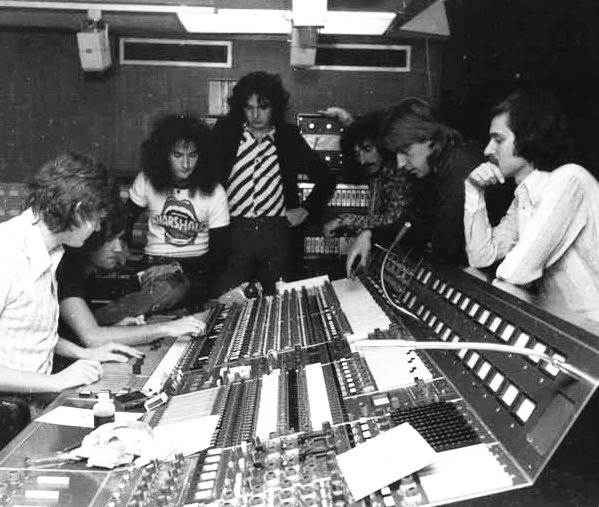
Bebek (third from right) alongside fellow Bijelo Dugme bandmates and other collaborators in London's AIR Studios on Oxford Street in November 1975 during the recording of Šta bi dao da si na mom mjestu

Bebek continued as vocalist and occasional bassist in Bijelo dugme from its inception in 1974. Bebek found himself to be a country-wide celebrity. He ended up spending a full decade and recording six studio albums with the band before eventually leaving in April 1984 to fully pursue a solo career.

=== Solo career ===
Bebek maintains a successful solo career, which began during the late 1970s in parallel with his work in Bijelo Dugme.

==== While with Bijelo Dugme ====
In 1978, while Bijelo Dugme bandleader Bregović was away serving his Yugoslav People's Army (JNA) stint that forced the band on hiatus, Bebek decided to use the time off to record a solo album, Skoro da smo isti, with drummer Điđi Jankelić, old friend Edo Bogeljić on guitar, and Neven Pocrnjić on keyboards. Featuring songs written and composed by Bebek, the material was prepared in Bugojno, Sarajevo, and Borike throughout February, March and April 1978. It was then recorded in Jugoton studios in Zagreb from late April until mid May 1978 with Bebek himself handling the production and playing bass in addition to singing. The album was released by Jugoton on 28 July 1978 but failed both critically and commercially, selling only 6,000 copies and quickly falling into oblivion. Though Bebek and his collaborators had planned a Yugoslavia-wide tour in support of the album, their plans were scrapped following the poor reception.

In late 1983, amid turmoil within Bijelo Dugme, Bebek returned to solo work by recording his second solo album, Mene tjera neki vrag, with Generacija 5's guitarist Dragan Jovanović, former Smak and Bijelo Dugme keyboardist Laza Ristovski, Bijelo Dugme drummer Ipe Ivandić, and bassist Sanin Karić. Produced by Saša Habić, the album was released by PGP-RTB in 1984. Featuring tracks composed by Dragan Ilić as well as the Zana duo Zoran Živanović and Radovan Jovićević, in addition to lyrics by Alka Vuica and Marina Tucaković, the album had a lukewarm commercial reception with only the title track managing to become a moderate radio hit in Yugoslavia.

In parallel with recording his second solo album, Bebek recorded a pop duet with Zana Nimani, "Jabuke i vino". Written by Jovićević and Živanović from Zana and released as a single, the song became an immediate hit and would eventually go on to reach evergreen status in Yugoslavia.

==== After leaving Bijelo Dugme ====
Throughout his 11-album solo run, Bebek had several major hits, most of them occurring in the 1984–1989 period. Most of his hits had a strong commercial folk influence, including "Oprosti mi što te volim", "Da je sreće bilo", "Laku noć svirači", "Jabuke i vino" (duet with Zana Nimani), "Sinoć sam pola kafane popio" (with lyrics by Bora Đorđević), "Da zna zora" (duet with Halid Bešlić)", "Čaša otrova", "Gdje će ti duša", and others. Also he had several hit ballads like "Žuta Ruža", "I Bog je od nas digao ruke", "Šta je meni ovo trebalo", "Lagano umirem", "Tko je mene prokleo", and "Ne idi sad".

When the Yugoslav wars started, he moved to Zagreb where he continues to live and work. His record labels included Taped Pictures and Croatia Records.

==== 2005 Bijelo Dugme reunion ====
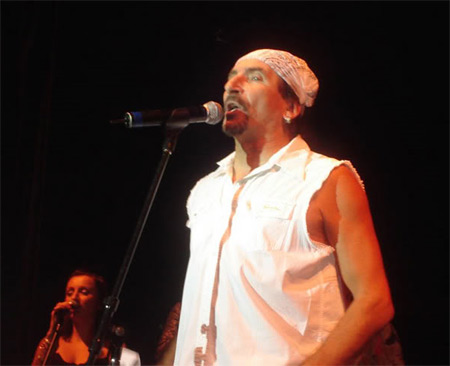
Bebek performing in 2009

In 2005 he took part in three large reunion concerts of Bijelo dugme, in Zagreb, Sarajevo and Belgrade, performing alongside most of the musicians that passed through the band, including the other two vocalists (Alen Islamović and Tifa).

==== B.A.T., Bijelo Dugme tribute ====
During 2006, Bebek (in collaboration with Alen Islamović and Tifa) formed a Bijelo dugme tribute band called "B.A.T." (stands for Bebek, Alen, Tifa), which performed on numerous stages around the world between 2006 and 2010. Their 2006 "Kad Bi' Bio Bijelo Dugme" North American tour (together with Okus Meda and Tifa Band), was featured in a documentary titled "B.A.T.: Balkan Rock Nostalgia", (directed by Serb-American filmmaker Branislav R. Tatalović). Bebek was one of the three featured performers alongside Alen Islamovic, and Tifa, in a documentary that followed the musicians while they were on tour.

During 2012, after recording a duet with Crvena Jabuka, Bebek met their producer, Branimir Mihaljević, and together they started working on what will become Bebek's new studio album, first after twelve years. Album entitled Kad poljubac pomiješaš sa vinom was released in late 2012. Some of the songs on the album include "Gdje sam bio", "Kaldrma", "Tango" (duet with Severina Vučković), "Začarani krug" and others.

== Personal life ==
Bebek has been married three times.

With his first wife, Spomenka, he has a daughter Silvija, born in 1974.

By the early 1980s, Bebek's marriage with Spomenka was over as he entered into a relationship with Sandra Priganić, an economics student at the University of Sarajevo. The couple had a child, daughter Bjanka, born out-of-wedlock in 1981. The two got married in 1984 in a civil ceremony with the wedding reception held at Sarajevo's Kineski Restoran. Priganić soon began working as an economist at Šipad Inženjering in Sarajevo. With the disintegration of SFR Yugoslavia and outbreak of the Bosnian War in 1992, forty-six-year-old Bebek and his wife and daughter fled their hometown Sarajevo for Zagreb, Croatia and remained living there. During early-to-mid 1990s, the couple opened a restaurant at the Eugen Kvaternik Square in Zagreb before divorcing.

In 1997, fifty-two-year-old Bebek met eighteen-year-old Duvno-born Ružica, 34 years his junior, reportedly when she approached him for a photo after a show. The two soon began dating and got married in April 2002 in Dubrovnik. The couple has a son, Zvonimir, and daughter, Katarina, named after Bebek's parents.

From the mid-1990s onwards, Bebek has faced multiple rejections on his applications for the cultural worker (samostalni umjetnik) status in Croatia, a legal provision for country's prominent artists entitling them to various financial benefits from the state budget. One of the rejections was accompanied with an explanation that he "hasn't sufficiently contributed to Croatian music". Bebek has been vocal in Croatian media about his displeasure that the status continues to elude him.

== Discography ==
=== With Bijelo Dugme ===
==== Studio albums ====
- Kad bi bio bijelo dugme (1974)
- Šta bi dao da si na mom mjestu (1975)
- Eto! Baš hoću! (1976)
- Bitanga i princeza (1979)
- Doživjeti stotu (1980)
- Uspavanka za Radmilu M. (1983)

=== Solo ===
==== Studio albums ====
- Skoro da smo isti (1978)
- Mene tjera neki vrag (1984)
- Armija B (1985)
- Niko više ne sanja (1989)
- Pjevaj moj narode (1989)
- Karmin pjesma i rakija (1990)
- ...A svemir miruje (1992)
- Gori svijet ti ćeš ga ugasiti (1993)
- Puca mi u glavi (1995)
- S tobom i bez tebe (1999)
- Ošini po prašini (2000)
- Kad poljubac pomiješaš sa vinom (2012)
- Ono nešto naše (2017)
- Mali oblak ljubavi (2021)

==== Singles ====
Title	Year	Peak chart positions	Album
Title	Year	CRO	Album
"Dunavom"	2019	3	Non-album single
