= Youth Centre Skenderija =

Youth centre in Sarajevo, Bosnia and Herzegovina

Dom Mladih
- Dom Mladih
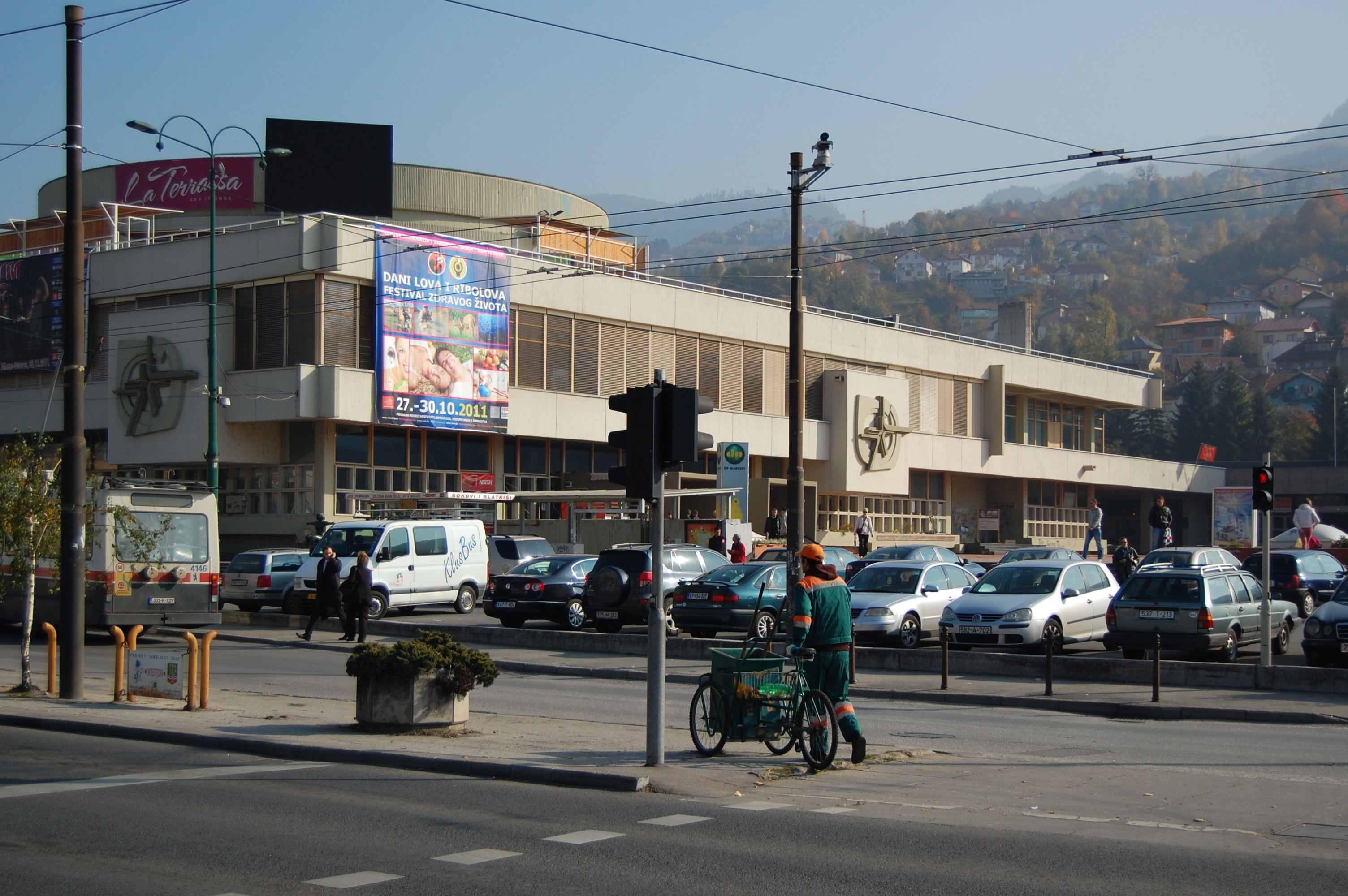
- Dom Mladih at the Skenderija plateau in October 2011.
- Interactive map of Dom Mladih
- Location: Sarajevo, Bosnia and Herzegovina
- Coordinates: 43°51′19.5″N 18°24′52.54″E
- Capacity: 2,000

Construction
- Opened: November 29, 1969; 56 years ago
- Renovated: 2007

Dom Mladih ("Youth Centre Skenderija") is a multifunctional venue of modern concept and interior, located in Sarajevo, Bosnia and Herzegovina, as part of Skenderija, which is equipped with a dance hall with a capacity of 2000 visitors and the amphitheater with a capacity of up to 600 visitors.

Many pop and rock groups as well as entertainers have started their careers as unknowns in "Dom Mladih", later to become renowned musicians throughout the region and the world: Kemal Monteno, Bijelo Dugme, Dino Merlin, Indexi, Crvena jabuka, Plavi orkestar, Ambasadori, Regina, SCH and many others.

== History ==
After it was damaged during Bosnian War, it was officially reopened in 2007.
