= Indexi =

Yugoslav rock band

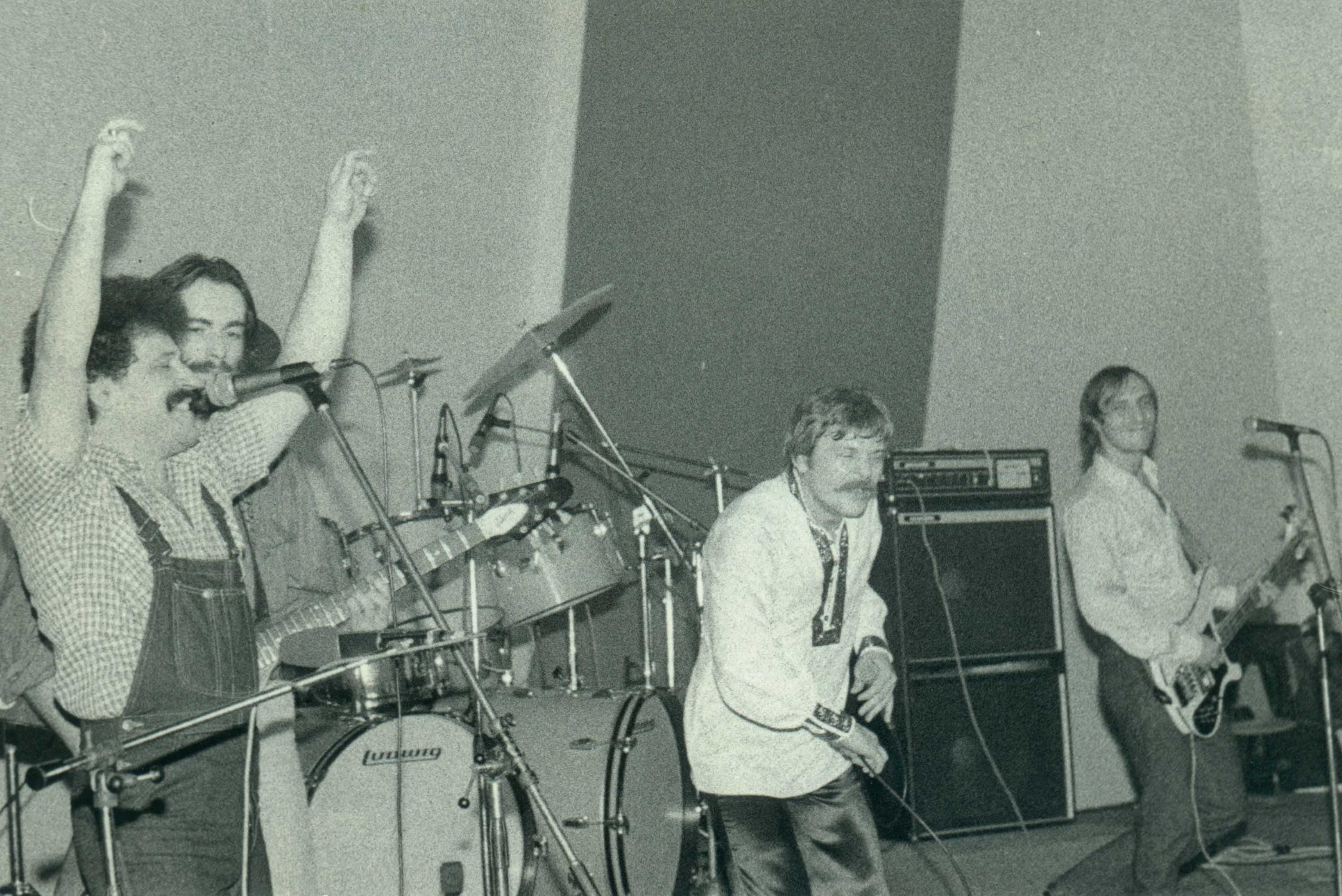
- Indexi with poet Želimir Altarac Čičak (left) in 1979

Background information
- Origin: Sarajevo, SR Bosnia and Herzegovina, SFR Yugoslavia
- Genres: Progressive rock Psychedelic rock Pop rock
- Years active: 1962–2001
- Labels: Diskoton; Jugoton; PGP-RTB
- Past members: Davorin Popović; Slobodan Kovačević; Đorđe Kisić; Fadil Redžić; Neno Jurin; Sinan Alimanović; Šefko Akšamija; Nedim Hadžihasanović; Alija Hafizović; Slobodan Misaljević; Ismet Arnautalić; Đorđe Uzelac; Vlado Pravdić; Kornelije Kovač; Đorđe Novković; Ranko Rihtman; Miroslav Maraus; Miroslav Šaranović; Milić Vukašinović; Denis Lazendić; Enco Lesić

Indexi were a Bosnian and former Yugoslav rock band popular in Yugoslavia. It formed in 1962 in Sarajevo, Bosnia and Herzegovina, and disbanded in 2001 when singer Davorin Popović died. Some of their most notable songs are "Svijet u kome živim" and "Negdje u kraju, u zatišju" with lyrics by Želimir Altarac Čičak, "Plima", "Sve ove godine", "Sanjam", "Predaj se, srce" and "Bacila je sve niz rijeku", which was later covered by many other ex-Yugoslavian groups, notably Crvena jabuka.

Indexi formed in 1962, and their name was derived from the "Indeks" which was a student's grade log. They began by making instrumental covers of popular hits, but in 1967 started composing. They were known as the "Pioneers of Psychedelic Rock", and were inspired by many bands like the Beatles, Yes, and The Guess Who.

== Members ==
=== Final lineup ===
- Đorđe Kisić – drums (1964–1968, 1977–1991, 1999–2001)
- Davorin Popović – vocals (1964–2001; his death)
- Slobodan Bodo Kovačević – lead guitar (1965–2001; died 2004)
- Sinan Alimanović – keyboards (1980–1983, 1997–2001)
- Peco Petej – drums (1995–2001)
- Davor Črnigoj – bass (1998–2001)

=== Former members ===
- Šefko Akšamija – bass (1962–1965)
- Ismet Nuno Arnautalić – rhythm guitar (1962–1969)
- Nedo Hadžihasanović – drums (1962–1963)
- Slobodan Bobo Misaljević – lead guitar (1962–1965)
- Đorđe Uzelac – keyboards (1962–1965)
- Alija Hafizović – vocals (occasionally 1963–1964)
- Fadil Redžić – bass (1965–1996)
- Kornelije Kovač – keyboards (1967–1968; died 2022)
- Đorđe Novković – keyboards (1968–1969, 1973)
- Miroslav Šaranović – drums (1968–1973)
- Ranko Rihtman – keyboards (1969–1970; later permanent associate member)
- Vlado Pravdić – keyboards (1971–1973; died 2023)
- Enco Lesić – keyboards (1971–1972, 1975)
- Miroslav Maraus – keyboards (1974)
- Milić Vukašinović – drums (1974–1975)
- Nenad Jurin – keyboards (1976–1996)
- Perica Stojanović – drums (1976)
- Sanin Karić – bass (1996–1997)

== Discography ==
=== Studio albums ===
Title	Released
Indexi	1972
Modra rijeka	1978
Kameni cvjetovi	1999

=== EPs and singles ===
Title	Released
"Sedam veličanstvenih"	1964
"Naše doba"	1967
"Ne želim tvoju ljubav"	1969
"Svijet u kojem živim"	1971
"Sve ove godine"	1972
"Sanjam"	1972
"Plima"	1972
"Predaj se srce"	1973
"Jedina moja"	1973
"Samo su ruže znale"	1974
"Pogrešan broj"	1974
"Didn-da-da"	1974
"Volim te"	1975
"Obala pusta, obala vrela"	1975
"Ti si mi bila u svemu naj, naj"	1975
"Putovi"	1976
"I mi i nas dvoje"	1976
"Samo jednom"	1977
"U jednim plavim očima"	1977
"Voljela je Sjaj u travi"	1977
"Ispijmo zlatni pehar"	1978
"Pozovi me na kafu"	1978
"Živjela Jugoslavija"	1979
"310 poljubaca"	1979
"Njene oči, usne, ruke"	1980
"Betonska brana"	1981
"Pozdravi Sonju"	1983
"U inat godinama"	2006

=== Live albums ===
Title	Released
Posljednji koncert u Sarajevu	2002
The Best Of Indexi: Live Tour 1998/1999	2009

=== Compilations ===
- Pružam ruke (1967)
- Jutro će promijeniti sve (1968)
- Krivac si ti (1972)
- Indexi (1977)
- Retrospektiva (1979)
- Sve ove godine (1986)
- Best of Indexi 1962–2001 2 CD compilation (2001)

NOTE: A large number of compilations has been released in period between 1981 and 1996

== See also ==
- Indexi (award), the Bosnian music award named after them
