= Bijelo Dugme discography =

- Studio albums: 9
- Live albums: 5
- Compilation albums: 14
- Singles: 15
- Video albums: 9
- Box sets: 4

The discography of Yugoslav rock band Bijelo Dugme consists of 9 studio albums, 4 live albums, 12 compilation albums, 12 Singles, 4 video albums, 3 box sets and 1 joint project album. The list does not include solo material or side projects performed by the members.

== Studio albums ==
Year	Album details
1974	Kad bi bio bijelo dugme: Released: November 18, 1974; Label: Jugoton; Format: LP, CS, CD
1975	Šta bi dao da si na mom mjestu: Released: December 17, 1975; Label: Jugoton; Format: LP, CS, CD
1976	Eto! Baš hoću!: Released: December 20, 1976; Label: Jugoton; Format: LP, CS, CD
1979	Bitanga i princeza: Released: March 16, 1979; Label: Jugoton; Format: LP, CS, CD
1980	Doživjeti stotu: Released: December 12, 1980; Label: Jugoton; Format: LP, CS, CD
1983	Uspavanka za Radmilu M.: Released: February 21, 1983; Label: Jugoton; Format: LP, CS, CD
1984	Bijelo Dugme: Released: December 1984; Label: Diskoton / Kamarad; Format: LP, CS, CD
1986	Pljuni i zapjevaj moja Jugoslavijo: Released: November 1986; Label: Diskoton / Kamarad; Format: LP, CS, CD
1988	Ćiribiribela: Released: November 24, 1988; Label: Diskoton / Kamarad / Komuna; Format: LP, CS, CD

== Live albums ==
Year	Album details
1977	Koncert kod Hajdučke česme: Released: December 31, 1977; Label: Jugoton; Format: LP, CS, CD
1981	5. april '81; Released: 1981; Label: Jugoton; Format: LP, CS, CD
1987	Mramor, kamen i željezo: Released: 1987; Label: Diskoton / Kamarad; Format: LP, CS, CD
2006	Turneja 2005: Sarajevo, Zagreb, Beograd: Released: December 12, 2006; Label: Music Star Production / Kamarad; Format: CD
2016	Ko ne poludi taj nije normalan!: Released: December 23, 2016; Label: Croatia Records; Format: CD, Digital

== Compilation albums ==
Year	Album details
1975	Iz sve snage: Released: 1975; Label: Jugoton; Format: CS, CD
1982	Singl ploče (1974–1975): Released: 1982; Label: Jugoton; Format: LP, CS, CD
1982	Singl ploče (1976–1980): Released: 1982; Label: Jugoton; Format: LP, CS, CD
1984	Sanjao sam noćas da te nemam (Velike rock balade): Released: 1984; Label: Jugoton; Format: LP, CS, CD
1990	Nakon svih ovih godina: Released: 1990; Label: Diskoton; Format: LP, CS, CD
1994	Ima neka tajna veza: Released: 1994; Label: PGP-RTS; Format: LP, CS, CD
1994	Rock & Roll: Najveći hitovi '74 - '88: Released: 1994; Label: Croatia Records; Format: CD
1997	Balade: Released: 1997; Label: Hi-Fi Centar; Format: CD
1999	Bijelo dugme: Released: 1999; Label: Croatia Records; Format: CD
1999	Bijelo dugme 2: Released: 1999; Label: Croatia Records; Format: CD
2003	Singlice 1974 - 1980: Released: 2003; Label: Croatia Records; Format: CD
2005	Bijelo Dugme: Released: 2005; Label: Music Star Production; Format: CD
2005	'Ajmo curice, 'ajmo dječaci!: Released: 2005; Label: Croatia Records; Format: CD
2007	The Ultimate Collection: Released: 2007; Label: Croatia Records; Format: CD
2010	Najljepše ljubavne pesme: Released: 2010; Label: Croatia Records; Format: CD
2011	Rock 'n' roll hitovi: Released: 2011; Label: Jugoton Croatia Records; Format: CD
2016	40: Released: 2016; Label: Music Star Production; Format: File
2020	The Best Of: Released: 2020; Label: Music Star Production; Format: File

== Singles ==
Year	Single details
1974	"Top": B-side: "Ove ću noći naći blues"; Non-album single; Released: 1974; Label: Jugoton; Format: 7"
1974	"Glavni junak jedne knjige": B-side: "Bila mama Kukunka, bio tata Taranta"; Non-album single; Released: 1974; Label: Jugoton / Diskoton; Format: 7"
1974	"Da sam pekar": B-side: "Selma"; Non-album single; Released: 1974; Label: Jugoton; Format: 7"
1975	"Da mi je znati koji joj je vrag": B-side: "Blues za moju bivšu dragu"; A - Non-album single, B - From the album Kad bi bio bijelo dugme; Released: 1975; Label: Jugoton; Format: 7"
1975	"Ima neka tajna veza": B-side: "I kad prođe sve, pjevat' ću i tad"; Non-album single; Released: 1975; Label: Jugoton; Format: 7"
1975	"Ne gledaj me tako i ne ljubi me više": B-side: "Sve ću da ti dam samo da zaigram"; A - Non-album single, B - From the album Kad bi bio bijelo dugme; Released: 1975; Label: Jugoton; Format: 7"
1976	"Himna lista Zdravo": Non-album single; Released: 1976; Label: Jugoton / Zdravo; Format: Flexi disc
1976	"Džambo": B-side: "Vatra"; Non-album single; Released: 1976; Label: Jugoton; Format: 7"
1976	"Milovan": B-side: "Goodbye, Amerika"; Non-album single; Released: 1976; Label: Jugoton; Format: 7"
1976	"Tako ti je, mala moja, kad ljubi Bosanac": B-side: "Ne spavaj, mala moja, muzika dok svira"; A - From the album Šta bi dao da si na mom mjestu, B - From the album Kad bi bio bijelo dugme; Released: 1976; Label: Jugoton; Format: 7"
1976	"Eto! Baš hoću!": B-side: "Došao sam da ti kažem da odlazim"; A - From the album Eto! Baš hoću!, B - From the album Šta bi dao da si na mom mjestu; Released: 1976; Label: Jugoton; Format: 7"
1979	"Bitanga i princeza": B-side: "Dede bona, sjeti se, de, tako ti svega"; Non-album single; Released: 1979; Label: Jugoton; Format: 7"
1979	Lične stvari: A-side: "Pristao sam biću sve što hoće"; B-side: "Šta je tu je"; Non-album single; Released: 1979; Label: Jugoton; Format: 7"
1980	"Dobro vam jutro, Petrović Petre": B-side: "Na zadnjem sjedištu moga auta"; A - From the album Doživjeti stotu, B - From the album Bitanga i princeza; Released: 1980; Label: Jugoton; Format: 7"
1981	"Playing the Part": B-side: "Doživjeti stotu"; A - Non-album single, B - From the album Doživjeti stotu; Released: 1981; Label: Jugoton; Format: 7"
1983	"Kosovska": B-side: "Kosovska"; From the album Uspavanka za Radmilu M.; Released: 1983; Label: Jugoton; Format: 7"

== Video albums ==
Year	Album details
1983	Uspavanka za Radmilu M.: Released: 1983; Label: Jugoton; Format: VHS
1988	Ćiribiribela: Released: 1988; Label: Diskoton; Format: VHS
1990	Nakon svih ovih godina: Released: 1990; Label: Diskoton; Format: VHS
1994	Ima neka tajna veza: Released: 1994; Label: Zmex / UFA Media; Format: VHS
2005	Turneja 2005 (Sarajevo, Zagreb, Beograd): Released: 2005; Label: Music Star Production/Kamarad; Format: DVD
2005	Antologija 1 ('75-'83): Released: 2005; Label: Global Call; Format: DVD
2005	Antologija 2 ('84-'89): Released: 2005; Label: Global Call; Format: DVD
2014	Bijelo dugme: Released: 2014; Label: Croatia Records; Format: DVD
2018	Izgubljeno dugme: Released: 2018; Label: Croatia Records; Format: DVD

== Box sets ==
Year	Album details
2004	1974-2004: Released: 2004; Label: Music Star Production; Format: CD
2005	Prvih šest studijskih albuma: Released: 2005; Label: Croatia Records; Format: CD
2013	Original Album Collection: Released: 2013; Label: Croatia Records; Format: CD
2014	Bijelo Dugme Box Set Deluxe: Released: 2014; Label: Croatia Records; Format: LP

== Joint projects ==
Year	Album details
1983	...a milicija trenira strogoću! (i druge pjesmice za djecu) (with Ratimir Boršić "Rača"): Released: 1983; Label: Jugoton; Format: LP, CS
