= Samo Tomášik =

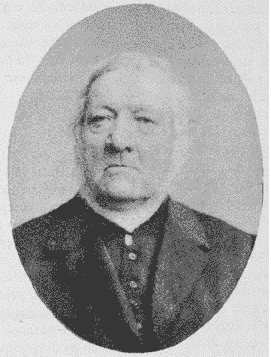
Samo Tomášik

Samo Tomášik, also known as Samuel Tomášik, pseudonyms Kozodolský, Tomášek; February 8, 1813 – September 10, 1887) was an ethnic Slovak romantic poet and prosaist from Transleithania.

Samo Tomášik – author of the song Hey, Slovaks! (short document of the Slovak Matica

Samo Tomášik was best known for writing the 1834 poem, "Hej, Slováci", which was in use since 1944 - under the title of "Hej, Sloveni" (English: "Hey, Slavs") - as the national anthem of Yugoslavia and later Serbia and Montenegro until 2006. It was also the national anthem of the First Slovak Republic from 1939 to 1945 as original version "Hej, Slováci" (English: "Hey, Slovaks")

== Early life and education ==
Samuel Tomášik was born on 8 February 1813 in Jolsvatapolca, Besztercebánya county, Austrian Empire (now Gemerské Teplice, Slovakia). His is education began in Jelšava and Gemer. He studied at secondary school in Rožňava and later he continued with studies on lyceum in Kežmarok, Kraków and Wieliczka. Upon completing his studies he worked for two years as an educator in Bánréve, but when his father got sick he returned home and after his death became a Lutheran pastor in Chyžné. When he left to Germany to finish his education, he was supplied by Samo Chalupka. In years 1856 - 1860 he became education supervisor and on his behalf was established the first Slovak high school in Revúca.

== Career ==
Tomášik belongs to the period between Kollár and Štúr generation. His first works were Latin poetry, but he was also interested in folklore. Besides Latin he wrote in Slovak and Czech. In his work can be often found challenge to fight for freedom or justice, endeavor to prove the importance of the Slovak nation in the history of the Kingdom of Hungary. He also attended to satyric, marital and folklore poetry. He places his writings on the region of Muráň and Gemer. His works are distinguished by musicality and folk language and many of them have become traditional. He died in Chyžné.

== List of his writings ==
- 1888 - Básně a písně, collective writing
- 1834 - Hej, Slováci (originally Na Slovany), hymnic song and former anthem of SFR Yugoslavia (later Serbia and Montenegro) and the Slovak Republic during WW2
- 1846 - Hladomra, the first prose (legend)
- 1864 - Bašovci na Muránskom zámku, tale
- 1865 - Sečovci, veľmoži gemerskí, tale
- 1867 - Vešelínovo dobytie Muráňa, tale
- 1870 - Odboj Vešelínov, tale
- 1873 - Malkotenti, tale
- 1876 - Kuruci, tale
- 1872 - Pamäti gemersko-malohontské, factual writing about the Gemer history
- 1883 - Denkwürdigkeiten des Muranyer Schlosses, mit Bezug auf die Vaterländische Geschichte, factual history of the Muráň Castle
- Barón Trenck, leader of the pandoors, unfinished novel (only manuscript)
- Svadba pod Kohoutem, drama (only manuscript)
- Kolo Tatier čierňava, revolutionary song
- Hej, pod Kriváňom (originally Hej, pod Muráňom), nationalized song
- Ja som bača veľmi starý
