= List of Montenegrin folk songs =

Following is the list of Montenegrin folk songs.

- Aj kad prošetah šefteli sokakom
- Cetinje ponos grade
- Crna Goro zemljo moja
- Crnogorac sa planine
- Djetelina do koljena
- Donji kraj
- Eh, da mi je, da me želja mine
- Ja sam Crnogorac
- Još ne sviće rujna zora
- Katunski Oro
- Kom planina
- Kotorskim ulicama
- Kralj Nikola na umoru
- Na Svetoga Nikolu
- Niđe nebo nije plavo kao iznad Crne Gore
- Oj Đevojko
- Oj đevojko Milijana
- Oj vesela veselice
- Oj, svijetla majska zoro
- Pjevaj Maro
- Pod Lovćenom
- Poljem se vija
- Razbolje se zorna Zorka
- Sestra mi se udaje
- Svat do svata kum do kuma
- Svi pljevaljski tamburaši
- Šetajući pored Ljubovića
- Tamo đe se gusle čuju
- Volim te Crna Goro

== See also ==
- Music of Montenegro
