= Chyzne =

Chyzne may refer to:

- Chyżne, Poland
- Chyžné, Slovakia
