= Dijak (surname) =

Dijak is a surname. Notable people with the surname include:

- Christopher Dijak (born 1987), American professional wrestler
- Franjo Dijak (born 1977), Croatian actor
- Vlado Dijak (1925–1988), Yugoslavian partisan
