= Bijelo Dugme (album) =

Studio album by Bijelo Dugme
- Released: 12 December 1984
- Recorded: 1984
- Studios: RTV Sarajevo Studio I, Sarajevo; RTV Zagreb Studio IV, Zagreb; RTV Skopje Studio, Skopje; Studio Akvarijus, Belgrade
- Genres: Rock; pop rock; folk rock
- Length: 39:07
- Label: Diskoton / Kamarad
- Producer: Goran Bregović

Bijelo Dugme chronology
Sanjao sam noćas da te nemam (Velike rock balade) (1984)	Bijelo Dugme (1984)	Pljuni i zapjevaj moja Jugoslavijo (1986)

Bijelo Dugme (transl. "White Button"), commonly known as Kosovka djevojka, (Note: Due to Bijelo Dugme's usage of Uroš Predić's famous painting Kosovo Maiden for the album cover, the album is unofficially known as such (translation: Kosovo Maiden).) is the untitled seventh studio album by the Yugoslav rock band Bijelo Dugme, released in 1984.

Bijelo Dugme is the band's only album recorded with vocalist Mladen Vojičić "Tifa", who came to the band as the replacement for Željko Bebek. The album is also notable for featuring the band's former member Laza Ristovski on keyboards, who, after the album was released, became an official member of the band once again.

Bijelo Dugme was listed in 1998 as the 28th on the list of 100 Greatest Yugoslav Rock and Pop Albums in the book YU 100: najbolji albumi jugoslovenske rok i pop muzike (YU 100: The Best Albums of Yugoslav Pop and Rock Music).

== Background and recording ==
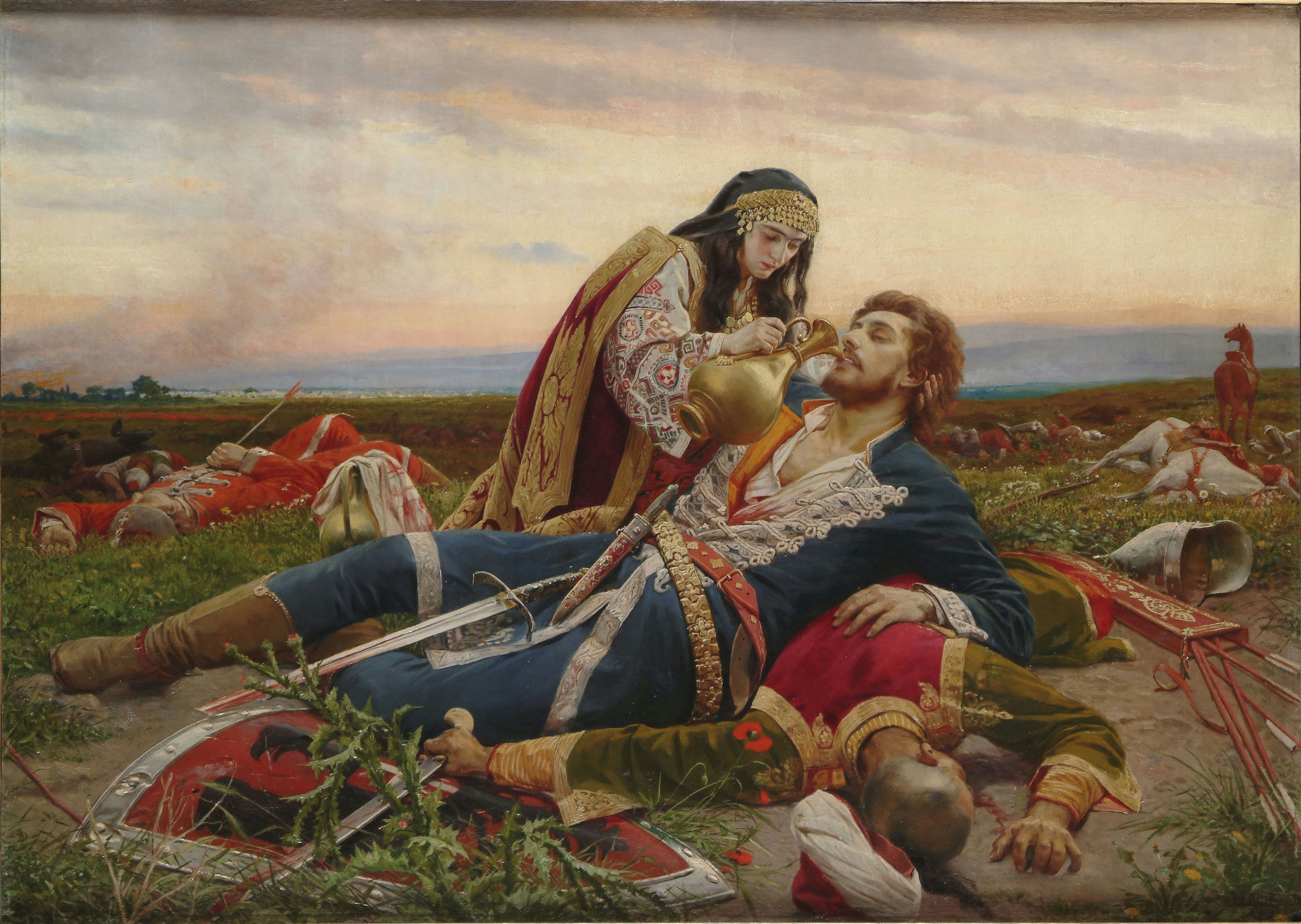
Kosovo Maiden, a 1919 painting by Uroš Predić is utilized on the album cover.

Following protracted disagreements over revenue sharing, Bijelo Dugme vocalist Željko Bebek left the band in April 1984, deciding to focus on his solo career. The band's new singer became a former Top and Teška Industrija member Mladen Vojičić Tifa. The band spent the summer of 1984 in Rovinj, where they held small performances in Monvi tourist centre, preparing for the upcoming studio album recording sessions.

The album was recorded in Sarajevo, Skopje, Zagreb, and Belgrade. The working title of the album, Još uvijek nas ima (We're Still Here), was discarded after it was decided that Uroš Predić's painting would appear on the cover. Bijelo Dugme featured Radio Television of Skopje Folk Instruments Orchestra, folk group Ladarice on backing vocals, Pece Atanasovski on gaida and Sonja Beran-Leskovšek on harp. The song "Pediculis pubis" (misspelling of "Pediculosis pubis") featured Bora Đorđević, the leader of Bijelo Dugme's main competitors at the time, Riblja Čorba, on vocals. Đorđević co-wrote the song with Bijelo Dugme leader Goran Bregović, and sung it with Bregović and Vojičić. (Bregović would, in return, make a guest appearance on Riblja Čorba 1985 album Istina, singing with Đorđević in the song "Disko mišić" ("Disco Muscle"). Đorđević had an idea of political song, with lyrics mentioning names and nicknames of Yugoslav politicians, but Bregović persuaded him that the song should feature joking lyrics about pubic lice. The final mix of the album was done by German producer Theo Werdin, who initially came to Sarajevo to produce Divlje Jagode's album Vatra (Fire), but whom Diskoton, after his arrival, hired to work on Bijelo Dugme.

The album featured a version of Yugoslav national anthem, "Hej, Slaveni", as the opening track. The song "Lipe cvatu, sve je isto k'o i lani" ("Linden Trees Are in Bloom, Everything's Just Like It Used to Be") is musically based on the song "Šta ću nano dragi mi je ljut" ("What Can I Do, Mom, My Darling Is Angry"), written by Bregović and originally recorded by Bisera Veletanlić.

The album was co-released by state-owned record label Diskoton and Kamarad, the label Goran Bregović formed with singer Zdravko Čolić.

== Track listing ==
No.	Title	Lyrics	Music	Length
1.	"Hej, Slaveni" ("Hey, Slavs")	Samo Tomášik (Serbo-Croatian translation by Dragutin Rakovac)	Unknown composer	1:30
2.	"Padaju zvijezde" ("The Stars Are Falling")	Goran Bregović	Goran Bregović	4:40
3.	"Meni se ne spava" ("I Don't Feel like Sleeping")	Goran Bregović; Miljenko Žuborski	Goran Bregović	4:15
4.	"Za Esmu" ("For Esma")	Goran Bregović	Goran Bregović	4:15
5.	"Jer, kad ostariš" ("Because, When You Grow Old")	Goran Bregović	Goran Bregović	3:40
6.	"Lipe cvatu, sve je isto k'o i lani" ("Linden Trees Are in Bloom, Everything's just like It Used to Be")	Goran Bregović	Goran Bregović	4:00
7.	"Pediculis pubis" (misspelling of "Pediculosis pubis")	Bora Đorđević; Goran Bregović	Goran Bregović	4:25
8.	"Aiaio Radi Radio" ("Aiaio the Radio Is On")	Goran Bregović	Goran Bregović	2:53
9.	"Lažeš" ("You're Lying")	Goran Bregović	Goran Bregović	3:47
10.	"Da te bogdo ne volim" ("If I Could Only Not Love You")	Goran Bregović	Goran Bregović	5:18

== Personnel ==
- Goran Bregović - guitar, producer (track 1)
- Mladen Vojičić - vocals
- Zoran Redžić - bass guitar
- Ipe Ivandić - drums
- Vlado Pravdić - keyboard

=== Additional personnel ===
- Bora Đorđević - vocals (track 7)
- Ladarice - backing vocals
- Laza Ristovski - keyboards, computer programming (PPG WAVE 2.3 / PPG WAVETERM B computer)
- Pece Atanasovski - gaida (track 6)
- Sonja Beran-Leskovšek - harp (track 10)
- Radio Television of Skopje Folk Instruments Orchestra (track 6)
- Mufid Kosović - engineer
- Mladen Škalec - recorded by (Ladarice)
- Milka Gerasimova - recorded by (track 6)
- Ratko Ostojić - recorded by (track 3)
- Theo Werdin - mixing

== Reception and events following the release ==
The album was well received by the audience. "Lipe cvatu, sve je isto k'o i lani" was the album's biggest hit. Other hits included "Padaju zvijezde", "Lažeš", "Da te bogdo ne volim" and "Jer kad ostariš". Part of the music critics praised Ristovski's usage of computers and digital synthesizers, with the band leader Goran Bregović claiming that the use of such instruments increased their musical sphere; this culminated in the success of the album. Ristovski was known for reusing his equipment on Pljuni i zapjevaj moja Jugoslavijo. Many critics, however, disliked the album.

The album sold more than 420,000 copies. The promotional tour was also very successful. The band held a successful concert at Belgrade Fair in front of some 27,000 people (which was, up to that point, the biggest number of spectators on an indoor concert in Belgrade), but also performed in clubs on several occasions. The stylized army uniform in which the members of the band appeared on stage and the large red star from Kamarad logo were partially inspired by the works of Laibach.

After the promotional tour, Vojičić, under the pressure of professional obligations, sudden fame, and a media scandal caused by revelation of his LSD usage, decided to leave the band. He performed with Bijelo Dugme for the last time at three concerts in Moscow held at the end of July and beginning of August 1985.

== Influence and legacy ==
From the band's position, it was the self-preservation album. [...] They were together on the recording of that album. They breathed as one, spent all of the time in the studio and followed Bregović's energy. They thought about every detail. That album is a collection of incredible details imbibed into an incredible unity. [...]

Generally speaking, it's a magical album, magical in its every moment, in every note, in every sung syllable. Or—as Đorđe Matić, the author of the best essays about Bijelo Dugme that were never written, would say—'something that is, all at the same time, like the Sex Pistols, like the Russian suprematists and the Italian futurists, and like, in the more extensive context, Yugoslavia itself — all of that could, now it is obvious, last for only a short, the shortest period of time, just like any supernova — the explosion of a star, by its nature, can't last for long.'

If the album Uspavanka za Radmilu M. was a hint of Bregović's own genre, the album Bijelo Dugme was the announcement of it. It represents the greatest artistic independence reached by the Yugoslav culture when it comes to popular music. And then, it's the album which doesn't resemble any other album, from anywhere else.

— Dušan Vesić in 2014

Suppose we view Laibach and Mizar as ideological avant-garde — the Marx and Engels of Yugoslav rock, and we further assign Riblja Čorba the role of the people, then Bijelo Dugme can be looked at as the Communist Party's local neighbourhood branch. Bijelo Dugme was a compound of Yugoslav reality with an image that had been created to show what things are supposed to be like, but without excessive illusions. Bijelo Dugme offered a mildly stylized, slightly removed state of things.

On their 1984 self-titled album, Bijelo Dugme recorded one of their biggest hits, 'Lipe cvatu', a song that's larger than life. The album opens with a cover of the Yugoslav anthem 'Hej, Slaveni', a decision that's a typical example of Titoist pseudo-dissidence. And they also brought us a clinical plagiarism of Van Halen in 'Padaju zvijezde'. All in all, if you needed an album to point out as the definition of this band's canon, here it is.

Of course, it is even more important to bear in mind that this album knocked the entire SFR Yugoslavia off its feet, that its hits became immortal, and that Bregović's had begun to write his book on making hit records around the time of this album. At that time, he allegedly stated he intentionally doesn't put much effort into mixing due to figuring his fans have bad stereo equipment anyway, while further assuming those who do own good equipment certainly wouldn't waste their time listening to Bijelo Dugme. Yet another one of his nuggets of wisdom when it comes to creating hit tracks was that he knew 'Lipe cvatu' would resonate with a mass audience because he statistically calculated the last time a song in that rhythm became a hit.

Anyhow, this record is a primer on how to make a commercial monster of Yugoslav rock, a record for weddings and funerals, for Yugoslav stereo equipment, for entertainment of the nations and nationalities, and how to create a bubble that can't be blown away.

— Dimitrije Vojnov in 2007

Bijelo Dugme's folk-oriented pop rock sound, alongside the idea of Yugoslavism, present on the album via cover of "Hej, Slaveni", influenced a great number of pop rock bands from Sarajevo, like Merlin, Plavi Orkestar, Crvena Jabuka, Valentino and Hari Mata Hari, some of whom would later be labeled as New Partisans.

The album polled in 1998 as the 28th on the list of 100 Greatest Yugoslav Rock and Pop Albums in the book YU 100: najbolji albumi jugoslovenske rok i pop muzike (YU 100: The Best Albums of Yugoslav Pop and Rock Music).

In 2000, "Lipe cvatu" and "Za Esmu" polled at 10th and 78th spot respectively on the Rock Express Top 100 Yugoslav Rock Songs of All Times list.

In 2007, Serbian critic Dimitrije Vojnov named Bijelo Dugme one of ten most important records in the history of Yugoslav rock, despite having a negative opinion of the album.

In 2015, Bijelo Dugme album cover was ranked the 1st on the list of 100 Greatest Album Covers of Yugoslav Rock published by web magazine Balkanrock.

In June 2016, Radio Split of the Croatian Radiotelevision came under scrutiny of numerous music critics and a part of general public for performing censorship on the Lipe cvatu song's verse that mentions "Yugoslavia". It was described as "bizarre" and the result of "[nothing] but hiding one's own incompetence or powerlessness", and a reflection of the fear and weakness of the Croatian state-owned media to face their past. Croatian Composers' Society determined it to be a copyright violation that was punishable by law, which was also confirmed by a representative of author's rights in the publishing house Aquarius, stating that they would take legal action upon repeated offences. HRT and Radio Split did not respond to press inquiries regarding this incident.

== Covers ==
- Serbian and Yugoslav folk singer Zorica Brunclik recorded a cover of "Lipe cvatu, sve je isto k'o i lani" on her 1993 album Branili su našu ljubav (They Were against Our Love).
- Bosnian turbo folk singer Igor Vukojević recorded a cover of "Lažeš" on his 2003 album Ringišpil (Carousel).
- Serbian ensemble Ekrem Sajdić Trumpet Orchestra recorded an instrumental cover of "Lipe cvatu, sve je isto k'o i lani" on 2004 various artists album Kad jeknu dragačevske trube 2 (When the Trumpets of Dragačevo Start Playing 2).
- Serbian folk singer Saša Matić recorded a cover of "Lipe cvatu" on his 2010 cover album Nezaboravne... (Unforgettable Ones...).
