= Hey, Slavs =

Patriotic Slavic song

Hej, Slaveni Hej, Slované Hej, Sloveni Hej, Slovani Hej Slovenci Hej Slováci Ej Sloveni
English: Hey, Slavs
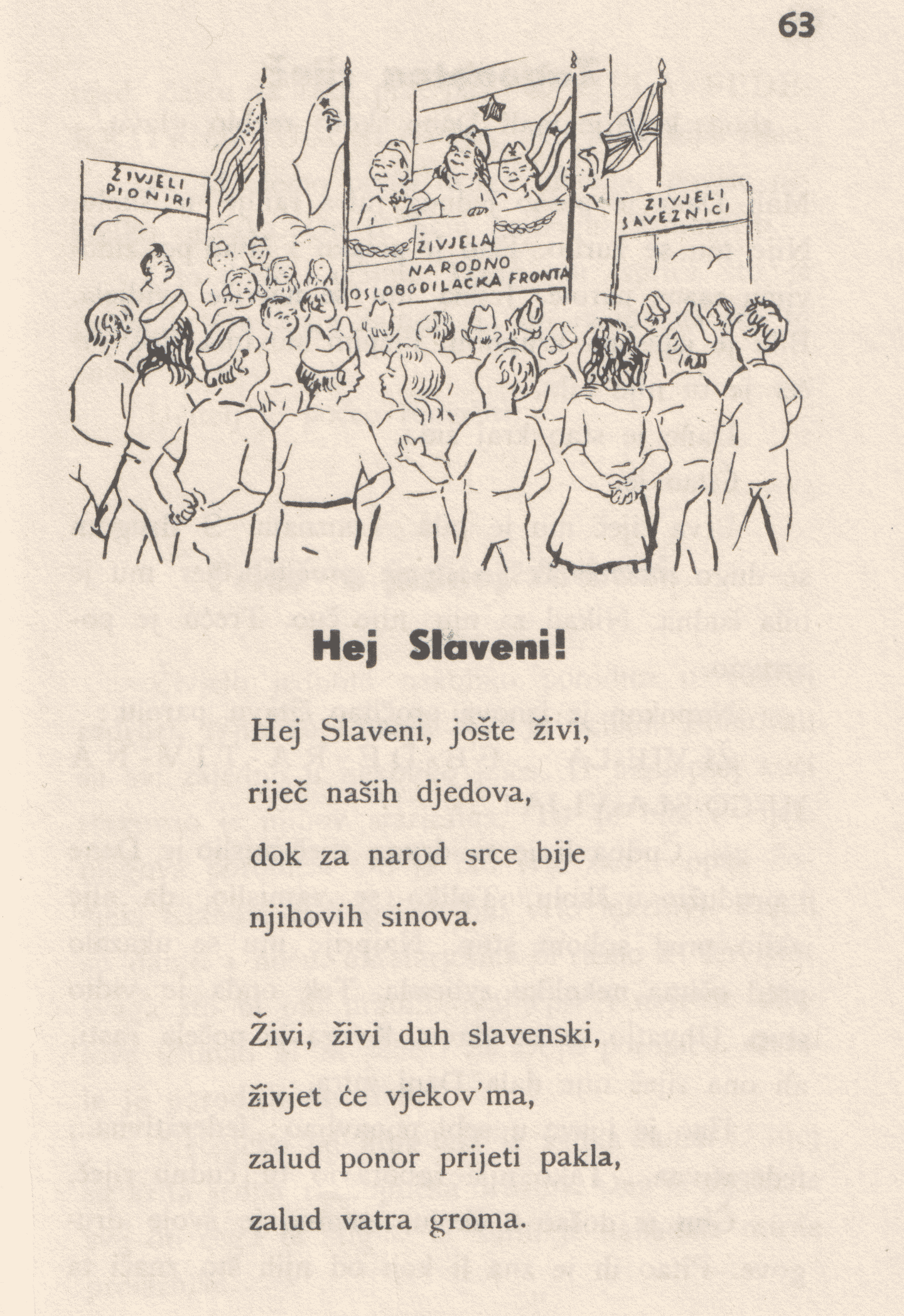
- A Serbo-Croatian language version print of the poem that would become the national anthem of Yugoslavia.
- Former national anthem of Yugoslavia; Serbia and Montenegro; Slovak State
- Also known as: "Hej, Słowianie"
- Lyrics: Samo Tomášik, 1834
- Music: Polish composer unknown, 18th century (arranged by Oskar Danon)
- Adopted: 1939 (by Slovak State); 1945 (by Yugoslavia, de facto); 1977 (by Yugoslavia, de jure provisionally); 1988 (by Yugoslavia, de jure constitutionally); 1992 (by Serbia and Montenegro)
- Relinquished: 1945 (by Slovak State); 1992 (by Yugoslavia); 2006 (by Serbia and Montenegro)

Audio sample
- "Hey, Slavs" (instrumental, both verses): file; help

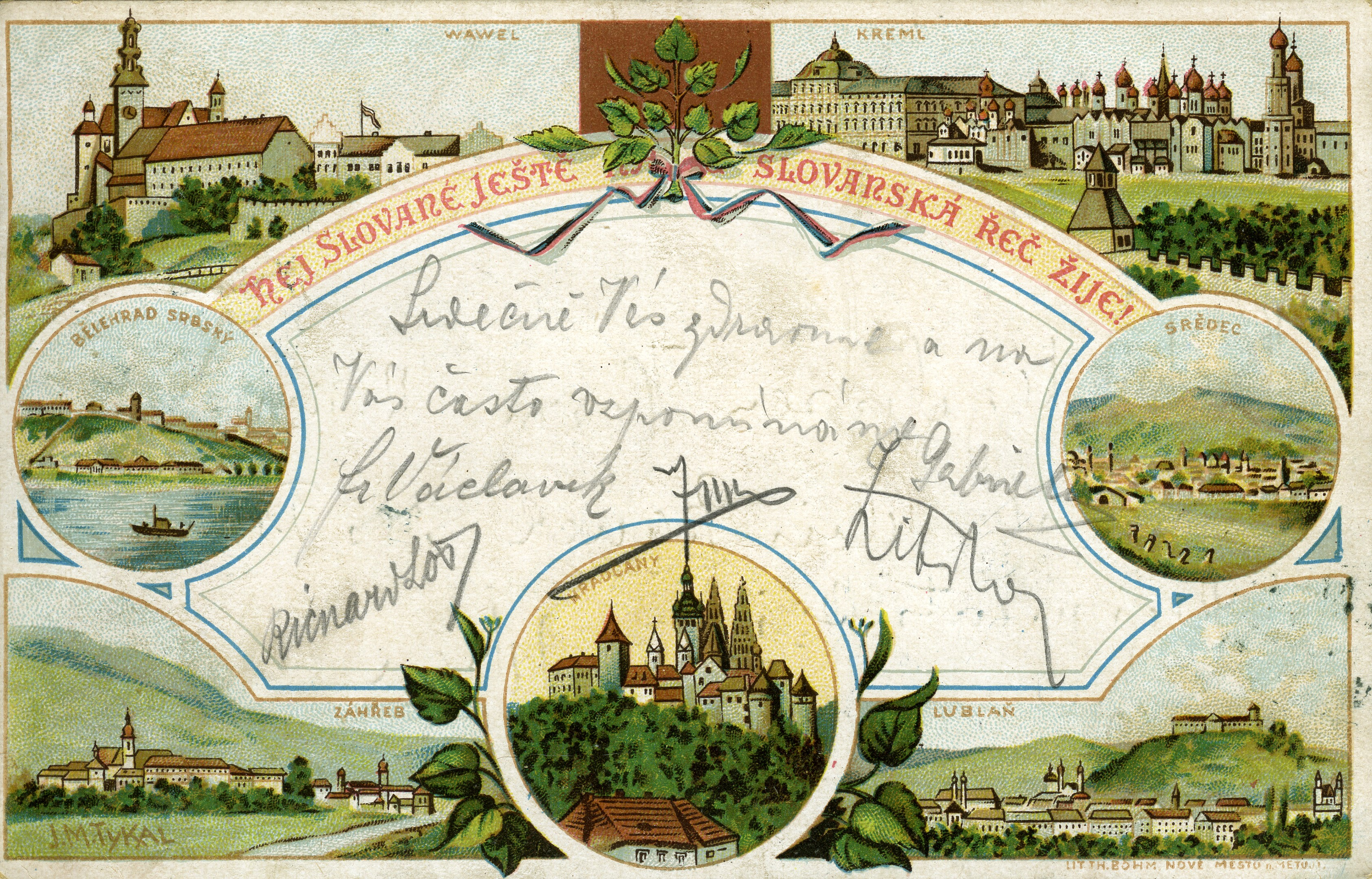
1899 postcard with the first line in Czech (Hej Slované ještě naše slovanská řeč žije!) and views of several Slav cities

"Hey, Slavs" is a patriotic song dedicated to the Slavs and widely considered to be the Pan-Slavic anthem. It was adapted and adopted as the national anthem of various Slavic-speaking nations, movements and organizations during the late 19th and 20th century.

Its lyrics were first written in 1834 under the title "Hey, Slovaks" ("Hej, Slováci") by Samo Tomášik in Prague and it has since served as the anthem of the Pan-Slavic movement, the organizational anthem of the Sokol movement, and the national anthems of the First Slovak Republic, SFR Yugoslavia, and Serbia and Montenegro. It was composed to the tune of "Mazurek Dąbrowskiego" from 1797, which was adopted as the national anthem of Poland through a process spanning from 1926 to 1927. The Yugoslav variation has a slower tempo, changed a few notes, is more accentuated, and does not repeat the last four lines as it repeats the last two lines. The composer is unknown, although modern renditions of the song often used a World War II-era arrangement by Oskar Danon.

== Etymology ==
In Serbo-Croatian, which uses both the Latin and the Cyrillic alphabets, the song had been titled as (in Croatian and in Serbian standard, respectively):

- Hej, Slaveni or Hej, Sloveni (in Latin)
- Хеј, Славени or Хеј, Словени (in Serbo-Croatian Cyrillic)

In Macedonian the song's title is "Ej, Sloveni" (Cyrillic: Еј, Словени), and in Slovene, it is "Hej, Slovani". The original title in Slovak was "Hej, Slováci".

== Slovakia ==
"Mazurek Dąbrowskiego"
The Polish national anthem "Mazurek Dąbrowskiego", to which "Hey, Slavs" bears aesthetic similarity.

"Hej, Slováci"
"Hej, Slováci", This song was played when Slovak state declared independence from Czechoslovakia .

The song was written initially in Czech by the Slovak Lutheran minister Samuel Tomášik while he was visiting Prague in 1834. He was appalled that German was more commonly heard in the streets of Prague than Czech. He wrote in his diary:

"If mother Prague, the pearl of the Western Slavic world, is to be lost in a German sea, what awaits my dear homeland, Slovakia, which looks to Prague for spiritual nourishment? Burdened by that thought, I remembered the old Polish song Jeszcze Polska nie zginęła, kiedy my żyjemy ("Poland has not yet perished as long as we live."). That familiar melody caused my heart to erupt with a defiant Hej, Slováci, ešte naša slovenská reč žije ("Hey, Slovaks, our Slovak language still lives")... I ran to my room, lit a candle and wrote down three verses into my diary in pencil. The song was finished in a moment." (Diary of Samuel Tomášik, Sunday, 2 November 1834)

Tomášik left the instructions for his song to be performed to the melody of Dąbrowski's Mazurka: "It be sung as: Poland has not yet perished".

The Pan-Slavic flag from the 1848 Prague Slavic Congress, which was also the Yugoslav national flag from 1918 to 1941 and from 1992 to 2006.

He soon altered the lyrics to include all Slavs and "Hey, Slavs" became a widely known rallying song for Slav nationalism and Pan-Slavic sentiment, especially in the West Slavic lands governed by Austria. It was printed in numerous magazines and calendars and sung at political gatherings, becoming an unofficial anthem of the Pan-Slavic movement.

Its popularity continued to increase when it was adopted as the organizational anthem of the Sokol ("falcon") physical education movement, which was based on Pan-Slavic ideals and active across Austria-Hungary. In 1905, the erection of a monument to the Slovene poet France Prešeren in Ljubljana was celebrated by a large gathering of people singing "Hey, Slavs". During the First World War, the song was often used by Slavic soldiers from opposite sides of the front line to communicate common nationalist sentiment and prevent bloodshed.

In Slovakia, the song "Hey, Slovaks" has been considered the unofficial ethnic anthem of the Slovaks throughout its modern history, especially at times of revolution. Although after the First World War the song "Nad Tatrou sa blýska" became the official Slovak part in the national anthem of Czechoslovakia and then again in 1993 in anthem of independent Slovakia, "Hey, Slovaks" is still considered a "second" national anthem by many (usually more nationalistic) people. In the clerofascist Slovak Republic (1939–45), "Hej, Slováci" was made the state anthem.

Slovak variant

Hej, Slováci, ešte naša
slovenská reč žije,
Dokiaľ naše verné srdce
za náš národ bije.
Žije, žije, duch slovenský,
bude žiť naveky,
𝄆 Hrom a peklo, márne vaše
proti nám sú vzteky! 𝄇

Jazyka dar zveril nám Boh,
Boh náš hromovládny,
Nesmie nám ho teda vyrvať
na tom svete žiadny;
I nechže je koľko ľudí,
toľko čertov v svete;
𝄆 Boh je s nami: kto proti nám,
toho Parom zmetie. 𝄇

A nechže sa i nad nami
hrozná búrka vznesie,
Skala puká, dub sa láme
a zem nech sa trasie;
My stojíme stále pevne,
ako múry hradné.
𝄆 Čierna zem pohltí toho,
kto odstúpi zradne! 𝄇

English translation

Hey, Slovaks, our Slovak tongue still lives,
As long as our loyal heart is beating for our nation!
Therein lives, lives, lives the Slovak spirit,
it will live for ages!
Thunder and Hell, in vain are
your rages against us!

God entrusted to us our language
our thunderwielding god.
Therefore, it must not be ripped from us,
by anyone in the world!
Let there be as many devils,
as there are people in the world...
God is with us: whoever stands against us,
will by Perun be swept off!

Even if a tremendous storm
rises above us,
The stone may crack, the oak may break,
and the earth may quake...
We will stand always firm
like the castle walls.
To pits of the black earth be damned
whom betrays treacherously!

== Yugoslavia ==
"Hey, Slavs" played by a music box.

The first appearance of "Hey, Slavs" in Yugoslavia was during the Illyrian movement. Dragutin Rakovac translated the song, naming it "Hey, Illyrians" (Croatian: Hej, Iliri). Until the Second World War, the translation did not undergo many changes, except that the Illyrians became Slavs.

In 1941 the Second World War engulfed the Kingdom of Yugoslavia. The Axis powers invaded in early April, and the Yugoslav royal army disintegrated and capitulated in just two and a half weeks. Since the old Yugoslav anthem included references to king and kingdom, the anti-royalist Partisan resistance led by Josip Broz Tito and his Communist party decided to avoid it and opted for "Hey, Slavs" instead. The song was sung at both the first and second sessions of AVNOJ, the legislative body of the resistance, and it gradually became the de facto national anthem of Democratic Federal Yugoslavia (new Yugoslavia).

Hey Slavs played in 1940s

The old state anthem was officially abandoned after liberation in 1945, but no new national anthem to replace it was officially adopted. There were several attempts to promote other, more specifically Yugoslav songs as the national anthem, but none gained much public support and "Hey, Slavs" continued to be used unofficially. The search for a better candidate continued up to 1988, while in 1977 the law only named the national anthem as "Hey, Slavs" as a temporary state anthem until a new one was adopted, which never happened.

"Hey, Slavs" under its Serbo-Croatian title "Hej, Slaveni" was therefore the national anthem of Yugoslavia for a total of 48 years, from 1943 to 1992. With the formal adoption (inauguration) of Amendment IX to the Constitution of the Socialist Federal Republic of Yugoslavia, the song "Hey, Slavs" gained constitutional sanction as the national anthem on November 25, 1988. After 43 years of continued use as the de facto national anthem, the delegates simply brought the law in line with custom.

Serbo-Croatian (Latin/Cyrillic)		English translation	Slovene
Hej Slaveni, jošte živi R[ij]eč (duh) naših d[j]edova Dok za narod srce bije Njihovih sinova Živi, živi duh slavenski Živjet će v[j]ekov'ma 𝄆 Zalud pr[ij]eti ponor pakla Zalud vatra groma 𝄇 Nek se sada i nad nama Burom sve raznese St[j]ena puca, dub se lama Zemlja nek se trese Mi stojimo postojano Kano klisurine 𝄆 Proklet bio izdajica Svoje domovine! 𝄇	Хеј Словени, јоште живи Р[иј]еч (дух) наших д[ј]едова Док за народ срце бије Њихових синова Живи, живи дух словенски Живеће в[ј]еков'ма 𝄆 Залуд пр[иј]ети понор пакла, Залуд ватра грома 𝄇 Нек' се сада и над нама Буром све разнесе Ст[ј]ена пуца, дуб се лама, Земља нек' се тресе Ми стојимо постојано Кано клисурине, 𝄆 Проклет био издајица Своје домовине! 𝄇	Hey, Slavs, there still lives the word (spirit) of our grandfathers While for the nation beats the heart of its sons! There lives, there lives the Slavic spirit, It will live for ages! 𝄆 In vain threatens the abyss of Hell; In vain the fire of thunder! 𝄇 Let now everything above us be blown away by the bora. The stone cracks, the oak breaks, Let the earth quake! We stand firm like the big cliffs, 𝄆 May he be damned, the traitor of his homeland! 𝄇	Hej Slovani, naša reč slovanska živo klije dokler naše verno srce za naš narod bije Živi, živi, duh slovanski, bodi živ na veke, 𝄆 grom in peklo, prazne vaše proti nam so steke 𝄇 Naj tedaj nad nami strašna burja se le znese, skala poka, dob se lomi, zemlja naj se strese Bratje, mi stojimo trdno kakor zidi grada, 𝄆 črna zemlja naj pogrezne tega, kdor odpada! 𝄇
Macedonian (Cyrillic/transliteration)		English translation	
Еј, Словени, жив е тука зборот свет на родот штом за народ срце чука преку син во внукот! Жив е вечно, жив е духот словенски во слога. 𝄆 Не нѐ плашат адски бездни ниту громов оган! 𝄇 Пустошејќи, нека бура и над нас се втурне! Пука даб и карпа сура, тлото ќе се урне: Стоиме на стамен-прагот: клисури и бедем!; 𝄆 Проклет да е тој што предал Родина на врагот! 𝄇	Ej, Sloveni, živ e tuka zborot svet na rodot štom za narod srce čuka preku sin vo vnukot! Živ e večno, živ e duhot slovenski vo sloga. 𝄆 Ne nè plašat adski bezdni nitu gromov ogan! 𝄇 Pustošejḱi, neka bura i nad nas se vturne! Puka dab i karpa sura, tloto ḱe se urne: Stoime na stamen-pragot: klisuri i bedem!; 𝄆 Proklet da e toj što predal Rodina na vragot! 𝄇	Hey, Slavs, herein lives on the sacred word of our lineage as long as the heart beats for our nation from son to grandson! The Slavic spirit lives on forever in unity. 𝄆 Infernal abysses do not frighten us, nor the blazes of thunder. 𝄇 May a bora devastate and rage above us! Oak trees and ashen rocks will crack, the earth will cave in: For we stand at the doorstep of gorges and bulwarks! 𝄆 Cursed is he who betrays his homeland to the enemy! 𝄇	

== Serbia and Montenegro ==
After the break-up of Yugoslavia in 1991 and 1992, when only Serbia and Montenegro remained in the federation, "Hey, Slavs" continued to be used, as the national anthem of the Federal Republic of Yugoslavia (FRY). Slobodan Milošević wanted to adopt “Hey, Slavs” as the Serbian anthem, but the Main Board of the Socialist Party of Serbia overruled it, feeling that it was inappropriate to reuse it after having assigned it to Yugoslavia, thus they assigned Serbia “March on the Drina” instead. The FRY was renamed to the State Union of Serbia and Montenegro in 2003 and was expected to adopt a new national anthem, but since no agreement over state symbols could be reached, "Hey, Slavs" remained the national anthem of the state. Many Serbs disliked the song during this period and booed it whenever it was played, such as at sporting events and football games.

A hybrid of the Montenegrin folk song (now national anthem) "Oj, svijetla majska zoro" with the former (now current) Serbian national anthem, "Bože Pravde" in alternating verses was proposed (similarly to Czechoslovakia, whose anthem consisted of the Czech part "Kde domov můj" and the Slovak part "Nad Tatrou sa blýska"). However, this attempt was struck down after objections by the People's Party of Montenegro and the Socialist People's Party of Montenegro. Also proposed was the former Montenegrin national anthem and patriotic song "Onamo, 'namo", however this also fell through and "Hey, Slavs" remained the national anthem. Since Montenegro and Serbia dissolved their union and split to become sovereign states in 2006, this issue is moot, as "Hey, Slavs" is no longer used as an official national anthem by any sovereign state. In a way, "Hey, Slavs" ended up outliving the countries that used it, as the last instance of it being officially played as part of an event was at the 2006 FIFA World Cup, where the Serbia and Montenegro national football team participated despite the country they were playing for no longer existing (having disbanded a few days before the tournament began).

Even after the end of the federation, "Hey, Slavs" was sometimes still mistakenly played by organizers of sports events that involve Serbian teams as a guest side. Notable performances, some of which were intentional, include the 2013 UEFA U-19 Championship semi-final football match between Serbia and Portugal as well as the Olympiacos–Partizan ULEB Champions league basketball game in 2010. In 2015, French organizers of 2015 European Touring Car Cup season erroneously played "Hey, Slavs" when Serbian racing driver Dušan Borković won 1st place at Circuit Paul Ricard.

== In popular culture ==
The Yugoslav band Bijelo Dugme recorded a version of the song for their 1984 self-titled album. The Yugoslav and Slovenian band Laibach recorded an electronic version of the song, with lyrics in both English and Slovene, for their 2006 album Volk. The song also appears in the 2002 Slovenian film Headnoise.
