= Uspavanka za Radmilu M. =

Studio album by Bijelo Dugme
- Released: 21 February 1983
- Recorded: 1982
- Studios: RTV Skopje Studio, Skopje
- Genres: Rock; hard rock
- Length: 32:33
- Label: Jugoton
- Producers: Gajo Vučićević; Goran Bregović

Bijelo Dugme chronology
| ...a milicija trenira strogoću! (i druge pjesmice za djecu) (1983) | Uspavanka za Radmilu M. (1983) | Sanjao sam noćas da te nemam (Velike rock balade) (1984) |

Uspavanka za Radmilu M. (transl. "Lullaby for Radmila M.") is the sixth studio album by the Yugoslav rock band Bijelo Dugme, released in 1983.

Uspavanka za Radmilu M. was Bijelo Dugme's last studio album recorded with vocalist Željko Bebek. It is the band's first album since the 1977 live album Koncert kod Hajdučke česme (The Concert at Hajdučka česma) to feature drummer Ipe Ivandić and the first and only one since the 1975 album Šta bi dao da si na mom mjestu to be recorded in the band's default lineup.

== Background and recording ==
When we were making the record, we approached it as our final album, because everything pointed to it: Ipe returned to the band, the cover was designed by [Dragan S.] Stefanović [the band's old collaborator], the 'human factor' made a full circle, moving forward would have only meant doing it all over again from the beginning. I thought we should make that Belgrade Fair concert the last ever Bijelo Dugme show. Raka [Marić, the band's manager] cried, we brought all our friends from Sarajevo to make ourselves feel at home... It was a very strange concert, and, in all that euphoria, we thought that it would be a shame if we split up.

— Goran Bregović

The band's leader, guitarist Goran Bregović, originally intended to release Uspavanka za Radmilu M. as Bijelo Dugme's farewell album and to dismiss the band after the promotional tour. Unlike the band's previous albums, Uspavanka za Radmilu M. was not followed by a large promotion in the media.

The album was recorded in Skopje. Uspavanka za Radmilu M. was the band's first album since the 1977 live album Koncert kod Hajdučke česme to feature drummer Ipe Ivandić, who returned to the band at the end of 1982, replacing Garabet Tavitjan, who performed with the band only on the 1982 Bulgarian tour. The album was produced by Bregović and Gajo Vučićević and featured Leb i Sol member Vlatko Stefanovski (guitar), Blagoje Morotov (double bass) and Arsen Ereš (saxophone) as guest musicians. It was mixed in Britannia Row Studios in London. The songs "Ako možeš zaboravi" ("Forget, If You Can"), "U vrijeme otkazanih letova" ("In the Time of Canceled Flights"), "Polubauk polukruži poluevropom" ("Half-Spectre Is Half-Haunting Half-Europe", the title referring to the first sentence of The Communist Manifesto) and "Ovaj ples dame biraju" ("Ladies' Choice") featured diverse sound, illustrating various phases in the band's career. The title track, which closes the album, is the only instrumental track Bijelo Dugme ever recorded.

At that point, to sing a song in Albanian was, above all, a perfect political provocation. It was the period after the state of emergency in Kosovo, after the events that had left a bitter taste in everyone's mouth. After those events, in everyone's thoughts about Kosovo there was no need to break down the walls, but to keep strengthening them, and in 1983 everything seemed even harder than two years earlier – only the state of emergency had ended. Maybe the ones who claim that, at that point, it was already too late for the things in Kosovo to change are right, but that Don Quixotesque attempt by Bijelo Dugme remains a notable moment. As Bregović explained: 'I thought that, after all those years living with Albanians, we should have learnt some Albanian words.'

— Dušan Vesić in 2014

The song "Kosovska" ("Kosovo Song") featured Albanian language lyrics. Written during delicate political situation in Socialist Autonomous Province of Kosovo, the song represented Bregović's effort to integrate the culture of Kosovo Albanians into Yugoslav rock music. Although lyrics were simple, dealing with rock music, the song caused certain controversies. Reminiscing on the song, Željko Bebek in 2017 described it as a "revolutionary move" and praised its "beautiful lyrics", but also said he was very reluctant to sing it because he felt that Bijelo Dugme was starting to take an overt political stance, something he was not comfortable with. In his view, the song introduced discord within Bijelo Dugme, which ultimately led to his departure from the band.

== Album cover ==
The album cover was designed by Bijelo Dugme's old collaborator Dragan S. Stefanović. It featured an embossed print of a pillow on front and back cover.

== Track listing ==
All songs written by Goran Bregović, except where noted.

| No. | Title | Lyrics | Music | Length |
|---|---|---|---|---|
| 1. | "Polubauk polukruži poluevropom" ("Half-Spectre is Half-Haunting Half-Europe") | | | 3:57 |
| 2. | "Drugovi i drugarice" ("Comrades and Comradettes") | | | 3:33 |
| 3. | "Kosovska" ("Kosovo Song") | Zija Berisha, Agron Berisha, Shpend Ahmeti | G. Bregović | 3:34 |
| 4. | "U vrijeme otkazanih letova" ("In the Time of Canceled Flights") | | | 3:40 |
| 5. | "Zašto me ne podnosi tvoj tata" ("Why Can't Your Dad Stand Me") | | | 3:21 |
| 6. | "Ako možeš, zaboravi" ("Forget, If You Can") | | | 4:58 |
| 7. | "Ovaj ples dame biraju" ("Ladies' Choice") | | | 5:11 |
| 8. | "Ne plači" ("Don't Cry") | | | 3:54 |
| 9. | "Uspavanka za Radmilu M." ("Lullaby for Radmila M.") | | | 2:25 |

== Personnel ==
- Goran Bregović – guitar, producer
- Željko Bebek – vocals
- Zoran Redžić – bass guitar
- Ipe Ivandić – drums
- Vlado Pravdić – keyboards

=== Additional personnel ===
- Vlatko Stefanovski – guitar (on tracks: 1, 9)
- Blagoje Morotov – double bass
- Arsen Ereš – saxophone
- Gajo Vučević – producer
- Mike Johnson – engineer, mixed by
- Dragan S. Stefanović – design

== Reception ==
Upon its release, the album received mostly negative reactions by the critics. Džuboks critic Ljubo Trifunović wrote:

Uspavanka za Radmilu M. is, without any doubt, the worst Bijelo Dugme album to date, objectively speaking. It indicates the forthcoming end of the first superstars of Yugoslav rock, revealing fatigue, negligence, and diminishing inventiveness of Bregović & Co.

Another Džuboks critic, Branko Vukojević, wrote: "It seems like Bijelo Dugme wanted to return, but had nothing to return to."

Despite negative reaction from the critics, the tour was very successful, and the audience's response made Bregović change his mind about dismissing the band.

== Video album ==
The release of the Uspavanka za Radmilu M. album was followed by the release of an eponymous VHS cassette featuring videos for all the album tracks. The cassette also included some recordings from the concerts from the beginning of the Uspavanka za Radmilu M. tour. The cassette was the first project of the kind in the history of Yugoslav rock music. The videos were directed by Boris Miljković and Branimir "Tucko" Dimitrijević. The video for the song "Ovaj ples dame biraju" was the first gay-themed video in Yugoslavia.

== Legacy ==
It seems that not all of us managed to see — or managed to see clearly — Bijelo Dugme's moving forward. We were frantically digging in the past, and found some sort of synthesis of the first album's spontaneity, the second album's sentimentality, the third album's force, and the fourth album's big words. The way remained the same, but the methods changed. It wasn't the same Bijelo Dugme. Up to that point, Bregović stood on the river bank, waiting to see what the water will bring, fishing and adapting, staying on the levee the whole time. Suddenly, you could feel that he bought a boat, and that soon he will dare to swim. He was getting more and more interested into rock as a media, and less and less for the limitations of its musical forms.

— Dušan Vesić in 2014

The song "Ako možeš, zaboravi" was polled in 2006 as the 51st on B92 Top 100 Yugoslav songs list.

The album's title track was used in 2006 mockumentary film Borat, but did not appear on the official soundtrack album.

== Covers ==
- Yugoslav singer-songwriter and former Azra leader Branimir "Džoni" Štulić released a cover of "Ako možeš, zaboravi" on his official YouTube channel in 2011.
- Croatian pop singer Natali Dizdar covered the song "Ovaj ples dame biraju" on her 2012 live album ZKM Live.
- Serbian surf rock band Moussaka released a cover of "Ako možeš, zaboravi" on their 2014 EP Moussaka EP.
