= Singl ploče (1974–1975) =

Compilation album by Bijelo Dugme
- Released: 1982
- Genres: Rock; hard rock; folk rock
- Length: 49:55
- Label: Jugoton
- Producer: Various

Bijelo Dugme chronology
5. april '81; (1981)	Singl ploče (1974–1975) (1982)	Singl ploče (1976–1980) (1982)

Singl ploče (1974–1975) (transl. "7-inch singles (1974–1975)") is a compilation album by Yugoslav rock band Bijelo Dugme, released in 1982.

== Background ==
In early 1982, Bijelo Dugme performed in Innsbruck, Austria, at a manifestation conceptualized as a symbolic passing of the torch whereby the Winter Olympic Games last host city (Innsbruck) makes a handover to the next one (Bijelo Dugme's homecity Sarajevo). On their return to Yugoslavia, the band's equipment was seized by the customs, as it was discovered that they had put new equipment into old boxes. The band's record label, Jugoton decided to lend 150,000,000 Yugoslav dinars to Bijelo Dugme, in order to pay the fine. In order to regain part of the money as soon as possible, Jugoton decided to release two compilation albums, Singl ploče (1974–1975) and Singl ploče (1976–1980).

== Track listing ==
All songs were written by Goran Bregović, except where noted.

No.	Title	Lyrics	Music	Length
1.	"Top" ("Cannon")			4:15
2.	"Ove ću noći naći blues" ("Tonight, I Will Find Blues")	Goran Bregović	Goran Bregović, Ipe Ivandić, Ivan Vinković, Vlado Pravdić, Željko Bebek	4:20
3.	"Glavni junak jedne knjige" ("The Main Character of a Book")	Duško Trifunović	Goran Bregović	3:37
4.	"Bila mama Kukunka, bio tata Taranta" ("There Was a Mom Kukunka, There Was a Dad Taranta")	Žarko Roje	Žarko Roje	1:30
5.	"Da sam pekar" ("If I Was a Baker")	Goran Bregović	Vlado Pravdić	3:30
6.	"Selma"	Vlado Dijak	Goran Bregović	5:43
7.	"Da mi je znati koji joj je vrag" ("I Wonder What the Hell is Wrong With Her")			2:41
8.	"Blues za moju bivšu dragu" ("Blues For My Ex-Darling")			6:25
9.	"Ima neka tajna veza" ("There is Some Secret Relationship")	Duško Trifunović	Goran Bregović	3:30
10.	"I kad prođe sve, pjevat ću i tad" ("And When Everything Passes, I'll Still Sing")			4:40
11.	"Ne gledaj me tako i ne ljubi me više" ("Don't Look at Me Like That, and Kiss Me No More")			5:07
12.	"Sve ću da ti dam samo da zaigram" ("I'll Give You Everything Only to Dance")			4:07

== Credits ==
=== Bijelo Dugme ===
- Željko Bebek - vocals
- Goran Bregović - guitar
- Zoran Redžić - bass guitar (tracks: 3, 4, 5, 6, 7, 8, 9, 10, 11, 12)
- Jadranko Stanković - bass guitar (tracks: 1, 2)
- Ipe Ivandić - drums
- Vlado Pravdić - keyboards, arranged by (tracks: 4, 6)

=== Additional personnel ===
- Nikola Borota - producer (tracks: 1, 2, 5, 6)
- Vladimir Mihaljek - producer (tracks: 5, 6, 9, 10)
- Neil Harrison - producer (track 11)
- Antun Marković - engineer (tracks: 1, 2, 3, 4)
- Franjo Berner - engineer (tracks: 5, 6, 9, 10)
- Miro Bevc - engineer (tracks: 7, 8, 12)
- Peter Henderson - engineer (track 12)
- Siniša Škarica - compiled by
- Goran Trbuljak - artwork (design)
- Vladan Jovanović - artwork (drawing)
