= Oj, svijetla majska zoro =

National anthem of Montenegro

English: 'O Bright Dawn of May'
- Ој, свијетла мајска зоро
- National anthem of Montenegro
- Lyrics: Edited by Sekula Drljević, 19th century
- Music: Arranged by Žarko Mirković, 19th century
- Adopted: 12 July 2004 (official)

Audio sample
- U.S. Navy Band instrumental rendition in D minor: file; help

"Oj, svijetla majska zoro" (Montenegrin Cyrillic: Ој, свијетла мајска зоро, IPA: [ˈoj sʋjêːtʎa mâjska zǒro]; lit. 'O Bright Dawn of May') is the national anthem of Montenegro adopted in 2004. Before its adoption, it was a popular folk song with many variations of its text. The oldest version dates back to the second half of the 19th century.

== Lyrics ==
Many verses are repeated in order to follow the rhythmic composition.

Montenegrin

Latin

𝄆 Oj svijetla majska zoro. 𝄇
𝄆 Majko naša Crna Goro. 𝄇
𝄆 Sinovi smo tvog stijenja 𝄇
𝄆 I čuvari tvog poštenja 𝄇
Volimo vas, brda tvrda
I stravične vaše klance
Koji nikad ne poznaše
Sramotnoga ropstva lance.
𝄆 Majko naša Crna Goro! 𝄇

𝄆 Oj svijetla majska zoro. 𝄇
𝄆 Majko naša Crna Goro. 𝄇
Dok lovćenskoj našoj misli
Naša sloga daje krila,
Biće gorda, biće slavna
Domovina naša mila.
Rijeka će naših vala
Uskačući u dva mora
𝄆 Glas nositi okeanu,
Da je vječna Crna Gora. 𝄇
Da je vječna Crna Gora!

Cyrillic

𝄆 Ој свијетла мајска зоро. 𝄇
𝄆 Мајко наша Црна Горо. 𝄇
𝄆 Синови смо твог стијења 𝄇
𝄆 И чувари твог поштења 𝄇
Волимо вас, брда тврда
И стравичне ваше кланце
Који никад не познаше
Срамотнога ропства ланце,
𝄆 Мајко наша Црна Горо! 𝄇

𝄆 Ој свијетла мајска зоро. 𝄇
𝄆 Мајко наша Црна Горо. 𝄇
Док ловћенској нашој мисли
Наша слога даје крила,
Биће горда, биће славна
Домовина наша мила.
Ријека ће наших вала
Ускачући у два мора
𝄆 Глас носити океану,
Да је вјечна Црна Гора. 𝄇
Да је вјечна Црна Гора!

IPA

𝄆 [ˈoj sʋi.jêːt.la mâj.ska zǒ.ro] 𝄇
𝄆 [mâj.ko nâ.ʃa t͡sr̩̂ː.naː ɡǒ.ro] 𝄇
𝄆 [sîː.no.ʋî smɔ́ tʋôːk sti.jěː.ɲa] 𝄇
𝄆 [i t͡ʃǔ.ʋaː.ri tʋôːk ˈpɔʃ.tɛ.ɲa] 𝄇
[ʋǒ.li.mɔ́ ʋâːz ˈbr̩.da tʋr̂ː.da]
[i strǎː.ʋi.ˈt͡ʃɲě ˈva.ʃɛ kʋan.t͡sě]
[kǒ.jiː nî.kad ne ˈpɔz.na.ʃě]
[sra.mǒt.nɔ̀ː.ɡa rǒp.stʋa lǎːn.ʃě]
𝄆 [mâj.ko nâ.ʃa t͡sr̩̂ː.naː ɡǒ.ro] 𝄇

𝄆 [ˈoj sʋi.jêːt.la mâj.ska zǒ.ro] 𝄇
𝄆 [mâj.ko nâ.ʃa t͡sr̩̂ː.naː ɡǒ.ro] 𝄇
[dôk ˈlof t͡ɕên.skoj nâ.ʃoj ˈmis.li]
[nâ.ʃa slô.ɡa ˈda.je ˈkri.la]
[bǐː.t͡ɕe ɡôːr.da bǐː.t͡ɕe slâːʋ.na]
[dǒ.mo.ʋi.na nâ.ʃa mî.la]
[rjěːka t͡ɕe nâ.ʃîɣ ʋǎ.laː]
[ˈus.ka.ʃu.t͡ɕe ˈu dʋâː mǒː.ra]
𝄆 [ɡláːs nǒ.si.ti o.kě.aː.nu]
[ˈda je ʋjê.t͡ʃno t͡sr̩̂ː.naː ɡǒ.ra] 𝄇
[ˈda je ʋjê.t͡ʃno t͡sr̩̂ː.naː ɡǒ.ra ‖]

English translation
𝄆 O bright dawn of May blazes forth 𝄇
𝄆 Our mother Montenegro 𝄇
𝄆 We are the sons of your gravel 𝄇
𝄆 And guardians of your candour 𝄇
We love you, your craggy highlands
And your magnificent gorges
Which never came to experience
The chains of shameful slavery
𝄆 Our mother Montenegro 𝄇

𝄆 O bright dawn of May blazes forth 𝄇
𝄆 Our mother Montenegro 𝄇
For the cause of our Lovćen
Our unity gives us wings
All proud and lauded shall we be
Our dear homeland beloved
Estuary of our waves
That surges into the two seas
𝄆 Shall bear voice into the ocean
That Montenegro is ageless 𝄇
That Montenegro is ageless!

== History ==
=== Original version from the 19th century ===
The following is the oldest known version of the anthem, known as "O Bright Dawn of Bravery, Oi!" ("Oj, Junaštva Svjetla Zoro, oj!"). It was played in public for the first time in 1863 in the national theater in Belgrade. It was a component song of the "Battle of Grahovo or blood feud in Montenegro" (Бој на Грахову или крвна освета у Црној Гори) heroic play in three parts. The play and the Montenegrin folk song was also played/sung in the National Theater again in 1870 and 1876.

Serbo-Croatian
English
Cyrillic
Latin

Ој, јунаштва свјетла зоро,
Мајко наша Црна Горо!
На твојим се врлетима,
Разби сила душманима.
Једина си за слободу,
Ти остала српском роду.
Дат ће Бог и свјета мати
Да се једном све поврати!

Oj, junaštva svjetla zoro,
Majko naša Crna Goro!
Na tvojim se vrletima,
Razbi sila dušmanima.
Jedina si za slobodu,
Ti ostala srpskom rodu.
Dat će Bog i svjeta mati
Da se jednom sve povrati!

O bright dawn of bravery,
Our mother Montenegro!
High on the mountains,
The enemy's force has been crushed.
Only you are still remaining,
For the Serbs to regain their freedom
God and Holy Mother's willing
All shall be restored again!

=== World War II collaborationist version ===
In 1944, Sekula Drljević, a Montenegrin fascist collaborator, rearranged the lyrics of the Montenegrin patriotic song "Oj, svijetla majska zoro" to celebrate the creation of the Montenegrin puppet regime that had been established in July 1941.

Serbo-Croatian
English
Latin
Cyrillic

Vječna naša Crna Goro,
Tvoj Lovćen je car Jadrana,
Ka seljaka tvojih djela,
Kad su čija opjevana?
Volimo vas, brda tvrda,
I stravične vaše klance
Koji nikad ne poznaše
Sramotnoga ropstva lance.
Lovćen nam je oltar sveti,
Vazda smo mu vjerni bili,
U njega smo vjerovali
I njime se ponosili.
Otkada je Badnje veče
Našu vjeru očistilo,
Među nama, seljacima,
Nevjernika nije bilo.
Dok lovćenskoj našoj misli
Naša sloga daje krila,
Bit će gorda, bit će slavna
Domovina naša mila.
Slobode će čuvar biti
Naša brda, naše gore,
Dokle zemlju sunce grije
I dokle se ljudi bore.
Rijeka će naših vala,
Uskačući u dva mora,
Glas nositi oceanu,
Da je vječna Crna Gora.

Вјечна наша Црна Горо,
Твој Ловћен је цар Јадрана,
Ка сељака твојих дјела,
Кад су чија опјевана?
Волимо вас, брда тврда,
И стравичне ваше кланце
Који никад не познаше
Срамотнога ропства ланце.
Ловћен нам је олтар свети,
Вазда смо му вјерни били,
У њега смо вјеровали
И њиме се поносили.
Откада је Бадње вече
Нашу вјеру очистило,
Међу нама, сељацима,
Невјерника није било.
Док ловћенској нашој мисли
Наша слога даје крила,
Бит ће горда, бит ће славна
Домовина наша мила.
Слободе ће чувар бити
Наша брда, наше горе,
Докле земљу сунце грије
И докле се људи боре.
Ријека ће наших вала,
Ускачући у два мора,
Глас носити оцеану,
Да је вјечна Црна Гора.

Our eternal Montenegro,
Your Lovćen's the Adriatic ruler,
Like peasants of your stones,
When did they sing?
We love you, rocky hills,
And your gorges imposing
That never came to know
The shameful slavery chains.
Lovćen is our holy altar,
Forever we were faithful to him,
We have believed in him,
And we were proud of him.
Ever since Christmas Eve.
Our faith cleansed,
Among us peasants,
No infidel there was.
As long as our Lovćen's thought
Our concord gives strength,
It shall be proud, it shall be famous
Our dear homeland.
Freedom's keeper shall be
Our hills, our highlands,
So long as Earth's warmed by Sun
And so long as men are fighting.
Rivers of our waves shall,
Jumping into two seas
Bring the voice to the ocean
Eternal be our Montenegro.

=== World War II partisan version ===
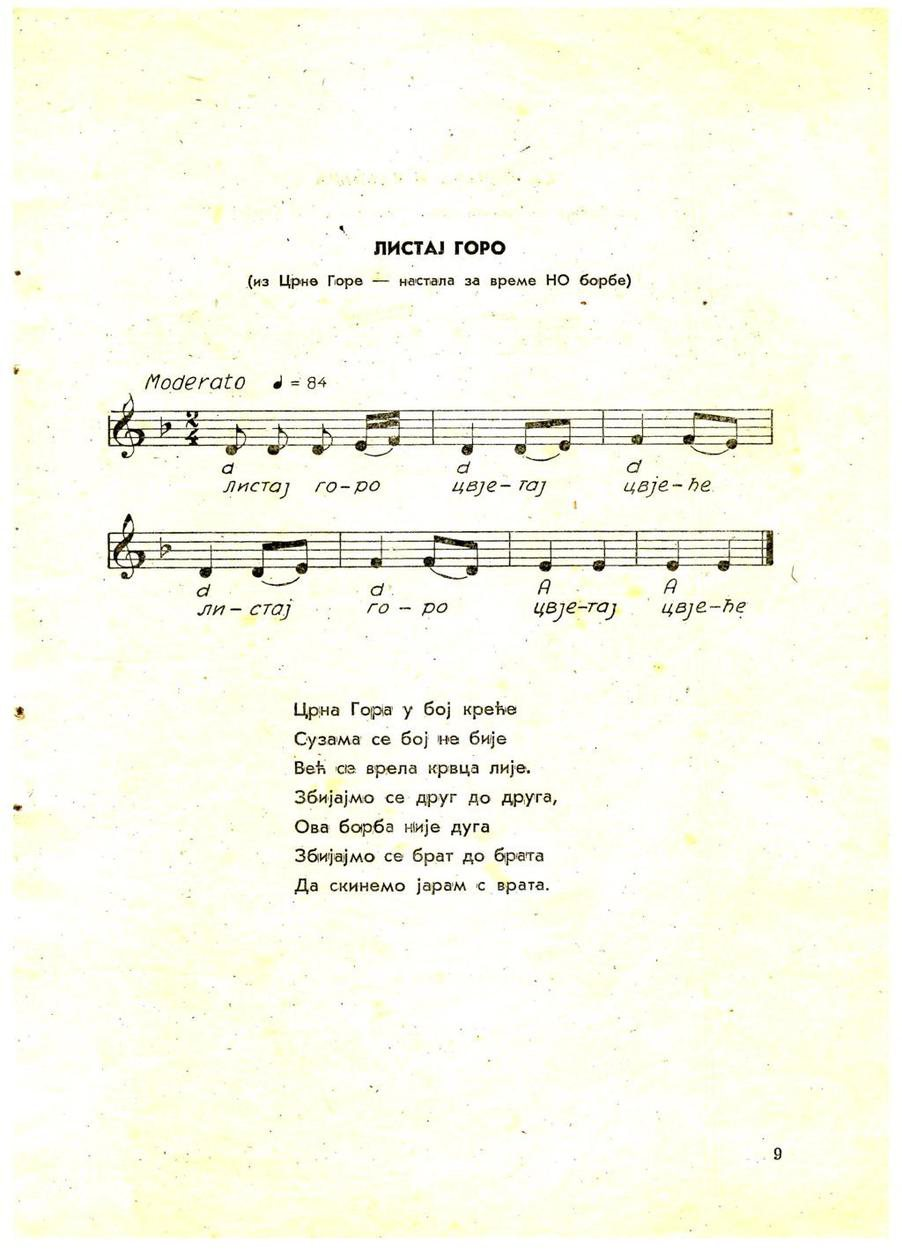
Listaj goro, folk song from World War II.

Serbo-Croatian
Latin
Cyrillic

Oj svijetla majska zoro,
Majko naša Crna Goro.
Sinovi smo tvog stijenja,
I čuvari tvog poštenja.
Listaj goro, cvetaj cveće,
Crna Gora u boj kreće.
Robovati nikom neće,
Robovati nikom neće.
U boj kreće ovih dana,
Prva četa partizana
Suzama se boj ne bije,
Već se vrela krvca lije.
Zbijajmo se drug do druga,
Ova borba biće duga.
Zbijajmo se brat do brata,
Da skinemo jaram s’ vrata.
Dolje lanci i okovi,
Ne vežu se sokolovi.

Ој свијетла мајска зоро,
Мајко наша Црна Горо.
Синови смо твог стијења,
И чувари твог поштења.
Листај горо, цветај цвеће,
Црна Гора у бој креће.
Робовати ником неће,
Робовати ником неће.
У бој креће ових дана,
Прва чета партизана
Сузама се бој не бије,
Већ се врела крвца лије.
Збијајмо се друг до друга,
Ова борба биће дуга.
Збијајмо се брат до брата,
Да скинемо јарам с’ врата.
Доље ланци и окови,
Не вежу се соколови.

=== Popular song ===
The song survived until today under various names as a popular Montenegrin folk song under the name "O Bright Dawn of May" ("Oj svijetla majska zoro"). This version of the song has been one of the several versions proposed in 1993 during the first discussion on the official state anthem, however, on which there was no consensus because of the disputed melodic value.

Serbo-Croatian
English
Cyrillic
Latin

Ој свијетла мајска зоро,
Мајко наша Црна Горо,
Синови смо твог стијења
И чувари твог поштења.
Ловћен нам је олтар свети,
У њега смо сви заклети.
На Ловћену Његош спава
Најмудрија свјетска глава.
Дурмиторе је л' ти жао
Што се Ловћен опјевао?
-Не, нека га, нек' се пјева
Заслуга је Његошева.

Oj svijetla majska zoro,
Majko naša Crna Goro,
Sinovi smo tvog stijenja
I čuvari tvog poštenja
Lovćen nam je oltar sveti,
U njega smo svi zakleti.
Na Lovćenu Njegoš spava
Najmudrija svjetska glava.
Durmitore je l' ti žao
Što se Lovćen opjevao?
-Ne, neka ga, nek' se pjeva
Zasluga je Njegoševa.

O bright dawn of May blazes forth,
Our mother Montenegro,
We are the sons of your gravel
And guardians of your candour
Lovćen is our holy altar,
We pay our respects to him
On Lovćen does Njegoš rest
the wisest of the World.
Durmitor, are you sorry
That Lovćen became famous?
-No, let it be, let it sing
Thankful for that is Njegoš.

== Controversies ==
As the president of Montenegro, Filip Vujanović participated on several occasions public debates regarding the disputed parts of the national anthem, which was made official in 2004. On that occasion, the official text of the anthem also included two stanzas (third and fourth) sung by the Montenegrin fascist and war criminal Sekula Drljević. Controversy over the disputed parts of the anthem in the following years led to open divisions among the citizens of Montenegro, and Vujanović himself on various occasions publicly criticized the adoption of Drljevic's stanzas, from which he distanced himself, advocating changes to the official text of the anthem. Vujanović repeatedly pointed out that the adoption of Drljevic's verses was not acceptable because their creator was a fascist or Nazi, and on the same occasion he warned of the danger of strengthening extreme Montenegrin nationalism and chauvinism.

== See also ==
- National Anthem of the Kingdom of Yugoslavia
- "Hey, Slavs"
- "Onamo, 'namo!"
- "Ubavoj nam Crnoj Gori"
