= Koncert kod Hajdučke česme =

Live album by Bijelo Dugme
- Released: December 31, 1977
- Recorded: Hajdučka česma, Belgrade, August 28, 1977 (crowd noise); Đuro Đaković Hall, Sarajevo, October 25, 1977 (actual concert)
- Genres: Hard rock; progressive rock; folk rock
- Length: 49:26
- Label: Jugoton
- Producer: Goran Bregović

Bijelo Dugme chronology
Eto! Baš hoću! (1976)	Koncert kod Hajdučke česme (1977)	Bitanga i princeza (1979)

Koncert kod Hajdučke česme (stylised koncert kod hajduccke ccesme on the cover, transl. "The Concert at Hajdučka česma") is the first live album by Yugoslav rock band Bijelo Dugme, released in 1977. The album's title refers to the band's famous concert played on August 28, 1977 near Hajdučka česma grounds at Košutnjak Park in Belgrade. However, the material on the record is only partially recorded at the said event.

The album was polled in 1998 as the 74th on the list of 100 Greatest Yugoslav Rock and Pop Albums in the book YU 100: najbolji albumi jugoslovenske rok i pop muzike (YU 100: The Best Albums of Yugoslav Pop and Rock Music).

== Background ==
During the promotional tour for the band's third studio album, 1976's Eto! Baš hoću! (There! I Will!), Bijelo Dugme experienced numerous difficulties, from clashes within the band to technical problems and dwindling attendance. After spending three years at the top of the Yugoslav rock scene, the band suddenly faced a clear drop in popularity. Combined with certain hiatus due to its twenty-seven-year-old leader Goran Bregović being called up for his mandatory Yugoslav People's Army (JNA) service, Bijelo Dugme looked for a way to reverse the negative trend as the tour neared its end. On suggestion from journalist and Bregović's close confidant Petar "Peca" Popović, they decided to hold a large open-air concert at Belgrade's Hajdučka česma with free admission — hoping to end the tour in spectacular fashion as well as to leave their fans on a positive note before temporarily disbanding due to Bregović's upcoming JNA duty.

The concert, held on Sunday, 28 August 1977, was attended by between 70,000 and 100,000 spectators, the biggest rock concert crowd in Yugoslavia until then. After the opening acts (Slađana Milošević, Tako, Zdravo, Džadžo, Suncokret, Ibn Tup and Leb i Sol) Bijelo Dugme played a successful concert. However, after disappointingly realizing the show's sound recording sounded poor on tape due to technical limitations and the wide open space, the band played another show at Đuro Đaković Hall in Sarajevo on 25 October 1977, which is the actual performance heard on the album. In the end, the only part of original Hajdučka česma concert that ended up on the album were the crowd reactions after each song.

Koncert kod Hajdučke česme would turn out to be the band's last album with keyboardist Laza Ristovski and drummer Ipe Ivandić, for the time being at least, as the two decided to leave the group after releasing a side project of their own, album Stižemo (Here We Come) in 1978. Both would eventually rejoin Bijelo Dugme; Ivandić in 1982 and Ristovski in 1984.

== Track listing ==
All songs were written by Goran Bregović, except where noted.

No.	Title	Lyrics	Length
1.	"Kad bi' bio bijelo dugme" ("If I Were a White Button")		8:35
2.	"Ništa mudro" ("Nothing Wise")		2:39
3.	"Blues za moju bivšu dragu" ("Blues For My Ex-Darling")		6:26
4.	"Selma"	Vlado Dijak	3:28
5.	"Ima neka tajna veza" ("There Is Some Secret Relationship")		3:18
6.	"Sve ću da ti dam, samo da zaigram" ("I'll Give You Everything, Only to Dance")		4:51
7.	"Patim, evo, deset dana" ("I've Been Suffering for 10 Days Now")		4:28
8.	"Da sam pekar" ("If I Were a Baker")		3:37
9.	"Tako ti je, mala moja, kad ljubi Bosanac" ("That's How it is, Baby, When you Kiss a Bosnian")		3:47
10.	"Ne spavaj, mala moja, muzika dok svira" ("Don't You Sleep, Baby, while the Music Is Playing")		3:08
11.	"Eto! Baš hoću!" ("There! I Will!")		5:04

== Personnel ==
- Goran Bregović - guitar, producer, mixed by
- Željko Bebek - vocals
- Zoran Redžić - bass guitar
- Ipe Ivandić - drums
- Laza Ristovski - keyboard

=== Additional personnel ===
- Miro Bevc - engineer
- Branko Podbrežnički - engineer
- Ognjen Blažević - photography
- Saša and Darko Strižak - photography
- Slobodan Purić - photography
- Jugoslav Vlahović - photography

== Legacy ==
The album was polled in 1998 as the 74th on the list of 100 Greatest Yugoslav Rock and Pop Albums in the book YU 100: najbolji albumi jugoslovenske rok i pop muzike (YU 100: The Best Albums of Yugoslav Pop and Rock Music).
