= Onamo, 'namo! =

Montenegrin and Serbian patriotic song

Onamo 'namo!
- English: There, Over There!
- Native name: Онамо, 'намо!
- Genre: Patriotic song
- Text: Nicholas I of Montenegro
- Composed: Davorin Jenko or František Wimmer (disputed)

Onamo 'namo! (Serbian Cyrillic: Онамо, 'намо!, lit. 'There, Over There!') is a patriotic song written by Prince Nicholas of Montenegro and first published in the Novi Sad-based Serbian-language literary journal Danica ("Morning Star") in 1867. Its melody can be attributed either to the Slovene composer Davorin Jenko or the Czech chaplain František Wimmer, the conductor of the Royal Montenegrin Army's military band.

The song's lyrics call for the liberation of Serb-inhabited lands from the Ottoman Empire, making reference to the medieval Serbian capital of Prizren, the Visoki Dečani monastery and the 14th-century Battle of Kosovo. Following its publication, it became popular among the Serb population of the Balkans, and came to be popularly referred to as the "Serbian Marseillaise". It was for a time considered a candidate to become the national anthem of both Serbia and Montenegro, but was rejected out of fear that its lyrics might provoke the Ottomans, and was later banned in both the Ottoman Empire and Austria-Hungary for promoting pan-Serb sentiment. In 1870, the Montenegrin government opted for Ubavoj nam Crnoj Gori ("To Our Beautiful Montenegro") as the country's national anthem, and in 1882, Serbia settled on Bože pravde ("God of Justice").

In 1918, Montenegro became part of the Kingdom of Serbs, Croats and Slovenes (later renamed Yugoslavia) and Nicholas was forced into exile. Onamo, 'namo! was proposed as the anthem of the nascent Republic of Montenegro in 1992, and after the Federal Republic of Yugoslavia was renamed Serbia and Montenegro in 2003, as the national anthem of the newly formed state union. Following Montenegro's decision to leave the state union in 2006, Onamo, 'namo! was proposed as the newly independent country's national anthem. Due to its pan-Serb themes and the fact that Montenegro is not explicitly mentioned in its lyrics, the Montenegrin government instead decided to adopt Oj, svijetla majska zoro ("Oh, Beautiful Dawn of May").

== Composition and themes ==
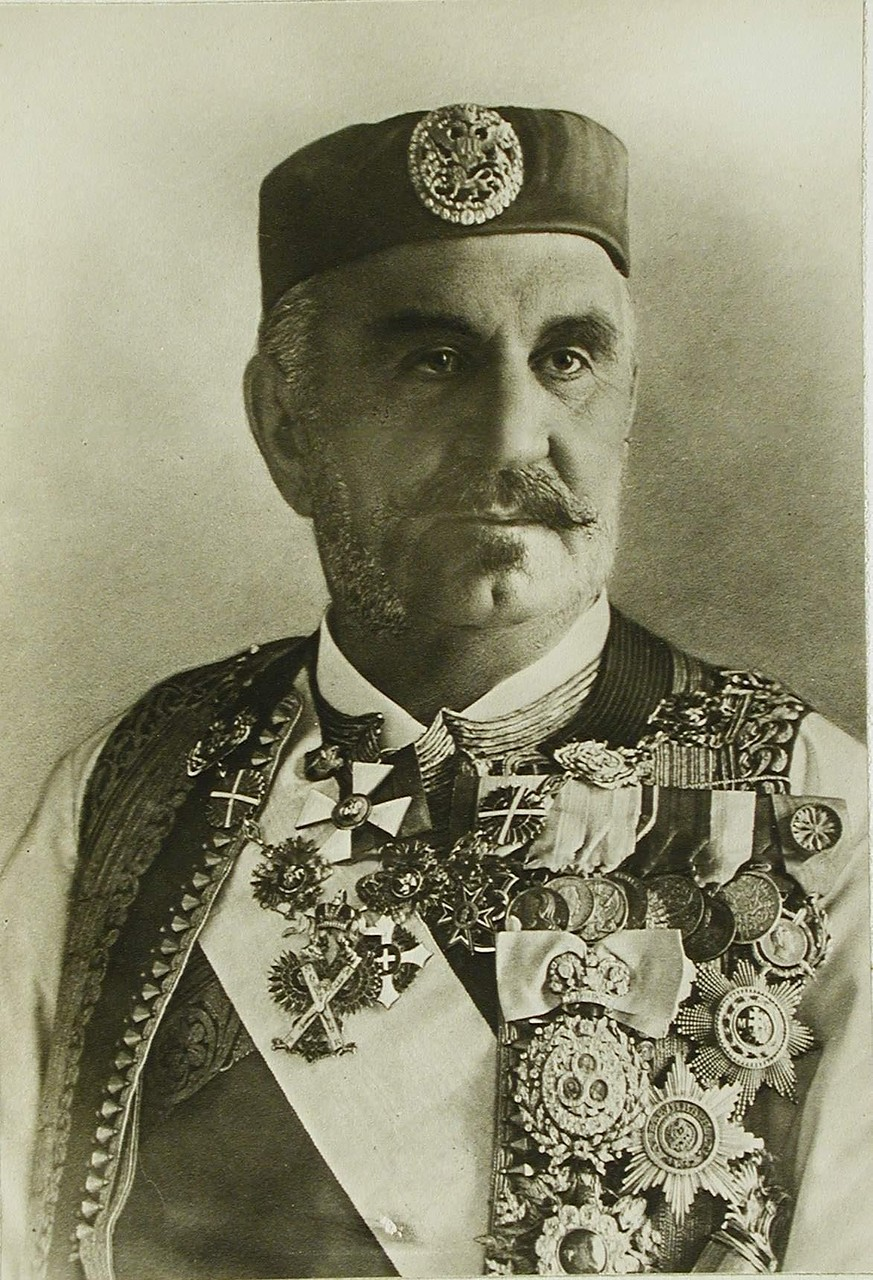
Onamo 'namo! was written by Prince Nicholas I of Montenegro. In 1910, he was elevated to the status of king.

Nicholas I (Serbian: Nikola I, Serbian Cyrillic: Никола I), of the house of Petrović-Njegoš, acceded to the throne of the Principality of Montenegro in 1860, following the assassination of his uncle Prince Danilo, Montenegro's first secular ruler. Over the preceding centuries, Montenegro had been one of the few polities in Southeastern Europe that managed to remain essentially independent of the Ottoman Empire. A theocracy for much of its existence, it was ruled by a series of prince-bishops until Danilo's ascent in 1851. Upon coming to power, Nicholas waged numerous wars against the Ottomans, greatly expanding his country's territory. Like his predecessors, he considered himself a Serb and was generally supportive of the Serbian national cause. In addition to being a statesman, he was also an accomplished poet, playwright and orator.

The lyrics to Onamo, 'namo! were first published in 1867 in the Serbian-language literary journal Danica ("Morning Star"), based in Novi Sad, which at the time was part of the Austrian Empire. (Note: It appeared on the front cover of the journal's thirty-first issue on 22 November [O.S. 10 November] 1867, and shortly thereafter, it made an appearance in the almanac Orlić ("Little Eagle"), which was published in Cetinje.) By some accounts, the song's melody can be attributed to the Slovene composer Davorin Jenko. According to other sources, the melody was composed by a Montenegrin chaplain of Czech descent named František Wimmer, (Note: In Montenegro, Wimmer's name was rendered "Franjo Vimer".) and is said to have been based on that of a contemporary song extolling the Italian revolutionary Giuseppe Garibaldi. Wimmer was the conductor of the Royal Montenegrin Army's military band, which had been established in Podgorica in 1889.

Onamo, 'namo! is a pan-Serb anthem whose lyrics call for the re-establishment of the medieval Serbian state, which had been consumed by the Ottoman Empire over the course of the 14th and 15th centuries. Its lyrics call for the liberation of all Serb-inhabited lands, a goal that Nicholas frequently referenced to foreign diplomats in the Montenegrin capital Cetinje, and describe Nicholas' desire to set foot in Serbia's medieval capital, Prizren, then the seat of the eponymous Ottoman administrative unit known as the Sanjak of Prizren. The lyrics also reference Miloš Obilić, the Serbian knight who was reputed to have slain Sultan Murad at the Battle of Kosovo in June 1389, as well as Jug Bogdan and the nine Jugović brothers, who were said to have perished in the battle. The Visoki Dečani monastery, in western Kosovo, is also referenced.

Locations and figures mentioned in the song

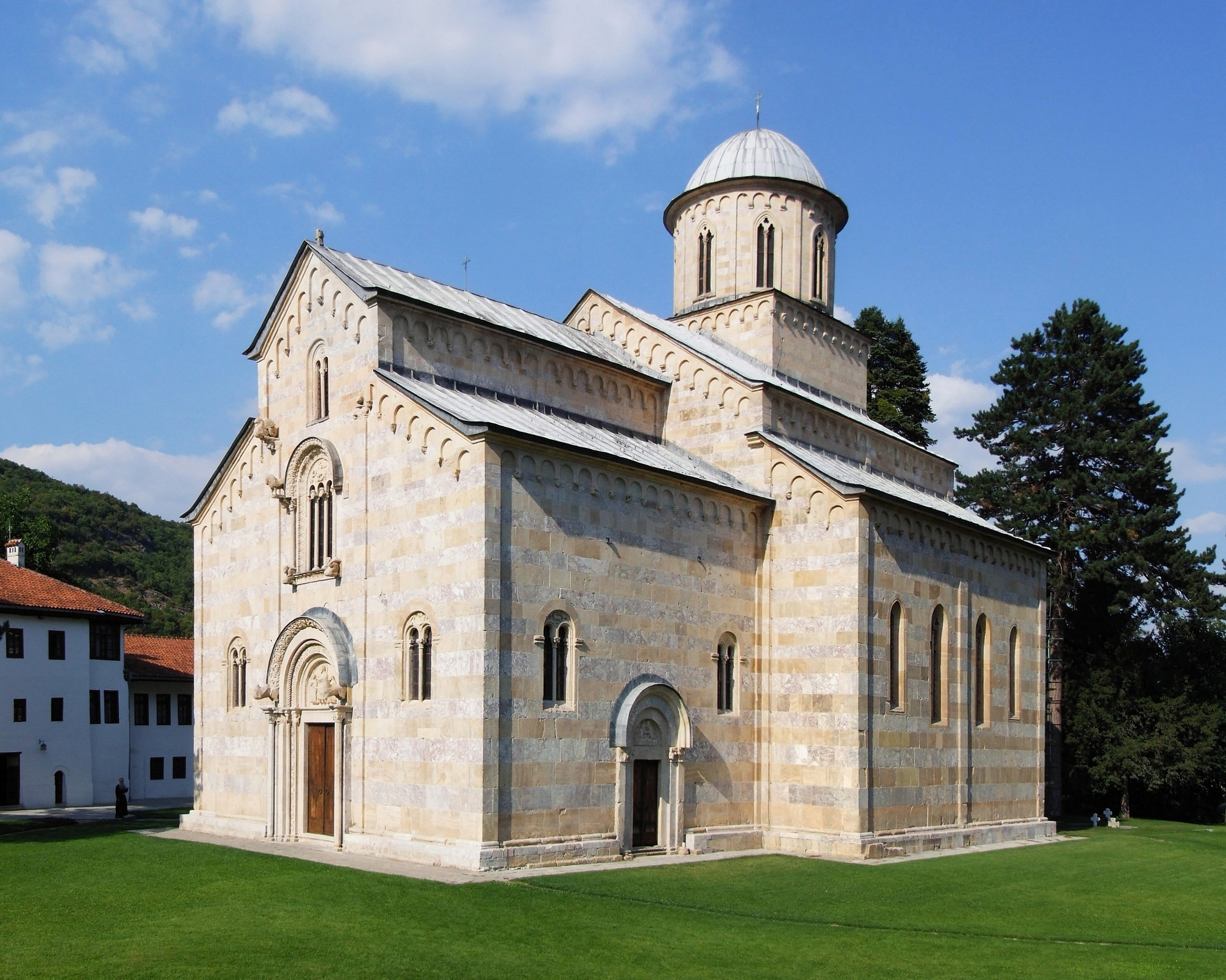
Visoki Dečani

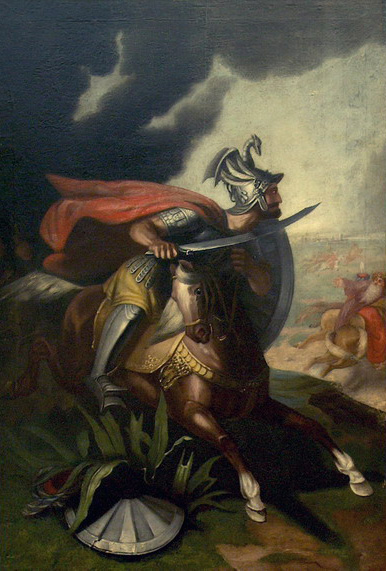
Miloš Obilić

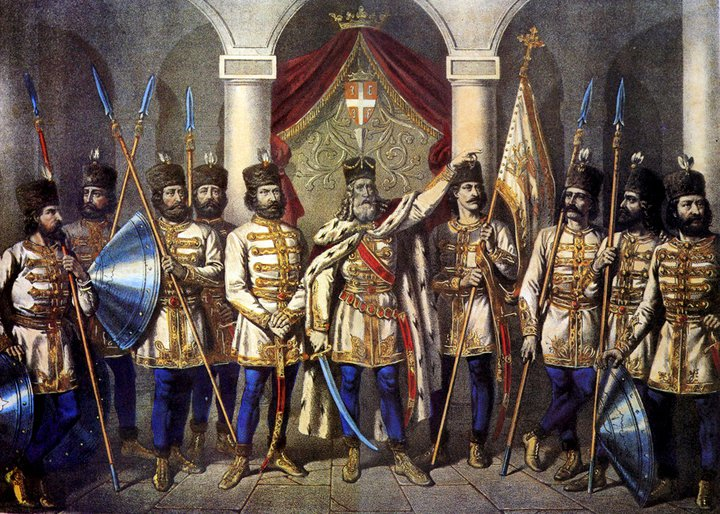
Jug Bogdan and the nine Jugović brothers

== Legacy ==
Onamo, 'namo! cemented Nicholas' reputation as an accomplished poet among his subjects, as well as the Serb population of the Balkans more broadly. (Note: The literary critic Bogdan Popović included Onamo, 'namo! in his 1911 book Antologija novije srpske lirike ("Anthology of Modern Serbian Lyric Poetry"). Citing the song, literary scholar Jovan Deretić described Nicholas as the literary heir to the Montenegrin prince-bishop and poet Petar II Petrović-Njegoš.) "The people accepted this poem as their battle song," the historian Olga Zirojević writes, "as a call to liberate those Serbian people still under Turkish occupation, as a great national duty which had to be accomplished." At the height of its popularity, it was widely referred to as the "Serbian Marseillaise". (Note: In the late 19th century, the song became the unofficial anthem of the literary association known as Crnogorski Borac ("Montenegrin Warrior"), which was presided over by the Bosnian Serb writer Vasa Pelagić. Writing in the early 20th century, the British anthropologist and travel writer Edith Durham described it as a "national song for the Serbian race".) Despite the widespread misconception that it once served as Montenegro's national anthem, this was never the case. Two years before its publication, Danica had published the lyrics to several candidates for the Serbian national anthem, none of which were accepted by the Serbian government. Since the lyrics of Onamo 'namo! called for the separation of Kosovo from the Ottoman Empire, the Serbian authorities decided against adopting it for fear of provoking the Ottomans. For similar reasons, the Montenegrin government was reluctant to officially adopt it as Montenegro's national anthem, and in 1870, instead selected Ubavoj nam Crnoj Gori ("To Our Beautiful Montenegro"). In 1882, the Serbian government settled on Bože pravde ("God of Justice"). Nevertheless, Onamo, 'namo! became highly popular among the Serb population of the Balkans, and was sung on many official and unofficial occasions. For this reason, it was banned in the Ottoman Empire and Austria-Hungary.

In the early 20th century, a variation of the song titled Ovamo, 'vamo! (Here, o'er Here!) became popular among Bosnian Serbs; it called for Serbia and Montenegro to free Bosnia and Herzegovina from Ottoman and Austro-Hungarian domination. In 1910, the Montenegrin People's Assembly voted unanimously to elevate Montenegro to the status of a kingdom and Nicholas to the title of king. During the First Balkan War of 1912–1913, the Royal Serbian Army managed to capture Prizren before the Royal Montenegrin Army. Prior to the war, Nicholas had been hoping to incorporate the town into Montenegro, and the references he made to it in Onamo, 'namo! imbued this goal with additional significance. During World War I, Montenegro and Serbia fought side by side against the Central Powers, and were both occupied by Austria-Hungary for several years. After the Central Powers' collapse in 1918, Montenegro was annexed by Serbia, then ruled by Nicholas' son-in-law, King Peter. In short order, both states were incorporated into the newly created Kingdom of Serbs, Croats and Slovenes, governed by Serbia's ruling Karađorđević dynasty. Nicholas was exiled to France, where he died in 1921. In 1992, Onamo, 'namo! was one of three compositions proposed by the Montenegrin authorities to become the Republic of Montenegro's new national anthem, alongside Oj, svijetla majska zoro ("Oh, Bright Dawn of May") and Ubavoj nam Crnoj Gori. At the time, Montenegro was one of two republics that formed the Federal Republic of Yugoslavia, which was created following the collapse of the Socialist Federal Republic of Yugoslavia in 1991–1992. In 2003, after the Federal Republic of Yugoslavia was renamed Serbia and Montenegro, Onamo, 'namo! was proposed as the national anthem of the newly formed state union.

Following Montenegro's decision to leave the state union after an independence referendum in 2006, the song was proposed as the newly independent country's national anthem by the predominantly Serb opposition. (Note: One opposition movement, the People's Party, had Onamo, 'namo! as its own anthem.) This was met with hostility from pro-independence politicians since it does not contain any explicit references to Montenegro in its lyrics, neither as an entity separate from Serbia nor even as a distinct region. The song's references to "Serb lands" and the Battle of Kosovo also disqualified it in the eyes of Montenegro's pro-independence ruling party, the Democratic Party of Socialists. According to the scholars Aleksandar Pavković and Christopher Kelen: "The government of Montenegro was looking for a song that would implicitly or explicitly justify the separation of its singers, Montenegrins, from the Serbs." Oj, svijetla majska zoro, whose lyrics had been rearranged by the Montenegrin separatist and World War II fascist collaborator Sekula Drljević, was chosen as the national anthem instead, to the displeasure of many Montenegrin Serbs, who according to the scholar Kenneth Morrison, lamented its "fascistic connotations".

== Lyrics ==
Source: Pavković & Kelen (2016, pp. 143–144)

in Serbian Cyrillic:
Онамо, 'намо... за брда она,

говоре да је разорен двор
мојега цара; онамо веле,
био је негда јуначки збор.

Онамо, 'намо... да виђу Призрен!
Та то је моје – дома ћу доћ'!
Старина мила тамо ме зове,
ту морам једном оружан поћ'.

Онамо, 'намо... са развалина
дворова царских врагу ћу рећ':
"С огњишта милог бјежи ми, куго,
зајам ти морам враћати већ'!"

Онамо, 'намо... за брда она
казују да је зелени гај
под ким се дижу Дечани свети:
молитва у њих присваја рај.

Онамо, 'намо... за брда она,
ђе небо плаво савија свод;
на српска поља, на поља бојна,
онамо, браћо, спремајмо ход!

Онамо, 'намо... за брда она
погажен коњ'ма кликује Југ:
"У помоћ, ђецо, у помоћ, синци,
светит' ме старца, свет вам је дуг!"

Онамо, 'намо... сабљи за стара
његова ребра да тупим рез
по турским ребрим'; да б'једној раји
њом истом с руку рес'јецам вез!

Онамо, 'намо... за брда она
Милошев, кажу, пребива гроб!
Онамо покој добићу души,
кад Србин више не буде роб.

in Serbian Latin:
Onamo, 'namo... za brda ona,

govore da je razoren dvor
mojega cara; onamo vele,
bio je negda junački zbor.

Onamo, 'namo... da viđu Prizren!
Ta to je moje – doma ću doć'!
Starina mila tamo me zove,
tu moram jednom oružan poć'.

Onamo, 'namo... sa razvalina
dvorova carskih vragu ću reć'!
"S ognjišta milog bježi mi, kugo,
zajam ti moram vraćati već'!"

Onamo, 'namo... za brda ona
kazuju da je zeleni gaj
pod kim se dižu Dečani sveti:
molitva u njih prisvaja raj.

Onamo, 'namo... za brda ona
đe nebo plavo savija svod;
na srpska polja, na polja bojna
onamo, braćo, spremajmo hod!

Onamo, 'namo... za brda ona
pogažen konj'ma klikuje Jug:
"U pomoć, đeco, u pomoć, sinci,
svetit' me starca, svet vam je dug!

Onamo, 'namo... sablji za stara
njegova rebra da tupim rez
po turskim rebrim'; da b'jednoj raji
njom istom s ruku res'jecam vez!

Onamo, 'namo... za brda ona
Milošev, kažu, prebiva grob!
Onamo pokoj dobiću duši,
kad Srbin više ne bude rob.

in English:
There, over there... beyond those hills,

Ruined lies, they say, my
Emperor's palace; there, they say,
Once, heroes had gathered.

There, over there... I see Prizren!
It is all mine – home I shall come!
Beloved antiquity calls me there,
Armed I must come there one day.

There, over there... from on top of the ruins
Of Emperors' palaces to the enemy I will say:
"Flee from my beloved home you plague,
Already your debt I must repay!"

There, over there... beyond those hills,
Lies a green grove, they say,
Under which rises up Holy Dečani:
A prayer said within Paradise claims.

There, over there... beyond those hills,
Where sky of blue bends down her arch;
On to Serb fields, on to battle fields,
There, brothers, prepare to march!

There, over there... beyond those hills,
Trampled by horses' hooves cries out Jug:
"Come help me, children, come help me, sons,
Avenge the old man – sacred is your task!"

There, over there... for the ribs of the old man,
I'll dull my sabre's edge on
The ribs of the Turks; and cut the shackles
From the wrists of the wretched Christian masses!

There, over there... beyond those hills,
Lies there, they say, Miloš's grave!
There my soul eternal peace shall gain,
When (the) Serb is no longer a slave.
