= Kad bi' bio bijelo dugme =

Studio album by Bijelo Dugme
- Released: 18 November 1974
- Recorded: September 1974
- Studio: Akademik Studio, Ljubljana
- Genre: Hard rock; progressive rock; folk rock; blues rock
- Length: 34:24
- Label: Jugoton
- Producer: Bijelo Dugme

Bijelo Dugme chronology
Kad bi' bio bijelo dugme (1974)	Šta bi dao da si na mom mjestu (1975)

Kad bi' bio bijelo dugme (transl. "If I Were a White Button") is the 1974 debut studio album from influential Yugoslav rock band Bijelo Dugme.

The album was polled the 14th on the 100 Greatest Yugoslav Rock and Pop Albums list in the 1998 book YU 100: najbolji albumi jugoslovenske rok i pop muzike (YU 100: The Best Albums of Yugoslav Pop and Rock Music).

== Recording ==
Prior to the release of the album, Bijelo Dugme had large success with their 7-inch singles. The band's record label, Jugoton, intended to release Bijelo Dugme's first album during the spring of 1975, but the group's manager, Vladimir Mihaljek, managed to persuade the label's executives to release the record during the autumn of 1974. The recording sessions started on 2 October 1974 in Akademik Studio in Ljubljana. The album was produced by the band members themselves, with help from Akademik Studio's in-house producer Dečo Žgur. The album featured a new version of the title track, which the band had originally released as a 7-inch single in 1973 while still performing under the name Jutro.

== Track listing ==
All songs were written by Goran Bregović, except where noted.

No.	Title	Lyrics	Music	Length
1.	"Kad bi' bio bijelo dugme" ("If I Were a White Button")			10:23
2.	"Blues za moju bivšu dragu" ("Blues For My Ex-Darling")			6:23
3.	"Ne spavaj, mala moja, muzika dok svira" ("Don't You Sleep, Baby, while the Music Is Playing")			2:30
4.	"Sve ću da ti dam, samo da zaigram" ("I'll Give You Everything Only to Dance")			4:04
5.	"Selma"	Vlado Dijak	Goran Bregović	6:10
6.	"Patim, evo, deset dana" ("I've Been Suffering for Ten Days Now")			4:51

== Personnel ==
- Goran Bregović – guitar, harmonica
- Željko Bebek – vocals
- Zoran Redžić – bass guitar
- Ipe Ivandić – drums
- Vlado Pravdić – organ, synthesizer, electric piano, piano

=== Additional personnel ===
- Miro Bevc – engineer
- Dragan S. Stefanović – design, cover photo
- Boris Dučić – photography

== Album cover ==
A young guy came up to me on the street, pointing to a girl short distance away and asking: 'Do you know that girl?'. I looked, recognizing the girl I had photographed for the [album] cover. I waved hello, and the guy immediately went over, slapped her face, calling her a whore. I asked him: 'Why?'. His answer was that she had told him she's on the cover and that he only wanted to make sure whether it's true. After that, they left together as if nothing had just happened...

— Designer Dragan S. Stefanović on the album cover model.

The album cover was designed by designer Dragan S. Stefanović, who would go on to design covers for several of the band's future releases. Four decades after the album release, it was revealed that the name of the model was Ljiljana Božanić.

Rock critic Dražen Vrdoljak stated in 1981 that Kad bi bio bijelo dugme album cover "represented a shift in conceiving the covers of domestic [Yugoslav] rock albums, identical to the shift Bregović's music made on our rock scene".

== Reception ==
Professional ratings
Review scores
Source	Rating
Džuboks	Favorable

The album was well received by audience and critics alike. In a Džuboks magazine review, Maksa Ćatović wrote:

The sounds imprinted on this record can, with full confidence, be referred to as Yugoslav pop music. YU Grupa used to incorporate folk motifs and now the Bijelo Dugme guys are doing it, seemingly much better and much closer to the audience's taste. We could even call this the first Yugoslav rock album.

The intro to the album's opening track was referred to as "pastirski" (shepherd-like) by rock critic Dražen Vrdoljak in his review published on 30 November 1974 in Studio. Few weeks later, a write-up about the album in Tina magazine used the term "pastirski rok" (shepherd rock). The term was soon picked up by a wider section of the Yugoslav public and used frequently, often pejoratively, to describe Bijelo Dugme's Deep Purple and Led Zeppelin-influenced hard rock sound mixed in with the Balkans folk music elements.

The album's biggest hits were the title track, rock and roll-influenced hit "Ne spavaj, mala moja, muzika dok svira", and the ballad "Selma", the latter featuring lyrics written by poet Vlado Dijak. Immediately upon its release, the album broke the record for the best selling Yugoslav rock album held by YU Grupa's debut album, which sold in more than 30,000 copies. In February 1975, Bijelo Dugme was awarded a gold record at the Opatija Festival, as they sold more than 40,000 copies of the debut. The final number of copies sold was roughly 141,000.

== Legacy ==
The album was polled in 1998 as the 14th on the list of 100 Greatest Yugoslav Rock and Pop Albums in the book YU 100: najbolji albumi jugoslovenske rok i pop muzike (YU 100: The Best Albums of Yugoslav Rock and Pop Music).

The title track was polled in 2000 as the 97th on the Rock Express Top 100 Yugoslav Rock Songs of All Times list.

In 2015, Kad bi bio bijelo dugme album cover was ranked 20th on the list of 100 Greatest Album Covers of Yugoslav Rock published by web magazine Balkanrock.

== Covers ==
- Yugoslav pop trio Aska recorded a Bijelo Dugme songs medley on their 1982 album Disco Rock, featuring, among other Bijelo Dugme songs, "Kad bi' bio bijelo dugme" and "Patim, evo, deset dana".
- Yugoslav and Bosnian folk rock band Nervozni Poštar recorded a cover of "Ne spavaj, mala moja, muzika dok svira" on their 1987 album Ništa više nije kao prije (Nothing's like It Used to Be).
- Serbian and Yugoslav singer-songwriter Srđan Marjanović recorded a cover of "Selma" on his 1989 album Ako jednom puknem ja (If I Go into Pieces One Day).
- Slovenian and Yugoslav rock band Sokoli recorded a cover of "Ne spavaj, mala moja, muzika dok svira", featuring guest appearance by Serbian and Yugoslav musician Momčilo Bajagić on vocals, on their 1992 album Satan je blazn zmatran (Satan Is Dog Tired).
- Serbian rock band Prljavi Inspektor Blaža i Kljunovi recorded a cover of "Ne spavaj, mala moja, muzika dok svira" on their 1994 live album Igra rokenrol SR Jugoslavija (FR Yugoslavia Is Dancing to Rock 'n' Roll).
- Croatian pop singer Severina recorded a cover of "Ne spavaj, mala moja, muzika dok svira" on her 1993 album Dalmatinka (Girl from Dalmatia).
- Serbian pop rock band Cony recorded a cover of "Kad bi' bio bijelo dugme" on their 1993 album Šta bih dao da sam na tvom mjestu (What Would I Give to Be in Your Place), the title of the album alluding to the title of Bijelo Dugme's second album, Šta bi dao da si na mom mjestu (What Would You Give to Be in My Place).
- Croatian and Yugoslav singer-songwriter and former Azra leader Branimir "Džoni" Štulić released covers of "Selma" and "Kad bi bio bijelo dugme" on his official YouTube channel in 2011 and 2012 respectively.
