= Singl ploče (1976–1980) =

Compilation album by Bijelo Dugme
- Released: 1982
- Genres: Hard rock; folk rock; new wave
- Length: 41:22
- Label: Jugoton
- Producer: Various

Bijelo Dugme chronology
Singl ploče (1974–1975) (1981)	Singl ploče (1976–1980) (1982)	...a milicija trenira strogoću! (i druge pjesmice za djecu) (1983)

Singl ploče (1976–1980) (transl. "7-inch singles (1976–1980)") is a compilation album by Yugoslav rock band Bijelo Dugme, released in 1982.

== Background ==
In early 1982, Bijelo Dugme performed in Innsbruck, Austria, at a manifestation conceptualized as a symbolic passing of the torch whereby the Winter Olympic Games last host city (Innsbruck) makes a handover to the next one (Bijelo Dugme's homecity Sarajevo). On their return to Yugoslavia, the band's equipment was seized by the customs, as it was discovered that they had put new equipment into old boxes. The band's record label, Jugoton decided to lend 150,000,000 Yugoslav dinars to Bijelo Dugme, in order to pay the fine. In order to regain part of the money as soon as possible, Jugoton decided to release two compilation albums, Singl ploče (1974-1975) and Singl ploče (1976-1980).

== Track listing ==
All tracks written by Goran Bregović, except where noted.

No.	Title	Lyrics	Music	Length
1.	"Tako ti je mala moja kad ljubi Bosanac" ("That's How it is, Baby, When You Kiss a Bosnian")			3:53
2.	"Ne spavaj mala moja muzika dok svira" ("Don't You Sleep, Baby, While the Music is Playing")			2:30
3.	"Milovan"			2:05
4.	"Goodbye, Amerika" ("Goodbye, America")			4:25
5.	"Eto! Baš hoću" ("There! I Will!")			3:53
6.	"Došao sam da ti kažem da odlazim" ("I'm Here to Tell You That I'm Leaving")			3:39
7.	"Bitanga i princeza" ("The Brute And the Princess")			3:48
8.	"Dede bona, sjeti se, de tako ti svega" ("Come on, Remember, for God's Sake")			4:38
9.	"Pristao sam biću sve što hoće" ("I Agreed, I'll Be Anything They Want")	Duško Trifunović	Goran Bregović	3:13
10.	"Šta je, tu je" ("What's There is There")	Duško Trifunović	Goran Bregović	3:05
11.	"Dobro Vam jutro, Petrović Petre" ("Good Morning, Petrović Petar")			2:28
12.	"Na zadnjem sjedištu moga auta" ("In the Back Seat of My Car")			3:53

== Personnel ==
- Željko Bebek - vocals
- Goran Bregović - guitar, producer (tracks: 3, 4, 11)
- Zoran Redžić - bass guitar, producer (track 7)
- Ipe Ivandić - drums (tracks: 4, 8, 9, 10, 12)
- Milić Vukašinović - drums (tracks: 1, 5, 6, 7)
- Điđi Jankelić - drums (tracks: 2, 3, 8, 10, 11)
- Laza Ristovski - keyboards (tracks: 2, 4, 5, 6, 7)
- Vlado Pravdić - keyboards (tracks: 1, 3, 8, 9, 10, 11, 12)

=== Additional personnel ===
- Neil Harrison - producer (tracks: 1, 5, 6, 7, 12)
- Zlatko Hold - producer (tracks: 9, 10)
- Vladimir Mihaljek - producer (track 2)
- Miro Bevc - recorded by (tracks: 2, 8, 10)
- Rade Ercegovac - recorded by (tracks: 6, 11, 12)
- Pete Henderson - recorded by (tracks: 1, 6)
- Gus Mossler - recorded by (tracks: 3, 4)
- Nick Glennie-Smith - recorded by (tracks: 7, 12)
- Jon Kelly - recorded by (track 5)
- Branko Podbrežnički - recorded by (track 8)
- Tahir Durkalić - recorded by (track 8)
- Siniša Škarica - compiled by
- Goran Trbuljak - artwork (design)
- Vladan Jovanović - artwork (drawing)
