= ...a milicija trenira strogoću! (i druge pjesmice za djecu) =

Studio album by Ratimir Boršić Rača & Bijelo Dugme
- Released: 1983
- Genre: Pop rock; children's music
- Label: Jugoton
- Producer: Goran Bregović

Bijelo Dugme chronology
Singl ploče (1976–1980) (1982)	...a milicija trenira strogoću! (i druge pjesmice za djecu) (1983)	Uspavanka za Radmilu M. (1983)

...a milicija trenira strogoću! (i druge pjesmice za djecu) (transl. "...and Militia Trains Strictness (and Other Songs for Children)") is a children's music album recorded by Yugoslav child singer Ratimir Boršić "Rača" and Yugoslav rock band Bijelo Dugme, released in 1983.

== Background ==
The lyrics for the album were written by poet Duško Trifunović, with whom Bijelo Dugme had previously cooperated on several occasions, and the music was composed by Bijelo Dugme leader Goran Bregović. All the members of Bijelo Dugme took part in the recording, excluding the band's vocalist Željko Bebek. It was initially planned for pop rock singer Seid Memić "Vajta" to sing the vocals, but eventually, vocals were recorded by the eleven-year-old Ratimir Boršić "Rača". The album was released under the names of both band and singer. The album cover was designed by Bijelo Dugme's old collaborator Dragan S. Stefanović.

== Track listing ==
All lyrics are written by Duško Trifunović; all music is composed by Goran Bregović.

No.	Title	Length
1.	"...a milicija trenira strogoću!" ("...and Militia Trains Strictness!")	3:34
2.	"Pjesma o vozovima" ("Song about Trains")	2:49
3.	"Pjesma o mlijeku" ("Song about Milk")	2:30
4.	"Pjesma o bašti, parku i cvijeću" ("Song about Garden, Park and Flowers")	3:20
5.	"Pjesma o žmurki i lovu" ("Song about Hide-and-Seek")	2:45
6.	"Divlji zapad" ("Wild West")	2:38
7.	"Pjesma o životinjama" ("Song about Animals")	2:40
8.	"Pjesma o Mocartu" ("Song about Mozart")	2:40
9.	"Lava dva" ("Two Lions")	2:37

== Personnel ==
- Ratimir Boršić – vocals

=== Bijelo Dugme ===
- Goran Bregović – guitar, producer, recorded by
- Zoran Redžić – bass guitar
- Ipe Ivandić – drums
- Vlado Pravdić – keyboards

=== Additional personnel ===
- Duško Trifunović – lyrics
- Mahmut Ferović – recorded by
- Dragan S. Stefanović – design

== Reception ==
The album was well received by the critics, who pointed out that Bregović and Trifunović did not consider the child audience "mentally immature".

== Legacy ==
The title track was often performed by Bijelo Dugme in concert, and a live version of it appears on the band's live albums Mramor, kamen i željezo (1987) and Turneja 2005: Sarajevo, Zagreb, Beograd (2005).
