= Selma (Bijelo Dugme song) =

Selma is a rock ballad recorded in former Yugoslavia by the influential Bosnian rock band Bijelo Dugme. This song appeared for the first time on their 1974 debut album Kad bi bio bijelo dugme.

== Background ==
"Selma" is a song about a young girl traveling to university. The narrator is saying goodbye to her but is unable to express his feelings for her. All he can say is goodbye and please do not lean out of the train window.

The text of the song was written by Vlado Dijak, a former Yugoslav poet and songwriter, based on a real event in 1949, when he accompanied Selma Borić, the young Zenica-born girl in which he was secretly in love with, to the train station in Sarajevo. Selma died in January 2021 at age 91.

The music was composed by Goran Bregović.

== Versions ==
=== Studio version ===
The version that we hear on the record is approximately six minutes and ten seconds in length. The song has two verses, but the second verse is repeated for the 3rd verse. There is an organ solo done by organist Vlado Pravdić as well as guitar riffs played by Bregović. The song features Picardy third.

=== Koncert kod Hajdučke česme version ===
For their 1978 live release Koncert kod Hajdučke česme the band had a much shorter version of the song. This version ran for only 3.5 minutes, and the second verse was not repeated. Also the organ solo played in the beginning and the middle of the song was not included thus shortening the song's length as opposed to the studio version.

The song uses Hammond Organ.

=== Mramor, kamen i željezo version (1987) ===
The Third version of Selma was released on the band's third live album named Mramor, kamen i željezo. Released as a double album, the material was recorded throughout 1987 during the band's tour in support of their album "Pljuni i zapjevaj moja Jugoslavijo." In this "naked" version, Bregovic took off organ as a previously dominant instrument which gave the song religious sense and decided to simplify the song, bass and drums were set as a main instruments. Although released on live album, the third version of Selma was made up in the recording studio.
