= Sanjao sam noćas da te nemam (Velike rock balade) =

Compilation album by Bijelo Dugme
- Released: 1984
- Recorded: 1974–1983
- Genre: Hard rock; blues rock; progressive rock; symphonic rock
- Length: 67:57
- Label: Jugoton
- Producer: Goran Bregović; Neil Harrison

Bijelo Dugme chronology
Uspavanka za Radmilu M. (1983)	Sanjao sam noćas da te nemam (Velike rock balade) (1984)	Bijelo Dugme (1984)

Sanjao sam noćas da te nemam (Velike rock balade) (transl. "Last Night I Dreamed that I Didn't Have You (Great Rock Ballads)") is a compilation album by Yugoslav rock band Bijelo Dugme, released in 1984, featuring their ballads recorded between 1974 and 1983. The album's name derives from the band's popular ballad "Sanjao sam noćas da te nemam" from their 1976 album Eto! Baš hoću! (There I Will).

Original release featured 10 tracks, while the 1994 CD reissue featured three additional tracks.

== Track listing ==
=== A side ===
No.	Title	Length
1.	"Ima neka tajna veza"	3:30
2.	"Selma"	3:25
3.	"Došao sam da ti kažem da odlazim"	3:39
4.	"Loše vino"	2:37
5.	"Pristao sam biću sve što hoće"	3:01
6.	"Sanjao sam noćas da te nemam"	6:51

=== B side ===
No.	Title	Length
1.	"Ne gledaj me tako i ne ljubi me više"	5:40
2.	"Kad zaboraviš juli"	4:29
3.	"Ako možeš zaboravi"	4:59
4.	"Sve će to mila moja prekriti ruzmarin, snjegovi i šaš"	7:57

=== 1994 CD reissue ===
No.	Title	Length
1.	"Šta bi dao da si na mom mjestu"	6:47
2.	"Ima neka tajna veza"	3:30
3.	"Selma"	3:25
4.	"Došao sam da ti kažem da odlazim"	3:39
5.	"Blues za moju bivšu dragu"	6:17
6.	"Loše vino"	2:37
7.	"Ove ću noći naći blues"	4:17
8.	"Sanjao sam noćas da te nemam"	6:51
9.	"Ne gledaj me tako i ne ljubi me više"	5:40
10.	"Kad zaboraviš juli"	4:29
11.	"Ako možeš zaboravi"	4:59
12.	"Sve će to mila moja prekriti ruzmarin, snjegovi i šaš"	7:57
13.	"Pristao sam biću sve što hoće"	3:01

== Personnel ==
- Goran Bregović - guitar, producer
- Željko Bebek - vocals
- Zoran Redžić - bass guitar
- Ipe Ivandić - drums
- Điđi Jankelić - drums
- Milić Vukašinović - drums
- Vlado Pravdić - keyboards
- Laza Ristovski - keyboards

=== Additional personnel ===
- Neil Harrison - producer
- Ivan "Piko" Stančić - design
