= Gemerské Teplice =

Gemerské Teplice Jolsvatapolca
- Municipality
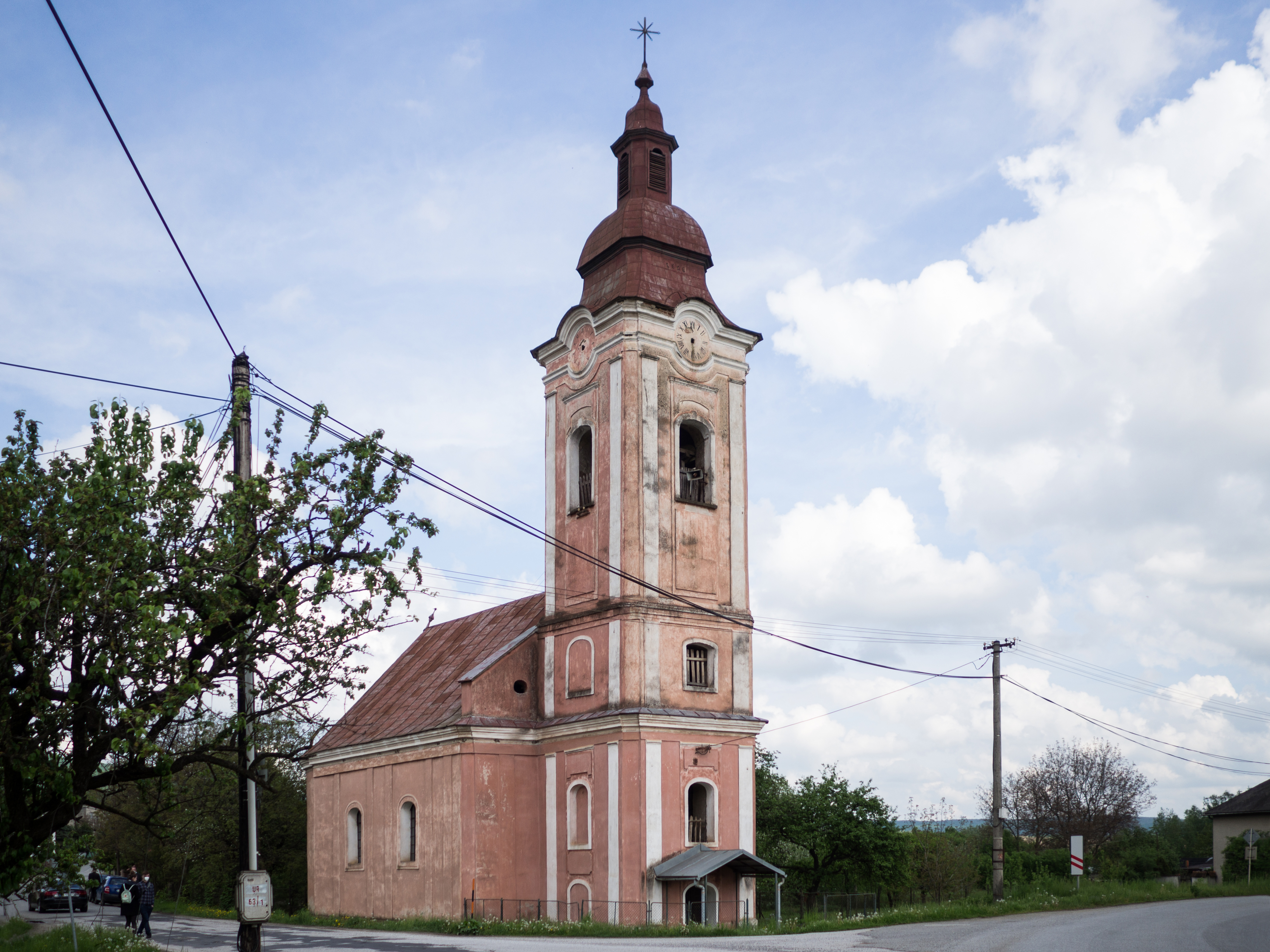

- Flag

- Location of Gemerské Teplice in the Banská Bystrica Region Location of Gemerské Teplice in Slovakia
- Coordinates: 48.60°N 20.29°E
- Country: Slovakia
- Region: Banská Bystrica Region
- District: Revúca District
- First mentioned: 1258

Area
  - Total: 12.71 km^{2} (4.91 sq mi)
- Elevation: 234 m (768 ft)

Population (2025)
  - Total: 359
- Time zone: UTC+1 (CET)
  - Summer (DST): UTC+2 (CEST)
- Postal code: 491 6
- Area code: +421 58
- Vehicle registration plate (until 2022): RA
- Website: gemerske-teplice.sk

Gemerské Teplice (Hungarian: Jolsvatapolca) is a village and municipality in Revúca District in the Banská Bystrica Region of Slovakia.

== Geography ==
The municipality lies at an altitude of 234 metres (768 ft) and covers an area of 12.71 km^{2} (4.91 sq mi) (2025).

== History ==
It arose in 1964 for the union of Gemerský Milhost' and Jelšavská Teplica in a unique Municipality. Gemerský Milhost' merged in the History in 1258 (1258 Polgla, 1383 Myglezpathuka, 1427 Myglizpataka). It belonged, in the order, to Zachy, Mèchy and Sáhgy noble families. In 1555 it was pillaged by Turks. Jelšavská Teplica, still, was first mentioned in 1258 (Thapolcha). In that time, it belonged to a certain Peter, Kačič Elias'son, and after to Jelšava and Muráň. It suffered because of Turks in 1556. From 1938 to 1945, both the villages were annexed by Hungary.

== Population ==
Population statistic (10 years)
Year	1995	2005	2015	2025
Count	371	395	378	359
Difference		+6.46%	−4.30%	−5.02%

Population statistic
Year	2024	2025
Count	370	359
Difference		−2.97%

It has a population of 359 people (31 December 2025).

=== Ethnicity ===
Census 2021 (1+ %)
Ethnicity	Number	Fraction
Slovak	333	91.23%
Not found out	34	9.31%
Romani	11	3.01%
Hungarian	10	2.73%
Total	365	

In year 2021 was 365 people by ethnicity 333 as Slovak, 34 as Not found out, 11 as Romani, 10 as Hungarian, 2 as Czech and 1 as Other.

Note on population: The difference values of population numbers in the table "Population statistic" and in the sections "Ethnicity" & "Religion" is caused by the use of various statistical methods.

=== Religion ===
Census 2021 (1+ %)
Religion	Number	Fraction
None	138	37.81%
Evangelical Church	135	36.99%
Roman Catholic Church	59	16.16%
Not found out	22	6.03%
Greek Catholic Church	6	1.64%
Total	365	

In year 2021 was 365 people by religion 138 from None, 135 from Evangelical Church, 59 from Roman Catholic Church, 22 from Not found out, 6 from Greek Catholic Church, 3 from Calvinist Church, 1 from Paganism and natural spirituality and 1 from Islam.

== Genealogical resources ==
The records for genealogical research are available at the state archive "Statny Archiv in Kosice, Slovakia"

- Roman Catholic church records (births/marriages/deaths): 1779-1898 (parish B)
- Greek Catholic church records (births/marriages/deaths): 1775-1928 (parish B)
- Lutheran church records (births/marriages/deaths): 1784-1913 (parish B)

== See also ==
- List of municipalities and towns in Slovakia
