= Chyžné =

Chyžné Hizsnyó
- Municipality
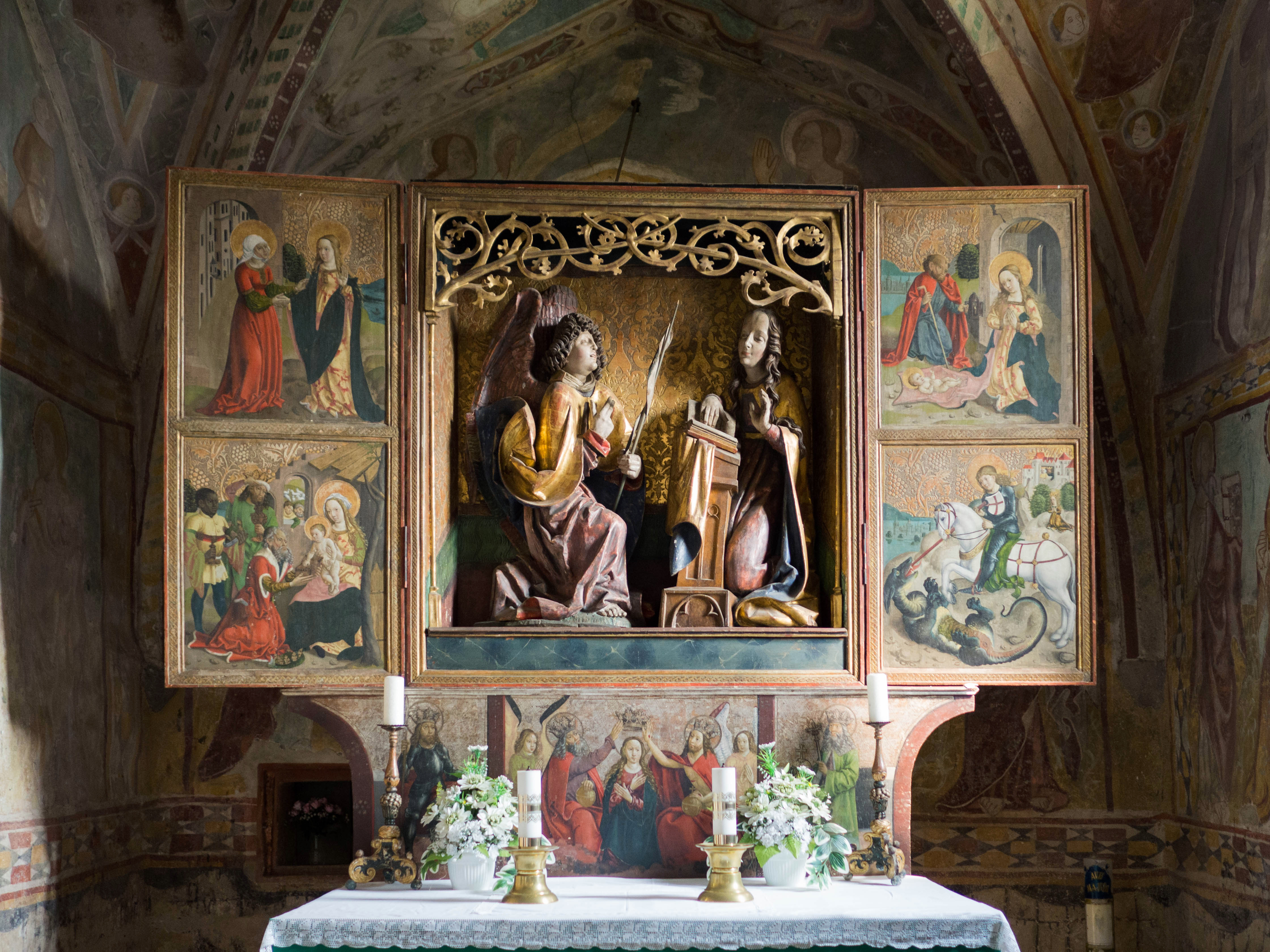
- Gothic altar by Master Paul of Levoča in Chyžné

- Flag

- Location of Chyžné in the Banská Bystrica Region Location of Chyžné in Slovakia
- Coordinates: 48.67°N 20.20°E
- Country: Slovakia
- Region: Banská Bystrica Region
- District: Revúca District
- First mentioned: 1427

Area
  - Total: 19.52 km^{2} (7.54 sq mi)
- Elevation: 296 m (971 ft)

Population (2025)
  - Total: 415
- Time zone: UTC+1 (CET)
  - Summer (DST): UTC+2 (CEST)
- Postal code: 491 8
- Area code: +421 58
- Vehicle registration plate (until 2022): RA
- Website: obecchyzne.sk

Chyžné (Hungarian: Hizsnyó) is a village and municipality in Revúca District in the Banská Bystrica Region of Slovakia.

== Geography ==
The municipality lies at an altitude of 296 metres (971 ft) and covers an area of 19.52 km^{2} (7.54 sq mi) (2025).

== History ==
In historical records, the village was first mentioned in 1427 (1427 Hyznow, 1551 Hysnyo, 1557 Chisno, 1575 Chysne, 1584 Kysnow). It belonged to Jelšava and after to Muráň. In 1566 it was destroyed by Turks.

== Population ==
Population statistic (10 years)
Year	1995	2005	2015	2025
Count	411	430	422	415
Difference		+4.62%	−1.86%	−1.65%

Population statistic
Year	2024	2025
Count	409	415
Difference		+1.46%

It has a population of 415 people (31 December 2025).

=== Ethnicity ===
Census 2021 (1+ %)
Ethnicity	Number	Fraction
Slovak	365	90.79%
Not found out	24	5.97%
Romani	23	5.72%
Hungarian	5	1.24%
Total	402	

In year 2021 was 402 people by ethnicity 365 as Slovak, 24 as Not found out, 23 as Romani, 5 as Hungarian, 2 as Czech and 1 as Russian.

Note on population: The difference values of population numbers in the table "Population statistic" and in the sections "Ethnicity" & "Religion" is caused by the use of various statistical methods.

=== Religion ===
Census 2021 (1+ %)
Religion	Number	Fraction
None	171	42.54%
Evangelical Church	124	30.85%
Roman Catholic Church	70	17.41%
Not found out	24	5.97%
Total	402	

In year 2021 was 402 people by religion 171 from None, 124 from Evangelical Church, 70 from Roman Catholic Church, 24 from Not found out, 3 from Seventh-day Adventist Church, 2 from Jehovah's Witnesses, 2 from Christian Congregations in Slovakia, 1 from Calvinist Church, 1 from Other, 1 from Hinduism, 1 from Greek Catholic Church, 1 from Buddhism and 1 from Baptists Church.

== Genealogical resources ==
The records for genealogical research are available at the state archive "Statny Archiv in Kosice, Slovakia"

- Roman Catholic church records (births/marriages/deaths): 1674-1895 (parish B)
- Lutheran church records (births/marriages/deaths): 1784-1897 (parish A)

== See also ==
- List of municipalities and towns in Slovakia
