= Vlado Dijak =

Vlado Dijak (1925 in Brezovo Polje, Brčko District, Kingdom of Yugoslavia – 1988 in Sarajevo, SR Bosnia and Herzegovina, SFR Yugoslavia) was a well-known Yugoslav Bosnian poet and songwriter.

== Biography ==
Dijak attended high school in Banja Luka. At the age of 17 he joined the Yugoslav Partisans. After World War II he studied literature for a brief period of time. He wrote for Banjalučke novine, and Radio Sarajevo. He was a prisoner on Goli Otok, where he was held as a political prisoner. He published books of poems Ambassador boema, Partizanske pjesme, Ljubičasti kišobran, as well as novels Kafana San, Topovi i slavuji, Crni konj. He was also a great humorist, and received the prize Zlatni Jež. Numbers of modern rock and pop performers used his lyrics. Most performed songs with lyrics written by Dijak were "Selma" (performed by Bijelo Dugme), "Stanica Podlugovi" (performed by Zdravko Čolić), "Čisti, bijeli snijeg" (performed by Arsen Dedić), "Betonska brana" (performed by Indexi), Kafana San (Prijatelji).
