= Smak discography =

- Studio albums: 10
- Extended plays: 2
- Live albums: 6
- Compilation albums: 8
- Singles: 8

The discography of the Serbian rock band Smak (Serbian Cyrillic: Смак; trans. Endtime), consists of ten studio albums, three live albums, five compilation albums, three EPs, and seven singles.

== Studio albums ==
Title	Released
Smak	1975
Crna dama	1977
Black Lady	1978
Stranice našeg vremena	1978
Dab in the Middle	1978
Rok cirkus	1980
Zašto ne volim sneg	1981
Smak 86.	1986
Bioskop Fox	1995
Egregor	1999

== EPs ==
Title	Released
Satelit	1976
Delfin	2012

== Live albums ==
Title	Released
odLIVEno	1992
Live Without Audience	1997
Uživo! Zaječarska Gitarijada 2001	2001
Live - klub La Cinema	2002
Prvih 50 godina - Live Kragujevac 2022	2023
Beograd Ušće	2024

== Compilation albums ==
Title	Released
Plava pesma/Ulazak u harem	1977
Smak: Retrospektiva	1992
Star? Mlad. Večan?	1996
The Best Of	1996
Istorija	2001
Antologija!	2005
The Best Of	2012
Za sva vremena	2012

== Singles ==
Title	Released
"Živim... Biska 13" / "Biska 16"	1975
"Ulazak u harem" / "Sto ptica"	1975
"Ulazak u harem" / "Epitaf	1975
"Ljudi nije fer" / "El dumo"	1976
"Crna dama" / "Plava pesma"	1977
"Alo" / "Daire"	1977
Smak Super 45	1978
"Na Balkanu" / "Gore-dole"	1979
"Rock cirkus" / "Hirošima"	1980
