= Rock Express Top 100 Yugoslav Rock Songs of All Times =

Music ranking list by Rock Express

100 najboljih pesama svih vremena YU rocka (Top 100 Yugoslav Rock Songs of All Times) was a list compiled by the Serbian music magazine Rock Express. In 1999, Rock Express started the poll for the selection of top 100 Yugoslav rock songs. The whole list was published in the 25th issue of Rock Express, in 2000. The list contains rock music songs from the Socialist Federal Republic of Yugoslavia and the songs from successor states.

== The list ==
#	Song	Artist	Album	Year
1	"Pogledaj dom svoj, anđele"	Riblja Čorba	Istina	1985
2	"Dva dinara, druže"	Riblja Čorba	Pokvarena mašta i prljave strasti	1981
3	"Krug"	Ekatarina Velika	Samo par godina za nas	1989
4	"Za koji život treba da se rodim"	Time	Time	1972
5	"Crna dama"	Smak	Crna dama	1977
6	"Neko te ima"	Van Gogh	Svet je moj	1991
7	"A šta da radim"	Azra	Non-album single	1979
8	"Niko kao ja"	Šarlo Akrobata	Paket aranžman	1980
9	"Igra rock 'n' roll cela Jugoslavija"	Električni Orgazam	Letim, sanjam, dišem	1988
10	"Lipe cvatu, sve je isto ko i lani"	Bijelo Dugme	Bijelo Dugme	1984
11	"Par godina za nas"	Ekatarina Velika	Samo par godina za nas	1989
12	"Ulazak u harem"	Smak	Non-album single	1975
13	"Hoću da znam"	Partibrejkers	Kiselo i slatko	1994
14	"Bitanga i princeza"	Bijelo Dugme	Bitanga i princeza	1979
15	"Treba imat dušu"	Atomsko Sklonište	Mentalna higijena	1982
16	"Balkan"	Azra	Non-album single	1979
17	"Sve će to, o, mila moja, prekriti ruzmarin, snjegovi i šaš"	Bijelo Dugme	Bitanga i princeza	1979
18	"Crni leptir"	YU Grupa	YU Grupa	1973
19	"Bacila je sve niz rijeku"	Indexi	Non-album single	1974
20	"Uči me, majko, karaj me"	Leb i Sol	Anthology	1995
21	"1000 godina"	Partibrejkers	Partibrejkers I	1985
22	"Sve još miriše na nju"	Parni Valjak	Buđenje	1993
23	"Daire"	Smak	Crna dama	1977
24	"Put beznađa"	Ritam Nereda	Breaking	1993
25	"Ostani đubre do kraja"	Riblja Čorba	Kost u grlu	1979
26	"Šejn"	Haustor	Bolero	1985
27	"Slušaj 'vamo"	Rimtutituki	Non-album single	1992
28	"Nedjelja kad je otiš'o Hase"	Zabranjeno Pušenje	Dok čekaš sabah sa šejtanom	1985
29	"Da li znaš da te volim"	Time	Time II	1975
30	"Ne cvikaj, generacijo"	Atomsko Sklonište	Ne cvikaj, generacijo	1978
31	"Sanjao sam noćas da te nemam"	Bijelo Dugme	Eto! Baš hoću!	1976
32	"Maljčiki"	Idoli	Paket aranžman	1980
33	"Kosovski božuri"	YU Grupa	YU zlato	1972
34	"Molitva"	Partibrejkers	Kiselo i slatko	1994
35	"Lutka sa naslovne strane"	Riblja Čorba	Non-album single	1978
36	"Mi nismo sami"	Film	Sva čuda svijeta	1983
37	"Lijepe žene prolaze kroz grad"	Azra	Non-album single	1980
38	"Ima neka tajna veza"	Bijelo Dugme	Non-album single	1975
39	"Bolje da nosim kratku kosu"	Pekinška Patka	Plitka poezija	1980
40	"Klatno"	Van Gogh	Hodi	1996
41	"Ti si sav moj bol"	Ekatarina Velika	S' vetrom uz lice	1986
42	"Nebo"	Električni Orgazam	Električni Orgazam	1981
43	"Seobe"	Kerber	Seobe	1986
44	"Put za istok"	Korni Grupa	Korni Grupa	1972
45	"Jovano, Jovanke"	Leb i Sol	Zvučni zid	1986
46	"Rock 'n' roll u Beogradu"	Time	Život u čizmama s visokom petom	1975
47	"Blues u parku"	Smak	Smak	1975
48	"Jesen u meni"	Parni Valjak	Anđeli se dosađuju?	1987
49	"Mi plešemo"	Prljavo Kazalište	Crno-bijeli svijet	1981
50	"Čudna šuma"	YU Grupa	YU Grupa	1973
51	"Usne vrele višnje"	Branimir Štulić	Balegari ne vjeruju sreći	1990
52	"Mama"	Van Gogh	Strast	1993
53	"Dolazim za 5 minuta"	Generacija 5	Generacija 5	1980
54	"Zemlja"	Ekatarina Velika	Ljubav	1987
55	"Kenozoik"	Idoli	Odbrana i poslednji dani	1982
56	"Jutro će promijeniti sve"	Indexi	Non-album single	1969
57	"Stranica dnevnika"	Parni Valjak	Gradske priče	1979
58	"Ramona"	Psihomodo Pop	Godina zmaja	1988
59	"Magla"	Josipa Lisac	Hir, Hir, Hir	1980
60	"Osveta"	YU Grupa	YU Grupa	1975
61	"Makedonija"	Time	Non-album single	1973
62	"Ona se budi"	Šarlo Akrobata	Paket Aranžman	1980
63	"Moja prva ljubav"	Haustor	Haustor	1981
64	"Rock 'n' Roll za kućni savet"	Riblja Čorba	Kost u grlu	1979
65	"Šumadijski blues"	Smak	Satelit (EP)	1976
66	"Kreni prema meni"	Partibrejkers	Partibrejkers III	1989
67	"Jedna žena"	Korni Grupa	Non-album single	1973
68	"Šta bi dao da si na mom mjestu"	Bijelo Dugme	Šta bi dao da si na mom mjestu	1976
69	"Slovenska"	Đorđe Balašević	003	1985
70	"Zažmuri"	Bajaga i Instruktori	Sa druge strane jastuka	1985
71	"Kao ti i ja"	Azra	Filigranski pločnici	1982
72	"Balada o Pišonji i Žugi"	Zabranjeno Pušenje	Pozdrav iz zemlje Safari	1987
73	"Gracija"	Azra	Azra	1980
74	"Crno-bijeli svijet"	Prljavo Kazalište	Crno-bijeli svijet	1981
75	"Bolje biti pijan nego star"	Plavi Orkestar	Soldatski bal	1985
76	"Kad padne noć (Upomoć)"	Riblja Čorba	Ujed za dušu	1987
77	"Ma kog me Boga za tebe pitaju"	Prljavo Kazalište	Zlatne godine	1985
78	"Za Esmu"	Bijelo Dugme	Bijelo Dugme	1984
79	"Bistra voda"	Leb i Sol	Kalabalak	1983
80	"Pomorac sam, majko"	Atomsko Sklonište	Ne cvikaj, generacijo	1978
81	"Zajedno"	Film	Non-album single	1980
82	"Zajdi, zajdi"	Smak	Zašto ne volim sneg	1981
83	"Istina mašina"	Time	Time	1972
84	"Kao ptica na mom dlanu"	Piloti	Kao ptica na mom dlanu	1987
85	"Hvala ti"	Parni Valjak	Vruće igre	1980
86	"7 dana"	Ekatarina Velika	Ljubav	1987
87	"Fratello"	Aerodrom	Dukat i pribadače	1984
88	"Buka u modi"	Disciplina Kičme	Nova iznenađenja za nova pokolenja	1991
89	"Jedina moja"	Divlje Jagode	Divlje Jagode	1979
90	"Sa tvojih usana"	Crvena Jabuka	Crvena Jabuka	1986
91	"Novo vrijeme"	Buldožer	Živi bili pa vidjeli	1979
92	"Put ka Suncu"	Pop Mašina	Put ka Suncu	1976
93	"Marina"	Prljavo Kazalište	Zaustavite Zemlju	1988
94	"Satelit"	Smak	Satelit (EP)	1976
95	"Doktor za rock and roll"	Vatreni Poljubac	Non-album single	1978
96	"Plima"	Indexi	Non-album single	1973
97	"Kad bi bio bijelo dugme"	Bijelo Dugme	Kad bi bio bijelo dugme	1974
98	"Gvendolina, kdo je bil?"	Srce	Non-album single	1972
99	"Dule Savić"	Prljavi Inspektor Blaža i Kljunovi	Plagijati i obrade	1996
100	"Manastir"	Block Out	Godina sirotinjske zabave	1996

== Voting ==
Every voter chose five songs, each of them receiving a vote.

=== Audience ===
More than 3400 readers took a part in the poll. Readers from FR Yugoslavia and other SFR Yugoslavia successor states, as well as from other countries took a part in the poll.

=== Journalists ===
120 journalists and music critics from FR Yugoslav media took a part in the poll.

=== Musicians ===
100 musicians took a part in the poll. Although the names of the musicians were not stated, it was stated that former and current members of Riblja Čorba, Bijelo Dugme, Smak, YU Grupa, Leb i Sol, Vatreni Poljubac, Indijanci, Zbogom Brus Li, Čovek Bez Sluha, Atheist Rap, Kerber, Prljavi Inspektor Blaža i Kljunovi, Sunshine, Oktobar 1864, Goblini, Lutajuća Srca, Novembar, Galija, Siluete and other bands voted.

== Statistics ==
=== Bands with the most songs ===
- 8 Bijelo Dugme
- 7 Smak
- 6 Riblja Čorba
- 6 Azra
- 5 Ekatarina Velika
- 5 Time
- 4 Partibrejkers
- 4 YU Grupa
- 4 Parni Valjak
- 4 Prljavo Kazalište

=== Bands by the number of songs that appeared in the voting ===
- 23 Riblja Čorba (6 of them on the list)
- 19 Smak (7 of them on the list)
- 18 Bijelo Dugme (8 of them on the list)
- 16 Azra (6 of them on the list)
- 16 Ekatarina Velika (5 of them on the list)
- 12 Leb i Sol (3 of them on the list)
- 10 Partibrejkers (4 of them on the list)
- 8 Van Gogh (3 of them on the list)
- 7 KUD Idijoti (0 of them on the list)
- 6 Time (5 of them on the list)
- 6 Sunshine (0 of them on the list)
- 5 Indexi (3 of them on the list)
- 5 Zabranjeno Pušenje (2 of them on the list)
- 5 Korni Grupa (2 of them on the list)
- 5 Film (2 of them on the list)
- 5 Šarlo Akrobata (2 of them on the list)
- 5 Bajaga i Instruktori (1 of them on the list)
- 5 Kerber (1 of them on the list)

== See also ==
- YU 100: najbolji albumi jugoslovenske rok i pop muzike
- Kako (ni)je propao rokenrol u Srbiji
- B92 Top 100 Domestic Songs
