= Laza Ristovski =

Background information
- Born: Lazar Ristovski; 23 January 1956; Novi Pazar, PR Serbia, FPR Yugoslavia
- Died: 6 October 2007 (aged 51) Belgrade, Serbia
- Genres: Rock, progressive rock, hard rock, folk rock, instrumental rock, electronic, classical, new-age music
- Occupations: Musician, composer
- Instruments: Electronic organ, synthesizer, piano
- Years active: 1970 – 2007
- Labels: Beograd Disk, PGP-RTB, Tring, ITMM, Komuna, PGP-RTS, Hi-Fi Centar, Goraton

Lazar "Laza" Ristovski (Serbian Cyrillic: Лаза Ристовски, pronounced [lǎːza ristǒʋskiː]; 23 January 1956 – 6 October 2007) was a Serbian and former Yugoslav keyboardist, known for being a member of rock bands Smak and Bijelo Dugme, as well as for his eclectic solo work that spanned many different musical genres.

== Biography ==
=== Early life ===
Lazar Ristovski was born in Novi Pazar, as his father, a Yugoslav People's Army officer, was stationed there at the time. When Ristovski was two years old, the family moved to Kraljevo, which is where he grew up.

=== Early career (1970–1974) ===
Ristovski formed his first band, Bezimeni (The Nameless), when he was fourteen. The band made only one recording, the song "Maštarenje", which was released on various artists album Veče uz radio (Evening by the Radio) in 1975. In the summer of 1974, Bezimeni performed in Bečići, where a well-known clarinetist Boki Milošević heard their performance. After Milošević's invitation, Ristovski moved to Belgrade and became a member of Milošević's orchestra.

=== Smak (1975–1976) ===
During the autumn of 1974, Ristovski started performing with Kragujevac-based progressive rock band Smak, but became their official member as of January 1975. With Smak he recorded their debut self-titled album (1975), the EP Satelit (Satellite, 1976), Radomir Mihajlović's first solo album, R. M. Točak (1976), and several singles.

=== Bijelo Dugme, Laza i Ipe (1976–1978) ===
In October 1976, Ristovski was persuaded by Goran Bregović to join Sarajevo-based hard rock band Bijelo Dugme as the band was getting ready to start recording their third studio album Eto! Baš hoću! (There! I Will!). Ristovski was a replacement for their regular keyboardist Vlado Pravdić, who had to serve the mandatory army stint. With Bijelo Dugme he recorded the album Eto! Baš hoću! (1976) and the live album Koncert kod Hajdučke česme (1977).

As Bregović left for his own army stint in November 1977, thus putting the band on hiatus, Ristovski and Ivandić decided to start working on a side project. Naming their act Laza & Ipe, they recorded the symphonic rock-oriented album entitled Stižemo (Here We Come) in London during February and March 1978. The album, featuring lyrics by Ranko Boban, was recorded in London with Leb i Sol leader Vlatko Stefanovski on guitar, Zlatko Hold on bass guitar, and Goran Kovačević and Ivandić's sister Gordana on vocals. The album was well received by the critics, and Ristovski and Ivandić decided to leave Bijelo Dugme.

On 10 September, the same day for which the beginning of the promotional tour was scheduled, Ivandić, Kovačević and Boban were arrested for owning hashish, which ended Laza & Ipe activity. At the beginning of 1978, Ristovski worked with the band Vatra, but eventually returned to Smak in late 1978.

=== Back to Smak, the beginning of solo career (1978–1981) ===
In 1980, Ristovski recorded the album Rok cirkus (Rock Circus) with Smak. During the same year, Ristovski released his debut solo release, a 7-inch single with the songs "Tražiš oproštaj" ("You Seek Forgiveness") and "Andželika" ("Angelica"), both composed by Tugomir Vidanović. Members of Mama Co Co and Vatra were involved in the single recording.

In 1981, he recorded another album with Smak, Zašto ne volim sneg (Why I Don't Like the Snow), however, the band disbanded shortly after the album release. After Smak disbanded, Ristovski took part in the recording of Smak former vocalist Boris Aranđelović's solo album Iz profila (1982).

=== Solo career (1982–1985) ===
Ristovski's debut solo album Merge was released in 1982, and became the best-selling instrumental music album in Yugoslavia 1983. Until his return to Bijelo Dugme in 1985, he released three more solo albums: 2/3 (1983), Roses for a General (1984) and Vojnički dani (Army Days, 1984). The latter featured instrumental versions of Yugoslav revolutionary songs.

=== Back to Bijelo Dugme (1985–1989) ===
He returned to Bijelo Dugme in 1985. From 1985 to 1989, both Ristovski and Vlado Pravdić were the members of the band, Ristovski usually playing various keyboards and synthesizers, while Vlado Pravdić played the organ.

Ristovski stayed in Bijelo Dugme until the band broke up in 1989, releasing the studio albums Pljuni i zapjevaj moja Jugoslavijo (Spit and Sing, My Yugoslavia, 1986) and Ćiribiribela (1988) and the live album Mramor, kamen i željezo (Marble, Stone and Iron, 1987) with the band. During this period, he also recorded the album Opera (1986) with percussionist Nenad Jelić.

=== Osvajači, Smak reunion (1990–1992) ===
In 1990, Ristovski became a joined member of the heavy metal band Osvajači, playing keyboards on and producing their debut album Krv i led (Blood and Ice, 1990).

In 1992, Ristovski took part in Smak reunion, performing with them on one Kragujevac and three Belgrade concerts, the first Belgrade concert resulting in a live album OdLIVEno (LIVEquefied, 1992). After the Belgrade concerts, the band, despite the plans for recording a studio album, disbanded.

=== Solo career, Bijelo Dugme reunion (1993–2007) ===
In 1993, Ristovski released his first solo album since 1986, Quit. In 1994, he recorded well-received album Naos (Nave) with Bajaga i Instruktori keyboardist Saša Lokner. Some of the songs on Naos were inspired by Orthodox spiritual music. In 2003, he released the album Gondola, and in 2006, the album Laza Ristovski Plays Simon & Garfunkel, featuring instrumental versions of Simon & Garfunkel songs.

Despite using a wheelchair due to multiple sclerosis, Ristovski took part in three Bijelo Dugme reunion shows (in Sarajevo, Zagreb, and Belgrade) during June 2005. The shows resulted in a live album Turneja 2005 - Sarajevo, Zagreb, Beograd (Tour 2005 - Sarajevo, Zagreb, Belgrade, 2005).

=== Death and legacies ===
Ristovski died in Belgrade on 6 October 2007 following a long battle with multiple sclerosis.

After his death, a posthumous album Drvo života (Tree of Life) was released in 2008. The album, on which Ristovski worked before his death, featured guest appearances by Dragi Jelić, Tijana Dapčević, Nikola Čuturilo, members of Del Arno Band, Igor Lazić, Dado Topić, Saša Ranđelović, and others. In 2008, PGP-RTS released two compilation albums, one featuring Merge and 2/3, and the other featuring Vojnički dani and Roses for a General in their entirety.

In March 2016, a documentary about Ristovski was announced. The documentary will be directed by Ivan Grlić. On November 9, 2016, in Belgrade's Sava Centar a concert entitled Iza horizonta was held, honoring Ristovski. The concert featured performances by Ristovski's former bandmates, collaborators and friends: Radomir Mihajlović "Točak" and Slobodan Stojanović "Kepa" (of Smak), Alen Islamović, Goran Bregović, Kiki Lesendrić & Piloti, Zana, Saša Lokner, Vasil Hadžimanov, Bilja Kristić & Bistrik, Neverne Bebe, Ognjen Radivojević, Kornelije Kovač, Nikola Čuturilo, Pera Joe, Bata Kostić, Dragan "Krle" Jovanović (of Generacija 5) and others. The concert also featured appearance by the actor Lazar Ristovski.

== Collaborations ==
Ristovski played on more than thousand albums of rock, jazz and folk music. He played keyboards on albums by Slađana Milošević, Zana, Oliver Mandić, Raša Đelmaš, Dušan Prelević, Vatreni Poljubac, Rajko Kojić, Bilja Krstić, Željko Bebek, Milić Vukašinović, Leb i Sol, Aska, Seid Memić, Aerodrom, Boris Novković, Viktorija, Jura Stublić & Film, Nikola Čuturilo, Piloti, Bebi Dol, Galija, Balkan, Vlado Janevski among others.

During his career Ristovski worked with international stars like Falco and Richard Palmer-James. At the beginning of the 1980s, Ristovski was a member of Alvin Lee Band and played on their Yugoslav and Hungarian tour. Ristovski also worked with RTB Jazz Orchestra.

== Film music ==
Ristovski wrote music for the films Lazar (1984), Zaboravljeni (1988), Hajde da se volimo 2 (1989), Violinski ključ (1990), Pokojnik (1990), A Holy Place (1990), Hajde da se volimo 3 (1990), Velika frka (1992), Mrav pešadinac (1993), Napadač (1993), Osmeh Margaret Jursenar (1993), Obračun u kazino kabareu (1993), Pretty Village, Pretty Flame (1996), and Impure Blood (1997). The music from Impure Blood was released on the album Muzika iz filma Nečista krv (1997). He was one of Goran Bregović's closest associates on Bregović's early movie soundtrack projects.

== Accolades ==
Ristovski was voted the best Yugoslav keyboardist for eleven years in a row by Yugoslav music magazines. On the 1984 film festival in Sopot Ristovski was awarded for the Lazar movie soundtrack. He also won the Golden Medal on the 36th and the 39th animated movie festival in Belgrade. In 1986, he was awarded with Estradna nagrada Srbije.

== Discography ==
=== With Smak ===
==== Studio albums ====
- 1975 - Smak
- 1980 - Rock cirkus
- 1981 - Zašto ne volim sneg

==== Extended plays ====
- 1976 - Satelit

==== Live albums ====
- 1992 - "odLIVEno"

==== Compilation albums ====
- 1977 - Ulazak u Harem / Plava pesma
- 1992 - Smak: Retrospektiva
- 1995 - The Best of Smak
- 1996 - Star? Mlad. Večan?
- 2001 - Istorija
- 2008 - The Best of Smak

==== Singles ====
- 1975 - "Ulazak u harem" / "Sto ptica"
- 1975 - "Ulazak u harem" / "Epitaf"
- 1976 - "Ljudi nije fer" / "El dumo"
- 1979 - Smak Super 45
- 1980 - "Rock cirkus" / "Hirošima"

=== with Bijelo Dugme ===
==== Studio albums ====
- 1976 - Eto! Baš hoću!
- 1986 - Pljuni i zapjevaj moja Jugoslavijo
- 1988 - Ćiribiribela

==== Live albums ====
- 1978 - Koncert kod Hajdučke česme
- 1988 - Mramor, kamen i željezo
- 2005 - Turneja 2005 - Sarajevo, Zagreb, Beograd

=== Solo ===
==== Studio albums ====
- 1978 - Stižemo (with Ipe Ivandić)
- 1982 - Merge
- 1983 - 2/3
- 1984 - Vojnički dani
- 1984 - Roses for a General
- 1985 - Opera (with Nenad Jelić)
- 1993 - Quit
- 1994 - Naos (with Saša Lokner)
- 1997 - Muzika iz filma Nečista krv
- 2003 - Gondola
- 2006 - Laza Ristovski Plays Simon & Garfunkel

==== Posthumous studio albums ====
- 2008 - Drvo života

==== Compilation albums ====
- 1997 - Svetlost u A-duru (Antologija)
- 2000 - The Best Of Instrumental Works
- 2000 - Platinum
- 2008 - Merge + 2/3
- 2008 - Vojnički Dani + Roses For A General

==== Singles ====
- 1980 - "Tražiš oproštaj" / "Andželika"
