= Smak =

Serbian rock band

- Smak in 1975: Laza Ristovski, Slobodan "Kepa" Stojanović, Radomir "Točak" Mihailović, Zoran Milanović, and Boris Aranđelović.

Background information
- Origin: Kragujevac, Serbia
- Genres: Progressive rock; jazz rock; blues rock; folk rock; symphonic rock; psychedelic rock; hard rock
- Years active: 1971–1981; 1986–1992; 1994–2002; 2010–2015; 2022–present
- Labels: PGP-RTB; Suzy; ZKP RTLJ; Bellaphon; Fantasy; RCA; Sorabia Disk; Vans; Komuna; A; Razglas; PGP-RTS; Active Time; One
- Members: see the members section

Smak (Serbian Cyrillic: Смак; trans. The end time) is a Serbian (formerly Yugoslav) band formed in Kragujevac in 1971. The group reached the peak of popularity in the 1970s when it was one of the most notable acts of the Yugoslav rock scene. The band's leader, guitarist Radomir Mihailović, nicknamed Točak ("The Wheel"), is considered one of the most influential guitarists on the Yugoslav rock scene.

Formed in 1971 by the guitarist Radomir "Točak" Mihajlović and drummer Slobodan "Kepa" Stojanović, the band did not get a stable lineup until 1975 by which time bassist Zoran Milanović, vocalist Boris Aranđelović and keyboard player Laza Ristovski became the band's official members. However, after recording their eponymous debut album, Ristovski left and the remaining quartet recorded their subsequent albums with various keyboardists before disbanding in 1981.

After brief reunions between 1986 and 1992, the two founding members, Mihajlović and Stojanović, reestablished the band with younger musicians — vocalist Dejan "Najda" Najdanović, the second drummer Dejan "Kepa Jr." Stojanović, second guitarist Milan "Mikica" Milosavljević and bassist Vlada Samardžić. During the late 1990, the latter was replaced by the bassist Slobodan "Sale" Marković who performed with the band until 2002 when Smak disbanded once again. The remaining members from the last lineup, with the new bassist Miloš Petrović reunited in 2010, and in 2012 the default lineup of the band made a one-off reunion.

== History ==
=== Formation and early career (1971–1975) ===
Two ambitious twenty-year-old budding musicians—guitarist Radomir "Točak" Mihailović and drummer Slobodan "Kepa" Stojanović—met up in Stojanović's hometown Kraljevo on 23 April 1971 with a view of starting a band together. They had earlier been put in touch with one another through Mihailović's childhood friend Predrag "Biska" Albić who had served his mandatory Yugoslav People's Army (JNA) service in Mostar with a group of conscripts that included Stojanović. Throughout their army stint together, Albić kept telling Stojanović about Mihailović's exceptional guitar-playing skills and passion for rock'n'roll, eventually arranging for the two to meet. Following the introductory meeting in Kraljevo, the two musicians returned to their lives as Stojanović had already been set to go on a tour with his family orchestra—an engagement he envisioned as an opportunity to earn enough money for a new drum kit—while Mihailović went back to his hometown Čačak.

Upon getting back home, Mihailović was introduced to Zoran Milanović (bass guitar) and Slobodan "Koma" Kominac (vocals), both from Kragujevac, who asked him to join their upstart progressive rock band Gentry, an offer he accepted on condition that Stojanović become the band's drummer. During November 1971, the four met up in Kraljevo in order to officially form a band and, having been kicked out of Stojanović's family home by his grandmother who didn't appreciate the sight of four young men with long hair in her house, they went to a local restaurant and eventually to a nearby park where they wrote their first song, later named "Bluz u parku" ("Blues in the Park") in memory of the event.

In December 1971, the lineup was completed with the arrival of Miša Nikolić on organ. Still largely a cover band at this point, the group played youth dance halls with covers of Santana, Deep Purple, Led Zeppelin, The Rolling Stones, and Jimi Hendrix. Soon after, the members decided to change the band's name. Influenced by Smak sveta (The End of the World), a Hair-inspired musical being prepared locally at the Kragujevac Theatre in dedication to the schoolchildren killed during the Kragujevac massacre, they agreed on Smak (Endtime) as their new name while the play eventually never got staged. New name Smak occasionally got referred to in jest as S.M.A.K., a supposed acronym for Samostalni Muzički Ansambl Kragujevac (Independent Musical Ensemble Kragujevac). During this period, the band members spent time writing their own material, including 22 instrumental songs — from "Biska 2" to "Biska 23", written by Mihailović as a dedication to his friend Predrag "Biska" Albić (who was 22 at the time), featuring the defined band's sound as a combination of progressive rock with jazz and blues influences.

The fact that the band's improvisations turned dances into rock concerts was the reason why their performances were becoming less popular, which eventually led vocalist Kominac to leave the band, being replaced by Slobodan "Johan" Jovanović, Mihailović's friend from Čačak. However, since the performances were the source of income for the band members, they all agreed to reunite with Kominac and go to Dubrovnik where they would perform mostly blues repertoire for two and a half months during the summer of 1972. During their stay in Dubrovnik, the band opened for Time, which had borrowed their equipment for the performance. After the Dubrovnik performances the band took a break until March 1973 when, with the new vocalist Milorad "Kimi" Petrović, Stojanović's former bandmate from the band Bluz Projekcija, Stojanović, Mihailović and Milanović decided to perform at the Požarevac Gitarijada Festival (not to be confused with Zaječar Gitarijada Festival). There, in April 1973, the band shared the first place with the local band Dijamanti, which organized the festival.

With yet another return of Kominac to the band, Smak continued performing in Kragujevac clubs, as well as making a successful appearance at the Pop Music Festival in Sanad. This lineup recorded the song "Biska II blues", which appeared on the PGP RTB various artists compilation Leteća diskoteka (Flying Discothèque), compiled by Zoran Modli in 1977. In October 1973, the musically inexperienced high tenor vocalist Boris Aranđelović, who had just returned from Australia, joined the band after auditioning with a successful performance of Deep Purple's "Child in Time". After Aranđelović's arrival, during the early 1974, the band started recording their debut single and were interested in bringing an organist into the band, offering the place to Time member Tihomir "Pop" Asanović, who turned down the offer due to his plans to form his Jugoslovenska Pop Selekcija. Eventually, the band released their debut single "Živim ja" (I'm Livin'), originally entitled "Biska 13", with "Biska 16" as the B-side, in March 1974 through PGP-RTB. "Živim ja" featured the flutist Sreten Tasić "Tasa", at the time member of the band Oliver, who by chance turned up at the studio during the recording session. During the late 1974, "Živim ja" was selected as the hit single of the year on the Veče uz radio (An Evening With the Radio) Radio Belgrade show.

Smak performed in Belgrade for the first time on November 10, 1974, during the Veče uz radio anniversary concert, alongside Bijelo Dugme, Pop Mašina and other notable bands of the time. Several days later, the band performed at the University of Belgrade Faculty of Philology, the first time with a guest keyboard player Laza Ristovski, a former Bezimeni and Boki Milošević Orchestra member. Ristovski officially became a member in January 1975, soon after which, Smak performed with the Hungarian band Omega in the Dom Sindikata Hall. In February of the same year, the band performed at the Rock Evening of Opatija Festival, and afterwards in Zagreb at the Kongres rock majstora (The Rock Masters Congress) concert held as the summit of the best Yugoslav guitar players. Unlike the expectation that Mihajlović would be declared the best guitarist of the event, the judges decided that the best four guitarists were Bata Kostić of YU grupa, Vedran Božić of Time, Josip Boček formerly of Korni Grupa, and Goran Bregović of Bijelo Dugme, all of whom, unlike Mihailović, were signed to Jugoton, the event's principal organizer. Shortly after, on March 16, 1975, Smak opened for the Deep Purple concert in Belgrade, performing three of their numbers: "Put od balona" (Road Made of Balloons), "Šumadijski blues" (Šumadijan Blues) and "Ulazak u harem" (Entry into the Harem).

After the performance at the Od glave do pete (From Head to Heels) television show where the band performed the instrumental "Ulazak u harem", originally composed by Točak's teacher, Dragoljub "Jarak" Jaraković but rearranged by Točak, owing to positive reactions, they decided to record the track as their follow-up single. In April 1975, the band signed the Ljubljana ZKP RTLJ and released the single "Ulazak u harem" with the track "Epitaf" ("Epitaph") as the B-side. However, after being offered the contract by the Zagreb Suzy Records to release the single through their label, the band signed yet another contract, releasing "Ulazak u harem" with the song "Sto ptica" ("A Hundred Birds") as the B-side, which resulted in the two labels simultaneously releasing the same single. The release of the singles became the first major music controversy in the history of Yugoslav music. Eventually the band chose to remain with the ZKP RTLJ label and were offered to record their debut album for the label. The following month, the band went on a Bosnian and Croatian tour with Bijelo Dugme and the East German band Puhdys, and had several live appearances with the Hungarian band Sirius and Austrian band Gypsy Love, followed by them headlining the Zagreb BOOM Festival.

=== Commercial success (1975–1978) ===
Smak's eponymous debut album, Smak (Endtime), was released in 1975 and featured five tracks: the A-side featured "Perle" (Beads), "Mračni mol" (The Dark Minor), "Blues u parku" (Blues in the Park) and the shortened "Biska 2", whereas the B-side featured the twenty-minute long instrumental "Put od balona" ("The Road Made of Balloons"), originally entitled "Biska 20". Despite its length, the latter track was recorded in a single take and was inspired by the Korni Grupa symphonic rock tracks such as "Prvo svetlo u kući broj 4" (First Light in the House Number 4) and "Jedna žena" (A Woman). The album featured the lyrics mostly written by Mihajlović, but shortly after, the band asked the services of the poet Mirko Glišić from Kragujevac for the same occupation, with whom they collaborated on their subsequent releases. The album received mixed to favorable critics, but nevertheless went silver, being sold in about twenty thousand copies. The album had also increased the cult status of Mihajlović's guitar playing, which was confirmed on their three-week tour of East Germany.

In April 1976 the band released the double 7" EP Satelit (Satellite), featuring the title track which became an instant hit, and had a cover which in its inner side had a satellite jumping out of the sleeves. The promotion of the EP was also organized in an unusual manner: the Ljubljana's ZKP RTLJ record label invited about twenty journalists to a DC10 flight from Belgrade to New York City during which the band performed an improvised session on the plane. They stayed in New York City for a week, recording a promotional video for "Satelit", a documentary about their visit, and performed in a club for expatriates from Banat. Upon their return from the United States, Mihajlović released his debut solo album R. M. Točak, and the band had a mini-tour of Yugoslavia during the Autumn of 1976. In October the band released the single with songs "Ljudi nije fer" (People, It's Not Fair!) with the B-side "El dumo", and as a part of the single promotion, a one-hour documentary about the band's stay in New York was screened. The following month, Laza Ristovski left Smak to join Bijelo Dugme, at the time Smak's rivals, being replaced by the organist Miki Petkovski from the band Breg (the embryonic Leb i Sol), a cello music academy graduate in the class of professor André Navarra.

During the early 1977, the band, Ristovski's departure and Mihailović's illness started preparing material for the following album, with Petkovski also bringing his cello to the rehearsals, and the written material was recorded in London at the Morgan Studios. Crna dama (Black Lady), produced by Martin Levan, featured the lyrics written by Mirko Glišić and the music by Mihajlović, with the exception for "Tegoba" (Ailment), written by Petkovski, in which he presented his sympathies for jazz rock. The musical style ranged from the hard rock influenced title track, ballads "Stvar ljubavi" (A Matter of Love) and "Plava pesma" (Blue Song), featuring the London Harmonium string quartet, folk rock "Daire" (Tambourine), the progressive "'Alo", featuring Aranđelović's scat singing combined with Mihajlović's solo parts, and "Domaći zadatak" (Homework), featuring complex solos on drums, bass guitar and keyboards, which was directly dedicated to Bijelo Dugme. The album had a luxurious cover designed by Dragan S. Stefanović, featuring a new band logo which became one of the band's trademarks.

The album went gold and received mostly positive critics, although Glišić's lyrics received mostly negative reactions, being described as banal and ineffective. PGP RTB had also made a great investment in the album promotion, with the appropriate coverage in the media, thus the songs "Crna dama", "Daire" and "Plava pesma" became nationwide hits. On September 8, 1977, the band embarked on a large promotional tour, playing the opening show in Belgrade, performing in the sold out Pionir hall, and later at the BOOM festival in Novi Sad. In Zagreb, the band promoted the album in a streetcar which circled the city and after the Zagreb performance, in front of eleven thousand people, the representatives of the Frankfurt-based record label Bellaphon Records were introduced to the band. The band signed a five-year contract for eight albums, after which Mihajlović and Aranđelović traveled to London in order to record the tracks for the English language version of Crna dama for the European and American markets. Black Lady, featuring an alternate album cover, in the Melody Maker was reviewed as "a bad copy of Taste and Deep Purple", however, it received a positive review in Guitar Player. In the annual poll the readers of the Džuboks magazine selected Smak as the best band in 1977 and the band got the best album, cover, single, guitarist, bassist and drummer.

In January 1978, during the Midem music industry trade fair in Cannes, the Black Lady rights were bought by the American Fantasy Records and the Spanish branch of RCA Records. However, the atmosphere within the band had become tense, mostly since the successful Crna dama tour had eventually ended up in the band being twenty million dinars (approximately fifty thousand dollars) in debt after the tour. In such atmosphere they had several unsuccessful live performances, including the half-empty Belgrade Pionir hall concert in the spring of 1978. The band had also performed at a Polish international rock music festival in Poznań. At the time, the PGP RTS label bought the MCI 24-channel studio equipment on which, with the help of the personnel from Morgan studio, the band recorded the maxi single Smak Super 45, featuring "Nevidljive terazije" (The Invisible Scales) and "Hitopadeza" (Hitopadesha), the latter featuring Stojanović simultaneously playing two rhythms. During that period Petkovski recorded a solo album Ko zna (Who Knows), on which on one side of the LP performed Smak members and Leb i Sol members on the other. Soon after Petkovski left due to his military service, being replaced by Tibor Levay, the member of the RTV Novi Sad Orchestra.

=== Decline and crisis (1978–1981) ===
In a tense atmosphere, the band started writing new material, often clashing with Mihailović who did not react to the band's objections to his lyrical works. Nevertheless, the band traveled to England and in Chipping Norton near Oxford, in a local castle, the band installed their studio and started recording their third studio album. Despite frequent arguments, they recorded the progressive rock album Stranice našeg vremena (Pages of our Time), produced by the band themselves with the producer Barry Hammond, and featured the music and part of the lyrics written by Mihailović. The rest of the song lyrics were written by the Kragujevac poet Zoran Petrović, but did not receive positive reactions from the critics. Beside the new "Ponoćni lovac (Biska 18)" (Midnight Hunter (Biska 18)), "Tendži-tandži", "Nebo je samo drum bez dna" (Sky is Just a Bottomless Road), the album featured a rerecorded version of "Ulazak u harem". The album was released by Bellaphon for the international marked and PGP RTB released a licensed Serbian language version of the album. The English language version of the album, entitled Dab in the Middle, named after the suggestion by the guest percussionist on the album, David Moss.

After the album release, Levay left the band, soon to be followed by Mihailović, dissatisfied with the band's objections to his lyrics writing as well as objections to the usage of Moss' lyrics on Dab in the Middle. Smak continued performing, having several performances with the former Mirni Ljudi guitarist Srđan Miodragović, and former Time members Dado Topić and Chris Nichols. During the late 1978, Stojanović got the call to join September, fronted by Tihomir "Pop" Asanović, but declined due to his ambitions to continue working with Smak. At the beginning of 1979, Mihajlović returned to the band, and Laza Ristovski with him, disappointed with the situation in Bijelo Dugme and the failure of his album Stižemo (Here We Come), recorded with his Bijelo Dugme bandmate Ipe Ivandić. With the guest appearance by Dado Topić, the band released the EP Na Balkanu (On The Balkans), featuring the title track and "Gore dole" ("Up and Down"), with the lyrics written by Marina Tucaković. At the time, the band ended their contract with Bellaphon who were dissatisfied with the Smak album sales, with the band being dissatisfied with the album promotion. Another reason was the court case between Moss, who protected the rights to the usage of Dab in the Middle, and Bellaphon, eventually ending in the label paying ten thousand dollars for royalties.

The band continued collaborating with Dado Topić who produced the album Rok cirkus (Rock Circus), released in early 1980, featuring a more commercial hard rock sound, but met with severe criticism due to flaccid song lyrics, written by Marina Tucaković and Marko Glišić, especially the lyrics for the song "La Kukarača" (La Cucharacha). The album however had shown a reminiscence of their previous works in the instrumental "Instrumental Baby", and the songs "Hirošima" ("Hiroshima") and "Ogledalo" (The Mirror). The only song to become a hit from the album was the song "Profesor" ("Professor"). Influenced by the Rolling Stones' Rock 'n' Roll Circus, the band wanted to promote the album on a tour with performances in a circus tent. For that reason, in April 1980, the band traveled to Slovenia in order to sign a contract with the Slovenian Vargas circus company, however, their tent had been damaged after a heavy snowfall. In expecting another tent to arrive, the band had heard the news of the death of president Josip Broz Tito, after which the album was left almost without any promotion. Furthermore, the popularity of punk and new wave music in Yugoslavia had also influenced the commercial failure of the album.

At the beginning of 1981, Mihailović with Smak members decided to record a solo album, however, during the album recording process, they were uncertain whether it should be Točak's solo album or yet another Smak record. Eventually, it was decided that the album should be Mihailović's solo work, mostly since, during the writing process, his brother had died which made an influence on the atmosphere of the album and a part of the material recorded as a dedication to his brother. Another reason was the absence of Aranđelović whom did not participate the album recording due to his illness and thus the three non-instrumental tracks on the album featured the vocals of Dado Topić, in the song "Zašto ne volim sneg" ("Why I Dislike the Snow"), recorded in a single first take, and Zoran "Hoze" Živanović, in the songs "Južni voz" ("Southern Train") and "Nebeski splav" ("Sky Raft"). Beside the material written by Mihajlović, the album featured a cover version of the Macedonian folk song "Zajdi, zajdi" ("Set, Set (Oh, Sun)"), originally composed by Aleksandar Sarijveski. Eventually, Zašto ne volim sneg (Why I Dislike the Snow) was released as a Smak album after the PGP RTB persuaded the band to abolish the idea of a solo record. The album was released in five thousand copies only and quickly sold out in less than a month.

=== Breakup and aftermath (1981–1986) ===
By the time Zašto ne volim sneg got released, the frequent arguments among the band members precipitated their decision to disband following one final show in Belgrade. In June 1981, they held a farewell concert at the Red Star basketball court within the Kalemegdan fortress in front of six thousand fans, with a guest appearance by Dado Topić who joined the band on stage to perform "Na Balkanu". The concert was originally delayed due to heavy rainfall, partially damaging the equipment. Afterwards, there were issues with the show's promoters who reneged on the terms of the agreement regarding payment for the show, leading to band members only receiving about a fifth of the previously agreed payment. The suddenly reduced financial windfall from the final show led to the band's decision to embark on a farewell tour in order to recoup the lost income despite being on unfriendly terms and originally not intending on performing past the Kalemegdan performance. The farewell tour ended in September 1981 and the members went their separate ways.

Soon after the breakup, Stojanović and Mihajlović, together with Dado Topić on bass and lead vocals, made an agreement to form a band called Tito, an idea the three had as far back as 1973, however, due to Mihajlović disliking the concept of not recording new material and relying on their old repertoire, the band never got off the ground. In early 1982, Mihajlović and Stojanović, this time with bassist Lola Andrejić, decided to form an instrumental music trio, continuing with the style first explored on Zašto ne volim sneg, however, after a misunderstanding between Stojanović and Andrejić, the former left the band.

During 1982, Mihajlović released a single "Mantilja" (Mantilla), with "Specijalka" (A Special) as the B-side, and with Andrejić and Moss who often performed live with him, he recorded maxi single "Marš na Drinu" ("March on the River Drina"), a cover of the World War I song. He had also opened a school for guitar players in Kragujevac and Belgrade, through which an abundance of students had passed over the years. During 1982, with his former Smak bandmates, Boris Aranđelović recorded his debut solo album Iz profila (Profile View), after which he moved to London where he minimized his musical career. Stojanović formed the band Cveće (Flowers) in October 1982, with Chris Nichols (keyboards), Miodrag Babalj (vocals), Srećko Maksimović (guitar) and Branko Pavlović "Stenli" (bass), but by the time their debut album Polenov prah (Pollen Powder) was released in 1983, they had already disbanded. Stojanović then performed in Belgrade's Hotel Mažestik, in clubs in Germany and the Soviet Union and participated in the recording sessions of Toma Zdravković's singles "Ej, Branka, Branka" ("Hey, Branka, Branka") and "Kiša je padala" ("The Rain was Falling"). Ristovski joined the Alvin Lee Band, performing on a tour of Yugoslavia and Hungary, and released five solo albums, before returning to Bijelo Dugme in 1985, remaining until their breakup in 1989.

=== Reunions and hiatuses (1986–1992) ===
In mid-October 1986, the mainstay Smak members reunited in the lineup Mihajlović, Stojanović, Aranđelović and Milanović, but without Ristovski who refused to participate in the reunion. The four started rehearsing at the University of Kragujevac campus, and during the rehearsals a young keyboard player Milan Đurđević often attended the rehearsals, however, due to being Mihajlović's reserved towards him, he invited Chris Nichols to record the keyboard parts. The comeback album Smak 86., also featuring Miša Komnenić and Vlada Nikodijević on guest keyboards, but the album was not well received by the critics. The album featured Mihajlović as the album producer, music and lyrics author, even lead vocalist in the song "Kornjačina koža" ("Turtle Skin"). The band members themselves, with the exception of Mihajlović were also dissatisfied with the record: Aranđelović was not satisfied with some of the lyrics and Stojanović was not content with the usage of rhythm machines on certain tracks. After the album release, the band embarked on a tour with Milan Đurđević on keyboards, but without much promotion. After a short tour, the band went on an indefinite hiatus.

In 1987, Mihailović founded his R.M. Točak band, featuring Lola Andrejić and David Moss, with whom he appeared on the Legende YU Rocka (The Legends of YU Rock) concert, organized on May 22, 1987, by the Zagreb Radio 101 at the Dom Sportova, and the recording of the instrumental "Because" appeared on the various artists double live album Legende YU Rocka, released by Jugoton during the same year. Stojanović founded his school of drummers and started performing folk music in both Yugoslavia and abroad. During the time of Smak's inactivity Mihailović, Stojanović and Milanović remained in contact, and in 1988, without much rehearsing, they decided to perform at the traditional Kragujevac Midnight concert, with Milan Đurđević on keyboards, who was at the time serving the army, and the vocalist Milan Šćepović "Šćepa". After having a successful performance in Kragujevac, despite the rumors of reformation, the members devoted to their own careers once again. However, the same lineup had reunited once again in 1990, once again performing at the Kragujevac Midnight concert.

The following year, the band reunited, this time with Aranđelović on vocals, once again at the same concert, and featured a guest appearance by Pera "Džo" Miladinović on harmonica. The same lineup with Ristovski on keyboards performed at the Kragujevac Midnight concert, after which, the band had their first live appearance after six years in Belgrade. The band held two performances in Sava Centar, the first of which was recorded for the live album OdLIVEno (LIVEquefied), on compact cassette only. Beside their own songs, the album featured cover version of blues songs "Cross Road Blues" and "Tobacco Road", and Serbian traditional song "Ukor" ("Blame"). The band had also released a compilation album Smak: Retrospektiva (Smak: A Retrospective) and re-released the album Dab in the Middle as The Pages of Our Time. After the Belgrade performances, the band had a meeting in Kragujevac, where they decided to continue working and started planning a comeback album. Nevertheless, Aranđelović went to Amsterdam where he stayed longer than the intended two months and Milanović and Ristovski did not appear at the band rehearsals, thus the lineup did not make a full-time comeback.

=== TEK and reformation (1993–2002) ===
Having realized that there would not be a default lineup reformation, Mihailović and Stojanović nevertheless continued rehearsing together, playing instrumental music with Mihailović's student Milan "Mikica" Milosavljević, a former Alahambra member, who, despite being a solo guitarist, took up playing bass out of the respect for the two musicians. During one of the rehearsals, having heard Stojanović and his 19-year-old son playing drums simultaneously with his father, Mihajlović suggested that Dejan Stojanović "Kepa Jr." should join the three as the second drummer. At the time, in 1993, Mihajlović got the offer to score the film Vizantijsko plavo (Byzantine Blue), directed by Dragan Marinković, which he recorded Stojanović senior and junior on drums and Milosavljević on bass, signed as the band TEK. The soundtrack album, recorded at the Laza Ristovski's studio, featured guest appearances by Ristovski (keyboards), Zoran Milanović (bass), Marija Mihajlović (vocals), Miroslav Savić (keyboards) and Nenad Petrović (saxophone). Beside his own compositions, the album featured several cover versions of folk motifs, including the 1981 version of "Zajdi, zajdi" and the song "Ukor", as well as the compositions by Miroslav Savić and Dragan Stefanović. Mihajlović eventually got the Crystal Prism award for the album.

After the album release, TEK started a promotional tour, performing instrumental music mainly in clubs, however, on the audience request, they included Smak material, but in instrumental versions with the audience filling the vacant vocalist spot. This was the reason why Stojanović suggested Mihailović to return to a classic rock lineup with a vocalist, and in the meantime, Milosavljević switched to guitar, thus the band were to look for a new vocalist and bassist. At first the band considered the Osvajači vocalist Zvonko Pantović "Čipi", due to a similar vocal style with Aranđelović's, but eventually the new vocalist became Dejan Najdanović "Najda", a former Kramer vocalist, after a successful vocal interpretation of the Free song "All Right Now". On the recommendation of a friend, the new bassist became Vlada Samardžić, a young jazz fusion musician from Novi Sad, who performed with Vasil Hadžimanov. The VANS production company, which released the Vizantijsko plavo soundtrack, wanted to start a collaboration with the band in releasing new material, suggesting them to continue using the name Smak.

Having completed the lineup, and having an album's worth material, Radomir "Točak" Mihailović (guitar), Slobodan "Kepa" Stojanović (drums), Dejan "Kepa Jr." Stojanović (drums), Milan "Mikica" Milosavljević (guitar), Dejan "Najda" Najdanović (vocals) and Vlada Samardžić (bass guitar) entered the studio and recorded the Smak's seventh studio album Bioskop Fox (Fox Cinema), produced by Mihailović and released jointly by VANS, Komuna and PGP RTS in 1995. The entire material, consisting of fourteen tracks, was written by Mihajlović, with the exception for a part of the lyrics, written by Zoran Amar, Predrag Drčelić "Skaki" of Trula Koalicija, Jovan Nikolić and Nikola Mihajlović. In order to promote the album, the band had recorded a promotional video for the song "Lisica" ("Fox"), dedicated to Jimi Hendrix, in a professional film studio in Košutnjak, as well as two promotional videos, for the songs "Organizam bluz" (Organism Blues) and "Miris nje" (The Smell of Her), in Novi Sad. Despite the adequate media promotion, Mihajlović was not satisfied with VANS, partially owing to their inexperience with the music business due to being a film company, thus the band ended the collaboration with the company.

After the album release, the band started tour rehearsals in Kragujevac and had their first live appearance with the new lineup in Čačak on September 9, 1995, followed by performances in Kragujevac, however they were facing the problem of a small number of people attending their shows. At the time, the band got an invitation to go on a tour of Canada but despite everything being set for their arrival, Mihajlović changed his mind and the tour was canceled. After the tour cancellation, the bassist Vlada Samardžić, disappointed with the fact, decided to leave the band and dedicated himself to his studies at the Berklee College of Music. Mihailović suggested Lola Anderjić as his replacement, but after Stojanović's refusal, the new bassist became Slobodan Marković "Sale" from Kragujevac. The new lineup continued performing live, including the performance at the Belgrade Sava Centar, which was broadcast on national television, with the performances featuring drum solos on two drums consisting of three sections, the first being unison drum playing, the second with individual improvisations and the third with the Latin-American rhythms under the influence of Steve Gadd's playing style.

During 1996, the RTV Slovenia released a compilation album The Best of Smak, and the following year, in the spring of 1997, the band had a tour of Slovenia. The success of the tour resulted in the plans for another tour which was canceled due to the problems with the management in Slovenia. After the tour, the band had reduced their live activities, performing mainly free concerts at town squares, including the concert in Kragujevac on which all the former members, with the exception of Miki Petkovski, appeared as guests. In May of the same year, in the Kragujevac Šumadija cinema hall, the band made an experiment with performing an entire concert without audience and the recording of the concert was released on the double live album Live Without Audience, featuring live versions of twenty two tracks from the band's entire career. A promotional video for the song was recorded for the song "Ljudi nije fer" which received an adequate media coverage. The following year, in 1998, in a book edited by Duško Antonić and Danilo Štrbac YU 100: Najbolji albumi jugoslovenske rok i pop muzike (YU 100: The Best Albums of Yugoslav Rock and Pop Music), Crna dama appeared on the 40th and Smak on the 63rd place.

In 1999, the band started working on a new studio album, for which Mihajlović and Stojanović decided that it should feature poly-rhythmic drums and scat singing. Nevertheless, Stojanović suggested that beside scat singing, several tracks should feature lyrics, which Mihajlović refused, and thus Stojanović made a decision not to play on the album. Mihajlović then hired Igor Malešević, at the time the member of Vasil Hadžimanov Band, but after not being satisfied with the rehearsals he was fired and Stojanović recorded the drums for all of the fourteen tracks on the album, which was entirely recorded in 72 hours. Egregor, released by PGP RTS, produced by Mihajlović and Saša Habić, featured only one song with lyrics and on the rest Najdanović was featured on scat singing. The song "5. maj" ("May 5") was dedicated to Led Zeppelin and the theme "SOS" featured a sample of Josip Broz Tito's speech from 1948, older generation folk singers Vuka Šeherović and Mijat Mijatović, and an anonymous Radio Belgrade speak at the time of the World War II occupation of Yugoslavia. The album received mixed critics and did not receive an adequate promotion due to the NATO bombing of Yugoslavia during the same year.

During 1999, Boris Aranđelović recorded a solo album Milion godina (A Million Years) as Boris i Dinosaurusi on which the music was written by former YU grupa guitarist Bata Kostić, Jimmy Barnes and R.M. Točak, the lyrics by Marina Tucaković and Ranko Slijepčević, and the recordings featured Kostić, Ristovski, Kepa Stojanović, Zoran Milanović, Pera Joe and Neverne Bebe guitarist Saša Ranđelović "Ranđa". On March 3, 2000, the band performed at the Kragujevac Le Cinema hall and the recording of the concert was released in 2002 by Active Time as Live – klub Le Cinema (Live – Le Cinema Club) in 2002. The same label released the recording of the TEK concert in Niš recorded in 1994, on the live album Niš 1994. In 2001, the compilation album Istorija (History) was released by PGP RTS, featuring songs from all the periods of Smak's career and the previously unreleased song "Blues od vina", which was recorded on the 1974 Veče uz radio anniversary concert. The following year, the band disbanded. A compilation album featuring a part of the material from Live Without Audience was released as Antologija! (Anthology!) in 2005, and in autumn of the following year, the PGP RTS released a remastered edition of the album Crna dama.

=== Reunion (2010–2015) ===
In 2010, the lineup of Radomir "Točak" Mihailović (guitar), Dejan "Najda" Najdanović (vocals), Slobodan "Kepa" Stojanović (drums), Milan "Mikica" Milosavljević (guitar), Dejan "Kepa Junior" Stojanović (drums) with the new band member Miloš "Šomi" Petrović (bass) reunited and started writing new material. The former bass player Vlada Samardžić did not participate the reunion, but expressed the support of the new lineup. From summer until autumn of the same year, the band had recorded four tracks, "Delfin" (The Dolphin), an instrumental version of the song "Cigansko srce" (Gypsy Heart), originally released on the album Rock cirkus, "Ispiranje" (Ablution) and "Rapsodija o lepom" ("A Rhapsody on Beauty"), which were premiered on the band's official YouTube channel. However, further reunion plans had been interrupted by Slobodan Stojanović's spinal cord surgery. The recorded tracks, along with the bonus video versions of the material, were released in December 2012 on the EP Delfin (The Dolphin) by the Serbian record label One Records. The same label also rereleased in compact disc format the 1992 live album OdLIVEno, previously available on compact cassette only, and released Radomir Mihajlović's solo album Tonsko ukrašavanje (A Tonal Ornamentation).

On December 29, 2012, Smak reunited in the default lineup – Radomir Mihajlović (guitar), Boris Aranđelović (vocals), Zoran Milanović (bass guitar) and Slobodan Stojanović (drums) – for a concert in Kombank Arena. The concert also featured members of the current Smak lineup – Dejan Najdanović (vocals), Milan Milosavljević (guitar), Miloš Petrović (bass guitar) and Dejan Stojanović (drums) – as well as Dejan Zdraevski on keyboards. The reunion of the band's default lineup saw large media coverage and the concert featured about 18,000 spectators. On June 27, 2013, the band, in both the default and current lineup, performed at Kragujevac Arsenal Fest. It was the band's first concert in Kragujevac since 1997. In 2014, the band rerecorded their 1978 song "Nebo je samo drum bez dna" ("The Sky Is Only a Bottomless Road") and released it on their official YouTube channel.

On June 20, 2015, the band, once again in both default and current lineup, held a concert in Belgrade Ušće park, in front of about 20,000 spectators. The concert featured the bands Oktava, Rare and Epilog as the opening bands and Dado Topić as guest.

The concert at Ušće park was Aranđelović's last performance with the band. He died on August 27 of the same year in Rotterdam, after long illness. He was 67.

=== New reunion (2022–present) ===
On May 6, 2022, Smak reunited again with a new singer, Jovan Pantić Panta, whose voice tone is very similar to Aranđelović's. They held a concert in Kragujevac at the City Hall.

On September 9, 2022, Smak held a concert in Čačak.

== Legacy ==
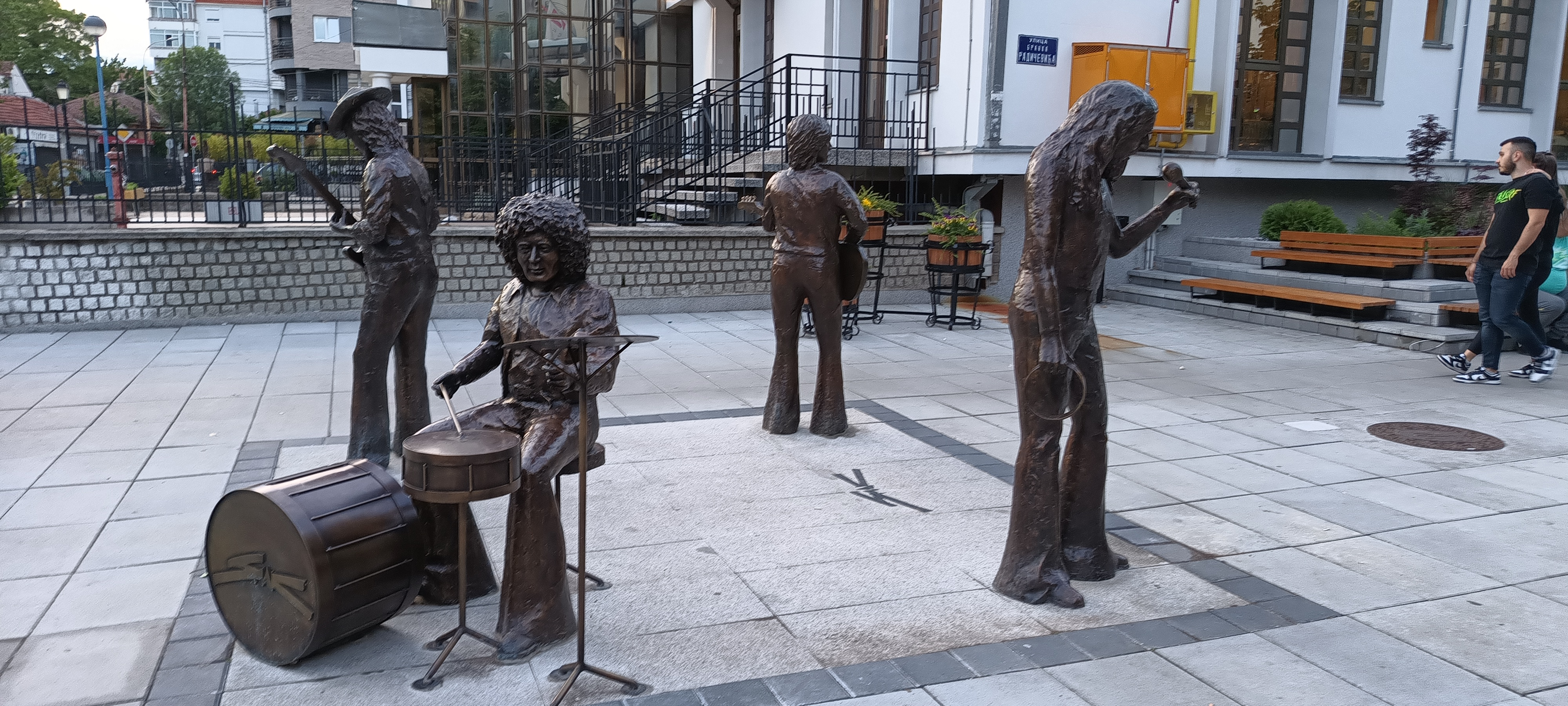
Monument to Smak in Kragujevac unveiled in 2023

In 2017, the band was awarded the silver medal for Merit by the President of Serbia Tomislav Nikolić for their contribution to Serbian culture.

Smak songs have been covered by a plethora of acts and the notable cover versions include: The girl group Aska medley which consisted of passages from "Satelit", "Crna dama", "Nevidljive terazije", "Halo", "Tendži Tandži", "Daire" and "Gore dole" on their 1982 album Disco Rock. The song "Daire" was covered in 1994 by the band Neverne Bebe on their album Neverne Bebe I, their version featuring a passage from "Zajdi, zajdi"; the band covered the song once again on their 2004 album Neverne Bebe IV – Dvoje – The Best Of . Osvajači covered the song "Ljudi nije fer" on their 1994 unplugged concert. The song "Crna dama" was covered in 2000 by singer Viktorija on her album Nostalgija (Nostalgia). In 2011, the band Čipi i Industrija, featuring the original Osvajači members, covered the song "Na Balkanu", with former Generacija 5 vocalist Đorđe David on guest vocals, released on the album Na Balkanu. On his 2012 album Štrajk mozga (Brain Strike), the rapper Edo Maajka sampled the riff of "Biska 2", from the Live Without Audience album, in the song "Diši" ("Breathe"). The following year, "Biska 2" was covered by the Milan Petrović Quartet on their instrumental cover album Favorites.

The albums and songs by Smak were featured on several all-time greatest lists of former Yugoslav rock. The book YU 100: najbolji albumi jugoslovenske rok i pop muzike (YU 100: The Best albums of Yugoslav pop and rock music), published in 1998, features two Smak albums: Crna dama (ranked No. 40) and Smak (ranked No. 63). On the list of 100 greatest Yugoslav album, published by Croatian edition of Rolling Stone in 2015, Crna dama was ranked No. 92. The Rock Express Top 100 Yugoslav Rock Songs of All Times list, published in 2000, featured seven songs by Smak: "Crna dama" (polled No.5), "Ulazak u harem" (polled No.12), "Daire" (polled No.23), "Blues u parku" (polled No.47), "Šumadijski blues" (polled No.65), "Zajdi, zajdi" (polled No.82) and "Satelit" (polled No.94). In 2006, "Plava pesma" was polled No.61 on the B92 Top 100 Domestic Songs list. In 2011, "Daire" was polled, by the listeners of Radio 202, one of 60 greatest songs released by PGP-RTB/PGP-RTS.

== Members ==
Former members

- Radomir "Točak" Mihailović – guitar (1971–1981, 1986–1992, 1994–2002, 2010–2015)
- Slobodan "Kepa" Stojanović – drums, percussion (1971–1981, 1986–1992, 1994–2002, 2010–2015)
- Zoran Milanović – bass guitar (1971–1981, 1986–1992, 2012, 2013, 2015)
- Boris Aranđelović – vocals (1973–1981, 1986–1987, 1989–1992, 2012, 2013, 2015)
- Milan "Mikica" Milosavljević – guitar (1994–2002, 2010–2015)
- Dejan "Kepa Jr." Stojanović – drums, percussion (1994–2002, 2010–2015)
- Dejan "Najda" Najdanović – vocals (1994–2002, 2010–2015)
- Dejan Zdravevski – keyboards (2012–2015)
- Filip Milanović – bass guitar (2015)
- Miša Nikolić – keyboards (1971–1972)
- Lola Andrijić – bass guitar (1980–1990)
- Slobodan "Koma" Kominac – vocals (1971–1972, 1973)
- Slobodan "Johan" Jovanović – vocals (1972)
- Milorad "Kimi" Petrović – vocals (1973)
- Laza Ristovski – keyboards (1974–1976, 1979–1981, 1992)
- Miodrag "Miki" Petkovski – keyboards (1976–1978, 1979)
- Tibor Levay – keyboards (1978)
- David Moss – percussion (1978)
- Milan Đurđević – keyboards (1986–1990)
- Milan Šćepović – vocals (1988, 1990)
- Vlada Samardžić – bass guitar (1994–1997)
- Slobodan "Sale" Marković – bass guitar (1997–2002)
- Miloš "Šomi" Petrović – bass guitar (2010–2013)

== Discography ==
- Smak (1975)
- Crna dama (1977)
- Black Lady (1978)
- Stranice našeg vremena (1978)
- Dab in the Middle (1978)
- Rock cirkus (1980)
- Zašto ne volim sneg (1981)
- Smak 86. (1986)
- Bioskop Fox (1995)
- Egregor (1999)
