= Zašto ne volim sneg =

Studio album by Smak
- Released: 1981
- Genre: Progressive rock
- Language: Serbian
- Label: PGP RTB

Smak chronology
| Rok cirkus (1980) | Zašto ne volim sneg (1981) | Smak 86. (1986) |

Zašto ne volim sneg is the fifth studio album by the Serbian rock band Smak, released in 1981. It was released as LP and music cassette. It contains seven tracks, most famously Smak's version of the Macedonian folk song "Zajdi, zajdi". It was initially agreed by the entire band that this would be Točak's solo effort, but they were pushed by their label to make it a full-band recording, not a solo project.. 'Južni voz' is a common live staple.

== Track listing ==
A side
| No. | Title | Length |
|---|---|---|
| 1. | "Južni voz (South Train)" | 3:29 |
| 2. | "Zajdi, zajdi (Set, Set)" | 5:27 |
| 3. | "Talisman" | 4:42 |
| 4. | "Zašto ne volim sneg (Why I Don't Like The Snow)" | 7:09 |

B side
| No. | Title | Length |
|---|---|---|
| 1. | "Balet (Ballet)" | 5:32 |
| 2. | "Maht pustinja (Maht Desert)" | 9:31 |
| 3. | "Nebeski splav (Sky Raft)" | 4:21 |

== Personnel ==
- Dado Topić – vocals (A4)
- Zoran Živanović "Hoze" – vocals (A1, B3)
- Radomir Mihajlović "Točak" – guitar
- Laza Ristovski – keyboards
- Zoran Milanović – bass
- Slobodan Stojanović "Kepa" – drums

== Legacy ==
In 2015 Zašto ne volim sneg album cover was ranked 64th on the list of 100 Greatest Album Covers of Yugoslav Rock published by web magazine Balkanrock.
