= Ćiribiribela =

Studio album by Bijelo Dugme
- Released: November 24, 1988
- Recorded: September–November 1988
- Studio: RTV Sarajevo Studio I, Sarajevo; Akvarijus Studio, Belgrade; Nenad Vilović's studio, Split; SIM studio, Zagreb
- Genre: Rock; pop rock; folk rock
- Length: 39:36
- Label: Diskoton / Kamarad / Komuna
- Producer: Goran Bregović

Bijelo Dugme chronology
| Mramor, kamen i željezo (1987) | Ćiribiribela (1988) | Turneja 2005: Sarajevo, Zagreb, Beograd (2006) |

Ćiribiribela is the ninth and final studio album by Yugoslav rock band Bijelo Dugme, released in 1988. Bijelo Dugme would split-up in 1989, and Ćirbiribela would be the band's last release (excluding compilation albums) before the band's 2005 reunion and the live album Turneja 2005: Sarajevo, Zagreb, Beograd.

== Background ==
Ćiribiribela recording sessions revealed the crisis within the band. Bijelo Dugme leader Goran Bregović hired studio musician Nenad Stefanović "Japanac" and Bajaga i Instruktori member Vladimir "Vlajko" Golubović on to play bass guitar and drums respectively on the songs "Lijepa naša" ("Our Beautiful") and "Evo, zakleću se" ("Here, I Swear"), much to dissatisfaction of Bijelo Dugme bassist Zoran Redžić and drummer Ipe Ivandić. Recorded during the political crisis in Yugoslavia, Ćiribiribela was—just like its predecessor, Pljuni i zapjevaj moja Jugoslavijo (Spit and Sing, My Yugoslavia)—marked by Goran Bregović's pacifist efforts: the album cover featured Edward Hicks' painting Noah's Ark, the song "Lijepa naša" featured the national anthem of Croatia "Lijepa naša domovino" ("Our Beautiful Homeland") combined with the Serbian World War I patriotic song "Tamo daleko" ("There, Far Away"), and the title track featured lyrics about a couple which wonders what are they going to do if war begins, and concludes that they are going to "stay at home and kiss". The lyrics for the song "Đurđevdan je, a ja nisam s onom koju volim" were, by Bregović's words, inspired by a verse from Đorđe Balašević's song "Priča o Vasi Ladačkom" ("The Story of Vasa Ladački").

== Track listing ==
All songs written by Goran Bregović, except where noted.

| No. | Title | Lyrics | Music | Length |
|---|---|---|---|---|
| 1. | "Ćiribiribela" | | | 4:12 |
| 2. | "Šta ima novo" ("What's New") | | | 5:21 |
| 3. | "Neću to na brzaka" ("I Don't Want It to Be Quick") | | | 4:10 |
| 4. | "Evo, zakleću se" ("Here, I'll Swear") | | | 5:53 |
| 5. | "Đurđevdan je, a ja nisam s onom koju volim" ("It's St. George's Day, and I'm Not with the One I Love") | | Traditional | 3:55 |
| 6. | "Napile se ulice" ("The Streets Are Drunk") | | | 2:49 |
| 7. | "Ako ima Boga" ("If There Is God") | | | 5:18 |
| 8. | "Nakon svih ovih godina" ("After All These Years") | | | 4:40 |
| 9. | "Lijepa naša" ("Our Beautiful") | Goran Bregović; Antun Mihanović; Đorđe Marinković | Goran Bregović; Josip Runjanin; Đorđe Marinković | 3:18 |

== Personnel ==
- Goran Bregović - guitar, producer
- Alen Islamović - vocals
- Zoran Redžić - bass guitar
- Ipe Ivandić - drums
- Laza Ristovski - keyboards

=== Additional personnel ===
- Nenad Stefanović - bass guitar (on tracks: 4, 9)
- Vladimir Golubović - drums (on tracks: 4, 9)
- Jasmin Sokolović - trumpet
- Klapa Trogir
- Skopje Orchestra Kardijevi
- 1st Belgrade Singing Society
- Vladimir Smolec - engineer
- Rajko Bartula - engineer
- Theodore Yanni - engineer
- Piko Stančić - mixed by
- Trio Sarajevo - design

== Reception ==
Rock critic Darko Glavan wrote about the album in Danas:

As, by Bregović's legitimate judgement, Yugoslavia isn't worth insulting anymore, and his job is singing, all he can do is turn worries into singing, in which Ćiribiribela is a complete success and a great example of escapism with a good cause. [...] material which indicates one of Bregović's greatest discographyc successes, both commercial and aesthetic.

Rock critic Vladimir Stakić wrote in Borba:

During work on the album Ćiribiribela, Bijelo Dugme leader, again, obviously, but now even more drastically than two years ago, found himself in a situation in which he, promoting Yugoslavism, has to concurrently be a Serb, a Croat, a Muslim, and everything else.

'Đurđevdan' was, without any doubt — a spectacular song — in that song joined some collective, ancient and re-evoked, (self-)destructive feelings, recorded by Bregović, something destroying and full of some muddy misery (that song always reminded me of a muddy path, in a foggy day, on an uncertain road, which leads either to nowhere or to precipice). That song is also 'the most Serbian' — the Salonicaesque sentiment, the sentiment of a rough hand creating something incredibly touching, like the feeling caused by those wonderful monuments [to Serbian soldiers] by the road, emanates from the song — can it be by chance that at one point it became something like an alternative an spontaneous Serbian anthem? Suddenly, Alen sings in our language, roughly, bitterly and powerfully, with the lyrics which seem like the lyrics from a two-hundred-year-old folk poem, in classical decasyllable! — the verse that is more "our" than any other, with vowing through repeating, which seems like it came directly out of Kosovo cycle [...]

— Đorđe Matić

The album's biggest hit was "Đurđevdan je, a ja nisam s onom koju volim", which featured Fejat Sejdić Trumpet Orchestra. Other hits included "Evo zakleću se", "Ako ima Boga", "Šta ima novo", "Nakon svih ovih godina", pop-influenced "Napile se ulice" and Dalmatian folk music-inspired "Ćirbiribela".

== "Đurđevdan" video ban ==
After the album release, Radio-Television Belgrade decided to finance and produce a video for the song "Đurđevdan je, a ja nisam s onom koju volim". The original idea was for the video to feature iconography inspired by Serbian Army in World War I. The video shoot was organized in the village Koraćica in Central Serbia. The band came to the video shoot reportedly not knowing anything about the concept of the video about to be shot. The band members were to wear insignia-less military uniforms along with old weapons, but Islamović thought it too "pro-war", refusing to wear a military uniform. Eventually, the band and the video director reached an agreement: everyone, except Islamović, wore Serbian traditional costumes, with only several of the original props used. Still, after the video was recorded, the Radio-Television Belgrade executives themselves decided not to broadcast it, fearing it might remind of the Chetnik movement.

== Promotional tour and Bijelo Dugme disbandment ==
At the beginning of 1989, the band went on a tour which should have lasted until April 1. The concert in Belgrade, held at Belgrade Fair – Hall 1 on 4 February, was attended by about 13,000 people. The concert in Sarajevo's Zetra, held on 11 February, was also very successful; it was attended by more than 20,000 people. However, on some concerts in Croatia, the audience booed and threw various objects on stage while the band performed their pro-Yugoslav songs.

After the concert in Modriča, held on March 15, with four concerts left until the end of the tour, Islamović checked into a hospital with kidney pains. This event revealed the existing conflicts inside the band: Bregović claimed that Islamović had no problems during the tour, while the band's manager, Raka Marić, stated that Bijelo Dugme would search for a new singer for the planned concerts in China and Soviet Union. Bregović himself went to Paris, leaving Bijelo Dugme's future status open for speculations. As Yugoslav Wars broke out in 1991, it became clear that Bijelo Dugme will not continue their activity.

Ćirbiribela would be the band's last release (excluding compilation albums) before the band's 2005 reunion and the live album Turneja 2005: Sarajevo, Zagreb, Beograd (Tour 2005: Sarajevo, Zagreb, Belgrade).

== Legacy ==
In 2015, Ćiribiribela album cover was ranked 17th on the list of 100 Greatest Album Covers of Yugoslav Rock published by web magazine Balkanrock.

== Covers ==
- Serbian and Yugoslav folk singer Zorica Brunclik recorded a cover of "Đurđevdan" on her 1989 album Eh, da je sreće (Oh, I Was Lucky).
- Turkish pop singer Sezen Aksu recorded covers of "Šta ima novo" and "Đurđevdan" in Turkish, titled "Erkekler" and "Hıdrellez", on her 1997 album Düğün ve Cenaze.
- Croatian pop singer Alka Vuica recorded a cover of "Šta ima novo" on her 1999 album Balkan Girl.
- Serbian pop singer Željko Joksimović covered "Ako ima boga" and "Đurđevdan" on his 2003 live video album Koncert (Concert).
