= Dab in the Middle =

Studio album by Smak
- Released: 1978
- Genre: Rock, progressive rock
- Language: English
- Label: Bacilus Records/Bellaphon
- Producer: Barry Hammond

Smak chronology
Stranice našeg vremena (1978)	Dab in the Middle (1978)	Rok cirkus (1980)

1992 MC reissue cover
- The album was rereleased as The Pages of Our Time

Dab in the Middle is the fourth studio album by the Serbian rock band Smak, released in 1978. The record was named after English colloquial smack dab in the middle, which means to be "In the middle of a storyline".

== Track listing ==
A side
No.	Title	Length
1.	"Horse of Chrome"	3:33
2.	"Dark Roads"	4:03
3.	"What's That, Man?"	6:10
4.	"The Pages of Our Time"	5:03

B side
No.	Title	Length
1.	"Early to Bed Early to Rise"	3:52
2.	"Entrance to Harem"	4:02
3.	"White Sails"	11:11

== Personnel ==
- Boris Aranđelović – vocals
- Radomir Mihajlović "Točak" – guitar
- Tibor Levay – keyboards
- Zoran Milanović – bass
- Slobodan Stojanović "Kepa" – drums

=== Guest ===
- David Moos – Congas, Timbales, Maracas, Castanets, Gong, Cabasa
