= Gypsy Heart =

Gypsy Heart may refer to:

== Music ==
- Gypsy Heart Tour, Miley Cyrus, 2011

=== Albums ===
- Gypsy Heart (Cobie Caillat album), 2014
- Gypsy Heart, by Ashik on New Earth Records, 2013
- Gypsy Heart, by Playmen & Hadley, 2013
- Srce Cigansko (Gypsy Heart) Boban Marković, 2000

=== Songs ===
- "(I Love Your) Gypsy Heart", by Peggy Lee from If You Go, 1961
- "Gypsy Heart", by Bobby Curtola, 1963
- "Gypsy Heart", song by Elton John from Leather Jackets (album) 1986
- "Gypsy Heart", song by the Red Elvises from I Wanna See You Bellydance, 1998
- "Cygańskie serce" (Polish: "Gypsy Heart"), song by Edyta Górniak
- "Gitano Corazón" (Spanish: "Gypsy Heart"), song by Natalia Oreiro from Tu Veneno, 2000
- "Cigansko srce" (Serbian: "Gypsy Heart"), song by the Serbian rock band Smak from Delfin (EP)
