= Bioskop Fox =

Studio album by Smak
- Released: March 1995
- Recorded: November–December 1994
- Genre: Rock, Progressive rock
- Language: Serbian
- Label: Komuna / VANS / PGP-RTS
- Producer: Radomir Mihajlović "Točak"

Smak chronology
Smak 86. (1986)	Bioskop Fox (1995)	Egregor (1999)

Bioskop Fox (Cinema Fox) is the seventh studio album by the Serbian rock band Smak, released in 1995.

== Track listing ==
All lyrics are written by Radomir Mihajlović "Točak".

Bioskop Fox
No.	Title	Lyrics	Length
1.	"Lisica (Fox)"		2:51
2.	"Miris nje (Smell Of Her)"		2:51
3.	"Organizam Blues (Organism Blues)"		4:55
4.	"Možda imam vremena (I Might Have Time)"	Predrag Drčelić - Skaki	3:37
5.	"Strašilo (Scarecrow)"		3:35
6.	"Idi (Go)"		2:49
7.	"Beli bik (White Bull)"	Jovan Nikolić - Jof	2:52
8.	"Možda postojim (I Might Exist)"	Nikola Mihailović	3:13
9.	"Uspavanka na paru (Lullaby On Steam)"		4:33
10.	"Remizov valcer (Remiz's Waltz)"	Zoran Amar	7:21
11.	"Žurba (Hurry)"		2:47
12.	"Pauk (Spider)"		3:30
13.	"Hladno je (It's Cold)"	Predrag Drčelić - Skaki	4:11
14.	"Prostrano (Spacious)"		4:19

== Personnel ==
- Dejan Najdanović - vocals
- Radomir Mihajlović "Točak" - guitar
- Milan Milosavljević - guitar
- Vlada Samardžić - bass
- Slobodan Stojanović "Kepa" - drums
- Dejan Stojanović - drums
