= Rock cirkus =

Studio album by Smak
- Released: 1980
- Genre: Rock, Progressive rock, Hard rock
- Language: Serbian
- Label: PGP RTB
- Producer: Dado Topić

Smak chronology
Stranice našeg vremena (1978)	Rock cirkus (1980)	Zašto ne volim sneg (1981)

Rock cirkus is the fourth studio album by the Serbian rock band Smak, released in 1980.

== Track listing ==
A side
No.	Title	Length
1.	"Rock cirkus (Rock Circus)"	3:54
2.	"Profesor (Professor)"	4:52
3.	"Ogledalo (Mirror)"	6:19
4.	"Cigansko srce (Gypsy Heart)"	3:39

B side
No.	Title	Length
1.	"La kukaraca (La Cucaracha)"	4:01
2.	"Instrumental Baby"	5:56
3.	"I to je za ljude (That's For People Too)"	3:11
4.	"Hirosima (Hiroshima)"	5:01

== Personnel ==
- Boris Aranđelović – vocals
- Radomir Mihajlović "Točak" – guitar
- Laza Ristovski – keyboards
- Zoran Milanović – bass
- Slobodan Stojanović "Kepa" – drums
