= Egregor (album) =

Studio album by Smak
- Released: February 1999
- Recorded: November 1998
- Genre: Blues rock, progressive rock
- Language: Serbian
- Label: PGP RTS
- Producer: Saša Habić and Radomir Mihajlović

Smak chronology
Bioskop Fox (1995)	Egregor (1999)	Delfin (2012)

Egregor is the tenth studio album by the Serbian rock band Smak, released in 1999. It was released as CD. Egregore is, as it is stated on album, "psychological and spiritual energy that we create together".

== Track listing ==
No.	Title	Length
1.	"5. maj (The Fifth Of May)" (Dedicated to Led Zeppelin)	3:15
2.	"Do vazduha (To The Air)"	3:25
3.	"Lujka (Fool)"	2:45
4.	"Waltz"	3:06
5.	"Petica (Five)"	3:17
6.	"Swing On"	4:27
7.	"H-Rizl"	3:33
8.	"Skoro iz (Almost From)"	5:00
9.	"Music Out"	4:07
10.	"Rif Srbija (Riff Serbia)"	2:11
11.	"Padalica (Shooting Star)"	3:57
12.	"SOS"	4:40

== Personnel ==
- Dejan Najdanović "Najda" – vocals
- Radomir Mihailović "Točak" – guitar
- Mikica Milosavljević – guitar
- Sale Marković – bass
- Slobodan Stojanović "Kepa" and Dejan Stojanović Kepa Jr. – drums
