= Smak 86. =

Studio album by Smak
- Released: 8. April 1986.
- Recorded: November 1985. - March 1986.
- Genre: Rock, Progressive rock
- Language: Serbian
- Label: PGP RTB
- Producer: Radomir Mihajlović "Točak"

Smak chronology
Stranice našeg vremena (1981)	Smak 86. (1986)	Bioskop Fox (1995)

Smak 86. is the sixth studio album by the Serbian band Smak, released in 1986. It was released as LP.

== Track listing ==
All lyrics are written by Radomir Mihajlović "Točak".

A side
No.	Title	Length
1.	"Želim da kupim nove pantalone (I Want To Buy New Pants)"	2:59
2.	"Sava"	5:04
3.	"Put pod noge bre (Go, On The Road)"	3:42
4.	"Sunčani sat (Sunny Clock)"	4:31

B side
No.	Title	Length
1.	"Kad spavaš sam (When You Sleep Alone)"	4:38
2.	"Ja volim tvoje grudi (I Love Your Chest)"	4:08
3.	"Na vrhovima prstiju (On The Fingertips)"	3:07
4.	"Kornjačina koža (Turtle Skin)"	5:09

== Personnel ==
- Boris Aranđelović - vocals
- Radomir Mihajlović "Točak" - guitar
- Milan Đurđević - keyboards
- Zoran Milanović - bass
- Slobodan Stojanović "Kepa" - drums
