= Stižemo =

Studio album by Laza & Ipe
- Released: 1978
- Recorded: Matrix Recording Studios, London; February - March 1978
- Genre: Progressive rock Symphonic rock
- Label: ZKP RTLJ
- Producer: Zlatko Hold

Laza Ristovski chronology
Stižemo (1978)	Merge (1982)

Ipe Ivandić chronology
Stižemo (1978)

Stižemo (trans. Here We Come) is an album by Serbian and Yugoslav keyboardist Laza Ristovski and Bosnian drummer Ipe Ivandić, released in 1978.

== Recording ==
=== Early 1978: side project ===
While conceptualizing and making Stižemo, both Ristovski and Ivandić were members of the hard rock band Bijelo Dugme. The duo decided to record the album as a side project during 1978 while the band was on hiatus because of its leader, guitarist Goran Bregović, serving out his mandatory Yugoslav People's Army stint. Ristovski and Ivandić were not the only Bijelo Dugme members who had decided to make use of the hiatus in order to pursue a side project as the band's vocalist Željko Bebek was also off on his own recording a solo album, Skoro da smo isti, which would be released by Jugoton.

During early 1978, ahead of going into the studio to record the material, Ristovski and Ivandić, as well as the rest of the musicians they gathered for the project, got together in a motel in Kruščica outside of Vitez for practice sessions. However, the sessions didn't go smoothly, reportedly, due to both Ristovski's and Ivandić's excessive drinking. Each song on the album was composed by Ristovski with the lyrics written by Ranko Boban. In addition to Ristovski and Ivandić, the personnel preparing the album included: Leb i Sol member Vlatko Stefanovski on guitar, Teška Industrija member Goran Kovačević on vocals, Ivandić's sister Gordana Ivandić also on vocals, and Zlatko Hold on bass guitar and synthesizer. Stefanovski's participation was seen as returning a favour to Ristovski for having had arranged Stefanovski's band Leb i Sol's appearance among the opening acts at the Hajdučka česma concert six months earlier.

Stižemo was recorded in Matrix Recording Studios in London during February and March 1978 with Zlatko Hold as producer. Ristovski and Ivandić reportedly ran out of funds while in London and had to borrow money from Bijelo Dugme bandmate Zoran Redžić in order to cover the recording costs. Jugoton expressed interest in releasing the recorded material, however, the label—that also had Bijelo Dugme in its stable of acts—remained non-committal in terms of the exact monetary figure or release date for Stižemo as the negotiations between the two parties dragged on.

=== May 1978: Ristovski and Ivandić leave Bijelo Dugme ===
In parallel to making Stižemo and negotiating financial terms of its release, Ristovski and Ivandić also fought a continual battle with Bregović for more creative input within Bijelo Dugme. Specifically, they sought to be included in the writing credits, a concession that would have affected subsequent revenue sharing and royalty payments. Stižemo thus also became leverage of sorts as the duo would meet with Bregović during his army leaves to play him the recordings, believing they could persuade him to let them compose for Bijelo Dugme. However, after getting flatly rejected by Bregović, the two—encouraged by the positive reactions of the critics that had been given the opportunity to listen to the still-unreleased Stižemo material—decided to leave Bijelo Dugme.

Ivandić's exit, in particular, was accompanied with an unpleasant exchange between him and Bregović in the Yugoslav press. In the 29 May 1978 issue of Zdravo, Ivandić stated: "[While I was with Bijelo Dugme], the [Yugoslav] public saw me as a star, while in reality I was actually a glorified stagehand. That's why Laza and I had to leave". The Yugoslav public didn't have to wait long for Bregović's response: "Ivandić [says he]'s leaving Bijelo Dugme because he's sick of playing my songs ... only to then go and play Laza Ristovski's songs. He's a fool for crapping on the things he did at Dugme. [So, let me get this straight], he's got an issue with carrying amplifiers while I—a much bigger star who can buy him and sell him ten times before breakfast—don't mind it? Go figure".

By late June 1978, the negotiations with Jugoton broke down for good as the label refused to pay US$300,000 Ristovski and Ivandić had requested for the album. The duo then turned to other Yugoslav labels, soon agreeing terms with ZKP RTLJ for the release of Stižemo. The label promoted the album enthusiastically with high quality press material. Furthermore, Stižemo marked the very first time in Yugoslavia that an album had its release date publicly announced in advance; a widely used practice in the country at the time was to release an album before promoting it. Still, the release date ZKP RTLJ originally committed to would turn out to be delayed. The album was eventually released on 10 September 1978.

== Track listing ==
All music written by Laza Ristovski, all lyrics written by Ranko Boban

Side A: Odlazak (The Leaving)
No.	Title	Length
1.	"Noć u paklu" ("A Night in Hell")	5:52
2.	"Ko sam ja?" ("Who Am I?")	7:39
3.	"Intro-Mental"	6:12

Side B: Dolazak (The Coming)
No.	Title	Length
1.	"Poslije svega" ("After All")	5:56
2.	"Top Hit Lista" ("Top Hit List")	2:59
3.	"Ljubav" ("Love")	6:01

== Personnel ==
- Laza Ristovski - piano, Hammond organ, synthesizer, electric piano, Mellotron, acoustic guitar
- Ipe Ivandić - drums, percussion, vocals, arranged by

=== Additional personnel ===
- Zlatko Hold - bass guitar, synthesizer, producer
- Vlatko Stefanovski - guitar
- Goran Kovačević - vocals
- Gordana Ivandić - vocals
- Richard Whaley - engineer
- Will Reid-Dick - engineer
- Andy Llewellyn - engineer (assistant)
- Peter James - engineer (assistant)
- Ray Staff - engineer (cutting)
- Ljubomir Milojević - design

== Events after the release ==
On 10 September 1978, the same day the promotional tour was scheduled to begin, five men—musicians Ivandić, Goran Kovačević, Zlatko Hold, and Ranko Boban as well as suspected dealer Jadran Adamović—were arrested in Sarajevo on suspicion of hashish possession and distribution.

In the documentary series Rockovnik, Ristovski recalled:

We were ready to go on tour, and I'm waiting at home [in Belgrade], waiting for them to pick me up, we're leaving, to some town, I can't remember which one. And then, Ipe's sister phones me, saying: 'There won't be a tour', I'm asking: 'Why, what's the matter?', and she goes: 'They arrested Ipe'. I immediately bought a plane ticket and went to Sarajevo. And there I heard [the details of] what had happened.

The musicians were indicted (criminally charged) with "possession of hashish and enablement of narcotics use" and put on trial where the Office of the Public Prosecutor was represented by Ahmet Fazlić. The process concluded with the Sarajevo District Court's three-person judicial council—presided over by the judge Husein Hubijer—sentencing Ivandić to three and a half years in jail. Goran Kovačević was sentenced to a year and a half, Ranko Boban to a year in jail while Zlatko Hold got six months for obstruction of justice. On appeal, the case went before the Supreme Court of the Socialist Republic of Bosnia and Herzegovina where Ivandić's sentence was reduced to three years.

Ristovski and Ivandić never performed live as Laza & Ipe. They would eventually perform together once again as members of Bijelo Dugme (to which Ivandić returned in 1982, and Ristovski in 1984).

== Legacy ==
In 2015 Stižemo album cover was ranked 100th on the list of 100 Greatest Album Covers of Yugoslav Rock published by web magazine Balkanrock.
