= Black Lady (album) =

Studio album by Smak
- Released: 1978
- Genre: Rock, Progressive rock
- Label: Bellaphon Records
- Producer: Martin Levan

Smak chronology
Crna dama (1977)	Black Lady (1978)	Smak Super 45 (1978)

US release cover

Black Lady is the debut English-language album by Yugoslav rock band Smak, released in 1978. It is the English-language version of their second album, Crna dama. The album was recorded and mixed in London.

== Track listing ==
A side
No.	Title	Length
1.	"Black Lady"	3:32
2.	"Matter of Love"	5:15
3.	"Domestic Lesson"	7:40

B side
No.	Title	Length
1.	"Hello"	4:01
2.	"Suffer"	6:54
3.	"Tambourine"	3:38
4.	"Here Alone (Sad Once More)"	4:29

== Personnel ==
- Boris Aranđelović - vocals
- Radomir Mihajlović "Točak" - guitar
- Miodrag Petkovski "Miki" - keyboards
- Zoran Milanović - bass
- Slobodan Stojanović "Kepa" - drums

=== Guest ===
- Maurice Pert - percussion

=== The Harmonium Quartet ===
- Pat Nalling - first violin
- John Knight - second violin
- Brian Mack - viola
- Ben Kennard - cello
