= Turneja 2005: Sarajevo, Zagreb, Beograd =

Live album by Bijelo Dugme
- Released: 2006
- Recorded: 2005
- Venues: Koševo City Stadium, Sarajevo; Maksimir Stadium, Zagreb; Belgrade Hippodrome, Belgrade
- Genres: Rock; pop rock; folk rock
- Label: Music Star Production / Kamarad
- Producer: Goran Bregović

Bijelo Dugme chronology
Ćiribiribela (1988)	Turneja 2005: Sarajevo, Zagreb, Beograd (2006)

Slipcase cover

Turneja 2005: Sarajevo, Zagreb, Beograd (transl. "2005 Tour: Sarajevo, Zagreb, Belgrade") is the fourth live album by Yugoslav rock band Bijelo Dugme, released in 2006. The album was recorded on Bijelo Dugme's 2005 reunion tour, and is the band's first release (excluding compilation albums) since the 1988 studio album Ćiribiribela.

== Background ==
Bijelo Dugme disbanded in 1989, two years before the Yugoslav Wars broke out. During the following decade, the band's former leader, Goran Bregović, stated on numerous occasions that he would not reunite Bijelo Dugme. However, in 2005, Bijelo Dugme reunited, featuring most of the musicians that passed through the band: Goran Bregović on guitar, Željko Bebek, Mladen Vojičić "Tifa" and Alen Islamović on vocals, Zoran Redžić on bass guitar, Milić Vukašinović and Điđi Jankelić on drums and Vlado Pravdić and Laza Ristovski on keyboards. The reunited Bijelo Dugme did not feature bass guitarist Jadranko Stanković, who was a member of the original Bijelo Dugme lineup, but spent only several months with the band, drummer Ipe Ivandić, who died in 1994, as well as four short-term touring musicians, bass guitarists Mustafa "Mute" Kurtalić, Ljubiša Racić and Sanin Karić and drummer Garabet Tavitjan.

The reunion saw large media attention in all former Yugoslav republics, followed by various forms of yugonostalgia. The band held only three concerts: in Sarajevo, at Koševo City Stadium, Zagreb, at Maksimir Stadium, and Belgrade, at Belgrade Hippodrome. The concerts featured a string orchestra, a brass band, klapa group Nostalgija and two female singers from Bregovć's Weddings and Funerals Orchestra. The concert in Sarajevo attracted about 60,000 people, and the concert in Zagreb was attended by more than 70,000 people. For the concert in Belgrade, more than 220,000 tickets were sold, but it was later estimated that it was attended by more than 250,000 people, making it one of the highest-attended ticketed concerts of all time. However, the Belgrade concert was much criticized due the inadequate sound system. Turneja 2005: Sarajevo, Zagreb, Beograd features recordings from these concerts. For unknown reasons, the album does not feature the songs Selma and Da sam pekar which were both performed at the concerts, but the DVD version does.

Each of the original singers of Bijelo dugme had their own set with the most famous songs they sung with the band. Islamović opened the Zagreb and Sarajevo concerts, while Vojičić opened the Belgrade concert, with Bebek always being the third. After the singers' sets, they would sing together with Bregović playing the acoustic guitar for several songs. The concerts would end with an encore where Bebek, Vojičić and Islamović each sang the biggest song they sung.

== Album cover ==
Turneja 2005: Sarajevo, Zagreb, Beograd is one of two Bijelo Dugme album covers (the other one being a cover of their 1977 live album Koncert kod Hajdučke česme) which does not feature the band's logo designed by Dragan S. Stefanović. The medal on the cover of the slipcase is the Yugoslav Order of the People's Hero.

== Track listings ==
All songs written by Goran Bregović, except where noted.

=== CD1 ===
No.	Title	Lyrics	Music	Length
1.	"Lažeš" ("You're Lying")			4:29
2.	"Za Esmu" ("For Esma")			4:23
3.	"Meni se ne spava" ("I Don't Feel Like Sleeping")	Miljenko Žuborski	Goran Bregović	5:02
4.	"Jer kad ostariš" ("Because, When You Grow Old")			4:57
5.	"Da te bogdo ne volim" ("If I Could Only Not Love You")			4:42
6.	"Padaju zvijezde" ("The Stars Are Falling")			4:39
7.	"Aiaio radi radio" ("Aiaio the Radio is on")			3:25
8.	"Nakon svih ovih godina" ("After All These Years")			4:34
9.	"Šta ima novo" ("What's New")			4:57
10.	"Ćiribiribela"			5:12
11.	"Kada odem, kad me ne bude" ("When I Leave, When I'm Gone")			5:05
12.	"Ako ima boga" ("If There Is a God")			5:00
13.	"A i ti me iznevjeri" ("And You Have Let Me Down Too")			4:05
14.	"Napile se ulice" ("The Streets Are Drunk")			3:58
15.	"Ipak poželim neko pismo" ("Still, I Wish For a Letter")			5:03
16.	"Ne spavaj, mala moja, muzika dok svira" ("Don't You Sleep, Baby, When The Music is Playing")			3:07

=== CD2 ===
No.	Title	Lyrics	Music	Length
1.	"Sve će to, mila moja, prekriti ruzmarin, snjegovi i šaš" ("All of That, My Dear, Will be Covered by Rosemary, Snow and Reed")			7:24
2.	"Ako možeš zaboravi" ("Forget, if You Can")			6:12
3.	"Na zadnjem sjedištu moga auta" ("In the Back Seat of My Car")			4:51
4.	"Ha ha ha"			3:50
5.	"Doživjeti stotu" ("Live to Be 100")			3:14
6.	"Sanjao sam noćas da te nemam" ("Last Night I Dream that I Didn't Have You")			8:12
7.	"A milicija trenira trenira strogoću" ("And Militia is Training Strictness")	Duško Trifunović	Goran Bregović	3:06
8.	"Pristao sam biću sve što hoće" ("I Agreed, I'll Be Anything They Want ")	Duško Trifunović	Goran Bregović	3:25
9.	"Loše vino" ("Bad Wine")	Arsen Dedić	Goran Bregović	3:25
10.	"Evo zakleću se" ("Here, I'll Swear")			4:47
11.	"Ružica si bila, sada više nisi" ("You Were Once a Little Rose, Now You Are Not Anymore")			3:50
12.	"Ima neka tajna veza" ("There Is Some Secret Relationship")			3:13
13.	"Tako ti je, mala moja, kad ljubi Bosanac" ("That's How It Is, Baby When You Kiss a Bosnian")			3:49
14.	"Lipe cvatu, sve je isto k'o i lani" ("Linden Trees Are in Bloom, Everything's just like It Used to Be")			4:55
15.	"Đurđevdan je a ja nisam s onom koju volim" ("It's St. George's Day, and I'm Not with the One I Love")	Goran Bregović	Traditional	4:27
16.	"Hajdemo u planine" ("Let's Go to the Mountains")	Ademir Kenović; Goran Bregović; Ismet Arnautalić	Goran Bregović	5:00

== Personnel ==
- Goran Bregović - guitar, acoustic guitar, backing vocals, producer
- Željko Bebek - vocals, acoustic guitar
- Alen Islamović - vocals
- Mladen "Tifa" Vojičić - vocals
- Điđi Jankelić - drums, percussion
- Milić Vukašinović - drums, percussion
- Laza Ristovski - keyboards
- Vlado Pravdić - organ
- Zoran Redžić - bass guitar

=== Additional personnel ===
- Daniela Radkova Aleksandrova - backing vocals
- Ludmila Radkova Traykova - backing vocals
- Klapa Nostalgija - backing vocals
- Wedding & Funeral Band
- Dušan Vasić - engineer
- Nenad Zubak - engineer
- Janez Križaj - mastered by
- Nikša Bratoš - mixed by
- Željko Savić - technician
