= Crna dama =

Studio album by Smak
- Released: 1977
- Recorded: April 1977
- Studio: Morgan Studios, London
- Genre: Progressive rock, jazz rock, blues rock, folk rock, hard rock, psychedelic rock
- Language: Serbo-Croatian
- Label: PGP RTB
- Producer: Martin Levan

Smak chronology
Satelit (1976)	Crna dama (1977)	Black Lady (1978)

Crna dama (Serbian Cyrillic: Црна дама; lit. 'Black Lady') is the second studio album by the Yugoslav band Smak, released in 1977.

== Track listing ==
All music is composed by Radomir Mihajlović "Točak", except where noted.

Side one
No.	Title	Lyrics	Length
1.	"Crna dama" (Black Lady)	Mirko Glišić	3:34
2.	"Stvar ljubavi" (A Matter of Love)	Mirko Glišić	5:09
3.	"Domaći zadatak" (Homework)		7:43

Side two
No.	Title	Lyrics	Music	Length
1.	"'Alo" ('Allo)			4:04
2.	"Tegoba" (Rigor)		Miodrag Petkovski "Miki"	6:46
3.	"Daire" (Tambourine)	Mirko Glišić		3:45
4.	"Plava pesma" (Blue Song)	Mirko Glišić		4:26

== Personnel ==
Smak

- Boris Aranđelović — vocals
- Radomir Mihajlović "Točak" — guitar
- Miodrag Petkovski "Miki" — keyboards
- Zoran Milanović — bass guitar
- Slobodan Stojanović "Kepa" — drums, percussion

Additional personnel

- Harmonium Quartet — strings
- Ben Kennard — cello
- Brian Mack — viola
- Pat Nalling — first violin
- John Knight — second violin
- Perry Morgan — engineer
- Harry Fisher — mastered By
- Maurice Pert — percussion
- Dragan S. Stefanović — photography, artwork, design
- Martin Levan — production
- Dave Harris — recording engineer
- Nigel Green — assistant recording engineer
