= Delfin (EP) =

EP by Smak
- Released: 2012
- Recorded: 2010
- Genre: Hard rock, Alternative metal
- Language: Serbian
- Label: One Records

Smak chronology
Egregor (1999)	Delfin (2012)

Delfin is the second EP by the Serbian rock band Smak, released in 2012.

== Track listing ==
No.	Title	Length
1.	"Delfin" (The Dolphin)	6:01
2.	"Cigansko srce" (Gypsy Heart)	3:28
3.	"Ispiranje" (Ablution)	2:50
4.	"Rapsodija o lepom" (A Rhapsody on Beauty)	7:19

== Personnel ==
- Dejan Najdanović "Najda" – vocals
- Radomir Mihailović "Točak" – guitar
- Mikica Milosavljević – guitar
- Милош Петровић – bass
- Slobodan Stojanović "Kepa"
- Dejan Stojanović Kepa Jr. – drums
