= Jasmin Sokolović =

Bosnian musician, trumpeter (b. 1962)

Jasmin Sokolović (Sarajevo, 19. February 1962) is a Bosnian musician and trumpeter.

Between 1969 and 1977 he attended Elementary School, then (until 1981) Music School in Sarajevo, where he began to learn the trumpet as the main instrument. Between 1982 and 1996 he attended Music Academy and Conservatory Zagreb and Sarajevo under professor Stanko Selak.

In the period between 1977 and 1981 he won two times the first prize in the national competition of young artist of Yugoslavia till 18 years of age. From 1980, started playing in the Sarajevo Opera, the Philharmonic and the Jazz Orchestra of the City of Sarajevo. From 1984 to 1992 he worked to the first solo trumpet in symphony Orchestra, Philharmonic Jazz Orchestra and the Opera Orchestra of the City of Sarajevo. During this period the orchestra was on tour around the world and he got significant recognition as a solo orchestral musician.

He has worked with numerous distinguished conductors such as Zubin Mehta, Claudio Abbado, Yehudi Menuhin, Oskar Danon and many others. Joint cooperation as orchestral solo trumpet player with José Carreras, Ruggero Raimondi, Cecilia Gasdia, Ildiko Komlosi and many other. Since 1992 he works as a Professor of trumpet playing and conductor in Germany where he achieved significant success and recognition in this field. As a conductor in Blasorkester Dabringhausen he won twice the first prize at the national level in Germany.

In his career he collaborated with many musicians such as: Hari Mata Hari, Bijelo Dugme, Haris Džinović, Toma Zdravković, Zdravko Čolić, Dino Merlin and many other musicians throughout Europe. For many years he worked with the Group of Dino with which among other things, participated in the selection of the Eurovision Song Contest.
