= Satelit (EP) =

EP by Smak
- Released: 1976
- Genre: Hard rock, blues rock, progressive rock
- Language: Serbian
- Label: ZKP RTLJ

Smak chronology
Smak (1975)	Satelit (1976)	Crna dama (1977)

Satelit is the first EP by the Serbian band Smak, released in 1976.

== Track listing ==
All lyrics are written by Mirko Glišić; all music is composed by Radomir Mihajlović "Točak".

A side of first vinyl
No.	Title	Length
1.	"Satelit (Satelite)"

B side
No.	Title	Length
1.	"Čoveče, ti si mlad (Man, You Are Young)"

A side of second vinyl
No.	Title	Length
1.	"Šumadijski bluz (Blues Of Šumadija)"

B side
No.	Title	Music	Length
1.	"Slikar sa Pikadilija (Piccadilly Painter)"	Boris Aranđelović, Laza Ristovski

== Personnel ==
- Boris Aranđelović - vocals
- Radomir Mihajlović "Točak" - guitar
- Laza Ristovski - keyboards
- Zoran Milanović - bass
- Slobodan Stojanović "Kepa" - drums, congas, gong
