= Smak Super 45 =

EP by Smak
- Released: 1978
- Genre: Rock, Progressive rock
- Language: Serbian
- Label: PGP-RTB

Smak chronology
Black Lady (1978)	Smak Super 45 (1978)	Stranice našeg vremena (1978)

Smak Super 45 is the first maxi single by the Serbian rock band Smak, released in 1978. The release features the songs "Nevidljive terazije" and "Hitopadeza".

== Track listing ==
All music is composed by Radomir Mihajlović "Točak"

A side of vinyl
No.	Title	Lyrics	Length
1.	"Nevidljive terazije"	Borislav Horvat

B side
No.	Title	Length
1.	"Hitopadeza"
