= Boki Milošević =

Serbian clarinetist

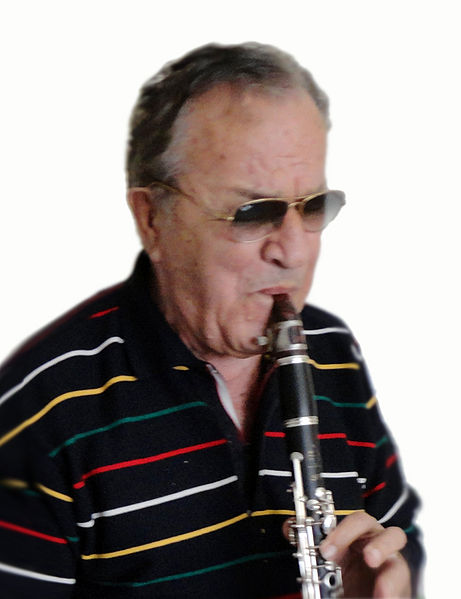
Boki Milošević, 2012

Božidar "Boki" Milošević (Serbian Cyrillic: Божидар "Боки" Милошевић; 31 December 1931 – 15 April 2018) was a Serbian clarinetist.

Milošević was born in Prokuplje, Kingdom of Yugoslavia, now Serbia.

He completed undergraduate and graduate studies of classical music at the Academy of Music in Belgrade, where he studied with Bruno Brun. He mostly played folk music. He was a member of the Association of Musical Artists of Serbia and was the second clarinetist of the Belgrade Philharmonic Orchestra.

== Teaching ==
Božidar Milošević was clarinet teacher at the Josip Slavenski School of Music in Belgrade from 1960 to 1968.

== Personal life and death ==
Božidar Milošević's son, Milan Milošević, is also a clarinetist; he lives and works in Vancouver, British Columbia, Canada.

Milošević died on 15 April 2018 in Belgrade, aged 86.

== Sources ==
- Pedeset godina Fakulteta muzičke umetnosti (Muzičke akademije) 1937-1987, Univerzitet umetnosti u Beogradu, Beograd, 1988
- Plavša, D. (1981): Muzika - Prošlost, sadašnjost, ličnosti, oblici, Izdavačka organizacija "Nota", Knjaževac
- Stojković, Milica. Bila sam svedok: Muzička produkcija RTB 1976-1992. Beograd: RDU Radio-televizija Srbije, 2011.
