= Stranice našeg vremena =

Studio album by Smak
- Released: 1978
- Genre: Rock, Progressive rock
- Language: Serbian
- Label: PGP RTB
- Producer: Barry Hammond

Smak chronology
Smak Super 45 (1978)	Stranice našeg vremena (1978)	Dab in the Middle (1978)

Stranice našeg vremena is the third studio album by the Yugoslav band Smak, released in 1978.

== Track listing ==
A side
No.	Title	Length
1.	"Tendži - Tandži (Tanji - Tanji)"	3:33
2.	"Povedi me s njim (Take Me With Him)"	4:03
3.	"Maht - Tema (Maht - Theme)"	6:10
4.	"The Pages of Our Time"	5:03

B side
No.	Title	Length
1.	"Nebo je samo drum bez dna (The Sky Is Just A Road With No Bottom)"	3:52
2.	"Ulazak u harem (Entrance To The Harem)"	4:02
3.	"Ponoćni lovac (Biska 18) (Midnight Hunter)"	11:11

== Personnel ==
- Boris Aranđelović - vocals
- Radomir Mihajlović "Točak" - guitar
- Tibor Levay - keyboards
- Zoran Milanović - bass
- Slobodan Stojanović "Kepa" - drums

=== Guest ===
- David Moss - Congas, Timbales, Maracas, Castanets, Gong, Cabasa
