= Smak (album) =

Studio album by Smak
- Released: 1975
- Recorded: 9—14 July 1975 at Studio 14 RTV Ljubljana
- Genres: Progressive rock, jazz rock, blues rock, folk rock, hard rock, psychedelic rock
- Language: Serbian
- Label: ZKP RTLJ
- Producer: Ivo Umek

Smak chronology
Smak (1975)	Satelit (1976)

Smak is the debut studio album by the Serbian band Smak, released in 1975 by ZKP RTLJ.

== Track listing ==
All music is composed by Radomir Mihajlović "Točak".

Side one
No.	Title	Lyrics	Length
1.	"Perle" (Beads)	Mirko Glišić	4:00
2.	"Mračni mol" (Dark Pier)	Radomir Mihajlović "Točak"	3:20
3.	"Blues u parku" (Blues in the Park)	Mirko Glišić	7:30
4.	"Biska 2"	Radomir Mihajlović "Točak"	4:25

Side two
No.	Title	Length
1.	"Put od balona (Biska 20)" (Road of Balloons (Biska 20))	19:00

== Personnel ==
Smak

- Boris Aranđelović — vocals
- Radomir Mihajlović "Točak" — acoustic guitar, electric guitar, backing vocals
- Laza Ristovski — keyboards, organ, electric piano, synthesizer, mellotron
- Zoran Milanović — bass guitar
- Slobodan Stojanović "Kepa" — drums, congas, gong

Additional personnel

- Ljubomir Milojević — design
- Drago Hribovšek — engineer
- Peter Čanžek — assistant engineer
- Ivo Umek — production
