= Zajdi, zajdi, jasno sonce =

Song by Aleksandar Sarievski
- Language: Macedonian
- English title: "Set, Set, O Clear Sun"
- Written: Unknown
- Genre: Macedonian folk song
- Songwriter(s): Aleksandar Sarievski

Zajdi, zajdi, jasno sonce (Macedonian: Зајди, зајди, јасно сонце; "Set, Set, O Clear Sun") is a contemporary Macedonian folk song written and composed by Aleksandar Sarievski in the style of newly composed folk. Different versions of the song are sung in other neighbouring Balkan countries.

== Origins ==
Sarievski composed the melody and adapted the text from another source, saying:

The song Zajdi, zajdi, jasno sonce emerged from the folk song Černej, goro, černej, sestro. In listening to that song and occasionally singing it, I came up with the idea to make something similar in terms of content, but with a completely different melody. So, I gradually began to sing the song, which would soon after become very popular everywhere I sung it. That song means a lot to me because it was received well by many individuals interested in folk music, but above all it means a lot to me because it was accepted by the people. Every time I'd go somewhere I think everyone present expected me to sing it.

== Lyrics of the song ==
Lyrics

Зајди, зајди јасно сонце,
зајди помрачи се,
и ти јасна ле месечино,
бегај удави се.

Црнеј горо, црнеј сестро,
двата да црнејме,
ти за твојте лисја ле горо,
јас за мојта младост.

Твојте лисја горо сестро,
пак ќе ти се вратат,
а мојата младост ле горо,
нема да се врати.

Romanized lyrics

Zajdi, zajdi jasno sonce,
zajdi pomrači se,
i ti jasna le mesečino,
begaj udavi se.

Crnej goro, crnje sestro,
dvata da crnejme,
ti za tvojte lisja le goro,
jas za mojta mladost.

Tvojte lisja goro sestro,
pak ḱe ti se vratat,
a mojata mladost le goro,
nema da se vrati.

== Cultural references ==
- Vocals from the song were used in the track Innocence Lost from Phutureprimitive's Searching for Beauty in the Darkest Places Pt 2 studio album.
- The woodwind melody is used in the track "Message for the Queen" from the 300 Original Motion Picture Soundtrack.
- A version of the song was featured in the soundtrack for Battlefield 1.
