= Martin Levan =

Martin Levan is a music producer and sound engineer who, during the 1980s and 1990s, designed the sound for many of the major musicals in the West End of London.

== Early career ==
Levan began his career as the tea boy at Morgan Studios, London in 1971, rising to become an engineer and producer. His early album credits include John Martyn's Grace and Danger, Ralph McTell's Water of Dreams, Iron Maiden's eponymous album, Neil Ardley's Kaleidoscope of Rainbows and Harmony of the Spheres, Colosseum II's Wardance, Andrew Lloyd Webber's Variations and Requiem, Gary Boyle's The Dancer and Electric Glide and Barbara Thompson's Paraphernalia.

== Sound Design ==
Levan's career developed in a different direction when, in 1982, Andrew Lloyd Webber contracted him to supervise the sound design for the original production of the musical Song and Dance at the Palace Theatre, London. He also produced a live recording of the first night performance. The impact of the sound production for the show led to him designing the sound for a number of musicals throughout the world over the next two decades, and regularly collaborating with Lloyd Webber.

With Lloyd Webber, he worked on the original 1984 London and 1987 Broadway productions of Starlight Express, the 1985 original Broadway production of Song and Dance, the 1986 London and 1988 Broadway productions of The Phantom of the Opera. In all productions of the show, the overture is partially pre-recorded, with the orchestra playing along with a track originally created by Levan and Rod Argent using a Yamaha DX5 keyboard, at Rod's home studio.

He also collaborated with Lloyd Webber on the original 1989 London production of Aspects of Love, the 1991 revival of Joseph and the Amazing Technicolor Dreamcoat at the London Palladium, the original 1993 London and 1994 Broadway productions of Sunset Boulevard, the original 1998 London production of Whistle Down the Wind, the original 2000 London production of The Beautiful Game and international productions of Cats.

His other Sound Design credits include Little Shop of Horrors, Kiss of the Spider Woman, Blondel, Carrie, The Baker's Wife, Show Boat and Lautrec.

In 1988, while preparing the design for Aspects of Love, he developed the 'A-B System' to combat phase problems associated with the conventional method of combining multiple radio microphones systems on stage. Phase related interference patterns resulting in coloration and distortion in the sound system had hitherto been unavoidable but the use of the 'A-B System' effectively eliminated this phenomenon providing the audience with a much more natural, clearer and more focussed sound.

More recently, in 2024, Levan collaborated with Broadway and West End sound designer Gareth Owen to present a series of lectures on sound design at London's PLASA show. In conversation they discussed the evolution of modern sound design and how many of the original techniques developed by Levan are still practiced by Owen today.

== Awards ==
His original Broadway cast recording of Cats won a Grammy Award. Other awards include an NAACP Theatre Award for Best Sound Director for The Phantom of the Opera, a Los Angeles Drama Critics Circle Award for Best Sound Design for Sunset Boulevard and a Jessie Richardson Theatre Award for Outstanding Design Team Achievement for Show Boat.

== Return to the Recording Studio ==
In 1998, Martin conceived and built the Red Kite Studio music recording facility in Carmarthenshire, Wales. He continues to produce and record there.
