= Radomir Mihailović =

- Also known as: Točak
- Born: 13 June 1950 (age 74); Čačak, PR Serbia, FPR Yugoslavia
- Genres: Rock, Blues-rock, Progressive rock, Hard rock, Instrumental rock, Jazz, Jazz rock
- Occupation(s): Musician, Songwriter
- Instrument: Guitar
- Years active: 1960s – present
- Labels: PGP RTB, Suzy, ZKP RTLJ, Bellaphon, Sorabia disk, Komuna, Vans, Raglas Records, RTV S, A Records, PGP RTS

Radomir Mihailović (Serbian Cyrillic: Радомир Михаиловић; born 13 June 1950), also known as Točak (wheel in English) is a Serbian guitarist. He is best known as the guitarist for the Serbian and formerly Yugoslav Smak.

== Biography ==
Mihailović was born on 13 July 1950 in Čačak Serbia, SFR Yugoslavia. He started playing various stringed instruments at 5 years old, to finally commit to the guitar at the age of 9. In his early youth, he was a member of a band from Čačak, called Dečaci sa Morave (Boys from Morava).

In 1970, he played frequently in various clubs in Belgium. Not long after, in 1971 he formed Smak (Eng. Endtime), a rock band from Kragujevac, Serbia, which would become one of the most popular bands in the region, being widely considered as one of the best Yugoslav bands of all time. He is the leading composer and guitarist for the band. Their first full-length album, Smak, was released in 1975. It was a major success, and followed up by what many considered their best record, Crna dama (eng.Black Lady), in 1977. The album was recorded in Morgan Studios, and produced by Martin Levan, a famous London producer, who, among others, worked on Iron Maiden's first album. The English version of the album was also released in 1978, called "Black Lady". These two albums showcased the scope of the band, which had incorporated various musical styles, such as blues, progressive rock, psychedelic rock, jazz rock, and the ethnic music from the region. Mihailović's unique virtuous style of playing is a big part of the band's sound. He plays the electric guitar with fingers, rather than with a pick.

He recorded a number of solo singles, and published one solo album. He also composed a highly-acclaimed soundtrack for the movie "Byzantine Blue", receiving the Crystal Prysm award.

He runs his own school of guitar in Belgrade.

== Discography ==
=== Solo ===
==== Studio albums ====
- R.M. Točak (ZKP RTLJ, 1976)
- Vizantijsko plavo (Vans, 1993)

==== Live albums ====
- RMTocak trio Live in Skopje `84
- RMTocak trio Live in Zagreb `87
- TEK Live in Nish 1994

==== Singles ====
- "Mantilija" / "Specijalka" (Jugodisk 1980)
- "Marš..." / "...na Drinu" (PGP RTB 1984)

== See also ==
- Serbian rock
- SFR Yugoslav Pop and Rock scene
