= Zele Lipovača =

Bosnian and Yugoslav guitarist

Sead Lipovača
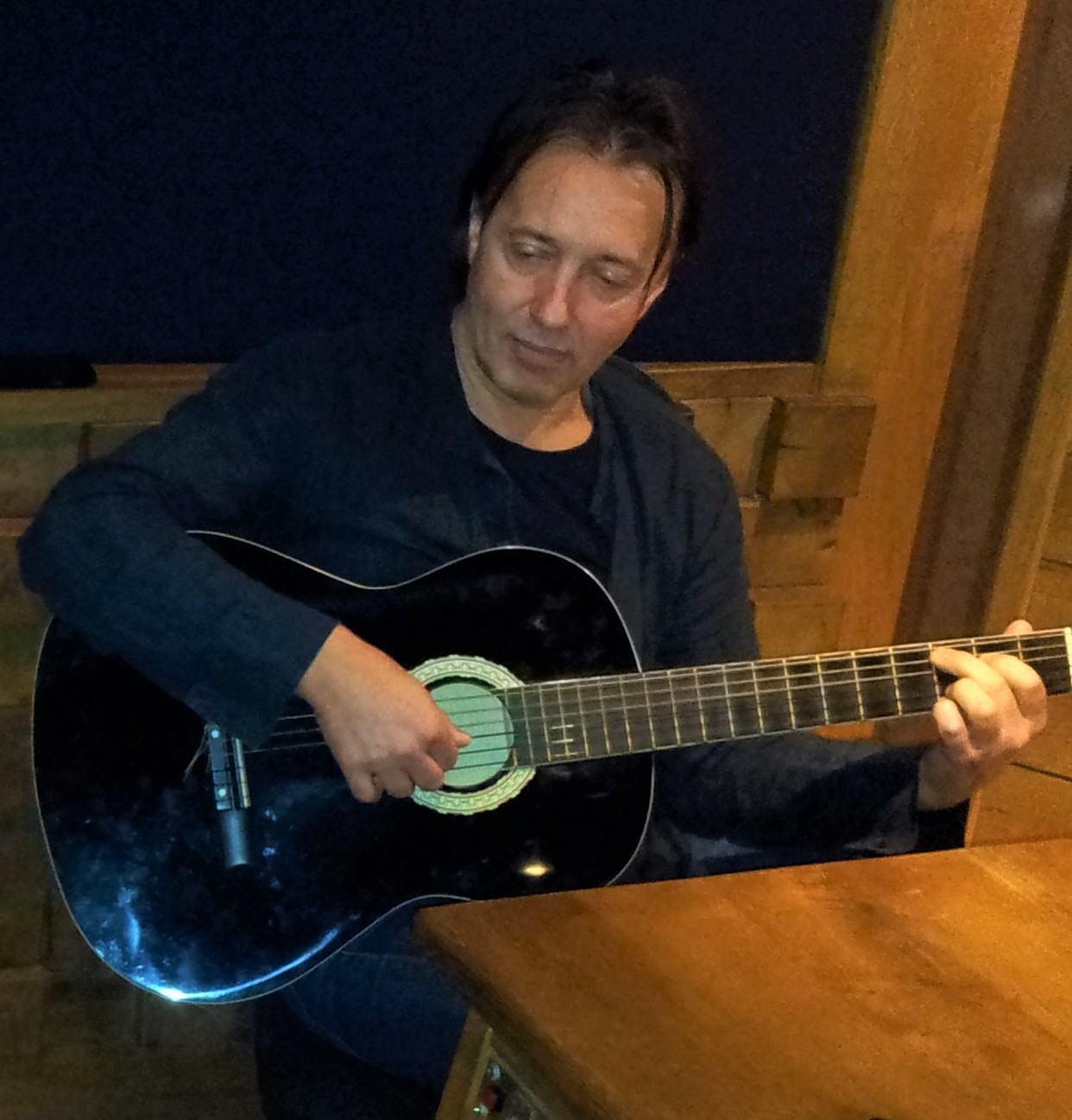
- Lipovača in 2014

Background information
- Also known as: Zele
- Born: Sead Lipovača; 31 August 1955 (age 71); Bihać, PR Bosnia and Herzegovina, FPR Yugoslavia
- Genres: Hard rock; heavy metal; glam metal; instrumental rock
- Occupations: Guitarist; songwriter; music producer
- Instrument: Guitar
- Years active: 1974–present
- Labels: Jugoton, Diskoton, Logo Records, Nimfa Sound, Croatia Records, One Records

Sead "Zele" Lipovača (Bosnian pronunciation: [lîpoʋatʃa]; born 31 August 1955) is a Bosnian and Yugoslav rock musician, songwriter and music producer, currently based in Zagreb, Croatia, best known as the guitarist and leader of the popular hard rock and heavy metal band Divlje Jagode.

Lipovača started his career in mid-1970s, as guitarist for several Zagreb-based bands, before he formed Divlje Jagode in 1977. With Divlje Jagode he achieved nationwide popularity, the band also having a short-lived international career under the name Wild Strawberries. Throughout the band's career, Lipovača has remained the leader and the only mainstay member of the band. He has released 13 studio albums, a live album and a number of compilations with the group.

In addition to leading Divlje Jagode, Lipovača has released two solo albums and has cooperated as a songwriter and producer with a number of acts from the region of former Yugoslavia.

== Early life ==
Lipovača was born 31 August 1955 in Bihać. After graduating from high school, he moved to Zagreb for his studies of external trade.

== Musical career ==
=== Early career (mid 1970s–1977) ===
Lipovača started his career in mid-1970s, performing with Zagreb-based bands Biseri (The Pearls) and Selekcija (Selection), before joining the band Zenit (Zenith). Zenit reached the peak of their career with their performance at the 1974 edition of the BOOM Festival, held in Tivoli Hall in Ljubljana, with the live version of their song "Stara kuća je prazna" ("The Old House Is Empty") appearing on the live album Boom Pop Festival Ljubljana '74, recorded at the event.

=== Divlje Jagode (1977–1990, 1994–present) ===
In 1977, Zenit former members Lipovača, vocalist Anto "Toni" Janković and bass guitarist Nihad Jusufhodžić formed the band Divlje Jagode in Sarajevo with keyboardist Mustafa "Muc" Ismailovski and drummer Adonis Dokuzović. The group soon managed to sign a contract with Yugoslavia's biggest record label Jugoton, attracting the attention of the Yugoslav public and the media with their early singles featuring hard rock ballads and their 1978 debut self-titled album,. Their second studio album Stakleni hotel (Glass Hotel), released in 1981, marked their complete shift towards heavy metal. On Staleni hotel, Lipovača took part in the production for the first time, co-producing the album with Enco Lesić. After the album release, vocalist Anto "Toni" Janković left the band amicalbly, bass guitarist Alen Islamović taking over the vocal duties. With the albums Motori (Motorcycles, 1982), Čarobnjaci (Wizards, 1983) and Vatra (Fire, 1985), the band achieved large mainstream popularity in Yugoslavia, which provided them with a contract with a British record label and an opportunity to record an album for the international market. In 1986, the group moved to London, England, where they started working on their international career under the name Wild Strawberries, adopting a more glam metal image and recording an English language album. However, doubting the success of the band's venture in England, Islamović accepted the invitation from Goran Bregović, the leader of the most popular Yugoslav band Bijelo Dugme, to join his group as a replacement for the vocalist Mladen Vojičić "Tifa", and the album Wild Strawberries was released internationally without much promotion. After a hiatus, Lipovača reformed the group in Yugoslavia with Bijelo Dugme's former frontman Vojičić as the vocalist, recording the 1988 album Konji (Horses). In 1989, the band was joined by former Osmi Putnik vocalist Zlatan Stipišić "Džibo". Despite making demo recording, the lineup featuring Stipišić never made any official releases, and Divlje Jagode disbanded in 1990. In 1994, Lipovača reformed the group, long-time bass guitarist Zlatan Čehić taking over the vocals. The band's following releases, Labude, kad rata ne bude (Swan, When There's No More War, 1994) and Sto vjekova (Hundred Centuries, 1996), the latter recorded with vocalist Žanil "Žak" Tataj, presented the band with a slightly softer, more ballad-oriented sound. With the 2003 album Od neba do neba (From Sky to Sky), recorded with vocalist Pero Galić, the band reestablished their popularity in the region of former Yugoslavia.

=== Solo albums ===
After the disbandment of Divlje Jagode in 1990 and the outbreak of Yugoslav Wars in 1991, Lipovača moved to Germany, London and, eventually, Zagreb, recording his first solo album, entitled Magic Love and released in 1993. The album featured former Divlje Jagode members Zlatan Čehić (bass guitar) and Nasko Budimlić (drums), while on vocals was former Jersey member Žanil "Žak" Tataj. The album featured English language lyrics, written by Tataj and former Divlje Jagode member Zlatan Stipišić, and was produced by Nikša Bratoš, who also recorded keyboard sections, and provided backing vocals. The song "Can't Stop" featured Tina Rupčić on vocals, while the song "She Is Gone" featured former Kongres member Emir Cenić on vocals.

In 2016, Lipovača released his second solo album, Internal Waves of Love, featuring mostly instrumental compositions, with several tracks featuring former Black Sabbath member Tony Martin on vocals.

=== Collaborations ===
In the late 1970s, during Divlje Jagode hiatus caused by the members' mandatory stints in the Yugoslav army, Lipovača, together with lyricist Marina Tucaković, became the spiritus movens for the disco group Mirzino Jato. He produced Mladen Vojičić's 1995 solo album Dani bez tebe (Days Without You), also authoring part of the album songs. He produced, wrote music arrangements and played bass guitar on the 1997 album Istina (Truth) by Croatian Christian rock band Glasnici Istine (Messengers of Truth). He worked as a producer, arranger and author of a part of the material in the edition Tri hafiza (Three Hafizes), recorded by singers Burhan Šaban, Aziz Alili and Mensur Malkić. He composed songs for the album Ja sam vjetar zaljubljeni (I'm a Wind that's in Love) by Bosnian pop singer Deen. He produced albums of Islamic spiritual music Hori, hori vasiona (The Universe Sings in Choir, 2002) and Ti si vjetar, ja sam plamen (You Are a Wind, I Am a Flame) by the Zagreb-based female choir Arabeske (The Arabesques). For the various artists album Hronično neumorni (Chronically Restless), featuring songs composed on lyrics by poet Milan B. Popović, he recorded the song "Poeta umire tiho" ("Poet Dies Quietly").

== Equipment ==
Lipovača owns a large collection of guitars. He uses a Gibson Les Paul from 1959. He also uses an Ovation 12-string guitar. Apart from these guitars, he has a collection of Fender, Charvel, Jackson and other guitars.

He is most often seen performing with a Fender Stratocaster from 1967 which he modified heavily. The guitar has Dimarzio Superdistortion bridge pickup and some Fender middle pickup. Lipovača also added a Floyd Rose tremolo on the guitar.

He uses Marshall and Mesa Boogie amplifiers. He uses an Eventide 3000 harmonizer and Whammy effects pedal. He sometimes uses a Dunlop Cry Baby wah-wah pedal.

== Personal life ==
Lipovača lived in Sarajevo until the outbreak of the Bosnian War, after which he moved to Germany, London and, eventually, Zagreb, where he still resides. He is married and has a daughter.

== Legacy ==
In 2000, Divlje Jagode song "Jedina moja" was polled No.89 on Rock Express Top 100 Yugoslav Rock Songs of All Times list.

== Discography ==
=== With Divlje Jagode ===
==== Studio albums ====
- Divlje jagode (1978)
- Stakleni hotel (1981)
- Motori (1982)
- Čarobnjaci (1983)
- Vatra (1985)
- Wild Strawberries (as Wild Strawberries, 1987)
- Konji (1988)
- Labude, kad rata ne bude (1994)
- Sto vjekova (1997)
- Od neba do neba (2003)
- Biodinamička ljubav (2013)
- Jukebox (2020)
- Prati moje stare tragove (2024)

==== Live albums ====
- Live in Beograd (2023)

==== Compilations ====
- Najbolje (1986)
- Sarajevo, ti i ja (1993)
- Antologija 1 (1995)
- Antologija 2 (1995)
- The Very Best Of: Let na drugi svijet (2004)
- The Ultimate Collection (2008)
- The Love Collection: Najljepše ljubavne pjesme (2011)
- Greatest Hits (2015)

==== Box sets ====
- Collection (2006)
- Original Album Collection Vol.1 (2018)
- Original Album Collection Vol.2 (2018)

==== Video albums ====
- Divlje Jagode (2004)

==== Singles ====
- "Rock 'n' Roll" / "Jedina moja" (1977)
- "Moj dilbere" / "Prijatelj" (1977)
- "Patkica" / "Kad bi vi gospođo" (1978)
- "Nemam ništa protiv" / "Bit' će bolje!" (1979)
- "Konji" / "Turski marš" (1988)
- "Marija" (2003)
- "Dobro došla ljubavi / Marija" (2003)
- "Piramida" (2006)
- "Evo banke cigane moj" (2016)

=== Solo ===
==== Studio albums ====
- Magic Love (1993)
- Internal Waves of Love (2016)
