= Pljuni i zapjevaj moja Jugoslavijo =

Studio album by Bijelo Dugme
- Released: November 1986
- Recorded: RTV Sarajevo Studio I, Sarajevo; Jugoton Studio, Zagreb
- Genres: Rock; pop rock; folk rock
- Length: 37:59
- Label: Diskoton / Kamarad
- Producer: Goran Bregović

Bijelo Dugme chronology
Bijelo Dugme (1984)	Pljuni i zapjevaj moja Jugoslavijo (1986)	Mramor, kamen i željezo (1987)

Pljuni i zapjevaj moja Jugoslavijo (transl. "Spit and Sing, My Yugoslavia") is the eighth studio album by Yugoslavian rock band Bijelo Dugme, released in 1986.

Pljuni i zapjevaj moja Jugoslavijo is the band's first album recorded with vocalist Alen Islamović, who came to the band as replacement for Mladen Vojičić "Tifa". It is also the band's first album since 1977 live album Koncert kod Hajdučke česme to feature keyboardist Laza Ristovski as the official member of the band and the band's last studio album to feature keyboardist Vlado Pravdić.

The album was polled in 1998 as the 53rd on the list of 100 greatest Yugoslav Rock and Pop albums in the book YU 100: najbolji albumi jugoslovenske rok i pop muzike (YU 100: The Best Albums of Yugoslav Pop and Rock Music).

== Background and recording ==
=== Personnel changes ===
==== New singer: Alen Islamović ====
Divlje Jagode vocalist Alen Islamović, who took over as Bijelo Dugme's singer in early fall 1986, had been unsuccessfully pursued two years earlier by the band's leader Goran Bregović in the immediate aftermath of long-time vocalist Željko Bebek's spring 1984 departure from the band. Unsure about volatile interpersonal relations within the band and fearing Bebek's possible return into the fold, Islamović had decided to turn the offer down at the time and stay with Divlje Jagode; twenty-three-year-old upstart Mladen "Tifa" Vojičić thus became Bijelo Dugme's new vocalist, recording only one studio album, 1984's Bijelo Dugme, with the band. Due to pressures of professional obligations, sudden fame, and media scandal that revealed his LSD usage, Vojičić left Bijelo Dugme after only a year—at which point Divlje Jagode's Islamović once again got approached about joining. This time, Divlje Jagode were based out of London, pursuing an international career under the modified name Wild Strawberries. Doubting Divlje Jagode's international prospects, 29-year-old Islamović decided to take the offer this time, leaving Wild Strawberries and returning to Yugoslavia to join Bijelo Dugme. Talking about the second vocalist change in two years and the band's personnel issues in general, Bregović stated at the time:

Fuck singing, and fuck the singer too. What's important is the kind of person he is. The biggest issue in Dugme is can we work together or not. Everything else is easy. I'm very satisfied with Alen. My band is healthy. We've had enough of drunks and drug addicts.

==== Ristovski returns as an official member ====
Keyboardist Laza Ristovski, who had left Bijelo Dugme in 1978, first returned as guest for the band's 1984 self-titled album's recording sessions before rejoining as a full-fledged member following the album's December 1984 release. Pljuni i zapjevaj moja Jugoslavijo thus became the first Bijelo Dugme release since 1977 live album Koncert kod Hajdučke česme to feature Ristovski as an official member. For the first time in Bijelo Dugme's history, the lineup included two keyboardists: Ristovski and Vlado Pravdić.

=== Yugoslavism ===
Pljuni i zapjevaj moja Jugoslavijo features similar Balkan folk-infused pop rock sound as Bijelo Dugme, and was similarly inspired by Yugoslavism within communist and socialist patriotic framework, containing numerous references to the Communist League (SKJ)-defined Yugoslav unity as well as the lyrics on the inner sleeve printed in both Cyrillic and Latin alphabets.

==== (Self-)censorship ====
Due to pressure from Yugoslav communist authorities, Bregović would eventually give up on implementing some of the ideas he had originally envisioned for the album.

When he began conceptualizing it, Bregović wanted Yugoslavism-inspired Pljuni i zapjevaj moja Jugoslavijo to contain contributions from individuals known for holding political views outside of SFR Yugoslavia's official ideology as espoused by the SKJ, the only legally allowed political party in the country. To that end, he and the band's manager Raka Marić approached three such individuals who had at that point been effectively proscribed from public discourse in Yugoslavia for over a decade:

- pop singer Vice Vukov, who had represented SFR Yugoslavia at the 1963 Eurovision Song Contest before seeing his career prospects marginalized due to being branded a Croatian nationalist as a result of his association with the Croatian Spring political movement,
- painter and experimental filmmaker Mića Popović, associated with Yugoslav Black Wave film movement, who got a dissident reputation due to his paintings and early 1960s films,
- politician and diplomat Koča Popović, who despite a prominent World War II role with the Partisan resistance guerrillas as the 1st Proletarian Brigade commander—an engagement that in the post-war communist Yugoslavia earned him the Order of the People's Hero medal followed by high political and diplomatic appointments—nevertheless got silently removed from public life in 1972 after coming out in support of Latinka Perović and Marko Nikezić, leading figures of the so-called "Serbian liberals", a liberal faction within the SKJ's Serbian branch.

Bregović's idea was to have Vukov sing the ballad "Ružica si bila, sada više nisi" ("You Were Once a Little Rose"). However, despite Vukov accepting, the plan never got implemented after the band's manager Marić got detained and interrogated by the police at the Sarajevo Airport upon returning from Zagreb where he had met with Vukov.

Mića Popović's contribution to the album was to be his Dve godine garancije (A Two-Year Warranty) painting featuring a seemingly down-on-his-luck pensioner sleeping on a park bench while using pages of Politika newspaper as blanket to warm himself, which Bregović wanted to use as the album cover. When approached, Mića Popović also accepted though warning Bregović of possible problems the musician would likely face. The album ended up featuring a photograph of Chinese social realist ballet on the cover.

I made Bregović aware of Koča's phenomenal singing. Spanish songs, classic French chansons, the man definitely had musical sense. However, Koča's a serious, cerebral guy and I had my doubts whether he'd accept... and I told Bregović as much. So, I reached out to Koča to relay Bregović's offer, and, sure enough, Koča would have none of it. However, Goran wasn't deterred, saying: "Alright, find me another old communist revolutionary then. Anyone will do". So I contacted Tempo who of all of them was actually the worst musically. Then, Goran and I went down to Reževići where Tempo lived. We got to Tempo's house and as we approached it, he greeted us by singing the song. He had been practicing already.

— Milomir Marić in 2017 on the circumstances of Svetozar Vukmanović Tempo's appearance on the album.

Finally, Koča Popović was reportedly somewhat receptive to the idea of participating on the album, but still turned the offer down.

==== Plan B: Svetozar Vukmanović Tempo ====
Eventually, under pressure from the band's record label, Diskoton, Bregović gave up on his original idea and turned to alternative solutions.

Sticking to the overall theme of socialist-communist Yugoslavism, he decided to secure at least one aging pre-World War II Yugoslav revolutionary's appearance on the album. Reaching out to surviving individuals of that ilk was done through Duga journalist and writer Milomir Marić who had been known to keep contact with many of them as part of the preparatory work for his upcoming book Deca komunizma (Children of Communism). Bregović was able to get seventy-three-year-old Svetozar Vukmanović Tempo to agree, visiting him in his Reževići home and arranging for Tempo to travel to Sarajevo where—backed by the Ljubica Ivezić Orphanage choir—he recorded the old revolutionary song "Padaj silo i nepravdo" ("Fall, (Oh) Force and Injustice").

== Track listing ==
All songs written by Goran Bregović, except where noted.

No.	Title	Lyrics	Music	Length
1.	"Pljuni i zapjevaj moja Jugoslavijo" ("Spit and Sing, My Yugoslavia" (Note: Contains intro of Padaj silo i nepravdo ("Fall, (Oh) Force and Injustice"), a traditional song))			5:06
2.	"Zamisli" ("Imagine")			4:12
3.	"Noćas je k'o lubenica pun mjesec iznad Bosne" ("Tonight there's a Watermelon-like Full Moon over Bosnia")			6:07
4.	"Te noći kad umrem, kad odem, kad me ne bude" ("That Night When I Die, When I Leave, When I'm Gone")			4:37
5.	"A i ti me iznevjeri" ("And You Have Let Me Down Too")			4:03
6.	"Zar ne vidiš da pravim budalu od sebe" ("Can't You See I'm Making a Fool Out of Myself")			3:36
7.	"Hajdemo u planine" ("Let's Go to the Mountains")	Ademir Kenović; Goran Bregović; Ismet Arnautalić	Goran Bregović	4:36
8.	"Pjesma za malu pticu" ("Song for a Little Bird")			3:50
9.	"Ružica si bila, sada više nisi" ("You Were Once a Little Rose, Now You Are Not Anymore")			3:47

== Personnel ==
- Goran Bregović - guitar, producer
- Alen Islamović - vocals
- Zoran Redžić - bass guitar
- Ipe Ivandić - drums
- Vlado Pravdić - keyboards
- Laza Ristovski - keyboards

=== Additional personnel ===
- Svetozar Vukmanović Tempo - vocals (on track 1)
- Amila Sulejmanović - backing vocals
- Amela - backing vocals
- Zumreta Midžić "Zuzi Zu" - backing vocals
- Nenad Stefanović Japanac - bass guitar
- Sinan Alimanović - keyboards
- Slobodan Sokolović - trombone
- Branko Podbrežnički - recorded by, mixed by
- Damir Begović - recorded by, mixed by
- Vlado Perić - design

== Reception ==
The album's biggest hits turned out to be "Hajdemo u planine", "Noćas je k'o lubenica pun mjesec iznad Bosne", "A i ti me iznevjeri" and ballads "Te noći kad umrem, kad odem, kad me ne bude" and "Ružica si bila, sada više nisi". The subsequent promotional tour was also very successful with sold-out sports arenas across Yugoslavia.

=== Bregović vs. Dragan Kremer ===
Large section of the critics, however, disliked Pljuni i zapjevaj moja Jugoslavijo. In his Danas review, Dragan Kremer drew parallels between the developing economic and political crisis in SFR Yugoslavia and what he sees to be the band's ongoing creative crisis:

Unfortunately, what makes this album so 'Yugoslav' mostly has to do with the crisis and lack of criteria, which are no longer possible to hide.

In 1987, Kremer went further while appearing as guest on TV Sarajevo's show Mit mjeseca (Myth of the Month), a programme pitting Yugoslav rock critics against the country's rock stars—allowing critics to directly pose questions to musicians sitting across from them in the same studio. In the case of Kremer's appearance, however, Bregović wasn't in the studio due to being on tour—Kremer's taped questions were thus shown to Bregović while his reaction was filmed. Expressing his dislike of the band's new album, Kremer looked into the camera and addressed Bregović directly:

As a man who adores records with an almost fetishist passion, I hate what I'm about to say and do, but I feel compelled to [still go ahead with it] as means of posing a question. All great authors usually have the same answer to this question, which is that all their works, regardless of type, are equally dear to them and equally good, but — is it possible that this album is your [Bregović's] ugliest and dumbest work?

Upon stating the above, Kremer tore up the Pljuni i zapjevaj moja Jugoslavijo album cover. A visibly angry Bregović reacted by cursing under his breath and launching into an insult-laden tirade directed at Kramer:

It's hard, even for a fool, to harbour ambitions of being liked by everyone, especially by these kinds of fat little pigs with sideburns who probably still masturbate on a regular basis in their forties. Even asking me to answer this pile of imbecilic questions, I mean.... But there's something that doesn't make sense here: we're about to go on a tour with 400,000 copies of this album already sold, which guys like this crap on regularly. So, either the people are fools, which would make what this guy's saying right or I'm still better at writing songs than he is at writing reviews".

The incident got a lot of attention in the Yugoslav media at the time with the angle of usually calm and collected Bregović losing his temper being the focus.

=== Other ===
Vukmanović's appearance on the record gained attention of The Guardian, which described this move as "some sort of Bregović's coup d'état".

In terms of individual tracks and their respective melodies, some in Yugoslavia have noted similarities between "Pljuni i zapjevaj moja Jugoslavijo" and Survivor's 1982 hit "Eye of the Tiger" as well as between "Zamisli" and Red Hot Chili Peppers' 1985 track "Jungle Man".

== Legacy ==
=== "New Partisans" ===
Alongside Plavi Orkestar's Smrt fašizmu!, Merlin's Teško meni sa tobom (a još teže bez tebe), and Hari Mata Hari's Ne bi te odbranila ni cijela Jugoslavija Pljuni i zapjevaj, moja Jugoslavijo has occasionally been categorized as part of New Partisans, a mid-1980s collection of albums by Sarajevo-based bands, featuring sound centered on the Balkan folk-inspired pop rock music as well as containing either direct lyrical/visual references or allusions to Yugoslavism within communist and socialist patriotic framework.

The term New Partisans was introduced during fall 1986 by Plavi Orkestar's manager Malkolm Muharem, during Smrt fašizmu!'s promotional cycle as means of promoting his clients' latest release and potentially jump starting another (sub)cultural movement, similar to what he had participated in achieving three years earlier with the New Primitives. Unlike the New Primitive bands that all came from similar background and were of the same generation, the supposed New Partisan bands were much more disparate. Though the New Partisans never took off as a coherent movement, the term was nevertheless picked up by numerous Yugoslav journalists who continue to use it when describing various phases in Bijelo Dugme's, Dino Merlin's, Plavi Orkestar's and Hari Mata Hari's respective careers.

=== Accolades and retrospective reaction ===
In addition to its successful commercial performance, Pljuni i zapjevaj moja Jugoslavijo made a number of Yugoslav pop-rock all-time lists in different categories over the decades since its release.

In the 1998 book YU 100: najbolji albumi jugoslovenske rok i pop muzike, Pljuni i zapjevaj moja Jugoslavijo was ranked 53rd on the list of 100 Greatest Yugoslav Rock and Pop Albums.

In 2015, Pljuni i zapjevaj moja Jugoslavijo album cover was ranked 3rd on the 100 Greatest Album Covers of Yugoslav Rock list published by web magazine Balkanrock.

Furthermore, the album gained retrospective significance in the context of the breakup of Yugoslavia and Yugoslav Wars. In 2016, looking back on Goran Bregović's overall career and specifically Pljuni i zapjevaj moja Jugoslavijo within it, Politika columnist Aleksandar Apostolovski wistfully opined that "due to seeing Yugoslavia as an inseparable part of his being, Bregović was convinced his own Partisan aesthetic dressed up in rock'n'roll arrangements, with even the Communist International's enforcer Svetozar Vukmanović Tempo taking part on the microphone, would stop the country's disintegration".

Almost 40 years after its release, the album's title song "Pljuni i zapjevaj moja Jugoslavijo"'s Yugoslavist message aroused controversy in Croatia in August 2024 during Bijelo Dugme's 50th anniversary reunion tour. Following the band's concert outside of Split's Porat club on 31 August 2024 in front of 10 to 15 thousand fans—due to taking issue with the band singer Alen Islamović's act of singing the "Pljuni i zapjevaj moja Jugoslavijo" song while the flag of Yugoslavia was simultaneously being shown on the LED display behind him—a Zagreb-based veterans' organization, Defenders of Vukovar (Udruga zagrebački dragovoljci branitelji Vukovara), filed a criminal investigation request with Croatia's State Attorney's Office. Basing their grievance on the Council of Europe resolutions 1481 and 2819, the group sought punishment for the concert organizers "in accordance with Croatia's criminal code" while also demanding a persona non grata status for Islamović in Croatia due to "promoting a defunct Communist creation that hasn't existed for 34 years now [Yugoslavia] and a symbol [Yugoslav flag] used for destruction of Croatia". The group's criminal investigation request goes on to state that "Communism is a criminal regime responsible for suffering, mass torture, and murder of millions while the bloody petokraka is its criminal symbol". Furthermore, contradictory reports appeared in the Balkan press regarding the said Split crowd's reaction to the "Pljuni i zapjevaj moja Jugoslavijo" song with some outlets reporting that its performance "aroused jeers and boos" and others stating that it was "met with a big round of applause".

In the wake of the August 2024 "Pljuni i zapjevaj moja Jugoslavijo" controversy in Croatia during which he claimed to be receiving "nationalist and chauvinistic online threats", different outlets reached out for comment to Alen Islamović who, after deflecting and deferring to bandleader Goran Bregović via stating "I'm just a worker who's singing in the Bijelo Dugme company owned by Mr. Bregović" eventually briefly stated his opinion that "Pljuni i zapjevaj moja Jugoslavijo" is a "rock parody of the old times".

=== Covers ===
Hit tracks off Pljuni i zapjevaj moja Jugoslavijo—primarily "Ružica si bila" and "A i ti me iznevjeri"—saw a number of covers, mostly by performers from the newly-established, post-Yugoslav countries. Additionally, Bregović himself repackaged some of the songs for his collaborations with Iggy Pop and Sezen Aksu.

- Serbian folk singer Ana Bekuta recorded a cover of "A i ti me iznevjeri" on her 1993 album Pitaš me kako živim (You're Asking Me How I Live).
- In 1993, Bregović composed the soundtrack for Emir Kusturica's surrealist drama Arizona Dream, including a new version of "Hajdemo u planine" titled "Get The Money" with English language lyrics and sung by Iggy Pop.
- Serbian ensemble Fejat Sejdić Trumpet Orchestra recorded a cover of "Hajdemo u planine" on their 1994 album Na Dragačevskom saboru orkestara u Guči (On the Guča Trumpet Festival).
- Turkish pop singer Sezen Aksu recorded covers of "Te noći kad umrem, kad odem, kad me ne bude", "A i ti me iznevjeri", and "Ružica si bila, sada više nisi" with Turkish lyrics—titled "Allah'ın Varsa", "Kasım Yağmurları", and "Gül", respectively—on her 1997 Bregović-produced album Düğün ve Cenaze.
- Croatian pop singer Alka Vuica recorded a cover of "Ružica si bila, sada više nisi", entitled "Ružica", on her 2001 album Profesionalka (Professional Girl).
- Serbian folk singer Usnija Redžepova recorded a cover of "A i ti me iznevjeri" on her 2007 album Oko Niša kiša (Rain around Niš).
- Bosnian and Yugoslav rock band Teška Industrija recorded a cover of "A i ti me iznvjeri" on their 2010 album Bili smo raja (We Were Pals).
- Bosnian and Yugoslav pop singer Zuzi Zu, who sung backing vocals on Pljuni i zapjevaj moja Jugoslavijo, recorded a cover of "Ružica si bila", releasing it as a single in 2011.
