= Vatra (album) =

Studio album by Divlje Jagode
- Released: April 1985
- Recorded: 14 November–28 December 1984 at Studio RTV Sarajevo, Sarajevo, Bosnia and Herzegovina
- Genre: Hard rock, heavy metal
- Length: 34:39
- Label: Diskoton
- Producer: Theo Werdin

Divlje Jagode chronology
Čarobnjaci (1983)	Vatra (1985)	Wild Strawberries (1987)

Vatra (English: Fire) is the fifth studio album by the Yugoslav and Bosnian heavy metal band Divlje Jagode. The album was recorded at Studio RTV Sarajevo, Sarajevo, Bosnia and Herzegovina from November to December 1984, and mixed at Music Paark Studio in Bad Homburg vor der Höhe, Germany in February 1985 and was released in April 1985. It was the first time that Alen Islamović made an album just as vocal as he was before and vocalist and bassist also. The album contained nine songs with a real glam and hair metal sound, but was also influenced by the sound of Black Sabbath and Saxon, with the occasional Judas Priest riff. Islamovic wrote the lyrics for most songs, and the album had one song in English titled "Touch Me Little Girl", written by their producer Theo Werdin.

== Track listing ==
All music written by Sead Lipovača, except "Touch Me Little Girl" which written by Theo Werdin and M. Zai.

No.	Title	Lyrics	Length
1.	"Ciganka"	Slobodan Đurasović	3:02
2.	"Let Na Drugi Svijet"	Slobodan Đurasović	3:08
3.	"Divljakuša"	Alen Islamović	4:35
4.	"Dinamit"	Alen Islamović	3:40
5.	"Cmokni Mi Srce"	Alen Islamović	3:51
6.	"Hopa Cupa"	Alen Islamović	3:46
7.	"Vatra"	Alen Islamović	3:47
8.	"Touch Me Little Girl"	Theo Werdin	5:37
9.	"Moja Si"	Alen Islamović	3:11

== Personnel ==
- Sead Lipovača - lead guitar
- Alen Islamović - lead vocals,
- Zlatan Ćehić - bass,
- Nasko Budimlić - drums

=== Production ===
- Theo Werdin - producer
- Anun Marković - sound engineer
- Mladen Rodić - organizer
