= Islamović =

Islamović (Serbo-Croatian Cyrillic: Исламовић) is a surname. Notable people with the surname include:

- Alen Islamović (born 1957), Bosnian rock vocalist
- Dino Islamović (born 1994), Montenegrin footballer
