= Matija Ivanić =

Croatian rebel

Matija Ivanić (also Matij Ivanić; Vrbanj, Hvar around 1445 – Rome 1523), was a prominent 16th century citizen of the Dalmatian city of Hvar who led the Hvar Rebellion (1510–1514) against the Venetian Republic. After the defeat of the Rebellion, Ivanić became a symbol of freedom in Venetian-controlled Dalmatia, personifying defiance both against Venice and against the oppressive noble classes. He was mentioned in the well-known Dalmatian song which expresses these themes, the "Padaj silo i nepravdo" ("Fall, oh Force and Injustice!"). The latest discoveries present Mati Ivanić as a true visionary who stepped ahead of his time and led the fight for the future that was just beginning to emerge during the Middle Ages.

== See also ==
- Hvar Rebellion
- Hvar
- Padaj silo i nepravdo
