= Zlatan Stipišić Gibonni =

Croatian singer-songwriter and composer (born 1968)

Zlatan Stipišić-Gibonni
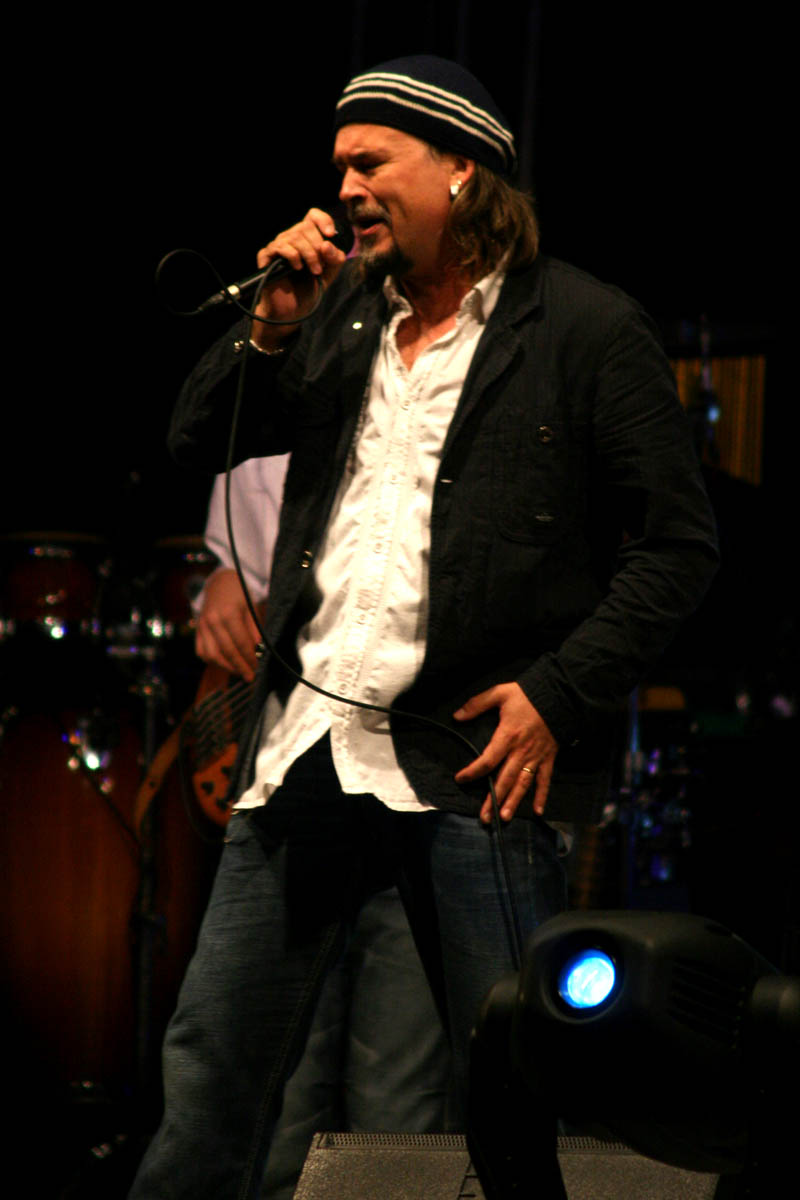
- Gibonni performing live in September 2007
- Born: Zlatan Stipišić; 13 August 1968 (age 58); Split, SR Croatia, Yugoslavia
- Other name: Gibonni
- Occupations: Singer; songwriter; musician
- Spouse: Sanja Stipišić
- Children: 3
- Musical career
- Genres: Rock; pop; heavy metal; disco; dance; pop-rock; folk-rock
- Instruments: Vocals; guitar
- Years active: 1986–present
- Label: Dallas Records
- Formerly of: Osmi putnik; Divlje jagode

Zlatan Stipišić (born 13 August 1968), also known as Gibonni, is a Croatian singer-songwriter and composer. He is one of the most successful and awarded recording artists from Croatia, receiving record-high 43 Porin music awards for his albums and songs.

Among his earliest solo works, "Činim pravu stvar" (“I'm doing the right thing”) and "Divji cvit" (“Wild flower”) are widely considered to be some of the most emotional Croatian-language songs of all time.

== Career ==
Born in a family with a strong musical tradition (his father, Ljubo, was a well-known composer and poet), Zlatan Stipišić who later embraced the nickname Gibonni, began his career in the 1980s with the heavy metal band Osmi putnik. After the group disbanded, Stipišić joined Divlje jagode, recording a few demo tapes before disbanding. It was Zele Lipovača, the lead guitarist of Jagode, who gave Stipišić the nickname Gibonni.

Gibonni started his solo career in the 1990s, with songs that combined elements of rock, modern pop and Dalmatian folk songs. He soon created a huge following, especially among Croatian youth. Gibonni's popularity continued to grow beyond Croatia and he is currently one of the most popular and influential musicians in the territories of the former Yugoslavia. Gibonni wrote the song "Cesarica" for Oliver Dragojević which became one of Oliver's signature hit songs and one of the most popular and well-known songs in Croatia.

In 2003, Stipišić was appointed a UNICEF Goodwill Ambassador. He is involved in many humanitarian concerts and organizations fighting hunger and poverty. Gibonni released his long-awaited and critically appraised album Unca fibre in May 2006, after a five-year period following his award-winning album Mirakul. For the sales of the album he was awarded with the diamond certification in Croatia and platinum certifications in Bosnia and Slovenia. In 2010, he released a new album Toleranca, and in 2013, he released 20th Century Man, sung entirely in English. This album was used partially as a fundraiser for SOS children's village. In 2016, Gibonni released the album Familija, which was made in collaboration with Oliver Dragojević, featuring 10 tracks. Soon afterwards, Gibonni released his Best of Collection consisting of his most popular songs, including some from his early 90s career.

== Discography ==
=== Albums ===
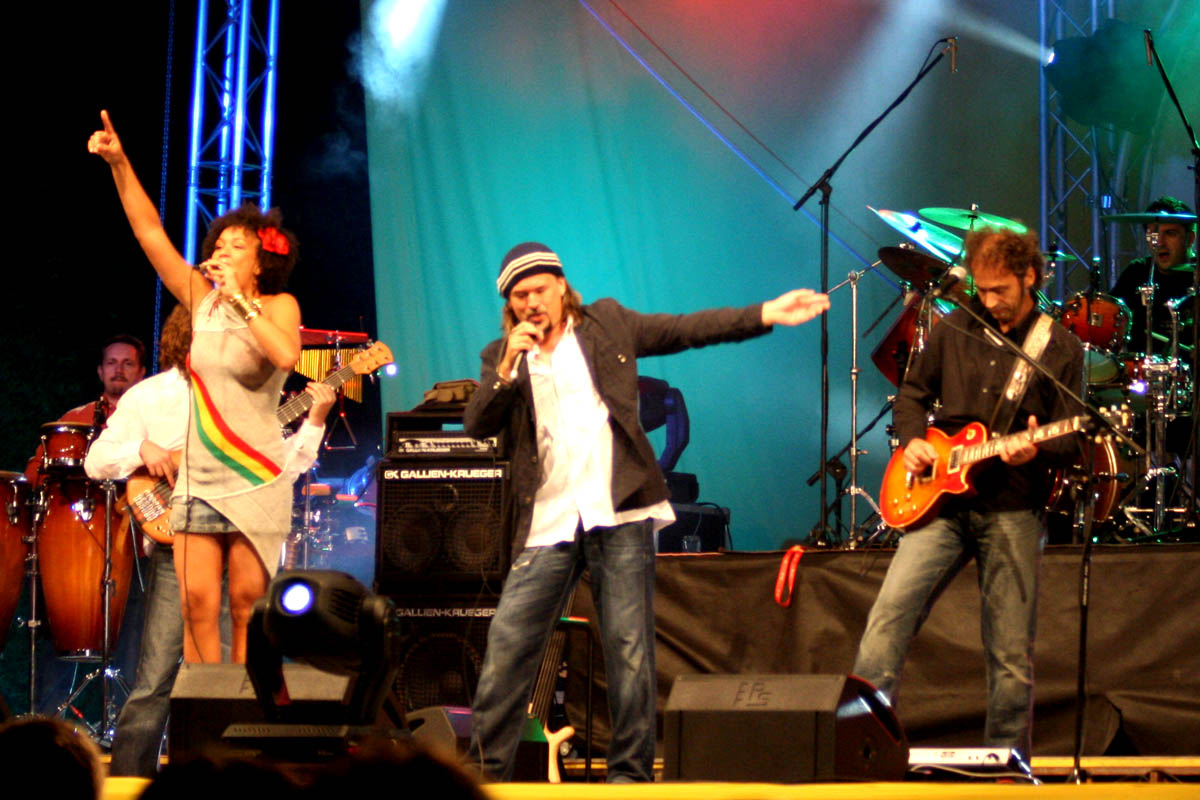
Gibonni performing live, September 2007

- 1991 Sa mnom ili bez mene, Croatia Records
- 1993 Noina arka, Croatia Records
- 1994 Kruna od perja, Croatia Records
- 1995 Koncert (live album), Croatia Records
- 1997 Ruža vjetrova, Croatia Records
- 1999 Judi, zviri i beštimje Dallas Records
- 1999 24 karata / 18 Velikih, Croatia Records
- 2000 HTisdn Millennium Koncert (DVD, live album), Dallas Records
- 2001 Mirakul, Dallas Records
- 2003 Svi moji punti kad se zbroje (box set), Dallas Records
- 2004 ZG Mirakul live (DVD, live album), Dallas Records
- 2006 Unca fibre, Dallas Records
- 2006 The platinum collection, Croatia Records
- 2007 Acoustic:Electric (live album), Dallas Records
- 2008 Acoustic:Electric special Christmas limited edition, Dallas Records
- 2010 Toleranca, Dallas Records
- 2013 20th Century Man, Dallas Records
- 2016 Familija, Aquarius Records
- 2016 Best of Collection, Croatia Records

=== Singles ===
Title	Year	Peak chart positions	Album
Title	Year	CRO	Album
"Kiša (Z'naab)"	2021	1	Non-album single

== See also ==
- Croatian music
- Zdenko Runjić
- Oliver Dragojević
- Zadarfest
- Dalmatia
