= Come On, Let It Be Heard, Come On, Let It Be Known =

Haj, nek se čuje, haj, nek se zna

Studio album by Alen Islamović
- Released: 1989
- Genre: Rock, Pop
- Label: Jugoton
- Producer: Nikša Bratoš

Haj, nek se čuje, haj, nek se zna (English: Come On, Let It Be Heard, Come On, Let It Be Known) is the first solo studio album by Bosnian rock star Alen Islamović, released in 1989.

== Track listing ==
1. Haj, nek se čuje, haj, nek se zna
2. Čin čin čini mi se
3. Prostakuša
4. Divlje godine
5. Moje sele
6. Trokiram (Ubiću se moje luče)
7. Ovo zrno duše
8. Ime
9. Kad bi mi tebe Bog oprostio
