= Vincenzo Cappello =

Former Venetian naval admiral

- Portrait of Cappello as a military commander, by Titian
- Born: 1469; Venice
- Died: 19 August 1541 (aged 71–72); Venice
- Burial place: Santa Maria Formosa
- Military career
- Allegiance: Republic of Venice (1512–1538)
- Branch: Venetian navy
- Rank: Provveditore all'Armata
- Conflicts: War of the League of Cambrai, Hvar rebellion, Third Ottoman–Venetian War: Battle of Preveza

Vincenzo Cappello (Venice, 1469 – 19 August 1541) was a Venetian nobleman and statesman, best known as the admiral of the Venetian navy in the Battle of Preveza.

== Biography ==
Vincenzo Cappello was born in Venice in 1469, to Nicolò Cappello. He is first noticed at Milan in October 1499, when he unsuccessfully tried to sell a "necklace of the King of the Romans ("collar fo dil re di romani") to King Louis XII of France. On 30 August 1502, and again on 28 March 1504, he was appointed to the post of state treasurer (camerlengo de Comùn).

=== Captain of the Flanders convoy ===
In June 1504, he was given charge of the great trade galley convoy (muda) to Flanders and London, one of the most lucrative commercial routes of the time.

After months of preparations, the convoy sailed in February 1505. The journey proved successful, so that by July 1506, the Venetian ships were so laden with merchandise for the return journey that 300 balls of wool had to be left behind.

On 27 July 1506 Cappello was received by King Henry VII of England, who awarded him trading privileges, knighted him, and gave him the right to include the Tudor rose in his own arms. As representative of the Republic of Venice, Cappello also received the King's messages of goodwill and alliance to the Republic. On the return journey, Cappello's good fortune was again apparent: attacked by Genoese warship that thought he was a pirate, and brought to Cagliari, he not only managed to have his identity confirmed there, but also gathered new merchandise to the value of 6,000 ducats.

On his return to Venice on 28 November 1506, his ships, laden with goods, made a great impression and secured him considerable wealth, which Cappello employed in pursuing a political career.

=== Political and military career ===
In April 1509, Cappello disclosed that he had loaned 10,000 ducats to the Republic. Although this was denied, it helped his popularity, and his election to the Venetian Senate was quick. While enjoying considerable popularity, he nevertheless also had detractors who accused him of intending to dominate the state.

==== First fleet commands ====
Boosted by his popularity, he was elected to the senior office of superintendent of the Venetian navy (Provveditore all'Armata) on 14 January 1512. In this position, he displayed great skills and knowledge of naval matters, as well as political maturity. The navy was in poor shape at the time, lacking organization, men, and even hardtack for the ships. Although he tried to remedy the situation, this shortage led to some bitter experiences: in July 1514, at Corfu, lack of hardtack forced him to cease pursuit of a fleet of twenty Ottoman fustas, while in December 1515 he was forced to disband his fleet at Istria, as the officers and crews demanded their delayed pay. As a result, in his customary report (relazione) to the Venetian government, he severely criticized the navy's organization. In the meantime, he briefly participated in the defence of Padua in February 1514 (during the War of the League of Cambrai), before going to suppress, with considerable harshness, the Hvar rebellion.

==== Governor of Famagusta ====
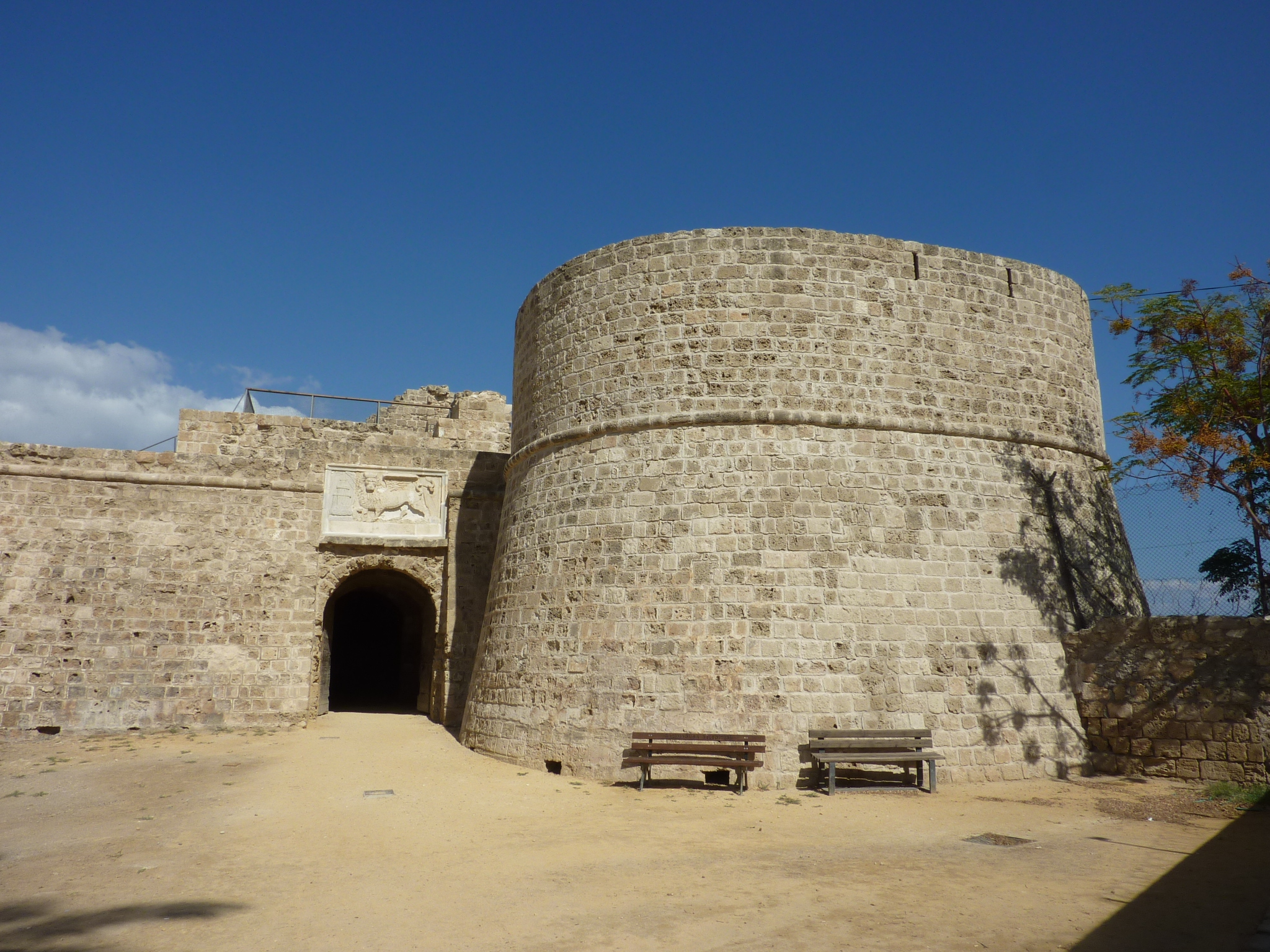
Gate of the medieval "Othello Castle" of Famagusta

In December 1515 he was appointed as fortress commander (capitano) at Famagusta on Cyprus, after a gift of 2,000 ducats to the Republic. Cappello found the fortifications of Famagusta utterly insufficient to face an Ottoman attack, and denounced the behaviour of the Venetian officials on the island as "scandalous". Being firmly convinced of the "bad faith" of the Ottomans, he devoted himself to strengthening the defences of the city, which he achieved with only a modest additional monthly spending of 400 ducats. His successor, Bartolomeo Contarini, who replaced him in March 1519, expressly praised his work.

==== Rise to high political offices ====
Leaving Famagusta on 10 March 1519, on 29 July he was back in Venice, resuming his career in the Republic's government. He refused a nomination as superintendent of fleet provisions and equipment (Provveditore all'Armar) on 16 August, but instead became a member of the Council of Ten on 16 October. On 19 June 1520, he became ducal councillor (consigliere ducale) for the sestiere of Santa Croce, and lieutenant-governor (luogotenente) of Friuli on 9 September 1520. From this position he carefully observed Ottoman military moves in Dalmatia. He returned to Venice on 7 June 1522. He was elected as an orator to the new Pope, Adrian VI, in August, he did not go to Rome because of the outbreak of the plague there, and himself contracted an illness that forced him to stay at Ferrara. He became consigliere of the sestiere of Cannaregio on 26 May 1523, and refused an appointment as Duke of Candia on 27 September. In October, he participated in an inquest into the activities of the Ten and "against the sects and the suborners of the public offices". Again elected orator to the newly elected Pope Clement VII on 26 November, he declined due to renewed poor health.

On 3 May 1524 he was member of the board of the Savi a Tansar, followed by election as superintendent on sales (Provveditore sopra le Vendite) on 9 December. On 1 February 1525, he was elected one of the three consiglieri da basso who represented the Doge at the criminal appeals court, the Council of Forty (Quarantia Criminale), and on 30 September 1526 one of the forty elected to the zonta. On 1 September 1527 he again became a member of the Ten, and on 3 October 1527 one of the reviewers of the accounts of the Ten (revedadori di le Casse).

==== Renewed fleet commands, Preveza, and death ====
On 5 March 1529, he was appointed one of the seven Savi di Terraferma, on 1 August, as consigliere "beyond the Canal", and finally, on 12 September, again as Provveditore all'Armata. Conscious of the fleet's problems, Cappello made specific demands to accept the position, requiring the government to furnish sufficient men, hardtack, and funds. His quarrels with the Senate delayed his departure and left a legacy of tense relations, which survived despite his re-appointment to the post on 11 June 1532.

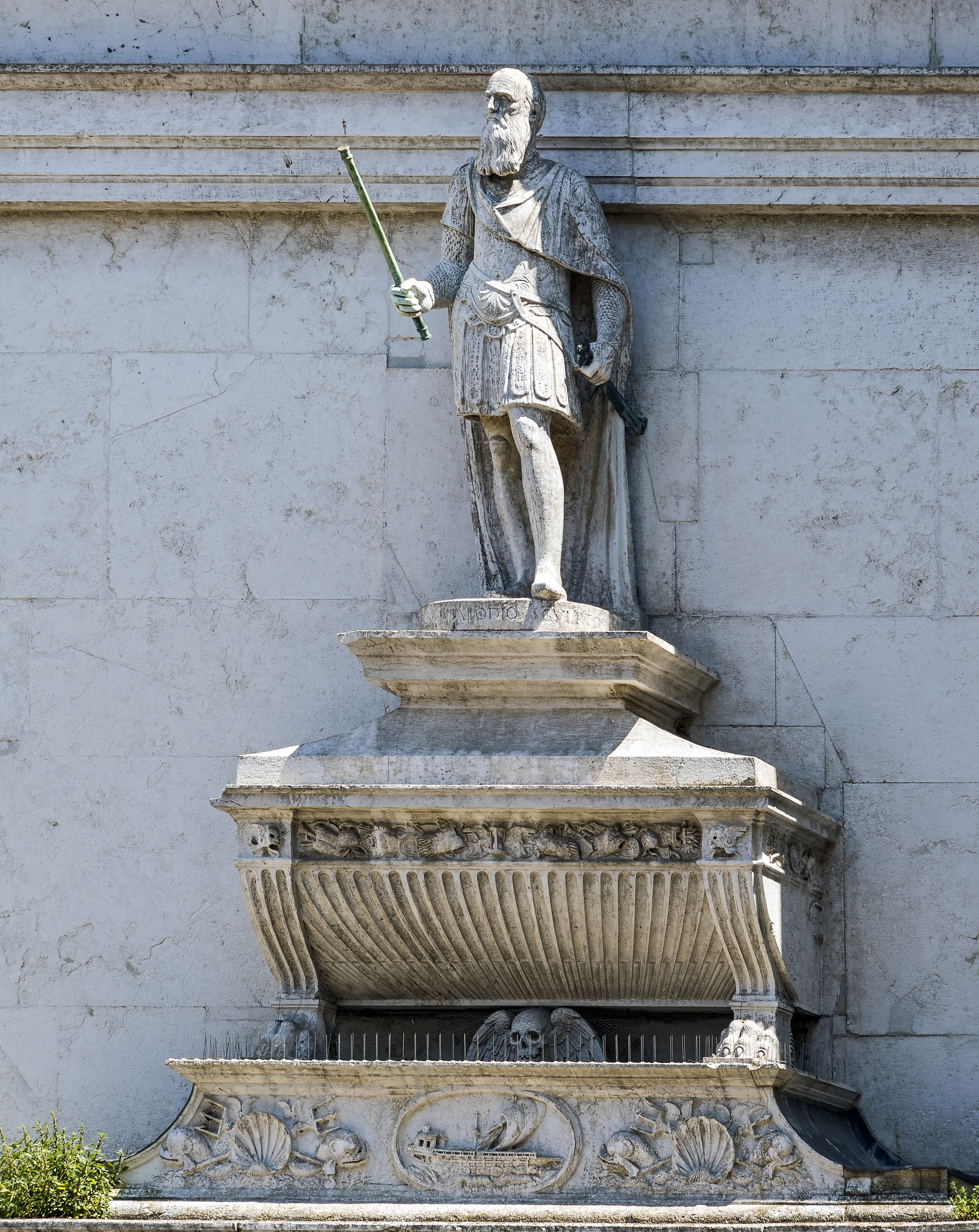
Monument to Vincenzo Cappello at his burial church of Santa Maria Formosa

Tasked with "restoring order to the fleet", but without provoking either the Turks or the Holy Roman Emperor, Cappello found his assignment fraught with worries. Reappointed to his post in 1534, in his reports to the Senate, he elaborated on the lack of hardtack, the desertion of his men to the Emperor's better-paying forces, the inadequacy of the fortifications in the Republic's overseas possessions (especially Zara, Sebenico, and Corfu), and the inefficiency of the naval construction system. As the historian Achille Olivieri points out, however, Cappello was no reformer: his outlook remained grounded in practical, everyday reality eschewing great risks and ideals in favour of a Venetian state secure in its strength, immobile, and almost "removed from the disruptive dialectic of the historical process".

In 1535, he was elected ducal councillor for the sestiere of Castello. Following the outbreak of the Third Ottoman–Venetian Wari in 1537, he was elected as Provveditore all'Armata. The fleet of Venice and its allies (chief among them Habsburg Spain) captured the fortress of Castelnuovo, leaving behind a Spanish garrison, but was defeated by the Ottoman navy at the Battle of Preveza in September 1538. Blamed by the Spanish for the defeat and taken ill, he returned to Venice, where he became a member of the Savi Grandi. In January 1539 he participated in the election of Pietro Lando as Doge, and was elected as Procurator of St. Mark de supra.

He died on 19 August 1541, and was buried at the church of Santa Maria Formosa, whose façade is decorated with his statue.

== Sources ==
- Olivieri, Achille (1975). "CAPPELLO, Vincenzo". Dizionario Biografico degli Italiani (in Italian). Vol. 18: Canella–Cappello. Rome: Istituto dell'Enciclopedia Italiana. ISBN 978-88-12-00032-6.
