= Čarobnjaci =

Studio album by Divlje Jagode
- Released: 2 November 1983
- Recorded: September–October 1983 in Music Park Studio, Bad Homburg vor der Höhe, Germany
- Genre: Hard rock, heavy metal
- Label: Diskoton
- Producer: Theo Werdin, Ulli Werdin

Divlje Jagode chronology
Motori (1982)	Čarobnjaci (1983)	Vatra (1985)

Čarobnjaci (English: Wizards) is the fourth studio album by the Yugoslav and Bosnian heavy metal band Divlje Jagode. The album was recorded in Bad Homburg vor der Höhe, Germany and was released November 1983.

== Track listing ==
No.	Title	Lyrics	Length
1.	"Nazovi me"	Sead Lipovača	3:27
2.	"Morison (uvod)"	instrumental	1:00
3.	"Morison"	Alen Islamović	2:17
4.	"Đavolji grad"	A. Islamović	3:19
5.	"Čarobnjaci"	S. Lipovača	4:10
6.	"Svi nisu kao ja"	A. Islamović	4:30
7.	"Pepeljuga"	Husein Dervišević	4:08
8.	"Sama si"	A. Islamović	4:26
9.	"Metalni radnici"	S. Lipovača	5:10
10.	"Samo tren"	A. Islamović	4:27

== Personnel ==
- Sead Lipovača - Co-producer, Music By, Arranged By
- Alen Islamović - lead vocals, bass
- Nasko Budimlić - drums

=== Production ===
- Theo Werdin - producer
- Ulli Werdin - assistant producer
