= Hvar rebellion =

Rebellion on Hvar between 1510–1514

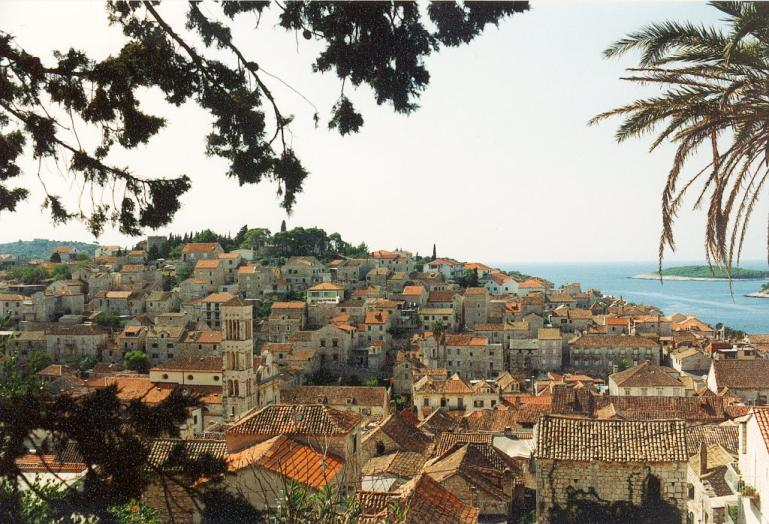
- The city of Hvar, on the island bearing the same name.
Date	1510–1514
Location	The Dalmatian island of Hvar, esp. its largest city, also called Hvar.
Result	Rebellion failed, Venetian victory.

Belligerents
Republic of Venice	Hvar rebels

Commanders and leaders
(Republic of Venice) Giovanni Navagero (Republic of Venice) Sebastiano Giustiniani (Republic of Venice) Vincenzo Capello	Matija Ivanić

The Hvar rebellion (Croatian: Hvarska buna) (1510–1514) was a popular uprising of the people and citizens of the Dalmatian island of Hvar on the Adriatic Sea against the island's nobility and their Venetian masters. It began on the island's largest city, also called Hvar, but spread to the entire island.

== Background ==
The Venetian Republic ruled Dalmatia and its majority Croatian population since 1420 and appointed a Venetian noble (called Count) to head the city communes, thus removing the most important autonomous right of the local population. The local noble councils of the cities, however, still held authority in governing most local matters.

As early as the 15th century, the citizens of the city of Hvar formed the so-called citizen's councils and demanded some government offices as well as authority in the government. The blunt refusal of these repeated demands was the first cause that sparked the rebellion. The second was the appalling behavior of noblemen towards the citizen's women, which included rape. Their husbands and fathers were unable to prevent or punish the offenders. Another cause was the rise of wealthy citizens' families that desired greater influence.

In order to secure their power, local nobles instituted a law which prohibited the election into the ruling council of anyone whose father or grandfather was not its member. This legalized oligarchy proclaimed itself a god's institution, and passed criminal laws that greatly discriminated the ordinary citizens. The nobility went by the medieval principle of intimidation, by which ordinary people were more likely to commit crimes, and that evil people, who were going to commit them anyway, could only be intimidated into obedience. This made it seem as though all ordinary citizens were potentially evil, and should be treated with that in mind. The legal discrimination was another deciding factor in the Rebellion.

== Rebellion ==
The immediate cause for the uprising was the inhumane behavior of several of the nobles, which included rape of the citizens' women. An all-out revolt quickly gripped the island, led by Matija Ivanić, a prominent citizen of Hvar. With a contingent of armed citizens, Ivanić broke into the city and attacked the nobles. He executed some and burnt their houses, while incarcerating others. He demanded of the Hvar Prince equality in taxation and criminal law.

Having gathered 2,000 armed men and 30 galleys for patrolling the coast and preventing the escape of the nobles to Venice, he took control of the island. In the second year he issued a demand to the Venetian Republic, asking for permission to hold a council of all classes in Hvar to create a more just government. The letter held 20 seals and signatures with 60 more prominent citizens voicing their support. At the same time, the citizens accused the nobles of injustices and demanded their punishment.

At the beginning of the conflict, the Venetians kept an appearance of neutrality, probably due to their war against the League of Cambrai. They invited both sides to Venice; failing that, and due to the rebellion's significant impact on the whole of Dalmatia, the Venetians decided to energetically pursue its conclusion. Giovanni Navagero (Zuane Navaiero in Venetian) was consequently sent to Hvar, where he succeeded in pacifying the uprising in 1511 by unknown means, while the rebels still held control over the island and did not allow the nobles to return.

However, by the end of the same year, there was unrest again against the Venetians in the whole of Dalmatia, which threatened to spread. Therefore, Venice sent Sebastiano Giustiniani, from the Giustiniani family, to Hvar in 1512, and he tried to quell the uprising by brute force. He terrorized the citizens under his control, sentenced 69 to exile, and offered a bounty of 400 ducats on Matija Ivanić's head. He was thwarted, though, by a decisive defeat of his troops at the hands of Ivanić's forces near Jelsa, another town on the island. Sebastiano Giustiniani (Sebastian Justiniano in Venetian) was recalled, but the Venetians dispatched 15 war galleys under the command of Vincenzo Capello to end the rebellion.

Upon his arrival, Capello managed to destroy all armed galleys of the rebels by October 1514, overcoming their land forces only after a prolonged struggle. Subsequently, he hanged 19 leaders of the rebellion on his flagship, and cut off one hand and eye of 10 others.

The Hvar Rebellion was destroyed, while Matija Ivanić managed to escape the island and leave Venetian lands. He tried to return to Hvar several times without success, and later moved to Italy to the town of Vieste, where he is mentioned in sources for the last time around 1519. The struggle for the citizens' equality was continued by non-violent means by his son, Ivan Ivanić, and his offspring.

== See also ==
- Croatian-Slovenian peasant revolt
- History of Dalmatia
- Padaj silo i nepravdo
