= Stakleni hotel =

Studio album by Divlje Jagode
- Released: 1981
- Recorded: February 1981 in Belgrade
- Genre: Hard rock, heavy metal
- Label: Diskoton
- Producer: Enco Lesić, Zele Lipovača

Divlje Jagode chronology
Divlje jagode (1979)	Stakleni hotel (1981)	Motori (1982)

Stakleni hotel (English: Glass Hotel) is the second studio album by the Yugoslav and Bosnian heavy metal band Divlje Jagode. The album was recorded in Belgrade in February 1981 and was released later that same year.

== Track listing ==
No.	Title	Lyrics	Length
1.	"Autostop"	Goran Petranović
2.	"Mrak za dvoje"	Alen Islamović
3.	"Kako si topla i mila"	G. Petranović
4.	"Stakleni hotel"	Šefket Nakić
5.	"Ulica na lošem glasu"	G. Petranović
6.	"Dodirni me, skloni bol"	Marina Tucaković
7.	"Za one do tebe, nemam više ni banke"	A. Islamović
8.	"Potraži put"	A. Islamović, Zele Lipovača

== Personnel ==
- Ante (Toni) Janković - lead vocals
- Zele Lipovača - guitar
- Alen Islamović - bass
- Nasko Budimlić - drums

=== Production ===
- Enco Lesić, Zele Lipovača - producers
