= Padaj silo i nepravdo =

Song

"Padaj silo i nepravdo" (lit. '"fall, (oh) force and injustice"') is a Croatian revolutionary song inspired by the Hvar Rebellion. It is based on "Slobodarka", a 1908 song written by Josip Smodlaka. The song first appeared on the island of Hvar in 1922.

During World War II, the song was popular among Yugoslav Partisans, particularly those from Dalmatia.

The song gained prominence after being featured in the film Battle of Neretva. It was also featured in Pljuni i zapjevaj moja Jugoslavijo, a 1986 studio album by Bijelo Dugme, a prominent Yugoslav rock band.

== Lyrics ==
Croatian

Padaj silo i nepravdo,
Narod ti je sudit zvan.
Bjež'te od nas noćne tmine,
Svanuo je i naš dan.

Pravo naše ugrabljeno,
Amo natrag dajte nam!
Ne date li ne molimo,
Uzet će ga narod sam.

Gradove smo vam podigli,
Turne, kule gradili.
Oduvijek smo roblje bili,
I za vas smo radili.

Nevolja će biti vela,
Po palači tvrdimi,
Kad vidite da sa sela,
s mašklinima gremo mi.

Nastati će novo doba,
Matija Ivaniću!
Ustati ćeš tad iz groba,
S tobom u boj poći ću!

Zastava će nova viti,
Iznad naših glava tad.
Radnik seljak jedno biti,
Isti im je trud i rad!

English translation

Fall oh force and injustice,
The people are called to bring judgement on you.
Flee from us, shadows of the night,
Our day has come at last.

Our stolen right,
restore it back to us!
Should you refuse, we're not begging,
The people will take it themselves.

Cities we have erected for you,
Towers, keeps we have built.
Ever slaves have we been,
Toiling for you.

The anguish shall be great,
In the palaces strong,
When you see us coming from the country,
coming with pickaxes.

A new age shall come to be,
Oh Matija Ivanić!
From the grave you will rise,
And with you into battle I shall go!

A new flag shall wave,
High above our heads that day.
Worker and peasant shall be one,
Their work and labor is same!

There are other versions in which the name "Matija Ivanić" is replaced with "Vladimir Ilyich", the first name and patronymic of Vladimir Ilyich Lenin ("Matija Ivaniću!" replaced with "Vladimire Iljiču!").

== See also ==
- Yugoslav People's Liberation War
- List of socialist songs
