= Motori =

Studio album by Divlje Jagode
- Released: September 1982
- Recorded: 3–23 June 1982 at Music Park Studio, Bad Homburg vor der Höhe, West Germany
- Genres: Hard rock, heavy metal
- Length: 33:49
- Label: Diskoton
- Producers: Theo Werdin, Ulli Werdin

Divlje Jagode chronology
Stakleni hotel (1981)	Motori (1982)	Čarobnjaci (1983)

Motori (English: Motorcycles) is the third studio album by the Yugoslav and Bosnian heavy metal band Divlje Jagode. The album was recorded at Music Park Studio in Bad Homburg vor der Höhe, West Germany and was released in September 1982. It is considered the band's breakthrough album and it sold around 500,000 copies. The song "Ne želiš kraj" was written by former vocalist Ante "Toni" Janković, who previously left the group due to musical differences and was replaced by Alen Islamović. Janković joined the band on stage during the tour in support of the album.

== Track listing ==
All music written by Sead Lipovača. All lyrics written by Alen Islamović, except where noted.

No.	Title	Lyrics	Length
1.	"Motori"		4:30
2.	"Šampioni"		2:58
3.	"Nasmješi se"		5:01
4.	"Zagrizi Rock 'n' Roll"		4:03
5.	"Sve iz inata"		2:49
6.	"Šejla"		3:47
7.	"Dodirni me"		3:22
8.	"Ne želiš kraj"	Toni Janković	3:11
9.	"Divlji zapad"		4:08

== Charts ==
Chart performance for Motori
Chart (2025)	Peak position
Croatian Domestic Albums (HDU)	1

== Personnel ==
- Sead Lipovača - lead guitar
- Alen Islamović - lead vocals, bass
- Nasko Budimlić - drums

=== Production ===
- Theo Werdin - producer
- Ulli Werdin - assistant producer
- Mišo Rodić - executive producer
- Erol Čolaković - photography, artwork

== See also ==
- List of number-one albums of 2025 (Croatia)
