= Od neba do neba =

Studio album by Divlje jagode
- Released: 2003
- Genre: Heavy metal
- Label: Croatia Records

Divlje jagode chronology
Sto vjekova (1996)	Od neba do neba (2003)	Biodinamička ljubav (2013)

Od neba do neba (English: From Heaven to Heaven) is the ninth studio album by the Bosnian heavy metal band Divlje jagode, released in 2003.

== Track listing ==
No.	Title	Length
1.	"Dobro došla ljubavi"
2.	"Motori 2003"
3.	"Marija"
4.	"Piši mi"
5.	"Od neba do neba"
6.	"Ne krivi me"
7.	"Kap po kap"
8.	"Ljubi me i ostani"
9.	"Oluja"
10.	"TV kralj"
11.	"Ne želiš kraj"

== Personnel ==
- Pero Galić – lead vocals
- Sead Lipovača – guitar
- Dejan Orešković – bass
- Thomas Balaž – drums
