= Mramor, kamen i željezo =

Live album by Bijelo Dugme
- Released: 1987
- Recorded: 1987
- Genres: Rock; hard rock; folk rock; pop rock
- Label: Diskoton / Kamarad
- Producers: Goran Bregović; Zoran Redžić

Bijelo Dugme chronology
Pljuni i zapjevaj moja Jugoslavijo (1986)	Mramor, kamen i željezo (1987)	Ćiribiribela (1988)

Mramor, kamen i željezo (transl. "Marble, Stone and Iron") is the third live album by Yugoslav rock band Bijelo Dugme, released in 1987. Originally released as a double album, the material was recorded throughout 1987 during the band's tour in support of their Pljuni i zapjevaj moja Jugoslavijo album.

Mramor, kamen i željezo was the band's last release to feature keyboardist Vlado Pravdić.

== Background ==
The album was recorded during 1987, on the promotional tour for the band's 1986 album Pljuni i zapjevaj moja Jugoslavijo (Spit and Sing, My Yugoslavia). The album offered a retrospective of the band's work, featuring songs spanning from their early singles to their latest album. The title track did not previously appear on any of the band's studio albums. It is a cover of a hit by the Yugoslav beat band Roboti.

The album featured similar Yugoslavist iconography as the bands' previous two releases, Bijelo Dugme and Pljuni i zapjevaj moja Jugoslavijo: the track "A milicija trenira strogoću" ("And Militsiya Trains Strictness") begins with the melody of "The Internationale", during the intro to "Svi marš na ples" ("Everybody Dance Now") the singer Alen Islamović shouts "Bratsvo! Jedinstvo!" ("Brotherhood! Unity!"), and the album cover features a photograph from the 5th Congress of the Communist Party of Yugoslavia.

Mramor, kamen i željezo was the band's last album to feature keyboardist Vlado Pravdić. He left the band after the album release, dedicating himself to computer business. However, he continued to occasionally perform with the band, on larger concerts, and was, until the end of the band's activity, still considered an official member.

== Track listing ==
All tracks are written by Goran Bregović, except where noted.

No.	Title	Lyrics	Music	Length
1.	"Mramor, kamen i željezo" ("Marble, Stone and Iron")	Toni Studeny	Drafi Deutscher	2:14
2.	"A milicija trenira strogoću" ("And Militia Trains Strictness")	Duško Trifunović	Goran Bregović	4:25
3.	"Svi marš na ples" ("Everybody, off to Dance")			3:58
4.	"Na zadnjem sjedištu moga auta" ("In the Back Seat of my Car")			3:17
5.	"Top" ("Cannon")			3:36
6.	"Sve će to, o, mila moja, prekriti ruzmarin, snjegovi i šaš" ("All of that, My Dear, Will be Covered by Rosemary, Snow and Reed")			8:19
7.	"Ako možeš zaboravi" ("Forget, if You Can")			6:40
8.	"Selma"	Vlado Dijak	Goran Bregović	2:21
9.	"Tako ti je, mala moja, kad ljubi Bosanac" ("That's How it is, Baby, When You Kiss a Bosnian")			3:05
10.	"Ne spavaj, mala moja, muzika dok svira" ("Don't You Sleep, Baby, While the Music is Playing")			3:12
11.	"Meni se ne spava" ("I Don't Feel Like Sleeping")			5:09
12.	"Odlazim" ("I'm Leaving")			5:23
13.	"Lipe cvatu, sve je isto k'o i lani" ("Linded Trees are in Bloom, Everything is just How it Used to Be")			3:26
14.	"Pristao sam biću sve što hoće" ("I Accepted, I'll Be Anything They Want")	Duško Trifunović	Goran Bregović	3:15
15.	"Lažeš" ("You're Lying")			4:48
16.	"Sanjao sam noćas da te nemam" ("Last Night, I Dreamed that I Didn't Have You")			6:27

== Reception ==
Despite the fact that the concerts on the tour were praised, the album was disliked by most of the Yugoslav music press. Most of the critics considered Mramor, kamen i željezo the worst of the band's three live albums released up to that point. The band's leader, Goran Bregović stated about the album: "My intention wasn't to make a live album. I just wanted to record some of Bijelo Dugme's [new] arrangements [of old songs]."

== Personnel ==
- Alen Islamović - vocals
- Goran Bregović - guitar, producer
- Zoran Redžić - bass guitar, producer
- Ipe Ivandić - drums
- Vlado Pravdić - keyboard
- Laza Ristovski - keyboard

=== Additional personnel ===
- Amila Sulejmanović - backing vocals
- Lidija - backing vocals
- Zumreta Midžić - backing vocals
- Božidar Lukić - engineer
- Braco Radović - engineer
- Rajko Bartula - engineer (studio)
- Goranka Matić - photography
- Ivo Pukanić - photography
- Kemal Hadžić - photography
