= Osmi Putnik =

Croatian heavy metal band

- Origin: Split, Croatia
- Genres: Hard rock; heavy metal; glam metal
- Years active: 1985–1989; 2002–present
- Labels: Jugoton, PGP-RTB, Dancing Bear, PGP-RTS, One Records, Croatia Records
- Members: Bojan Antolić; Danijel Stojan; Giuliano Đanić; Ivan Dabro; Tomislav Mandarić
- Past members: Zlatan Stipišić; Nenad Mitrović; Davor Gradinski; Igor Makić; Dražen Krolo; Miro Marunica; Alen Koljanin; Mirjan Jovanović; Dean Brkić; Marsel Benzon; Petar Šantić; Kristian Barišić
- Website: www.osmiputnik.net

Osmi Putnik (transl. The Eighth Passenger, the Yugoslav title of the film Alien) is a Croatian and Yugoslav hard rock band formed in Split in 1985.

Initially led by vocalist Zlatan Stipišić "Džibo", Osmi Putnik achieved nationwide popularity with their debut studio album Ulična molitva, released in 1986. The band's following two studio releases maintained their status of one of the most popular bands on the Yugoslav hard rock and heavy metal scene. However, the band split up in 1989, only several months after the release of their third album, as Stipišić moved to Divlje Jagode. In 2002, the band's former members Bojan "Božo" Antolić (guitar), Davor Gradinski (bass guitar) and Mirjan Jovanović (guitar) reformed Osmi Putnik with the approval of the band's former leader Stipišić, who in the meantime started a successful career as a singer-songwriter under the stage name Gibonni. With new vocalist, Dean "Clea" Brkić, the band recorded the successful comeback album Živ i ponosan, released in 2005. Brkić left the band after their fifth studio album, the band, led by Antolić, continuing their activity with vocalist Giuliano Đanić.

== History ==
=== 1985–1989 ===
The band was officially formed on 7 May 1985 in Split, by Zlatan Stipišić "Džibo" (vocals), Nenad Mitrović (guitar), Davor Gradinski (bass guitar), Igor Makić (guitar), and Dražen Krolo (drums). They chose their name after the Yugoslav title of Ridley Scott's 1979 film Alien. The band had their first performance as the opening band for Zabranjeno Pušenje on 1 August 1985 in Split's Arena Gripe. A month later, they won the first place at Dalmatia Youth Rock Meetings festival. At the end of the year, they won the first place at the Radiotelevision Zagreb show Stereovizija (Stereovision) with the song "Lutko moja, takav sam ti ja" ("My Doll, That's What I'm Like").

At the beginning of 1986, after several line-up changes, a stable line-up was formed, featuring Stipišić (vocals), Mitrović (guitar), Gradinski (bass guitar), Bojan "Božo" Antolić (guitar) and Miro Marunica (drums). During the year, they released their debut album Ulična molitva (Street Prayer) through Jugoton record label. All the songs on the album were written by Stipišić. The glam metal-oriented album achieved success and launched Osmi Putnik to the top of the Yugoslav hard rock and heavy metal scene. A year later, Mitrović was replaced by guitarist Alen Koljanin.

The band released their second album Glasno, glasnije (Loud, Louder) in 1987 through PGP-RTB label. The album was produced by Mirko Krističević, former bass guitarist of the band Metak from Split, and the album featured a cover of Metak song "Da mi je biti morski pas" ("If I Was a Shark"). The title track featured players of the football club Hajduk Split Stjepan Andrijašević, Ive Jerolimov, Mladen Pralija and Zoran Vulić on backing vocals. The album repeated the success of its predecessor, the title track going on to become the band's biggest hit, and for a period of time an unofficial anthem of Hajduk Split fans Torcida. After the album release, the band was joined by the new drummer, Mirjan Jovanović. At the end of the year, the readers of the Yugoslav music magazine Rock polled Osmi Putnik the Band of the Year and Glasno, glasnije the second on the list of Albums of the Year.

In 1988, the band released their third studio album, Drage sestre moje... Nije isto bubanj i harmonika (My Dear Sisters... Drums and Accordion Are Not the Same Thing). Although generally disliked by the Yugoslav music critics, the album was well received by the fans. However, only several months after the album release, Stipišić joined Divlje Jagode and Osmi Putnik disbanded.

=== Post breakup ===
After a year spent with Divlje Jagode, Stipišić left the band, and was for a short time the vocalist for the German band V2. After he left V2, he started a successful solo career under the stage name Gibonni. Koljanin moved to Australia, where, in 2009, he became a member of the Canberra-based band Knights of the Spatchcock.

=== 2002–present ===
At the beginning of 2002, Bojan Antolić, Davor Gradinski and Mirjan Jovanović, with the approval from the band's former leader Stipišić, who maintained a successful solo career, reformed Osmi Putnik. The new lineup featured, beside Antolić on guitar, Gradinski on bass guitar and Jovanović on guitar, vocalist Dean "Clea" Brkić (a former Pandora member) and drummer Kristijan Barišić. The band released their comeback album Živ i ponosan (Alive and Proud) in 2005. The album was produced by Brkić, and featured, beside new songs, new versions of the band's old songs "Glasno, glasnije" and "Srce od kamena" ("Heart of Stone"). On 11 June 2006, the group performed as the opening act on Motörhead concert in Zagreb. During the same year, PGP-RTB successor PGP-RTS reissued Glasno, glasnije and Drage sestre moje... Nije isto bubanj i harmonika on single CD.

In 2010, the band released their fourth studio album, entitled Tajna (Secret). The album was recorded with the new drummer, Danijel Stojan. Tajna featured, beside new tracks, a cover of Zdravko Čolić's hit "Glavo ludo" ("Crazy Head"). Tajna featured guest appearances by former Divlje Jagode member Žak Tataj (vocals), Mary Rose member Eki Alilovski (guitar) and Alogia members Srđan Branković (guitar), Miroslav Branković (guitar) and Nikola Mijić (vocals).

In 2021, after a longer hiatus in their work, the band recorded the album Rock 'n' Roll se kući vratio (Rock 'n' Roll Came Back Home), entitled after a song from their third album, featuring new vocalist, Giuliano Đanić, previously a member of the bands Apokalipsa (Apocalypse), and Feeling and a successful solo artist. The album featured new versions of the band's old songs, with "Nada" ("Hope") being the only new songs. The new version of "Tajna" featured pop singer Doris Dragović as guest vocalist.

== Legacy ==
In 2011, the song "Glasno, glasnije" was polled, by the listeners of Radio 202, one of 60 greatest songs released by PGP-RTB/PGP-RTS.

== Discography ==
=== Studio albums ===
- Ulična molitva (1986)
- Glasno, glasnije (1987)
- Drage sestre moje... Nije isto bubanj i harmonika (1988)
- Živ i ponosan (2005)
- Tajna (2010)
- Rock 'n' Roll se kući vratio (2021)
