= Žanil Tataj - Žak =

Žanil Tataj – Žak
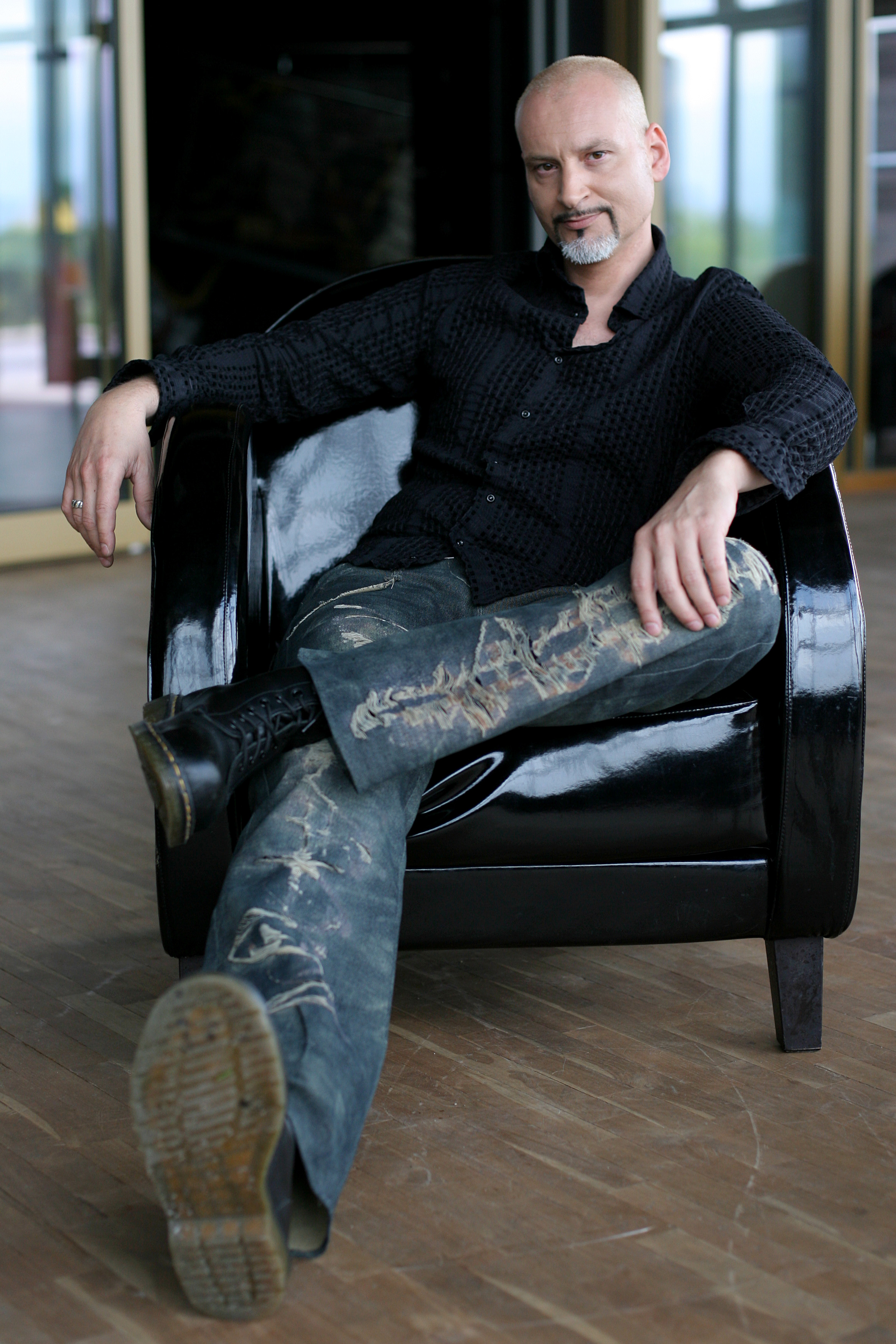

Background information
- Also known as: Žak
- Born: Žanil Tataj; 2 May 1967 (age 59); Rijeka, Croatia
- Genres: Heavy metal, hard rock, rock, pop, classical music
- Occupations: Musician, Singer, Songwriter, Producer, Mentor at YMS Rijeka
- Instruments: Vocals, Guitar, Bass Guitar, Violin, Viola, Keyboards
- Member of: Ravenstine, Alen Šenkovski Band
- Formerly of: Divlje Jagode(Wild Strawberries), Jersey, Black Diamond, Mary Rose

Žanil Tataj – Žak (born 2 May 1967), is a Croatian musician, singer, composer and producer.

== Early life ==
Žak was born in Rijeka, Croatia. He graduated from Music high school in Rijeka, finishing the course of violin and viola. In addition to that he is also a multi-instrumentalist. Žak has learned vocal technics from his mother Petja Todorova – Tataj, famous piano player and vocal educationalist.

== Career ==
Žak has started his rich music career in mid 80's in famous Rijeka's band Jersey. They've recorded their first album, Pustite Da Živim, for Yugoslav discography label Jugoton. They had numerous concerts all around Yugoslavia, and have received many different awards from various rock festivals. Between 1988 and 1991 he played a viola in opera orchestre of HNK Ivan Zajc.

In the beginning of the 1990s Jersey had stopped performing, because Žak was, known for his great vocal abilities, invited to perform with legendary rock band Divlje Jagode (Wild Strawberries). They've recorded album Magic Love, which was, because of intention of being published on the European market, sung in English. Because of the war in Yugoslavia, Divlje Jagode stopped performing and therefore Žak has started working with the Slovenian band Mary Rose. They've recorded album called Pleasure & Pain, but because of the fire blast in studio Tivoli, the album never saw the light of the day. Mary Rose then stopped performing for some years. In the beginning of 1994, Žak has contributed on the joint project of the famous European rock bands Helloween and Gamma Ray. He also worked with Zoran Šerbedžija, ex-guitarist of Crvena Jabuka on the project "Madcap Laf" in Germany.

In 1995 and 1996 he worked as an instrumentalist and vocalist on two albums of Slovenian band Turbo, called The Power Of Metal and A Glimpse Of Home. In the second half of 1995 he founded a band in Croatia called Aqua, with whom he recorded a self-titled album. He returned to Divlje Jagode with the concert Final top 1000 in Stuttgart. This concert was broadcast by SDR 3, MTV and other European TV and radio stations. With Divlje Jagode he recorded an album Sto Vjekova and successfully performed all over Europe until 1999. In 1999 he recorded his first solo album and with few songs performed on festivals like Neumski and Splitski. At the end of 1999 he published his symphonic album, titled Božićne Pjesme(Christmas Songs).

In the beginning of 2000 he started performing with two Slovenian cover bands, Črna Gradnja and Ambasada. Due to the urge for making original authors music, he and guitarist Eki Alilovski refounded Mary Rose in 2004. As the result of this work, they have released a new album titled Feniks, in 2006.

In 2006, he also founded a jazzy band Norne with famous Rijeka's vocalist, where Žak is playing a bass guitar. This band performs various songs in various languages and is getting ready for concerts and possible album.

From 2008 to 2019, Žak was a music teacher and coach in Studio Maraton music school.

In 2013 he joined Slovenian heavy metal band Black Diamond, after the release of their first album Last Man Standing, on which he sang most of the songs.

From 2013 to 2014, Žak was a part of a project by HGU and Rijeka philharmonic orchestra, called Riječka Filharmonija i Riječki Rokeri (Rijeka's Philharmonics and Rijekas' rockers). Singers Žanil Tataj - Žak, Damir Prodanović - Prlja (Let 3), Damir Urban and Dean Škaljac performed on two concerts with philharmonics in venue Hartera, Rijeka.

In 2018, Žak collaborated with Divlje Jagode again. He appeard on a bands' 40th anniversary album called Jukebox, which was released in 2020.

In 2019 Žak founded a new band which performs under his name Žanil Tataj – Žak. They released an album Da Capo.This album was the first part of what was to become a solo album trilogy. Album was released by the ONE RECORDS label from Belgrade, Serbia. A year prior, same label has also released an album Pustite da živim, which was recorded in 1988 by Žak's first band Jersey.

2019 is also a year when Mary Rose, after years of health difficulties of some of their members, finally released new album Resničen Svet. Album was released on May 17, followed by a promotional concert in Postojna, Slovenia. This concert is hoped and expected to be an announcement of come back of one of Slovenia's legendary bands.

In 2019, he also started being a vocal and bass guitar coach at Yamaha music school in Rijeka.

In 2020, Žak appeared as a guest on Canadian bands' Srčani Udar album "Sve ili ništa". He appears on songs Kad te pukne pjesma and Priča života mog. In 2020 and following into 2021 he continues collaborating with various artists and bends, such as God’s Army, Blindspot, Ivan Pop, Zoran Šerbedžija, Miloš Aranđelović (Kramer), Alen Šenkovski, Ravenstine, Evolucija and many others.

In 2022 Žak released a second part of his solo album trilogy, called Al Fine. The album was released by ONE RECORDS label, from Belgrade, Serbia.

In 2023, Žak appeared on the album Ravenstein, by the German super-group Ravenstein. Also in 2023, Žak was a guest of the Croatian band LET 3. They won on the Croatian Eurovision song contest Dora, and later same year performed on the Eurovision song contest in Liverpool.

In 2024, after the Ravensteins' release of an album 2024, he performed on a German promotional tour with the band. On this tour, the band recorded a live album, which was released in 2025.

In late december 2024, Žak released the third part of his solo album trilogy, called CODA.

In 2026, Žak joined forces with a guitarist, composer and producer Ivan Pop, to record an album of 13 completely rearranged songs from the trilogy albums.

== Discography ==
=== Albums ===
- Jersey – Pustite Da Živim, (1988)
- Zele/Divlje Jagode – Magic Love (1993)
- Aqua – Aqua (1995)
- Turbo – The Power Of Metal (1995)
- Turbo – A Glimpse Of Home (1997)
- Divlje Jagode – Sto Vjekova (1997)
- Žanil Tataj - Žak – Božićne Pjesme (1999)
- Žanil Tataj - Žak – Divojčica Naranćica (2001)
- Mary Rose – Feniks (2006)
- Žika – Filozofija (2008)
- Black Diamond – Last Man Standing (2013)
- Jersey – Pustite Da Živim (re-release) (2018)
- Mary Rose – Resničen svet (2019)
- Žanil Tataj - Žak – Da Capo (EP) (2019)
- Žanil Tataj - Žak – Al Fine (2022)
- Ravenstine – Ravenstine (2023)
- Ravenstine – 2024 (2024)
- Žanil Tataj - Žak – Coda (2024)
- Ravenstine – Live (2025)

=== Compilations ===
- Dobro Jutro Opatija (1996)
- Ajmo Rijeka (1997)
- Najljepše Božićne Pjesme – Čežnja Vijekova (1998)
- Split '99 (1999)
- Divlje Jagode – Antologija 1 (2000)
- Divlje Jagode – Antologija 2 (2000)
- Etnofest Neum 2000 (2000)
- Korčula 2000 – Festival Pjesme I Vina (2000)
- Divlje Jagode – The Very Best Of – Let Na Drugi Svijet (2014)
- Najljepše Božićne Pjesme (2006)
- Divlje Jagode – Collection Boxset (2006)
- Divlje Jagode – Greatest Hits (2015)
- Divlje Jagode – Original Album Collection vol.1 (2018)
- Divlje Jagode – Original Album Collection vol.2 (2018)

=== Singles ===
- Boje Jutra (1995)
- Gabrijel (1996)
- Kao More (2000)
- Divojčica Narančica (2001)
- Ništa Nije Zauvijek (2001)
- Ništa Nije Zauvijek (2001)
- Mary Rose - Sam (2006)
- Black Diamond - The Edge Of Sanity (2015)
- Black Diamond - Struggle With Shadows (2015)
- Mary Rose - Stampedo (2016)
- Black Diamond - Above The Sky (2016)
- Black Diamond - Bad Colour (2017)
- Mary Rose - Resničen Svet (2019)
- Mary Rose - Vizija (2019)
- Tišina (2019)
- Na Putu Za Raj (2019)
- Ispočetka (2019)
- Da li ti je dosta? (2021)
- Have you Had Enough? (2021) *As Jake Tate
- Blindspot – Life Inflicts (2021)
- Alen Šenkovski – Muzej Izgubljenih Duša (2021)
- Mary Rose - Kje Si Zdaj (2022)
- Alen Šenkovski feat.Enio Vučeta – Za Sve Je Kriv Rock 'n' Roll (2022)
- Na Jastuku (2022)
- Buđenje (2022)
- Novi Svijet (2022)
- Hologram (2022)
- Grom U Koprive (2023)
- Pustite Da Živim (2023)
- Ravenstine – Ravenstine (2023)
- Ravenstine – Freedom Day (2023)
- Možda Danas (2023)
- Duga Zima (2023)
- Ravenstine – Black Is The Brightest Color (2023)
- Kišni Dan (2023)
- Blindspot – Shallow Grave (2023)
- Alen Šenkovski ft. Dragianni – Zagrli Me U Beznađu (2023)
- Mary Rose - Nagon (2024)
- Ravenstine – A Long Way Home (2024)
- Ravenstine – Fly Eagle Fly (2024)
- Alen Šenkovski – Obzorja Gore (2024)
- Kako Ljubav Boli (2024)
- Ništa Labavo (2025)
- Vrijedilo Je (2025)
- Zaustaviti Vrijeme (2025)
- At The End Of Time (2026)
- Vraćam Se (2026)
- Pratit Ćemo led (2026)

=== Collaborations ===
- Let 3 – Bombardiranje Srbije I Čačka (2005)
- Ženska Klapa Luka – Dani (2007)
- Divine Illusion – Genetic (2010)
- Divlje Jagode – Biodinamička ljubav (2013)
- Zoran Šerbedžija & Žanil Tataj - Žak – Ti Si R'N'R (2020)
- Divlje Jagode – Sama Si (album Jukebox) (2020)
- Srčani Udar (album Sve Ili Ništa) – Kad Te Pukne Pjesma (2020)
- Srčani Udar (album Sve Ili Ništa) – Priča Života Mog (2020)
- Ivan Pop feat. Žanil Tataj - Žak – Open your Eyes (2021)
- God’s Army (album Warriors Of The Wasteland) – Kindred Spirits (2021)
- Analiza Uma feat. Žanil Tataj - Žak & Zoran Mišić – Kraj (version 1) (2021)
- Analiza Uma feat. Žanil Tataj - Žak – Kraj (version 2) (2021)
- Srčani Udar feat. Žanil Tataj - Žak – Halo Svemir (2022)
- Maciej Podsiadło feat. Žanil Tataj - Žak – Metal Warrior (2022)
- Evolucija – The Earth Is Full Of Rats (ft. Žanil Tataj - Žak) (2023)
- Vrane Vrane – Sedam Slavnih (2023)
- Evolucija – Shame On You (feat. Žanil Tataj - Žak) (2024)
- Evolucija – Ne Zaslužuješ Stih (feat. Žanil Tataj - Žak) (2025)
- Ivi Duzel – Siroče (feat. Žanil Tataj - Žak & Roko Duzel) (2025)
- Ivo Kvesta ft. Žanil Tataj - Žak – Vjerujem u sebe (2025)
- Ivo Kvesta ft. Žanil Tataj - Žak – Here I Go (2026)

=== Music and Executive producer ===
- DNA – Naša Priča (2012)
- Sara – Ljetna (2013)
- Sara – Zauvijek (2015)
- Sara – Laku noć (2016)
- Silvija Starčević – Plan (2016)
- Silvija Starčević – Dobro Jutro (2016)
- Silvija Starčević – Hologram (2017)
- Carlo Božić – Tajna (2019)
- Lucija Gajzler – Reflection (2020)
- Tea Vučak – Sve Je Lako (2020)
