= Divlje Jagode =

Croatian and Yugoslavian band

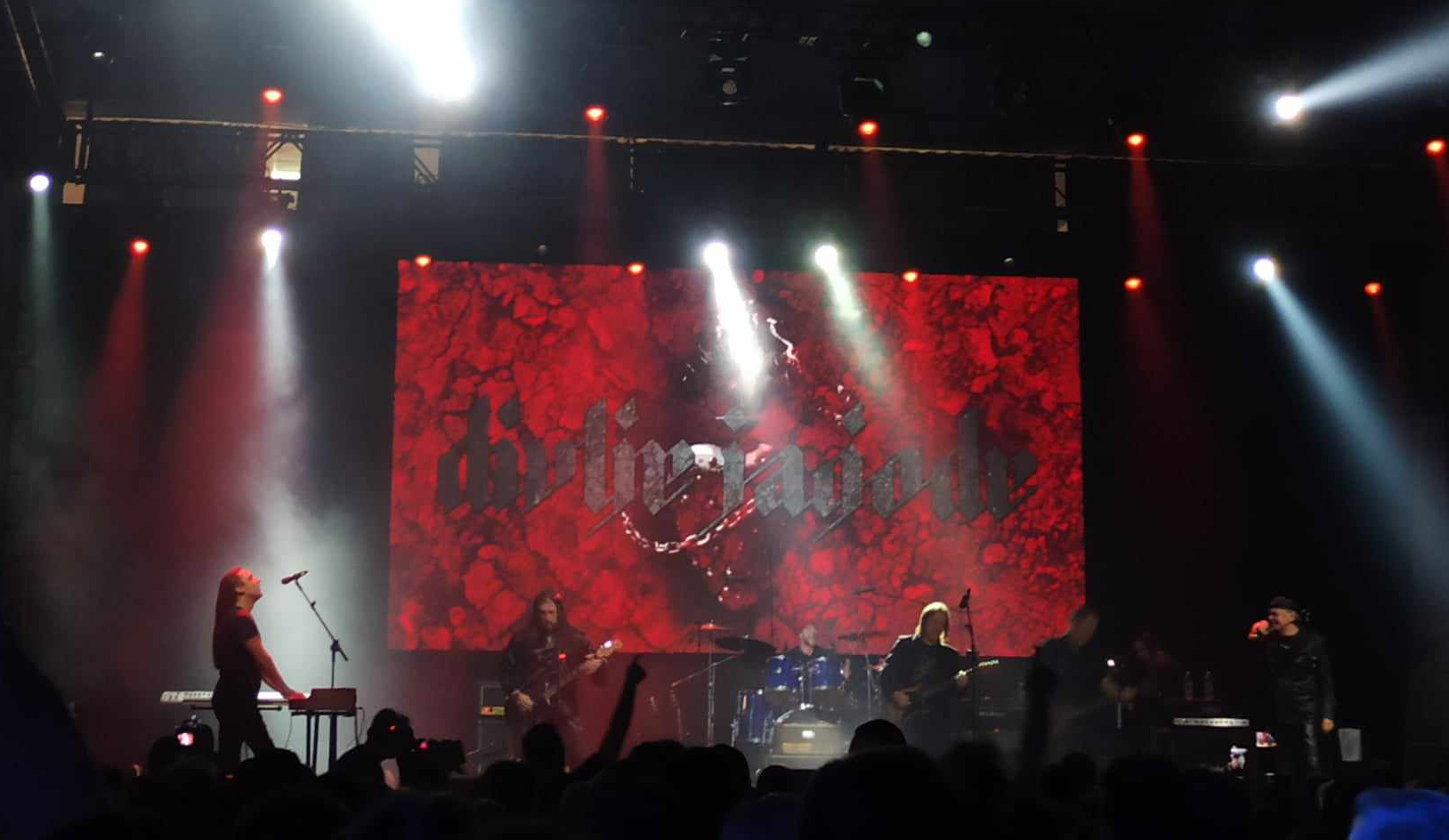
- Divlje Jagode performing in Belgrade in 2022

Background information
- Also known as: Wild Strawberries
- Origin: Sarajevo, Bosnia and Hercegovina, SFR Yugoslavia (1977–1985, 1987–1990); London, England (1986); Zagreb, Croatia (1994–present)
- Genres: Hard rock; heavy metal; glam metal
- Years active: 1977–1990; 1994–present
- Labels: Jugoton, Diskoton, Logo Records, Nimfa Sound, Croatia Records, One Records
- Members: Sead Lipovača; Anto "Toni" Janković; Livio Berak; Emil Kranjčić; Damjan Deurić; András Ispán
- Past members: Nihad Jusufhodžić; Mustafa Ismailovski; Adonis Dokuzović; Alen Islamović; Nasko Budimlić; Samir Šestan; Zlatan Ćehić; Mladen Vojičić; Edin Šehović; Vladimir Podany; Dragan Jankelić; Zlatan Stipišić; Žanil Tataj; Sanin Karić; Dejan Orešković; Pero Galić; Tomas Balaž; Marko Osmanović; Adrian Borić; Damjan Mileković; Nikola Milat; Saša Cavrić; Mladen Krajnik; Velibor Čolović; Igor Matković
- Website: www.divlje-jagode.com

Divlje Jagode (lit. 'Wild Strawberries') is a hard rock and heavy metal band, originally formed in 1977 in Sarajevo, SR Bosnia and Herzegovina, SFR Yugoslavia, and since their 1994 reunion based in Zagreb, Croatia. Led by guitarist Sead "Zele" Lipovača, Divlje Jagode are widely considered to be one of the most popular hard rock and heavy metal bands in the region of former Yugoslavia. Since their founding, the band have released 13 studio albums, a live album and a number of compilation albums, scoring a number of hit songs and selling around 4 million records.

The band was formed at the end of 1976/beginning of 1977 by Sead Lipovača (guitar), Anto "Toni" Janković (vocals), Nihad Jusufhodžić (bass guitar), Adonis Dokuzović (drums) and Mustafa "Muc" Ismailovski (keyboards). Throughout Divlje Jagode's career, Lipovača would remain the leader and the only mainstay member of the group. The band gained the attention of the Yugoslav public and the media with their 1978 debut self-titled album and the 1981 album Stakleni hotel. After the release of their second album, Janković left the band, parting ways with the rest of the group amicably, and would be seen on several occasions in the following years as guest musician on the band's concerts and albums. With bass guitarist Alen Islamović taking over the vocal duties and the albums Motori (1982), Čarobnjaci (1983) and Vatra (1985), the band achieved large mainstream popularity in Yugoslavia, which provided them with a contract with a British record label and an opportunity to record an album for the international market. In 1986, the group moved to London, England, where they started working on their international career under the name Wild Strawberries, adopting a more glam metal image and recording an English language album. However, doubting the success of the band's venture in England, Islamović accepted the invitation from Goran Bregović, the leader of the most popular Yugoslav band Bijelo Dugme, to join his group as the replacement for the vocalist Mladen Vojičić "Tifa", and the album Wild Strawberries was released internationally without much promotion. After a hiatus, Lipovača reformed the group in Yugoslavia with Bijelo Dugme's former frontman Vojičić as the vocalist, recording the 1988 album Konji. In 1989, the band was joined by former Osmi Putnik vocalist Zlatan Stipišić "Džibo". Despite making demo recording, the lineup featuring Stipišić never made any official releases, and Divlje Jagode disbanded in 1990.

In 1994, Lipovača reformed the group, long-time bass guitarist Zlatan Čehić taking over the vocals. The band's following releases, Labude, kad rata ne bude (1994) and Sto vjekova (1996), the latter recorded with vocalist Žanil "Žak" Tataj, presented the band with a slightly softer, more ballad-oriented sound. With the 2003 album Od neba do neba, recorded with vocalist Pero Galić, the band reestablished their popularity in the region of former Yugoslavia. Since 2013, the band has performed with vocalist Livio Berak, Divlje Jagode original vocalist Anto Janković becoming an official member once more and the second vocalist for the band with the release of the 2020 studio album Jukebox.

== Biography ==
=== Formation and initial success (1977–1979) ===
The band's beginnings can be tracked to the mid-1970s and the Zagreb-based band Zenit (Zenith), featuring guitarist Sead "Zele" Lipovača. Lipovača was born in Bihać and, after graduating from high school, moved to Zagreb for his studies of external trade. In Zagreb he performed with the bands Biseri (The Pearls) and Selekcija (Selection), before joining Zenit. Zenit reached the peak of their career with their performance at the 1974 edition of the BOOM Festival, held in Tivoli Hall in Ljubljana, with the live version of their song "Stara kuća je prazna" ("The Old House Is Empty") appearing on the live album Boom Pop Festival Ljubljana '74, recorded at the event. In 1977, Zenit former members Lipovača, vocalist Anto "Toni" Janković and bass guitarist Nihad Jusufhodžić formed the band Divlje Jagode in Sarajevo. The first lineup of the group also featured keyboardist Mustafa "Muc" Ismailovski (formerly of the band Grešnici) and drummer Adonis Dokuzović (formerly of Novi Akordi and Renesansa). The group soon managed to sign a contract with Yugoslavia's biggest record label Jugoton. The members initially wanted to name the band Dobro Ime (A Good Name), but the idea was ridiculed by Jugoton editors. Eventually, the members chose the name Divlje Jagode (Wild Strawberries), after the 1957 film by Ingmar Bergman.

The band achieved large popularity with their first singles – hard rock ballads "Jedina moja" ("My Only One") and "Patkica" ("Duckling"), and a cover of Bosnian traditional song "Moj dilbere" ("My Sweetheart"). In 1978, Divlje Jagode released their debut self-titled album. The album featured Led Zeppelin-, Deep Purple- and Black Sabbath-influenced hard rock sound, with "Želim da te imam" ("I Want to Have You"), the balad "Krivo je more" ("The Sea Is to Blame"), and a new version of "Jedina moja" receiving large airplay. After the album was released, the band went on hiatus, as part of the members had to serve their mandatory stints in the Yugoslav People's Army. Ismailovski moved to pop rock band Srebrna Krila, and Lipovača, together with lyricist Marina Tucaković, became the spiritus movens for the disco group Mirzino Jato.

=== Continued success (1980–1981) ===
The band continued their activity in 1980, in the new lineup featuring Lipovača, Janković and two new members, bass guitarist Alen Islamović, formerly of the band BAG, and drummer Nasir "Nasko" Budimlić, formerly of the band Problemi sa Miljacke (Problems from Miljacka). Unsatisfied by their previous record label's promotion of their first album, Lipovača made a decision to move to Sarajevo-based record label Diskoton, which would release all the band's albums before their breakup in 1990. In the Belgrade studio Druga maca (Another Kitty), owned by producer Enco Lesić, the band recorded their second studio album entitled Stakleni hotel (Glass Hotel), which marked their complete shift towards heavy metal. The album was co-produced by Lipovača and Lesić. The songs were composed by Lipovača, and the lyrics were written by Islamović, Marina Tucaković, Goran Petranović (vocalist for the band Elvis J. Kurtović & His Meteors) and Šefket Nakić. The album brought several hit songs – hippie-inspired "Autostop" ("Hitchhiking") and the ballads "Dodirni me, skloni bol" ("Touch Me, Remove the Pain") and "Potraži put" ("Look for the Road").

On the tour that followed the album release, Lipovača appeared in schoolboy stage outfit inspired by the stage outfit of AC/DC guitarist Angus Young. During 1981, the band played around one hundred concerts, including the September 1981 performance on the festival at the Belgrade Hippodrome, headlined by the most popular Yugoslav band Bijelo Dugme and British heavy metal band Iron Maiden, for which this was the first performance in the region. Divlje Jagode also had a successful appearance at the 1981 Belgrade Rock Festival and on the fund-raising concerts for the victims of an earthquake in Bosanska Krajina.

=== Islamović as vocalist and nationwide popularity (1982–1986) ===
In 1982, Janković parted with the rest of the band amicably, starting a career as a solo artist, releasing his first solo album Za tvoju ljubav (For Your Love) in 1984. Alen Islamović, in addition to playing bass guitar, took over the vocal duties. The band's third studio album and the first with Islamović on vocals was recorded in Music Park Studios in Bad Homburg vor der Höhe, Germany, and produced by Theo Werdin. The songs were composed by Lipovača, and the lyrics were written by Islamović. The album, entitled Motori (Motorcycles), was released in 1982, the title track becoming a nationwide hit. Other well-received songs included "Šejla", "Zagrizi rokenrol" ("Bite On Rock 'n' Roll") and the ballads "Nasmiješi se" ("Smile") and "Ne želiš kraj" ("You Don't Want the End"), the latter featuring lyrics written by Janković before he left the band. On a part of the follow up tour, Janković made guest appearances on the band's concerts. Following Motori and the subsequent tour, Divlje Jagode was considered as one of the most popular bands in the country.

The band's fourth album, entitled Čarobnjaci (Wizards), was also recorded in Germany and produced by Werdin, and released in 1983. Although it did not repeat the commercial success of the previous album, Čarobnjaci brought the minor hit "Metalni radnici" ("Metal Workers"). With the arrival of bass guitarist Zlatan Čehić, formerly of the band Top (Cannon), Islamović quit playing bass guitar and concentrated on vocal duties only. During the album's supporting tour, Islamović received an invitation from Bijelo Dugme leader Goran Bregović to join his band as the replacement for the vocalist Željko Bebek. Fearing that recently departured Bebek might decide to return to Bijelo Dugme, Islamović turned the offer down.

In 1985, the band released their fifth studio album, entitled Vatra (Fire). Recording and mixing were done in studios of RTV Sarajevo and Music Park Studios in Bad Homburg vor der Höhe. The album was once again produced by Theo Werdin, who also wrote the song "Touch Me Little Girl", the only English language song on the album. The songs were composed by Lipovača, and the lyrics were written by Islamović and Slobodan Đurašović. The album brought the hits "Ciganka" ("Gypsy Girl") and "Let na drugi svijet" ("Flight to Another World"). For the promotional tour, the band was joined by keyboardist Samir Šestan "Droga", a member of the band Rezervni Točak (Spare Wheel) from Doboj.

=== Attempt at international breakthrough (1986) ===
Soon after they finished Vatra promotional tour, owing to the album Čarobnjaci the band signed a five-year contract with British record company Logo Records, based in London. Prior to the contract signing, Divlje Jagode held a large concert in Zagreb. In attendance, alongside people from Logo Records, was journalist Xavier Russel of the British magazine Kerrang!. In his review of the concert he compared Divlje Jagode's sound to the sound of Black Sabbath, Y&T and Saxon, with occasional addition of Judas Priest-influenced riffs, and noted that Divlje Jagode's ballads were the best received songs on the concert. Following the contract signing, the group moved to London, where they changed their name to Wild Strawberries, adopting a more glam metal image, and started working on their first album for the international market. The album was recorded in Matrix studio in London and produced by Keith Woolvin. The band re-recorded eight of their old songs with new, English language lyrics written by Yugoslav singer-songwriter Aleksander Mežek, alongside two new songs, "Wild Boys" and "Fire on the Water". The keyboards on the album recording were played by British musician Don Airey, who was previously a member of Colosseum II, Rainbow and Ozzy Osbourne's backing band. According to Yugoslav press from that period, Lipovača was at the time offered to join the British hard rock band Whitesnake; he stated in a 2020 interview that it was Don Airey who suggested this to Whitesnake management. Believing in the international success of his own band, Lipovača did not proceed with the offer and decided focus on his current band's career. In February 1986, Wild Strawberries released the single "Shayla" to announce their upcoming album, and performed in a number of English clubs, including a concert in London's Marquee Club, held on 19 February.

The band's attempt to make a breakthrough on the British marked was abruptly ended. Alen Islamović, who was at the time spending ten hours a day practicing his English, was unsure of prospects of their success in Great Britain and believed that Divlje Jagode are neglecting the Yugoslav market. He decided to accept the second invitation from Goran Bregović and join Bijelo Dugme as a replacement for the vocalist Mladen Vojičić "Tifa". Islamović's departure delayed the release of Wild Strawberries album and put an end to the band's efforts of breaking into international market. Following Islamović's departure, Budimlić also left, soon after retiring from rock scene and starting to perform in kafanas with the folk group Jarani (Friends). The album, entitled Wild Strawberries, was eventually released in Britain in May 1987, almost a year and a half since its recording, and subsequently in Germany, Italy, Sweden and the Netherlands. As the lineup which recorded the album had already disbanded by the time of its release, Wild Strawberries was not followed by promotional performances or much promotion from the record label.

=== Back in Yugoslavia, disbandment (1987–1990) ===
During the hiatus following the departure of Islamović, the band released the compilation album Najbolje (The Best). At the beginning of 1987, Lipovača, supported by Zlatan Čehić, decided to put together another lineup. Initially, Lipovača negotiated with Stevie, vocalist and leader of the Glasgow band Zero Zero, but eventually, in the summer of 1987, Divlje Jagode's new vocalist became Mladen Vojičić "Tifa", the former Bijelo Dugme singer whom Islamović had replaced. The lineup was complete with the arrival of drummer Edin Šehović, who had previously performed abroad in the bands Country Carma, Bandoleros, and Tusk, and keyboardist Vladimir Podany, a graduate from the Sarajevo Music Academy and a former member of Armija B (Army B). This lineup started recording their next album, produced by Peter Hinton, known for his collaboration with the British heavy metal band Saxon. The album, entitled Konji (Horses), was released at the beginning of 1988. It brought several well-received songs, including the title track, ballad "Zauvijek tvoj" ("Forever Yours"), written by Vojičić, and a new version of the song "Divlje jagode", originally released on the band's first album, the new version featuring a musical quotation from the sevdalinka "Lijepi li su Mostarski dućani" ("Mostar's Shops Are Beautiful"). The album also featured the band's version of Wolfgang Amadeus Mozart's Turkish March.

This lineup did not last long either; in the middle of 1988 tour, Vojičić, Podany and Šehović left the band. For the rest of the tour, Čehić took over the vocals, and the drums were played by former Bijelo Dugme member Dragan "Điđi" Jankelić. During the 1989 tour, they were joined by their original vocalist Anto Janković, who performed mostly songs from his period in the band. By the end of the year the former Osmi Putnik frontman Zlatan Stipišić "Džibo" became the band's new vocalist. This lineup recorded demos, owing to which Lipovača signed a five-year contract deal in the United States. However, the project was never realized, Stipišić moving to the German band V2, soon after starting a successful solo career, and Divlje Jagode disbanded.

=== Post breakup (1990–1993) ===
Following the outbreak of Yugoslav Wars in 1991, Lipovača lived in Germany, London and Zagreb. During this period he recorded his first solo album Magic Love with former Divlje Jagode members Zlatan Čehić and Nasko Budimlić, while on vocals was former Jersey member Žanil "Žak" Tataj. The album featured English language lyrics, written by Tataj and former Divlje Jagode member Zlatan Stipišić, and was produced by Nikša Bratoš, who also recorded keyboard sections, and provided backing vocals. The song "Can't Stop" featured Tina Rupčić on vocals, while the song "She Is Gone" featured former Kongres member Emir Cenić on vocals. During war years, Lipovača was also involved in many humanitarian concerts in Zagreb.

=== Reunion and new releases (1994–2002) ===
Lipovača reformed Divlje Jagode with Ćehić and Budimlić, Čehić taking over the vocals. The band went to Germany, where they played several humanitarian concerts. In Germany, the band recorded their eight studio album, entitled Labude, kad rata ne bude (Swan, When There's No More War), presenting themselves with a softer sound than on their previous releases. The song "Na tvojim usnama" featured the band's original singer Anto Janković on lead vocals. The album was followed by concerts across Germany and Croatia and in other European countries. In mid-1995, Čehić left the group.

The band continued their career in the new lineup, consisting of Lipovača, Budimlić, Žanil Tataj (vocals) and Sanin Karić (bass guitar, formerly a member of Teška Industrija and a touring member of Bijelo Dugme). The new lineup performed in 1995 on the Finale Top 1000 festival at Stuttgart Hippodrome and recorded the band's ninth studio album Sto vjekova (Hundred Centuries). The album songs were composed by Lipovača, and the songs lyrics were written by himself, Anto Janković, Dino Merlin and Zlatan Stipišić. Sto vjekova was recorded in Stuttgart, Germany, co-produced by Lipovača and Denis Mujadžić "Denyken" and released by German record label Nimfa Sound in 1996. The album featured guest appearances by Emir Cenić (vocals) and Toni Lasan (keyboards). After the album release, Karić left the band and was replaced by Dejan Orešković, formerly of the band Hard Time. Drummer Tomas Balaž was hired as a temporary replacement for Budimlić on several occasions. After series of concerts across Croatia, Bosnia and Herzegovina and Slovenia, the band went on a break. By the end of 1999, after a series of concerts across Europe, Žanil Tataj left the band.

=== Return to the regional scene (2003–present) ===
After Tataj's deperture, Divlje Jagode regrouped in the new lineup. It consisted of Lipovača, drummer Nasko Budimlić, bass guitarist Dejan Oreškovič, and vocalist Pero Galić, who had previously performed as the frontman of the Croatian hard rock band Opća Opasnost. The new lineup recorded the album Od neba do neba (From Sky to Sky), released in 2003 through Croatia Records. The album was recorded and mixed during three years period, in several different recording studios across the region and Europe. The album included a new version of "Motori", entitled "Motori 2003", the song "Kap po kap" ("Drop by Drop"), written by Lipovača and originally recorded by Mladen Vojičić "Tifa" in 1995 under the title "Duge kiše јеsenje" ("Long Autumn Rains"), a live version of the band's old ballad "Ne želiš kraj", and a cover of Uriah Heep song "Lady in Black" entitled "Marija". The song "Ne krivi me" ("Don't Blame Me") featured guest appearance by Anto Janković, and other guest appearances on the album included vocalists Tina Rupčić and Mirta Mandić, and the band's old collaborator Samir Šestan. For the promotional tour, Budimlić was replaced by previously hired drummer Tomas Balaž (formerly of Anestesia and Majke). The recording of the band's concert held on 27 April 2004 in Zagreb's Dom Sportova was, alongside music videos, released on the DVD Divlje Jagode by Serbian record label One Records. In 2004, Croatia Records released the double compilation album The Very Best Of, which included a new version of the hit ballad "Krivo je more". In 2005, prior to the band's United States tour, Pero Galić left the band, and was replaced by their original vocalist Ante Janković, who became a permanent member of the band for the first time since 1982. During the tour, they played a concert in Chicago together with Croatian and Yugoslav rock band Parni Valjak. The United States tour was followed by a tour across Australia, for which the band was joined by their former bass guitarist Sanin Karić, and concerts in Switzerland.

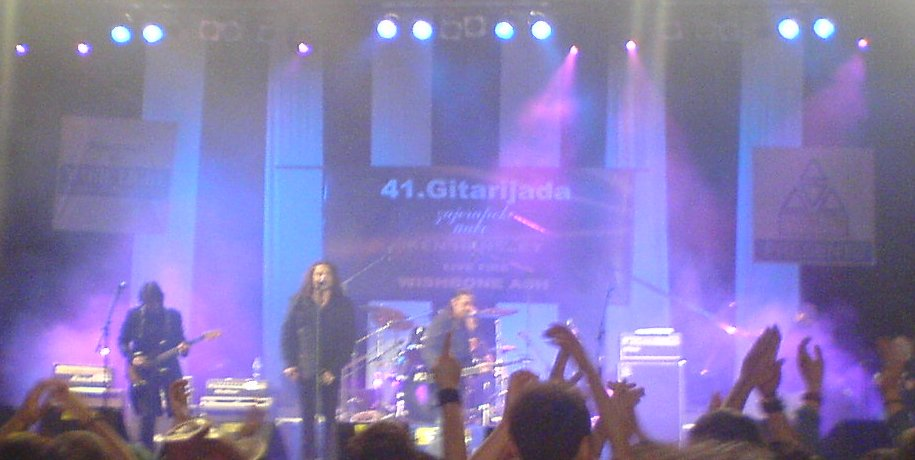
Divlje Jagode performing at Gitarijada festival in Zaječar in 2007

At the beginning of 2006, Galić returned to Divlje Jagode, along with long-time member Zlatan Čehić. During the same year, the band recorded the single "Piramida" ("Pyramid"), inspired by the reputed discovery of the Bosnian pyramids. During the same year, the band released the box set Collection, featuring all the studio albums by the band with redesigned album covers, Lipovača's solo album Magic Love, and the single "Piramida" on the bonus disc. In the spring of 2007, they released another single, a new version of their old song "Zvijezda sjevera" ("Star of the North"), sung by Čehić. In July 2007, together with Galić's former band Opća Opasnost, they play as an opening act at Whitesnake concert in Osijek.

Soon after, Galić left the band to rejoin Opća Opasnost, and was replaced by Marko Osmanović, formerly of the band Cota G4 from Daruvar. He would remain with the band until the beginning of 2013. During next several years, Divlje Jagode mainly toured across the region, playing local festivals and concerts, also having several international bouts. Within this time, the band did not hold a permanent lineup, with many former members joining on various occasions at live performances, while work on the next studio album was still in progress. The compilation album The Love Collection featured, alongside band's old love songs, the new song "Ne, nisam ja" ("No, It's Not Me").

The compilation was followed by the 2013 studio album Biodinamička ljubav (Biodynamic Love). The album was recorded with the band's new vocalist, Livio Berak. Berak was first spotted by Lipovača in 2010, during regional talent rock show Rat bendova (War of the Bands), in which Berak participated with his band Livio Berak Trio, reaching the finals. While on vocals, Berak also serves as a band's second guitar player. The album also featured the new bass guitarist András Ispán and the new keyboardist Damjan Deurić. Guest appearances on the album included the band's former vocalists Žanil Tataj and Marko Osmanović, singer Vlatka Pokos (on backing vocals), and the song "Do prvog dodira" ("Until the First Touch") featured Ivana Peters, frontess of the Belgrade band Negative, on lead vocals. Alongside well-received "Samo da znaš" ("You Should Know") and "Kad te netko spomene" ("When Someone Mentions You"), the album featured a new version of "Đavolji grad" ("Devil's City"), originally released on Čarobnjaci.

In 2016, Lipovača released his second solo album, Internal Waves of Love, featuring mostly instrumental compositions, with several tracks featuring former Black Sabbath member Tony Martin on vocals. In 2018, the band released two six-piece box sets, entitled Original Album Collection Vol.1 and Original Album Collection Vol.2, featuring all the studio albums by the band and Lipovača's Magic Love. On 10 June of the same year, the band performed as the opening act for Scorpions on their concert in Belgrade Arena. In the summer of 2019, the band marked 40 years of recording activity with a live performance in BHRT studio in Sarajevo. Many musicians who were members of the band at some point during their career joined them on stage, including former vocalists Anto Janković, Mladen Vojičić, Žanil Tataj, Pero Galiić and Marko Osmanović.

In 2020, the band released their latest studio album Jukebox. Alongside Berak, the album featured Anto Janković on vocals, once again as an official member of the band. The album was co-produced by Lipovača and Deurić and featured new members – bass guitarist Damjan Milenković and drummer Emir Kranjčić. The album featured the band's version of Ludwig van Beethoven's composition "Für Elise", as well as a new version of "Zauvjek tvoj", featuring Mladen Vojičić on vocals. The album also featured guest appearances by two other former members, Žanil Tataj and Sanin Karić. During the same year, the band's biography was published, authored by Stjepan Juras and entitled U malom vrtu raste divlji plod (A Wild Fruit Is Growing in a Small Garden), after a verse from the song "Divlje jagode". The limited edition of 200 copies of the book contained a DVD with photographs, press archive and a recording of the band's 1988 concert, originally made as a bootleg.

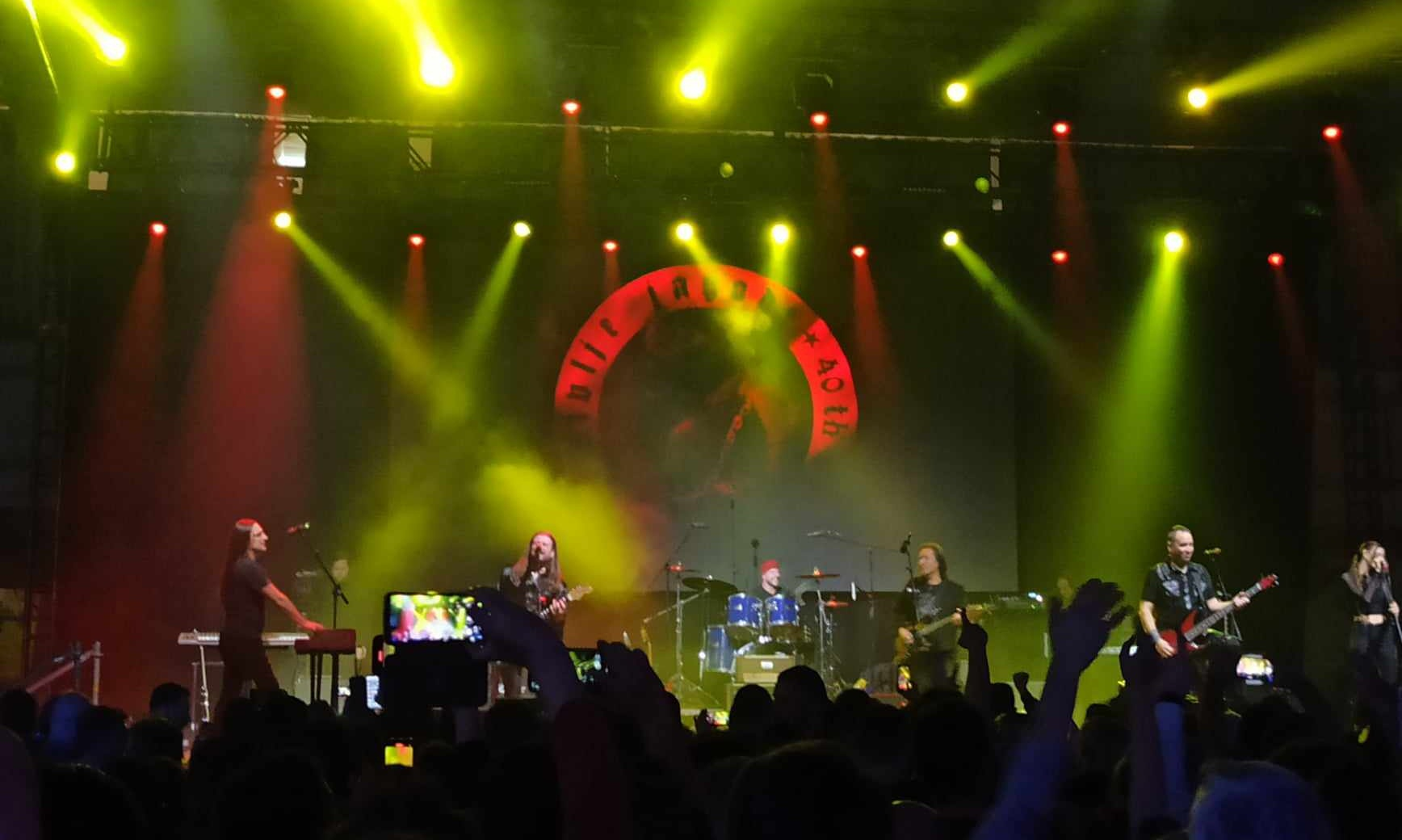
Divlje Jagode performing in Belgrade in 2022

In 2022, the band released the first live album in their career, Live in Beograd, with the recording of their concert held in Belgrade's Trade Union Hall on 8 October 2022. In 2024, the band released their latest studio album, Prati moje stare tragove (Follow My Old Footprints). The album was followed by promotional tour across former Yugoslav republics.

== Legacy ==
In 2017, Croatian band Ausswinkl Muzikanti recorded a folk cover of "Ne želiš kraj", with guest appearance by Anto Janković (who wrote the lyrics for the song, originally recorded by Divlje Jagode in 1982, with Islamović on vocals). In 2019, Swedish heavy metal band Enforcer recorded a cover of Divlje Jagode song "Let na drugi svijet", entitled "To Another World". On their performance at the 2019 Exit festival in Novi Sad, Serbia, the band performed the song with original lyrics. In 2023, Italian heavy metal band TYTUS recorded a cover of "Motori" for their EP Roaming in Despair.

In 2000, the song "Jedina moja" was polled No.89 on Rock Express Top 100 Yugoslav Rock Songs of All Times list.

== Members ==
=== Current members ===
- Toni Janković – lead vocals (1977–1982, 1983, 2005, 2019–present), backing vocals (1983)
- Zele Lipovača – guitar (1977–present), backing vocals (1982–present)
- Damjan Deurić – keyboards (2010–2015, 2017–present)
- András Ispán – bass (2012–2014, 2015–2016, 2021–present)
- Livio Berak – guitar, lead vocals (2013–present)
- Emil Kranjčić – drums (2018–present)

=== Former members ===
- Nihad Jusufhodzić – bass (1977–1979)
- Adonis Dokuzović – drums (1977–1979)
- Mustafa Ismailovski – keyboards (1978–1979)
- Nasko Budimlić – drums (1980–1987, 1989–1997, 1999–2002, 2011–2014)
- Alen Islamović – bass (1980–1984), backing vocals (1980–1982), lead vocals (1982–1986)
- Zlatan Čehić – bass (1984–1995, 2006–2012), backing vocals (1984–1994, 2006–2012), lead vocals (1995)
- Don Airey – keyboards (1985–1986)
- Mladen Vojičić – lead vocals (1987–1988)
- Edin Šehović – drums (1987–1988)
- Vlado Podany – keyboards (1987–1988)
- Zlatan Stipišić – lead vocals (1989–1990)
- Žanil Tataj – lead vocals (1991–1992, 1994–1999, 2002)
- Sanin Karić – bass (1995–1997, 2005–2006)
- Dejan Oresković – bass (1997–2004)
- Thomas Balaž – drums (1997–1999, 2002–2011)
- Dinko Salihbašić – lead vocals (2000–2002)
- Pero Galić – lead vocals (2002–2005, 2005–2008)
- Marko Osmanović – guitar, lead vocals (2008–2013)
- Nikola Milat – lead vocals (2013)
- Adrian Borić – drums (2014–2017), backing vocals (2015–2017)
- Damjan Mileković – bass, backing vocals (2014–2015, 2016–2021)

== Discography ==
=== Studio albums ===
- Divlje jagode (1978)
- Stakleni hotel (1981)
- Motori (1982)
- Čarobnjaci (1983)
- Vatra (1985)
- Wild Strawberries (as Wild Strawberries, 1987)
- Konji (1988)
- Labude, kad rata ne bude (1994)
- Sto vjekova (1997)
- Od neba do neba (2003)
- Biodinamička ljubav (2013)
- Jukebox (2020)
- Prati moje stare tragove (2024)

=== Live albums ===
- Live in Beograd (2023)

=== Compilations ===
- Najbolje (1986)
- Sarajevo, ti i ja (1993)
- Antologija 1 (1995)
- Antologija 2 (1995)
- The Very Best Of: Let na drugi svijet (2004)
- The Ultimate Collection (2008)
- The Love Collection: Najljepše ljubavne pjesme (2011)
- Greatest Hits (2015)

=== Box sets ===
- Collection (2006)
- Original Album Collection Vol.1 (2018)
- Original Album Collection Vol.2 (2018)

=== Video albums ===
- Divlje Jagode (2004)

=== Singles ===
- "Rock 'n' Roll" / "Jedina moja" (1977)
- "Moj dilbere" / "Prijatelj" (1977)
- "Patkica" / "Kad bi vi gospođo" (1978)
- "Nemam ništa protiv" / "Bit' će bolje!" (1979)
- "Konji" / "Turski marš" (1988)
- "Marija" (2003)
- "Dobro došla ljubavi" / "Marija" (2003)
- "Piramida" (2006)
- "Evo banke, Cigane moj" (2016)
