= Alen Islamović =

Bosnian singer (born 1957)

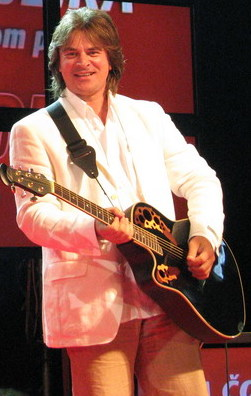
- Islamović performing in 2008

Background information
- Born: Alija Islamović; 17 August 1957 (age 68); Bihać, PR Bosnia and Herzegovina, FPR Yugoslavia
- Genres: Pop-rock; rock; pop-folk
- Occupation: Singer
- Instruments: Bass; vocals; guitar
- Years active: 1974–present
- Label: Nimfa Sound
- Formerly of: Divlje Jagode; Bijelo Dugme; 4 Asa; Srčani Udar
- Website: www.alen-islamovic.net

Alija "Alen" Islamović (born 17 August 1957) is a Bosnian rock vocalist. He is best known as the lead singer of Bosnian and Yugoslav rock bands Divlje jagode from 1981 to 1986 and Bijelo Dugme from 1986 to 1989.

Born Alija Islamović in Bihać into a Bosniak family from the nearby village of Sokolac where he'd spend the first two and a half years of his infancy, the youngster grew up with an older brother. Once their father found work in Bihać, the entire family relocated to the town proper. Islamović first accessed music in the late 1960s via his brother who brought home a turntable gramophone.

== Biography ==
=== Early life ===
Islamović learned to play guitar guided by his elder brother, and in 1974 he began playing bass guitar in a band called Bag. He started singing because his brother had many LP records, allowing him to learn the lyrics.

Soon, Islamović's local popularity grew as did his band's gig activity and he performed many concerts in the local region. In addition to Bihać, Bag performed in Prijedor, Drvar, Sanski Most, and Banja Luka, earning decent money. He was inspired by the music of Led Zeppelin, Deep Purple and Bijelo Dugme.

=== Divlje Jagode ===
When his band dissolved, Islamović started playing football in Jedinstvo from Bihać, then a second league club. After he served the army, Sead Lipovača, lead guitarist and founder of Divlje jagode, invited him to join the band. The start with Divlje jagode was very difficult, but it eventually paid off as the band became a very successful hard rock act throughout many parts of Yugoslavia. They were so promising that in April 1984 (when Željko Bebek left Bijelo Dugme) Islamović turned down Goran Bregović's offer to sing in Bijelo Dugme (this was partly result of his fear that Bebek might return to Dugme).

Eventually, when everything failed, Divlje jagode fell apart and Islamović returned to Bihać and decided to get a traditional job and quit music. But then came another offer from Goran Bregović (when Mladen Vojičić Tifa left Dugme) and this time he accepted.

=== Bijelo Dugme ===
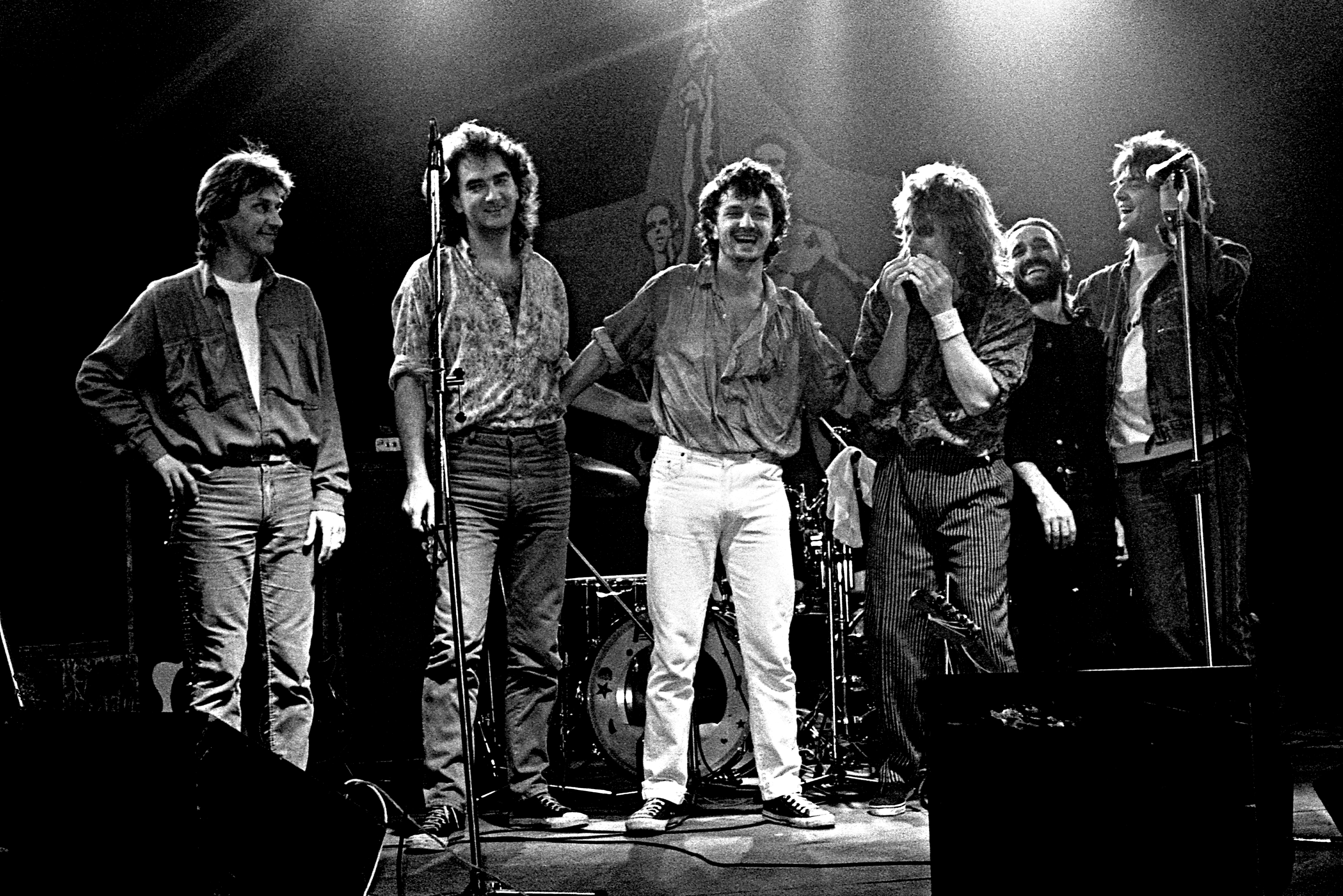
The last Bijelo Dugme lineup in 1986, from left to right: Vlado Pravdić, Ipe Ivandić, Goran Bregović, Islamović, Zoran Redžić and Laza Ristovski

At the time, the vocal capabilities of Islamović were questioned when it came to comparison with the former two singers. Bregović reportedly invited Islamović to join the band mainly for his healthy lifestyle (he allegedly stated that he had enough of drunkards and drug addicts).

He was right, and Islamović didn't let fame get to him. After each tour he returned home to Bihać where he'd run his bar, fish, and play table tennis. In 1989, Islamović left the Bijelo Dugme tour without notifying anybody from the band. He returned home in order to cure a kidney problem he developed on the road, forcing the cancellation of the rest of the tour. Although it seemed like a minor postponement at the time, it actually turned out to be the end of Bijelo Dugme. Soon the war started and the band went into a 15-year hiatus.

In total, Islamović recorded two studio albums with the group, Pljuni i zapjevaj moja Jugoslavijo in 1986 and Ćiribiribela in 1988 and one live album called Mramor, kamen i željezo in 1987. Joining Bijelo Dugme, Islamović became one of the most famous and recognizable musicians in Yugoslavia and in the whole region.

=== Post-Dugme ===
After getting back to good health, Islamović initially used this time off to record a 1989 solo album Haj, nek se čuje, čuje, haj, nek se zna. Except for the title song, the record received a lukewarm public response and was soon forgotten. When the Bosnian War started, he fled Bihać for Zagreb and recorded three albums there with mediocre results before returning to Bihać with the end of the war.

Islamović then took part in a duet with popular turbofolk singer Indira Radić on her album Pocrnela burma in 2002. The song they recorded together, "Lopov", went on to become a huge commercial hit. He would later do two more duets with her: "Imali smo, nismo znali" for her 2007 album Lepo se provedi and "Ljubav stara" for her 2011 album Istok, sever, jug i zapad.

In between his work with Radić, in 2005, Islamović took part in three large farewell concerts with Bijelo Dugme in Sarajevo, Zagreb and Belgrade. It was the band's first live appearance since 1989.

He also played rhythm guitar and sang in the band "4 Asa" with Vlado Kalember, Slavko Pintarić "Pišta", Rajko Dujmić, and Jurica Pađen. Islamović released the song "Mrtvo hladno" in February 2005 and the full album of the same name was released in April 2005 with a Canadian band called "Srčani Udar" (English translation: "Heart Attack"). The album featured 11 songs and a DVD bonus with two music videos and a 30-minute documentary "in the making". In October 2006, Islamović joined Željko Bebek and Mladen Vojičić Tifa in a Bijelo Dugme tribute band called "B.A.T. Together". They performed on numerous stages around the world between 2006 and 2010. B.A.T.'s 2006 U.S.-Canadian tour was filmed for a documentary titled B.A.T.: Balkan Rock Nostalgia, directed by Branislav Tatalović.

=== Present years ===
During 2012, a new single, "Heroin", along with two music videos, was released. It was written by Dejan Đurković "Englez", lead guitar player of "Srčani Udar". This was an announcement for Islamović's next studio album. On 15 August 2013, Islamović appeared at the Belgrade Beer Fest, with Kad bi bio Bijelo Dugme band, performing Bijelo Dugme songs, as well as his own solo material. This was his first large Belgrade show after many years, and second in front of thousands of people, after the Bijelo Dugme concert at Belgrade Hippodrome in 2005.

In 2014, Islamović released his new studio album entitled Alcatraz. This was his first new material since 2005 and the album Mrtvo Hladno with "Srčani Udar". The album was released in March through City Records.

Islamović, along with Goran Bregović, united once again in June 2014 for a Bijelo Dugme live concert at Ljubljana. What was initially planned as a 40th-anniversary reunion tour throughout entire region, came down only to the two of them, after financial disagreement with other members. After a successful show in front of more than 10,000 people, the entire tour was planned, being later on performed in Europe and the United States, with Islamović and Bregović as the only members.

In 2017, Islamović, along with Tifa, Bregović, and Bregović's Wedding and Funeral Orchestra, reunited for a United States tour under the Bijelo Dugme moniker. They played in Chicago on 23 November 2017, Atlanta on 24 November 2017, and New Jersey on 25 November 2017.

== Personal life ==
Islamović currently lives in Bihać. He is married and has two daughters. He funded the making of the Una Gem Tennis club in Bihać and is president of it.

In July 2026, Islamović made headlines for holding a concert in Kraljevo, Serbia on the 31st anniversary of the Srebrenica genocide. As a result, his performance as part of the Summer in the City 2026 festival in Zavidovići, Bosnia and Herzegovina was canceled. He apologized and called his decision to perform in Serbia on that date a "big oversight and mistake."

== Discography ==
=== Solo albums ===
- Haj, nek se čuje, čuje, haj, nek se zna (1989)
- Gdje je moj rođeni brat (1992)
- Hitovi (1994)
- Bauštelac (1994)
- Nema meni bez tebe (1995)
- Live Eurotour (1996)
- Samo nebo zna (1999)
- Divlje Dugme (2000)
- Istok, zapad, sjever, jug (2001)
- Hitovi za sva vremena (2005)
- 30 godina sa vama (2011)
- Alcatraz (2014)
- Tajno (2019)

=== Guest singles ===
- "Jugoslovenka" - with Lepa Brena on her album Četiri godine (1989)
- "Lopov" - with Indira Radić on her album Pocrnela burma (2002)
- "Imali smo, nismo znali" - with Indira Radić on her album Lepo se provedi (2007)
- "Ljubav stara" - with Indira Radić on her album Istok, sever, jug i zapad (2011)
- "Obećaj mi" - with Sanja Doležal (2011)
- "Još se branim ćutanjem" - with Milica Pavlović (2016)

=== Divlje Jagode ===
- Stakleni hotel (1981)
- Motori (1982)
- Čarobnjaci (1983)
- Vatra (1985)
- Wild Strawberries (1986)

=== Bijelo Dugme ===
==== Studio albums ====
- Pljuni i zapjevaj moja Jugoslavijo (1986)
- Ćiribiribela (1988)

==== Live albums ====
- Mramor, kamen i željezo (1987)
