= Ex YU rock enciklopedija =

2007 book by Petar Janjatović

- Author: Petar Janjatović
- Language: Serbian
- Published: Geopoetika 1998, 2001; Self-released 2007
- Publication place: Serbia
- Media type: Print
- Pages: 320 pages
- ISBN: 978-86-905317-1-4
- OCLC: 447000661
- Preceded by: Ilustrovana ex YU rock enciklopedija 1960–2000

Ex YU rock enciklopedija (transl. Ex YU Rock Encyclopedia) is a book by Serbian author, journalist and music critic Petar Janjatović. It was first published in 1998 under the title Ilustrovana YU rock enciklopedija 1960–1997 (transl. Illustrated YU Rock Encyclopedia 1960–1997) and has since received four expanded editions. The book features information about most important acts of the rock scene of Socialist Federal Republic of Yugoslavia, as well as of scenes of the successor states.

== Background ==
The book contains biographies and discographies of the most important acts of the Yugoslav rock scene, as well as of the scenes of the successor states. Besides rock acts in the traditional sense of the term, the book features blues, reggae, world music, hip hop, ambient and avant-garde music acts. The book also contains basic information about a large number of less notable acts, but incorporated into the articles about related notable acts. The book also features an appendix with the information about most notable Yugoslav rock music festivals and magazines.

=== Ilustrovana YU rock enciklopedija 1960–1997 (1998) ===
The first edition of the book, entitled Ilustrovana YU rock enciklopedija 1960–1997, was published in 1998. In the foreword, Janjatović states that, in the early 1980s, he and Dragan Kremer were offered to write the encyclopedia of Yugoslav rock, but that they declined, as it was the time of Yugoslav new wave's heyday, and two of them believed that it was to early for that sort of publication. However, they were prepared to write the encyclopedia of Yugoslav rock in the future, and Janjatović started to collect the material for the future release. At the beginning of the 1990s, at the time of breakup of Yugoslavia, Janjatović started working on the book:

And just as a bear runs away from the long winter to several-month long sleep, I was running away from the stupid 1990s, TV shows, idiotic politicians, inflation, deflation and penetration to writing a book. With headphones on my ears, with my head stuck into old magazines, I was poisoning myself with better past, with rock scene of the 1960s, 1970s and 1980s and with what survived in the 1990s. And here, on today's day, December 1, 1997, the text of the encyclopedia is finished.

The first edition of the book features biographies and discographies of the acts which gained the attention of the public during the existence of SFR Yugoslavia, including information about their activity after the breakup of the country. From the acts which gained the public's attention after the breakup of Yugoslavia, Janjatović included only artists from FR Yugoslavia (consisting of Serbia and Montenegro). He stated that he believed that the rock scenes of Slovenia, Croatia, Bosnia and Herzegovina and Macedonia were independent scenes with little connection to FR Yugoslav scene.

=== Ilustrovana ex YU rock enciklopedija 1960–2000 (2001) ===
The second edition of the book, entitled Ilustrovana ex YU rock enciklopedija 1960–2000, was published in 2001. In the foreword to the second edition Janjatović states:

It's been three years since the publishing of the previous book, and a lot of things have changed. The leaders that made our life miserable are definitely history. Just today, on the day I'm writing this text, Slobodan Milošević was arrested. And two days ago, I was at a Psihomodo Pop concert in New Belgrade Sports Hall. On the very same place, in December 2000, KUD Idijoti performed, and after them Darko Rundek with his band [...] After Rambo Amadeus, a great number of bands from Serbia performed in Croatia. [...] But there's no need to rush in. It's easier to destroy than to build.

As the previous edition, the second edition featured acts from FR Yugoslavia, but not from other SFR Yugoslavia successor states.

=== Ex YU rock enciklopedija 1960–2006 (2007) ===
The third edition of the book, entitled Ex YU rock enciklopedija 1960–2006, was published in 2007. In the foreword, Janjatović states that, thanks to the changed political situation and the Internet, the bonds between scenes of former Yugoslav republics were reestablished. This is one of the reasons he decided to, for the first time, include acts from all former Yugoslav republics into the book. The third edition of the book is divided into three sections: "SFRY", "Serbia" and "The World", "The World" featuring a choice of acts from other former Yugoslav republics, but also the bands formed by former Yugoslav musicians in other countries (like Emir & Frozen Camels and Kultur Shock).

== Acts ==
=== Yugoslavia (1960–1991) ===
Letter	Artists
A	Aerodrom – Aleksandar Makedonski – Alisa – Amajlija – Ambasadori – Anastasia – Animatori – Arhangel – Tihomir "Pop" Asanović – Atomi – Atomsko Sklonište – Automobili – Azra
B	Momčilo Bajagić "Bajaga" – Đorđe Balašević – Balkan – Banana – Bastion – Željko Bebek – Bebi Dol – Toma Bebić – Begnagrad – Neno Belan – Bel Tempo – Bele Višnje – Bele Vrane – Beograd – Bezimeni – Bezobrazno Zeleno – Bijele Strijele – Bijelo Dugme – Biseri – Blues Kvintet – Blues Trio – Boa – Bombaj Štampa – Borghesia – Boye – Marko Brecelj – Goran Bregović – Buco i Srđan – Buldogi – Buldožer – Bulevar – Bumerang
C	Cacadou Look – Center Za Demumanizacijo – COD – Crni Biseri – Crvena Jabuka – Crveni Koralji – Dejan Cukić – Cvrčak i Mravi
Č	Čista Proza – Zdravko Čolić – Nikola Čuturilo
D	DAG – Dah – Daleka Obala – Daltoni – Dʼ Boys – Del Arno Band – Milan Delčić – Delfini (Split) – Delfini (Zagreb) – Demolition Group – Den Za Den – Denis & Denis – Di Luna Blues Band – Dinamiti – Disciplina Kičme – Vladimir Divljan – Divlje Jagode – Divlji Anđeli – Dogovor iz 1804. – Doktor Spira i Ljudska Bića – Tomaž Domicelj – Dorian Gray – Drugi Način – Du Du A – 2227 – Dino Dvornik
Đ	Đavoli – Dragoljub Đuričić
Dž	Džentlmeni
E	Ekatarina Velika – Električni Orgazam – Elektroni – Elipse – Elvis J Kurtovich & His Meteors
F	Marjeta "Neca" Falk – Faraoni – Film – Fit – Formula 4
G	Galija – Garavi Sokak – Gastrbajtrs – Generacija 5 – Gibonni – Gordi – Gori Uši Winnetou – Grad – Grč – Grešnici – Griva – Grupa 220 – Grupa I – Grupa Marina Škrgatića – Gustaph y Njegovi Dobri Duhovi
H	Saša Habić – Hari Mata Hari – Haustor – Henda – Heroina – Heroji – Hladno Pivo – Hobo
I	Idoli – Igra Staklenih Perli – Aleksandar "Sanja" Ilić – Indexi – Instant Karma – Iskre – Alen Islamović – ITD Band – Izazov
J	Jakarta – Jugosloveni – Ibrica Jusić – Jutro
K	Kameleoni – Karlowy Vary – KBO! – Kerber – Kongres – Kontraritam – Korni Grupa – Boris Kovač – Kornelije Kovač – Jani Kovačić – Zdenka Kovačiček – Kozmetika – Vlado Kreslin – KUD Idijoti
L	Laboratorija Zvuka – Lačni Franz – Laibach – Laki Pingvini – Laufer – Leb i Sol – Le Cinema – Let 3 – Josipa Lisac – Milan "Mile" Lojpur – Lola V Stain – Peter "Pero" Lovšin – Lublanski Psi – Luna – Lutajuća Srca
М	Majke – Oliver Mandić – Zlatko Manojlović – Đorđe Marjanović – Srđan Marjanović – Martin Krpan – Branko Marušić "Čutura" – Seid Memić "Vajta" – Memorija – Merlin – Messerschmitt – Metak – Karlo Metikoš – Aleksander Mežek – Mi – Miladojka Youneed – Aleksandra "Slađana" Milošević – Mizar – Mladi – Mladi Levi – Drago Mlinarec – More
N	Na Lepem Prijazni – Napred U Prošlost – Neki To Vole Vruće – Nervozni Poštar – Niet – Nirvana – Novi Fosili – Boris Novković
O	O'Hare – Obojeni Program – Oko – Oktobar 1864 – Opus – Osmi Putnik – Osvajači – Otroci Socializma
P	Pankrti – Paraf – Parni Valjak – Partibrejkers – Parlament – Patrola – Pekinška Patka – Tomaž Pengov – Marina Perazić – Ivica Percl – Petar i Zli Vuci – Petar Pan – Miloš Petrović – Piloti – Alenka Pinterič – Plamenih 5 – Plava Trava Zaborava – Plavi Orkestar – Point Blank – Polska Maca – Pomaranča – Pop Mašina – Porodična Manufaktura Crnog Hleba – Poslednja Igra Leptira – Zoran Predin – Predmestje – Dušan Prelević – Pridigarji – Prljavo Kazalište – Pro Arte – Prva Ljubav – Psihomodo Pop
R	Rambo Amadeus – Regata – Revolveri – Rex Ilusivii – Rezonansa – Riblja Čorba – Laza Ristovski – Ritam Nereda – Roboti – Roze Poze – Darko Rundek – Ruž
S	Satan Panonski – Samonikli – San – Sanjalice – SCH – September – SexA – Siluete – Zoran Simjanović – Sirova Koža – Slomljena Stakla – Smak – Smeli – Sokoli – Tomi Sovilj – The Spoons – Srebrna Krila – Ivan "Piko" Stančić – Stidljiva Ljubičica – Stijene – Jadranka Stojaković – Perica Stojančić – Stop – S.T.R.A.H. – S Vremena Na Vreme – Suncokret
Š	Šarlo Akrobata – Andrej Šifrer – Miladin Šobić
T	Tako – Termiti – Terusi – Teška Industrija – Robert Tilly – Time and Dado Topić – Toni Montano – Trivalia – Trula Koalicija – Tunel – Tutti Frutti Band – Tvrdo Srce i Velike Uši
U	Uragani – U Škripcu
V	Valentino – Vampiri – Van Gogh – Tihomir "Tini" Varga – Vatreni Poljubac – Goran Vejvoda – Videosex – Viktorija – Vještice – Vlada i Bajka – Mladen Vojičić "Tifa" – Vojvođanski Bluz Bend – Vreme i Zemlja – Vrisak Generacije
X&Y	Xenia – YU Grupa
Z	Zabranjeno Pušenje – Zana – Zdravo – Zebra – Zlatni Akordi – Zlatni Dečaci – Zlatni Prsti – Zona B – Zvijezde
Ž	Žeteoci

=== Serbia (1991–2006) ===
Artists
Atheist Rap – BAAL – Babe – Bad Copy – Beogradski Sindikat – Bjesovi – Block Out – Braća Left – Bukvar Bukvar – Cactus Jack – Čovek Bez Sluha – Darkwood Dub – Deca Loših Muzičara – Direktori – Doghouse – Dža ili Bu – Darko Džambasov – Džukele – E-Play – Eva Braun – Eyesburn – Familija – Generacija Bez Budućnosti – Gluve Kučke – Goblini – Goribor – Gru – Vasil Hadžimanov – Hazari – Intruder – Irfan Muertes – Jarboli – J.U.S.T. – Kanal Tvid – Kanda, Kodža i Nebojša – Kazna Za Uši – K2 – Klinički Mrtav – Kontrabanda – Kristali – The Kuguars – Lajko Felix – Lee Man – Lira Vega – Lutke – Love Hunters – Madame Piano – Marčelo – Minstrel – Mistake Mistake – NBG – Negative – Neočekivana Sila Koja Se Iznenada Pojavljuje i Rešava Stvar – Neverne Bebe – Night Shift – Ništa Ali Logopedi – Novembar – Orthodox Celts – Oružjem Protivu Otmičara – Overdrive – Nikola Pejaković "Kolja" – Plejboj – Popcycle – Popečitelji – Ana Popović – Ognjen Popović – Presing – Prljavi Inspektor Blaža i Kljunovi – Qrve – Rare – Simić Quartet – Six Pack – Ana Stanić – Straight Jackin' – Sunshine – Supernaut – Super s Karamelom – Sve ili Ništa – Šablon – 357 – Urgh! – Veliki Prezir – Viborg Dallas – Voja Vijatov – Voodoo Popeye – VROOM – Vladan Vučković – Who Is the Best – X Centar – Zbogom Brus Li – Zvoncekova Bilježnica

=== "The world" (1991–2006) ===
Artists
The Bambi Molesters – Blla Blla Blla – The Books of Knjige – Edo Maajka – Elvis Jackson – Emir & Frozen Camels – En Face – Erogene Zone – Foltin – Kultur Shock – Vladimir Maraš – Monteniggers – Pips, Chips & Videoclips – Res Nullius – Revolt – Siddharta – Vasko Serafimov – Sikter – Skroz – String Forces – Superhiks – Zaklonišče Prepeva

== Reactions and critical reception ==
=== First edition ===
In the first edition, reviews of music critics Petar "Peca" Popović and Ivan Ivačković were published. Popović wrote:

Ilustrovana YU Rock Ennciklopedija is the first work of this kind offered to the judgement of the public. This book is a milestone.

Ivačković wrote:

When I received the news that Janjatović is working on this book, i made the expression of a bodybuilder who just dropped the heaviest weight on his foot. I knew, as the author of the encyclopedia knew, that it is a job which requires the kind of effort which is often bordering masochism. I'm not saying that busts of Janjatović should be erected in all larger cities of former Yugoslavia, but one thing is certain: with the appearances of his book the competition for the biggest achievement in the field of Yugoslav rock literature is closed, forever.

Milan Vlajčić, in the review published in Serbian newspaper Politika, wrote:

Janjatović's writing is knowing, fastidious when needed and always interesting. The articles are written with caring, critically tested style, with fine anecdotes in the right places and tastefully used judgements. The biographies of the most famous groups are like miniature novels.

Ivan Marković, in the review published in Bosnian newspaper Oslobođenje, wrote:

One thing is certain: this book will find its place in many homes, but in the media houses as well. Younger colleagues, who are just starting to write about events on the rock scene, will have an irreplaceable tool in their work, which will help them exclude all possible factual mistakes.

Zvezdan Georgijevski, in the review published in Macedonian magazine Puls, wrote:

A book you must have, if for no other reason than as a memory of the years of lead, when we were a country with one of the strongest rock scenes in Europe. And then we freed ourselves from the shackles, and four free countries with the strongest turbo folk scenes in the world were created.

The book was also praised in reviews in Serbian magazine Vreme, Montenegrin newspaper Vijesti and Bosnian magazine Fan.

There were also negative reactions. A part of Croatian public felt provoked with the fact that Riblja Čorba got more space than any other act in the book, far more than most popular Croatian bands like Parni Valjak and Prljavo Kazalište. In his review, published in Croatian newspaper Večernji list, Darko Glavan wrote:

Beware of Serbs writing yu-rock encyclopedias, that could be the title of this short review of what is, in my knowledge, the first yu-rock encyclopedia [...] Before several remarks, which are quite serious in my opinion, we must admit that Ilustrovana Yu rock encikloedija is, in many aspects, a project far more serious and systematic than Mala enciklopedija hrvatske rock i pop glazbe [Small Encyclopedia of Croatian Rock and Pop music, written by several authors]. [...] About two pages about Parni Valjak and less than a page about Prljavo Kazalište are approximately proportional to Bijelo Dugme, but it is simply offensive to give the same space to entire careers of leading Croatian bands with rich discography, and to the stories about youth deliqts and problematic political statements of Bora Đorđević.

On the other hand, in the review published in Serbian newspaper Naša Borba, Srđan D. Stojanović wrote:

The main flaw of Janjatović's book is the fact that he is impressed with western parts of former SFRY, so almost all the bands from garages and basements of Slovenian villages got articles in this encyclopedia, while even some discographically relevant bands from inner Serbia were left out.

In the review published in Bosnian magazine Slobodna Bosna, Edin Avdić wrote:

Although Janjatović had an apolitical approach, if we bear in mind everything that happened in the last seven or eight years on the territory of the country that broke up, YU Rock Encyclopedia lacks information about national-chauvinistic engagements of some bands.

=== Second edition ===
Nebojša Grujičić, in the review published in Vreme, wrote:

'You are a Greater Serbia-oriented Croatophile!', is what Croatian writer Zoran Ferić said to Janjatović, reacting to controversies that followed the appearance of the first edition of his Ilustrovana Yu-rock enciklopedija 1960–1997, in the spring of 1998. Most of the reviews at the time were highly positive, but there were different opinions too. In Belgrade, Janjatović was accused of being too impressed with western parts of the former SFRY, in Zagreb it was quite the opposite, with the warning 'Beware of Serbs writing Yu rock encyclopedias', while in Sarajevo they accused Janjatović of being apolitical [...] reactions to the Encyclopedia were paradigmatic for the Balkan business from the end of the 20th century. The appearance of the second edition of Yu rock encyclopedia represents a publishing accomplishment and a first-rate event which causes respect and attention, just as three years ago, when the book appeared for the first time.

=== Third edition ===
The review published in Serbian newspaper Danas stated:

That sort of SUCCESS (it deserves capital letters, when we bear in mind the country in which it happens, and even more when we include the moment in which it happens), can be described as an ideal mixture of love, talent and hard work. Petar Janjatović, however, [...] did not give himself to smugness. Aware of the fact that he is not impeccable, he is continuing his, now already ex-yu, rock journey, crowning it with the third, this year's edition of something that, in this form, has not been seen on the territory of the former SFRY, but also beyond it. Now already Ex-yu rock encyclopedia has reached 320 pages, which contain readable history of rock and roll in one, larger part of Europe.

In the review published on Serbian web magazine Popboks, Dimitrije Vojnov wrote:

From time to time, not even from time to time, actually, only once appears a publication to which the internet can't do a thing, except to illegally distribute its scanned versions. That publication is Petar Janjatović's Ex-YU Rock Encyclopedia. [...] Petar Janjatović made a capital publication, which contains the history and the discography of Yugoslav rock and roll. Although fans of some bands can say that some got less space than the others [...] when all is said and done, space and attention are justly distributed, in accordance with the popularity and the attention that the bands had in Yugoslav rock and roll reality. Which is even more important, Janjatović manages to pass unharmed and very objectively through writing about authors that went through unbelievable aesthetical and ideological transformations, and to correctly demarcate previous feats and later downfalls, which is very important when it comes to acts like Riblja Čorba or Prljavo Kazalište [...] There is no need to talk about how big accomplishment this book represents.

The third edition of the book saw some criticism by a part of heavy metal community, because, Janjatović, although including most notable Yugoslav heavy metal acts into the book, did not include pioneers of Yugoslav extreme metal like Heller and Bombarder, and some younger acts that gained large popularity, like Alogia and Kraljevski Apartman.

== See also ==
- Ex-Yu Rock Centar
