= List of beat bands =

This is a list of beat bands. Beat is a genre of rock music and R'n'B developed around Liverpool in the late 1950s. Freakbeat subsequently grew out of the beat-scene in the 1960s, simultaneously with the Netherlands-specific Nederbeat-scene, the Italian beat-scene and the Yugoslav beat-scene.

== Beat bands ==
- The Aces (rock and roll band)
- The Applejacks (British band)
- The Beatles
- Blossom Toes
- Cliff Bennett and the Rebel Rousers
- The Blackbirds (German band)
- The Cryin' Shames
- Lee Curtis and the All-Stars
- The Dakotas (band)
- The Dave Clark Five
- The Dennisons
- The Equals
- The Escorts (British band)
- Faron's Flamingos
- The Fortunes
- The Fourmost
- Freddie and the Dreamers
- Gerry and the Pacemakers
- Herman's Hermits
- The Hideaways (band)
- The Hollies
- The Honeycombs
- The Hullaballoos
- Ian and the Zodiacs
- Peter Jay and the Jaywalkers
- The John Barry Seven
- John's Children
- Johnny Kidd & the Pirates
- Kingsize Taylor and the Dominoes
- The Liverbirds
- Liverpool Five
- The Lords (German band)
- Manfred Mann
- The Merseybeats
- The Mindbenders
- The Mojos
- The Moody Blues
- The Nashville Teens
- Olympic '64
- The Puppets
- The Rockin' Berries
- The Rockin' Vickers
- The Searchers (band)
- Small Faces
- The Sorrows
- The Swinging Blue Jeans
- The Tremeloes
- Tages (band)
- The Undertakers (band)
- The Warriors (British band)
- Wimple Winch
- The Zombies

== Freakbeat bands ==
- The Action
- The Attack (band)
- The Birds (band)
- Dave Dee, Dozy, Beaky, Mick & Tich
- Downliners Sect
- The Easybeats
- The Fleur de Lys
- Pretty Things
- The Rattles
- The Rokes
- St. Louis Union
- The Syn
- The Syndicats
- Tomorrow (band)
- The Toggery Five
- The Troggs

== Nederbeat bands ==
- The Cats (Dutch band)
- Cuby + Blizzards
- The Motions (band)
- The Outsiders (Dutch band)
- Q65 (band)
- Sandy Coast
- The Shoes (Dutch band)
- Shocking Blue
- Tee-Set

== Italian beat bands ==
- Dik Dik
- Equipe 84
- New Trolls
- Nomadi
- Stormy Six

== Yugoslav beat bands ==
- Bijele Strijele
- Biseri
- Crni Biseri
- Crveni Koralji
- Daltoni
- Delfini (Split band)
- Delfini (Zagreb band)
- Dinamiti
- Džentlmeni
- Elipse
- Faraoni
- Iskre
- Kameleoni
- Mi
- Mladi
- O'Hara
- Plamenih 5
- Samonikli
- Sanjalice
- Siluete
- Žeteoci
