= BOOM Festival =

Former rock music festival in Yugoslavia

- Genre: Rock
- Locations: Maribor (1971); Ljubljana (1972-1974); Zagreb (1975); Belgrade (1976); Novi Sad (1977-1978)
- Years active: 1971 – 1978

BOOM Festival was a rock music festival held annually throughout SFR Yugoslavia between 1971 and 1978. Initially known as Pop Festival, then Boom Pop Festival, and finally just as BOOM Festival, the event was first held in 1971 in Maribor, while its last edition took place in 1978 in Novi Sad.

Organized and sponsored by the Socialist Youth League (SSOJ), the youth wing of Yugoslavia's ruling and only political party, the Communist League (SKJ), the festival featured numerous prominent acts of the Yugoslav rock scene. Five various artists live albums were recorded at various editions of the festival.

== History ==
#	Year	Location	Dates	Performers	Notes
1	1971	Ljudski vrt Stadium, Maribor	May 29	Termiti, Delial, Jutro, Bumerang, Krik, Grešnici, Faraoni, Grupa 220, Rebus, Tomaž Domicelj	Originally entitled Pop Festival Maribor 71.
2	1972	Tivoli Hall, Ljubljana, SR Slovenia	April 21-22	Nirvana, Indexi, Ivica Kiš, Alarm, Grupa 777, Mladi Levi, Had, Ivica Percl, Time, Grupa Marina Škrgatića, Trio Neda, Dario i Miljenko, Jutro, Bumerang, Dekameroni, Tomaž Domicelj	Selected live performances from the festival were co-released by Slovenijakoncert and Helidon as the double live album Pop Festival Ljubljana 72.
3	1973	Tivoli Hall, Ljubljana, SR Slovenia	April 20-21	YU Grupa, Buco i Srđan, Ave, Srce, Jutro, Zdenka Kovačiček, Nirvana, Rock Express, Drago Mlinarec, Ivica Percl, Dah, Time, Grupa 777, Grupa 220, Lambert Shop, Clan, Grupa Marina Škrgatića, Pop Mašina, Srđan Marjanović, Bumerang, Ganeša, Tajga, Spirit	Selected live performances from the festival were released by Jugoton as the double live album Boom Pop Fest '73.
4	1974	Tivoli Hall, Ljubljana, SR Slovenia	May 10-11	Bijelo Dugme, Bumerang, Cvrčak i Mravi, Tomaž Domicelj, Hobo, Grupa 220, Jutro, Ivica Percl, Prošlo Vrijeme, S Vremena Na Vreme, Sedam Svetlobnih Let, Sunce, Zenit, YU Grupa, Drago Mlinarec, Nirvana, Grupa Marina Škrgatića, Boom '74 Pop Selekcija	The supergroup Boom '74 Pop Selekcija was formed specially for the occasion; it featured members of the bands that played on the festival, but also the composer Miljenko Prohaska and the members of Ljubljana Symphony Orchestra. Selected live performances from the festival were released by Jugoton as the double live album Boom Pop Festival Ljubljana '74.
5	1975	Zagreb, SR Croatia	May 31	Time, Torr, Ivica Percl, Crčak i Mravi, Drago Mlinarec i Spektar, Buldožer, Tomaž Domicelj, Grupa 220, More, Bijelo Dugme, Zdenka Kovačiček i Pop Selekcija, Teška Industrija, Kamen Na Kamen, Smak, Formula 4, Vulkan	
6	1976	Pionir Hall, Belgrade, SR Serbia	June 16	Smak, YU Grupa, Time, September, More, Buldožer, Suncokret, Parni Valjak, Teška Industrija, Zdenka Express, Process, Torr, Oliverova Beogradska Reprezentacija	It was originally planned for the festival to be held at Tašmajdan Stadium, but it was moved to Pionir Hall due to bad weather conditions. The concert was opened with Korni Grupa song "Ivo Lola". Most of the bands performed for a symbolic fee of 1 Yugoslav dinar; their travelling expenses were partially covered by PGP-RTB record label. The concert featured about 6.500 spectators. Selected live performances from the festival were released by PGP-RTB as the live album BOOM '76.
7	1977	Sajmište, Novi Sad, SR Serbia	December 10-11	Ibn Tup, Tetka Ana, Čerge, Neoplanti, Cvrčak i Mravi, Leb i Sol, PU, Tako, Suncokret, Zebra, Buldožer, Tomaž Domicelj, Parni Valjak, Stakleno Zvono, Vatra, Smak, Zlatni Prsti, Vatreni Poljubac, Zmaj od Bosne, Teatar Levo	Selected live performances from the festival were released by Suzy as the double live album BOOM '77.
8	1978	Sajmište, Novi Sad, SR Serbia	December 10-11	Aerodrom, Generacija 5, Riblja Čorba, Suncokret, Zvuk Ulice, Gordi, Izazov, Bumerang, Paraf, Prljavo Kazalište, Pekinška Patka, Den Za Den, Galija, Tako, Tomaž Domicelj, Vatreni Poljubac, Leb i Sol	

Grupa Šta, Novi Sad

== See also ==
- List of historic rock festivals
- List of jam band music festivals
