= Les Fantômes =

Les Fantômes may refer to:

- Les Fantômes (band), French band
- Ghost Trail (Les Fantômes), 2024 film directed by Jonathan Millet
- The Ghosts (Les Fantômes), 2018 film directed by Alexandre Vallès
- Les Fantomes, monument sculpture by Paul Landowski at the French memorial to the Second Battle of the Marne which stands upon the Butte de Chalmont in Northern France
