= Nirvana (Yugoslav band) =

Yugoslav progressive rock band

Background information
- Origin: Zagreb, SR Croatia, SFR Yugoslavia
- Genres: Progressive rock
- Years active: 1970–1976
- Labels: PGP-RTB
- Past members: Krešimir Šoštar; Zdravko Štimac; Tomas Krkač; Slavko Pintarić

Nirvana was a Yugoslav progressive rock band formed in Zagreb in 1970. Nirvana was a prominent act of the 1970s Yugoslav rock scene.

== Band history ==
=== 1970–1976 ===
Nirvana was formed in Zagreb in 1970 by Krešimir Šoštar (guitar, formerly of the bands Mladi, Grešnici and Psalentas), Zdravko Štimac (drums, formerly of Mladi Lavovi and Psalentas) and Tomas Krkač (bass guitar, formerly of Mladi and Psalentas). At the time of the band formation, Šoštar was a student of Indology, in which the other two were also interested, thus naming the band Nirvana. Initially, the band performed covers of Taste, Grand Funk Railroad and other acts, gaining attention of the public as competent instrumentalists.

Due to their reputation of a popular live act, the band appeared on numerous festivals throughout Yugoslavia. In 1972, the band performed on the first edition of BOOM Festival, held in Tivoli Hall in Ljubljana. The recordings of their songs "222" and "Pred tvojim vratima" ("At Your Door") appeared on the double live album Pop Festival Ljubljana 72 recorded on the festival. They performed on the second edition of the festival, also held in Tivoli Hall, with the recordings of their song "Klik tema broj 1" ("Click Theme No.1"), which they performed with singer Zdenka Kovačiček, appearing on the double live album Boom Pop Fest '73. During the same year, Krkač was replaced by Slavko Pintarić Pišta.

In 1975, the band released their only record, the 7-inch single with the songs "Duh" ("Spirit", a cover of the Gary Moore song "Spirit") and "Kome da kažem" ("Who Should I Tell"). They ended their activity in 1976.

=== Post breakup ===
In 1979, Krkač formed the band Telefon (Telephone). The band featured his brother Tomislav Krkač (guitar), Srđan Jug (formerly of the band Sunce, vocals) and Krešimir Randić (drums). In 1982, they were joined by Neven Mijač (harmonica). The band released two 7-inch singles and appeared on one various artists album before ending their activity in 1983. In 2003, the Telefon compilation album 79-83 was released, featuring their studio recordings and a live recording of the song "Train". After the disbandment of Telefon, Tomas Krkač continued his career in the club bands Call 66 and Telephone Blues Band, which featured prominent musicians Vedran Božić (guitar), Walter Neugebauer (keyboards), Piko Stančić (drums) and Slavko Pintarić. Call 66 and Telephone Blues Band performed mostly rock standards, releasing the split live album Looking Back Vol 1. – Dance Rock Session in 1983. The album was recorded on the concert these two bands held in Zagreb's Kulušić club. In 1994, Telephone Blues Band released the live album Telephone Blues Band & All Stars Session, recorded on their concerts held in the club Saloon on 28 and 29 of March 1994, featuring guest appearances by Josipa Lisac, Zdenka Kovačiček, Oliver Dragojević, Neno Belan and other artists. On 20 November 1995, Telephone Blues Band and guitarist Phil Shackleton held a concert in Kulušić club, the recording of which was released on the live album Live in Zagreb during the same year. In 1996, Krkač released the album Fluid, featuring instrumentals he composed during the 1987–1995 period, including the music for the plays Tango Is a Sad Thought to Be Danced and Fluid by Zagreb Dance Ensemble. In 2003, the compilation album Rock portret (Rock Portrait) was released, featuring recordings from all the phases of Krkač's musical career.

Krešimir Šoštar performed with the band Likosi (Characters), recording the 1984 album Zvona zvone (The Bells Are Tolling) with them. He died in 1990.

== Discography ==
=== Singles ===
- "Duh" / "Kome da kažem" (1975)

=== Other appearances ===
- "222" / "Pred tvojim vratima" (Pop Festival Ljubljana 72, 1972)
- "Klik tema broj 1" (With Zdenka Kovačiček, Boom Pop Fest '73, 1973)
