= Grupa Marina Škrgatića =

Yugoslav progressive rock band

Background information
- Origin: Zagreb, SR Croatia, SFR Yugoslavia
- Genres: Progressive rock
- Years active: 1970–1976
- Labels: Suzy, Jugoton
- Past members: Marin Škrgatić; Mladen Leib; Branko Kezele; Dragan Brčić; Miro Matošević; Rajko Dujmić; Vladimir Georgev; Hrvoje Galeković

Grupa Marina Škrgatića (transl. Marin Škrgatić Band) was a Yugoslav progressive rock band formed in Zagreb in 1970. Fronted by vocalist and trombonist Marin Škrgatić, the group was a prominent act of the 1970s Yugoslav rock scene.

== Band history ==
=== 1970–1976 ===
The band was formed in 1970 in Zagreb. The forming members of the band were Marin Škrgatić (formerly of Soul Soul Band, vocals and trombone), Mladen Leib (guitar, bassoon), Branko Kezele (bass guitar, clarinet), Dragan Brčić (drums, viola) and Miro Matošević (percussion, oboe). During the following years Rajko Dujmić (organ, electric violin), Vladimir Georgev (bass guitar) and Hrvoje Galeković (drums) also performed with the band.

Soon after the formation, the band attracted the attention of the audience and the media with their avant-garde approach to rock music. Only several months after the formation, they got the opportunity to make recordings for Radio Zagreb. During the early 1970s they presented themselves to the audience in major centers of Yugoslav rock scene: in Ljubljana they performed on the initial editions of the BOOM Festival, in Belgrade they performed on the concerts organized by Pop Mašina in Belgrade Sports Hall, and in Zagreb they held regular club performances. Their song "Smij se" ("Laugh") appeared on the double live album Pop Festival Ljubljana 72 recorded on the 1972 edition of the BOOM Festival. In 1973, the band released their debut record, the 7-inch single with the songs "Beži Janke" ("Get Away, Janke") and "Vjeruj" ("Believe") through Suzy record label. In 1974, they released two more single records, both through Jugoton record label: the first one featured the songs "Rokoko" ("Rococo") and "Čežnja" ("Longing"), and the second one featured the songs "Tina" and "Budi tu" ("Be There").

In 1975, Škrgatić took part in the Rock Fest '75, the gathering of the most popular Yugoslav singers of the time; besides Škrgatić, the event featured Željko Bebek (of Bijelo Dugme), Mato Došen (of Hobo), Aki Rahimovski (of Parni Valjak), Seid Memić "Vajta" (of Teška Industrija), Boris Aranđelović (of Smak), Hrvoje Marjanović (of Grupa 220), Dado Topić (of Time) and Janez Bončina "Benč" (of September). In 1976, Škrgatić went to serve his mandatory stint in the Yugoslav army and the group ended their activity.

=== Post breakup ===
Škrgatić made his last discographic appearance in 1979, recording the EP 20 godina ORA Sava (20 Years of Youth Work Action Sava) with the band Stakleno Zvono (Bell Jar), retiring from performing soon after. He wrote articles on music for the magazines Plavi vjesnik (Blue Messenger), Studio and Tina. His photographs were published in numerous magazines and books. He wrote satirical fairy tales for the Kvarner Radio and the magazine Vinodolski zbornik (Vinodol Collection). He died on 28 September 2014. His daughter Mirna performed in the band Putokazi, and continued her musical career as a singer-songwriter.

In 2023, the Dutch record label Everland Music Group released the compilation album Dawn of the Yugoslavian Prog-Rock Era (Unreleased Radio Recordings 1970–1976). The album was released on vinyl and featured the band's previously unreleased recordings made in Radio Television Zagreb studio R4, as well as Zagreb studios Iskra and Lisinski.

== Discography ==
=== Compilation albums ===
- Dawn of the Yugoslavian Prog-Rock Era (Unreleased Radio Recordings 1970–1976) (2023)

=== Singles ===
- "Beži Janke" / "Vjeruj" (1973)
- "Rokoko" / "Čežnja" (1974)
- "Tina" / "Budi tu" (1974)

=== Other appearances ===
- "Smij se" (Pop Festival Ljubljana 72, 1972)
