= Odpotovanja =

Studio album by Tomaž Pengov
- Released: 1973
- Recorded: 1973
- Genre: Folk rock
- Label: Škuc
- Producer: Janez Krall

Tomaž Pengov chronology
| Odpotovanja (1973) | Pripovedi (1988) |

Odpotovanja is the first studio album by Slovene musician Tomaž Pengov. It was recorded in 1973 and released on vinyl. This album is considered to be the first independently released record in former Yugoslavia. It was reissued in 1981 in stereo; the original mono edition is very rare now.

== Track listing ==
All songs written by Tomaž Pengov.

Side one

1. "Cesta" – 4:17
2. "Danaja" – 3:15
3. "V Nasmehu Nekega Dneva" – 3:50
4. "Potovanje nespečih" – 3:34
5. "Matala" – 2:20
6. "Čakajoč nase, brat" – 4:20
7. "Narodna Pesem" – 3:00
8. "Kretnje" – 3:10

Side two

1. "Druga jesen" – 3:45
2. "Oče" – 7:25
3. "Sarkofagi" – 4:37
4. "Ladje prostora" – 7:57
5. "Epistola" – 5:30

== Personnel ==
- Tomaž Pengov – accoutic guitar, 12 string lute, vocals
- Milan Dekleva – liner notes, guest performer
- Bogdana Herman – female vocals
- Aleksander Zorn – guest performer
- Andrej Zdravič – guest performer
- Jurij Detiček – guest performer
- Matjaž Zajec – guest performer
- Metka Zupančič – guest performer
- Tone Koštomaj – guest performer
- Janez Brecelj – photography
- Janez Krall – producer
- Aco Razbornik – recorder
- Matjaž Vipotnik – design
