= Heda Piliš =

Heda Piliš (3 June 1925 - 29 May 2015) was a Croatian pop music arranger, composer and singer who worked for Radio Zagreb for four decades. Her compositions were recorded commercially and she worked with many popular singers.

Piliš was born in Osijek, (then in Yugoslavia; today in Croatia), to Elvira Vogel and Aleksandar Piliš, a banker and Jewish activist. The family moved to Zagreb, where Piliš’ education was interrupted in 1941 when they moved again to Crikvenica, then were placed in internment camps in Kraljevica and Rab (at that time under Italian control) until 1943. That year, Piliš became a youth music director and singer in the Central Theatre Company in the liberated territory of Italy. At the June 1944 Congress of Cultural Workers of Croatia, she performed as a solo singer accompanied by Miroslave Luncera on piano.

When World War II ended in 1945, Piliš returned to Zagreb, where she finished high school and studied voice at the Vatroslav Lisinski Music School. In 1949, she began working as a music editor at Radio Zagreb, where she stayed until retiring in 1990.

Piliš wrote piano and orchestral accompaniments, as well as lyrics for singers such as Gabi Novak, Ivo Robic, Dimij Stanic, Vera Svobada, and Anica Zubovic. From 1960 to 1982, she produced volunteer concerts in Zagreb of popular, classical, and children’s music. Her compositions were commercially recorded by Jugoton on EPY 4369, LPV S 61135, LPV V S 60902 and LPY V S 60979. Her compositions, all songs, included:

- Echo
- I’ll Marry You
- Kokotiček
- Mary
- Merry Vocals
- My Granny
- Našalila Se Kiša
- Novo Kolo
- Our Pussy Cat
- Susret Na Plesu
- Tvoje So Roke Mama
- V Jeden Den
- Vrtuljak
