= Hobo (band) =

Background information
- Origin: Zagreb, SR Croatia, SFR Yugoslavia
- Genres: Progressive rock; jazz rock
- Years active: 1972–1977
- Labels: Jugoton
- Past members: Mato Došen; Saša Cavrić; Josip Belamarić; Boris Trubić; Mladen Garašić

Hobo was a Yugoslav progressive rock band formed in Zagreb in 1972. Formed and led by keyboardist Mato Došen, Hobo was a prominent act of the 1970s Yugoslav rock scene.

== Band history ==
=== 1972–1977 ===
Hobo was formed in 1972 by keyboardist Mato Došen, a former member of the band Heart of Soul. Hobo's lineup featured, beside Došen, Saša Cavrić (bass guitar), Josip Belamarić (electric violin), Boris Trubić (percussion, vocals) and Mladen Garašić (drums).

In 1974, the band performed on the third edition of the BOOM Festival, held in Tivoli Hall in Ljubljana, the recording of their song "Možda jednom" ("Maybe Once") appearing on the double live album Boom Pop Festival Ljubljana '74. In 1975, the band released their debut, self-titled album. In 1975, the band also wrote music for Nenad Puhovski's TV film Bog igre (God of Dance) and performed as the opening band on Deep Purple concert in Zagreb. During the year, Došen took part in the Rock Fest '75, the gathering of the most popular Yugoslav singers of the time; besides Došen, the event featured Željko Bebek (of Bijelo Dugme), Marin Škrgatić (of Grupa Marina Škrgatića), Aki Rahimovski (of Parni Valjak), Seid Memić "Vajta" (of Teška Industrija), Boris Aranđelović (of Smak), Hrvoje Marjanović (of Grupa 220), Dado Topić (of Time) and Janez Bončina "Benč" (of September).

In 1976, Hobo issued their second and last release, the 7-inch single with the songs "Žena" ("Woman") and "Ha-De-Ho". Disappointed with the lack of commercial success, Došen decided to disband Hobo in 1977.

=== Post breakup ===
After Hobo disbanded, Došen formed the band Izazov, which performed more commercial rock music, leaving the band in 1979. In 1982, he released his only solo album, Zabranjene žene (Forbidden Women), after which he dedicated himself to composing and album production. During his career he produced albums by Arsen Dedić, Mišo Kovač, Marina Perazić, Neda Ukraden, Vladimir Savčić "Čobi", Danijel Popović, Massimo Savić, Magazin and other acts. He recorded the duet "Sve je plavo" ("Everything Is Blue") with Ljiljana Nikolovska and the duet "Samo je nebo iznad nas" ("Above Us Only Sky") with Neda Ukraden. In 1985, he composed music for the children's music album Palčica (Thumbelina), based on the Hans Christian Andersen's fairy tale of the same title. He graduated from the Zagreb Music Academy and from the Department of sociology of the Zagreb Faculty of Humanities and Social Sciences. In 1988, he moved to Spain, where he started a recording studio and a night club, continuing to compose and produce albums by various artists. He moved back to Zagreb in 2008, where he continued to work as a producer. He died of heart attack on 2 April 2010.

Saša Cavrić died in 1980.

== Discography ==
=== Studio albums ===
- Hobo (1975)

=== Singles ===
- "Žena" / "Ha-De-Ho" (1976)

=== Other appearances ===
- "Možda jednom" (Boom Pop Festival Ljubljana '74; 1974)
