= Kaleš bre Anǵo =

Kaleš bre Angjo (Macedonian: Калеш бре Анѓо) is a Macedonian patriotic folk song dating from the times of the Ottoman Empire.

== Structure ==
It is often performed by a male / female duet, but not necessarily. It is structured in a form of a dialogue. It has four verses of which the first three are performed by the male vocalist (in case of a duet).

== Performances and recordings ==
It has been performed and recorded by many popular folk singers from North Macedonia, the former Yugoslavia and the whole Balkan region. Pop, rock, jazz, and even classical cover versions also exist (incl. versions by Esma Redžepova, Goran Bregović, Delfini, Azra, Laza Ristovski, Toše Proeski and numerous others).

== Soundtracks ==
The song was used for the movies: Emir Kusturica's Arizona Dream and Borat! Cultural Learnings of America for Make Benefit Glorious Nation of Kazakhstan, although it has no connection to the music of Kazakhstan. The song is not included on the soundtrack CD for this movie.

== Explanation of the lyrics ==
The lyrics are in Macedonian with some archaisms and Turkish loanwords.

It is a story about an Ottoman Turkish man playing and singing a serenade with tambura to a young dark-haired (kalesh) Macedonian girl named Angja (Анѓа). He asks her to become his wife and he promises her a rich and easy life with lots of gold (жолтици, žoltici) and pearls (бисери, biseri) only if she would change her nationality and religion and become an anama (Анама да бидиш, Anama da bidiš), in Turkish: Hanim, to be his obedient Ottoman Turkish and muslim wife in his harem
At the end of the song the girl proudly refuses his offers saying that she would never become an anama (анама не бивам, anama ne bivam). She would never sacrifice her freedom, nationality and faith for the gifts he offers.

== Lyrics ==
In Macedonian, Macedonian alphabet.

Ајде слушај, слушај, калеш бре Анѓо,
што тамбура свири.
Тамбурата свири, калеш бре Анѓо,
анама да бидиш.

Анама да бидиш, калеш бре Анѓо,
на чардак да седиш.
На чардак да седиш, калеш бре Анѓо,
жолтици да броиш.

Жолтици да броиш, калеш бре Анѓо,
бисери да нижиш.
Бисери да нижиш, калеш бре Анѓо,
на грло да редиш.

Ајде, слушај, слушај клето бре Турче,
анама не бивам.
Анама не бивам, клето бре Турче,
турски не разбирам.

== The real Kaleš Angja ==
The oral tradition in North Macedonia says that the song was based on true historical events in the region of Mariovo: After failing to seduce her with his power and fortune, the furious man wanted to abduct her and to force her into islamization. Refusing to accept this Kaleš Angja committed suicide by jumping off a cliff.

== The book ==
Inspired by this story, the Macedonian writer Stale Popov wrote the book Kaleš Angja in 1958.

== Audio samples ==
- Version by the Macedonian folk singer Violeta Tomovska
- Version by the Macedonian pop singer Toše Proeski

== Video ==
- Live ethno-jazz performance by the band KUD MEYA from Croatia

== See also ==
- Music of North Macedonia
- North Macedonia
