= Pripovedi =

Studio album by Tomaž Pengov
- Released: 1988
- Recorded: 1980–1988
- Genre: Folk rock
- Label: ZKP RTVL
- Producer: Tomaž Pengov

Tomaž Pengov chronology
Odpotovanja (1973)	Pripovedi (1988)	Rimska cesta (1992)

Pripovedi is the second studio album by Slovene musician Tomaž Pengov. He took eight years, from 1980 to 1988, to record this album, recorded with guest musicians. The music is still acoustic, but more varied.

== Track listing ==
All songs written by Tomaž Pengov.

=== Side one ===
1. "Rodovnik vina" – 4:10
2. "Prišla je" – 3:25
3. "Pegam in Lambergar" – 6:10
4. "Starec in morska zvezda" – 4:10

=== Side two ===
1. "Vanitas" – 3:05
2. "Vrnitev" – 3:45
3. "Tihe so njive" – 3:18
4. "Dolga reka" – 4:30
5. "Bela izba" – 4:18

== Personnel ==
- Tomaž Pengov – accoutic guitar, 12-string lute, vocals
- Matjaž Sekne - viola
- Emil Krečan - horns
- Lado Jakša - piano, organ, saxophone, flute, clarinet
- Bogdana Herman - female vocals
- Matevž Smerkol - bass, double bass
- Aleš Rendla - drums, tam tam, maracas
- Meta Arnold - flute
- Igor Leonardi - oug, bongos
- Drago Golob - oboe
- Jerko Novak - guitar
- Stanko Arnold - trumpet
- Matjaž Vipotnik - artwork
- Aco Razbornik - recorder
