= Goce Nikolovski =

Yugoslav and North Macedonian singer (1947–2006)

- Born: 1947; Skopje, Macedonia, Yugoslavia (now Skopje, North Macedonia)
- Died: 16 December 2006 (aged 58–59) Skopje, Macedonia
- Genres: Rock; pop; folk
- Occupations: Musician; singer
- Formerly of: Daltoni

Goce Nikolovski (Macedonian: Гоце Николовски; 1947 – 16 December 2006) was a Macedonian singer. Starting his musical career as the vocalist for the Yugoslav rock band Daltoni from Niš, Nikolovski started his solo career in early 1970s. He reached the peak of popularity in 1990 with his hit song "Biser Balkanski" (English: "Pearl of the Balkans").

== Musical career ==
Nikolovski was born in Skopje, Yugoslavia (now in North Macedonia) in 1947. During late 1960s and early 1970s he was the frontman of the Niš-based Yugoslav rock band Daltoni, starting his solo career after the dissolution of the group. His popularity peaked in 1990, when his song "Biser Balkanski" won first place at the Folk Fest Valandovo 1990, an annual competition for singers from the former Yugoslavia. The song became an instant hit in Macedonia, even becoming somewhat of an anthem to a nation just starting off after its breakup from Yugoslavia. Nikolovski was also given the nickname "Biser Balkanski" following the song.

Throughout the 1990s, Nikolovski went on to release several other hits, but none would measure up to the success that he found with "Biser Balkanski". In 1992, Nikolovski took part in the Canberra '92 Festival, a concert similar to the annual Valandovo song festival, with the song "Od majka nema pomila" ("No One Is Dearer than Mother").

Nikolovski's popularity declined as time progressed, and by the start of the 21st century, he had virtually disappeared from the public eye.

== Death ==
On 16 December 2006, Nikolovski's neighbours heard a gunshot coming from the home of the singer at around 10:00 pm local time. At around 3:00 am the following morning, police arrived at Nikolovski's house which was locked from the inside and found the 59-year-old singer dead in his home. He had committed suicide with a gunshot to the head. It has since been confirmed that Nikolovski was alone at the time. His gun was found nearby, as well as a suicide note that was written to his family.
