= Zlatni Prsti (album) =

Studio album by Zlatni Prsti
- Released: 1976
- Genre: Rock
- Label: PGP-RTB
- Producer: Zlatni Prsti

Zlatni Prsti chronology
Zlatni Prsti (1976)	Nokaut! (1979)

Zlatni Prsti (trans. The Golden Fingers) is the eponymous debut studio album by Yugoslav rock band Zlatni Prsti. It was issued in 1976 by PGP-RTB.

== Track listing ==
Side A
No.	Title	Writer(s)	Length
1.	"Želim" ("I Want")	Momčilo Radenković
2.	"Imam pravo na to" ("I Have a Right to It")	Momčilo Radenković
3.	"Dođi u život moj" ("Come to My Life")	Dragan Batalo
4.	"Draga" ("Darling")	Momčilo Radenković
5.	"Čokolada" ("Chocolate")	Momčilo Radenković

Side B
No.	Title	Writer(s)	Length
1.	"Nemam snage" ("I Don't Have the Strength")	Momčilo Radenković
2.	"Pevam ti poslednji put" ("I Sing to You for the Last Time")	Momčilo Radenković
3.	"Priče o meni" ("Stories about Me")	Dragan Batalo
4.	"Ti nikad nećeš znati" ("You'll Never Know")	Dragan Batalo
5.	"Pevajmo ljubavi" ("Let Us Sing to Love")	Momčilo Radenković

== Personnel ==
- Momčilo Radenković – guitar, vocals
- Dragan Batalo – keyboards
- Slobodan Radenković – bass
- Dragan Trajković – drums, percussion

=== Additional personnel ===
- Dragan Vukićević - sound engineer
- Tahir Durkalić - sound engineer
- Aca Portnoj - cover, design

== Sources ==
- Zlatni Prsti at Discogs
- Zlatni Prsti at Rate Your Music
