= Rimska cesta =

Studio album by Tomaž Pengov
- Released: 1992
- Recorded: 1992
- Genre: Folk rock
- Label: Sraka
- Producer: Tomaž Pengov

Tomaž Pengov chronology
Pripovedi (1988)	Rimska cesta (1992)	Biti tu (1996)

Rimska cesta is the third studio album by Slovene musician Tomaž Pengov.

== Track listing ==
All songs written by Tomaž Pengov.

Side one

1. "Na daljnem kolodvoru" – 3:31
2. "Vandrovček" – 3:31
3. "Generali" – 4:34
4. "Kamor greš..." – 4:12
5. "Bila sva vse" – 3:48
6. "V nasmehu nekega dneva" – 4:12
7. "Ladje konkvistadorjev" – 4:31
8. "Stari klovni" – 3:45
9. "Kam" – 2:27
10. "Ostani lepa" – 3:16
11. "Črna pega" – 3:02
12. "Vrtna vrata" – 3:39
13. "Obrazi padajo" – 2:33

== Personnel ==
- Tomaž Pengov - guitar, 12-string lute, vocal, producer
- Lado Jakša - photography, design
- Borut Činč - recorder
