= Žeteoci =

Croatian band

Background information
- Also known as: Bijeli Kolari
- Origin: Zagreb, SR Croatia, SFR Yugoslavia
- Genres: Beat music; Christian rock; Christian pop; folk rock
- Years active: 1966–1971 (Reunions: 2007)
- Labels: Glas Koncila, Jugoton
- Past members: Mijo Bergovec; Mato Dukić; Mijo Gabrić; Josip Pustički; Valent Bogadi

Žeteoci (trans. The Harvesters) were a Yugoslav rock band formed in Zagreb in 1966. Founded by four students of the Zagreb Catholic Faculty of Theology, Žeteoci performed beat music with religious lyrics, being the first Christian rock band in Yugoslavia, arguably the first Christian rock band in a communist country and one of the first Christian rock bands in general. In addition, Žeteoci, as other 1960s rock bands from Yugoslavia—although they were not among the earliest Yugoslav rock groups—played a pioneering roll on the Yugoslav rock scene. Their first and only album To nije tajna, released in 1969, was the second full-length album in the history of Yugoslav rock music.

Although an openly religious band in a communist state, due to specific political and cultural milieu of the Non-Aligned Yugoslavia, for the most of their career Žeteoci enjoyed the attention of the media and notable popularity among the Yugoslav youth. Their only album was released in cooperation between Glas Koncila, the official newspaper of the Catholic Church in Croatia, and state-owned record label Jugoton. They ended their activity in 1971, as the members of the band finished their studies of theology and went on to become priests of the Catholic Church. They have made only one brief reunion, in 2007.

== History ==
=== 1966–1971 ===
The band was formed in the autumn of 1966 by Mijo Bergovec, Mato Dukić, Mijo Gabrić and Josip Pustički and was initially named Bijeli Kolari (White Wheelwrights, "White" in the band's name coming from custom of Yugoslav 1960s bands to include a color in their name; popular Yugoslav bands of the era included Bijele Strijele, Crni Biseri and Crveni Koralji). At the time of the formation, all four members were students of the Zagreb Catholic Faculty of Theology. They were encouraged to take up guitar by their confessor Josip Salač, during their staying at the convent on the island of Čiovo in the summer of 1966.

Initially, they performed only among their professors and fellow students, with Dukić singing and other three playing guitars. Fearing the reaction of the church circles to theology students performing popular music, the four opened their first performance by quoting Matthew 11:16-17: "We played the pipe for you, and you did not dance; we sang a dirge, and you did not mourn". They had their first public appearance in 1967, when they appeared in Television Belgrade show Koncert za ludi mladi svet (A Concert for Young Crazy World).

By 1968, the band had acquired all the necessary equipment, with their first electric guitar being a gift from Cardinal Franjo Šeper, and started performing in the following lineup: Mijo Bergovec (vocals, guitar, organ), Mato Dukić (vocals, bass guitar), Mijo Gabrić (drums), with a new member, Valent Bogadi (guitar). This lineup had their first public performance on 3 February 1969, in the Iskra Hall in Zagreb. The band performed beat music with religious lyrics, so the Yugoslav press nicknamed them "električari u haljama" ("electric musicians in robes"). Their repertoire also included compositions by French singer-songwriter and Jesuit Aimé Duval, in their own arrangements and with Serbo-Croatian lyrics, as well as other spiritual songs. The group also self-published the song book Muzika ljudske duše (Music of the Human Soul), sold on their concerts.

Soon after the performance in the Iskra Hall, due to large interest of the public, Žeteoci scheduled a performance in Zagreb's Students' Cultural Center. However, the performance was banned by the communist authorities just before the beginning of the concert, which caused the dissatisfaction of the gathered crowd, which in turn forced the police to react. A week later, the band was allowed to hold a concert, but after the event they performed mostly abroad. During the following years the band held a number of concerts across Austria, Italy, Switzerland, United States of America and Canada. On their concerts abroad they performed, besides their religious songs, covers of traditional songs from Yugoslavia and current pop hits. On one occasion, they were invited by Cardinal Šeper to perform in Archbishop's Palace in Zagreb during the visit of Bishop of Hamburg Hans-Otto Wölber and Apostolic Delegate to Yugoslavia Mario Cagna.

At the beginning of 1969, the band released their only studio album, entitled To nije tajna (It Is Not a Secret). To nije tajna was released only two months after the first full-length album in the history of Yugoslav rock music, Naši dani (Our Days) by Grupa 220, thus becoming the second full-length album in Yugoslav rock history. The album, produced by Pero Gotovac, was released by Glas Koncila (Voice of the Council), the official newspaper of the Catholic Church in Croatia, and printed by the state-owned record label Jugoton. It featured rock sound as well as pop and gospel songs. The album was sold in churches, with the initial number of 10,000 copies sold out until the end of the year. It was reissued two more times in the following years, with different album covers, thus becoming both the best-selling record of religious music in Yugoslavia and a collector's item. The album saw positive reviews in the Yugoslav music press. In 1970, the band made another appearance in the Koncert za mladi ludi svet TV show, performing the song "Rumeno nebo" ("Rosy Sky"), originally written by Aimé Duval.

Two years after the album release, the band released the 7-inch single with the songs "Majka Marija" ("Mother Mary") and "Bistrička" ("Bistrica Song"), for which the music was composed by renowned singer-songwriter Arsen Dedić. Soon after, as the members of the band had completed their studies, they decided to disband in order to become priests, having their last concert in Dubrovnik in 1971.

=== Post breakup ===
After Žeteoci ended their activity, all the members of the band became catholic priests, with the exception of Bergovac, who quit his studies of theology in the fifth year of the Faculty. He graduated from the Zagreb School of Medicine, later becoming a cardiac surgeon. He continued his musical activities as a member of the octet Goranin and of the Mixed Choir of Saint Joseph Parish, and as the leader of the amateur choir Zagrebački Lječnici Pjevači (Zagreb Physician Singers). Valent Bogati was a parish priest in Grubišno Polje, and from 1982 to 2001 worked in a parish in Toronto. After his return from Canada, he became a parish priest in Varaždinske Toplice. He died on 2 January 2009. Mato Dukić was a parish priest in Velika Pisanica, and later became religious education teacher in Zagreb. Mijo Gabrić was an editor in Glas koncila and in the catholic newspaper for children Mali koncil (Little Council). He was the dean of Chapter of Prebendaries of the Zagreb Church, but was removed from the position after a corruption scandal.

The band's only studio album was reissued in 1978 by the Swedish label Credo. The band's song "Tmina" ("Darkness") was published on the box set Kad je rock bio mlad – Priče sa istočne strane (1956–1970) (When Rock Was Young – East Side Stories (1956–1970)), released by Croatia Records in 2005 and featuring songs by the pioneering Yugoslav rock acts. In 2009, Croatia Records reissued To nije tajna, with the songs from the band's only 7-inch single as bonus tracks.

=== 2007 reunion ===
Žeteoci made a one-off reunion on 29 April 2007, when they appeared at the Festival of New Spiritual Music in Varaždin as festival's special guests. For the occasion, they performed the song "To nije tajna".

== Discography ==
=== Studio albums ===
- To nije tajna (1969)

=== Singles ===
- "Majka Marija" / "Bistrička" (1971)
