= Atomi =

Yugoslav rock band

Background information
- Origin: Zagreb, SR Croatia, SFR Yugoslavia
- Genres: Instrumental rock
- Years active: 1961–1963 (Reunions: 2006)
- Label: Jugoton
- Past members: Darko Brozović; Miroslav Wolfhart; Mišo Zozlik; Josip Dajčman; Ninoslav Kožul

Atomi (trans. The Atoms) were a Yugoslav rock band formed in Zagreb in 1961. They were one of the pioneers of the Yugoslav rock scene.

Heavily influenced by The Shadows, Atomi were arguably the first instrumental rock band formed in Yugoslavia. The band gained local popularity, which gave them an opportunity to become the first rock band to make recordings for Radio Zagreb and the first Yugoslav rock band to appear on television. The group disbanded in 1963, making a one-off reunion 43 years later for a performance in Zagreb.

== History ==
=== 1961–1964 ===
Atomi were formed in Zagreb at the end of 1961 by Darko Brozović (guitar), Miroslav "Miro" Wolfhart (guitar) and Mišo "Zozoli" Zozlik (bass guitar). The band constructed their instruments and amplifiers themselves, with the help of technician Ninoslav Kožul, who was considered an official member of the group. After they made their first amateur recordings, they were joined by drummer Josip "Pepi" Dajčman and started to perform live, holding their first live performance on 2 October 1962. Heavily influenced by The Shadows, Atomi are considered the first instrumental rock band to be formed in SR Croatia, and perhaps in Yugoslavia.

Atomi gained local popularity, which provided them with an opportunity to hold regular performances in the Zagreb club Neboder (Skyscraper). Their performances got them the attention of the media, so they were invited to make recordings for Radio Zagreb, becoming the first rock band to make recordings for that radio station. For Radio Zagreb they recorded the songs "Sedam dana oko vatre" ("Seven Days around the Fire"), "Johnny Will" (a cover of Pat Boone song) and "Zlatna ulica" ("Golden Street", a cover of The Shadows song "Find Me a Golden Street"). These recordings increased their popularity in Croatia. In October 1962, in the Istra concert hall, the band made recordings for the Television Zagreb children's show Slavica i Mendo, becoming the first Yugoslav rock band to appear on television.

In 1963, the band released their only solo record, a 7" single with the songs "Driftin' (U zanosu)", a cover of The Shadows song "Driftin'", and "Golden Earrings (Zlante naušnice)", a cover of Les Fantômes song "Golden Earrings". Later that year the band released the EP Juri Gagarin (Yuri Gagarin) with the vocal quartet Problem. The EP featured the songs "Juri Gagarin" (a cover of Luciano Beretta song "Yuri Gagarin"), "Havajski tvist (Hawaiian Twist)" (a cover of The Chakachas song "Hawaiian War Twist"), "Twist na ulici" ("Twist in the Street") and "Čarobni trenuci (Sweet Moments)". The band also recorded music for the single "Kralj pajaca" / "Moj rodni kraj" ("King of Clowns" / "My Home") by singer Zdenka Vučković.

In 1963, Atomi decided to end their activity, as the members of the band were drafted to serve their mandatory stints in the Yugoslav People's Army. The band held their farewell concert in Zagreb dance club Variete on 18 March 1963.

=== Post breakup, 2006 reunion ===
In 2001, Atomi songs "Zlatna ulica" and "Zlatne naušnice" appeared on the compilation album Zlatne godine, featuring recordings by Yugoslav 1960s rock bands. In 2005, their songs "Driftin' (U zanosu)", "Johnny Will", "Sedam dana oko vatre", "Zlatna ulica", "Golden Earrings (Zlatne naušnice)", "Plava zvijezda (Blue Star)" and "Besame Mucho" appeared on the box set Kad je rock bio mlad – Priče sa istočne strane (1956–1970) (When Rock Was Young – East Side Stories (1956–1970)), released by Croatia Records in 2005 and featuring songs by the pioneering Yugoslav rock acts.

Ninoslav Kožul died in 2004. In 2006, Darko Brozović, Miroslav "Miro" Wolfhart and Mišo "Zozoli" Zozlik reunited for a concert in Zagreb's Bogaloo club, organized in order to mark Radio Zagreb's 80th anniversary and Television Zagreb's 50th anniversary. On the concert, Atomi performed with drummer Salih Sadiković, playing the songs "Driftin' (U zanosu)" and "Sedam dana oko vatre".

== Discography ==
=== EPs ===
- Juri Gagarin (with Problem; 1963)

=== Singles ===
- "Driftin' (U zanosu)" / "Golden Earrings (Zlatne naušnice)" (1963)
