= Nokaut! =

Studio album by Zlatni Prsti
- Released: 1979
- Genre: Rock
- Label: PGP-RTB
- Producer: Ljubomir Sedlar

Zlatni Prsti chronology
| Zlatni Prsti (1976) | Nokaut! (1979) |

Nokaut! (trans. Knockout) is the second and the laste studio album by Yugoslav rock band Zlatni Prsti, released in 1979. Soon after the album was released, the band decided to adopt Nokaut as their new name.

== Track listing ==
All lyrics are written by Mirko Glišić; all music is composed by Momčilo Radenković, except where noted

Side A
| No. | Title | Length |
|---|---|---|
| 1. | "Nokaut" ("Knockout") | 4:17 |
| 2. | "Noć već bledi, blizu je dan" ("The Night Fades, the Day Is Close") | 5:40 |
| 3. | "Tužni diplomac" ("Sad Graduate") | 4:40 |
| 4. | "Ah, taj glupi bar" ("Ah, That Stupid Bar") | 4:35 |

Side B
| No. | Title | Music | Length |
|---|---|---|---|
| 1. | "Žuti taksi" ("Yellow Taxi") | | 4:06 |
| 2. | "Beli breg" ("White Hill") | Jovan Nikolić | 5:50 |
| 3. | "Hladna kao led" ("Cold as Ice") | | 4:11 |
| 4. | "Zbogom, mila moja" ("Goodbye, My Dear") | | 6:33 |

== Personnel ==
- Momčilo Radenković – vocals, guitar
- Dušan Maslać – keyboards
- Jovan Nikolić – bass
- Dragan Trajković – drums, percussion

=== Additional personnel ===
- Ljubomir Sedlar – producer
- Slobodan Purić – photography
- Zoran Tišma – photography
