= Zlatni Prsti =

Yugoslav rock band

Background information
- Also known as: Nokaut
- Origin: Zaječar, SR Serbia, SFR Yugoslavia
- Genres: Rock
- Years active: 1970–1981 (reunions: 2012, 2016)
- Labels: PGP-RTB, Diskos, Jugoton, Raglas Records, PGP-RTS
- Past members: Momčilo Radenković; Slobodan Radenković; Dragan Batalo; Dragan Trajković; Jovan Rašić; Dušan Maslać; Jovan Nikolić

Zlatni Prsti (Serbian Cyrillic: Златни Прсти, trans. The Golden Fingers) were a Yugoslav rock band formed in Zaječar in 1970.

Formed and led by guitarist and vocalist Momčilo Radenković, Zlatni Prsti were a prominent act of the Yugoslav rock scene in the 1970s. In the late 1970s, with the emergence of Yugoslav new wave scne, the band changed their name to Nokaut (Serbian Cyrillic: Нокаут, trans. Knockout) and made a slight turn towards new wave sound, but failed to maintain their popularity and disbanded at the beginning of the 1980s. The band made two one-off reunions, in 2012 and 2016.

== Band history ==
=== 1970 – 1981 ===
The band was formed in 1970 by brothers Momčilo (guitar) and Slobodan Radenković (bass guitar), Dragan Batalo (keyboards) and Dragan Trajković (drums). The band's first vocalist was Jovan Rašić. After he moved to Generacija 5, the singing duties were taken over by Momčilo Radenković. The band gained the public's attention after winning the first place at the Zaječar Gitarijada Festival in 1974, after which they appeared on a various artists record published by Radio Belgrade show Veče uz radio (Evening by the Radio) with the song "Naša pesma" ("Our Song"). During the same year, the band appeared on the Subotica Youth Festival, with the song "Pevam ti poslednji put" ("I Sing to You for the Last Time"), which was published on various artists live album Gde je ljubav: Omladina '74 (Where Is Love: Youth Festival '74) recorded on the festival. In 1975, the band appeared on the same festival with the song "Budi hrabra".

In 1976, the band released their debut self-titled album through PGP-RTB record label. The recording of the album lasted only eighteen hours. Most of the songs on the album were composed by Momčilo Radenković, while the lyrics were written by lyricist Mirko Glišić. After the album was released, the band, dissatisfied with the deal they had with PGP-RTB, signed with Diskos, releasing a 7-inch single with the songs "Reših da se ženim" ("I Decided to Get Married") and "Posebna si uvek bila" ("You Were Always Special") through the label. After that, they signed for Jugoton, releasing the single with the songs "Igraj rege" ("Dance to Reggae") and "Prsti od plastike" ("Plastic Fingers") in 1977, "Igraj rege" becoming the band's first nationwide hit. In 1977, the band appeared on the double various artists live album Pop parada 1 (Pop Parade 1), recorded in Pinki Hall in Belgrade, alongside Zdravo, Pop Mašina, Drugi Način, Parni Valjak, Time and other acts, with the songs "Pevajmo ljubavi" ("Lets Sing to Love") and "Posebna si uvek bila". During the same year, the band also appeared on the various artists album Brigadirska pesma (Brigadiers' Song), recorded for the needs of youth work actions, with the song "Ne mogu sam da budem brigada" ("I Can't Be a Brigade just by Myself"). During the same year, the band performed on the sixth BOOM Festival, alongside Cvrčak i Mravi, Leb i Sol, Tako, Suncokret, Zebra, Buldožer, Tomaž Domicelj, Parni Valjak, Smak, Vatreni Poljubac and other acts.

In 1979, the band released their second studio album, entitled Nokaut!. Soon after the album was released, they decided to adopt Nokaut as their new name. With the new name came changes in the lineup: Batalo had to leave the band due to his mandatory stint in the Yugoslav People's Army, and was replaced by Dušan Maslać, a former member of the band Prava Stvar (Real Deal), and Slobodan Radenković left the band to dedicate himself to his pizzeria, and was replaced by Jovan Nikolić.

At the beginning of the 1980s, at the time of the popularity of new wave bands, the band saw a decline of popularity. They tried to keep up with younger acts with new wave-influenced songs published on 7-inch singles, but only their ballads saw moderate success, mostly thanks to Momčilo Radenković's raspy voice. Soon, the band ended their activity.

=== Post breakup ===
In the late 1980s, Momčilo Radenković, Batalo and Trajković played on two albums by folk singer Boban Zdravković, Klinka (Little Girl, 1988) and Praštam ti, dušo (I Forgive You, My Darling, 1989), and the albums were released under the Boban Zdravković & Zlatni Prsti moniker. Radenković wrote songs for a number of Serbian folk singers. He worked as a sound engineer at Radio Zaječar, during the 1990s he was the president of the Serbian Renewal Movement Zaječar branch, and for a certain time was the president of the Association of Entrepreneurs of Zaječar.

In 1999, Raglas Records released the compilation album Zlatna kolekcija (Golden Collection), for which some of the songs were rerecorded by Momčilo Radenković. In 2007, PGP-RTS released the band's both studio albums on one CD, entitled Zlatni Prsti & Nokaut.

=== 2012 and 2016 reunions, post reunions ===
In 2012, a documentary about the band, directed by Marko Grujić and entitled Tačno u centar (Bullseye), was released. The band reunited to perform at the premiere of the film.

In 2016 Momčilo Radenković reunited the band in order to perform on the 50th edition of Zaječar Gitarijada Festival. The band opened the festival with their performance on August 11.

Momčilo Radenković died in Zaječar on 20 April 2021 after long illness. He was 70 years old.

== Discography ==
=== Studio albums ===
- Zlatni Prsti (1976)
- Nokaut! (1979)

=== Compilations ===
- Zlatna kolekcija (1999)
- Zlatni Prsti & Nokaut (2007)

=== Singles ===
- "Budi hrabra" / "Voli me ljubavi" (1975)
- "Reših da se ženim" / "Posebna si uvek bila" (1977)
- "Igraj rege" / "Prsti od plastike" (1977)
- "Kako da osvojim tebe" / "Istina" (1978)
- "Super finale" / "Ima nešto u tebi što nikom poklonio ne bih" (1979)
- "Žuti taxi" / "Noć već bledi, blizu je dan" (as Nokaut, 1980)
- "Igraj bugi vugi" / "Kad nemaš gde da odeš" (as Nokaut, 1981)

=== Other appearances ===
- "Pevam ti poslednji put" (Gde je ljubav: Omladina '74, 1974)
- "Posebna si uvek bila" / "Pevajmo ljubavi" (Pop parada 1, 1977)
- "Ne mogu sam da budem brigada" (Brigadirska pesma, 1977)
