= Drago Mlinarec (musician) =

Croatian rock musician (born 1942)

- Born: 14 December 1942 (age 83); Zagreb, Independent State of Croatia
- Origin: Zagreb, Croatia
- Genres: Rock, pop
- Occupations: Musician, singer, songwriter
- Instruments: Vocals, guitar, harmonica
- Years active: 1962–present
- Labels: Jugoton, Suzy Records, Croatia Records

Drago Mlinarec (born 14 December 1942) is a Croatian rock musician who became known in the former Yugoslavia with popular progressive rock band Grupa 220.

== Life ==
Mlinarec was born and grew up in Zagreb, the capital of Croatia. During his formative years, Yugoslavia was under Tito's form of socialism though it had open borders with the West. He has stated that his lyrics were inspired, at least in part, by the Noir films he had seen at the cinema.

== Work ==
Besides playing in one of the most popular rock bands in Yugoslavia, Grupa 220, Mlinarec in the 1970s composed music for several theatre plays, TV shows, documentary and feature films. His musical style was compared with Crosby, Stills, Nash & Young. Some of his albums were recorded in Sweden.

=== Musical career ===
After serving his mandatory military service, Mlinarec left Grupa 220 and begun a successful solo career. His 1972 album Pjesme s Planine yielded several notable songs including Noćna Ptica and Skladište Tišine. Arguably his greatest achievement was the 1975 album Rođenje. He used a variety of sounds and his style of play was distinctive - it remains so today. Among his later hits is a Latino hit "Caracas".

== Discography ==
=== Singles and EP's ===
Grupa 220

- "Kad bih bio Petar Pan" (Jugoton 1967)
- "Osmijeh" (Jugoton 1967)
- "Prolazi jesen/Plavi svijet" (Jugoton 1968)
- "Prva ljubav/Povratak" (Jugoton 1971)
- "Sivilo perona/Do viđenja, vještice" (Jugoton 1971)

Solo

- "Noćna ptica/U njegovom srcu" (Jugoton 1972)
- "Caracas/Kule od riječi" (Jugoton 1977)

=== Albums ===
Grupa 220

- Naši dani (Jugoton 1968)
- Originals 67/68 (Jugoton 1987) - kompilacija

Solo

- A ti se ne daj (Jugoton 1971 - LPY-V-S 50926)
- Pjesme s planine (Jugoton 1972 - LPVYS-60995)
- Rođenje (Jugoton 1975 - LSY-63002)
- Negdje postoji netko (Jugoton 1977 - LSY-68037)
- Sve je u redu (Jugoton 1978 - LSY-66057)
- Tako lako (Jugoton 1979 - LSY-66079)
- Sabrano (Jugoton 1980 - LSY-66115) - kompilacija, "remake" ranije snimljenih pjesama
- Pomaknuto (Jugoton 1983 - LSY-63152)
- Analog (FV Založba 1994 – FV 43)
- Krhotine (Croatia Records 1996 - CD D K 5050919) - kompilacija
- Krhotine 2005 (Croatia Records 2005) - compilation
- Collection (Croatia Records 2011 - CD 5936268) - kompilacija (box set)

Grupa 220 and solo

- The Ultimate Collection (Croatia Records 2007) - compilation

== Awards ==
- 1987: The Josip Štolcer Slavenski award from the newspaper Vjesnik
- 1997: The Porin Award for the album Krhotine
- 2005: The Porin Award for lifetime accomplishment in music
