= Biseri =

Yugoslav rock band

- Biseri in 1969

Background information
- Origin: Zagreb, SR Croatia, SFR Yugoslavia
- Genres: Beat music; rhythm and blues; pop rock
- Years active: 1965-1980
- Labels: Jugoton, Suzy
- Past members: Robert Marinčić; Vladimir Kočiš; Boris Bregović; Vladimir Hlady; Milorad Perić; Slavko Pintarić; Ranko Marton; Zoran Antoljak; Željko Kovačević; Čedo Juzbašić; Igor Franulović; Dragutin Horvat; Dubravko Miletić

Biseri (trans. The Pearls) were a Yugoslav rock band formed in Zagreb in 1965.

During the 1960s Biseri performed beat and rhythm and blues. In the 1970s they moved towards pop rock, but failed to achieve larger popularity and disbanded in 1980. Although they were not among the earliest Yugoslav rock bands, Biseri, as other Yugoslav 1960s rock groups, played a pioneering role on the Yugoslav rock scene.

== History ==
=== 1965-1980 ===
Biseri were formed in 1965 by Robert Marinčić (vocals), Vladimir Kočiš "Zec" (guitar, vocals), Boris Bregović (guitar), Vladimir Hlady (bass guitar) and Milorad Perić (drums). Initially the band played beat and rhythm and blues and performed mostly in Zagreb clubs Centar (Center) and Mladost (Youth). Soon after the formation they appeared in the popular TV show Koncert za ludi mladi svet (Concert for Crazy Young World) performing the songs "Pokucaj o drvo" ("Knock on Wood") and "Set My Soul".

In 1969, after numerous lineup changes, a stable lineup was formed, featuring Vladimir Kočiš (guitar, vocals), Vladimir Hlady (bass guitar), Slavko Pintarić (drums) and Ranko Marton (keyboards). During this year, the band released their debut record, a 7-inch single with the songs "Anuška" ("Anoushka") and "Naša ljubav" ("Our Love"). For Radio Zagreb the band recorded the song "Život, to smo mi" ("Life, It's Us"), which became a radio hit, but was never officially released. The band enjoyed local popularity, but failed to achieve nationwide success.

In the 1970s the band turned towards pop-oriented sound. They released three 7-inch singles during the 1970s, but failed to gain larger popularity and disbanded in 1980.

During the group's activity, a large number of musicians passed through the band, including vocalist Zoran Antoljak (formerly of Grešnici and Zlatni Akordi), guitarist Željko Kovačević "Pes" (formerly of Mladi, Delfini and Zlatni Akordi), rhythm guitarist Čedo Juzbašić, bass guitarist Igor Franulović, keyboardist Dragutin Horvat, and others.

=== Post breakup ===
After Biseri disbanded, Kočiš joined Novi Fosili. Pintarić moved to Soul Soul Band, and later to Srebrna Krila.

The song "Anuška" was published on the box set Kad je rock bio mlad - Priče sa istočne strane (1956-1970) (When Rock Was Young - East Side Stories (1956-1970)), released by Croatia Records in 2005 and featuring songs by the pioneering Yugoslav rock acts.

== Discography ==
=== Singles ===
- "Anuška" / "Naša ljubav" (1969)
- "Igra" / "Želim da ti dam" (1970)
- "Vidim te u snu" / "Zbog stare navike" (1974)
- "Sve dok muzika svira" / "Ti si moja mladost" (1975)

=== Other appearances ===
- "Hej mala" (Zagreb '79, 1979)
