= Mladi =

Yugoslav rock band

Background information
- Also known as: The Mladis
- Origin: Zagreb, SR Croatia, SFR Yugoslavia
- Genres: Instrumental rock; beat music; rock
- Years active: 1962–1966; 1969
- Label: Croatia Records
- Past members: Željko Kovačević; Branimir Pečjak; Branislav Živković; Krešimir Radić; Predrag Drezga; Walter Neugebauer; Zlatan Kopajtić; Zdenko Juran; Tomas Krkač; Krešimir Šoštar; Boris Turina

Mladi (trans. The Young Ones) were a Yugoslav rock band formed in Zagreb in 1962, notable for being among the pioneers of the Yugoslav rock scene. Despite having no official releases during their original run, Mladi enjoyed large popularity among the Yugoslav youth, also gaining public attention in West Germany, where they performed under the name The Mladis. The group disbanded in 1966, having one short-lived reunion in 1969. Described as "the best 1960s [Yugoslav] band never to release a record", Mladi had large influence on the subsequent development of the Zagreb music scene.

== History ==
=== 1962–1966: Formation, rise to prominence and disbandment ===
The band was formed Željko Kovačević "Pes" (guitar, vocals), Branimir Pečjak (rhythm guitar), Branislav Živković (organ), Krešimir Radić (bass guitar) and Predrag Drezga (drums). All of the members were seventeen at the time, with the exception of Drezga, who was two years older and had previously been a member of Bijele Strijele. The band was initially named Mladi Tehničari (The Young Technicians). When they appeared in the popular TV show Prvi pljesak (The First Applause), their name was shortened to Mladi, on the idea of TV journalist Viki Glovacki, so the members of the group decided to adopt the new name.

Initially, the group was–as a number of Yugoslav bands of the era–influenced by The Shadows. They had their debut performance in Zagreb club Varijete. In the autumn of 1963, Živković left the group, and was replaced by a former Kristali (The Crystals) member Walter Neugebauer, son of comic book artist Norbert Neugebauer and nephew of comic book artist Walter Neugebauer. During late 1963 and 1964, the band recorded several songs for Radio Zagreb: "Južno od granice" ("South of the Border"), "Naftovod" (a cover of The Chantays instrumental "Pipeline"), "Zvjezdana noć" ("Starry Night", a cover of The Shadows song "Cozy"), and "Tema iz filma Kapetan Leši" ("Theme from Captain Lechi"). The songs achieved large airplay, bringing considerable popularity to the band. During 1964, the band performed at the Vatromet ritma festival and a large open-air concert at Zagreb's Šalata Stadium, the latter featuring eight most popular Yugoslav bands of the time. Following the concert, Mladi recorded three more songs for Radio Zagreb: "Vrati se" ("Come Back"), "Bongo Blues" and "Route 66".

In late 1964, the band toured West Germany under the name The Mladis, in the lineup comprising Kovačević, Pečjak, Radić, Drezga, Neugebauer and vocalist Zlatan Kopajtić. Although not the first Yugoslav rock band to perform in Western Europe, Mladi were the first Yugoslav rock group to have a long tour across a West European country, with some of the venues they performed previously hosting The Rolling Stones, The Kinks and The Searchers. Coming to West Germany with their The Shadows-influenced repertoire, Mladi soon realized that they would have to modernize the set list. They performed covers of popular rock songs, but included their own arrangements and improvisations. Holding eight-hour long performances every evening, in West Berlin they soon gained the reputation of a live attraction, the West German press describing them as "The Red Beatles".

The band returned to Zagreb in mid-1965. The group held a successful concert at Šalata Stadium, had a number of performances and Esplanada hotel terrace, and underwent a successful tour across Yugoslavia, securing large popularity among Yugoslav rock fans. A group of their fans started Mladi fan club, called Klub mladih (Youth Club). On 5 November 1965, the band appeared at Zagreb Festival of Beat Music closing night, performing alongside Delfini, Uragani, Zlatni Akordi, Crveni Koralji, and other Yugoslav bands.

They traveled to West Germany once again in late 1965, performing with vocalist Zdenko Juran, formerly of Delfini. During the tour, in Hamburg's Star-Club they performed with Fats Domino. In the spring of 1966, Neugebauer decided to stay in Germany, where his father and uncle have been working as comic book artists since 1959. His decision led to the band splitting up.

=== Post breakup ===
Following Mladi disbandment, Kovačević performed with Delfini for a short period of time, before leaving the band to serve his mandatory stint in the Yugoslav People's Army. Upon his return from the army, he joined the band Zlatni Akordi.

In 1968, Neugebauer formed the band Novi Mladi (The New Young Ones) with German vocalist Ricky West and Austrian musicians Toni Schafer (guitar), Franjo Šmit (bass guitar), and Rupert Berntzitta (drums). The band saw little interest of the public and soon ended their activity. In 1969, Neugebauer formed the short-lasting band Psalentas, with Krešimir Šoštar (guitar), Tomas Krkač (bass guitar), and Zdravko Štimac (drums), alongside male vocalist Pero Granić and female vocalist Georgija Cogan.

Krešimir Radić moved to Germany and retired from music. Predrag Drezga died in a traffic accident in Germany in 1969.

=== 1969: Reformation and second disbandment ===
In 1969, Mladi were reformed in the lineup featuring two members of the original incarnation, Željko Kovačević (guitar, vocals) and Walter Neugebauer (organ), two former members of Neugebauer's band Psalentas, Tomas Krkač (bass guitar) and Krešimir Šoštar (guitar), and Boris Turina (formerly of Crveni Koralji, drums). The second incarnation of the band was short-lived, disbanding by the end of the year. However, prior to disbandment, the band appeared in Fadil Hadžić's film Wild Angels, performing the song "Rana ptica" ("Early Bird").

=== Post 1969 ===
Following the 1969 disbandment of Mladi, Kovačević moved to Biseri, and later to United Rock 'n' Roll Forces, Turina became one of the founding members of Drugi Način, and Šoštar, Štimac and Krkač started the band Nirvana.

Neugebauer formed the band Pink Elephant Set, the group releasing only a 7-inch single before disbanding. In 1979, he formed the band Cadillac. On his 2006 double compilation album Rock 'n' roll je život moj (Rock 'n' Roll Is My Life), Neugebauer released the songs he had recorded with Mladi, The Mladis, Pink Elephant Set, Cadillac, and other bands.

Following his departure from Mladi, Živković joined Grupa 220, and in 1971 joined the band Time. He later moved to New York City, where he still resides, teaching film music at a local university.

The box set Kad je rock bio mlad – Priče sa istočne strane (1956-1970) (When Rock Was Young – East Side Stories (1956-1970)), released by Croatia Records in 2005 and featuring songs by the pioneering Yugoslav rock acts, features five songs by Mladi, "Vrati se", "Tema iz filma Kapetan Leši", "Naftovod", "Mustang" and "Bongo Blues", as well as their version of "Mona (I Need You Baby)", recorded under the name The Mladis.

== Discography ==
- "Vrati se" / "Tema iz filma Kapetan Leši" / "Naftovod" / "Mustang" / "Bongo Blues" / "Mona (I Need You Baby)" (Kad je rock bio mlad – Priče sa istočne strane (1956-1970), 2005)
