= Bezimeni =

Yugoslav and Croatian rock band

Background information
- Origin: Zagreb, SR Croatia, SFR Yugoslavia
- Genres: Rock and roll; instrumental rock
- Years active: 1961–1964; 2002
- Label: Croatia Records
- Past members: Janko Mlinarić; Slaven Rački; Željko Margetić; Mahmud Ismailovski; Mario Škrinjarić; Petko Katrandžijev; Radovan Krajnović

Bezimeni (trans. The Nameless Ones) were a Croatian and Yugoslav rock band formed in Zagreb in 1961, notable as one of the pioneers of the Yugoslav rock scene. In the early 1960s, the band gained popularity with their live performances on which they covered American rock and roll hits. The group disbanded in 1964, reuniting 36 years later for a live performance, recording several of their 1960s songs for the first time.

== History ==
=== 1961-1964 ===
Bezimeni were formed in 1961 by Zagreb high school students Janko Mlinarić "Truli" (vocals, bass guitar), Slaven Rački (guitar), Željko Margetić "Marga" (guitar), Mahmud Ismailovski "Mamut" (tenor saxophone) and Mario Škrinjarić (drums). The five made an agreement to form the band during a school excursion to Poreč. They were later joined by Petko Katrandžijev "Mlinac" (keyboards), and Škrinjarić was replaced by Radovan Krajnović.

The band had their debut performance at the prestigious Zagreb Music Institute. During the following years, they would continue to occasionally perform there, although they played mostly in Zagreb clubs Medicinar (Medicine Student) and Ribnjak (Fish Pond). They played almost exclusively covers of songs by American rock and roll artists, like Elvis Presley, Bo Diddley and Chuck Berry, in which they differed from other Yugoslav bands of the early 1960s, as other Yugoslav groups of the era often performed covers of popular schlagers. Bezimeni also performed covers of instrumental songs by Johnny and the Hurricanes. The band had one appearance in the Television Zagreb children's show Slavica i Mendo. After spending the summer of 1964 performing in Zadar, Bezimeni ended their activity.

=== Post breakup ===
After Bezimeni disbanded, Mlinarić, Rački and Krajnović moved to the band Bijele Strijele. Milnarić later performed as a member of Karlo Metikoš's backing band and in 1978 founded his Trooly Studio and started a career in music production.

Ismailovski performed with the band Kennedy Boys, later moving abroad. Upon his return to Zagreb, he started a café and performed with the band Cadillac.

Katrandžijev performed with Kennedy Boys and Delfini, later starting a successful career as pop music composer and producer. His most prominent works include the songs for the popular band Indexi. In 2018, Croatia Records released a compilation of his songs composed for different artists entitled Gold Collection. For his 2019 album Francais – Electric Piano he recorded classical music pieces. He died on 20 April 2015.

Škrinjarić lost his life in 1968 in an accident in France. Margetić died in 2000.

=== 2002 reunion ===
Bezimeni reunited in 2002, performing on the celebration of Croatian national skiing team's success. The reunited Bezimeni entered the recording studio for the first time, making recordings of their old song "Shadoogie", "Crossfire" and "Revival". The songs were published on the box set Kad je rock bio mlad - Priče sa istočne strane (1956-1970) (When Rock Was Young - East Side Stories (1956-1970)), released by Croatia Records in 2005 and featuring songs by the pioneering Yugoslav rock acts.

== Discography ==
- "Shadoogie" / "Crossfire" / "Revival" (Kad je rock bio mlad - Priče sa istočne strane (1956-1970); 2005)
