= Elektroni =

Yugoslav rock band

- Origin: Karlovac, SR Croatia, SFR Yugoslavia
- Genres: Instrumental rock; beat music; rock; folk rock; rhythm and blues; pop rock
- Years active: 1961-1970
- Labels: Jugoton
- Past members: Jurica Grosinger; Ivica Bičanić; Branko Spudić; Miro Stern; Marijan Klobučar; Božidar Božek; Ivica Čadež; Marijan Banić; Mirko Novosel; Silvio Vedrina; Marjan Janjac; Vatroslav Slavnić; Boris Borošić; Darko Domijan; Velimir Cvijanović; Boris Licitar; Ratko Pogačić

Elektroni (trans. The Electrons) were a Yugoslav rock band formed in Karlovac in 1961. The band is notable as one of the pioneers of the Yugoslav rock scene.

== History ==
=== 1963–1969 ===
Elektroni were formed at the end of 1961 in Karlovac by teenagers Jurica Grosinger (guitar), Ivica Bičanić (bass guitar), Branko Spudić (drums), Miro Stern (rhythm guitar), Marijan Klobučar (keyboards) and Božidar Božek (tenor saxophone). The band had their first public performance in 1964 in their hometown, on the Mikrofon je vaš (The Microphone Is Yours) competition. Initially they performed The Shadows-influenced instrumentals, and later started performing covers of foreign rock hits, but also covers of traditional songs and their own material. The band held numerous performances on the island of Rab. In 1966, the band performed on the Zagreb Music Festival, winning the Zagreb City Silver Plaque. In May 1966, they opened the First Festival of Vocal-Instrumental Ensembles in Zagreb with an instrumental cover of the March on the Drina. In 1967, the band performed on the Second Festival of Vocal-Instrumental Ensembles. By then the band's drummer was Ivica Čadež. For a certain period of time, keyboardist Marijan Banić, vocalist Mirko Novosel and vocalist Kristijan Silvio Vedrina performed with the band, all of them leaving Elektroni after a short period of time.

In 1967, Čadež, Bićanić and Stern left the group, and were replaced by Marjan Janjac (drums), Vatroslav Slavnić (bass guitar) and Boris Borošić (rhythm guitar). The new lineup of the band turned towards pop rock sound and performing their own songs. In 1968, the band released their only EP, Jedne noći (One Night), through Jugoton record label. Beside the title track, the EP featured the songs "Drugog voliš" ("You Love Someone Else"), "Srna" ("Roe Deer") and "Sjećanje" ("Memory"). All the songs were composed by Slavnić, and the lyrics were written by young poet Velimir Franić.

The band's last lineup featured Jurica Grosinger (guitar), Vatroslav Slavnić (bass guitar), Darko Domijan (vocals, bass guitar, trombone), Velimir Cvijanović (drums), Boris Licitar (organ) and Ratko Pogačić (saxophone). The band ended their activity in 1970.

=== Post breakup ===
After Elektroni disbanded, Darko Domijan started a successful career of a pop singer. For a period of time, his backing band Peta Rijeka (Fifth River) featured his former Elektroni bandmate Boris Licitar on keyboards.

The band's short-time keyboardist Marijan Banić died in 1976, and short-time vocalist Kristijan Silvio Vedrina died in 1981. The band's original rhythm guitarist Miro Stern died in 2000, and the original bass guitarist Ivica Bičanić died in 2003.

In 2005, the song "Srna" and previously unreleased recordings "Moovin' and Groovin'" and "Začarano more" (a cover of The Islanders song "The Enchanted Sea") were published on the box set Kad je rock bio mlad - Priče sa istočne strane (1956-1970) (When Rock Was Young - East Side Stories (1956-1970)), released by Croatia Records in 2005 and featuring songs by the pioneering Yugoslav rock acts.

== Discography ==
=== EPs ===
- Jedne noći (1968)

=== Other appearances ===
- "Srna" / "Moovin' and Groovin'" / "Začarano more" (Kad je rock bio mlad - Priče sa istočne strane (1956-1970), 2005)
