= Tomaž Pengov =

Musical artist (1949–2014)

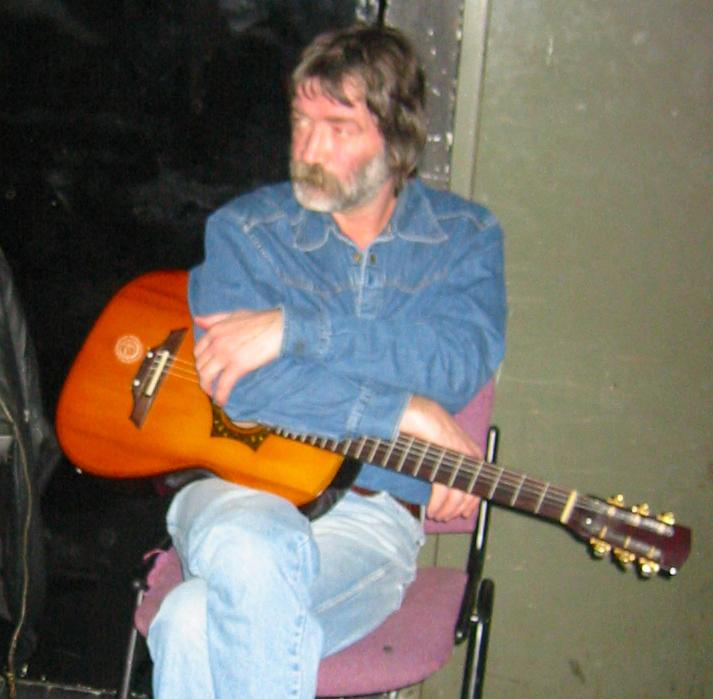
- Pengov in 2005

Background information
- Also known as: Pigl
- Born: 29 September 1949; Ljubljana, People's Republic of Slovenia, Federal People's Republic of Yugoslavia
- Origin: Ljubljana, Slovenia
- Died: 10 February 2014 (aged 64) Golnik, Slovenia
- Genres: Folk rock
- Occupations: Musician; Singer-songwriter
- Instruments: Lute; Steel-string acoustic guitar; Twelve-string guitar
- Years active: 1973–2014
- Labels: Škuc, ZKP RTVL, Sraka

Tomaž Pengov (29 September 1949 – 10 February 2014) was a Slovenian singer-songwriter, guitarist, lutist, and poet.

== Life ==
Pengov was born in Ljubljana, Slovenia, then part of the Socialist Federal Republic of Yugoslavia. He studied comparative literature at University of Ljubljana's Faculty of Arts.

== Work ==
He recorded his first album Odpotovanja in 1973. This album is considered to be the first independently released record in former Yugoslavia. It was reissued in 1981 in stereo; the original mono edition is very rare now.

Pengov sang and played the lute, steel-string acoustic guitar and twelve-string guitar. His music was lauded by many music critics as being original, and his style was very similar to that of the early Leonard Cohen.

He took eight years, from 1980 to 1988, to record his second album, Pripovedi ("Narratives"), which was released in 1988. It was recorded with guest musicians. The music is still acoustic, but more varied.

In the 1990s, he recorded two more albums, Rimska cesta (Roman road) (1992) and Biti tu (Being here) (1996). In 2011, he published the audiobook Drevo in zvezda (Tree and a star), in which he recites his poems.
