= Jugoton =

Yugoslavian record label and record store

- Founded: July 10, 1947; 79 years ago
- Defunct: 1991, now Croatia Records
- Genre: Various
- Country of origin: SFR Yugoslavia
- Location: Zagreb, SR Croatia

Jugoton was the largest record label and chain record store in the former Yugoslavia based in Zagreb, SR Croatia.

== History ==
Jugoton was formed in 1947. It replaced Elektroton, which had been founded in 1937, nationalized in 1945, and liquidated in 1947, acquiring its machines and matrices. By 1961, Jugoton was producing 2,371,600 records a year. It is notable for releasing some of the most important former Yugoslav pop and rock records. In addition, the company owned a widespread network of record shops across SFR Yugoslavia.

The company changed its name to Croatia Records in 1991, after Croatia seceded from Yugoslavia.

== Artists ==
Jugoton is notable for signing numerous eminent former Yugoslav pop and rock acts. Some of the artists that have been signed to Jugoton include:

- Aerodrom
- Ansambel Bratov Avsenik
- Silvana Armenulić
- Atomi
- Azra
- Đorđe Balašević
- Bele Vrane
- Beograd
- Halid Bešlić
- Bezobrazno Zeleno
- Bijele Strijele
- Bijelo Dugme
- Biseri
- Borghesia
- Bulevar
- Cacadou Look
- Crni Biseri
- Crvena Jabuka
- Crveni Koralji
- Zdravko Čolić
- Dah
- Daltoni
- Dʼ Boys
- Delfini (Split band)
- Delfini (Zagreb band)
- Denis & Denis
- Devil Doll
- Divlje Jagode
- Dorian Gray
- Dubrovački trubaduri
- Du Du A
- Dino Dvornik
- Električni Orgazam
- Elektroni
- Faraoni
- Film
- Garavi Sokak
- Gordi
- Grešnici
- Griva
- Grupa Marina Škrgatića
- Grupa 220
- Hari Mata Hari
- Haustor
- Hobo
- Idoli
- Indexi
- Ibrica Jusić
- Kameleoni
- Tereza Kesovija
- Kontraritam
- Korni Grupa
- Zdenka Kovačiček
- Laboratorija Zvuka
- Laki Pingvini
- Leb i sol
- Josipa Lisac
- Oliver Mandić
- Đorđe Marjanović
- Srđan Marjanović
- Seid Memić Vajta
- Metak
- Mi
- Slađana Milošević
- Zana Nimani
- Oko
- Opus
- Đorđi Peruzović
- Heda Piliš
- Osmi Putnik
- Parni Valjak
- Partibrejkers
- Pekinška Patka
- Petar i Zli Vuci
- Plavi Orkestar
- Prljavo Kazalište
- Profili Profili
- Psihomodo Pop
- Rani Mraz
- Riblja Čorba
- Rokeri s Moravu
- Sanjalice
- September
- Slomljena Stakla
- Ivica Šerfezi
- Srebrna Krila
- S Vremena Na Vreme
- Šarlo Akrobata
- Tajči
- Teška Industrija
- Time
- Neda Ukraden
- U škripcu
- Valentino
- Vatreni Poljubac
- YU Grupa
- Zabranjeno Pušenje
- Zana
- Zlatni Dečaci
- Zlatni Prsti
- Žeteoci

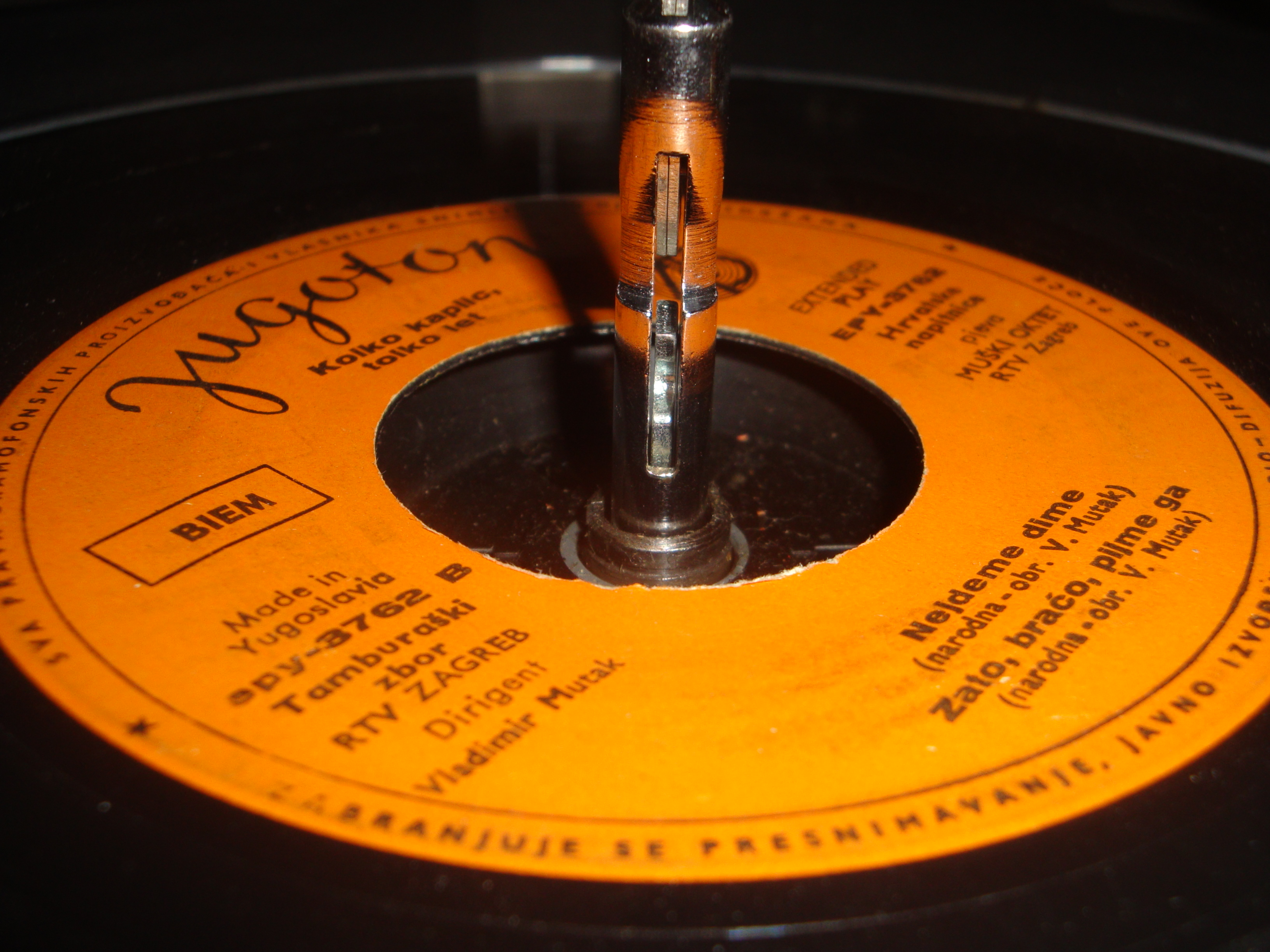
A Jugoton record.

Jugoton also released the influential compilation album Paket aranžman. Many artists that represented Yugoslavia in the Eurovision Song Contest were signed with Jugoton, including the 1989 winners Riva.

Like other former Yugoslav labels, Jugoton also had a licence to release foreign titles for the Yugoslav market including notable international popular music stars such as: Rick Astley, The Beatles, Pat Benatar, David Bowie, Kate Bush, Culture Club, Deep Purple, Duran Duran, Eurythmics, Frankie Goes to Hollywood, Iron Maiden, Kraftwerk, John Lennon, Madonna, Paul McCartney, Gary Moore, Mötley Crüe, Motörhead, Carl Perkins, Pink Floyd, Elvis Presley, Public Image Ltd, Queen, The Rolling Stones, Scorpions, Cat Stevens, U2, Whitesnake, Kim Wilde and others.

== Competition ==
Other major labels in the former Socialist Federal Republic of Yugoslavia were: PGP-RTB and Jugodisk from Belgrade, Suzy from Zagreb, Diskoton from Sarajevo, ZKP RTLJ from Ljubljana, Diskos from Aleksandrovac, and others.

== Legacy ==
=== Yugonostalgia ===
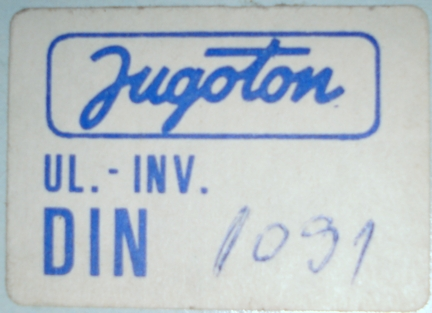
1980s price sticker featuring Jugoton company logo. The price is in Yugoslav dinars

Jugoton, as an important part of the former Yugoslav culture is one of the subjects of Yugonostalgia.

The former Jugoton record shop located in the main shopping mall in Skopje (Gradski Trgovski Centar), North Macedonia, still operates under the same name managed by the Macedonian record label Lithium Records.

An example of different kind is the online radio and web tv station called Jugoton which operates in the Yugoslav diaspora in Vienna, Austria. It plays music from the former Yugoslavia, but also from all the contemporary former Yugoslav countries, including pop, rock and folk. However, it is not formally related to the actual Jugoton, and not all the Yugoslav artists represented in its program were really signed to the label.

=== Yugoton ===
Yugoton is a Polish tribute album to the former Yugoslav rock scene released in 2001. Its title is a nod to Jugoton.

== See also ==
- List of record labels
