= Zdenka Kovačiček =

Croatian musician

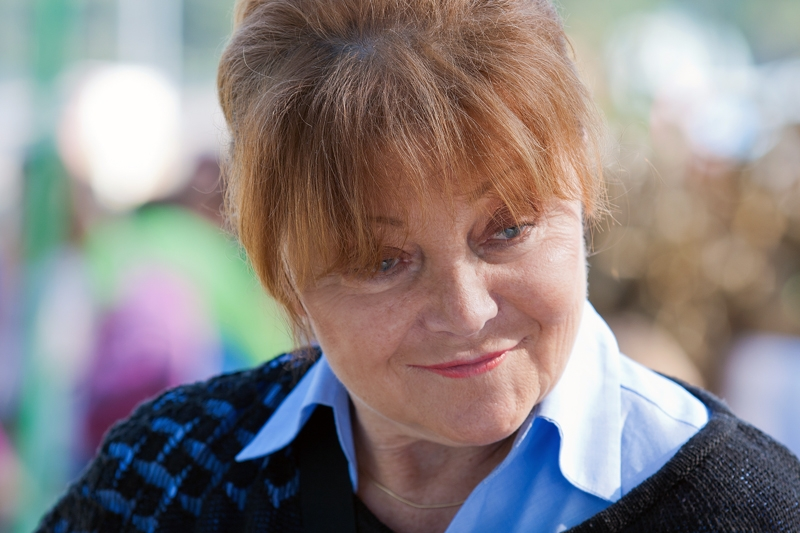
- Kovačiček in 2012.
- Born: January 16, 1944 (age 82); Zagreb, Independent State of Croatia
- Occupations: Singer; Actress
- Years active: 1957–present
- Children: 1
- Musical career
- Genres: Jazz; rock; blues; gospel; pop
- Labels: PGP-RTB; Jugoton; Suzy; Helidon; BJ Promotions; Croatia Records; Orfej; Cantus
- Website: Official website

Zdenka Kovačiček (16 January 1944) is a Croatian jazz and rock vocalist. She remains one of the most prominent musicians on the Croatian music scene.

== Early life ==
Zdenka Kovačiček was born on 16 January 1944 in Zagreb. Her father was from Tuheljske Toplice and her mother was from Dubravica. She attended the musical high school where she learned to play piano and accordion. At the age of 19, she enrolled in the foreign trade study on her parents' wish, but she never graduated due to the lack of interest. She started her career as a child at the Zagreb Youth Theater where she sang and danced. In 1957, she co-founded the duo Hani together with Nada Žitnik. They performed on TV and recorded a movie.

== Career ==
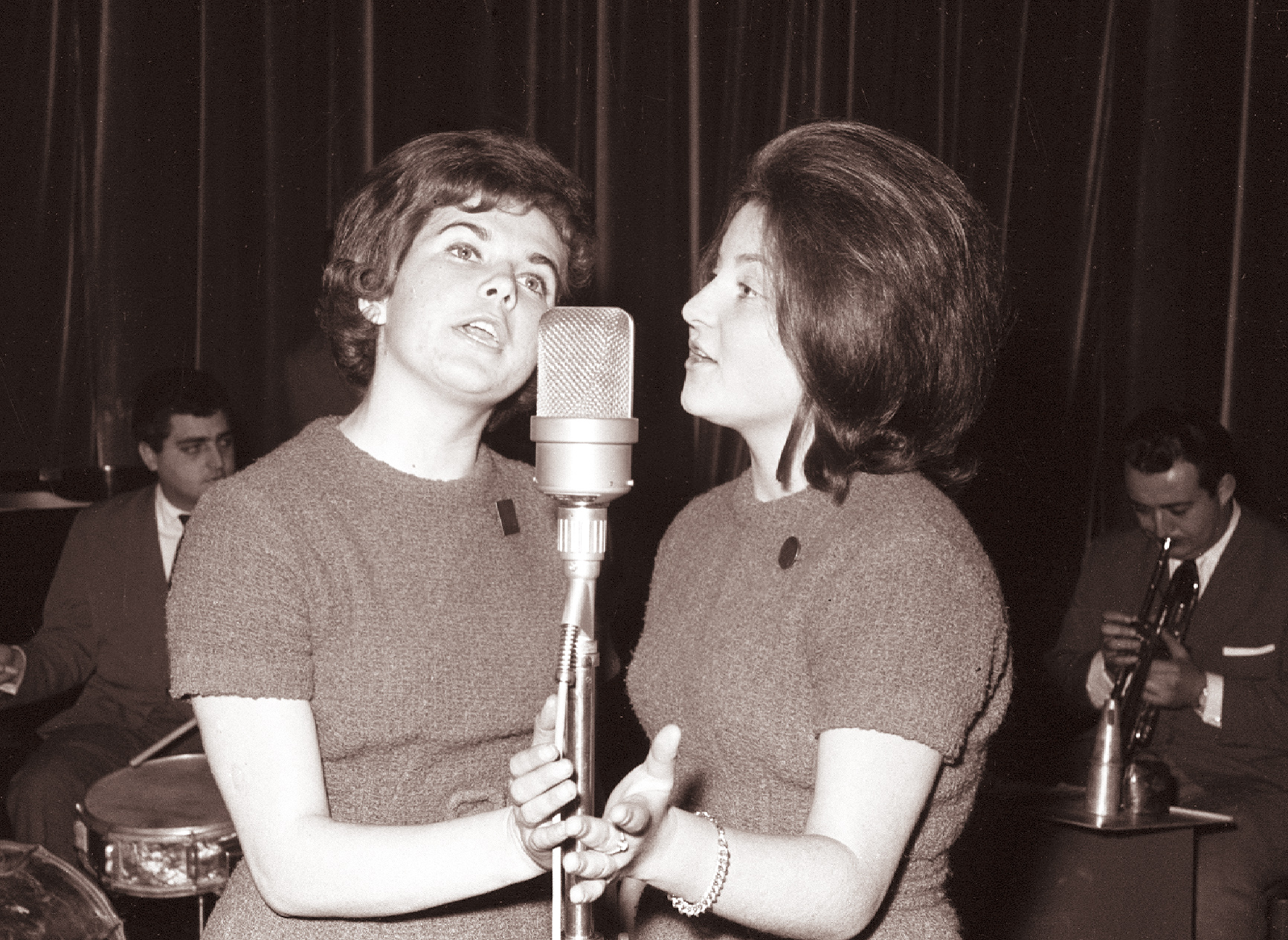
Kovačiček (right) and Nada Žitnik perform as duo Hani in Maribor in 1961.

After the duo Hani split in the late 1960s, Kovačiček started a solo career by performing at various European clubs with many successful musicians, including Bill Haley, The Kinks and The Ink Spots. It was then that she became aware of her talent for jazz, soul, and blues. After returning to Zagreb, she started performing with prominent Zagreb jazz musicians, including Boško Petrović, Miljenko Prohaska and Damir Dičić. In 1970, at the Opatija Festival, she performed the song "Zbog jedne melodije davne" [Due to an Old Tune] and won the prize of the jury. This success marked her return to the Yugoslav music scene and announced the beginning of her solo career.

During the early 1970s, she performed at various festivals, winning many musical awards. In 1971, at the Zagreb Festival, she performed the Kornelije Kovač-written song "Otvorila sam prozor" [I Opened the Window]. The same year, she performed the Vojkan Borisavljević-composed song "Ljubav" [Love] at the Belgrade Spring Festival and won the debutante prize. During 1972, she toured throughout the Soviet Union. After returning to Yugoslavia, she turned to rock music and started collaborating with the Zagreb band Nirvana. In 1973, at the BOOM Festival in Ljubljana before 7,000 people, they performed the song "Klik temu broj 1" [Click Theme No. 1], which was included on the double album BOOM Pop Fest '73 (released by Jugoton). Since then, Kovačiček bears the charism of the most sophisticated female rock vocal in Croatia.

In the mid-1970s, she performed in the rock opera Grička vještica by Ivica Krajić, Karlo Metikoš and Miljenko Prohaska in the Zagreb Comedy Theater, sang with Yugoslav jazz rock selection and took part in the recording of album Pop by Tihomir "Pop" Asanović, which was released in 1976 by the record company Jugoton. At that time, her name was mentioned in rock and jazz music, she performed on every major blues and soul ensemble, received many awards, and was proclaimed the best female vocal in Yugoslavia. In 1976, she founded the rhythm, blues, rock, and soul band Zdenka Express, with whom she performed the song "Hallo, Mr. Elton John" which is on the concert compilation of the BOOM festival '76. (published by PGP-RTB). In 1978, Kovačiček recorded an album with Igor Savin's big band that included compositions of prominent composers such as Goran Bregović, Kornelije Kovač, Vanja Lisak, Vladimir Delač and others. They collaborated with bands Nirvana, Time, Bijelo dugme, Telephone blues band and many others.

In 1981, she released the studio album Frka, published by Jugoton. Material music was written by Kire Mitrev while the lyrics were from the book "Konstatacija jedne mačke" [Finding of a Cat]" by Slavica Maras-Mikulandra. In 1989, she released an album in English, "Love is a Game", for which she collaborated with Dalibor Paulik and David Stopper. The album was promoted at festivals in Los Angeles, Finland and at Midem in Cannes. At that time, she frequently performed with the Telephone blues band led by bassist Tomas Krkac (former member of Nirvana), most often at the "Disco club Saloon" at the so-called "Ruby Tuesday".

In the late 1980s and early 1990s, they collaborated with producer and conductor Vanja Lisak. In 1991, she published Happy jazz album, containing classical jazz compositions. The album included songs by Georgie Garanjani and Peppino Principe. The album includes songs "Dobro veče jazzeri" [Good evening jazzers], "Mercedes-Benz" (originally sang by Janis Joplin), and "Zbog jedne davne melodije" [Because of an Old Melody]. During the Croatian War of Independence, she supported charity concerts throughout Croatia and abroad, where she held numerous concerts in the Cro Music Aida band. Happy jazz album vol. II was released in 1994 by the Croatia Records. Lisak and Kovačiček album material was recorded on January 2 and 3, 1993 in B.P. club and studio in Zagreb, and along with the classic jazz compositions also contains the song "Dok razmišljam o nama" [As I Think About Us] by Josipa Lisac, and songs performed by the famous Zagreb jazz musicians and Croatian Radiotelevision Tamburitza Orchestra. Kovačiček held a short tour in Austria and Italy. The compilation album "Žuta ruža" [Yellow Rose], released in 1996, contains Kovačiček's festival and radio compositions recorded between 1959 and 1995. In 1999, she collaborated with young composer Marko Tomasović, with whom she published a studio album "Zdenka Kovačiček". The song "Žena za sva vremena" [Woman for All Time] was a great success and returned her to the very top of popularity. At the 2000 Zagreb Festival, she received the Grand Prix and won with the song "Vrati se u moje dane" [Return to My Days] which was at the top of Croatian music charts.

At the beginning of 2000, Croatian Radiotelevision recorded many of her performances, including "Do zvijezda zajedno" [To the Starts Together] and one hour TV show "I to sam ja" [And That's Me]. In 2001 and 2004, she performed at the Dora pop festival. In 2001, she performed at the Croatian Radio Festival, Melodies of the Croatian Adriatic, Split Festival of Pop Music, and Etno Fest Neum. In the same year, Kovačiček signed a contract with the record label Cantus and released the album "Ja živim svoj san" [I Live My Dream] in which she sang songs by Marko Tomasović. The producer and arranger of the material was Duško Mandić. In 2002, she received Porin Award in the category of Best Female Vocal for the performance on that album. In 2004, she released the new album "To Be Zdenka".

== Acting ==
Zdenka Kovačiček became a member of the Zagreb Youth Theater (ZKM) when she was five. There, she started attending acting classes, singing, and dancing. Until the beginning of her singing career, she remained ZKM member. In 1979, she performed as grandma Urša at the Zagreb Comedy Theater's rock opera Grička vještica which was produced by Karlo Metikoš, Ivica Krajač, and Miljenko Prohaska. She made over 200 performances. From 1984 onward, she attended Marija Kohn's acting classes and later of Krešimir Zidarić in the Theater Bagatela. Delighted with Kovačiček's acting talent, Zidarić founded an acting group composed of theater enthusiasts and talented actors at the Moša Pijade University in Zagreb. They produced the comedy "Obljetnica braka" [Merriage Anniversary] in which Kovačiček and Zidarić played the main characters. In 1997, she once again got the opportunity to show her talent as an actress and imitator in her one-hour show on Croatian Radiotelevision titled "I to sam ja" [And That is Me]. Afterward, she received an invitation from famous director Damir Zlatar Frey to perform in Slovene's permanent audience in Trieste in 2002 as the main character in the rock opera "Princess of Grain Beans" [Princessa na zrnu graha]. For her performance, she received many praises from the Slovenian, Croatian, and Italian critics. She had the greatest theater success with the musical "S ljubavlju, Janis" [With Love, Janis] which premiered on 25 October 2008. The Musical was written according to an autobiographical book published in 1992 by Laura Joplin, Janis Joplin's sister, based on letters that Janis wrote regularly to her family, according to which Randall Myler wrote the Broadway hit.

== Private life ==
Kovačiček married Austrian Rudy Kamperski in 1964. They eventually divorced. She has one daughter, Tina Kristina (born 1983) who lives in New York City. Kovačiček is a feminist and is in favor of abortion rights. She is also animal rights advocate.

== Discography ==
Studio albums

- Zdenka Kovačiček (1978)
- Frka (1984)
- Love Is a Game (1989)
- Happy Jazz Album (with Georgy Garanian and Vanja Lisak Trio; 1991)
- Happy Jazz Vol. 2 (with Vanja Lisak Trio; 1994)
- Zdenka Kovačiček (1999)
- Ja živim svoj san (2001)
- To Be Zdenka (2004)
- Jazz Portrait (with Big Band HRT; 2009)
- Zdenka pjeva Ellu i Lelu (2015)
- Konstatacija jedne mačke (2021)

Compilation albums

- Žuta ruža (1996)
- Zlatna kolekcija (2009)
- Happy Jazz Revisited (with Vanja Lisak Trio; 2013)
- The Best Of Collection (2017)
