= Delfini (Zagreb band) =

Yugoslav rock band (1963–1967)

- Delfini in 1967

Background information
- Also known as: The Delfinis
- Origin: Zagreb, SR Croatia, SFR Yugoslavia
- Genres: Beat music; rock; rhythm and blues
- Years active: 1963–1967
- Labels: Jugoton, Benelux International, Croatia Records
- Past members: Zdenko Juran; Rajmond Ruić; Mladen Šurina; Branimir Baković; Velimir Neidhard; Nikola Sarapa; Petko Katrandžijev; Ivica Grčić; Vlado Kušec; Srećko Antonioli

Delfini (trans. The Dolphins) were a Yugoslav rock band formed in Zagreb in 1963, notable as one of the pioneers of the Yugoslav rock scene.

== History ==
=== 1963–1967 ===
Delfini were formed in Zagreb in April of 1963 by Zdenko Juran (vocals), Rajmond Ruić (bass guitar), Mladen Šurina (guitar), Branimir Baković (rhythm guitar), Velimir Neidhard (drums) and Vladimir Stošić (keyboards). The band had their debut performance on 26 December of the same year in Gavella Drama Theatre, performing alongside Roboti and Mladi, and soon started to perform regularly on dances.

In July 1964, on the battle of the bands held in Zagreb's Šalata, Delfini won the second place (Crveni Koralji winning the first). After this success, the band recorded several songs for Radio Zagreb, the song "Šejk" ("Shake") becoming a minor hit. The band was praised in the press, especially for Juran's on-stage performances inspired by the ones of Cliff Richard. In the following period, the band performed mostly at the Zagreb Faculty of Graphic Arts, but they also performed other venues in Zagreb. In November 1965, Delfini played on the Zagreb Beat Music Festival, performing alongside Mladi, Ptice, Uragani, Zlatni Akordi, Stalaktiti, Crveni Koralji, Šigele and the Italian band The Five Fans. During the same year, they recorded nine songs for Radio Zagreb, with the songs "Sumrak" ("Twilight") and "Noćas kad si otišla" ("This Evening after You Left"), both composed by Ruić and Baković, having most success with the listeners. With some of the recordings Delfini partially turned towards rhythm and blues. In 1966, the band appeared at the Zagreb Music Festival, becoming the third rock band (after Bijele Strijele and Crveni Koralji) to appear at this festival of pop music. On the festival, they played as the backing band for singer Zvonko Špišić, and their song "Lukrecija" ("Lucretia") appeared on the festival's official EP. In October 1966, the band performed on the battle of the bands festival entitled The First Championship of the Vocal-Instrumental Ensembles of Yugoslavia, held in Students' Center in Zagreb on 23 and 30 October. Delfini won the second place (with the band Kameleoni winning the first place).

In the autumn of 1966, Šurina and Stošić were replaced by guitarist Nikola Sarapa (formerly of Zlatni Akordi) and keyboardist Petko Katrandžijev "Mlinac (formerly of Bezimeni). The new lineup of the band recorded their debut record, the EP Gloria, released in 1967 through Jugoton. The title track was a cover of Them song "Gloria", and the EP also featured the ballad "Noćas kad si otišla", a cover of James Brown song "I'll Go Crazy" and a cover of Macedonian traditional song "Kaleš bre Anđo". The latter featured traditional instrument def, played by Pero Gotovac. After EP release, the band had successful appearances at Zagreb and Opatija music festivals. Their second EP, released during the same year, featured the song "Ne pitaj me ništa" ("Ask Me Nothing"), originally performed on the Zagreb Music Festival, as the title track. The song was composed by Ruić and featured lyrics by poet Maja Perfiljeva. The EP also featured the songs "Najljepši dan" ("The Most Beautiful Day"), written by Ivica Krajač and Nikica Kalogjera, "Bebel", written by Krajač and dedicated to Jean-Paul Belmondo, and "Najljepša kuća na prodaju" ("The Most Beautiful House for Sale"), a cover of The Kinks' "Most Exclusive Residence for Sale". Both EPs were praised by the press. During the same year, under the name The Delfinis, the band released a split 7" single with Crveni Koralji for the Belgian record label Benelux International. The single featured Crevni Koralji's song "Napoli Guitar" and Delfini's version of "Gloria".

Despite the band's success, Baković, Sarapa and Katrandžijev left the band due to disagreements with Juran and Ruić. The last lineup of the band was short-lived, featuring Zdenko Juran (vocals), Rajmond Ruić (bass guitar), Ivica Grčić (guitar), Vlado Kušec (rhythm guitar) and Srećko Antonioli (drums), all three new members formerly playing in the band Lordovi (The Lords). The group ended their activity in 1967, when part of the members were drafted to serve their mandatory stints in the Yugoslav People's Army.

=== Post breakup ===
After Delifini's disbandment, Juran started working as a music manager. Ruić moved to the band Roboti, later started a career of a successful pop composer, and eventually, in 1980, moved to Australia. In 2014, Croatia Records released the double compilation album Gold Collection, featuring his songs written for different artists, including Delfini, Peta Rijeka, Stranci, Mak, Josipa Lisac, Ana Štefok, Tomislav Ivčić and others. Serbian guitarist Vladan Živanćević recorded instrumental covers of Ruić's songs for the album Crazy Sea, released by Croatia Records in 2020. Neidhart became a professor on the Zagreb Faculty of Architecture. Baković started a career in art photography. Katrandžijev worked as a composer, sound engineer and producer. In 2018, Croatia Records released a compilation album with his songs composed for various artists, entitled Gold Collection – Jutro će promijeniti sve (Gold Collection – The Morning Will Change Everything). Sarapa performed in clubs, and in 1978 formed the band Stop.

In 2005, Delfini songs "Gloria", "Najlepša kuća na prodaju" and "Kaleš bre Anđo" appeared on the box set Kad je rock bio mlad - Priče sa istočne strane (1956-1970) (When Rock Was Young - East Side Stories (1956-1970)), released by Croatia Records and featuring songs by the pioneering Yugoslav rock acts. In 2014, both Delfini EPs were released as a part of the box set Original EP Collection.

== Discography ==
=== EPs ===
- Gloria (1967)
- Ne pitaj me ništa (1967)

=== Compilation albums ===
- Original EP Collection (2014)

=== Singles ===
- "Napoli Guitar" / "Gloria" (with Crveni Koralji, 1967)
