= Grešnici =

Yugoslav rock band

- Origin: Zagreb, SR Croatia, SFR Yugoslavia
- Genres: Beat music; rock; rhythm and blues
- Years active: 1965-1975
- Labels: Jugoton, Orfej
- Past members: Krešo Pavlić; Kruno Pavlić; Vedran Božić; Vlado Bastajić; Darko Jambrek; Nikola Sarapa; Vlado Delač; Neven Frangeš; Branko Blaće; Krešimir Šoštar; Mustafa Ismailovski; Dubravko Horvat; Pero Adamović; Marijan Kašaj; Zoran Antoljak; Mihajlo Gašparić; Marijan Baranec

Grešnici (trans. The Sinners) were a Yugoslav rock band formed in Zagreb in 1965, notable for being among the pioneers of the Yugoslav rock scene.

== History ==
=== 1965–1975 ===
Grešnici were formed in Zagreb in 1965 by brothers Krešo (organ, piano) and Kruno Pavlić (saxophone, organ, piano, vocals), Vedran Božić (guitar), Vlado Bastajić (bass guitar, vocals) and Darko Jambrek (drums). Initially, the band performed covers of international rock hits, and managed to gain some local popularity, holding regular concerts in Tucman club in Zagreb.

After their 1968 Yugoslav tour, on which they performed with new guitarist, Nikola Sarapa (who came to the band after Božić moved to Roboti), the band went on hiatus. In 1969, the band continued their activity in the new lineup, featuring, beside Bastajić on bass guitar and Jambrek on drums, guitarist Vlado Delač (formerly of Zlatni Akordi), organist Neven Frangeš and guitarist and vocalist Branko Blaće, moving from performing covers towards performing their own material. The band achieved local popularity and gained media's attention, Delač's compositions receiving praise, and Frangeš, who was 16 at the time, described by the press as a wunderkind.

In late 1960s and early 1970s, the band, led by Delač, went through numerous lineup changes, with different lineups featuring guitarist Krešimir Šoštar (later of Nirvana), keyboardists Mustafa Ismailovski "Muc" (later of Divlje Jagode) and Dubravko Horvat, bass guitarist Pero Adamović, drummer Marijan Kašaj, and vocalists Zoran Antoljak (later of Biseri), Mihajlo Gašparić "Gašo" and Marijan Baranec. Despite frequent lineup changes, the band managed to release eight 7-inch singles, scoring the hit "Mali trg" ("Little Town Square"), with "Dok sam bio zelen i mlad" ("While I Was Green and Young") and "Rijeka snova" ("River of Dreams") becoming minor hits.

The band ended their activity in 1975.

=== Post breakup ===
After his departure from Grešnici, Branko Blaće recorded two 7-inch singles as a solo artist, "Pjevaj mi pjesmu o ljubavi" / "Idi" ("Sing to Me a Song about Love" / "Go", 1972) and "Ne idi, ne idi" / "Život je lijep" ("Don't Go, Don't Go" / "Life Is Beautiful", 1973). He portrayed Matija Gubec in the rock opera Gubec beg (Gubec Bey). He also provided vocals for audio versions of rock operas Grička vještica (The Witch of Grič, 1979) and Crna kraljica (Black Queen, 1995). He acted in Komedija theatre and appeared in a number of films, including Dušan Makavejev's Manifesto (1988), Peter Richardson's The Pope Must Die (1991) and Željko Senečić's Pont Neuf (1997).

Marijan Kašaj started a career as solo singer, releasing two funk-oriented singles, "Sad je stvarno dosta tog" / "Svetac" ("I've Had Enough of It" / "Saint") and "Ideja" / "Bo-bo" ("Idea" / "Bo-bo"), both in 1975. Kašaj too appeared in rock operas Gubec beg and Grička vještica.

In 1996, the record label Orfej released the compilation album entitled 1970-1975, featuring songs from the Grešnici 7-inch singles, and, as bonus, recordings on which they performed as the backing band for different singers.

== Discography ==
=== Singles ===
- "Mali trg" / "Sve što znam" (1971)
- "Rijeka snova" / "Zadnji odsjaj sreće" (1971)
- "Tiririri Huanita / Jedino ljubav" (1971)
- "Pjesma bez riječi" / "Što da ti pružim" (1972)
- "Dok sam bio zelen i mlad" / "Dajem ti sve" (1973)
- "Kestenjar" / "Hvala ti mama" (1973)
- "Susret"/ "Tužna priča" (1973)
- "Kokošji kljun" / "Dobar stari rock'n roll" (1975)

=== Compilations ===
- 1970-1975 (1996)
