= Les Fantômes (band) =

Les Fantômes were a French rock guitar group formed in 1961. They were an instrumental group modeled on the English group The Shadows.

Les Fantômes made albums in Canada for ARC Records and in English Canada were known as "The Phantoms". They played instrumental covers of hits from groups like "The Ventures".

Les Fantômes released an album called "Wheels and Other Guitar Hits", in 1964.
