= Daltoni =

Yugoslav rock band

- Daltoni in Niš

Background information
- Origin: Niš, SR Serbia, SFR Yugoslavia
- Genres: Instrumental rock; beat music; rock
- Years active: 1963-1971 (Reunions: 1994, 2016, 2026)
- Labels: Jugoton, Croatia Records
- Past members: Branislav Cvetković; Žarko Stanković; Rista Traković; Nebojša Stojanović; Miodrag Rašić; Dušan Mitrović; Miša Tašić; Mihajlo Paligorić; Miodrag Stojanović; Goce Nikolovski; Žarko Bajagić; Dragan Nikolić; Rade Radivojević; Josip Kolbert

Daltoni (Serbian Cyrillic: Далтони; translation: The Daltons) were a Yugoslav rock band formed in Niš in 1963, notable as one of the pioneers of the Yugoslav rock scene.

Formed by high school students, Daltoni initially performed beat music, becoming one of the most popular Yugoslav bands in mid-1960s. They released their only studio release, the EP Ruka od sna, in 1968, with the title track becoming a nationwide hit. At the end of the 1960s the band moved towards more contemporary sound, but failed to sustain their popularity, disbanding in 1971.

== Band history ==
=== 1963–1971 ===
The band was formed in August 1963 by Branislav Cvetković (who at first took up guitar, but soon switched to bass guitar) Žarko Stanković (guitar), Rista Trajković (rhythm guitar), and Nebojša "Kenedi" Stojanović (drums). At the time of the formation, all of the members were sixteen years old. For their first public appearance, at the Gimnazijada festival in Skopje, the band was joined by vocalist Miodrag Rašić. At first the band performed mostly cover versions of The Shadows' songs. Daltoni had their first live appearance in their home city in 1965, at the club Index. The band would continue to perform regularly in the club, where vocal duties were occasionally given to Dušan "Čapa" Mitrović and Miša "Šolja" Tašić, and Mihajlo "Mika" Paligorić was temporarily the band's drummer. Soon, the band hired a keyboardist, Miodrag "Miško" Stojanović.

In 1966, Rašić left the band; he died several years later in a car accident. He was replaced by Goce Nikolovski from the rival group Rubinsi (The Rubies). The new lineup presented themselves for the first time at the Niš Faculty of Technical Science on 29 November 1966, and soon gained the status of a live attraction. In April 1967 they entered the finals of Zagreb Festival of Vocal-Instrumental Ensembles, and in September of the same year they won the first place at the first Niš Gitarijada festival. On 30 October, the band organized their first solo concert in Belgrade, at Belgrade Youth Center. In the first part of the concert they performed cover versions of The Beatles' songs, including most of the tracks from the album Sgt Pepper's Lonely Hearts Club Band, and in the second half they played their own songs.

By the end of 1967, the band had already changed the lineup with Trajković and Cvetković being replaced by Žarko "Baja" Bajagić (bass guitar) and Dragan "Nune" Nikolić (rhythm guitar), both former members of Rubinsi. Their transfer from Rubinsi led to a physical fight between the members of two bands, Bajagić ending up with a broken jaw. The following year, Daltoni performed at the Skopje Fair and prepared their debut EP Ruka od sna (Dream Hand), released by Jugoton record label. The EP was the first record released by a rock group from Niš. It featured four tracks: "Petak" ("Friday"), "Vraćam se ponekad u prošlost" ("I Think about the Past Sometimes"), "Volim našu istinu" ("I Love Our Truth") and the title track, which became a hit on Yugoslav radio stations. Having released the EP, the band went on a tour across SR Serbia, performing first in Niš, in December 1968, at the Park cinema, and a few days later, on 25 December, at the Golden Guitar festival held at Belgrade Fair Hall 8, ending up at the fourth place. At this performance, keyboardist Rade Radivojević performed with the band for the first time.

During the summer of the following year, the band went on an Adriatic seaside resort tour, including the MOC festival in Bečići. On their return, they held a concert at the Niš JNA Hall, and on 8 March 1970, the band organized a marathon concert in Niš's Sokolana hall, on which they performed for twenty-eight hours, thus beating the record held by the Sarajevo band Čičak, which had held a 26-hour concert. During the concert Daltoni performed over three hundred songs. This event attracted some attention from the foreign press.

During the same year, the band chose Belgrade as their new career base and in May performed at the Belgrade Spring pop festival. With the new keyboardist Josip Kolbert, the band held regular performances at the Euridika club, the Belgrade Youth Center, and in front of JNA Stadium northern entrance, expanding their repertoire with the up-to-date hits, thus changing their musical style. At the time, the majority of the band's performances were covers of songs by acts such as Jethro Tull, Family, Blood, Sweat & Tears, Sly and the Family Stone and Blodwyn Pig. In the summer of 1970, Radivojević returned to the band, and drummer Stojanović went to serve the army, being replaced by Mika Paligorić. This lineup often performed at the Niš Faculty of Civil Engineering and prepared new songs, which were recorded at the studio of Radio Niš, but the material was not released. In the meantime, in May, the band went on a tour across Istria, returning to Niš in October 1971, when they officially disbanded. During the 1970s, some of the band members held occasional club performances under the name Daltoni.

=== Post breakup ===
After Daltoni disbanded, Žarko Stanković performed in West German clubs. Upon his return to Yugoslavia, he joined the group Nova Dimenzija (New Dimension), which performed as a backing band for Yugoslav pop singers on their Soviet Union tours. During the 1980s, he led Niš-based band Dan po Dan (Day by Day), and in the late 1980s played with the band Frenky. In 1998, he released the solo album Između dva vremena (Between Two Ages), with his ethnic music-inspired guitar instrumentals. The recording of his concert held in Niš National Theatre on 10 December 1998 was released on the 1999 live album Srbija između dva vremena (Serbia Between Two Ages). With his Žar Band (Ember Band) he recorded the albums Live at Jazz Pub Orbit (2000), Žar Band (2001) and Oganj gori (The Fire Is Burning, 2006), the latter featuring mostly covers of traditional songs.

Rade Radivojević continued his career as a composer of pop, folk, instrumental, children's, theatre and film music, his compositions appearing on more that 500 releases.

After Daltoni split up, Goce Nikolovski started a career in pop music. He committed suicide on 16 December 2001.

=== Post-disbandment reunions and releases ===
In 1994, the band reunited to perform, alongside Dejan Cukić, YU Grupa, Generacija 5, Bjesovi, Galija, Ekatarina Velika, Partibrejkers, Električni Orgazam, Van Gogh, Leb i Sol, Kerber, Zabranjeno Pušenje, Riblja Čorba, Toni Montano, Rambo Amadeus, Babe, and others, on Rock 'n' Roll zauvek (Rock 'n' Roll Forever) concert held at Belgrade Fair – Hall 1.

In 1999, the unreleased recorded material, along with a part of Faculty of Civil Engineering performance and the songs from their only EP, was released on the compilation Anthology. In 2005, the song "Ruka od sna" appeared on the box set Kad je rock bio mlad – Priče sa istočne strane (1956–1970) (When Rock Was Young – East Side Stories (1956–1970)), released by Croatia Records in 2005 and featuring songs by the pioneering Yugoslav rock acts.

In June 2016 the band reunited to perform on the concert which was a part of Rok muzej uživo (Rock Museum Live) exhibit in Niš. In August 2026, the band reunited to perform on the closing night of the 32nd edition of the Nišville jazz festival, held in their home city. The festival's closing night, dedicated to 60 years of rock music in Niš, featured main stage performances by Niš groups Daltoni, Galija, Bohemija and Lavina.

== Discography ==
=== EPs ===
- Ruka od sna (1968)

=== Compilations ===
- Anthology (1999)
