= Bijele Strijele =

Yugoslav rock band (1961–1966)

Background information
- Origin: Zagreb, SR Croatia, SFR Yugoslavia
- Genres: Rock and roll; instrumental rock; beat music
- Years active: 1961–1966
- Labels: Jugoton, Croatia Records
- Past members: Ranko Bačić; Milan Gelb; Vladimir Rubčić; Ivica Banfić; Ignac Pavlović; Zlatko Tretinjak; Željko Ilić; Predrag "Doda" Drezga; Mario Škrinjarić; Zlatko Sović; Dražen Susić; Ivan Balić; Janko Mlinarić; Radovan Krajnović; Slaven Rački

Bijele Strijele (trans. The White Arrows) were a Yugoslav rock band formed in Zagreb in 1961. They were one of the pioneers of the Yugoslav rock scene.

Bijele Strijele were one of first rock bands to be formed in Yugoslavia. The band's debut EP, released in 1962, was the first record released by a Yugoslav rock band. Initially they performed covers of Cliff Richard and the Shadows, and later incorporated covers of the songs by The Beatles and other acts into their repertoire. In addition to performing international rock hits, Bijele Strijele performed their own material, being one of the first Yugoslav rock bands to compose and perform their own songs, which brought them nationwide popularity. However, in the second half of the 1960s, with the rising popularity of Yugoslav rhythm and blues bands, the group's popularity declined and they disbanded in 1966.

== History ==
=== 1961-1967 ===
Bijele Strijele were formed in the summer of 1961 by young men who met at a youth work action of building the floodbanks on the Sava river. The original lineup of the band consisted of Ranko Bačić (vocals), Milan Gelb (vocals), Vladimir Rubčić (vocals), Ivica Banfić (guitar), Ignac Pavlović (guitar), Zlatko Tretinjak (rhythm guitar), Željko Ilić (bass guitar) and Predrag "Doda" Drezga (drums). At the time of the formation, they were one of the first rock bands formed in Yugoslavia; some sources cite them as the first rock band formed in Zagreb, or even in Yugoslavia, but others cite the Zagreb band Sjene (The Shadows) as the oldest Yugoslav band. Bijele Strijele members originally chose the name Kramp (Pickaxe), as they met on a work action, but later opted for the name Bijele Strijele. The band had their debut performance in Zagreb in the autumn of 1961, gaining large attention of the public. Soon after, Drezga was replaced by Mario "Braco" Škrinjarić.

The band initially performed covers of songs by Cliff Richard and the Shadows, and later, with the appearance and rising popularity of The Beatles, Bijele Strijele incorporated their song into the repertoire. Initially, they performed on high school dances, in Zagreb clubs Varijete and Glazbenjak, in Zagreb hotel Esplanada, and in Opatija hotel Zagreb. At the end of 1962, before the recording of the band's debut EP, Pavlović and Ilić left the band. Pavlović was replaced by Zlatko Sović, Banfić moved to bass guitar and the band was joined by keyboardist Dražen Susić. The EP Svi trče oko Sue (Everybody's Runnin' around Sue) was released on 6 December 1962 through record label Jugoton. The EP was the first record released by a Yugoslav rock band. The title track was a cover of Dion song "Runaround Sue", and the EP also featured the songs "The Wanderer" (a cover of Dion song), "Rastanak" ("The Parting", a cover of the song "Sealed with a Kiss") and the instrumental track "Strijele" ("Arrows"), composed by Banfić and Tretinjak.

At the beginning of 1963, at the Zagreb Festival the band won the second place by the choice of the audience. On the festival they performed the song "Ti si moje proljeće" ("You Are My Spring"), and also performed as the backing band for the vocal quartet 4M in the song "Platno, boje, kist i twist" ("Canvas, Paint, Brush and Twist"). Both songs were publish on a split 7-inch single, and the song "Ti si moje proljeće" was also released on the festival official compilation album Zagreb 63. The band's appearance on the event saw large attention of the media, as they were the first rock band to perform on a pop festival, which was met with negative reactions by a part of the Yugoslav press. At the time Bačić left the band, and was replaced by vocalist Ivan Balić. The band's following release was a 7-inch single featuring two instrumental tracks, "Divan krajolik", a cover of The Shadows song "Wonderful Land", and "Šeći, ne trči", a cover of The Ventures version of the song "Walk, Don't Run". However, at this time, the band also started incorporating more of their original material into their set lists, which brought them large popularity with the country's young audience.

The band's second EP record, Prilika za ljubav (A Chance for Love), released in 1963, featured the song "Lađica" ("Little Boat"), written by famous Soviet composer Vasily Solovyov-Sedoi; in 1962 he heard Bijele Strijele perform in hotel Zagreb in Opatija, he liked their performance and wrote the song "Lađica" for them. The EP title track was a cover of Gene McDaniels song "Take a Chance on Love", and the EP also featured the song "Doviđenja" ("So Long", a cover of Del Shannon song "So Long Baby") and the song "Madison", written by Nikola and Olga Korbar. For their following release, a 7-inch single released also in 1963, they recorded the songs "Mrzim taj dan" ("I Hate that Day"), which was a cover of Ray Charles song "Unchain My Heart", and "Ritam želje" ("Rhythm of Desire"), written by Marija Renota and Peter Pešev. "Mrzim taj dan" featured an original arrangement for the time, opening with a sound of church organ. During 1963, the band was hired by the Yugoslav sewing machine factory Bagat to record a promotional single. The single, featuring the songs "Ana" and "Maja", named after two model's of company's sewing machines, was not available in shops, but was given by the company as promotional material. In 1963, the band also played as the backing band for Tereza Kesovija on her EP Vrijeme za twist (Time for Twist).

At the beginning of 1964, the band performed on "dance tea parties" in prestigious hotel Palace in Zagreb. During the year, Rubčić left the band. Bijele Strijele continued without him, holding several concerts in Vienna, Austria, playing as the backing band on Karlo Metikoš's Yugoslav tour and playing as the backing band on 4M EP Dolazi dan (The Day Is Coming). In 1964, they were proclaimed the second best Yugoslav band (behind Crveni Koralji) by the Yugsoslav music magazine Ritam. In 1964, the band released their last record, the EP Voli me (Love Me Do). The EP featured covers of The Beatles songs: a cover of "Love Me Do" entitled "Voli me", a cover of "From Me to You" entitled "Zbog nje" ("Because of Her"), a cover of "Please Please Me" entitled "Oprosti što sam opet tu" ("Forgive Me for Being Here Again") and a cover of "I Want to Hold Your Hand" entitled "Ljubav nas čeka" ("Love is Waiting for Us"). At the end of the year, Banfić and Škrinjarić left Bijele Strijele and were replaced by former Bezimeni members Janko Mlinarić "Truli" and Radovan "Braco" Krajnović respectively, and the band was also joined by guitarist Slaven Rački. However, with the rising popularity of Yugoslav bands which performed rhythm and blues, Bijele Strijele failed to maintain their popularity and ended their activity in the spring of 1966.

=== Post breakup ===
After Bijele Strijele split up, Mario Šrkinjarić moved to the band Jutarnje Zvijezde (Morning Stars). He continued his musical career in France, where, in 1968, he died in a car accident at the age of 33. In 1969, Drezga–who had joined Mladi in 1962–died in an accident in Germany at the age of 36. Vladimir Rubčić started a successful career as a lawyer. He died on 19 August 2011.

In 1994, all songs recorded by the band were released on the compilation album Izvorne snimke (1962.-1964.) (Original Recordings (1962-1964)) by Croatia Records.

== Discography ==
=== EPs ===
- Svi trče oko Sue (1962)
- Prilika za ljubav (1963)
- Voli me (1964)

=== Singles ===
- "Ti si moje proljeće" / "Platno, boje, kist i twist" (split single, with 4M; 1963)
- "Divan krajolik" / "Šeći, ne trči" (1963)
- "Mrzim taj dan" / "Ritam želje" (1963)
- "Ana" / "Maja" (1963)

=== Compilations ===
- Izvorne snimke (1962.-1964.) (1994)
