= Grupa 220 =

Yugoslav rock band

- Origin: Zagreb, SR Croatia
- Genres: Progressive rock, Pop music
- Years active: 1966–1975
- Labels: Jugoton, Suzy Records
- Members: Drago Mlinarec, Branimir "Brane Lambert" Živković, Vojko Sabolović, Vojislav "Mišo" Tatalović, Ranko Balen

Grupa 220 was a Yugoslav rock band from Zagreb founded in 1966. It was formed through merging previous instrumental rock groups Ehos and Jutarnje zvijezde. They are notable for publishing the first authored works in the local field of rock n' roll and the first hit in the genre, which made them popular across the country. They were one of the pioneers of Yugoslav rock music. They published their first EPs in 1967, "Osmijeh" and "Kad bih bio Petar Pan", with their first full album "Naši dani" releasing in 1968.

== Discography ==
=== EP ===
- 1967, Osmijeh (Jugoton)
- 1967, Kad bih bio Petar Pan (Jugoton)

=== LP ===
- 1968, Naši dani (Jugoton)
- 1975, Slike (Suzy)
