= San (band) =

Yugoslav rock band

- San in 1973

Background information
- Origin: Belgrade, SR Serbia, SFR Yugoslavia
- Genres: Rock; acoustic rock
- Years active: 1971–1975
- Label: PGP-RTB
- Past members: Aleksandar Ilić; Predrag Jovičić; Aleksandar Slaviković; Dragoslav Jovanović; Aleksandar Grujić

San (Serbian Cyrillic: Сан, trans. The Dream) was a Yugoslav rock band formed in Belgrade in 1971. Formed and led by keyboardist and composer Aleksandar "Sanja" Ilić, San was a prominent act of the early 1970s Yugoslav rock scene. The group disbanded in 1975, after the band's vocalist Predrag Jovičić died in concert from an electric shock.

== Band history ==
=== 1971–1975 ===
San was formed in 1971 by keyboardist and composer Aleksandar "Sanja" Ilić, formerly of the band Vragolani (The Imps). San consisted of Ilić (keyboards), Predrag Jovičić (vocals), former Bele Višnje member Aleksandar Slaviković (guitar), Dragoslav Jovanović (bass guitar) and former Smeli (The Daring Ones) member Aleksandar Grujić (drums).

In 1971, the band released their debut record, a 7-inch single featuring the songs "Tebe sam želeo" ("I Wanted You") and "Helena", through PGP-RTB record label. Two years later, the band released another single, featuring the songs "Papirni brodovi" ("Paper Ships") and "Hej, malena" ("Hey, Little Girl"). In 1974, the band released three 7-inch singles: the first one featuring the songs "Legenda" ("Legend") and "Milena", the second one featuring the songs "Jedan svet za sve" ("One World for All") and "Srce na dlanu" ("Heart on a Sleeve"), and the third one featuring the songs "Anabela" and "Zvezda ljubavi" ("Love Star"). With the song "Legenda", the band won the Second Prize on 1974 Festival Omladina in Subotica. During their activity, the band made recordings for Radio Belgrade on several occasions, performed as the backing band for popular singer Miki Jevremović and held well-received concerts on the Adriatic shore. In addition to working with San, during the band's run Ilić wrote music for the film ITD (ETC.) and the rock opera Arhanđeli i automati (Archangels and Automatons) performed in Belgrade's Dadov Theatre.

On 2 February 1975, during a concert at Čair Hall in Niš, Jovičić died from an electric shock. The tragedy caused San members' decision to split up, Ilić deciding never to perform in a rock band again.

=== Post-breakup ===
After San disbanded, Ilić continued his career as a successful composer.

In 1975, the progressive rock band Pop Mašina released the song "Rekvijem za prijatelja" ("Requiem for a Friend") dedicated to Jovičić. The song lyrics were written by S Vremena Na Vreme member Ljuba Ninković.

In 1977, former members of San, with the members of the bands Maj (May) and Korni Grupa and the vocalists Zdravko Čolić, Dado Topić, Bisera Veletanlić, Zdenka Kovačiček and Zlatko Pejaković, recorded the album Uspomene (Memories) as a tribute to Jovičić. The album featured part of the songs prepared for San's never-recorded debut album.

In 1994, the song "Legenda" was released on Komuna compilation album Sve smo mogli mi: Akustičarska muzika (We Could Have Done All: Acoustic Music), which featured songs by Yugoslav acoustic rock acts.

== Discography ==
=== Singles ===
- "Tebe sam želeo" / "Helena" (1971)
- "Papirni brodovi" / "Hej, malena" (1973)
- "Legenda" / "Milena" (1974)
- "Jedan svet za sve" / "Srce na dlanu" (1974)
- "Anabela" / "Zvezda ljubavi" (1974)
