= YU retROCKspektiva =

Compilation album series

Compilation album by Various artists
- Released: 1994
- Genre: Rock
- Label: Komuna
- Compiler: Bogoljub Mijatović, Peca Popović

YU retROCKspektiva (trans. YU retROCKspektive) is a compilation album series released by Serbian record label Komuna in 1994. The discs, compiled by Serbian music critics Bogoljub Mijatović and Peca Popović, feature songs by artists from the former Yugoslav rock scene.

== Sve smo mogli mi: Akustičarska muzika ==
Sve smo mogli mi: Akustičarska muzika

Compilation album by Various Artists
- Genre: Acoustic rock, folk rock

The disc Sve smo mogli mi: Akustičarska muzika (trans. We Could Have Done All: Acoustic Music) featured songs by artists from the former Yugoslav acoustic rock scene.

=== Track listing ===
1. S Vremena Na Vreme - "Sunčana strana ulice" - 2:44
2. Suncokret - "Prvi sneg" - 4:15
3. Srđan Marjanović - "Kad bih smeo, kad bi htela" - 3:33
4. Andrej Šifrer - "Od šanka do šanka" - 2:50
5. Miladin Šobić - "Kad bi došla Marija" - 3:18
6. Ivica Percl - "Stari Pjer" - 3:44
7. Jadranka Stojaković - "Sve smo mogli mi" - 2:36
8. Vlada i Bajka - "Oblak" - 3:30
9. Buco i Srđan - "Povratak" - 2:10
10. Rani Mraz - "Neki novi klinci" - 4:18
11. DAG - "Daj mi ruku" - 4:05
12. Maja de Rado & Porodična Manufaktura Crnog Hleba - "Nešto" - 2:34
13. Lutajuća Srca - "Još malo" - 3:50
14. San - "Legenda" - 3:40
15. Sunce - "Poslednje što bih pomislio" - 2:33

== Da li znaš da te volim: Balade ==
Da li znaš da te volim: Balade

Compilation album by Various artists
- Genre: Rock, hard rock, pop rock

The disc Da li znaš da te volim: Balade (trans. Did You Know that I Love You: Ballads) featured love ballads by former Yugoslav rock artists.

=== Track listing ===
1. Time - "Da li znaš da te volim" - 6:40
2. Bijelo Dugme - "Sanjao sam noćas da te nemam" - 6:51
3. Divlje Jagode - "Jedina moja" - 5:14
4. Parni Valjak - "Stranica dnevnika" - 4:33
5. Azra - "Ako znaš bilo što" - 4:15
6. Riblja Čorba - "Kad hodaš" - 4:00
7. Bajaga i Instruktori - "Zažmuri" - 4:02
8. Đorđe Balašević - "Jesen stiže, dunjo moja" - 3:50
9. Piloti - "Kao ptica na mom dlanu" - 5:09
10. Galija - "Da li si spavala" - 3:04
11. Viktorija - "Rat i mir" - 4:10
12. Generacija 5 - "Ti samo budi dovoljno daleko" - 5:16

== U mojim venama: Etno rock ==
U mojim venama: Etno rock

Compilation album by Various artists
- Genre: Folk rock, instrumental rock, progressive rock, hard rock

The disc U mojim venama: Etno rock (trans. In My Veins: Ethnic Rock) featured folk rock songs by former Yugoslav artists.

=== Track listing ===
1. Korni Grupa - "Pastir i cvet" - 5:11
2. YU grupa - "Kosovski božuri" - 4:30
3. Leb i Sol - "Aber dojde Donke" - 4:55
4. Smak - "Zajdi, zajdi" - 5:23
5. Bijelo Dugme - "Đurđevdan" - 3:35
6. Divlje Jagode - "Moj dilbere" - 3:25
7. Suncokret - "Moj Đerdane" - 2:56
8. Dah - "Šošana" - 2:45
9. Laza Ristovski - "Kaleš bre Anđo" - 2:50
10. Dinamiti - "Čačak kolo" - 1:40
11. Garavi Sokak - "Ako tebe ljubit ne smem" - 3:00
12. Zijan - "Stamena" - 3:35
13. Time - "Makedonija" - 4:53

== Jednoj ženi: Instrumentalna muzika ==
Jednoj ženi: Instrumentalna muzika

Compilation album by Various artists
- Genre: Instrumental rock, jazz rock, progressive rock, blues rock

The disc Jednoj ženi: Instrumentalna muzika (trans. To a Woman: Instrumental Music) featured instrumental songs by former Yugoslav artists.

=== Track listing ===
1. Zlatko Manojlović - "Jednoj ženi" - 4:18
2. Smak - "Ulazak u harem" - 4:01
3. Kornelije Kovač - "Okean" - 4:26
4. Josip Boček - "Dinamit" - 3:35
5. Leb i Sol - "Kumova slama" - 5:30
6. Bijelo Dugme - "Uspavanka za Radmilu M." - 2:17
7. Zoran Simjanović - "Pera Trta" - 3:19
8. Miki Petkovski - "Buđenje" - 4:21
9. Sanja & Sloba - "Good Morning Delta" - 5:41
10. Laza Ristovski - "Iza horizonta" - 7:35
11. Srđan Marjanović - "Blues za usnu harmoniku" - 4:54
12. Radomir Mihajlović Točak - "Vizantijsko plavo" - 4:48

== Pakleni vozači: Jugoslovenski hard rock ==
Pakleni vozači: Jugoslovenski hard rock

Compilation album by Various artists
- Genre: Hard rock, heavy metal, glam metal

The disc Pakleni vozači: Jugoslovenski hard rock (trans. Hell Riders: Yugoslav Hard Rock) featured songs by former Yugoslav hard rock and heavy metal artists.

=== Track listing ===
1. Atomsko Sklonište - "Pakleni vozači" - 3:15
2. Divlje Jagode - "Motori" - 4:30
3. Gordi - "Put do pakla" - 3:40
4. Rok Mašina - "Nulti čas" - 6:48
5. Smak - "Crna dama" - 3:22
6. Vatreni Poljubac - "Doktor za Rock 'n' Roll" - 4:12
7. Pomaranča - "Moli s kom si legla nocoj" - 3:50
8. Šank Rock - "Ja nemam noć da spavam" - 3:25
9. Viktorija - "Od Splita do Beograda" - 3:50
10. Osmi Putnik - "Glasno, glasnije" - 2:42
11. Karizma - "Daj mi" - 3:13
12. Osvajači - "Pronađi me" - 4:23
13. Legija - "Pakleni stroj" - 3:46
14. Kerber - "Mezimac" - 3:35

== Niko kao ja: Jugoslovenski novi talas ==
Niko kao ja: Jugoslovenski novi talas

Compilation album by Various artists
- Genre: New wave, punk rock, post-punk, alternative rock

The disc Niko kao ja: Jugoslovenski novi talas (trans. No One like Me: Yugoslav New Wave) featured songs by artists from the former Yugoslav new wave scene, but also songs by the acts which emerged from the scene, Katarina II and Disciplina Kičme.

=== Track listing ===
1. Bulevar - "Nestašni dečaci" - 3:29
2. Prljavo Kazalište - "Crno-bijeli svijet" - 3:13
3. Šarlo Akrobata - "Niko kao ja" - 1:30
4. Idoli - "Maljčiki" - 3:18
5. Film - "Neprilagođen" - 3:44
6. Električni Orgazam - "Korokodili dolaze" - 3:33
7. Piloti - "Ne veruj u idole" - 2:40
8. Haustor - "Moja prva ljubav" - 5:23
9. Pekinška Patka - "Bolje da nosim kratku kosu" - 2:26
10. Kontraritam - "Sretne noge" - 2:39
11. Paraf - "Živjela Jugoslavija" - 2:15
12. Disciplina Kičme - "Javno veselje" - 4:07
13. Katarina II - "Radostan dan" - 4:06
14. Azra - "Jablan" - 2:28
15. Petar i Zli Vuci - "Ogledalo" - 3:28

== Sjaj izgubljene ljubavi: Muzika šezdesetih ==
Sjaj izgubljene ljubavi: Muzika šezdesetih

Compilation album by Various artists
- Genre: Beat music, rock and roll, rhythm & blues, pop rock

The disc Sjaj izgubljene ljubavi: Muzika šezdesetih (trans. Spark of the Lost Love: Music of the Sixties) featured songs by former Yugoslav acts from the 1960s, mostly by beat bands.

=== Track listing ===
1. Indexi - "Pružam ruke" - 2:30
2. Elipse - "Pogledaj kroz prozor" - 2:10
3. Bele Vrane - "Presenečenja" - 2:34
4. Džentlmeni - "Slomljena srca" - 2:35
5. Mladi Levi - "Poljubi me in pojdi" - 2:48
6. Crveni Koralji - "Kad bih bio drvosječa" - 2:06
7. Zlatni Akordi - "Sunce sja za nas" - 2:57
8. Korni Grupa - "Slika" - 4:11
9. Crni Biseri - "Nisam više taj" - 2:19
10. Zlatni Dečaci - "Čudna devojka" - 3:00
11. Siluete - "Tvoj rođendan" - 2:33
12. Kameleoni - "Sjaj izgubljene ljubavi" - 2:48
13. Roboti - "Mramor, kamen i željezo" - 2:46
14. Mi - "Sjećanja" - 3:10
15. Grupa 220 - "Osmijeh" - 2:50
16. Dinamiti - "Čađava mehana" - 3:05

== Volim, volim, volim žene: Pevačice i ženske grupe ==
Volim, volim, volim žene: Pevačice i ženske grupe

Compilation album by Various artists
- Genre: Beat music, new wave, synthpop, pop rock, funk rock

The disc Volim, volim, volim žene: Pevačice i ženske grupe (trans. I Love, I Love, I Love, I Love Women: Female Singers and Girl Bands) featured songs by former Yugoslav female solo singers, all-female bands and bands with female vocalists.

Unlike the other discs, which were named after a song which appears on them, Volim, volim, volim žene: Pevačice i ženske grupe was named after the Riblja Čorba song "Volim, volim, volim, volim žene" from their 1981 album Mrtva priroda.

=== Track listing ===
1. Sanjalice - "Mi mladi" - 2:37
2. Josipa Lisac - "Što me čini sretnom" - 3:40
3. Zdenka Kovačiček & Mladi Levi - "Otvorila sam prozor" - 3:45
4. More - "More" - 5:45
5. Zana - "Dodirni mi kolena" - 4:48
6. Xenia - "Troje" - 3:51
7. Slađana Milošević - "Bez nade" - 3:03
8. Bebi Dol - "Rudi" - 4:20
9. Denis & Denis - "Program tvog kompjutera" - 4:12
10. Boye - "Kao kada gubiš glavu" - 3:26
11. Cacadou Look - "Sama" - 2:40
12. Viktorija - "Arija" - 3:50
13. Stijene - "Sve je neobično" - 4:56
14. Oktobar 1864 - "Crni ples" - 3:56

== Plima: Progresivna muzika ==
Plima: Progresivna muzika

Compilation album by Various artists
- Genre: Progressive rock, symphonic rock, psychedelic rock

The disc Plima: Progresivna muzika (trans. Tide: Progressive Music) featured songs by former Yugoslav progressive rock artists.

=== Track listing ===
1. Indexi - "Plima" - 5:06
2. Korni Grupa - "Prvo svetlo u kući br. 4" - 15:02
3. Srce - "Gvendolina" - 5:14
4. Time - "Divlje guske" - 4:40
5. Dogovor iz 1804. - "Sećanje na san" - 6:10
6. Drugi Način - "Stari grad" - 7:10
7. Pop Mašina - "Kiselina" - 4:10
8. Nepočin - "Čekati moj hit" - 7:04
9. Igra Staklenih Perli - "Gušterov tr(a)g" - 4:27
10. Tako - "U vreći za spavanje" - 6:05

== Kurvini sinovi: Protestne pesme ==
Kurvini sinovi: Protestne pesme

Compilation album by Various artists
- Genre: Rock, hard rock, punk rock

The disc Kurvini sinovi: Protestne pesme (trans. Sons of Whores: Protest Songs) featured political- and social-related songs by former Yugoslav artists.

=== Track listing ===
1. Azra - "Kurvini sinovi" - 3:27
2. Riblja Čorba - "Pogledaj dom svoj, anđele" - 3:31
3. Đorđe Balašević - "Ne lomite mi bagrenje" - 5:33
4. Atomsko Sklonište - "Ne cvikaj, generacijo" - 5:09
5. ITD Band - "Majko zemljo" - 2:54
6. Balkan - "Trideset peta-šesta" - 3:00
7. Buldožer - "Novo vrijeme" - 2:45
8. Galija - "Korak do slobode" - 2:50
9. Zabranjeno Pušenje - "Nedelja kad je otiš'o Hase" - 4:07
10. Elvis J. Kurtovich - "Haile Selasije" - 4:39
11. Pankrti - "Zastave v prvem planu" - 4:20
12. Lačni Franz - "Sretno Kekec" - 4:10
13. Džukele - "Amerika" - 3:02
14. Ekatarina Velika - "Zajedno" - 3:20
