= The Earth Is Dancing =

"The Earth is Dancing" (in Slovene: "Zemlja pleše") is a 1962 pop song, music of which was written by Mojmir Sepe based on a lyrics by Slovene poet Gregor Strniša that was awarded at the first edition of the Slovenian song festival where it was sung by a notable singer Marjana Deržaj. The song became an evergreen, a popular and enduring example of Slovenian popular music. It has been since then released in a number of re-mixes. It also inspired one of the first musical videospots made in 1980s in Slovenia, at the time part of Yugoslavia, where both the videospot and the song were also popular.

== The 1980s remake and videospot ==
In 1986, the song was remade in synthpop style by a Slovenian teenage group Videosex and sung by singer Anja Rupel. The remake inspired Max Marijan Osole, one of the first videomakers in Slovenia, to make a musical videospot with a 1980s computer animated background.
