= Mladi Levi =

Yugoslav rock band

Background information
- Origin: Ljubljana, SR Slovenia, SFR Yugoslavia
- Genres: Rock; rhythm and blues; soul; jazz rock
- Years active: 1966–1975
- Labels: Pioneer Records, PGP-RTB, ZKP RTLJ, ZKP RTVS
- Past members: Tomaž Habe; Bor Gostiša; Jernej Podboj; Peter Hudobivnik; Matjaž Deu; Janez Bončina; Petar Ugrin; Branko Weissbacher; Berti Rodošek; Jernej Jung; Vasja Repinc; Dušan Kajzer; Stanko Arnold; Tone Janša; Boris Šingoj; Roman Mazej; Aleš Strajner; Marko Misjak

Mladi Levi (trans. The Young Lions) were a Yugoslav rock band formed in Ljubljana in 1966. Gaining popularity with their rhythm and blues and soul sound, the group moved towards jazz rock in early 1970s. The group disbanded in 1975, after releasing one studio album and several 7-inch records. Mladi Levi–as other 1960s Yugoslav bands–played a pioneering role on the Yugoslav rock scene, and are considered, alongside Belgrade-based Elipse and Šibenik-based Mi, the most prominent representatives of the Yugoslav 1960s soul scene.

== History ==
=== 1966–1975 ===
Mladi Levi were formed in 1966 by Tomaž Habe (organ, vocals), Bor Gostiša (rhythm guitar, vocals), Jernej Podboj (tenor saxophone), Peter Hudobivnik (bass guitar) and Matjaž Deu (drums). The name for the group was suggested by their manager and lyricist Dušan Velkaverh, and was inspired by 1958 film The Young Lions, based on the novel of the same name by Irwin Shaw.

Soon after the formation, Mladi Levi attracted the attention of the label Pioneer Records from the neighboring Italy, which released the band's debut 7-inch single in 1967. The single, featuring the songs "An Echo of My Dreams" and "A Man With the Mission", saw very little attention of the public and the media. In late 1967, Gostiša left the band, joining Bele Vrane, and was replaced by Janez Bončina "Benč", formerly of the band Helioni (The Helions). Simultaneously, Mladi Levi completed their brass section with the arrival of Petar Ugrin (trumpet and violin, a former member of Academical Jazz Orchestra, at the time playing with Ljubljana Philharmonic Orchestra) and Branko Weissbacher (baritone saxophone), with Velkaverh also starting to occasionally appear on stage with the band as vocalist. The group attracted attention of the Yugoslav public with their rhythm and blues and soul sound, having their first bigger success with the song "Oda Irei" ("Ode to Irene"), recorded with singer-songwriter Tomaž Pengov–who had also authored the song lyrics–as guest vocalist, and broadcast on Yugoslav radio.

In April 1968, Habe left Mladi Levi, Velkaverh also ending his collaboration with the band. The group was joined by organist and vocalist Berti Rodošek. The new lineup performed at SR Slovenia's first Guitar Festival, and was pronounced the second best band by the jury, while the audience polled them as the best group on the festival. In the summer of the same year, Mladi Levi, alongside the band Elipse from Belgrade, represented Yugoslavia at the 9th World Festival of Youth and Students, held in Sofia, Bulgaria. Since the two bands had similar musical directions, they decided to have a joint performance at a park situated in the city centrum. As soon as the performance had started, the audience started clapping their hands to the rhythm of the music, which provoked the Bulgarian police to stop the performance after ten minutes and brutally attack the audience. Despite the incident, Elipse got the silver medal for the second best music performance at the festival. On 3 September, Mladi Levi performed at the First Yugoslav Pop Festival, held in Zagreb, winning the Instrumental Performance Award for their song "Ljubimo soul" ("We Love Soul") and the Best Lyrics Award for the song "Carnaby Street", while their song "Poljubi me in pojdi" ("Kiss Me And Go") was polled the fifth best song by the festival's audience. During the year, the band held several performances in Ljubljana's Tivoli Hall, with the Yugoslav music press praising their musicianship.

Mladi Levi soon saw another lineup change, with Rodošek leaving to study jazz at Graz University of Music and Performing Arts, and Weissbacher leaving to serve his mandatory stint in the Yugoslav army. The band's new members became vocalist Jernej Jung and organist Vasja Repinc, the latter formerly of Bele Vrane. The new lineup recorded the band's first Yugoslav release, the EP Mila mala ("Sweet Little One"). Alongside the title track, "Ljubimo soul" and "Poljubi me in pojdi", the EP also featured a cover of Sam & Dave song "When Something Is Wrong with My Baby". Later that year, the group appeared on the Opatija Festival, performing the song "Oluja" ("Storm"). As Opatija Festival was at the time a competition of musical compositions rather than music acts, every song was performed in two different versions; the other version of "Oluja" was performed by Josipa Lisac. In June of the same year, the band appeared at the Slovenska popevka festival, performing the song "Zaznamovan" ("Marked"), winning the third place. On the same festival, the group also performed as the backing band for soul singer Alenka Pinterič. The group celebrated their third birthday with a concert in Ljubljana's Tivoli Hall, held on 25 October 1969. On the concert, they presented new members: Dušan Kajzer (formerly of Albatrosi, guitar), Stanko Arnold (trumpet), Tone Janša (saxophone), and Boris Šingoj (trombone). At the time, Jung had already left the band, and Benčina took over the role of the group's frontman. Simultaneously, the band had started to collaborate with music arranger Dečo Žgur, presenting the results of some of their musical experiments on their 1969 concert in Belgrade's Trade Union Hall.

With the beginning of the 1970s, the band turned to jazz rock, also introducing a number of Blood, Sweat & Tears songs into their repertoire. Following the 1970 Blood, Sweat & Tears concert in Ljubljana, Mladi Levi held a concert for the members of the American band in Ljubljana's Stop music club, the concert eventually turning into a jam session of musicians from both groups. Mladi Levi appeared on the 1970 Subotica Youth Festival with the song "Kad su zvijezde padale" ("When Stars Were Falling"); the song would be released ten years later on the festival's double compilation album 20 godina festivala Omladina (20 Years of Youth Festival). The group also appeared on the 1970 edition of Slovenska popevka, performing the song "Ljubezen" ("Love"), the song appearing on the festival's official compilation. By the end of the year, Benčina left the band, and was replaced by vocalist Roman Mazej.

In 1971, the band released their only studio album. The album, entitled simply Mladi Levi was released through ZKP RTVLJ record label on audio cassette only, featuring the band's songs as well as covers of international rock hits. During the year, the band performed on the Rock Evening of Zagreb 71 music festival, alongside British bands Mungo Jerry, The Pretty Things, Southern Comfort and Juicy Lucy. On the 1971 edition of Slovenska popevka, Mladi Levi won the Best Performance Award for their song "Gostja" ("Guest"). In 1972, they performed at the BOOM Festival, held in Ljubljana, with their instrumental song "Spominjam se antimaterije" ("I Remember Antimatter") appearing on the double live album Pop Festival Ljubljana 72, recorded at the event. The band also performed, alongside Korni Grupa, Time and YU Grupa, on the Rock Evening of Belgrade Spring festival.

At the end of 1973, Ugrin, Podboj and Šingoj joined the supergroup Jugoslovenska Pop Selekcija. Mladi Levi continued their activity–with some of the later lineups including guitarist Aleš Strajner and trumpeter Marko Misjak–but performed rarely, occasionally playing as backing band for popular Slovenian singers. The group finally disbanded in 1975.

=== Post breakup ===
After leaving the group in 1970, Benčina joined The Generals. In 1972, he formed the band Srce, which was short-lived but is remembered for the hit "Gvendolina gdo je bil?" ("Who was Gwendolyn?"). Following the disbandment of Srce, Benčina was a vocalist for Jugoslovenska Pop Selekcija and September, later starting a solo career.

Following the end of his collaboration with Mladi Levi, Dušan Velkaverh worked as the director of RTV Ljubljana's music production, and later as the managing director of Corona record label. He wrote lyrics for more than 600 songs by Yugoslav and Slovenian artists, often using the pen name Peter Arnold. He died on 1 February 2016.

In 1999, ZKP RTVS released Mladi Levi compilation album Antologija (Anthology), which included previously unreleased recordings by the band.

A documentary film about the group, directed by Dejan Batoćanin and entitled Mladi Levi: Polnost časa (Mladi Levi: The Fullness of Time), premiered in 2016.

== Discography ==
=== Studio albums ===
- Mladi Levi (1971)

=== EPs ===
- Mila mala (1969)

=== Compilation albums ===
- Antologija (1999)

=== Singles ===
- "An Echo of My Dreams" / "A Man With the Mission" (1967)
- "Odprite okna vojna je končana" / "Ostro kakor nož (Blesna kakor nož)" (1971)
