= Bećarac =

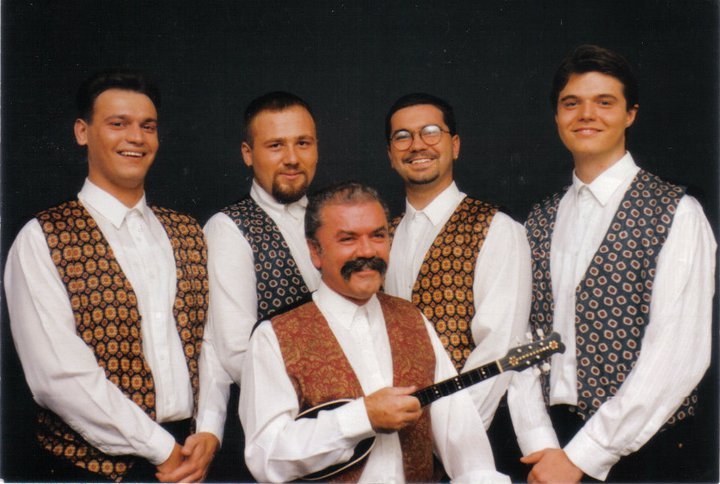
- Slavonski bećari ensemble in 1997
- Stylistic origins: Croatian music
- Cultural origins: Slavonia

Bećarac singing and playing from Eastern Croatia
- UNESCO Intangible Cultural Heritage
- Country: Croatia
- Reference: 00358
- Region: Europe and North America

Inscription history
- Inscription: 2011 (6th session)
- List: Representative

Bećarac is a humorous form of folk song, originally from rural Slavonia, Croatia, and eventually spreading to southern Hungary and the Vojvodina region of Serbia. Its name comes from the Serbo-Croatian word bećar (from Turkish: bekâr), meaning "bachelor", "reveler" or "carouser". Bećarci verses are typically teasing, mocking and/or lascivious in nature, and are often sung by male company at village parties ("sijelo" or "kirvaj" (kermesse)) or weddings. However, they are also sung by women in equal footing, especially in kolo dance circles.

== Description ==
Bećarac uses a strict form of couplet in trochaic decasyllable, always sung to the same music, played by a tamburitza orchestra, less common accordion or samica, or just by a choir. The first verse is sung by the choir leader and forms a logical thesis; it is repeated by the choir. The second verse is a humorous antithesis, also repeated by the choir (but often broken by laughter). Bećarci are usually performed at the peak of a party as a drinking song after the crowd is sufficiently warmed up by wine and music. A series of bećarci can last indefinitely. The lyrics are often made up at the spot or improvised, and the best ones are spread and reused for later parties.

Bećarci are often difficult to translate and to be understood by outsiders due to the use of puns, reference to local events and cultural allusions. For example, "Mala moja, visoki jablane / Je l' ti mjesec vidio tabane?" literally translates to "My little one, tall apple tree / Has the moon seen your soles?".

== History ==
It is believed that bećarac originated in the late 19th with the abolishment of the Croatian Military Frontier, a borderland of the Austro-Hungarian Empire.

Friedrich Salomon Krauss, an ethnographer born in Požega, studied and collected around two thousand bećarac songs.

=== UNESCO's protection ===
In 2009, Croatia submitted the bećarac among others for inclusion in the UNESCO Intangible Cultural Heritage Lists. In 2010, the attempt was again unsuccessful, and English translations were made for better reference. In 2011, it was finally included on the list.

=== Bećarac museum ===
In 2017, it was announced that a museum dedicated to bećarac would be opening in the town of Pleternica, Croatia. The concept was described by the director as contemporary museum which would tell the traditional heritage of bećarac in a modern setting. Due to bećarac being a vital part of the intangible cultural heritage of Croatia, 85% of the museum project was funded by the European Union, with expectations of it having a positive impact on the well-being of the town and the entire region.

== See also ==
- Chastushka, short Russian humorous folk song
