= Igor Milić =

Croatian musician (born 1972)

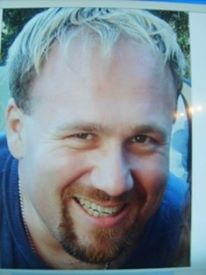

Background information
- Born: October 5, 1972 (age 54)
- Origin: Osijek, Croatia
- Genres: Pop, Folk
- Occupations: musician, instrumentalist, singer, record producer, arranger, composer, music teacher
- Instruments: tamburitza, bass guitar, guitar

Igor Milić (born October 5, 1972 in Osijek) Croatian musician, instrumentalist, singer, record producer, arranger, composer and music teacher.

== Biography ==
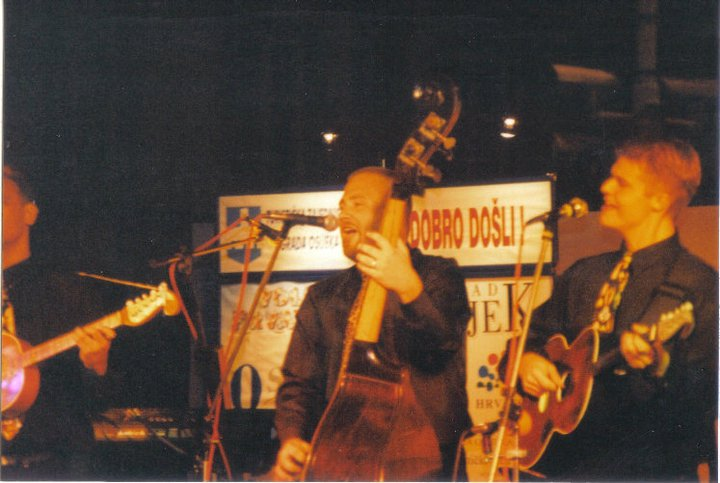
From left to right: Dalibor Stanarević, Igor Milić, Boris Kiraly

=== Musical beginnings ===
Igor Milić was born on October 5, 1972, in Osijek, Croatia. His first contact with music was when, as a five-year-old boy, he started to play the guitar and tamburitza (a Croatian stringed folk instrument, similar to the guitar) for his family. When he was nine years old, he started to participate in Josip Kolaric's tamburitza orchestra in which he played different kinds of tamburitza: brač, čelo, bugarija and berda. He continued with this orchestra for 5 years and performed in number of tamburitza reviews and festivals, in which the orchestra received many prestigious awards. While playing in Josip Kolaric's orchestra, beginning in 1982, he also played bugarija in the folklore society "Biseri Slavonije", led by Franjo Slavko Batorek. He played with this orchestra until 1987 when he moved to the folklore society "Srđan Petrov", where he stayed until 1991, also playing bugarija, berda and brač in the national orchestra led by Miroslav Tanacković and in the tamburitza band led by Zvonko Murinji. During the period 1987 to 1991, he also played berda and sang in the tamburitza band "Bekrije". In the period 1991 to 1997, he played with many tamburitza bands, such as "Josip Batorek" with berda and bugarija, as well as with several popular bands ("Zlatne Suze", "Pink Lady", "Vanessa Band" – bass guitar, guitar, vocal), and made some notable performances, such as Sinisa Cmrk's "Turbo Limač Show", and as backup artist with a number of renowned Croatian singers.

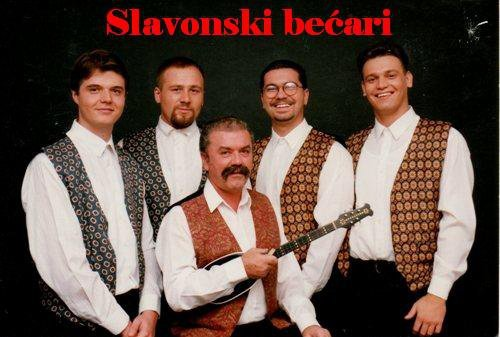
Slavonski Bećari 1997

=== Slavonski bećari ===
His professional music career started in 1997 with the legendary tamburitza band "Slavonski bećari" led by Antun Nikolić Tuca, in which he played berda and sang until 2007. With this band he played in many concerts around the world, participated in more than 200 television performances and 24 music festivals. He performed with such well-known artists as Krunoslav Kićo Slabinac, Miroslav Škoro, Đuka Čajić, Marta Nikolin, Stjepan Jeršek Štef, Željko Lončarić Žec, Davor Radolfi, Milo Hrnić, and Pero Panjković. "Slavonski Bećari" won many awards and tributes, not only in Croatia, but also around the world. In 1997, "Slavonski Bećari" published a studio album "Baš je bila luda godina", and in 2003, "Narodne božićne pjesme". It has also published 22 studio-recorded festival editions.

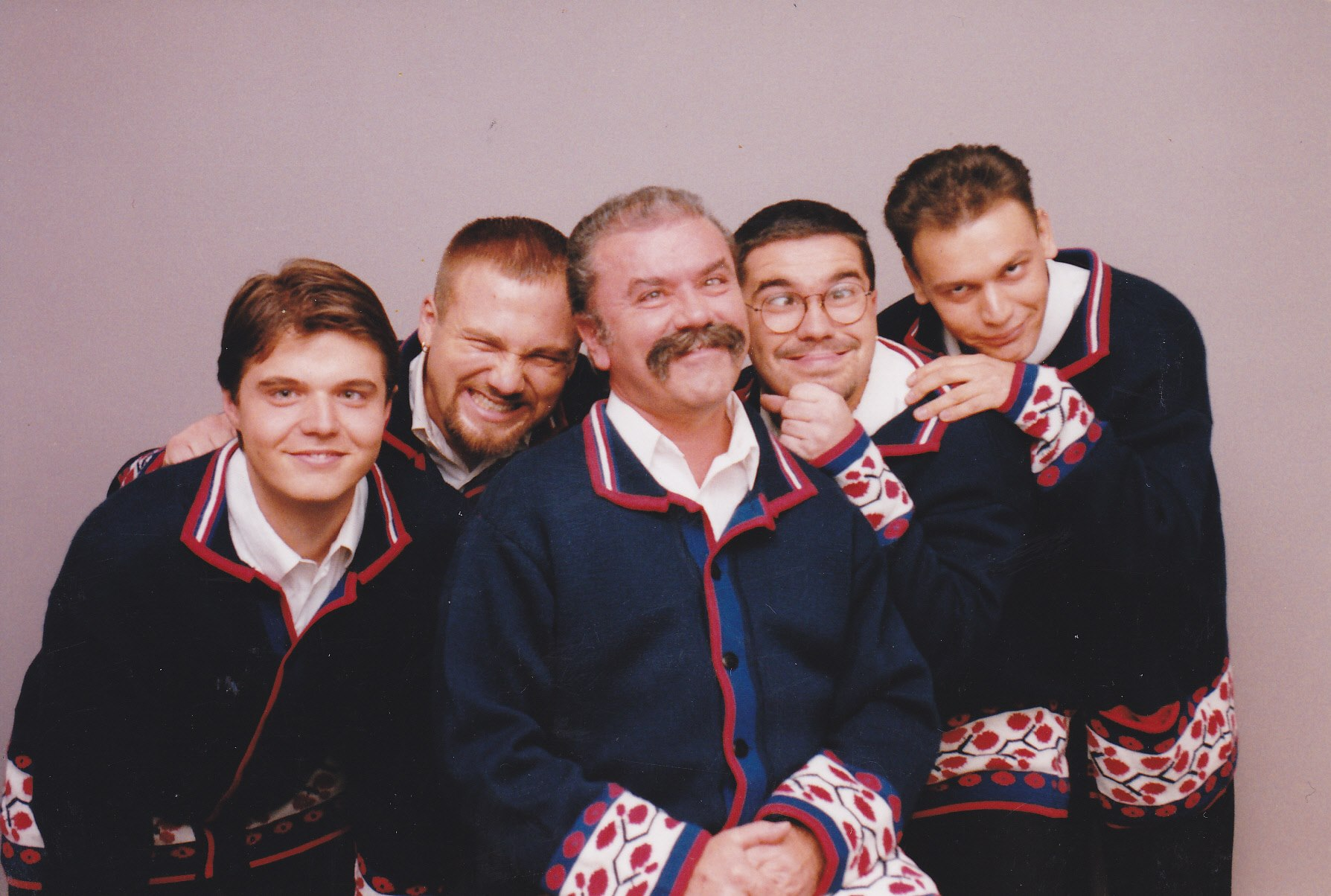
Slavonski Bećari – Boris Kiraly, Igor Milić, Antun Nikolić, Mario Nikolić, Dalibor Stanarević

=== Studio "Emaus" ===
In 2003, Igor Milić founded his music studio "Emaus" in which he works as record producer, arranger, composer, audio mastering engineer, studio instrumentalist and singer. Since 2005, he has focused his studio work on spiritual Christian music. Under "Emaus" he has produced several albums: Izbroj darove (production), Sanctus (production, arrangement, instrumentation: guitar, bass guitar, solo guitar, berda, contrabass), Radost s neba (production, arrangement, instrumentation: guitar, bass guitar). He also produced songs for several religious music festivals: Bonofest, Krapinafest, Svjetlost dolazi for which he made arrangements and instrumentation in addition to production. The work of Studio "Emaus" has also included the production of the Croatian version of the world famous evangelistic children's musical, "Puzzles", in which he spoke the part of one of the main characters. He has participated with theatrical producer Richard Montez, founder of the international theatre "Cornerstone Arts", who gave Igor Milić one of the main roles in the musical Joseph and the Amazing Technicolor Dreamcoat, composed by Andrew Lloyd Webber, that was performed in Osijek and Slavonski Brod. For the same musical, he directed the orchestra in Arena in Varaždin. During the year 2013, he did the entire music production for Les Misérables, composed by Claude-Michel Schönberg., for Cornerstone Arts.

=== Tamburitza school ===
In 2008, together with Emerik Huđik, he founded the tamburitza school in Erdut, under the auspices of the folklore society "Šandor Petefy". In this school he works as the music pedagogue and teacher of tamburitza and is the leader of two orchestras with more than 30 children participating. These orchestras have performed various places in Croatia, Hungary, Slovenia and Slovakia, and have also performed with many famous musicians, including Antun Nikolić Tuca, Igor Delač, Mario Roth, Adriana Baković. In addition to writing out many arrangements for the tamburitza orchestra, he has also transcribed 16 indigenous national Hungarian songs from the area of Dalj Planina. The folklore society and its school of tamburitza have won many prizes and tributes, including a 2014 Republic of Hungary Award for promoting and preserving cultural heritage.

== Discography ==
=== Slavonski bećari ===
==== Albums ====
- 1997 Baš je bila luda godina
- 2003 Narodne božićne pjesme

==== Festivals ====
Brodfest

- 1997 "Vukovaru, srećo, dobar dan"
- 1998 "Sveta Kata, snig za vrata"
- 1999 "Kuco moja na pol' šora"
- 2000 "Najlipše su cure u Daražu"
- 2001 "Dođi, diko, na šokačko sijelo"
- 2003 "Vatra ivanjska"
- 2004 "Lovačka himna"
- 2005 "Ej, ravnico, moja mati"
- 2007 "Oj, djetešce moje drago"

Požega festival "Zlatne žice Slavonije"

- 1996 "Kapo moja poderana"
- 1997 "Otac mi je stari tamburaš"
- 1998 "Pokid'o sam na biciklu žbice"
- 2001 "Da se meni još jedanput roditi"
- 2005 "Nikad nismo bolje pili"

Pitomača

- 1998 "Prve ljubavi"
- 1999 "Kuca srce Slavonije"
- 2000 "Samo pjevaj"
- 2001 "Bećarska krv"
- 2002 "Baranjska rujna zoro"
- 2004 "Pala Drava Dunavu u zagrljaj"
- 2005 "Zavirih ja u tvoje srdašce"
- 2007 "Bećarski život"
- 2009 "Teci, Dravo"

=== Studio "Emaus" ===
==== Albums ====
- 2011 "Izbroj darove" – EPC Radosna Vijest choir, Osijek (Publisher: "Izvori" – Christian publishing house, Osijek; Music production: Studio Emaus; Music producer: Igor Milić)
- 2012 "Na putu svetosti" – Sanctus (Publisher: Franciscan monastery, Našice; Music production and mastering: Studio Emaus; Music producer: Igor Milić; executive producer: Judita Paljević)
- 2014/2015 "Radost s neba" – Rijeka života, Belišće (Publisher: "Izvori" – Christian publishing house, Osijek; Music production: Studio Emaus; Music producer: Igor Milić)

==== Festivals ====
- Musical festival "Pjesme podravine i podravlja", Pitomača 2009, Slavonski Bećari "Teci Dravo" – Music producer Igor Milić
- Slavonski Bećari "Srce Valpovštine" – Music producer Igor Milić

Bonofest (Publisher: Saint Filip and Jakov district, Vukovar; Editor: Fr. Ivica Jagodić)

- 2010 Mirjam Vida Blagojević: "Molitvom tebe zovem" (I. Milić, D. Magušić, I. Milić) – Music producer Igor Milić
- 2010 Zoran Hornjak: "Put kojim je prošao Bog" (Z. Hornjak, Z, Hornjak, Z. Hornjak/S. Batorek) – Sound recordist Igor Milić

Krapinafest (Publisher: Kajscena; Editor: Boris Pavleković)

- 2012 Mirjam Vida Blagojević: "Agonija" (V. Lustig, V. Lustig, I.Milić) – Music producer Igor Milić
- 2012 Maja Varga: "Svet je Gospod" (M. Varga, M. Varga, I. Milić) – Music producer Igor Milic
- 2012 Zoran Hornjak: "Budi uvijek uz mene" (Z. Hornjak, Z. Hornjak, I. Milic) – Music producer Igor Milić
- 2013 Sanctus: "Ja ljubim Jahvu" (J. Paljevic) – Music producer Igor Milić
- 2013 Maja Varga: "Na tvojim oltarima" (M. Varga, M. Varga, I. Milić) – Music producer Igor Milić

Spiritual Music Festival "Svjetlost dolazi", Zadar

- 2013 Zoran Hornjak: "Vjera" (Z. Hornjak) – Music producer Igor Milić

==== Others ====
- 2012 Children's evangelical performance "Puzzle" – Music producer Igor Milić
- 2013 Musical "Les Miserables" – Music producer Igor Milić

==== Phonographic cooperation ====
- 2009 Album "Šarengrad" – Krle i Inspektori (back vocal and bass guitar)
