= Gledajući u mrak =

Studio album by Džukele
- Released: 1994
- Recorded: November 1993; Do-Re-Mi studio, Novi Sad
- Genre: Punk rock Garage rock Alternative rock Rock
- Length: 34:57
- Label: Metropolis Records; CD 004
- Producer: Džukele; Nenad Drašković

Džukele chronology
Gledajući u mrak (1994)	Zubato Sunce (1998)

Professional ratings
Review scores
Source	Rating
Ritam	4/5 stars

Gledajući u mrak (Looking Into The Darkness) is the debut album by the Serbian rock band Džukele, released by Metropolis Records in 1994.

== Track listing ==
Lyrics by Slobodan Vukosavljević, music by Džukele, except for track 4, written by Sting.

No.	Title	Length
1.	"Most" (The Bridge)	4:12
2.	"Umoran od tebe" (Tired of You)	3:00
3.	"Sve je propalo zbog vas" (Everything Is Ruined Because Of You)	3:18
4.	"Opasan grad" (Dangerous Town, The Police cover)	2:14
5.	"Amerika" (America)	3:05
6.	"Energija" (Energy)	2:53
7.	"Miris novog vremena" (Scent of the New Age)	3:28
8.	"Čovek u odelu od zlata" (The Man In a Suit Of Gold)	3:56
9.	"Ne mogu da pobegnem" (I Cannot Escape)	4:55
10.	"Kraj" (The End)	3:56

== Personnel ==
- Leo fon Punkerstein (artwork by [design])
- Dragan Neorčić "Draža" (bass)
- Rudolf Aleksić "Rudi" (drums)
- Nenad Drašković (executive producer)
- Leonid Pilipović "Leo" (guitar, vocals)
- Slobodan Vukosavljević "Bane" (lyrics by, vocals, guitar)
- Željko Vukelić (photography [front])
- Silvija Aleksić (photography [inside])
- Aleksandar Stamenković (recorded by)
- Predrag Pejić (recorded by)
