= Mario Mihaljević =

Croatian musician, journalist, and writer

- Born: Mario Mihaljević; 1951 (age 74–75); PR Bosnia and Herzegovina, FPR Yugoslavia
- Occupations: Musician, journalist, novelist, radio editor
- Years active: 1970s–present
- Awards: Split Award

Mario Mihaljević (born 1951) is a Croatian musician, lyricist, journalist, columnist and a poem-writer, radio-editor. He has created "legendary" shows such as Crvena jabuka and Zeleni megaherc among others. During his almost 50-year long career, Mihaljević has worked on numerous songs, including the Yugoslav entry in the Eurovision Song Contest 1983, performed in Croatian by Montenegrin singer Daniel Popović which achieved the fourth place.

== Life and career ==
He is the son of father Branko Mihaljević, a Croatian musician, writer, journalist and radio editor. He has one son, Branimir Mihaljević who works as an arranger, producer, singer and musician.

Mihaljević has lived in Zagreb and Rijeka. As of 2023, he is working on the biography of the Yugoslav pop band Novi fosili. His career has lasted for longer than 50 years. He has additionally published work under the pseudonym Branimir Mursini under which he has sent a song to the Belgrade Spring festival and worked anonymously from his father. At the time, he received the third award for his entry.

On 3 March 2023, Mihaljević was a guest on the talk show 5.com s Danielom on HRT together with Matija Cvek. During the show, he gave an interview together with the other guest in which he gave an introspective view of his career.

=== Songwriting work ===
His most famous work include the lyrics for the song "Džuli" with which Danijel Popović won the 4th place at Eurovision Song Contest 1989 and "Hrvatine" performed by Đuka Čaić. He has additionally written lyrics for songs of numerous Croatian artists, including Mišo Kovač and Krunoslav Slabinac. He has written the song "Vrati se s kišom" by Neda Ukraden and the music for Slavonske Lole.

In 2009, he suggested that the cult child song "Zeko i potočić" written by his father receives a monument at the "Trg bana Jelačića", in front of the children theater. He has also directed a brief, 4:30-long cartoon for the song.

He has also written a song titled "Mario" which is dedicated to himself. In 2019, he modified the lyrics of "Hrvatine", this time naming it "Hrvatine 2", which he published in 2019, inspired by Croatian politics and the political situation in the wider region. That same year, he published the song "Oprostite, meni se ne slavi" in which he offered resistance to the celebration of Operation Storm in Croatia and quite vocally condemned it as a "fake celebration"; his poem was first shared by Kurir and then all media in Serbia and Bosnia and Herzegovina.

=== Work in politics ===
He has briefly ventured in politics during the 1990s, for the political parties Croatian Democratic Union and Croatian Party of Rights. He left the former party in the 2010s.

== Awards and nominations ==
He received an award at the 2022 Split Awards for "Kad se rodiš usrid Splita" performed by Luka Nižetić.

== Private life ==
Mihajlević has briefly discussed his spiritual life in an interview in 2012, saying that he managed to "find himself" at 41 only after he realized that his life is at stake during his home country's war. He came up with the idea of following the religion of the church of universal life with a seat in California. He titled his subdivision "amorizam" and gave himself the spiritual name of Amior. In the church, that he had been a priest in for 8 years by the time of the interview, he wanted to get rid of hierarchies and only keep the one where people can be ranked by their age. He also shared the view that he would officially register same-sex marriages in his church. By 2013, he revealed that he officialized 11 same-sex marriages, of which 8 were of lesbian pairs and 3 of gay pairs. He revealed that he got contacted by the spouses through Twitter or the Internet website of the church.

During an interview, he revealed that he has a fear of dentists.
