= Dalibor Brun =

Croatian singer (1944–2026)

- Born: 19 September 1944; Sisak, PR Croatia, FPR Yugoslavia
- Died: 23 January 2026 (aged 81)
- Occupation: Singer
- Formerly of: Uragani; Korni Grupa

Dalibor Brun (19 September 1944 – 23 January 2026) was a Croatian singer who rose to prominence with his work in Yugoslav music acts Uragani and Korni Grupa, before going on to maintain a successful solo career beginning in 1969.

Brun was an eminent Croatian musician whose songs blended modern pop with the chanson genre.

He had participated three times in the annual Split Festival ("Lipa luna", 1975; "Ja te ljubim", 1976; "Uspavanka", 1983), three times in the Zagreb Festival ("Miruj, miruj, srce", 1972; "Otkad si tuđa žena", 1973; "I poveo sam je u travu", 1975) and twice in the Opatija festival ("Ruže", 1975; "Ne pitaj me zašto", 1976). He also took part in the Croatian Band Aid, and provided vocals for the Croatian patriotic song "Moja domovina" (1991).

Brun died on 23 January 2026, at the age of 81.

== Discography ==
- Prolaze godine/Tvoje plave oči, Liza, 1969
- Ovaj život s tobom/Za tebe, 1970
- Djeca ljubavi/Uvek ću ostati tvoj, 1970
- Kidajmo lance ljubavi/Marie, 1971
- Spavaj pored mene/Noći pune tebe, 1971
- Zašto me ostavljaš?/Moja, moja, 1972
- Miruj, miruj, srce/Nema više ljubavi, 1972
- Suze, suze/Ekstaza, 1972
- Nevjerna je ona bila/Bit ću s tobom, 1973
- Voljenoj, 1973
- Otkad si tuđa žena/Što želiš od mene, 1973
- Tiha tugo moja/Željena, 1974
- Ponovo na poznatom putu, 1974
- Živi kako hoćeš/Kuca li srce zbog mene, 1974
- I poveo sam je u travu/Voliš li - čekaj me, 1975
- Lipa luna/Ti si žena, 1975
- Ruže/Nedaj, nedaj moja ljubavi, 1975
- Ja te ljubim/Proljetna pjesma, 1976
- Ne pitaj me zašto/Moj bolni krvav cvijet, 1976
- Poludjela ptica, 1976
- Zaboravit ću tebe/Dok smo zajedno bili, 1977
- Nosio sam cvijeće pod prozore/Kad ti jednom bude dosta, 1977
- Pozdravimo se, 1993
- Sve najbolje od Dalibora Bruna, 1995
- Ranjena duša, 1996
- Zašto me zoveš, 1998
- Živim, kako znam, kako mogu, 2000
- Nema spavanja, 2008
- Megamix br. 1
- Megamix br. 2
