= Dinamiti =

Yugoslav rock band

- Dinamiti in 1969, from left to right: Dado Topić, Josip Boček, Alberto Krasnići, Ratko Divjak

Background information
- Origin: Osijek, SR Croatia, SFR Yugoslavia
- Genres: Rock; beat music; rhythm and blues; folk rock; progressive rock
- Years active: 1963-1969
- Labels: Komuna, Croatia Records
- Past members: Krunoslav Slabinac; Antun Nikolić; Alberto Krasnići; Miroslav Šaranović; Vladimir Lazić; Ratomir Divjak; Dado Topić; Josip Boček

Dinamiti (trans. The Dynamites) were a Yugoslav rock band formed in Osijek in 1963. They were one of the pioneers of the Yugoslav rock scene.

Dinamiti were formed in 1963 by Krunoslav "Kićo" Slabinac (vocals, rhythm guitar), Antun "Tuca" Nikolić (guitar), Alberto Krasnići (bass guitar), Miroslav Šaranović (drums) and Vladimir Lazić (organ), Šaranović soon being replaced by Ratomir "Ratko" Divjak. The band performed covers, attracting large attention of the audience and the media, gaining the reputation of competent instrumentalists. After Slabinac, Nikolić and Lazić left the band, Krasnići and Divjak were joined by vocalist Dado Topić and guitarist Josip Boček. The band continued to perform covers, but also started to move towards progressive rock with Topić's compositions and their jazz-influenced improvisations. The band disbanded in 1969, after Topić and Boček moved to Korni Grupa.

After leaving Dinamiti, Slabinac achieved large success as a solo artist, becoming one of the most notable acts of the 1970s Yugoslav pop scene. Topić and Boček achieved nationwide popularity with Korni Grupa, before Topić left the band in 1971 to form Time, also a highly successful act on the Yugoslav rock scene. Divjak dedicated himself to jazz, performing as a member of numerous jazz and jazz fusion ensembles.

== History ==
=== 1963–1969 ===
Dinamiti's history begins in 1961, when vocalist and rhythm guitarist Krunoslav "Kićo" Slabinac formed the band Tornado in Osijek. In 1962 the group changed the name to Kon-Tiki, and in 1963 started working under the name Dinamiti. The first Dinamiti lineup featured, beside Slabinac, Antun "Tuca" Nikolić (guitar), Alberto Krasnići (bass guitar), Miroslav Šaranović (drums) and Vladimir Lazić (organ). Soon after the group started performing as Dinamiti, Šaranović moved to the band Indexi, and was replaced by Ratomir "Ratko" Divjak.

The band performed mostly at dances, gaining attention of the audience as a cover act. For a period of time, they held regular concerts in Zagreb's Workers' Hall, performing four to five times a week, with 1,200 to 1,500 people attending each of these performances. They performed diverse material, from jazz and contemporary rock hits to schlagers, gaining reputation as competent instrumentalists. The band made some recordings on reel-to-reel tape recorder, and these songs were often played on Radio Osijek and in Osijek cinemas.

In 1966, Dinamiti performed on the first edition of Belgrade Gitarijada festival, winning the seventh place. In 1967, they performed on the second edition of Belgrade Gitarijada, reaching the festival's semi-finals, and won the first place at Zagreb Gitarijada festival, after which they went to Germany, where they performed in the clubs P.N. Hit House and Havana Beat Center in Munich. However, after only several weeks, they had to return to Yugoslavia, as both Slabinac and Nikolić were drafted to serve their mandatory stint in the Yugoslav Army. The band continued their activity after Slabinac's and Nikolić's return from the army, achieving local success with the song "Plavuša" ("Blonde Girl"), written by Stevo Radović of the band Bele Višnje, with whom Slabinac served his army stint in Titograd. However, at the time Slabinac fell in love with the daughter of the Colorado Circus owner, so together with Nikolić and Lazić he started playing in the circus orchestra. While the circus performed in Belgrade, Slabinac and the girl broke up, so the three musicians left the orchestra. In order to earn some money quickly, they formed the band Vizije (The Visions) with two Belgrade musicians, brothers Toma and Miodrag Milanović, for a period of time holding regular concerts in Belgrade Youth Center.

After Slabinac, Nikolić and Lazić left the band, Krasnići and Divjak invited vocalist Dado Topić and guitarist Josip Boček, at the time members of the band Đavolji Eliksiri (The Devil's Elixirs), to join them. The new incarnation of Dinamiti became a live attraction, thanks to their performances based on improvisations and covers of works by foreign progressive rock acts. The band also performed some of Topić's compositions, like "Novine" ("Newspapers") and "Život moj" ("My Life"), which were in accordance with the emerging trends on the Yugoslav rock scene and were well received by the audience. This lineup of the band won the first place at the Zagreb Gitarijada festival, the Golden Guitar Award and the Audience Award at the Belgrade Beat Festival and performed on Radio Belgrade on several occasions. The band's work, especially Topić's vocal skills, was widely praised by the Yugoslav press. They made some recordings, but never released any of them.

In 1969 the band moved to Zagreb, where they performed mostly in the clubs Kulušić and Lola. In the summer of 1969 they held a large Adriatic coast tour, with Josipa Lisac and Alenka Pinterič as guest vocalists. The band attracted new attention of the press after German string instrument manufacturing company Framus gifted them an electric guitar. However, despite the attention of the audience and praises by the music press, Dinamiti ended their activity at the end of 1969, as Topić moved to Korni Grupa, where he was soon joined by Boček.

=== Post breakup ===
After he ended his activity with Vizije, Slabinac started a career as a solo singer, achieving huge success on the Yugoslav pop scene. He died on 13 November 2020. With Korni Grupa Topić and Boček achieved nationwide success. In 1971 Topić left Korni Grupa and formed highly successful band Time. Divjak dedicated himself to jazz music, studying at the University of Music and Performing Arts Graz and playing in various ensembles, including Time and the successful jazz rock band September. Alberto Krasnići wrote several songs for the Osijek band Had (Hades), released on the band's 7-inch singles.

In 1994, the recordings of the songs "Čačak kolo" and "Čađava mehana" ("Dusty Tavern"), both covers of traditional songs, were released on the Komuna compilation albums U mojim venama: Etno rock (In My Veins: Ethnic Rock) and Sjaj izgubljene ljubavi: Muzika šezdesetih (Spark of the Lost Love: Music of the Sixties) respectively, as a part of the YU retROCKspektiva (YU RetROCKspective) album series. The recordings "Tema za bossa novu" ("Bossa Nova Theme") and "Crying Time" (a cover of Ray Charles song) were published on the box set Kad je rock bio mlad - Priče sa istočne strane (1956-1970) (When Rock Was Young - East Side Stories (1956-1970)), released by Croatia Records in 2005 and featuring songs by the pioneering Yugoslav rock acts.

== Discography ==
=== Compilation appearances ===
- "Čačak kolo" (U mojim venama: Etno rock, 1994)
- "Čađava mehana" (Sjaj izgubljene ljubavi: Muzika šezdesetih, 1994)
- "Tema za bossa novu" / "Crying Time" (Kad je rock bio mlad - Priče sa istočne strane (1956-1970), 2005)
