= Bele Vrane =

Yugoslav rock band

- Bele Vrane in 1968

Background information
- Origin: Ljubljana, SR Slovenia, SFR Yugoslavia
- Genres: Beat music; pop rock
- Years active: 1966-1973
- Labels: PGP-RTB, Helidon, Jugoton, ZKP RTVS
- Past members: Sonja Pahor; Doca Marolt; Bor Gostiša; Tadej Hrušovar; Đuro Penzeš; Vanja Repinc; Bojan Bračko; Ditka Haberl; Ivo Umek; Iztok Pečar; Mišo Gregorin

Bele Vrane (trans. The White Crows) were a Yugoslav rock band formed in Ljubljana in 1966.

Soon after the formation, the band gained the attention of the media with their The Mamas & the Papas-influenced sound. Bele Vrane had success on Yugoslav pop festivals and their releases were praised by the media, the group becoming one of the most popular Yugoslav bands of the 1960s. They ended their activity in 1973, after releasing an album, two EPs and several 7-inch singles. Although they were not among the earliest Yugoslav rock bands, Bele Vrane, as other Yugoslav 1960s rock bands, played a pioneering role on the Yugoslav rock scene.

== History ==
=== 1966-1973 ===
Bele Vrane were formed in Ljubljana in 1966. The band's first lineup consisted of female vocalists Sonja Pahor and Doca Marolt, guitarist Bor Gostiša (who previously performed in the band Albatrosi), vocalist and guitarist Tadej Hrušovar (formerly of the band Fellows), bass guitarist Đuro Penzeš, organist Vanja Repinc and drummer Bojan Bračko. The band soon gained attention of the public with their The Mamas & the Papas-influenced polyphonic singing. By the end of 1967, the band's most notable lineup was formed. It featured Ditka Haberl (vocals, formerly of The Chains), Doca Marolt (vocals), Tadej Hrušovar (vocals, guitar), Bor Gostiša (guitar), Đuro Penzeš (bass guitar), Ivo Umek (keyboards) and Bojan Bračko (drums). Later lineups of the band included guitarist Iztok Pečar and drummer Mišo Gregorin. The band introduced themselves to wide audience on 7 December 1967, when they performed on the Najfotogeničnija Slovenka (The Most Photogenic Slovenian Girl) contest.

In 1968, the band competed in the first Slovenian Guitar Festival. They were among 21 bands which performed on the festival, entering the finals and winning the first place. Soon after, the band released their debut record, the EP Presenčenja (Surprises). The EP featured two of the band's own songs, "Presenečenja" and "Eskalacija" ("Escalation"), both co-written by Hrušovar and Jure Robežnik, and two covers of the songs by The Mamas & the Papas, "Hey Girl" and "Twelve Thirty". The EP was praised by the Yugoslav press and the title track became a nationwide hit. In 1968, the band also performed at the Opatija Festival, winning the First Prize with the song "Mesto mladih" ("A Place of Youth"). As this was one of the first cases of a rock band winning a prize at a pop festival in Yugoslavia, one part of the press described Bele Vrane's success on the festival as a scandal. The song was published on the band's second EP as the title track. The EP also featured the songs "Običajno popoldne" ("Common Afternoon"), "Spomin" ("Memory") and "Mi mladi" ("We the Young"). At the end of 1968, they held a concert in Belgrade Youth Center, which saw large attention of the media.

During 1969, the band performed mostly in SR Serbia, but in the summer they performed in Trieste, in Paradiso Hall, under the Italian name Aquile Bianche (The White Eagles). At the 1969 Subotica Youth Festival, the band won the First Prize with the song "Jesen na njenom dlanu" ("Autumn on the Palm of Her Hand"). They also had success with the song "Veseli vrtuljak" ("Merry Carousel"), which they performed at the 1969 Zagreb Music Festival. On the same festival, they performed as the backing band for singer Beti Jurković in the song "Ljubav stvara čuda" ("Love Creates Miracles"). The song "Veseli vrtuljak" was released on a 7-inch single with the song "Godišnjica" ("Anniversary") as the B-side. On the 1969 Vaš šlager sezone (Your Schlager of the Season) festival, they performed the song "Daj da se učini nešto" ("Let's Do Something"), which was published on the Jugoton various artists EP Vaš šlager sezone 69. During 1969 the band also participated on the Slovenska popevka festival, and their songs "Na vrhu nebotičnika" ("At the Top of The Skyscrapers"), featuring lyrics written by poet and playwright Gregor Strniša, and "Maček v žaklju" ("Cat in the Bag") were released on the festival official album Slovenska popevka. In 1970 the band released the single with the songs "Skrivnostna pesem" ("The Hidden Song") and "Hvala vam za vse" ("Thank You for Everything") and their song "Mini-maxi" was released on the split single with Sonja Gabršček's song "Iščemo očka" ("We're Looking for Dad").

In 1971, the band released the album Bele Vrane, on audio cassette only. The album featured songs originally released on their 7-inch singles and performed on festivals, with the addition of three covers – Mary Hopkin's "Those Were the Days", entitled "Bili so dnevi", Bob Dylan and The Band's "This Wheel's on Fire", entitled "Ognjena kolesa", and Jefferson Airplane's "3/5 of a Mile in 10 Seconds", entitled "1,5–3,5 milje v deset sekundah". During the same year, the band returned to Slovenska popevka, performing the song "Ženitovanjska", the song being published on the festival official album. The band appeared on the festival for the third and the last time in 1973, with the song "Letalovlak" ("Airtrain"). Soon after the performance, the group their activity.

=== Post-breakup ===
After Bele Vrane ended their activity, Ditka Haberl and Tadej Hrušovar started the successful band Pepel In Kri in 1974. The group represented Yugoslavia at the 1975 Eurovision Song Contest. Hrušovar composed several hundred songs for different artists, most prominently the band Hazard. He died of complications caused by COVID-19 on 5 December 2020. As a solo artist, Haberl released a number of 7-inch singles, the 1979 studio album Zaljubljena (In Love) and the 2009 compilation album Vse je igra (Everything Is a Game).

Following the disbandment of Bele Vrane, Đuro Penzeš and Ivo Umek formed the instrumental rock band Črne Vrane (Black Crows), Doca Marolt occasionally performing with them. Umek later moved to the band Šok (Shock), eventually retiring from music. He worked as an editor on Radio Television Ljubljana and later as an architect. Penzeš performed with the New Swing Quartet. Bor Gostiša continued his career as a solo artist, recording several 7-inch singles.

The song "Presenečenja" was released in 1994 on the Komuna compilation album Sjaj izgubljene ljubavi: Muzika šezdesetih (Spark of the Lost Love: Music of the Sixties) as a part of the YU retROCKspektiva (YU RetROCKspective) album series.

In 1997, the compilation album Bele Vrane was released. Alongside the band's greatest hits, the compilation included previously unreleased covers of The Mamas & the Papas songs "California Dreamin'", entitled "Sanje o Kaliforniji" and "My Girl", entitled "Moje dekle", cover of Cream song "Sunshine of Your Love", entitled "Žarek tvoje ljubezni", cover of Brotherhood of Man song "Where Are You Going to My Love", entitled "Kam si namenjen", and the cover of the song "Let the Sunshine In" from the musical Hair, entitled "Naj sije sonce".

== Legacy ==
The band's song "Na vrhu nebotčnika" was covered by Slovenian rock band U' Redu (All Right) on their 1992 album Let's Dance!. The song "Maček v žaklju" was covered by Croatian and Yugoslav alternative rock band Let 3 on their 2000 album Jedina (Only One).

== Discography ==
=== Studio albums ===
- Bele Vrane (1971)

=== EPs ===
- Presenečenja (1968)
- Mesto mladih (1969)

=== Compilations ===
- Bele Vrane (1997)

=== Singles ===
- "Veseli vrtuljak" / "Godišnjica" (1969)
- "Skrivnostna pesem" / "Hvala vam za vse" (1970)
- "Iščemo očka" / "Mini-maxi" (Spit single with Sonja Gabršček; 1970)
- "Kam si namenjen" / "Od srca do srca" (1971)

=== Other appearances ===
- "Ljubav stvara čuda" (Zageb 69)
- "Daj da se učini nešto" (Vaš šlager sezone; 1969)
- "Na vrhu nebotičnika" / "Maček v žaklju" (Slovenska popevka; 1969)
- "Ženitovanjska" (Slovenska popevka; 1971)
