= Gregor Strniša =

Slovenian writer (1930–1987)

- Born: 18 November 1930; Ljubljana, Drava Banovina, Kingdom of Yugoslavia (now in Slovenia)
- Died: 23 January 1987 (aged 56); Ljubljana, SR Slovenia, SFR Yugoslavia
- Occupations: Poet, Playwright, Songwriter
- Writing career
- Notable work: Samorog (Unicorn)

Gregor Strniša (18 November 1930 – 23 January 1987) was a Slovenian poet, playwright, and songwriter. He is considered one of the most important Slovene-language poet of the second half of the 20th century. He spent most of his life away from public light, and has gained widespread recognition only after his death.

== Life ==
Strniša was born in Ljubljana, Slovenia, then part of the Kingdom of Yugoslavia, to his father Gustav Strniša (1887–1970), himself a young adult fiction writer, and mother Alojzija, as their fourth child.

He was accused together with his parents, who were involved in helping Slovene political emigrants across the border to the West, of "organizing an underground anti-Communist opposition and of revealing state secrets" by the Titoist regime and was in 1949 sentenced to four years in prison, but was released after two years on probation while a high school student at the Classical Grammar School of Ljubljana.

He went on to study languages at the University of Ljubljana where he got his diploma in 1961 after studying the German and English languages. During his study he also attended classes in ancient languages and learned Hebrew, and the basics of Sumerian and Akkadian. As a co-founder of the alternative journal Revija 57, he joined young Slovene intellectuals and dissidents challenging the cultural policies of the Titoist regime.

Strniša was known for never having moved from his native Ljubljana, except for a few short trips across Yugoslavia. In 1985, he was granted a Fulbright Scholarship to travel to the United States, but decided to stay in Slovenia.

In 1963, he met the young poet Svetlana Makarovič, with whom he had a short romantic relationship. In 1970 he met Thea Skinder. They married in 1974 and had one daughter.

He died in Ljubljana in 1987, and was buried in Žale Central Cemetery.

== Work ==
=== Poetry and plays ===
Strniša is most renowned for his poetry, based on a highly metaphysical poetic view, and his poetic plays.

His poems express a cosmogony directed against the anthropocentrism of traditional literature. His poems, exploring multiple universes, interconnected through a mysterious and magical fate, have been translated into English, French, Italian, Spanish, German, Greek, Russian, Belarusian, Czech, Polish, Croatian, Hungarian, Romanian, Slovak, Albanian, Turkish and Esperanto. His most well known plays include Samorog (Unicorn) and Žabe (Frogs) which were translated into Serbian, and Ljudožerci (Cannibals) which was translated into German. In 1986, he received the Prešeren Award, the highest prize for literary achievements in Slovenia. His work has been examined by 26 university diploma theses.

=== Songwriting ===
After graduation in 1961, he mostly made his living as a songwriter, writing the lyrics for a number of Slovenian pop songs, including the 1962 song "The Earth is Dancing," which won an award at the first Slovenian song festival. Despite it, he considered songwriting a degradation compared to writing poetry.
