= Zlatko Pejaković =

Croatian singer

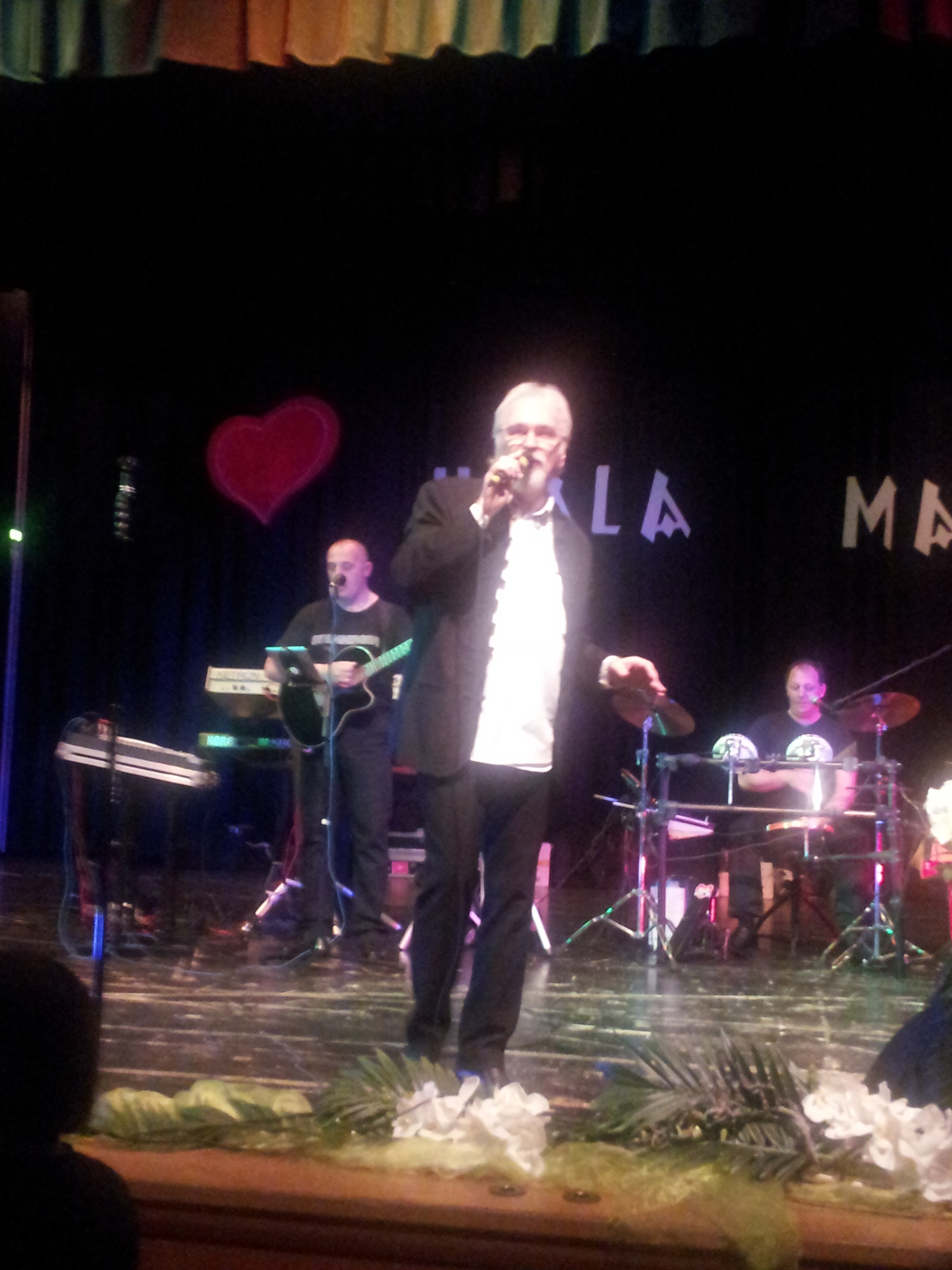
- Pejaković in 2013.

Background information
- Born: 29 August 1950 (age 75); Osijek, PR Croatia, FPR Yugoslavia
- Genres: Pop; rock; folk
- Years active: 1967–present
- Label: Hit Records
- Formerly of: Čarobnjaci; Lavine; Dinamiti; Zlatni Akordi; Grupa Had; Korni Grupa

Zlatko Pejaković (born 29 August 1950) is a Croatian singer. He has released 27 albums over his five decade long career. He started his music career in 1967 with local bands in Osijek. In 1972, he joined Korni Grupa, who in turn reached their peak with Pejaković as their lead singer. The breakup of the band in 1974 kickstarted his solo career.

== Biography ==
Pejaković was born in Osijek to Mihael and Marija Pejaković, Bosnian Croats from Travnik. He sang in bands Čarobnjaci, Lavine, Dinamiti, Zlatni Akordi, Grupa Had and Korni Grupa. His songs include "Ove noći jedna žena", "Lagala je da me voli", and the country-influenced "Plavo pismo".

== Personal life ==
In 1996 he married his longtime girlfriend Marija, who is also a musician. His cousin, Josip Pejaković, was a Bosnian actor, and his son Marko is a DJ in Slovenia. His daughter Marija published her first children's book in 2024.

== Discography ==
=== Solo albums ===
- Lice (1976)
- Zlatko Pejaković (1977)
- Tebi ljubavi (1978)
- Dilema (1979)
- Ti nisi ta (1980)
- Trn (1981)
- Smiri se srce (1982)
- Sve je u redu (1983)
- Zlatko Pejaković (1989)
- Kad prođe sve (1990)
- Tamburicu ja, mandolinu ti (1993)
- Zlatko '93 (1993)
- Zlatko '94 (1994)
- U se, na se... zna se (1995)
- Večeras će zvoniti zvona - Čestit Božić (1995)
- Sve najbolje (1996)
- Best of 69/96 (1996)
- Ni na nebu ni na zemlji (1997)
- Koncert Dom Sportova, Zagreb '98 (1998)
- Zlatko 2000 (2000)
- Pijem da je zaboravim (2001)
- Bezobrazno zelene (2002)
- U ranu zoru (2003)
- Zlatko 2004 (2004)
- Ala je divan taj podravski kraj (2006)
- Pjevat će Slavonija (2006)
- Ličanin sam, govor me odaje (2007)
- The platinum collection (2007)
- Zlatko 2010 (2010)
- Zlatko 2018 (2018)
