= Irena Kohont =

Slovenian singer

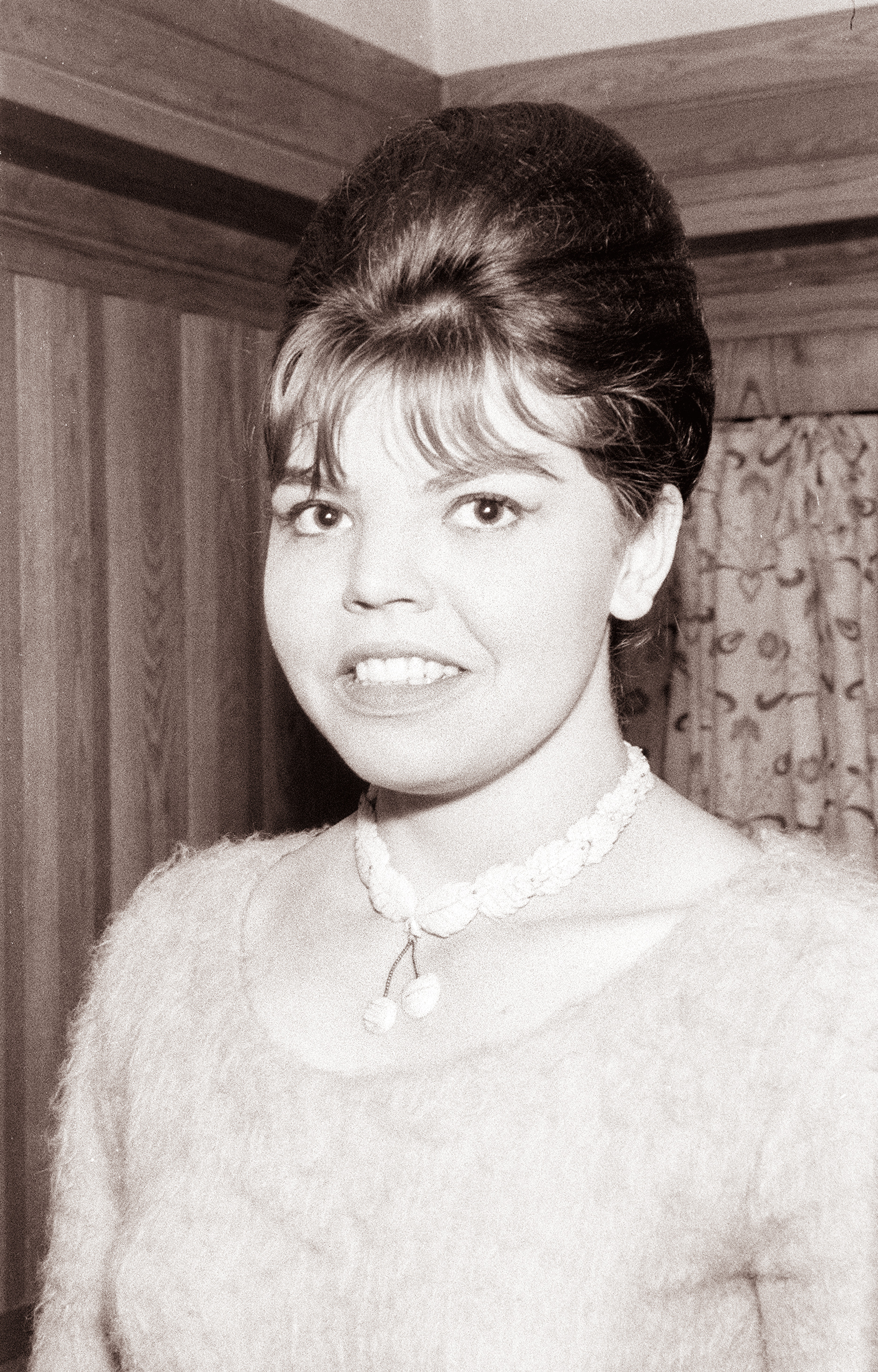
Irena Kohont in 1962

Irena Kohont is Slovenian singer, especially well known in late 1960s and early 1970s.

In 1965, she won Slovenian most successful competition, Slovenska popevka with song "Šel si mimo" (You walked away). Some other well-known songs of Irena were Mamaluk, To so bili dnevi, Povabi me na luno kdaj,...
