= Zubato Sunce =

Gledajući u mrak

Studio album by Džukele
- Released: 1998
- Recorded: September–October 1997; Radio Novi Sad M studio, Novi Sad & Metro studio, Ljubljana
- Genres: Punk rock Garage rock Alternative rock Rock
- Length: 39:32
- Labels: Metropolis Records; MCD 013
- Producers: Janez Križaj, Jan Šaš, Nenad Drašković, Džukele

Džukele chronology
Gledajući u mrak (1994)	Gledajući u mrak (1998)

Zubato Sunce (Toothed Sunbeam) is the second and last studio album by the Serbian rock band Džukele, released by Metropolis Records in 1998. As backing vocalists on the album appeared Atheist Rap, Goblini, and Generacija Bez Budućnosti members.

== Track listing ==
All lyrics by Slobodan Vukosavljević "Bane" except for track 5, written by Nenad Drašković. All music written by Džukele.

No.	Title	Length
1.	"Mi" (We)	4:13
2.	"Linije" (Lines)	3:39
3.	"Lud" (Mad)	4:06
4.	"Kockam se sa tobom" (I Am Gambling With You)	3:33
5.	"Sećanja" (Memories)	5:26
6.	"Igla" (Needle)	2:02
7.	"Pijani glasnik" (Drunk Messenger)	3:09
8.	"San" (The Dream)	4:48
9.	"Osim ljubavi" (Except For Love)	5:07
10.	"Velika svetla" (Big Lights)	3:29

== Personnel ==
- Leo fon Punkerstein (Artwork By [Design])
- "Draža" (Dragan Neorčić; bass)
- Prndža (Vladimir Šarčević; drums)
- Nenad Drašković (executive producer, lyrics by [track 5])
- Leo (Leonid Pilipović; guitar, vocals)
- Janez Križaj (mixed by, mastered by, producer)
- Željko Vukelić (photography)
- Jan Šaš (recorded by, producer)
- Bane (Slobodan Vukosavljević; lyrics by, vocals, guitar)
- Slobodan Misailović (cymbaline [track 8])
