= Džukele =

Serbian punk rock band

Background information
- Also known as: Phoenix, Phoenix '39
- Origin: Subotica, Serbia
- Genres: Punk rock, alternative rock, garage rock
- Years active: 1991 – 2002
- Labels: Metropolis Records, Hi-Fi Centar, Komuna Belgrade
- Past members: Dragan Neorčić; Leonid Pilipović; Rudolf Aleksić; Slobodan Vukosavljević; Vladimir Šarčević

Džukele (Serbian Cyrillic: Џукеле; transl. The Curs) were a Serbian punk rock band from Subotica.

== History ==
The band Phoenix was formed in 1991 by Dragan Neorčić (bass guitar), Slobodan Vukosavljević (guitar, vocals), and Rudolf Aleksijević (drums). Together they recorded their first, seven-track demo at the Classic Studio, and a few months later, in February 1992, the band recorded yet another demo, featuring two songs. In April of the same year, former Allegro member Leonid Pilipović, also known as "Leo fon Punkerstein", joined the band and, as Phoenix '39, the band recorded their third demo recording, made in November at the Do-Re-Mi studio in Novi Sad. After the demo recording, the band was renamed to Džukele, and started performing live, including the 1993 Gitarijada festival in Zaječar, which was their first major live appearance, and, during February 1994, at the Brzi Bendovi Srbije Festival, where they were, along with Goblini, pronounced the greatest breakthrough of the year.

The band's debut album Gledajući u mrak (Looking at the Dark), recorded in November 1993 at Do-Re-Mi studio, was released in May 1994 through Metropolis Records. On the album appeared the songs "Most" ("Bridge"), "Amerika" (the United States"), for which the band partially used the lyrics of Azra hit "Pit, i to je Amerika" ("Pete, That Is Also America"), "Energija" ("Energy") and "Ne mogu da pobegnem" ("I Can't Escape"). The album also featured a cover version of The Police hit "Next To You", with lyrics in Serbian entitled "Opasan grad" ("Dangerous Town"). The lyrics for the album were written by Vukosavljević, and the whole band was working on the music writing and album production. The album was promoted until December 1994, when Neorčić and Vukosavljević went to the army and Pilipović joined Goblini.

After a one-year break, in December 1995, the original lineup reunited and, in June 1996, performed at Zgaga Rock festival at Hotič pri Litiji near Ljubljana, Slovenia. After the performance, Aleksijević left the band and was replaced by Marselyeza member Vladimir Šarčević. In the meantime, in April, Metropolis Records reissued Gledajući u mrak on CD. The band also prepared their second album, Zubato Sunce (Toothed Sunbeam), recorded during September and October 1997. The album, produced by the band themselves with the help of Nenad Drašković and former Videosex member Janez Križaj, featured ten songs and guest appearances by Atheist Rap, Goblini and Generacija Bez Budućnosti members on backing vocals. The track "San" ("A Dream") featured cello, played by Slobodan Misailović, and the track "Sećanja" ("Memories") was written by Nenad Drašković. The album artwork, like on the previous album, was done by Pilipović.

The band's song "Umoran od tebe" ("Tiered of You"), originally released on the debut album, appeared on the Metropolis Records 1996 various artists compilation Ustani i kreni (Stand Up and Go), and, during the same year, their song "Amerika" appeared on the Kurvini sinovi: Protestne pesme (Sons of Whores: Protest Songs) Komuna Belgrade various artists compilation. Two years later, on October 26, 1998, the band performed at the Belgrade KST and their performance of The Ramones' "Durango 95" and Šarlo Akrobata's "Fenomen" ("Phenomenon") were released on the various artists live album Punk You All, released by Hi-Fi Centar. The band continued their concert activities until they disbanded in 2002. In the meantime, Metropolis Records released the Metropolis vol.1 various artists compilation featuring the band's song "Ne mogu da pobegnem".

== Legacy ==
The lyrics of 3 songs by the band were featured in Petar Janjatović's book Pesme bratstva, detinjstva & potomstva: Antologija ex YU rok poezije 1967 - 2007 (Songs of Brotherhood, Childhood & Offspring: Anthology of Ex YU Rock Poetry 1967 - 2007).

== Discography ==
=== Studio albums ===
- Gledajući u mrak (1994)
- Zubato Sunce (1998)

=== Singles ===
- "Umoran od tebe" (1996)
- "Amerika" (1996)
- "Durango 95" / "Fenomen (Šarlo Akrobata song)" (1998)
- "Ne mogu da pobegnem" (2002)

== See also ==
- Punk rock in Yugoslavia
