= Slavonski bećari =

Croatian tamburitza ensemble

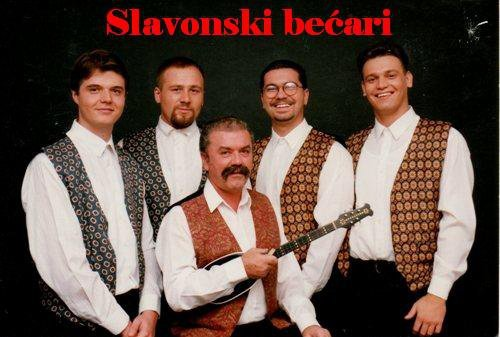
Slavonski Bećari 1997: Boris Kiraly, Igor Milić, Antun Nikolić Tuca, Mario Nikolić, Dalibor Stanarević

Slavonski bećari were a Croatian tamburitza ensemble founded in 1971 by tamburitza player and rock musician Antun Nikolić Tuca. The ensemble continued until 2011.

== History ==
In 1971 from The Big Tamburitza Orchestra of Radio Osijek Antun Nikolić Tuca forms tamburitza band Slavonski bećari, active until 2011. During their forty-year existence they gave many performances, traveled around the world (16 times United States and Canada, 2 times Australia, most European countries). Slavonski Bećari published 4 single and 11 long-play studio albums, 7 compilations, 35 festival records, 532 in HUZIP recorded television performances. They cooperated with many singers from Croatia and other countries, including Miroslav Škoro and Krunoslav Kićo Slabinac, and earned many international and national rewards and prizes.

== Discography ==
=== Albums ===
- 1973. Krunoslav Kićo Slabinac and Slavonski bećari – Bećarac (arranger A. Nikolić)
- 1974. Krunoslav Kićo Slabinac and Slavonski bećari – Kad čujem tambure / Lijepa moja Slavonija (arranger A. Nikolić)
- 1975. Krunoslav Kićo Slabinac, Slavonski bećari and Radio Osijek's Tamburitza Orchestra – Hej, bećari (conductor and arranger A. Nikolić)
- 1979. Krunoslav Kićo Slabinac – Seoska sam lola (arranger A. Nikolić, K. Slabinac)
- 1984. Krunoslav Kićo Slabinac and tamburitza ensemble Slavonski bećari under leadership of Antun Nikolić Tuca – Svatovac / Svi se momci oženiše (arrangers P. Nikolin i A. Nikolić)
- 1982. Ensemble Slavonski Bećari – Hrvatske Božićne pjesme (arranger A. Nikolić)
- 1983. Slavonski bećari and Mirjana Primorac – Ljubila sam crno oko (arranger and music producer A. Nikolić)
- 1985. Fabijan Šovagović and Slavonski Bećari - Pokraj Karašice (music editor and arranger A. Nikolić)
- Šima Jovanovac and Slavonski Bećari – Stari Graničari / Pjevat će Slavonija (arranger A. Nikolić)
- 1986. Slavonski bećari - Zaplešimo uz tambure (music producer and arranger A. Nikolić)
- 1988. Slavonski bećari, Mirjana Primorac, Miroslav Škoro and Zdenko Nikšić (arranger A. Nikolić)
- 1992. Ensemble Antuna Nikolića Tuce Slavonski Bećari – Neće snaša tamburaša (music producer and arranger A. Nikolić)
- 1995. Ensemble Antuna Nikolića Tuce Slavonski Bećari (arranger and author of some songs A. Nikolić)
- 1998. Slavonski bećari – Baš je bila luda godina (arranger and author of some songs A. Nikolić)
- 2003. Slavonski bećari - Narodne Božićne pjesme (arranger A. Nikolić)

=== Compilations ===
- Tamburaški spomenar - 120 original hits; diverse performers (Crne oči dobro vide, Razigrana Šokadija, Snaša, Ej, tamburo, Tebi sam dala sve, Preko Drave skela vozi, Najlipše su cure u Daražu)
- Sretan Božić - 120 original hits; diverse performers (Veselje ti navješćujem)
- Šokačke pisme; diverse performers (Bećarina)
- Zlatna kolekcija - Božić dolazi; diverse performers (Oj, djetešce moje drago)
- Pjevat će Slavonija; diverse performers (Slavonijo)
- Ej, tamburo - sve najbolje 2; diverse performers (Kad čujem tambure)
- Najljepše Božićne pjesme; diverse performers (Tri kralja)

=== Festivals ===
==== "Brodfest" ====
- 1994. – "Za tebe pjevam"
- 1995. - "Pjevaj mi pjevaj, sokole"
- 1996. – "Hrvati će Baranju imati"
- 1997. - "Vukovaru, srećo, dobar dan"
- 1998. – "Sveta Kata, snig za vrata"
- 1999. – "Kućo moja na pol' šora"
- 2000. – "Najlipše su cure u Daražu"
- 2001. – "Dođi, diko, na šokačko sijelo"
- 2003. – "Vatra ivanjska"
- 2004. – "Lovačka himna"
- 2005. – "Ej, ravnico, moja mati"
- 2007. – "Oj, djetešce moje drago"

==== "Zlatne žice Slavonije" Požega ====
- 1992. - "Rastaju se stari tamburaši"
- 1992. - "Snaša"
- 1993. - "Razigrana Šokadija"
- 1994. - "Znam da nisam neki pjesnik"
- 1995. - "Kad bi bila istina"
- 1996. – "Kapo moja poderana"
- 1997. – "Otac mi je stari tamburaš"
- 1998. – "Pokid'o sam na biciklu žbice"
- 2001. – "Da se meni još jedanput roditi"
- 2005. – "Nikad nismo bolje pili"

==== "Pjesme Podravine i Podravlja" Pitomača ====
- 1995. - "Gospa od Aljmaša"
- 1995. - "Podravski zet"
- 1998. – "Prve ljubavi"
- 1999. – "Kuca srce Slavonije"
- 2000. – "Samo pjevaj"
- 2001. – "Bećarska krv"
- 2002. – "Baranjska rujna zoro"
- 2004. – "Pala Drava Dunavu u zagrljaj"
- 2005. – "Zavirih ja u tvoje srdašce"
- 2007. – "Bećarski život"
- 2009. – "Teci, Dravo"
- 2011. - "Preko Drave skela vozi"

==== "Bonofest" ====
- 2009. - "Sveti Antune"

=== List of published songs ===
1. Bećarac; 2. Zora rudi, dan se bijeli; 3. Svi se moji oženiše; 4. Slavonijo, zemljo plemenita; 5. Kad čujem tambure; 6. Lijepa moja Slavonija; 7. Hej, Bećari; 8. Ne plači, draga; 9. Gori lampa na srid Vinkovaca; 10. Crne oči dobro vide; 11. Peče čiča rakiju; 12. Svekrva; 13. Slavonsko kolo; 14. Zora rudi; 15. Tekla voda Karašica; 16. Našim šorom jagodo; 17. Digni, Kajo, kraj od šlingeraja; 18. Vesela je Šokadija; 19. Seoska sam lola; 20. Kiša pada rosna trava; 21. Škripi đeram; 22. Kabanica i šeksera; 23. Oj curice sil dil daj; 24. Tandora; 25. Sinoć bila misečina; 26. Čija frula ovim šorom svira; 27. Golubice bijela; 28. Lipo ti je rano uraniti; 29. Čija kola klepeću sokakom; 30. Alaj volim u kolu igrati	31. Svatovac; 32. Svi se momci oženiše; 33. Pokraj Drave-Ančice bančice; 34. Kad bi ove ruže male; 35. Aoj, nema staze u nasem šljiviku; 36. Da je višnja ko trešnja; 37. Oj, lolo moja; 38. Žalim te, momče; 39. Zavrzanac; 40. Ljubila sam crno oko; 41. I sinoć sam mila majko; 42. Pletenice od uva do uva; 43. Ej, lolo; 44. Procvala je lipa i topola; 45. Meni nana za mog diku brani; 46. Pokraj Karašice; 47. Dunav, Sava, Drava; 48. Ova naša livada; 49. Oj, savice; 50. Golubice bijela; 51. Bećarac; 52. Oj, sokole; 53. Da se povezemo; 54. Predite prelje, vezite velje; 55. Lipu Kaju izvedoše; 56. Stari graničari; 57. Pjevat će Slavonija; 58. Slavonijo; 59. Jedan dan života; 60. Elena	61. Dečko, ajde oladi; 62. Plavi podrum; 63. Hej, momci mladi-Čokolada; 64. Splet valcera; 65. Falile se Kaštelanke-Samoborci; 66. Ljetu je mome kraj; 67. Čekala je majka sina; 68. Bolje biti pijan nego star; 69. Igrajmo Sirtaki; 70. Imam diku; 71. Logovac; 72. Moja tambura; 73. Mjesec lola; 74. Pjevaj m, i sokole; 75. Ni bećari više nisu; 76. Rukavice; 77. Moj labude; 78. Ljiljane moj bijeli; 79. Bila je tako lijepa; 80. Mi imamos mnogos problemos; 81. Laku noć, gitaro; 82. Umire prva ljubav; 83. Snaša; 84. Ej, tamburo; 85. Kad zapivam lagani bećarac; 86. Bećarsko srce; 87. Bećarac; 88. Istinu svijetu o Baranji reci; 89. Ja ću se vratiti; 90. Kormoran	91. Slavonijo, nemoj plakati; 92. Gospa od Aljmaša; 93. Hrvati će Baranju imati; 94. Za tebe pjevam; 95. Moram se vratiti; 96. Dora; 97. Podravski zet; 98. Tebi sam dala sve; 99. Znam da nisam neki pjesnik; 100. Matija birtaš; 101. Ružmarinka; 102. Logovac-kolo; 103. Baš je bila luda godina; 104. Jednoga jutra čim stigo' doma; 105. Željan sam ljubavi; 106. Otac mi je stari tamburaš; 107. Vukovaru, srećo, dobar dan; 108. Kapo moja poderana; 109. Imao sam 7 žena; 110. Gdje je ljubav tu si ti; 111. Podravinu ne diraj; 112. Vidio sam snašu na salašu; 113. Splet kola iz Slavonije; 114. Radujte se, narodi; 115. Svima na zemlji; 116. U to vrijeme godišta; 117. Veselje ti navješćujem; 118. Djetešce nam se rodilo; 119. Oj, djetešce moje drago; 120. O, pastiri čudo novo	121. Tiha noć; 122. Danas se čuje; 123. Sklopi blage očice; 124. Tri kralja; 125. Narodi nam se; 126. Rastaju se stari tamburaši; 127. Razigrana Šokadija; 128. Kad bi bila istina; 129. Pokid'o sam na biciklu žbice; 130. Sveta Kata snig za vrata; 131. Prve ljubavi; 132. Kuco moja na pol' sora; 133. Kuca srce Slavonije; 134. Najlipše su cure u Daražu; 135. Samo pjevaj; 136. Dođi diko na šokačko sijelo; 137. Bećarska krv; 138. Da se meni još jedanput roditi; 139. Baranjska rujna zoro; 140. Vatra ivanjska; 141. Lovačka himna; 142. Pala Drava Dunavu u zagrljaj; 143. Ej, ravnico, moja mati; 144. Zavirih ja u tvoje srdašce; 145. Nikad nismo bolje pili; 146. Bećarski život; 147. Teci, Dravo; 148. Sveti Antune; 149. Srce Valpovštine; 150. Preko Drave skela vozi; 151. Bećarina
