= Korni Grupa =

Yugoslav rock band

- Korni Grupa's final lineup, clockwise: Kornelije Kovač, Bojan Hreljac, Josip Boček, Zlatko Pejaković, and Vladimir Furduj.

Background information
- Also known as: Kornelyans
- Origin: Belgrade, SR Serbia, SFR Yugoslavia
- Genres: Pop rock; progressive rock; folk rock; jazz rock; psychedelic rock; symphonic rock
- Years active: 1968–1974 (Reunions: 1987, 2019)
- Labels: PGP-RTB, Casa Ricordi, Philips Records, Jugoton, Komuna
- Spinoff of: Indexi; Elipse; Zlatni Dečaci; Dinamiti
- Past members: Kornelije Kovač; Bojan Hreljac; Vladimir Furduj; Velibor Kacl; Miroslava Kojadinović; Dušan Prelević; Dalibor Brun; Dado Topić; Josip Boček; Zdravko Čolić; Zlatko Pejaković

Korni Grupa (Serbian Cyrillic: Корни Група, trans. Korni Group) was a Yugoslav rock band formed in Belgrade in 1968. Launched and led by—as well as named after—the keyboardist Kornelije Kovač, the band was one of the first Yugoslav rock acts to achieve major mainstream popularity in the country, and often considered the very first Yugoslav supergroup. Since their dissolution, Korni Grupa gained significant retroactive acclaim as one of the most influential bands in the history of rock music in Yugoslavia. The band additionally used the Kornelyans name during a short-lived commercial foray outside of Yugoslavia in an attempt at breaking into the international market with an English-language album.

All throughout their run, Korni Grupa's activity took place on two parallel tracks: one focused around commercial pop rock in pursuit of mainstream popularity, and the other, an artistically influenced progressive rock sound crossed with influences of psychedelic, folk, jazz, and symphonic rock music. The keyboardist Kornelije Kovač formed the group with the bassist Bojan Hreljac, drummer Vladimir Furduj, and guitarist Velibor Kacl. After going through several vocalists—Miroslava Kojadinović, Dušan Prelević and Dalibor Brun—a period during which Korni Grupa released several singles, the band settled on Dado Topić who brought along his former bandmate Josip Boček as the replacement for Kacl. The lineup with Topić on vocals competed at music festivals, scored a popular film, This Crazy World of Ours, and created a rock epic as a soundtrack for an episode of the Jedan čovek jedna pesma television program that would be released years later on the posthumous studio album 1941. Upon Topić's departure, his substitute was Zdravko Čolić who only lasted six months. Zlatko Pejaković took over the vocals after Čolić left.

With Pejaković, the band recorded their eponymous debut album, which was the very first full-length album by a SR Serbia-based rock band and only the fourth one in Yugoslavia, as well as an English language followup album, Not an Ordinary Life, under the name Kornelyans. The band had also performed at the Eurovision Song Contest 1974 placing in disappointing 12th place, which—along with the second album's poor reception—led to the band's decision to split up. They held two farewell concerts at Novi Sad's Studio M before disbanding on December 1, 1974. A portion of the recordings from the two shows would later be released on the compilation album Mrtvo more, the first double album in the history of Yugoslav rock music.

After the group's disbandment, Korni Grupa members pursued careers as solo acts, studio musicians, and producers, reuniting in 1987 with Topić on vocals for two performances, in Zagreb and Belgrade. In 2019, Kovač, Boček and Topić reunited to hold the farewell Korni Grupa concert in Belgrade; Hreljac's participation in the reunion was also announced, however, he died less than two months before the concert.

== History ==
=== Early years (1968–1969) ===
Having left the Sarajevo-based Indexi in 1968, established keyboardist Kornelije "Bata" Kovač, a graduate of the University of Sarajevo's Music Academy, moved to Yugoslav capital Belgrade. Soon after arrival, he met the bassist Bojan Hreljac, former member of recently-disbanded Elipse, and the two decided to start a brand new band, inviting Hreljac's former Elipse bandmate, drummer Vladimir "Furda" Furduj, and guitarist Velibor "Borko" Kacl formerly of another recently-disbanded major Yugoslav band, Zlatni Dečaci. Newly-established Korni Grupa then completed their lineup with the arrival of the female singer Miroslava "Seka" Kojadinović in September 1968, with the event receiving significant press coverage due to the members being well-known musicians owing to their previous work. In fact, many observers considered the band to be the first supergroup in Yugoslavia.

Their debut live appearance took place at Belgrade's Dom Sindikata (Trade Union Hall) in late 1968 as part of the Yugoslav Athlete of the Year award ceremony. The band's set, performed alongside two go-go dancers, consisted of several original songs written during rehearsals/jam sessions at Hreljac's garage as well as a cover of "If You Go Away" during which they notably utilized pre-recorded sounds of the sea played from a tape recorder placed inside Kovač's piano. The eye-catching performance was received favourably, opening a number of live performance opportunities for the band at numerous venues around town. One such appearance took place at Belgrade's Dom Omladine (Youth Center), where they put on a conceptual multimedia performance, with painter Raša Trkulja painting live during the show. It further featured ballerinas dancing behind multicoloured plastic cylinders blurring their silhouettes, and actors performing sketches such as dusting the piano or The Lady With the Dog sketch (named after a short story by Anton Chekov) in which a lady would walk a man on a leash in the first part of the performance and the man walking the lady in the second part.

The band was soon invited to perform on the Radio Belgrade show Studio VI vam pruža šansu (Studio VI is Offering You a Chance), however, Kojadinović refused to sing, so Kovač had to jump in on short notice to provide the lead vocals. The reason for her refusal was the selection of the songs for the performance, including the song "Marijan", the first song the Kovač had written with the band, which Kojadinović, heavily influenced by the 1960s underground music, especially Julie Driscoll (whose version of "Season of the Witch" the band used to perform at the time), considered overly commercial. Since the rest of the band took Kovač's side, Kojadinović was excluded from the band, after which she started a solo career that would turn out to be short lived, releasing one EP and two 7-inch singles before retiring from music and, after graduating from the University of Belgrade's Faculty of Law, becoming a lawyer.

Dušan "Prele" Prelević, well-known locally in Belgrade for his distinctive rhythm and blues and soul vocal style and excessive lifestyle, became the new Korni Grupa vocalist. In early 1969, the band was invited to compete at the 1969 Jugovizija festival, the selection for the Yugoslav representative at the Eurovision song contest, which entailed coming up with an original number. For the band's entry, despite being heavily influenced by the emerging progressive rock genre, Kovač opted to write a pop-oriented song, "Cigu-ligu" ("Tweedle-dum, Tweedle-dee"), due to picking up on what he felt to be a hostility that a sizeable section of Yugoslav audiences and media exhibited towards the progressive sound. Appearing at the competition in February 1969, held that year in Zagreb, as one of the three acts representing RTV Belgrade (the other two being Lola Jovanović and Žarko Dančuo), Korni Grupa's singer Prelević showed up noticeably inebriated for the performance. Despite the band finishing third among seventeen competing acts, Prelević's behaviour led to an argument with bandleader Kovač that resulted in a mutual decision for Prelević to leave the band. Nevertheless, later in 1969, the band released "Cigu-ligu" as their debut single, with "Čovek i pas" ("A Man and a Dog") as the B-side, all three numbers recorded with Prelević on vocals, the latter of which Prelević would re-record decades later on his 1996 solo album Ja, Prele (I, Prele). After leaving Korni Grupa, Prelević appeared in the cult 1969 Yugoslav staging of the Hair musical in Atelje 212 theatre, recorded a studio album with progressive rock band Opus, a single with keyboardist Oliver Mandić, as well as several solo albums and devoted to a literary and journalism career.

The new Korni Grupa singer became Rijeka-based Dalibor Brun, formerly of Uragani whom he had recorded the single "Deborah" with. It was with Brun that Korni Grupa recorded their first moderate commercial hits "Magična ruka" ("The Magic Hand"), "Sonata" and "Dzum-ram". With Brun—himself fostering a typical festival singer image but a rock vocal style—the band succeeded in maintaining a double track career: alternating between being a festival band performing commercial pop rock songs on one hand and a progressive rock band following the current global rock musical trends on the other. With the folk-influenced song "Pastir i cvet" ("A Shepperd and a Flower"), the band appeared at the Singing Europe festival in Scheveningen, Netherlands winning the Golden Pier award for the most original act, despite being in competition with acts such as the Wallace Collection and Olivia Newton-John. The song, released as a single during 1969 by PGP-RTB, with "Ako budeš sama" ("If You Were Alone") as the B-side, featured Balkan folk instruments šargija, tarabuka and frula. This was however, the last recording with Brun as he, becoming less enthusiastic about the band's work, decided to leave the band conventionally. Having left Korni Grupa, Brun returned to Rijeka and joined the band Bohemi (The Bohemians), eventually starting a successful career as a pop singer.

=== Dado Topić years (1969–1971) ===
After Brun's departure, owing to the mutual friendship with dancer Lokica Stefanović, the new Korni Grupa vocalist became Dado Topić, formerly of the Osijek-based Dinamiti. With Topić, the band appeared at the Opatija festival, performing the song "Devojčice mala" ("Oh, Little Girl"), which would be released as a split single with the quartet 4M's song "Priča se" ("Rumour Has It"). With Topić, the band held their first solo concert in Belgrade, on 6 November 1969 in Belgrade Youth Center. The concert was entitled "Uz malu pomoć naših frendova" ("With a Little Help from Our Friends"). As the audience entered the Center's hall, they were greeted by the Yugoslav People's Army Guard military band performing marches and instrumental covers of Korni Grupa songs, and prior to the band's performance, on stage appeared judo fighters, ladies walking dogs and gallows with a hanged friar. During the concert the band performed only their progressive rock repertoire.

Soon after, Kacl left the band and decided to retire from the music business. He was replaced by Josip Boček, Topić's former Dinamiti bandmate who at the time fronted his own band Boček i Tri (Boček and Three). The new lineup started working on their own vision of progressive music, making recordings of the songs "Jedna žena" ("A Woman"), "Prvo svetlo u kući broj 4" ("The First Light in the House Number 4"), co-written by Topić and Kovač, classical music-inspired "Etida" ("Étude") and "Žena je luka a čovek brod" ("Woman is a Harbor and Man is a Ship").

With the performance of "Jedna žena" at the 1970 Zagreb Music Festival Korni Grupa won both the audience and jury Award for the Best Song. The band continued recording commercial material with the recording of the song "Bube" ("Beetles"), the theme song for the Miša Radivojević film This Crazy World of Ours (the literal translation of the original title Bube u glavi being Beetles in the Head), released on single with "Neko spava pored mene" ("Somebody is Sleeping Beside Me") as the B-side, arguably the first Yugoslav rock songs dealing with one-night stands. The band also released the highly successful "Trla baba lan" ("Granny Scutched the Flax"), "Slika" ("Image"), co-written with the at the time little known Ljuba Ninković (later of S Vremena Na Vreme fame), continuing their double musical career. During the same year, French singer Dalida released a French language cover of "Trla baba lan" under the title "Ram Dam Dam", her version achieving large success on the charts and leading to about 20 covers by European artists. The band also recorded the music for the 7-inch single featuring the songs "Vatra" ("Fire") and "Ljubav" ("Love") for popular singer Olivera Katarina. In the following years, the band would record music for two more 7-inch singles released by Katarina, the first one with the songs "Treperi jedno veče" ("An Evening Is Quivering") and "Htela bih da znam" ("I Would Like to Know"), released in 1972, and the second one with "Alba" and "Plovi lađa Dunavom" ("The Ship Is Sailing on the Danube"), released in 1973.

In 1971, as a part of celebration of the Yugoslav Revolution 30th anniversary, Korni Grupa recorded the rock epic "1941." on the lyrics of Branko Ćopić with Josipa Lisac as a guest vocalist. The material was recorded as a soundtrack for the Jedan čovek jedna pesma (One Man – One Song) television series, for which Momo Kapor did the mise-en-scène, directed by Jovan Ristić. Afterward, the band spent a month in Paris, playing at the fashion show which presented "Prokleta Jerina" ("Damned Jerina") line of clothing by fashion designer Aleksandar Joksimović, with some of these performance held in Bois de Boulogne. On these performances, the band performed "Pastir i cvet" and their versions of "March on the Drina" and the old patriotic song "Igrale se delije" ("The Heroes Danced"). Soon after, the band performed on the fashion show presenting "Prokleta Jerina" in Warsaw. At one of the Paris shows, the band had met the producer Alan Milo from the Barclay record label, who got interested in signing the band. The group made some demo recordings in Paris, however, guided by his own ambitions, Topić left the band to form Time, a progressive rock and jazz fusion group that would also go on to nationwide popularity, before becoming a successful solo act.

Topić was replaced by the former Ambasadori vocalist Zdravko Čolić in September 1971. A young singer with more of a festival schlager sensibility, twenty-year-old Čolić right away presented an uneasy fit with the band's well-established propensity for musical experimentation with even his vocal style and stage movements not fitting into the progressive aspect of the band's musical expression. Čolić thus remained in the band for only six months, recording three songs — "Gospa Mica gazdarica" ("Lady Mica the Landlord"), "Kukavica" ("The Cuckoo") and "Pogledaj u nebo" ("Look at the Sky") — before leaving to start a solo career that would by late 1970s see him become one of the most popular and commercial acts in SFR Yugoslavia. During Čolić's short stay, Korni Grupa shot a television special directed by Jovan Ristić, featuring songs from the band's commercial repertoire.

=== Zlatko Pejaković years (1972–1974) ===
In early 1972, a former Lavine (Avalanches), Zlatni Akordi and Had (Hades) member Zlatko Pejaković became the band's new singer, and with Pejaković, Korni Grupa recorded their first full-length album, Korni Grupa. At the time of the album release, Korni Grupa was one of four Yugoslav rock bands with a full-length album (Grupa 220, Žeteoci and Time being the other three), as the scene revolved mostly around 7-inch singles. The album featured complex songs "Put na Istok" ("A Trip to the East"), "Bezglave Ja Ha horde" ("The Headless Ya Ha Hordes"), "Moj bol" ("My Pain"), "Glas sa obale boja" ("A Voice from the Coast of Colors"). Following the album release, the band appeared at the Zagreb Music Festival and won the second place with the performance of the song "Kosovka devojka" ("Kosovo Maiden"), as well as performing at the 1972 Montreux Jazz Festival; on the latter performance, held on 22 June 1972, they were joined by Mića Marković (saxophone) and Mladi Levi member Petar Ugrin (violin, trumpet), and the group was announced as the Korni Group and Two Good Ones. In the meantime, the band recorded the first Yugoslav television show in color, Put za istok, edited by Jovan Ristić and directed by Dejan Karaklajić.

During the late 1973, Korni Grupa recorded a symphonic rock English language album Not an Ordinary Life, which they released under the name The Kornelyans through the Italian record label Ricordi. The album was produced by Carlo Alberto Rossi, a prominent Italian record producer and composer, who had been working with the Italian progressive acts of the time as Premiata Forneria Marconi, Banco and Area. The album was sold without much commercial promotion in ten thousand copies only, with the license for the album release being sold to Yugoslavia, Japan, Israel, and several South American countries. On the Yugoslav scene the band had an enormous success with the single "Ivo Lola", with the lyrics based on the last letter of Yugoslav World War II hero Ivo Lola Ribar to his fiancé Sloboda Trajković. The single's B-side featured the song "Znam za kim zvono zvoni" ("I Know for Whom the Bell Tolls"), featuring as guest the singer Ditka Haberl. The band also released their old song "Etida" on single, however the initial number of records featured the cover with the title mistakenly printed as "Edita". The single's B-side featured the shortened version of their old composition "Jedna žena", with the slightly altered title "Jednoj ženi" ("To a Woman"). The band also had success with their singles "Divlje jagode" ("Wild Strawberries"), "Zbogom ostaj o, detinjstvo" ("Farewell, Oh, Childhood"), with lyrics from a poem by Milovan Vitezović, "Miris" ("Scent"), with lyrics from Charles Baudelaire's sonnet "Parfum exotique", and "Praštanje" ("Forgiveness"), with lyrics by poet Brana Crnčević, who was at the time considered a dissident.

In the spring of 1974, they won first place at the Opatija Festival with the song "Moja generacija" ("My Generation"), thus representing Yugoslavia at the Eurovision Song Contest 1974 in Brighton, where ABBA won first place, and with whom the band had shared a wardrobe. The single, with the English-language version of "Moja generacija", with a shortened version of "Jednoj ženi" as the B-side, was released in Italy. During the same year the music magazine Music Week declared Korni Grupa the "Yugoslav Band of the Year" based on voting from the magazine's readers in Yugoslavia. However, disappointed with little success of Not an Ordinary Life and the 12th place finish at the Eurovision Song Contest, Kovač decided to disband Korni Grupa. They held two farewell concerts at Studio M in Novi Sad on November 24 and part of the concert recordings were released on the first double album in the history of Yugoslav rock music: the compilation Mrtvo more (The Dead Sea). One record featured their singles, representing commercial and more pop-oriented side of Korni Grupa, while the other featured live recordings of "Put za Istok", "Čovek sa belom zastavom" ("The Man with a White Flag") and "Blues", representing the progressive side of their career. The band officially disbanded on December 1, 1974.

=== Post breakup ===
After Korni Grupa disbanded, Kovač started a successful career as a composer, arranger and producer, Pejaković turned towards pop music, Boček and Hreljac became studio musicians and Furduj started a career in jazz. The various artists live album Randevu s muzikom (A Rendevouz with Music), released in 1977, featured the Korni Grupa songs "I ne tako obićan život" ("Not an Ordinary Life at All") and "Jedna žena" recorded at Novi Sad farewell concerts, which were previously unreleased. During the same year, Kovač initiated the formation of a supergroup K2 (not to be confused with the 1990s duo consisting of Kovač's daughters) which ought to have featured Josip Boček, Dado Topić, Sloba Marković, Čarli Novak and Ratko Divljak, but it was never formed mostly owing to Topić's hesitation. In 1979, the 1971 recording of the musical epic "1941." was released as Korni Grupa's posthumous studio album 1941..

Korni Grupa's original guitarist Velibor Kacl died in a car accident on 17 May 1984.

=== 1987 "Legende YU Rocka" reunion ===
In May 1987, Korni Grupa—with its established former core of Kovač, Furduj, Hreljac, and Boček, as well as Dado Topić on vocals—reunited to perform, alongside Indexi, Time, YU Grupa, Drago Mlinarec, and R.M. Točak Band, at the Legende YU Rocka (Legends of YU Rock) concert organized by Radio 101 at Zagreb's Dom Sportova. A few weeks later, in June, the same bands performed at Belgrade's Sava Centar. In December 1987, the show moved on to Sarajevo's Zetra Hall.

Korni Grupa's live performance of "Jedna žena", recorded at the Zagreb concert, appeared on the 1987 various artists double live album Legende YU Rocka, released by Jugoton.

=== Post 1987 ===
In 1994, the previously unreleased Korni Grupa song "Prvo svetlo u kući broj 4" appeared on the compilation album Plima: Progresivna muzika (Tide: Progressive Music), released as a part of Komuna's YU retROCKspektiva (YU RetROCKspective) album series.

In 1996, the compilation album Prvo svetlo neobičnog života (The First Light of an Unordinary Life) was released, featuring a selection of tracks from Korni Grupa's progressive repertoire. During the same year, Kovač released the compilation album Moja generacija (My Generation), consisting of recordings of his songs used in the television show Zvučna viljuška (Tuning Fork), including cover versions of the Korni Grupa songs "Moja generacija" by Filip Žmaher, "Sonata" by Zoran Šandorov, "Oj, dodole" ("Hey, Dodola") by Del Arno Band and "Jagode i maline" ("Strawberries and Raspberries") by Van Gogh.

In 2005, the three-part compilation album Ne tako običan život (Not an Ordinary Life at All) was released by PGP-RTS, featuring the collected singles, recordings from the progressive phase, the recording of "Jedna žena" from the 1987 reunion concert and the previously unreleased version of the song "Kosovka devojka" with Kovač on lead vocals. In 2008, the same label released the DVD Korni Grupa, featuring the band's music videos, TV appearances, concert recordings, as well as recordings from the band's rehearsals in Belgrade Youth Center and Belgrade club Cepelin.

The band's second vocalist, Dušan Prelević, died in Belgrade after long illness on 28 July 2007. Furduj died in Belgrade on 1 June 2015.

=== 2019 reunion ===
In 2018, it was announced that Korni Grupa would reunite for a farewell concert to be held in Belgrade's Sava Centar, with a lineup that was to feature Kornelije Kovač on keyboards, Josip Boček on guitar, and Dado Topić on vocals, along with three younger musicians, Peđa Milanović (bass guitar), Aleksandar Miletić (keyboards), and Ratko Ljubičić (drums). It was further announced that Bojan Hreljac would also perform, but that his role would be reduced to a guest appearance on a single song due to his health condition. However, the planned reunion ended up facing numerous difficulties.

The show was originally announced for 30 November 2018, but was postponed for 31 January 2019. In the meantime, on 19 December 2018, Hreljac died in Belgrade. Prior to the concert, the organizers announced that Dado Topić might not appear due to his own health problems and that guest vocalists would fill in for him. Eventually, Topić did appear, but only on a handful of songs, while the rest of the set featured guest vocalists: Dejan Cukić, Goran Šepa, Zoran Šandrov, and Dušan Svilar.

During the same year, the German record label Hollow Cloud Music released the vinyl record featuring the 1970 recording of "Jedna žena", featuring Topić on vocals, and the 1972 recording of "Igra na Šar-planini" ("Dance on the Šar Mountains"), featuring Pejaković on vocals and recorded with Mića Marković and Peter Ugrin.

=== Post 2019 ===
In 2020, PGP-RTS and Croatia Records jointly released the box set Original Album Collection, featuring Korni Grupa, Not an Ordinary Life and Mrtvo more, as well as Kovač's first three solo albums.

Kovač died in Belgrade on 13 September 2022 of the complications caused by COVID-19.

== Legacy ==
The musicians which cited Korni Grupa as an influence include Smak guitarist Radomir Mihajlović "Točak", guitarist and former Leb i Sol member Vlatko Stefanovski, guitarist and singer and former Grupa 220, Parni Valjak, Aerodrom and Azra member Jurica Pađen, singer-songwriter Đorđe Balašević, Riblja Čorba guitarist and Bajaga i Instruktori vocalist and guitarist Momčilo Bajagić "Bajaga", Idoli member and singer-songwriter Vlada Divljan, Kerber vocalist Goran Šepa, and others.

A number of acts have covered Korni Grupa songs. The song "Trla baba lan" was covered in 1970 by French singer Dalida under the title "Ram Dam Dam", the cover achieving large success and leading to a number of covers by European artists. The Yugoslav jazz/funk group Ansambl Saše Subote covered the song "Ivo Lola" on their 1976 extended play Mikado, released for the Soviet market. The song was remixed in 2010 by the Serbian project Laura 2000 on their debut studio album ...pobiću se zadnji put da vidim da l' sam star (... I'll Have a One Last Fight to See if I'm Old). The Serbian actor Milorad Mandić covered the song "Trla baba lan" on his 1991 children's music album of the same name. The Serbian rock band Električni Orgazam recorded a cover version of "Magična ruka", released on their 1996 unplugged album Živo i akustično (Live and Acoustic). The soundtrack for the Radio Television of Serbia television show Zlatna viljuška (The Golden Fork) featured cover versions of Korni Grupa songs "Moja generacija" by Filip Žmaher, "Sonata" by Zoran Šandorov, "Oj, dodole" by Del Arno Band and "Jagode i maline" by Van Gogh, all featured on the Kornelije Kovač compilation album Moja generacija. The Bajaga i Instruktori keyboard player Saša Lokner recorded an instrumental version of "Put za istok", the version in itself featuring a sample of the Korni Grupa song "Zemlja", released on his 2004 solo album Evropa Elektro Express (Europe Electro Express). Serbian and Yugoslav rock band Jakarta covered the song "Jagode i maline" on their 2020 album Letim (I'm Flying).

The book YU 100: najbolji albumi jugoslovenske rok i pop muzike (YU 100: The Best albums of Yugoslav pop and rock music), published in 1988, features two Korni Grupa albums: Korni Grupa, polled No. 4, and 1941., polled No. 94.

The Rock Express Top 100 Yugoslav Rock Songs of All Times list, published in 2000, featured two songs by Korni Grupa: "Put za istok" (polled No.44) and "Jedna žena" (polled No.67). In 2011, the song "Etida" was polled, by the listeners of Radio 202, one of 60 greatest songs released by PGP-RTB/PGP-RTS during the sixty years of the label's existence.

The lyrics of the songs "Put za istok", "Moj bol" and "Jedna žena" were featured in Petar Janjatović's book Pesme bratstva, detinjstva & potomstva: Antologija ex YU rok poezije 1967 - 2007 (Songs of Brotherhood, Childhood & Offspring: Anthology of Ex YU Rock Poetry 1967 – 2007).

== Members ==
Former members

- Kornelije "Bata" Kovač – keyboards, organ, piano, vocals (1968–1974, 1987, 2019)
- Bojan Hreljac – bass guitar (1968–1974, 1987)
- Vladimir "Furda" Furduj – drums (1968–1974, 1987)
- Velibor "Borko" Kacl – guitar (1968–1969)
- Miroslava "Seka" Kojadinović – vocals (1968)
- Dušan Prelević "Prele" – vocals (1968)
- Dalibor Brun – vocals (1969)
- Dado Topić – vocals (1969–1971, 1987, 2019)
- Josip Boček – guitar (1969–1974, 1987, 2019)
- Zdravko Čolić – vocals (1971–1972)
- Zlatko Pejaković – vocals (1972–1974)

=== Live musicians ===
- Peđa Milanović – bass guitar (2019)
- Aleksandar Miletić – keyboards (2019)
- Ratko Ljubičić – drums (2019)

== Discography ==
=== Studio albums ===
- Korni Grupa (1972)
- Not an Ordinary Life (1974)
- 1941. (1979)

=== Compilation albums ===
- Korni Grupa (1971)
- Mrtvo more (1975)
- Prvo svetlo neobičnog života (1996)
- Kolekcija singlova (2001)
- Ne tako običan život (I posle trideset godina) (2005)
- The Ultimate Collection (2009)
- Original Album Collection (2020)

=== Extended plays ===
- Dzum-ram (1969)
- Zabranjeno za mlade (1971)
- TV špice (1973)

=== Singles ===
- "Cigu-ligu" / "Čovek i pas" (1969)
- "Pastir i cvet" / "Čovek i pas" (1969)
- "Trla baba lan" / "Slika" (1970)
- "Bube" / "Neko spava pored mene" (1970)
- "Pusti da te diram" / "Jedan groš" (1971)
- "Pokloni svoj mi foto" / "Bez veze" (1972)
- "Tri palme" / "Tri čoveka u kafani" (1973)
- "Oj, dodole" / "Život" (1973)
- "Ivo Lola" / "Znam za kim zvono zvoni" (1973)
- "Etida" / "Jednoj ženi" (1973)
- "Moja generacija" / "Zbogom ostaj, o, detinjstvo" (1974)
- "Generation 42" / "One Woman" (1974)
- "Moja genereacija (My Genetartion)" / "Etude" (1974)
- "Kuda ideš, svete moj" / "Divlje jagode" (1974)
- "Miris" / "Praštanje" (1974)

=== Other appearances ===
- "Moja generacija" (Eurovision '74; 1974)
- "I ne tako obićan život" / "Jedna žena" (Randevu s muzikom; 1977)
- "Jedna žena" (Legende YU Rocka; 1987)

=== Video albums ===
- Korni Grupa (2008)

Preceded by Zdravko Čolić	Yugoslavia in the Eurovision Song Contest; 1974	Succeeded by Pepel in Kri
