= Antun Nikolić Tuca =

Croatian musician, composer (born 1943)

- Born: 10 June 1943 (age 83)
- Origin: Županja, Croatia
- Genres: Folk, Rock
- Occupations: Croatian musician – composer, multi-instrumentalist, arranger, music producer, ethnographer, tamburitza virtuoso
- Instruments: tamburitza, electric guitar

Antun Nikolić Tuca (Županja, Croatia, 10 June 1943) Croatian musician, composer, multi-instrumentalist, arranger, music producer, ethnographer, tamburitza virtuoso

== Biography ==
Antun Nikolić Tuca is a Croatian composer, arranger, music producer, music editor, ethnographer, tamburitza virtuoso, and multi-instrumentalist. Along with Pajo Kolarić, Franjo Kuhač, Julije Njikoš, Mijo Majer and Branko Mihaljević, he is considered a "legend of tamburitza music".

He was born in Županja, Croatia, on 10 June 1943. As a six-year-old boy, he played tamburitza in a school show. His family moved to Osijek in 1956, where he attended Osijek's reputable music school, “Franjo Kuhač”, along with primary school. In 1958, before he was fully fifteen, he became a member of Radio Osijek's Tamburitza Orchestra, led by the giant of tamburitza music, Julije Njikoš, until 1964. In this orchestra Nikolić played all of the tamburitza instruments. There his successful music work started, not only with folk significance, but also with a cultural and social dimension.

At the beginning of the 1960s, along with tamburitza instruments (and other stringed instruments banjo, bouzouki, balalaika, then piano, mouth organ, fife, kazoo, ocarina) Nikolić also played the electric guitar. Along with Krunoslav Kićo Slabinac, he formed the band Tornado and then, in 1963, the legendary rock band Dinamiti, which was the most famous rock band in ex- Yugoslavia in the 1960s, and which also performed around Europe. In 1967 Antun Nikolić Tuca went into military service. After serving in the military he came back in 1969 to tamburitza music. The same year he re-formed and began leading The Big Tamburitza Orchestra of Radio Osijek, with which he works as conductor, arranger, music producer and music editor. He also collects, records and preserves the enormous traditional values of Northeast Croatia.

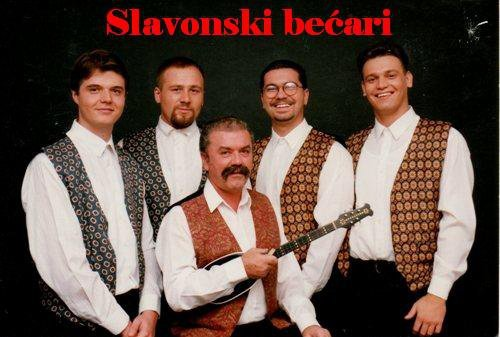
Slavonski Bećari 1997

In the year 1971 from The Big Tamburitza Orchestra of Radio Osijek, Antun Nikolić formed the tamburitza ensemble Slavonski bećari which remained active until 2011. Slavonski Bećari is the oldest and the most famous tamburitza ensemble in Croatia. Through their 40 years of work they have been performing countless number of times, traveled around the world (16 times in the United States and Canada, 2 times in Australia, in most of the European countries). Slavonski bećari published 4 single and 11 long play studio albums, 7 compilations, 35 festival records, 532 in HUZIP recorded television performances. They have cooperated with many well-known homeland and overseas singers and earned many international and national rewards and prizes.

== Significance of Tuca's work ==
Along with playing instruments, directing and arranging, Antun Nikolić Tuca was also collecting and recording the cultural music heritage of Northeast Croatia. What Franjo Kuhač started in the 19th century, was continued in the 20th century by Branko Mihaljević and Julije Njikoš, and in his own way in the 21st century by Antun Nikolić Tuca.

Along with ethnographic work on collecting and preserving folk heritage, as the long-standing music editor on Radio Osijek (1969 -2005), Nikolić used his position to record a great number of folk motifs, and in his many television appearances and radio broadcasts he promoted folk songs and traditional dances from the area of Slavonija, Baranja and Srijem. Among his many public performances, his solo at the concert of the 100 best Croatian tamburitza players under the name of “Šokačka Rapsodija”, which was included in the Guinness book of records for its number of players, stands out.

235 of Tuca's works are listed in the Croatian music authors database and in the Radio Osijek music library there is about 500 music numbers signed by the name of Antun Nikolić Tuca.

== Discography ==
=== Video publications ===
- Krunoslav Kićo Slabinac and Slavonski bećari for Croatian Fraternal Union
- I. S. V. Rodna grudo moja – Slavonski bećari, Mirjana Primorac and Miroslav Škoro
- I. S. V. Slavonski bećari, Mirjana Primorac and KUD Osijek 1862

=== Discography ===
- 1970. Blaženka and Pero Nikolin with Radio Osijek's Tamburitza Orchestra – Meni nana za mog diku brani – Otkrit ćemo, diko, tajnu – Dosta mi je momkovanja – Hajd' u kolo (A. Nikolić, Z. Batistuta, A. Nikolić), music producer A. Nikolić
- 1970. Blaženka and Pero Nikolin – Daleko je domovina (Z. Čaćija, Z. Čaćija, A. Nikolić), music producer A. Nikolić
- 1970. Aca Đigunović – Lovačka pjesma (A. Nikolić, A. Đigunović, A. Nikolić), conductor A. Nikolić
- 1971. Radio Osijek's Tamburitza Orchestra – Slavonijo, zemljo plemenita (Slavonian folk songs and kola, arranger A. Nikolić), conductors A. Nikolić and D. Repar
- 1972. Zdenko Dobek – Moja seka (B. Mihaljević, B. Mihaljević, A. Nikolić), conductor of Radio Osijek's Tamburitza Orchestra A. Nikolić
- 1973. Blaženka and Pero Nikolin – Daleko sam u tuđini (Z. Čačija, A. Nikolić, Z. Čačija)
- 1973. Blaženka Nikolin – Plakat ću do posljednje suze (arranger A. Nikolić)
- 1973. Pero Nikolin – Stare bekrije (lyrics and arrangement for some songs A. Nikolić)
- 1975. Matija Pavlović and Radio Osijek's Tamburitza Orchestra under the leadership of Antun Nikolić Tuca – Ej, Baranjo (lyrics and arrangement for some songs A. Nikolić)

=== Discography Slavonski Bećari ===
- 1973. Krunoslav Kićo Slabinac and Slavonski bećari – Bećarac (arranger A. Nikolić)
- 1974. Krunoslav Kićo Slabinac and Slavonski bećari – Kad čujem tambure / Lijepa moja Slavonija (arranger A. Nikolić)
- 1975. Krunoslav Kićo Slabinac, Slavonski bećari and Radio Osijek's Tamburitza Orchestra – Hej, bećari (conductor and arranger A. Nikolić)
- 1979. Krunoslav Kićo Slabinac – Seoska sam lola (arranger A. Nikolić, K. Slabinac)
- 1984. Krunoslav Kićo Slabinac and tamburitza ensemble Slavonski bećari under leadership of Antun Nikolić Tuca – Svatovac / Svi se momci oženiše (arrangers P. Nikolin i A. Nikolić)
- 1982. Ensemble Slavonski Bećari – Hrvatske Božićne pjesme (arranger A. Nikolić)
- 1983. Slavonski bećari and Mirjana Primorac – Ljubila sam crno oko (arranger and music producer A. Nikolić)
- 1985. Fabijan Šovagović and Slavonski Bećari – Pokraj Karašice (music editor and arranger A. Nikolić)
- Šima Jovanovac and Slavonski Bećari – Stari Graničari / Pjevat će Slavonija (arranger A. Nikolić)
- 1986. Slavonski bećari – Zaplešimo uz tambure (music producer and arranger A. Nikolić)
- 1988. Slavonski bećari, Mirjana Primorac, Miroslav Škoro and Zdenko Nikšić (arranger A. Nikolić)
- 1992. Ensemble Antuna Nikolića Tuce Slavonski Bećari – Neće snaša tamburaša (music producer and arranger A. Nikolić)
- 1995. Ensemble Antuna Nikolića Tuce Slavonski Bećari (arranger and author of some songs A. Nikolić)
- 1998. Slavonski bećari – Baš je bila luda godina (arranger and author of some songs A. Nikolić)
- 2003. Slavonski bećari – Narodne Božićne pjesme (arranger A. Nikolić)
