= Branko Mihaljević =

Croatian composer and journalist

Branko Mihaljević (Zagreb, 19 January 1931 – Osijek, 19 September 2005) was a Croatian composer, writer, journalist and radio editor.

He spent his career, starting in 1952, in Osijek as editor of music and music-documentary programs of Radio-Osijek, and as head of the Center of Culture University, which provided adult education. One of the songs which he helped become popular is a children's song "Zeko i potočić". He also wrote a song "Moj Osijek" which many people accepted as a town anthem. He wrote more than twenty children's operettas for the Osijek children theatre, now named "Children theatre Branko Mihaljević"), most based on librettos of Ratko Zvrko. He wrote the first Slavonian musical "Slavonska rapsodija", which is based on authentic folklore. One of the things for which he will be best remembered is a children's song he wrote in 1954, about a rabbit and a frozen stream, for one of his events which was short of children's songs. The album which includes this song is the bestselling children's album in Croatia, for which he received Croatia Records platinum record.

As a journalist, he documented the autochthon culture and art of Slavonia and Baranja, for which he received the "Golden pen of the year" from the Croatian Journalists' Association. He also received the Order of Danica Hrvatska with the face of Marko Marulić medal and the Osječko-baranjska županija prize for a life opus in the area of culture. He received "Reward city of Osijek" twice (1962, 1979).

He was buried 21 September 2005. One of his last works was the book, "Tragovima osječke glazbe", published in 2002, in which, in a nostalgic and warm style, he explores the origins of Osijek musicology. His son, Mario Mihaljević, is a composer of pop-music and a writer, and his grandson Branimir Mihaljević is a singer and composer too.

== Works ==
=== Main musicals ===
- "Zeko, Zriko i Janje", 1958. (one of the most viewed hits from former Yugoslavia)
- "Mišić Gricko", 1960.
- "Veliki šumski događaj", 1963.
- "Slavonska rapsodija", 1978.
- "Osječki karusel"

=== Songs ===
- "Bijeli sombrero"
- "Davor i harmonika"
- "Dok si pored mene"
- "Golubovi"
- "Kada je maca sama"
- "Kauboj i Indijanci"
- "Moj Zagreb"
- "Pjevat će Slavonija"
- "Ti si moj san"
- "Uspavanka Opatiji"
- "Zeko i potočić"

== Sources ==
- Mihaljević, Branko at hds.hr (in Croatian)
- Mihaljević, Branko at hrt.hr (in Croatian)
