= Slovenian song festival =

Music festival in Slovenia

Slovenian song festival (In Slovene: Slovenska popevka) was a Slovenian music festival dedicated to a music genre known as Slovenian song (Slovene: popevka) that was most popular during the 1960s and 1970s and had a similarly high standing in Slovene culture as did the Sanremo Music Festival in Italian culture. It began in 1962 and ended in 1983, with an attempt at its revival in 1998.

== History ==
The festival in 1962 was organized at the town of Bled, and in 1964 moved to Slovenia's capital city Ljubljana.

== 1960s and 1970s winners ==
Year	Song	Performers
1962	Mandolina	Stane Mancini & Beti Jurkovič
1963	Orion	Marjana Deržaj & Katja Levstik
1963	Malokdaj se srečava	Beti Jurkovič & Lado Leskovar
1964	Poletna noč	Beti Jurkovič (first version)
1964	Poletna noč	Marjana Deržaj (second version)
1965	Šel si mimo	Irena Kohont
1966	Ples oblakov	Marjana Deržaj
1967	Vzameš me v roke	Elda Viler
1968	Presenečenja	Bele vrane & Bor Gostiša
1969	Zakaj tvoj dom, zakaj moj dom	Jožica Svete
1969	Maček v žaklju	Bele vrane
1969	Neizpeta melodija	Lidija Kodrič
1970	Solza, ki je ne prodam	Edvin Fliser
1970	Ti si moj pravi človek	Lidija Kodrič
1971	Včeraj, danes, jutri	Elda Viler
1971	Trideset let	Oto Pestner
1972	Med iskrenimi ljudmi	Majda Sepe
1973	Leti, leti lastovka	Edvin Fliser
1974	Uspavanka za mrtve vagabunde	Majda Sepe
1975	Mi smo taki	Marjana Deržaj & Braco Koren
1976	Samo nasmeh je bolj grenak	Ditka Haberl
1977	Vrača se pomlad	Oto Pestner
1978	Jamajka	Tomaž Domicelj
1978	Moje orglice	Janko Ropret
1979	Avtomat	Tomaž Domicelj
