= Ekatarina Velika discography =

- Studio albums: 7
- Live albums: 6
- Compilation albums: 5
- Tribute albums: 2
- Video albums: 1
- Box sets: 2
- Promotional singles: 4

The discography of Ekatarina Velika, a Serbian alternative rock band from Belgrade, formed in 1982, consists of seven studio albums, six live albums, five compilation albums, two box sets, one video album and four promotional singles.

== Studio albums ==
Year	Album details
1984	Katarina II: Released: 1984; Label: ZKP RTLJ; Format: LP
1985	Ekatarina Velika: Released: 1985; Label: ZKP RTLJ; Format: LP, cassette
1986	S' vetrom uz lice: Released: April 1986; Label: ZKP RTLJ; Format: LP, cassette
1987	Ljubav: Released: 1987; Label: PGP-RTB; Format: LP, cassette
1989	Samo par godina za nas: Released: February 1989; Label: PGP-RTB; Format: LP, cassette
1991	Dum Dum: Released: 1991; Label: PGP-RTB; Format: CD, LP, cassette
1993	Neko nas posmatra: Released: April 1993; Label: PGP RTS; Format: CD, LP, cassette

== Live albums ==
Year	Album details
1987	19LIVE86: Released: January 1987; Label: ZKP RTLJ; Format: LP, cassette
1997	Live '88: Released: 1997; Label: Global Music; Format: CD
2001	Kao u snu – EKV Live 1991: Released: 2001; Label: EKV Records; Format: CD, cassette
2015	Iznad grada: Released: 13 July 2015; Label: Mascom; Format: 2×CD
2017	Krug: Released: 2017; Label: Mascom; Format: 2×CD
2022	EKV Unplugged Skopje 1992: Released: 7 October 2022; Label: Zadužbina Milana Mladenovića; Format: Digital download, streaming

== Compilation albums ==
Year	Album details
1995	The Best of Ekatarina: Released: 1995; Label: ZKP RTVS; Format: CD
1997	Kao nada, kao govor, kao more...: Released: 1997; Label: PGP RTS; Format: CD, 2×cassette
2004	Ekatarina Velika: Released: 2004; Label: ZKP RTVS; Format: 2×CD
2007	EKV Revisited: Released: 2007; Label: PGP RTS; Format: CD
2026	Ekatarina Velika (Arhiva 1983–1993): Released: 14 August 2026; Label: Zadužbina Milana Mladenovića; Format: Digital download, streaming

== Box sets ==
Year	Album details
1997	Osvrni se mirno na godine prošle: Released: 1997; Label: Not on label; Format: 4×cassette
2025	EKV Box Set: Released: 17 April 2025; Label: ZKP RTVS, PGP RTS, Zadužbina Milana Mladenovića; Format: 8×LP, 2×CD

== Video albums ==
Year	Album details
2010	Kao da je bilo nekad: Released: 2010; Label: Multimedia Music; Format: DVD

== Singles ==
=== Promotional singles ===
Title	Year	Album
"Zemlja" / "Prvi i poslednji dan"	1987	Ljubav
"Par godina za nas" / "Iznad grada"	1989	Samo par godina za nas
"Ti si sav moj bol" (Unplugged in Skopje 1992)	2022	EKV Unplugged Skopje 1992
"Bežimo u mrak" (1988)	2025	Ekatarina Velika (Arhiva 1983–1993)
