= Tihomir Pop Asanović =

Croatian keyboardist and composer

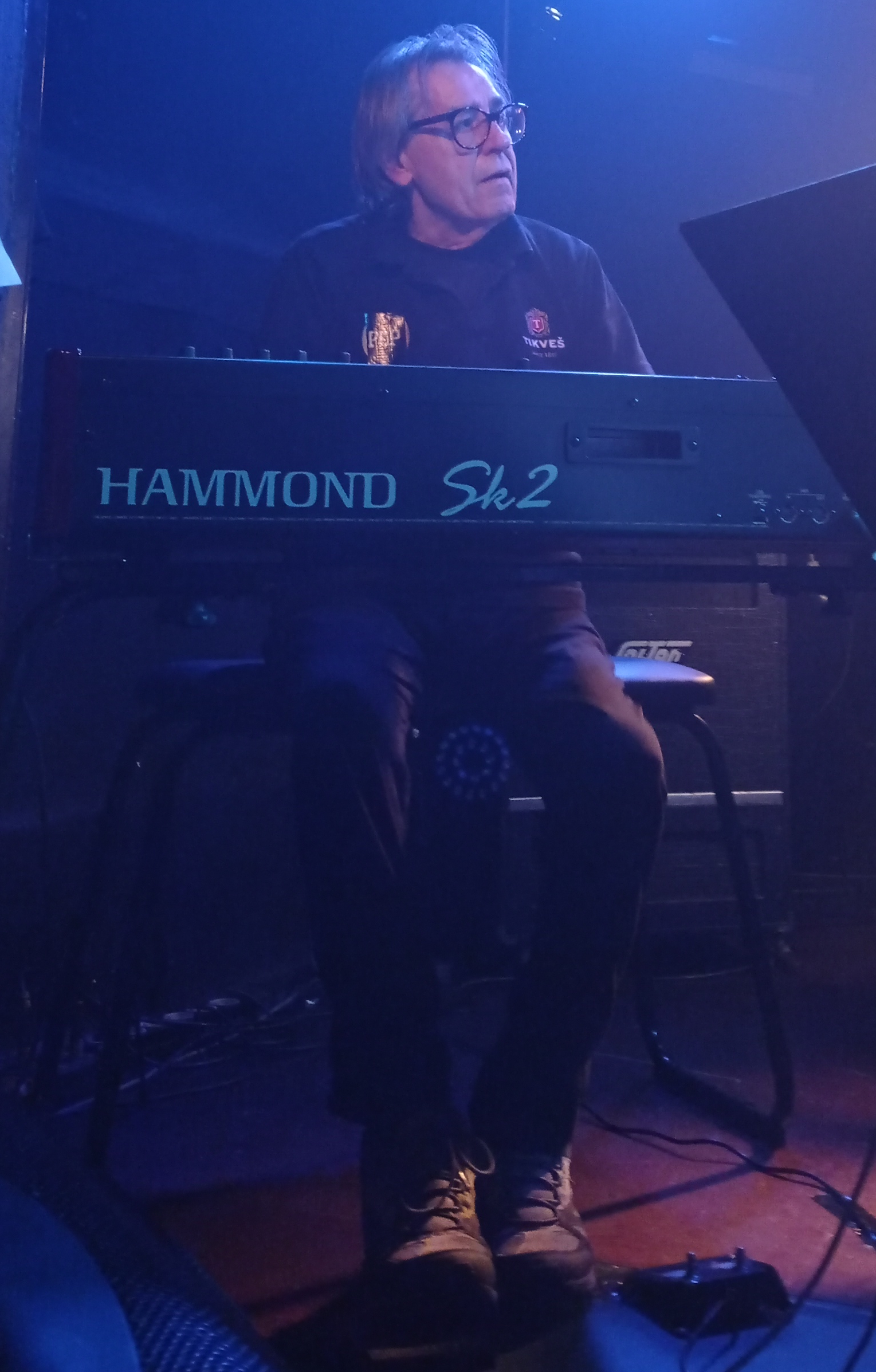
- Tihomir Pop Asanović performing live in Ljubljana, Slovenia, 2 December 2022

Background information
- Also known as: Pop
- Born: Tihomir Asanović; 16 November 1948 (age 77); Skopje, PR Macedonia, FPR Yugoslavia
- Genres: Jazz, Funk, jazz-rock, fusion, pop, blues
- Occupations: musician, composer
- Instruments: Keyboard instrument, Hammond B-3
- Years active: 1967 - present
- Labels: Jugoton, ZKP RTLJ, PGP-RTB, Suzy
- Formerly of: September

Tihomir "Pop" Asanović (born 16 November 1948) is a Croatian jazz-rock and fusion keyboardist, Hammond organ player and composer.

Asanović is a keyboardist who played in the 1970s and in early 1980s in various Yugoslavian musical line-ups and toured with them around the world. On the 1973 tour with Boško Petrović in East Berlin, he was proclaimed as being the fourth best jazz organist in Europe.

== Career ==
Asanović finished musical high school in Skopje. At 16 years, he started to perform with big dancing orchestra of RTV Skopje. When he was 18 years old, he relocated to Germany, where he performed for one year with the band Montenegro Five, then he joined the band The Generals and toured with them through Switzerland, where Janez Bončina also joined the band. In the year 1971, he returned to homeland with the band The Generals, where the band performed on Adriatic Show, which was organised by Vladimir Mihaljek - Miha.

At the same time he played with Boško Petrović on various jazz festivals. Based on the concerts where he performed he was proclaimed as being the fourth best jazz organist in Europe by the Jazz Podium magazine. At the end of 1971 the band The Generals disbanded. In the same year Asanović joined the band Time, which had other members Dado Topić, Ratko Divjak, Vedran Božić, Mario Mavrin and Brane Lambert Živković. The band immediately started with their work and in 1972 their first album Time was released. After the release of this album Janez Bončina invited Asanović to the newly established band September, whose other members were Petar Ugrin, Čarli Novak, Braco Doblekar and Ratko Divjak; who has also left the band Time. In between Jugoslovenska Pop Selekcija band was formed, whose members were all great instrumentalists from the former SFR Yugoslavia. With Jugoslovenska Pop Selekcija Asanović has performed the song Berlin on the World Festival of Youth and Students in East Berlin in the year 1973, for which he received the prize. The song has been released on the compilation album of the festival. In the year 1975 on the initiative of Đorđe Novković the only album of Jugoslovenska Pop Selekcija was released titled Slatka Lola.

In the year 1973 Asanović performed on the concerts with the bands YU Grupa and Smak. In 1974 he recorded his solo album Majko Zemljo, on which Josipa Lisac, Nada Žgur, Doca Marolt, Dado Topić and Janez Bončina were the singers. The members who have played the instruments were Dragi Jelić (guitar), Mario Mavrin (bass), Ratko Divjak (drums), Petar Ugrin (trumpet), Braco Doblekar (congas), Stanko Arnold (trumpet) and other leading Zagreb based musicians. Along with Asanović the authors of the songs were Janez Bončina, Dado Topić and Miljenko Prohaska. Around 200,000 - 250,000 copies of this album were sold. In the year 1976 Asanović has recorded his second solo album titled Pop, for which he wrote the songs with Dado Topić. On this album Zdenka Kovačiček and Janez Bončina were the singers.

With the band September, Asanović recorded two albums and three singles. He toured with the band in Soviet Union, United States, Cuba and East Germany. Band has recorded their second album Domovina moja while on tour through United States, which lasted 7 months. The band disbanded in 1979.

After a longer break, he returned to the music business in the year 2018 with the album "Povratak prvoj ljubavi". The LP and CD was released for Croatia Records. The album is also featuring Israeli Jazz artist Amir Gwirtzman on the songs Express Novi Sad and Ludo momče Makedonče.

Asanović has created a public image of an instrumentalist who has regularly played with jazz musicians or toured through Soviet Union as a member of various bands, amongst which were also the band Pro arte. Afterwards he distanced himself from the musical scene and focused on the business by opening a musical instruments store.

== Discography ==
=== Solo ===
- Majko Zemljo (1974)
- Pop (1976)

=== With the band Time ===
- Time (1972)
- Time II (1975)
- Time & Dado Topić (1996)
- Vrijeme (2000)
- The Ultimate Collection (2007)

=== With the band September ===
- Luduj s nama (1976)
- Zadnja avantura (1976)
- BOOM '76 (compilation, 1976)
- Prle upeco ribu (1977)
- Randevu s muzikom (compilation, 1977)
- Domovino moja (1978)
- Domovina moja (1979)
- The Best of September (compilation, 2003)

=== With the band Jugoslovenska Pop Selekcija ===
- Slatka Lola (1975)
