= September (band) =

Yugoslavian jazz rock band

- September in 1977, from left to right: Braco Doblekar, Tihomir "Pop" Asanović, Nelfi Depangher, Marjan Maliković, Jadran Ogrin, Janez Bončina

Background information
- Origin: Ljubljana, SR Slovenia, SFR Yugoslavia
- Genres: Jazz rock; progressive rock
- Years active: 1975–1979 (Reunions: 2003, 2012)
- Labels: PGP-RTB, Jugoton, ZKP RTLJ
- Past members: Janez Bončina; Tihomir Asanović; Petar Ugrin; Ratomir Divjak; Karel Novak; Braco Doblekar; Marijan Maliković; Nelfi Depangher; Jadran Ogrin; Nelfi Depangher; Ante Mažuran; Dane Gančev; Tone Dimnik; Tulio Furlanič

September was a Slovenian and Yugoslav rock band formed in Ljubljana in 1975. They were one of the most prominent acts of the 1970s Yugoslav rock scene.

The band was formed by at-the-time already prominent musicians Janez Bončina (vocals), Tihomir "Pop" Asanović (organ), Petar Ugrin (trumpet, violin), Ratomir "Ratko" Divjak (drums), Karel "Čarli" Novak (bass guitar) and Braco Doblekar (saxophone, percussion). The band's debut album, Zadnja avantura, brought them nationwide popularity with its jazz rock sound. After its release, Ugrin, Divjak and Novak left the band. September was joined by Marijan Maliković (guitar), Jadran Ogrin (bass guitar) and Nelfi Depangher (drums), the new lineup recording the album Domovina moja, with which they moved towards less complex, more rock-oriented sound. The band disbanded in 1979, reuniting for live performances in 2003 and 2012.

== History ==
=== 1975–1979 ===
September was formed in Ljubljana in 1975 by organist Tihomir "Pop" Asanović and vocalist Janez Bončina, both of them already prominent figures on the Yugoslav rock scene. During the 1960s Asanović was a member of the band The Generals, which performed mostly abroad, in clubs. After The Generals disbanded in 1971, Asanović joined the band Time and later performed with the pop rock band Pro Arte on several of their Soviet Union tours. He released two solo albums and was a founding member of the supergroup Jugoslovenska Pop Selekcija (Yugoslav Pop Selection), which led to the forming of September. Bončina, who, for a period of time, played for Yugoslavia national under-21 football team, formed his first band, Helioni (The Helions) with Tomaž Domicelj, who would later rise to fame as a singer-songwriter. Benčina graduated from the Ljubljana Academy of Fine Arts and for a period of time wrote about rock music for various magazines. At the beginning of 1968 he joined the band Mladi Levi as a guitarist, and, after the band's vocalist left the group, switched to vocals. He sang in the last lineup of The Generals and managed to release three solo 7" singles. After these releases, he formed the band Srce (Heart), which released only one 7" single, "Gvendolina, kdo je bil?" / "Zlatna obala" ("Gwendolina, Who Was That?" / "Golden Shore"), the title track becoming a minor hit. After Srce disbanded, he joined Asanović's Jugoslovenska Pop Selekcija and appeared as a vocalist on both of Asanović's solo albums.

Besides Asanović and Bončina, the first lineup of September featured trumpeter and violinist Petar Ugrin, drummer Ratomir "Ratko" Divjak, bass guitarist Karel "Čarli" Novak and saxophonist and percussionist Braco Doblekar, all of them already prominent names of Yugoslav music. Ugrin graduated from Ljubljana Academy of Music. He was previously a member of Mladi Levi and Jugoslovenska Pop Selekcija and performed with Korni Grupa on their 1972 concert at the Montreux Jazz Festival. He was a member of jazz groups Pop-Jazz Ljubljana and Trumpets & Rhythms Unit, performing with them on a large number of jazz festivals in Yugoslavia and abroad. For a number of years he played violin in Slovenian Philharmonic Orchestra and trumpet in RTV Ljubljana Dance Orchestra and, for a period of time, worked as a professor on the jazz institute of the University of Music and Performing Arts in Graz, Austria. Divjak was a student of the Graz University of Music and Performing Arts and a former member of the bands Dinamiti, BP convention and Time. Novak previously played both in The Generals and Srce and was at the time of September formation a studio musician. Doblekar was formerly a member of The Generals, Srce, Pro Arte and Jugoslovenska Pop Selekcija, and had also played with RTV Ljubljana Big Band.

September released their debut album, Zadnja avantura (The Last Adventure), at the beginning of 1976 through PGP-RTB record label. All the tracks on the album were written by Bončina, with the exception of the ballad "Ostavi trag" ("Leave a Mark"), which Bončina co-wrote with Time frontman Dado Topić. The album was praised by the music critics and the band's jazz rock sound brought them large attention of the media. The band represented Yugoslavia on youth festivals in the Soviet Union, East Germany and on Cuba. On 7 May 1976 the band performed on a concert in Studio M in Novi Sad alongside Korni Grupa, Drago Mlinarec, Tomaž Domicelj and Time. The concert was a part of the celebration of the Radio Novi Sad show Randevu s muzikom (Rendezvous with Music) twentieth anniversary, and the recordings from the concert were published on the live album Randevu s muzikom. Two September songs were featured on the album, a cover of Srce song "Gvendolina" and "Zadnja avantura". On 16 June of the same year September performed on the BOOM Festival held in Pionir Hall in Belgrade. The recording of their song "Noč kradljivaca" ("The Night of Thieves") appeared on the various artists live album BOOM '76. During the same year, the band performed in the Ljubljana Drama Theatre's production of John Arden's Live Like Pigs, starring singer Neca Falk.

At the end of 1977 Ugrin, Divjak and Novak left the band due to their obligations towards RTV Ljubljana Dance Orchestra. The new lineup of the band featured, besides Bončina, Asanović and Doblekar, guitarist Marijan Maliković (formerly of Kameleoni and Srce), bass guitarist Jadran Ogrin (formerly of Kameleoni) and drummer Nelfi Depangher (formerly of Faraoni). On their live performances they were occasionally joined by guitarist Vedran Božić (formerly of Time). At the beginning of 1978 the band performed in college campuses in the United States. In the United States the band recorded their second studio album. Domovina moja (My Homeland) was recorded in Seabird Recording Studio in Edgewater, Florida and produced by band members themselves. The album was released the following year through ZKP RTLJ record label. The songs for the album were written by Bončina and Asanović. Moja domovina brought less complex and more commercial sound than the band's previous release. With the introduction of guitar into the band's lineup, the sound had moved away from jazz towards hard rock and funk influences, and several songs featured polyphonic singing.

After the album release, the band started making plans for another United States tour, but unexpectedly decided to end their activity. They had their last concert in Zenica on 5 November 1979, in the lineup that featured Bončina, Asanović, Doblekar, guitarist Ante Mažuran, bass guitarist Dane Gančev and drummer Tone Dimnik.

=== Post breakup ===
After September disbanded, Bončina released four solo albums. In 1999 he released the album Bendologija (Bandology), which featured a collection of live recordings from various phases of his career, including recordings from September's 1978 performances in Florida. Asanović retired from performing, dedicating himself to music instruments business. Ugrin released jazz-oriented solo albums Samo muzika (Only Music, 1979) and Petar Ugrin & Ljubljana Jazz Selection (2003). In 1993 he was awarded the Prešern Fund Award. He died on 14 September 2001. As a studio musician, Novak played on more than 900 albums. He performed with Ljubljana Jazz Selection, but also with pop bands Gu Gu and Hot Hot Hot. With his wife, actress Damjana Golavšek (former member of the folk rock band Kladivo, Konj in Voda) he recorded the albums Rime (Rhymes, 1995) and Nasmeh (A Smile, 1999). The two also wrote children's music. From 1981 to 1983 Doblekar performed in the commercially successful band Hazard. He released jazz-oriented solo album Mir, prijateljstvo, ljubezen (Peace, Friendship, Love) in 1996 and produced works by other artists. He taught in Grosuplje Music School and formed Grosuplje Music School Big Band. In 2008 he formed the Braco J. Doblekar Orchestra with Bončina and a group of young musicians. The group released the album Janezz (a word play based on the word jazz and the popular Slovenian name Janez) in 2005, featuring songs composed by Doblekar and Bončina. Doblekar also formed the Big Band DOM, which released the album Doin' Basie's Thing in 2008. Ante Mažuran performed with Radio Television Zagreb Big Band and in the band Toranj 77 (Tower 77), recording the album Miting (Rally) with the latter. He wrote music for Branko Schmidt's 2001 film Queen of the Night. He died on 23 March 2020.

=== 2003 and 2012 reunions ===
In 2003 the compilation album The Best of September was released, followed by the band's reunion in the lineup that featured Janez Bončina (vocals), Tihomir "Pop" Asanović (organ), Braco Doblekar (percussion), Marijan Maliković (guitar), Jadran Ogrin (bass guitar), Ratomir "Ratko" Divjak (drums) and Tulio Furlanič (drums, vocals). The band held a tour across Slovenia and Croatia, finishing with a performance in Tivoli Hall in Ljubljana, where they performed as the opening band for Deep Purple.

In 2008, PGP-RTS reissued the album Zadnja avantura, featuring the songs "Prle upecao ribu" ("Prle Caught a Fish") and "Ljubav je prava stvar" ("Love Is the Real Thing"), both originally released on 7-inch singles, and the live version of "Noč kradljivaca" as bonus tracks.

In 2012 the group reunited to hold a concert in Cankar Centre in Ljubljana, held on 30 March. The lineup featured Bončina, Asanović. Doblekar, Maliković, Ogrin, Divjak and Novak. The recording of the concert was released on the video album Benč & September & prijatelji (Benč & September & Friends).

== Legacy ==
In 2017 producer 9th Wonder sampled September's 1976 song "Ostavi trag" for Kendrick Lamar's track "Duckworth".

== Members ==
- Janez Bončina "Benč" – vocals (1975–1979, 2003, 2012)
- Tihomir "Pop" Asanović – organ (1975–1979, 2003, 2012)
- Petar Ugrin – trumpet, violin (1975–1977)
- Čarli Novak – bass guitar (1975–1977, 2012)
- Ratomir "Ratko" Divjak – drums (1975–1977, 2003, 2012)
- Braco Doblekar – saxophone, percussion (1975–1979, 2003, 2012)
- Marijan Maliković – guitar (1977–1979, 2003, 2012)
- Jadran Ogrin – bass guitar (1977–1979, 2003, 2012)
- Nelfi Depangher – drums (1977–1979)
- Ante Mažuran – guitar (1979)
- Dani Gančev – bass guitar (1979)
- Tone Dimnik – drums (1979)
- Tulio Furlanič – drums, vocals (2003)

== Discography ==
=== Studio albums ===
- Zadnja avantura (1976)
- Domovino moja (1979)
- Florida (1979)

=== Compilation albums ===
- The Best of September (2003)

=== Video albums ===
- Benč & September & prijatelji (2012)

=== Singles ===
- "Mala vještica" / "Luduj s nama" (1976)
- "Prle upecao ribu" / "Ljubav je prava stvar" (1977)
- "Domovina moja" / "Za tvoj rođendan" (1978)

=== Other appearances ===
- "Noč kradljivaca" (BOOM '76, 1976)
- "Gvendolina" / "Zadnja avantura" (Randevu s muzikom, 1977)
