= Time (Yugoslav band) =

Rock band from Yugoslavia

- The original Time lineup, from left to right: Tihomir "Pop" Asanović, Vedran Božić, Dado Topić, Ratomir "Ratko" Divjak and Mario Mavrin

Background information
- Origin: Zagreb, SR Croatia, SFR Yugoslavia
- Genres: Progressive rock; jazz rock
- Years active: 1971–1977 (Reunions: 1987, 1998, 2001, 2007)
- Labels: Jugoton, PGP-RTB
- Past members: Dado Topić; Vedran Božić; Tihomir Asanović; Mario Mavrin; Ratko Divjak; Branislav Živković; Nenad Zubak; Karel Novak; Petar Petej; Ivan Stančić; Mladen Baraković; Chris Nicholls

Time was a Yugoslav rock band formed in Zagreb in 1971, widely considered one of the most prominent acts of the 1970s Yugoslav rock scene.

The band was formed by former Dinamiti and Korni Grupa vocalist Adolf "Dado" Topić. The first lineup featured, beside Topić, Vedran Božić (guitar), Tihomir "Pop" Asanović (keyboards), Mario Mavrin (bass guitar), Ratomir "Ratko" Divjak (drums) and Branislav "Labmert" Živković (piano and flute). The band gained large popularity and media attention with the release of their self-titled debut album in 1972—today considered one of the most important albums in the history of Yugoslav rock music—presenting themselves with jazz-influenced progressive rock sound. Despite the success of their debut release, the band did not manage to maintain a steady lineup, with Topić remaining the only permanent member during the following years. Despite experiencing multiple lineup changes and taking breaks, the band managed to release two additional studio albums that achieved moderate success, ultimately concluding their activities in 1977, making several reunions for live performances in the following decades.

== History ==
=== The beginnings (late 1960s–1971) ===
Vocalist Adolf "Dado" Topić started his career in the second half of the 1960s, as the bass guitarist for the high school band Đavolji Eliksiri (The Devil's Elixirs, named after the novel by E. T. A. Hoffmann), featuring guitarist Josip Boček. For a period of time, Đavolji Eliksiri featured Zoran Knežević on second guitar, who would later go on to become a renowned astronomer and the president of the Serbian Academy of Sciences and Arts. Topić and Boček later moved to the band Lavine (The Avalanches), and in 1967 joined the band Dinamiti, Topić switching to rhythm guitar and, at the same time, becoming the band's vocalist. Topić and Božić were members of the best known Dinamiti lineup, alongside bass guitarist Alberto Krasnići and drummer Ratomir "Ratko" Divjak. This lineup of the band moved from Dinamiti's initial sound towards progressive rock with Topić's compositions, jazz-influenced improvisations and covers of songs by foreign progressive rock acts. Topić's compositions like "Novine" ("Newspapers") and "Život moj" ("My Life") were in accordance with the emerging trends on the Yugoslav rock scene and were well received by the audience. The band's work and Topić's blues- and soul- influenced vocal style were also widely praised by the Yugoslav music press.

In 1969, Topić was invited to join Korni Grupa as the replacement for vocalist Dalibor Brun. He accepted, thus ending Dinamiti activity. Soon after, Korni Grupa was joined by Boček, who replaced guitarist Borko Kacl. Topić stayed with Korni Grupa for three years, recording a number of successful pop rock singles with the band and writing several progressive-oriented songs, like "Remember", "Žena je luka a čovek brod" ("Woman Is a Harbor and Man Is A Ship") and "Prvo svetlo u kući broj 4" ("The First Light in the House Number 4"), the latter co-written by Topić and the band's leader Kornelije Kovač. Although the songs had success on the band's live appearances, none of them was recorded by the band during the group's original run.

=== Formation, nationwide success, lineup changes and disbandment (1971–1977) ===
In September 1971, Topić left Korni Grupa to form his own band. With the help of manager Vladimir Mihaljek, he formed the first lineup of Time, featuring Topić on vocals, Vedran Božić on guitar, Tihomir "Pop" Asanović on keyboards, Mario Mavrin on bass guitar, Ratko Divjak on drums and Branislav "Lambert" Živković on piano and flute. All of the forming members were experienced musicians: Asanović previously played with the band Generals, Mavrin was previously a member of B.P. Convention, Divjak previously played with Topić in Dinamiti, and Živković was previously a member of Grupa 220. The most experienced was Božić: during the late 1960s, he performed with Zagreb bands Grešnici and Roboti, and later formed the band Wheels of Fire, which performed in West German music clubs. On one occasion, in a Frankfurt club, Wheels of Fire were joined on stage by Jimi Hendrix, who performed several songs with the band. After Wheels of Fire disbanded, Božić played with the bands Mi, Nautilus, and B.P. Convention.

In mid-1972, Time released their self-titled debut album through Jugoton record label. Most of the songs on the album were written by Topić during the time he spent with Korni Grupa. The album featured five tracks: "Istina mašina" ("Truth Machine"), which would go on to become a large hit, the ballad "Pjesma No. 3" ("Song No. 3"), "Hegedupa upa", which featured Topić's scat singing, the jazz oriented "Kralj alkohol" ("King Alcohol"), which was composed by Topić's former Dinamiti bandmate Alberto Krasnići, and the rock epic "Za koji život treba da se rodim" ("For Which Life Should I Be Born"). Initially, Jugoton executives, doubting the album's commercial potential, decided to issue only 500 copies of the record. However, after the surprising success the album had with the audience, it was reissued in a larger number of copies and would continue to be reissued on several occasions during the following two decades.

Following the album release, Time played a number of well-received concerts across Yugoslavia. The band performed on the 1972 edition of BOOM Festival, held in Tivoli Hall in Ljubljana, a live version of "Za koji život treba da se rodim" appearing on the double live album Pop Festival Ljubljana 72 recorded on the festival. The band also performed as the opening act on Colosseum concert in Zagreb. However, despite the success of the album and the live performances, at the beginning of 1973, Mavrin and Živković left the band, their departure marking the beginning of frequent lineup changes. During the following period, Nenad Zubak (formerly of Grupa 220), Karel "Čarli" Novak (formerly of Generals, Srce and September) and Topić himself took turns on bass guitar. Soon after Mavrin's and Živković's departure, Divjak also left the band. His spot was filled in by Petar "Peco" Petej, a graduate from the Graz University of Music and Performing Arts, formerly of Delfini and Indexi. During the following years, Petej would remain one of the rare permanent members of Time, but was on live performances occasionally replaced by Ivan "Piko" Stančić. The unsteady lineup resulted in unusual live performances: on one occasion, the band performed live in Osijek featuring only Topić on vocals and bass guitar and Petej on drums, and on another occasion they performed in Split without Topić, featuring Asanović, Petej and Mladen Baraković (bass guitar).

During 1973, Topić and Božić spent several months performing in West Germany, and Asanović joined Novi Fosili on their tour across the Soviet Union. After Asanović returned to Yugoslavia, he formed the band Jugoslovenska Pop Selekcija (Yugoslav Pop Selection). Topić returned to Yugoslavia soon after, joining Asanović's band, continuing simultaneously to lead Time. Both Time and Jugoslovenska Pop Selekcija, alongside singer Josipa Lisac and band Porodična Manufaktura Crnog Hleba, represented Yugoslavia on the 10th World Festival of Youth and Students in East Berlin, where Asanović was awarded for his composition "Berlin". During 1973, Time released the 7-inch single with the hit song "Makedonija" ("Macedonia"), performed as the opening band for the British group East of Eden on their Austrian tour, and performed on the third edition of BOOM Festival, the live version of the song "Reci mi Ciganko, što u mome dlanu piše" ("Tell Me, Gypsy Woman, What Do You Read from My Palm"), originally released on a 7-inch single, appearing on the double live album Boom Pop Fest '73.

At the beginning of 1974, Topić released his first solo record, a 7-inch single with the songs "Život moj" ("My Life") and "(Alone) In My Room", the latter being a cover of Verdelle Smith's song, and took part in the recording of Asanović's solo album Majko zemljo (Mother Earth). Later during the year, he was arrested for avoiding to report to serve his mandatory stint in the Yugoslav People's Army and was sentenced to several months in prison. It was later revealed that he was a victim of a show trial, which was the result of his conflict with a group of young members of the League of Socialist Youth. The conflict erupted when Time were hired to perform on the closing party of the League of Socialist Youth congress in Zagreb. At some point, some of the League members started to tear Time's amplifiers with broken bottles. They were insulted by Topić, and two days later he was arrested. While serving his sentence, he wrote the songs which would appear on Time's second studio album.

The album Time II was recorded after Topić was released for prison. The recording featured Topić, Asanović, Divjak and guitarist Dragi Jelić of YU Grupa. Jelić was at the time serving his army stint in Ljubljana, and used his army leaves to take part in the album recording. The album marked Time's shift towards less complex sound with the songs "Alfa Romeo GTA", "Dok ja i moj miš sviramo jazz" ("While Me and My Mouse Are Playing Jazz"), and "Živjeti slobodno" ("Living Freely"), the latter inspired by the prison life. The album also featured the ballads "Divlje guske" ("Wild Geese"), which was written on the lyrics of poet Desanka Maksimović, "Balada o 2000." ("Ballad of the Year 2000"), composed by Topić's former bandmate from Dinamiti Alberto Krasnići, and "Da li znaš da te volim" ("Did You Know That I Love You"), which would go on to become a nationwide hit. After the album was recorded, in November 1974, Topić went to serve his army stint in Celje.

The album was released while Topić was still in the army. Upon returning from the army in October 1975, Topić gathered a group of musicians in order to promote the album. After a small number of promotional concerts, he moved to London, where he was soon followed by Petej. The two joined one of the incarnations of The Foundations, playing 43 concerts across England with the group. In January 1976, The Foundations went on a Yugoslav tour, after which Topić and Petej decided to remain in Yugoslavia and reform Time. They were soon joined by another former Foundations member, English keyboardist Christopher "Chris" Nicholls, who left the group after an argument with other members. Nicholls initially planned to stay in Yugoslavia for only several months, but ended up spending three years in the country. The new lineup of Time performed on the 1976 edition of BOOM Festival, held in Pionir Hall in Belgrade, the live version of the song "Da li znaš da te volim" appearing on the live album BOOM '76.

In 1976, Topić recorded the third Time album in Munich with Vedran Božić on guitar, Karel Novak on bass guitar, Chris Nicholls on keyboards, Ratko Divjak and Piko Stančić on drums and Zdenka Kovačiček on backing vocals. The record, released under the title Život u čizmama sa visokom petom (Life in the High-Heeled Boots), was a concept album describing the rise and fall of a rock star. The album brought the hits "Rock 'n' roll u Beogradu" ("Rock 'n' roll in Belgrade") and "Superstar".

During the following two years, Topić held a number of concerts, often advertised as Time's farewell performances. On 7 May 1976, the band performed on a concert in Studio M in Novi Sad alongside September, Korni Grupa, Drago Mlinarec and Tomaž Domicelj. The concert was a part of the celebration of the Radio Novi Sad show Randevu s muzikom (Rendezvous with Music) twentieth anniversary, and the recordings from the concert were published on the double live album Randevu s muzikom, released in 1977. Time appeared on the album with the songs "Život u čizmama sa visokom petom" and "Divlje guske". The band had one of their last performances on a festival held in Belgrade's Pinki Hall in 1977. The live album Pop parada 1 (Pop Parade 1) was recorded on the concert, featurimg Time's songs "Rock 'n' roll u Beogradu", "Dok ja i moj miš sviramo džez" and "Da li znaš da te volim". At the end of 1977, there were plans for the formation of a supergroup called K2, which should have featured, beside Topić, Novak and Divjak, Josip Boček, Sloba Marković and Kornelije Kovač, but this idea failed. Soon after, Petej and Božić started working as studio musicians, and Time officially ended their activity.

=== Post breakup and later activities by the band members (1977–present) ===
After Time officially disbanded, Topić and Nicholls joined the Belgrade band Ribeli, which changed the name to Mama Co Co after their arrival. The band regularly performed in Belgrade Youth Center and performed as the backing band for Zdravko Čolić on his Putujući zemljotres (Travelling Earthquake) tour, much to dislike of a great number of Time fans which did not approve of Topić performing with a pop star. In 1979, Topić recorded the hit song "Floyd", composed by Zoran Simjanović and released on the soundtrack album for Goran Marković's film National Class Category Up to 785 ccm. Later that year, he released his first solo album, a concept album entitled Neosedlani (The Unsaddled), the recording of which featured Boček, Divjak, Novak and Nicholls. In 1980, he released his second studio album, Šaputanja na jastuku (Pillow Talks), the recording of which featured Nicholls on keyboards. After the release of the mini-album Vodilja (Guiding Star) in 1983, he turned to performing on Yugoslav pop festivals. In 1984, he recorded the hit ballad "Princeza" ("Princess") with singer Slađana Milošević. In 1993, he released the EP Call It Love, followed by the studio albums Otok u moru tišine (Island in the Sea of Silence, 2002) and Apsolutno sve (Absolutely Everything, 2004) and the live album Live in Kerempuh (2008). He appeared on a large number of albums by artists from former Yugoslav republics.

Boček performed with the band's Supersession, Boomerang and Parni Valjak, as well as with the club bands Call 66, Telephone Blues Band, Retro Guru, and Rock Masters, recording the albums Planet Hendrix (2015) and Planet Cream (2020) with the latter, simultaneously working as a producer. He has received several prominent awards for his work.

Mario Mavrin performed with a number of jazz musicians from all over the world. He was a member of the group B.P. Convention. With guitarist Damir Dičić, he recorded the album Out of the Past (1987). He was awarded the Status Award for the Best Bass Guitarist on two occasions, in 1997 and 1998.

Divjak played with the Dance Ochestra of RTV Ljubljana, B.P. Convention, Pop Jazz Ljubljana, Greentown Jazz Band and other ensembles. He was a member of the jazz rock band Sončna Pot (Sun Path), recording their 1979 self-titled album with them. In 1999, he released the solo album Caravan, recorded with a group of young Slovenian musicians. He was a member of the Bruno Mičetić Jazz Trio, recording the album Phantom's Whispers (2013) with the group.

Živković, during the late 1970s, led the bands B.P. Convention, Lambert Shop, and Jazz Set. He wrote music for a number of Yugoslav films, including Whichever Way the Ball Bounces, Crazy Days, The Rat Savior, Bravo maestro, You Love Only Once and In the Jaws of Life, winning the Golden Arena for Best Film Music at the Pula Film Festival for the latter. He worked as a professor of film music at the New York University. He released solo albums Moods for Flutes (1982), Emotionally (1986), Authentic South America Vol.2 – Peru & Bolivia (1993) and Authentic South America Vol.4 – Bolivia / Peru / Paraguay (1993). In 2012, he was awarded the Honorable Recognition Award for lifetime achievement by RTV Slovenija.

Nicholls performed with the Yugoslav bands Mama Co Co, Ružin Trn (Rose Thorn) and Cveće. In 1987, he moved to Germany, where he still resides, working as a studio musician. For a period of time he worked as a teacher in a jazz music school in Düsseldorf.

=== Reunions (1987, 1998, 2001, 2007) ===
In 1987, Time reunited to perform on the Retrovizor (Rear-view Mirror) festival, organized by Radio 101 and held in Zagreb's House of Sports on 22 May. The reunited Time featured Dado Topić (vocals, bass guitar), Tihomir Asanović (keyboards), Branislav Živković (keyboards) and Ratko Divjak (drums), with a guest performance by Dragi Jelić on guitar. On the festival, Time performed alongside YU Grupa, Indexi, Drago Mlinarec, Radomir Mihajlović Točak Band and Korni Grupa, the latter also reuniting for this occasion. The live versions of the songs "Rock 'n' roll u Beogradu", with altered title, "Rock 'n' roll u Zagrebu" ("Rock 'n' roll in Zagreb"), "Pjesma No. 3", "Da li znaš da te volim" and "Majko zemljo", the latter featuring guest appearance by Janez Bončina "Benč" appeared on the various artists double live album Legende YU rocka (Legends of YU Rock), released during the same year.

In 1998 and 2001, Topić, Božić and Divjak reunited for a limited number of live performances. In 2007, Time, in the lineup featuring Topić, Božić and Divjak, reunited to perform as an opening band on The Rolling Stones concert held on Jaz Beach in Budva, Montenegro on 9 July 2007.

In the summer of 2016, it was announced that Time would reunite in the lineup featuring Topić, Asanović, Božić, Mavrin and Divjak for a concert in Belgrade. However, the planned concert was soon cancelled due to the disagreements between band members. In 2020, following Croatia Records reissue of Time's debut album, Dado Topić announced the band's comeback tour, but the COVID-19 pandemic put a stop to the planned reunion.

In 2007, Croatia Records released the double compilation album Ultimate Collection, with one disc featuring Time songs, and the other featuring Dado Topić's solo works. In 2012, the group was awarded with Porin Lifetime Achievement Award. In 2019, Croatia Records released remastered version of the band's debut album on vinyl, accompanied by texts of music critics Peca Popović, Zlatko Gall and Nikola Knežević.

== Legacy ==
Time song "Tin i Tina" ("Tin and Tina") was covered by Yugoslav girl group Aska on their 1982 album Disco Rock. The song "Da li znaš da te volim" was covered by Serbian and Yugoslav singer-songwriter Srđan Marjanović on his 1989 album Ako jednom puknem ja (If I Fall into Pieces One Day). The same song was covered by Yugoslav and Croatian musician Massimo Savić on his 1995 album "Benzina". The song "Istina mašina" was covered by Yugoslav and Serbian rock band Ekatarina Velika on their 1993 album Neko nas posmatra (Somebody Is Watching Us). The same song was covered by Yugoslav and Serbian hard rock band Generacija 5 on their 2002 live album Unplugged & Live. The song "Superstar" was covered by Serbian musician Lee Man on his 1996 album Panonski ljubavnik (Pannonian Lover). Serbian female string quartet Wonder Strings recorded instrumental version of "Makedonija", "Floyd" and "Da li znaš da te volim" for their 2016 album Wonder YU Rock!. Montenegrin band Mikrokozma recorded a cover of "Za koji život treba da se rodim" on their 2022 live album Ono što jesmo (What We Are). Croatian punk rock band Brkovi released the album entitled Torzo Dade Topića (Dado Topić's Torso) in 2016.

In 1998, Time's debut self-titled album was polled as the No.3 and the album Time II was polled No.52 on the list of 100 Greatest Yugoslav Popular Music Albums in the book YU 100: najbolji albumi jugoslovenske rok i pop muzike (YU 100: The Best albums of Yugoslav pop and rock music). In 2015, the band's debut album was polled No.21 on the list of 100 Greatest Yugoslav Albums published by the Croatian edition of Rolling Stone.

In 2000, "Za koji život treba da se rodim" was polled No.4, "Da li znaš da te volim" was polled No.29, "Rock 'n' roll u Beogradu" was polled No.46, "Makedonija" was polled No.61 and "Istina mašina" was polled No.83 on the Rock Express Top 100 Yugoslav Rock Songs of All Times list. In 2006, "Da li znaš da te volim" was polled No.30 and "Rock 'n' roll u Beogradu" was polled No.62 on the B92 Top 100 Yugoslav songs list.

The lyrics of the songs "Za koji život treba da se rodim", "Pjesma No.3" and "Istina mašina" are featured in Petar Janjatović's book Pesme bratstva, detinjstva & potomstva: Antologija ex YU rok poezije 1967 - 2007 (Songs of Brotherhood, Childhood & Offspring: Anthology of Ex YU Rock Poetry 1967 – 2007).

== Discography ==
=== Studio albums ===
- Time (1972)
- Time II (1975)
- Život u čizmama sa visokom petom (1976)

=== Compilation albums ===
- Time & Dado Topić – Ultimate Collection (2007)

=== Singles ===
- "Život moj" / Pjesma No.3" (1973)
- "Reci Ciganko, što mi u dlanu piše" / Makedonija" (1973)
- "Kad jednom otkrijem čovjeka u sebi" / "Da li znaš da te volim" (1975)
- "Tin i Tina" / "Dok sjedim ovako u tvojoj blizini" (1976)
- "Kad smo ja i moj miš bili bokseri" / "Dok ja i moj miš sviramo jazz" (1976)
- "Poželi nešto" / "Superstar" (1976)

=== Other appearances ===
- "Za koji život treba da se rodim" (Pop Festival Ljubljana 72; 1972)
- "Reci Ciganko, što mi u dlanu piše" (Boom Pop Fest '73; 1973)
- "Da li znaš da te volim" (BOOM '76; 1976)
- "Život u čizmama sa visokom petom" / "Divlje guske" (Randevu s muzikom; 1977)
- "Rock 'n' roll u Beogradu" / "Dok ja i moj miš sviramo džez" / "Da li znaš da te volim" (Pop parada 1; 1977)
- "Rock 'n' roll u Zagrebu" / "Pjesma No. 3" / "Da li znaš da te volim" / "Majko zemljo" (Legende YU rocka; 1987)
