= Kameleoni =

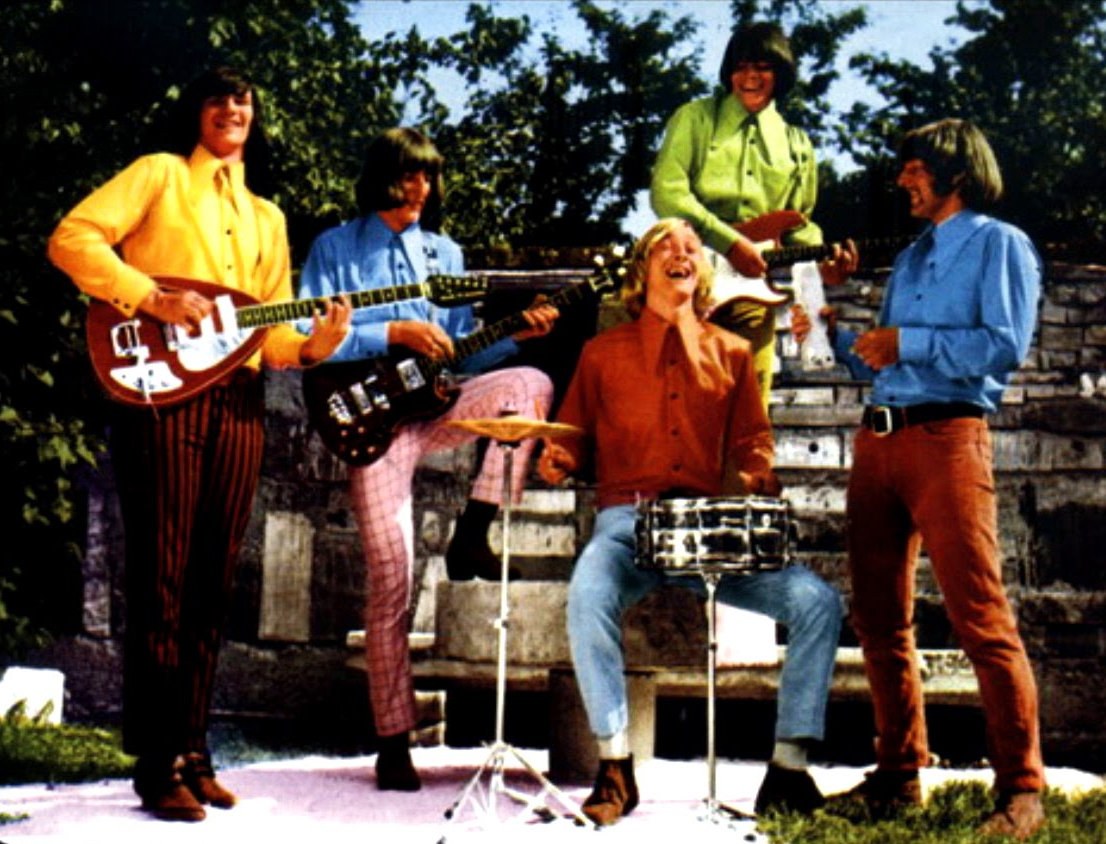
- Kameleoni in 1967

Background information
- Origin: Koper, SR Slovenia, SFR Yugoslavia
- Genres: Beat music; rhythm and blues; psychedelic rock
- Years active: 1965–1969; 1981–1982; 1994–1995
- Labels: Diskos, Jugoton, Beograd Disk, ZKP RTLJ, Helidon, ZKP RTVS, Croatia Records
- Past members: Danilo Kocjančič; Marjan Malikovič; Jadran Ogrin; Tulio Furlanič; Vanja Valič; Goran Tavčar; Ivan Mojzer

Kameleoni (trans. The Chameleons) were a Slovenian and Yugoslav rock band formed in Koper in 1965. They were among the pioneers of the Yugoslav rock scene.

Soon after the formation, the band gained the attention of the audience and the media and achieved nationwide popularity. However, despite the success, the disagreements within the band led to split into two factions in 1968, both of them ending their activity in 1969. At the beginning of the 1980s, the band reunited and re-recorded some of their old songs, releasing them on their first studio album. They made another brief reunion in the mid-1990s, recording and releasing their second studio album.

== History ==
=== The beginnings and rise to fame (1965-1968) ===
Kameleoni were formed in September 1965 by Danilo Kocjančič (rhythm guitar), Marjan Malikovič (guitar), Jadran Ogrin (bass guitar), and Tulio Furlanič (drums), with the vocal duties being shared by all members. At the time of the band formation, all of the members were high school students and attended Kopar music school, but none of them studied the instrument he played in the band. The group chose their name after, during a walk in Kopar streets, one of them spotted an advertisement for Camel cigarettes and started repeating the name of the brand, to which another member added "Kameleoni" ("Chameleons"). The band had their debut live appearance at the end of 1965 in Youth Club in Kopar. Following the concert, they were joined by keyboardist Vanja Valič. During the following period, they performed extensively, holding about 200 concerts, mostly in Kopar and nearby towns. Owing to the growing popularity, they were invited to perform in Tivoli Hall in Ljubljana on the 1966 Ice Hockey World Championships closing ceremony.

In the spring of 1966, at the Championship of Yugoslav Ensembles festival held in Zagreb they shared first place with the already prominent Roboti, and Furlanič won the first prize in the vocalists category. Their song "Sjaj izgubljene ljubavi" ("Spark of the Lost Love") contributed largely to their success on the festival. This success enabled them to record several songs for Radio Kopar, and to perform across Yugoslavia, soon gaining the reputation of competent instrumentalists. The band also performed in Austria and Italy, holding a number of performances in the famous Piper club in Milan.

In early 1967, they released their first record, the EP Le Felicita, through Diskos record label. The EP featured the title track, the songs "Looking for Me" and "Sjaj izgubljene ljubavi", and a cover of The Animals version of the blues standard "See See Rider". After the EP was released, it caused a minor scandal. The lyrics of the song "Sjaj izgubljene ljubavi", credited to the band members on the EP, carried much similarity to the lyrics of the song "Neka to bude u proljeće" ("May It Happen in the Springtime"), which won the first prize at the 1966 Opatija Festival. The author of "Neka to bude u proljeće" lyrics, Ljiljana Petrović, publicly claimed that Kameleoni plagiarised her lyrics. Eventually, music magazine Džuboks revealed that both Kameleoni and Petrović used verses from the poem "Ode: Intimations of Immortality" by English Romantic poet William Wordsworth.

The scandal did not affect Kameleoni's popularity. They signed for the biggest Yugoslav record label, Jugoton, releasing their second EP, Dedicated to the One I Love, at the beginning of 1967. Beside the title track, which was a cover of The "5" Royales song, the album featured a cover of The Kinks song "Too Much on My Mind" and two of Kameleoni's own songs, "Gdje si, ljubavi" ("Where Are You, My Love") and "The Story of My Brown Friend". In the spring of 1967, the band held a sold-out concert in Ljubljana's Tivoli Hall and won the first place on the Second Festival of Yugoslav Vocal-Instrumental Ensembles in Zagreb. At the time, the band enjoyed the reputation of the best performers of foreign hits among Yugoslav bands, with part of the Yugoslav music press criticizing them for lack of authenticity, but most of it praising their musicianship.

=== Split into two factions and end of activity (1968-1969) ===
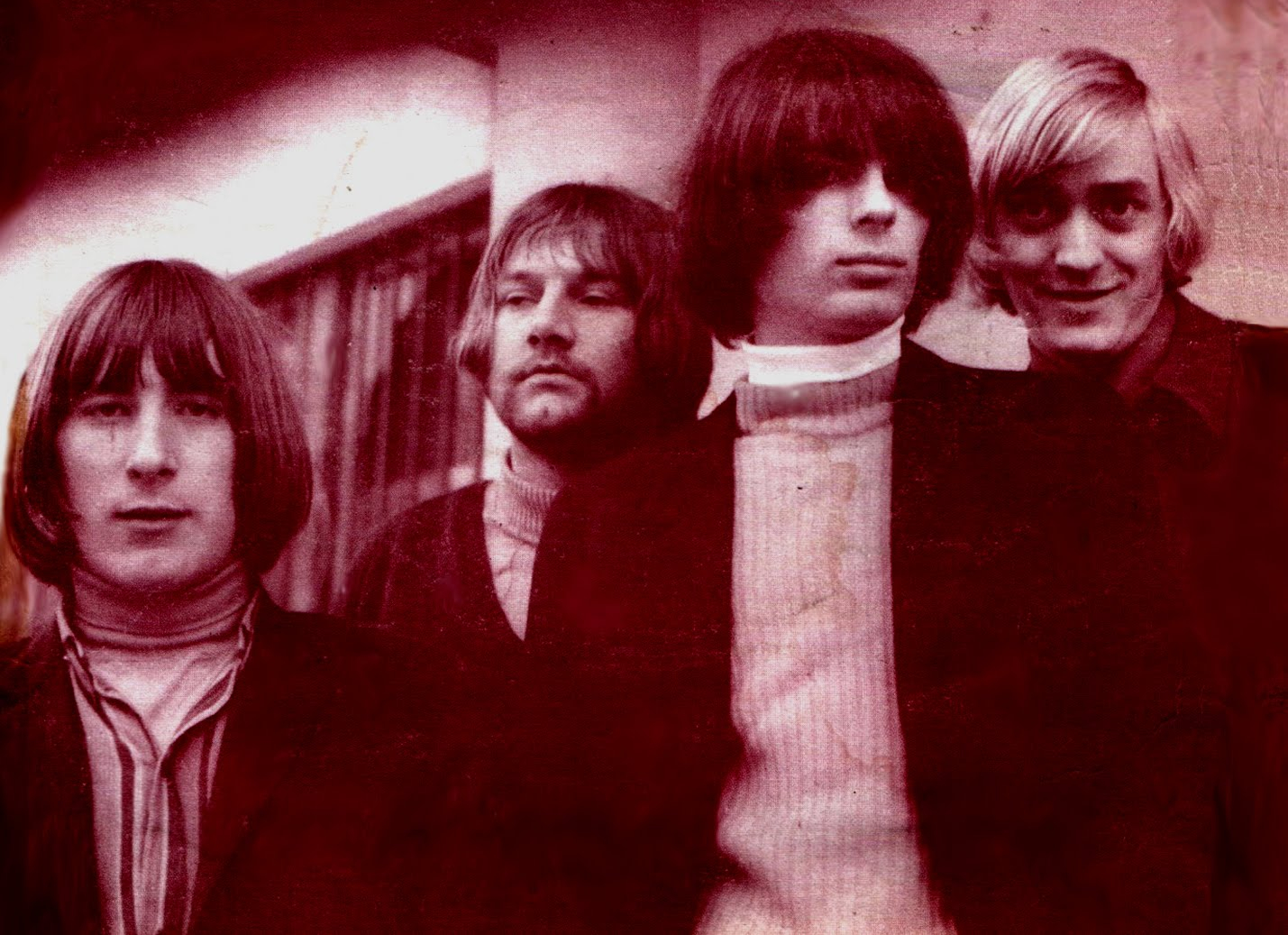
The Ogrin–Valič–Furlanič faction of Kameleoni in 1968

Despite the success, at the beginning of 1968, dissatisfaction with the share of the profits led to split into two factions, both of them performing under the name Novi Kameleoni (The New Chameleons). One faction featured Jadran Ogrin, Vanja Valič and Tulio Furlanič, who were joined by guitarist Goran Tavčar. They wrote psychedelic-oriented music for Boštjan Hladnik's 1968 film The Sunny Whirlpool, releasing it on the EP Sunny Cry (the title of the EP being the literal translation of the film's Slovenian language title). After the release of the EP, Furlanič left the band due to his mandatory stint in the Yugoslav army, and was replaced by Ivan Mojzer. At the time, the band had made a complete shift from their initial beat sound towards Cream- and Jimi Hendrix Experience-influenced psychedelic rock, their shows now being accompanied by a light show. The band's new sound was met with mixed reactions by the audience. However, the new incarnation of the band was short-lasting. After Tavčar moved to Italy, the band continued with a new guitarist, Ilario Udovici. After Mojzer left the band to serve his mandatory army stint, they were rejoined by Furlanič. In 1969, they performed on the Belgrade Gitarijada festival. Owing to the festival perormance, the recorded a split 7-inch single entitled Gitarijada 69 with the band Bezimeni from Skopje. One side of the single featured Kameleoni song "Moon Moan (Lunino stokanje)", while the other featured Bezimeni's cover of the traditional song "Si zaljubiv edno mome" ("I'm in Love with a Girl"). Kameleoni also went on a one-month tour across Yugoslavia with three other finalists of Gitarijada festival – Exodus from Herceg Novi, Dogovor iz 1804. from Belgrade and Inkvizicija from Maribor. However, personnel changes and disagreements within the group led to disbandment in 1969. The band held their last concert in Maribor at the end of 1969.

The other faction of the group was led by Danilo Kocjančič, who fronted the band consisting of musicians from Slovenia and Italy: Drago Dellabernardina (guitar), Gabriele Lorenzi (keyboards), Voltheo Moretto (bass guitar). and Aldo Berliaffa (drums). The group did not achieve any larger success, and ended its activity in 1969.

=== Post breakup ===
Throughout the following years, the members of Kameleoni continued their career in other groups. Malikovič performed with Faraoni, Srce, Mladi Levi and September. In 1982, he formed the band Karamela (Caramel) with Zlati Klun. One of the band's lineups included vocalist Boris Krmac (later of Pomaranča fame). The band released the albums Najelpša so jutra (The Most Beautiful Are the Mornings, 1998) and Brez strahu (No Fear, 2017). Danilo Kocjančič was a member of the bands Boomerang, Labirinit, Prizma and Bazar. As vocalist, bass guitarist and songwriter he recorded two studio albums with Prizma, Pogum (Courage, 1979) and Junak zadnje strane (Back-page Hero, 1983). With Bazar he recorded their 1986 self-titled album. Jadran Ogrin performed with Boomerag and September. Furlanič perfmormed with Faraoni for a period of time, before moving abroad, later performing across Europe with club bands Mariner and Impexus. Vanja Valič retired from music, and spent the following years working as the director of sportscasts at TV Ljubljana.

=== 1981 and 1994 reunions ===
The band made a brief reunion in order to perform on a fund-raising concert in Portorož's Avditorij, held on 21 August 1981. The success of the concert led to a tour across Yugoslav republics of Slovenia and Croatia. Following the tour, they made recordings of some of their previously unrecorded songs and re-recorded some of the songs from their 1960s EPs, releasing the material on the album Kameleoni in 1982.

In the mid-1990s, Kameleoni reunited once again, releasing two albums – the compilation album Kameleoni 66-67 (1994) and the studio album Za vse generacije (For All Generations, 1995), the latter featuring their new, mainstream rock-oriented material. The release of the band's second studio album was accompanied by the publication of the group's biography, written by Franko Hmeljak and entitled Kameleoni 1965–1995.

=== Post renuions ===
Following the band's second reunion, Kocjančič, Ogrin and Furlanič, with guitarist Zdenko Cotić, formed the band Halo (Hello). The group recorded studio albums Anita ni nikoli... (Anita Never..., 1997) and Kaj je novega (What's New, 1999), and the live album Halo v živo (Hello Live, 2003). Kocjančič released the albums Danilo & Friends (1996) and Sve moje ljubezni (All My Loves, 1999), featuring his old songs in new musical arrangements, performed by popular Slovenian singers. In 2005, he released the solo album Danilo posle Kocjančiča (Danilo after Kocjančič). He died on 3 February 2013.

In 2006, ZKP RTVS released a reissue of Kameleoni 1982 self-titled album. The compilation album The Ultimate Collection, released by Croatia Records in 2011, includes the band's 1960s recordings, as well as previously unreleased covers of songs by The Beatles, The Rolling Stones, The Troggs and other acts. The songs from the band's 1982 debut album were included as the bonus disc.

In 2009, premiered a television documentary about the band, directed by Slvako Hren and entitled Zlata šezdeseta – nostalgija z beatniki: Kameleoni in Danilo Kocjančič (Golden Sixties – Nostalgia with Beatniks: Kameleoni and Danilo Kocjančič). Another documentary about the group, directed by Miha Čelar and entitled Kameleoni – Beatlesi nekdanje Jugoslavije (Kameleoni – The Beatles of Former Yugoslavia), premiered in 2018.

== Discography ==
=== Studio albums ===
- Kameleoni (1982)
- Za vse generacije (1995)

=== EPs ===
- La Felicita (1967)
- Dedicated to the One I Love (1967)
- Sunny Cry (1968)

=== Singles ===
- Gitarijada '69 (split single, with Bezimeni, 1969)

=== Compilation albums ===
- Kameleoni 66-67 (1994)
- The Ultimate Collection (2011)
