= Faraoni =

Faraoni may refer to:

- Davide Faraoni, Italian footballer
- Faraoni (band), Slovenian and Yugoslav rock and pop band
- La donna dei faraoni, Italian film
