= Time (Time album) =

Studio album by Time
- Released: 1972
- Genres: Progressive rock, jazz rock
- Language: Croatian
- Label: Jugoton
- Producer: Vladimir Vihaljek

Time chronology
Time (1972)	Time II (1975)

Time is the debut album by the Yugoslavian rock group Time, released in 1972 by Jugoton.

The album was polled in 1998 as number 3 on the list of 100 greatest Yugoslav rock and pop albums in the book YU 100: najbolji albumi jugoslovenske rok i pop muzike (YU 100: The Best albums of Yugoslav pop and rock music).

== Track listing ==
All lyrics are written by Dado Topić; all music is composed by Dado Topić, except where noted.

A side
No.	Title	Length
1.	"Istina mašina"	4:40
2.	"Pjesma no. 3"	5:54
3.	"Hegedupa upa"	5:15

B side
No.	Title	Music	Length
4.	"Kralj alkohol"	Alberto Krasnić	6:53
5.	"Za koji život treba da se rodim"		10:05
Total length:			32:47

CD reissue
No.	Title	Music	Length
4.	"Da li znaš da te volim"		6:06
5.	"Kralj alkohol"	Krasnić	6:53
6.	"Za koji život treba da se rodim"		10:05
7.	"Makedonija"		4:55
Total length:			43:48

- On the digital reissue, "Da li znaš da te volim" is featured as track 6, moving the other tracks up by one position.

== Personnel ==
- Dado Topić - vocals; bass and acoustic guitar (track 3)
- Vedran Božić - guitar
- Tihomir "Pop" Asanović - keyboards, hammond organ; synthesizers and melloton (track 3)
- Brane Živković Lambert - piano, flute
- Mario Mavrin - bass
- Ratko Divjak - drums; congas (track 3)
