= Croatia in the Eurovision Song Contest 2008 =

- Eurovision Song Contest 2008
- Participating broadcaster: Hrvatska radiotelevizija (HRT)
- Country: Croatia
- Selection process: Dora 2008
- Selection date: 23 February 2008

Competing entry
- Song: "Romanca"
- Artist: Kraljevi ulice and 75 cents
- Songwriters: Miran Hadži Veljković

Placement
- Semi-final result: Qualified (4th, 112 points)
- Final result: 21st, 44 points

Participation chronology

Croatia was represented at the Eurovision Song Contest 2008 with the song "Romanca", written by Miran Hadži Veljković, and performed by the band Kraljevi ulice and 75 Cents. The Croatian participating broadcaster, Hrvatska radiotelevizija (HRT), organised the national final Dora 2008 to select its entry for the contest. A total of twenty-four entries competed in the national final which consisted of two shows: a semi-final and a final. In the semi-final on 22 February 2008, six entries qualified to compete in the final on 23 February 2008 alongside ten pre-qualified songs. In the final, "Romanca" performed by Kraljevi ulice and 75 Cents was selected as the winner following the combination of votes from a five-member jury panel and a public televote.

Croatia was drawn to compete in the second semi-final of the Eurovision Song Contest which took place on 22 May 2008. Performing during the show in position 11, "Romanca" was announced among the 10 qualifying entries of the second semi-final and therefore qualified to compete in the final on 24 May. It was later revealed that Croatia placed fourth out of the 19 participating countries in the semi-final with 112 points. In the final, Croatia performed in position 9 and placed twenty-first out of the 25 participating countries, scoring 44 points.

== Background ==
Prior to the 2008 contest, Hrvatska radiotelevizija (HRT) had participated in the Eurovision Song Contest representing Croatia fifteen times since its first entry in 1993. Its best result in the contest was fourth, achieved on two occasions: in 1996 with the song "Sveta ljubav" performed by Maja Blagdan and in 1999 with the song "Marija Magdalena" performed by Doris Dragović. Following the introduction of semi-finals for the 2004 contest, Croatia had thus far featured in three finals. In 2007, Croatia failed to qualify to the final with "Vjerujem u ljubav" by Dragonfly featuring Dado Topić.

As part of its duties as participating broadcaster, HRT organises the selection of its entry in the Eurovision Song Contest and broadcasts the event in the country. The broadcaster confirmed its participation in the 2008 contest on 27 November 2007. Since 1993, HRT organised the national final Dora in order to select its entry for the Eurovision Song Contest, a method that was continued for its 2008 participation.

== Before Eurovision ==
=== Dora 2008 ===
Dora 2008 was the sixteenth edition of the national selection Dora organised by HRT to select its entry for the Eurovision Song Contest 2008. The competition consisted of a semi-final and a final on 22 and 23 February 2008, both taking place at the Hotel Kvarner in Opatija. The semi-final was broadcast on HRT 2, while the final was broadcast on HRT 1. Both shows were also broadcast via radio on HR 2 and online via the broadcaster's website hrt.hr, while the final was also streamed online via the official Eurovision Song Contest website eurovision.tv.

==== Format ====
A total of twenty-four songs competed in Dora 2008 which consisted of two shows: a semi-final and a final. Fourteen of the songs were selected from open submissions and competed in the semi-final with public televoting selecting the top six to proceed to the final. In the final, the six qualifying songs in the semi-final alongside an additional ten pre-qualified songs competed and the winner was selected by votes from the public and a jury panel. Ties in the final were decided in favour of the entry that received the most points from the jury.

==== Competing entries ====
On 3 December 2007, HRT opened a submission period where artists and composers were able to submit their entries to the broadcaster with the deadline on 18 December 2007. Over 200 entries were received by the broadcaster during the submission period. A five-member expert committee consisting of Silvije Glojnarić (HRT), Robert Urlić (HR), Branko Uvodić (HTV), Željen Klašterka (HTV) and Aleksandar Kostadinov (HTV) reviewed the received submissions and selected sixteen artists and songs for the semi-final of the competition, while the ten pre-qualifying songs for the final were written by composers invited by HRT in consultation with the Croatian Composers' Society (HDS). The composers also selected the performer for their entry. The invited composers were announced on 30 December 2007 and were:

- Ante Pecotić
- Denis Dumančić
- Hari Rončević
- Husein Hasanefendić
- Miro Buljan
- Miroslav Škoro
- Nenad Ninčević
- Rajko Dujmić
- Tamara Obrovac
- Željko Banić

HRT announced the entries competing in the semi-final on 2 January 2008 and among the artists was Emilija Kokić, who won Eurovision for Yugoslavia in 1989 as a member of Riva. The pre-qualified entries competing in the final were announced on 9 January 2009 and among the pre-qualified artists was Maja Blagdan who represented Croatia in 1996. On 9 and 16 February 2008, the competing artists performed their entries live during the preview programme Ususret dori broadcast on HRT 1.

Artist	Song	Songwriter(s)	Selection
Alen Islamović	"Mirno spava kosa plava"	Rajko Dujmić, Nenad Ninčević	Invited by HRT
Antonija Šola	"Gdje je srce tu je dom"	Antonija Šola, Silvio Pasarić	Open submission
Bonaca and Nera	"Tvoje oko ka' more duboko"	Ivo Mikulčin	Open submission
Ðani Stipaničev	"Ja san umra za ljubav"	Miro Buljan, Nenad Ninčević	Open submission
Danijela Pintarić	"Dotakni zvijezdu"	Zoran Jeager, Srđan Sekulović Skansi	Open submission
Dino Dvornik and Bane	"Milina"	Željko Banić	Invited by HRT
Dye and the Colors	"Zažmirim i putujem"	Husein Hasanefendić	Invited by HRT
Emilija Kokić	"Anđeo"	Emilija Kokić	Open submission
Giuliano	"Plava vještica"	Miro Buljan, Nenad Ninčević	Invited by HRT
Hari Rončević	"Ležim na suncu"	Hari Rončević	Invited by HRT
Ibrica Jusić	"Iskoci sa mnom iz jureceg vlaka"	Marko Tomasović, Mario Vukelić	Open submission
Ivana Banfić	"Mir"	Ante Pecotić	Invited by HRT
Ivana Radovniković	"Kakav tužan kraj"	Ivana Radovniković, Stjepan Marković	Open submission
Ivo Gamulin Gianni	"Sanjam"	Andrej Baša, Fayo	Open submission
Kraljevi ulice and 75 Cents	"Romanca"	Miran Hadži Veljković	Open submission
Maja Blagdan	"Zvala sam ga anđele"	Miro Buljan, Nenad Ninčević	Invited by HRT
Maja Šuput	"Lako zaljubljiva"	Denis Dumančić, Fayo	Open submission
Martina	"Idi ledja mi okreni"	Marino Mahić, Darus Despot	Open submission
Mor Roll	"Ne razumijemo se"	Vedran Šilipetar	Open submission
Pero Galić	"Otvori mi oči"	Denis Dumančić, Fayo	Invited by HRT
Prva Liga and Druge	"Vila"	Miroslav Škoro, Željko Barba	Invited by HRT
Tamara Obrovac	"Amor"	Tamara Obrovac, Anja Gasparini	Invited by HRT
Vlatka Grakalić	"Kaži mi"	Fedor Boić	Open submission
Zorica Kondža	"Za tobom luda"	Joško Banov, Nenad Ninčević	Open submission

==== Semi-final ====
The semi-final took place on 22 February 2008, hosted by Duško Ćurlić, Nikolina Pišek, and Lana Jurčević. The six qualifiers for the final were determined exclusively by a public televote. In addition to the performances of the competing entries, Tony Hadley performed as the interval act during the show.

Semi-final – 22 February 2008
R/O	Artist	Song	Televote	Place
1	Bonaca and Nera	"Tvoje oko ka' more duboko"	1,253	6
2	Antonija Šola	"Gdje je srce tu je dom"	1,531	4
3	Ivo Gamulin Gianni	"Sanjam"	1,533	3
4	Ibrica Jusić	"Iskoči sa mnom iz jurećeg vlaka"	103	14
5	Martina	"Idi leđa mi okreni"	657	10
6	Zorica Kondža	"Za tobom luda"	382	11
7	Vlatka Grakalić	"Kaži mi"	680	9
8	Ivana Radovniković	"Kakav tužan kraj"	322	13
9	Mor Roll	"Ne razumijemo se"	325	12
10	Danijela Pintarić	"Dotakni zvijezdu"	957	8
11	Ðani Stipanicev	"Ja san umra za ljubav"	1,058	7
12	Kraljevi ulice and 75 Cents	"Romanca"	3,770	1
13	Maja Šuput	"Lako zaljubljiva"	1,613	2
14	Emilija Kokić	"Anđeo"	1,439	5

==== Final ====
The final took place on 23 February 2008, hosted by Duško Ćurlić, Mirko Fodor, Nikolina Pišek, and Lana Jurčević. The six entries that qualified from the semi-final alongside the ten pre-qualified entries competed and the winner, "Romanca" performed by Kraljevi ulice and 75 Cents, was determined by a 50/50 combination of votes from a five-member jury panel and a public televote. "Milina" performed by Dino Dvornik and Bane was disqualified from the final after the artists did not attend rehearsals and therefore their votes weren't counted. Antonija Šola and Kraljevi ulice and 75 Cents were tied at 31 points each but since Kraljevi ulice and 75 Cents received the most points from the jury they were declared the winner. The jury that voted in the final consisted of Silvije Glojnarić (HRT), Robert Urlić (HR), Branko Uvodić (HTV), Željen Klašterka (HTV) and Aleksandar Kostadinov (HTV).

In addition to the performances of the competing entries, the show was opened by Dragonfly featuring Dado Topić, who represented Croatia in 2007, while Irish Johnny Logan, who won Eurovision for Ireland in 1980 and in 1987, performed as the interval act.

Final – 23 February 2008
R/O	Artist	Song	Jury	Televote		Total	Place
R/O	Artist	Song	Jury	Votes	Points	Total	Place
1	Dye and the Colors	"Zažmirim i putujem"	4	496	8	12	12
2	Hari Rončević	"Ležim na suncu"	2	229	4	6	15
3	Emilija Kokić	"Anđeo"	8	1,554	12	20	7
4	Prva Liga and Druge	"Vila"	6	2,571	14	20	8
5	Tamara Obrovac	"Amor"	14	279	6	20	6
6	Pero Galić	"Otvori mi oči"	6	690	9	15	10
7	Antonija Šola	"Gdje je srce tu je dom"	15	4,119	16	31	2
8	Ivo Gamulin Gianni	"Sanjam"	12	1,858	13	25	3
9	Alen Islamović	"Mirno spava kosa plava"	8	193	3	11	13
10	Maja Blagdan	"Zvala sam ga anđele"	4	247	5	9	14
11	Giuliano	"Plava vještica"	12	117	2	14	11
12	Maja Šuput	"Lako zaljubljiva"	12	835	10	22	5
13	Kraljevi ulice and 75 Cents	"Romanca"	16	3,882	15	31	1
14	Bonaca and Nera	"Tvoje oko ka' more duboko"	13	1,246	11	24	4
15	Ivana Banfić	"Mir"	9	358	7	16	9
16	Dino Dvornik and Bane	"Milina"	1	0	1	2	16

Detailed Jury Votes
R/O	Song	Juror					Total	Points
R/O	Song	1	2	3	4	5	Total	Points
1	"Zažmirim i putujem"	7	7	7	7	8	36	4
2	"Ležim na suncu"	6	6	7	6	7	32	2
3	"Anđeo"	8	8	7	8	7	38	8
4	"Vila"	7	8	7	7	8	37	6
5	"Amor"	8	8	9	10	9	44	14
6	"Otvori mi oči"	7	9	7	7	7	37	6
7	"Gdje je srce tu je dom"	9	9	9	9	9	45	15
8	"Sanjam"	9	8	8	9	8	42	12
9	"Mirno spava kosa plava"	7	8	8	8	7	38	8
10	"Zvala sam ga anđele"	8	7	7	7	7	36	4
11	"Plava vještica"	9	8	8	8	9	42	12
12	"Lako zaljubljiva"	8	9	8	9	8	42	12
13	"Romanca"	10	10	10	10	10	50	16
14	"Tvoje oko ka' more duboko"	9	10	8	8	8	43	13
15	"Mir"	8	8	8	9	8	41	9
16	"Milina"	0	0	0	0	0	0	1

=== Preparation ===
In early March, Kraljevi ulice and 75 Cents filmed the music video for "Romanca", which was directed by Tihomir Žarn. The music video was presented on 18 March during the HRT 1 programme Na domaćem terenu. A Russian language version of the song was also recorded entitled "Romantsa".

=== Promotion ===
Kraljevi ulice and 75 Cents made several appearances across Europe to specifically promote "Romanca" as the Croatian Eurovision entry. On 2 March, Kraljevi ulice and 75 Cents performed during the presentation show of the 2008 Bosnian Eurovision entry, BH Eurosong Show 2008. On 9 March, the artists performed during the semi-final of the Serbian Eurovision national final Beovizija 2008.

== At Eurovision ==
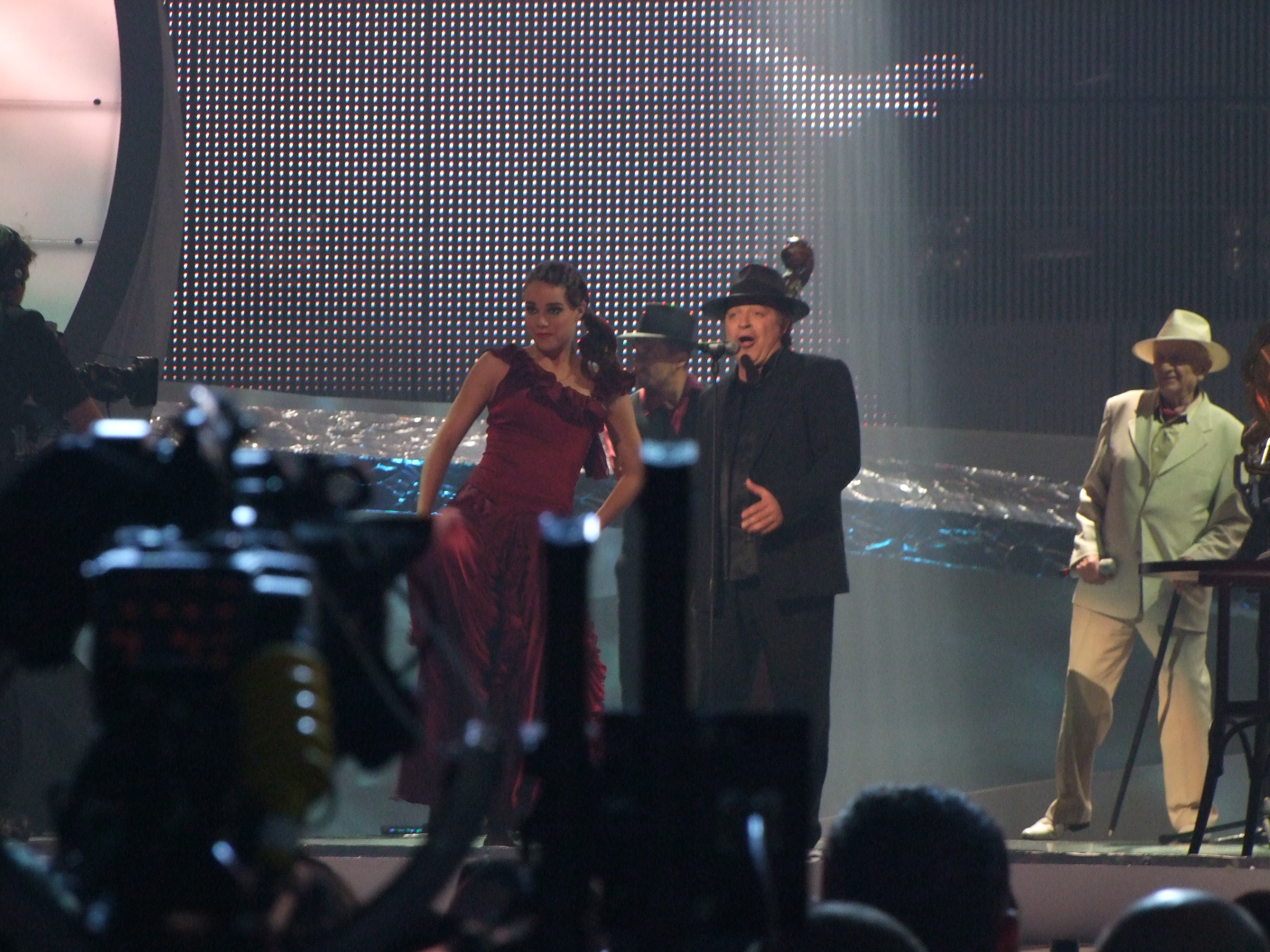
Kraljevi ulice and 75 Cents performing at the Eurovision Song Contest

It was announced in September 2007 that the competition's format would be expanded to two semi-finals in 2008. According to Eurovision rules, all nations with the exceptions of the host country and the "Big Four" (France, Germany, Spain, and the United Kingdom) are required to qualify from one of two semi-finals in order to compete for the final; the top nine songs from each semi-final as determined by televoting progress to the final, and a tenth was determined by back-up juries. The European Broadcasting Union (EBU) split up the competing countries into six different pots based on voting patterns from previous contests, with countries with favourable voting histories put into the same pot. On 28 January 2008, a special allocation draw was held which placed each country into one of the two semi-finals. Croatia was placed into the second semi-final, to be held on 22 May 2008. The running order for the semi-finals was decided through another draw on 17 March 2008 and Croatia was set to perform in position 11, following the entry from Latvia and before the entry from Bulgaria.

The two semi-finals were broadcast in Croatia on HRT 2, while the final was broadcast on HRT 1. All shows featured commentary by Duško Ćurlić. HRT appointed Barbara Kolar as its spokesperson to announce the Croatian votes during the final.

=== Semi-final ===
Kraljevi ulice and 75 Cents took part in technical rehearsals on 14 and 18 May, followed by dress rehearsals on 21 and 22 May. The Croatian performance featured the members of Kraljevi ulice all dressed in dark and 75 Cents dressed in a white suit and wearing a white hat. The performers' outfits were designed by Jadranka Tomić. 75 Cents began the performance on a chair before standing up to walk around the stage with a walking stick and finishing the song by scratching a record on a gramophone. Kraljevi ulice and 75 Cents were joined on stage by a ballet dancer, Mia Lisak, who stood on a pedestal in a red dress and played chimes consisting of water-filled bottles towards the end.

At the end of the show, Croatia was announced as having finished in the top 10 and subsequently qualifying for the grand final. It was later revealed that Croatia placed fourth in the semi-final, receiving a total of 112 points.

=== Final ===
Shortly after the second semi-final, a winners' press conference was held for the ten qualifying countries. As part of this press conference, the qualifying artists took part in a draw to determine the running order of the final. This draw was done in the order the countries appeared in the semi-final running order. Croatia was drawn to perform in position 9, following the entry from Finland and before the entry from Poland.

Kraljevi ulice and 75 Cents once again took part in dress rehearsals on 23 and 24 May before the final. Kraljevi ulice and 75 Cents performed a repeat of their semi-final performance during the final on 24 May. At the conclusion of the voting, Croatia finished in twenty-first place with 44 points.

=== Voting ===
Below is a breakdown of points awarded to Croatia and awarded by Croatia in the second semi-final and grand final of the contest. The nation awarded its 12 points to Macedonia in the semi-final and to Bosnia and Herzegovina in the final of the contest.

==== Points awarded to Croatia ====
Points awarded to Croatia (Semi-final 2)
Score	Country
12 points	
10 points	Hungary; Macedonia; Serbia
8 points	Georgia
7 points	Belarus; Latvia; Ukraine
6 points	Bulgaria; Cyprus; Portugal; Switzerland
5 points	Lithuania; Turkey
4 points	Iceland; Sweden
3 points	Albania; Czech Republic; Denmark
2 points	France
1 point	

Points awarded to Croatia (Final)
Score	Country
12 points	
10 points	Bosnia and Herzegovina
8 points	Slovenia
7 points	
6 points	
5 points	Latvia
4 points	
3 points	Portugal; Serbia; Switzerland
2 points	Armenia; Germany; Macedonia; Montenegro
1 point	Georgia; Romania; Russia; Ukraine

==== Points awarded by Croatia ====
Points awarded by Croatia (Semi-final 2)
Score	Country
12 points	Macedonia
10 points	Albania
8 points	Portugal
7 points	Ukraine
6 points	Latvia
5 points	Switzerland
4 points	Malta
3 points	Denmark
2 points	Czech Republic
1 point	Bulgaria

Points awarded by Croatia (Final)
Score	Country
12 points	Bosnia and Herzegovina
10 points	Serbia
8 points	Albania
7 points	Ukraine
6 points	Russia
5 points	Greece
4 points	Latvia
3 points	Portugal
2 points	Israel
1 point	Norway
