= Kraljevi ulice =

Croatian band

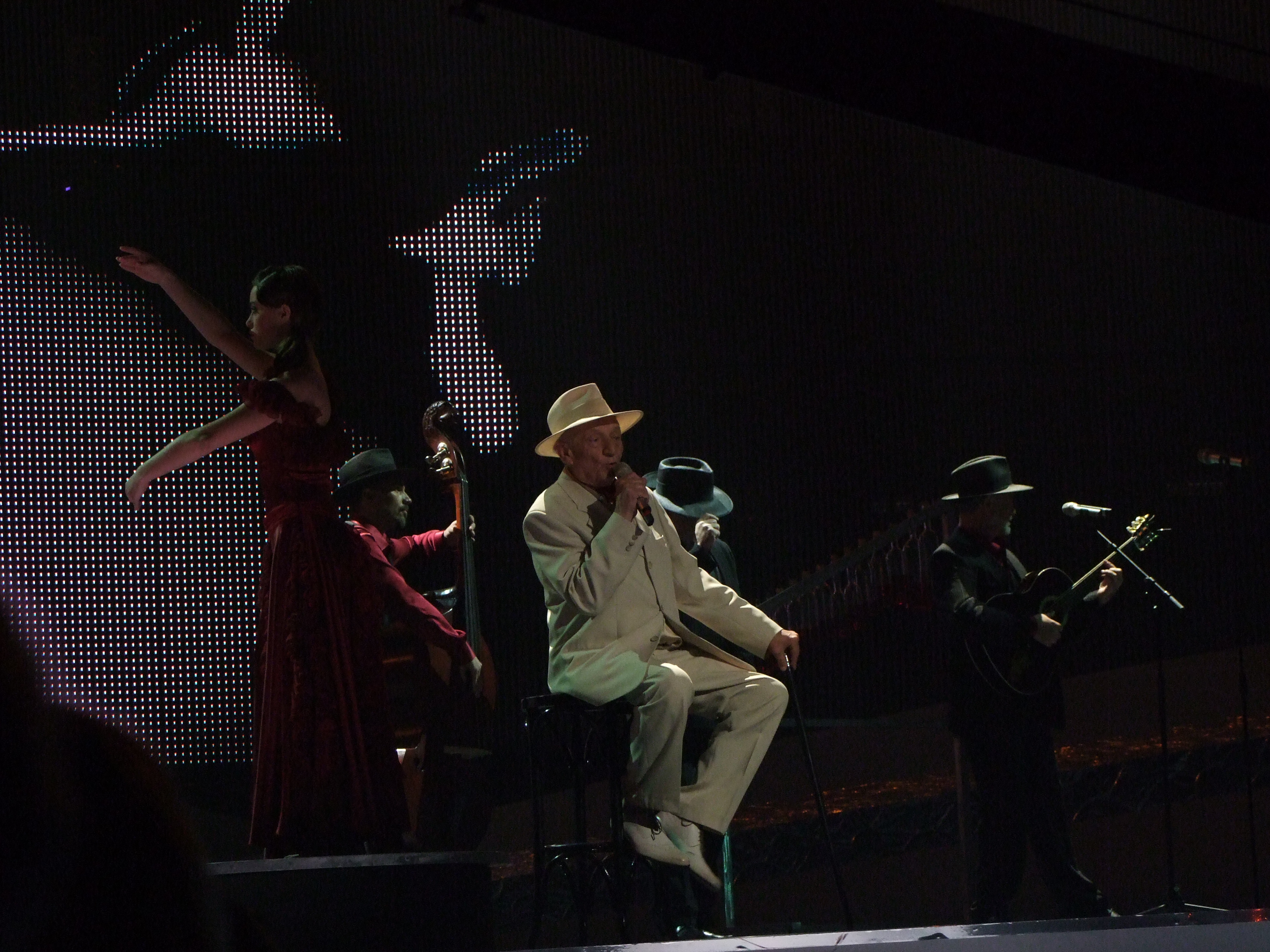
Kraljevi ulice in the Eurovision Song Contest 2008

Kraljevi ulice is a Croatian band founded by Miran Hadži Veljković and Zlatko Petrović Pajo. The band's name translates as "Kings of the Street". They were established in 1987 and subsequently developed public acknowledgement for their open air performances on Zagreb squares. They were chosen to represent Croatia at the Eurovision Song Contest 2008 in Belgrade, Serbia. They sang "Romanca" alongside 75 Cents, and came in 21st.

75 Cents was the stage name of Croatian singer Ladislav Demeterffy a.k.a. Laci (29 January 1933 – 19 November 2010) who performed with Kraljevi ulice in the Eurovision Song Contest 2008. He was dubbed "75 Cents", a reference to his age at the time (75). As of 2010, he was the oldest known participant in the history of the contest, but had this record beaten in May 2012, when Natalya Pugacheva (late October 1935 – 2019) represented Russia as part of the group Buranovskiye Babushki. Later, Emil Ramsauer (1918 - 2021) of the band Takasa who represented Switzerland in the Eurovision Song Contest 2013 broke the record. Demeterffy later died at Vinogradska Hospital in Zagreb on 19 November 2010, aged 77.

Preceded by Dragonfly & Dado Topić with "Vjerujem u ljubav"	Croatia in the Eurovision Song Contest; 2008 (with 75 Cents)	Succeeded by Igor Cukrov & Andrea with "Lijepa Tena"
