= Dragonfly (band) =

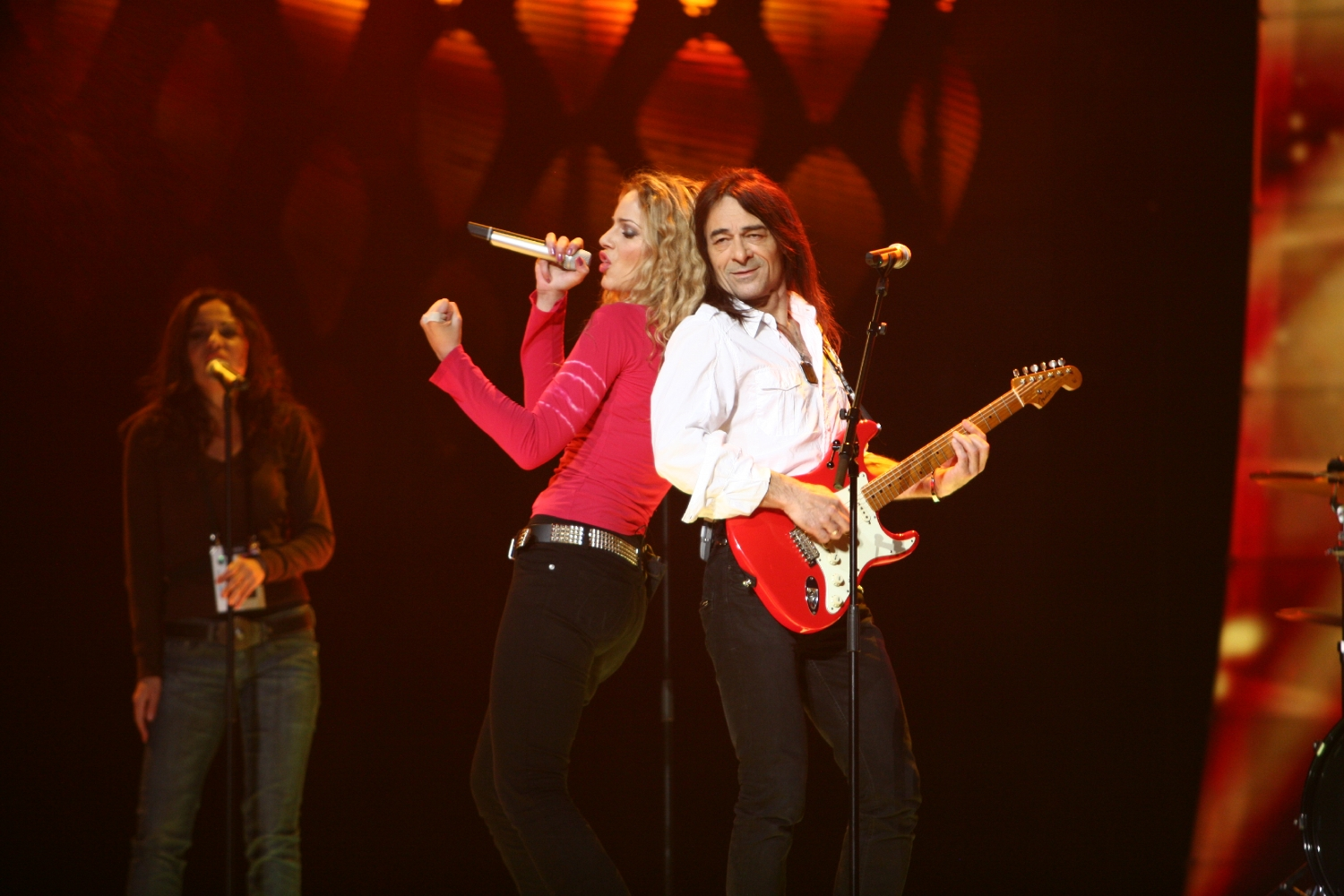
- Dragonfly & Dado Topic perform at Eurovision Song Contest 2007

Background information
- Origin: Croatia
- Years active: 1997–present

Dragonfly is the group which represented Croatia in the Eurovision Song Contest 2007 in Helsinki, Finland. Its members are Drago Vidakovic, Branko Kuznar, Branko Badanjak, and Iva Gluhak.

== Songs in Croatian ==
- "Reci mi da znam"
- "Gledam u sunce"
- "Dođi mi pod bor"
- "Vjerujem u ljubav" (2007 ESC entry)

Preceded by Severina with Moja štikla	Croatia in the Eurovision Song Contest (with Dado Topić); 2007	Succeeded by Kraljevi ulice feat. 75 cents with Romanca
