= Emilija Kokić =

Croatian singer (born 1968)

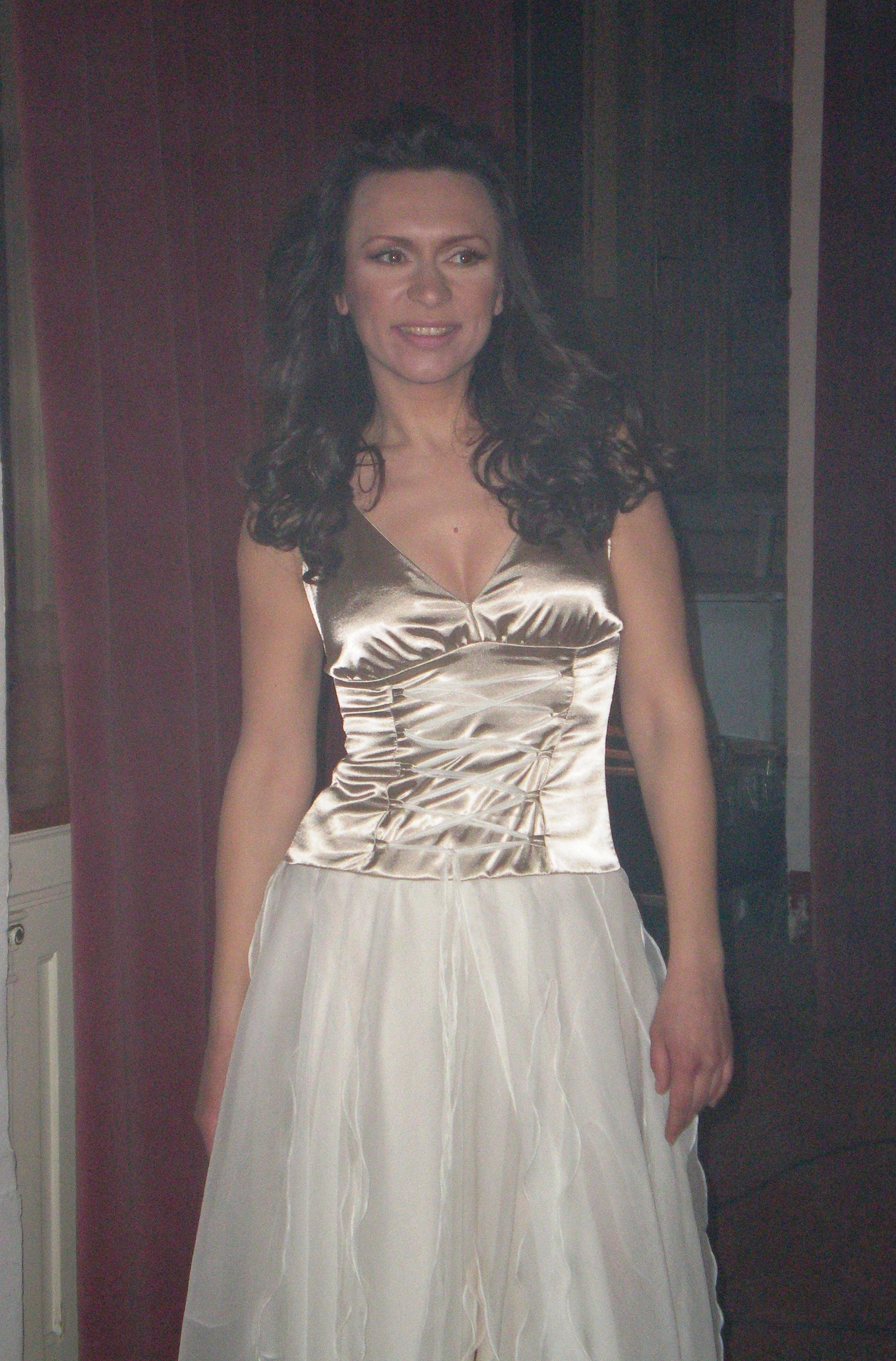
- Emilija Kokić at Dora 2008

Background information
- Born: Emilija Kokić; 10 May 1968 (age 58); Zadar, SR Croatia, SFR Yugoslavia (modern Croatia)
- Genres: Pop, Rock
- Occupations: Singer, composer, musician
- Years active: 1980's–present
- Labels: Minacord, Hayat Production
- Website: Emilija Kokić Official Website

Emilija Kokić (born 10 May 1968) is a Croatian singer. She was the lead singer of the Croatian pop band Riva, which won the Eurovision Song Contest 1989 for Yugoslavia, with the song Rock Me, just four days before her 21st birthday. Currently Emilija is a solo artist and singing teacher in Croatia. She tried her luck at the national Dora festival, whose winner was to represent Croatia at Eurovision. She came 2nd at Dora 2001 and joint 6th at Dora 2008.

At Dora 2011 she was part of the jury and also performed Rock Me.

== Biography ==
Emilija Kokić was born on 10 May 1968 in Zadar to Vice and Marija Kokić. She has a brother, Nenad.

== Discography ==
- Emilia (1994)
- 100 % Emilia (1995)
- Ostavi trag (1996)
- S moje strane svemira (1999)
- Ja sam tu (2001)
- Halo (2004)
- Čime sam te zaslužila (2008)

=== Singles ===
Year	Single								
Year	Single	CRO	BH	MNE	KOS	MAC	SER	SLO	VOJ
1988	"Šangaj"	1	14	10	1	6	22	1	1
1989	"Rock Me" (Eurovision entry)	1	1	1	1	1	1	1	1
1989	"Sretan ti put"	4	8	11	1	14	22	1	1
1990	"Gdje si bio i s kim"	1	1	1	1	17	—	4	1
1990	"Srce laneta"	4	6	1	1	5	—	9	1
1990	"Meni mama ne da da"	11	9	—	1	—	—	4	1
1994	"Javi se"	1	1	—	—	8	—	1	—
1994	"Što mi značiš ti"	1	1	1	—	1	—	1	—
1994	"S nama je gotovo"	10	11	20	—	25	—	8	—
1995	"100% znam"	4	8	11	—	39	—	3	—
1995	"Ja sam bila s njim"	3	2	5	—	8	—	1	—
1995	"Ti si najbolje"	9	3	3	—	8	—	3	—
1996	"Bože kako sam pogriješila"	3	2	4	1	8	—	2	—
1996	"Ja sam vlak" with Nina Badrić	1	1	4	5	3	—	1	—
1999	"Gdje da krenem"	7	8	1	1	11	20	1	17
1999	"Kad izgubi se ljubav'	2	7	4	8	12	9	3	4
2000	"Volim te, tako htio je bog"	4	4	4	1	9	12	2	4
2000	"Zaboravi na mene"	4	6	10	2	14	37	2	18
2000	"Tu sam ti ja"	7	6	4	10	42	4	13	4
2001	"Ljepota" with Juci (Dora entry)	1	1	1	1	1	1	1	1
2001	"Nisam ni okom trepnula"	2	1	4	1	6	22	1	1
2001	"Nije vrime"	—	—	—	—	—	—	—	—
2002	"Santa ledena"	10	19	10	8	12	—	—	—
2003	"Žena od pepela"(Dora entry)	14	11	—	—	—	—	—	—
2004	"Moja ljubavi"	9	—	—	—	—	—	—	—
2004	"Jesmo li jedno drugom suđeni" with Boris Režak	—	2	2	3	—	—	2	—
2008	"Anđeo"(Dora entry)	1	1	1	1	1	1	1	1
2008	"Čime sam te zaslužila"	32	—	—	—	—	—	—	—
2008	"I'll never fall in love again"	5	3	8	4	6	9	2	2

== Personal life ==
She is married to Miljenko Kokot. They have no children.

Awards and achievements
Preceded by (Switzerland) Céline Dion with "Ne partez pas sans moi"	Winner of the Eurovision Song Contest; 1989 (as part of Riva)	Succeeded by (Italy) Toto Cutugno with "Insieme: 1992"
Preceded by Srebrna Krila with "Mangup"	Yugoslavia in the Eurovision Song Contest; 1989 (as part of Riva)	Succeeded by Tajči with "Hajde da ludujemo"
