= Neko nas posmatra =

Studio album by Ekatarina Velika
- Released: May 1993
- Recorded: 1993, PGP RTB Studios, Belgrade
- Genre: Alternative rock
- Label: PGP RTS
- Producer: Milan Mladenović

Ekatarina Velika chronology
Dum Dum (1991)	Neko nas posmatra (1993)	Live 88 (1997)

Professional ratings
Review scores
Source	Rating
Ritam	2/5 stars

Neko nas posmatra (English: Somebody Is Watching Us) is the seventh and final studio album by Serbian and Yugoslav rock band Ekatarina Velika, released in 1993. Contrary to the previous record, it contained more positive and optimistic views. It is the only album that included a cover song, "Istina Mašina" (Truth Machine) by the band Time, the gesture that was a tribute to a Yugoslav musician Dado Topić. The album was produced by Milan Mladenović himself. The guest stars were Srđan "Žika" Todorović and Tanja Jovićević (backing vocals).

== Track listing ==
All lyrics are written by Milan Mladenović except where noted; all music is composed by Milan Mladenović except where noted, arrangements by Ekatarina Velika

No.	Title	Lyrics	Music	Length
1.	"Neko nas posmatra (Somebody Is Watching Us)"		Margita Stefanović, Milan Mladenović	4:47
2.	"Istina mašina (Truth Machine)" (cover of Time's song)	Dado Topić	Dado Topić	4:21
3.	"Ne (No)"			3:46
4.	"Zajedno (Together)"			3:50
5.	"Anestezija (Anesthesia)"			3:45
6.	"Just let me play some modern R'N'R music"			3:17
7.	"Hej mama (Hey, Mother)"			4:15
8.	"Bežimo u mrak (Let's Run Into The Dark)"		M. Stefanović, M. Mladenović	3:23
9.	"Jadransko more (Adriatic Sea)"			4:10
10.	"Ponos (Pride)"			4:27

== Personnel ==
- Milan Mladenović - vocals, guitar
- Margita Stefanović - piano, keyboards
- Dragiša "Ćima" Uskoković - bass
- Marko Milivojević - drums

== Charts ==
Weekly chart performance for Neko nas posmatra
Chart (2024)	Peak position
Croatian International Albums (HDU)	5
