= Live 88 (Ekatarina Velika album) =

Live album by Ekatarina Velika
- Released: February 1997
- Recorded: 1988, SNP Novi Sad and "Kulušić" club, Zagreb
- Genre: Rock
- Label: Global Music

Ekatarina Velika chronology
Neko nas posmatra (1993)	Live 88 (1997)	Kao u snu - EKV Live 1991 (2001)

Live 88 is a second live album from the Serbian rock band Ekatarina Velika. It was released in 1997 by the band's ex drummer, Ivan "Firchie" Fece. The album contains recording of the concert held in 1988 in SNP, Novi Sad, together with two songs from the concert in Zagreb "Kulušić" club from the same year.

== Track listing ==
(music by Ekatarina Velika except where noted, arrangements by Ekatarina Velika, lyrics by Milan Mladenović except where noted)

1. "Modro i zeleno"
2. "To sam ja" (lyrics: EKV)
3. "7 dana" (lyrics: M. Stefanović)
4. "Tonemo"
5. "Voda"
6. "Oči boje meda"
7. "Budi sam na ulici"
8. "Ljudi iz gradova"
9. "Pored mene"
10. "Tattoo"
11. "Ti si sav moj bol"
12. "Ljubav"
13. "Soba" (#)
14. "Jesen" (music: Katarina II) (#)

(#) Live from "Kulušić" club, Zagreb, 1988

== Personnel ==
- Milan Mladenović - vocals, guitar
- Margita Stefanović - piano, keyboards, vocals
- Bojan Pečar - bass
- Ivan "Firchie" Fece - drums

=== Additional personnel ===
- Theodore Yanni - guitar (3)
