= Kao u snu – EKV Live 1991 =

Kao u snu - EKV Live '91

Live album by Ekatarina Velika
- Released: 2001
- Recorded: December 13, 1991, Dom omladine, Belgrade
- Genre: Rock
- Label: EKV Records

Ekatarina Velika chronology
Live 88 (1997)	Kao u snu - EKV Live '91 (2001)

Kao u snu – EKV Live 1991 is the third live album by Serbian rock band Ekatarina Velika, released in 2001. It was recorded at the band's concert held on December 13, 1991, in Dom omladine" in Belgrade, which was a part of the Dum Dum album promotional tour.

== Track listing ==
(music by Ekatarina Velika, except: 1,2,4,5,6,7,11,12 - by Milan Mladenović, arrangements by Ekatarina Velika, lyrics by Milan Mladenović except where noted)

1. "Odgovor" - 5:05
2. "Siguran" - 5:49
3. "Kao da je bilo nekad" - 5:23
4. "Karavan" - 3:54
5. "Dolce vita" - 4:22
6. "Idemo" - 4:03
7. "Glad" - 3:51
8. "Oči boje meda" - 4:32
9. "Zemlja" (lyrics: M. Mladenović, M. Stefanović) - 4:26
10. "Krug" - 3:16
11. "Zabranjujem" - 6:08
12. "Bledo" - 5:10
13. "Budi sam na ulici" - 5:18
14. "Ti si sav moj bol" - 5:51
15. "Ljudi iz gradova" - 5:37
16. "Novac u rukama" - 4:04

== Personnel ==
- Milan Mladenović - vocals, guitar
- Margita Stefanović - keyboards
- Marko Milivojević - drums
- Dragiša "Ćima" Uskoković - bass
- Tanja Jovićević - backing vocals

=== Additional personnel ===
- Srđan "Žika" Todorović - drums (10)
- Neša Petrović - saxophone (2,3)
- Goran "Čavke" Čavajda - rgyagling (12)
