= Janez Bončina =

Janez Bončina – Benč
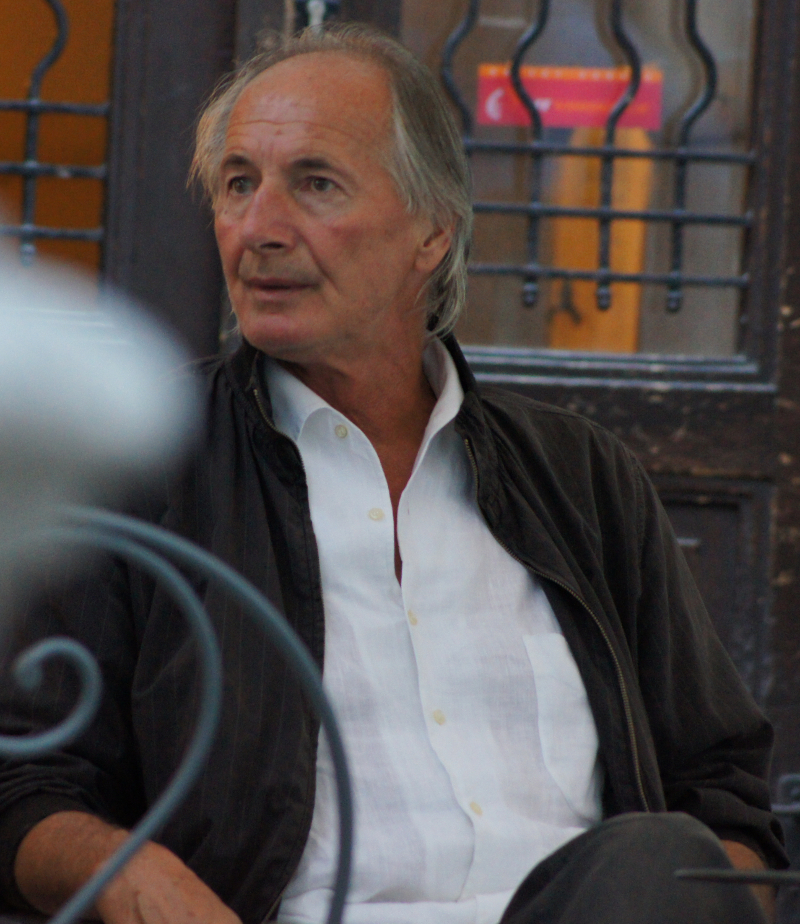
- Benč in July 2012.

Background information
- Born: Janez Bončina; 3 December 1948 (age 77); Ljubljana, PR Slovenia, FPR Yugoslavia
- Genres: Pop, rock, jazz rock
- Occupations: Singer, musician, producer, songwriter
- Instruments: Vocals, guitar, piano
- Years active: 1965-today

Janez Bončina, nicknamed Benč (born 3 December 1947) is a Slovenian composer, guitarist and singer. He is one of the leading authors and performers of Slovenian and Yugoslavian rock music. In the middle of the 1960s, Bončina with his friend Tomaž Domicelj from the group Helioni, showed his talent for music. Later with the group "Mladi Levi" he created projects which started the Slovenian pop rock scene.

== Biography ==
In 1970–1972, he collaborated with the international group The Generals, and in 1972 he founded the rock group Srce. With selected Yugoslavian musicians, he founded the group September in 1975. Their music consisted of jazz rock, and was recognised domestically and internationally. September used to be the ambassador of Yugoslavian rock abroad; in the years 1976–1979 they were guests in the Soviet Union, Belgium, Italy, Cuba, Germany, France and finally United States, where they recorded their second album.

In 1983 Benč returned to music scene with the solo album Ob Šanku, which was created with the arranger Gregor Forjanič. With the group Karamela he was a guest in Italy, Germany and the Soviet Union, recordings from the tour were, later published on a live album. At this time, Pepsi Cola chose him as a Yugoslavian representative of international propaganda action, where he played along with Tina Turner in a propaganda video.

In 1988, he created a group called Yunk – Junaki nočne kronike, which with direct and critical lyrics and acclaimed performances got recognised by larger audience. After 2 successful albums he left the group.

The year 1992 was the beginning of his acoustical period and musical collaboration with Tomo Jurak and Janez Zmazek – Žan. In a short period, they had numerous concerts and received several prizes. In 1994 Benč collaborated in the group of a magnificent 7, together with Janez Zmazek, Vlado Kreslin, Zoran Predin, Peter Lovšin, Aleksander Mežek, Tomaž Domicelj and Jani Kovačič. The acoustic period ended with golden note for best Slovenian rock singer in the year 1995.

In 1996 and 1997, Benč returned to his musical roots and collaborated with great instrumentalists, such as Marijan Maliković, Primož Grašič, Jadran Ogrin, Jani Hace, Blaž Jurjevčič, Ratko Divjak, Tulio Furlanič and others, with whom they had concerts in Yugoslavia and abroad.

In 1998 and 1999, he collaborated with Big Band RTV Slovenia as author and performer with their projects. After the release of the album Bendologija in 1999, which was awarded the Golden rooster prize, Benč and friends (including Grašič, Divjak, Rahimovski, Maliković, Ogrin) went on a concert tour, where they performed at Lent, Lignano Sabbiadoro, Pula at a bikers' festival, as well as in Ljubljana, as well as in Sarajevo at the event Live for Life, and at the new year 2000 celebration at the Zagreb club Tvornica, where they played along with Josipa Lisac, Dado Topić, Dino Dvornik and Nina Badrič.

In 2003, a new album The Best of September was released. For this purpose, Benč reunited the group again, along with Doblekar, Asanović, Ogrin, Maliković, Divjak and Tulio Furlanič. Concerts in Pula, Portorose and Lent reached their top in Ljubljana's Hala Tivoli together with the legendary group Deep Purple.

In 2005, Benč and arranger Braco J. Doblekar reunited together in author project Janezz together with young musicians, students of musical universities from home and abroad (Berklee, Linz, Graz, Rotterdam, Ljubljana, Klagenfurt) reunited for this occasion in the Big band maintained by Braco J. Doblekar.

== Others talents ==
Benč is not only famous as a musician, but also as a painter and sportsman, and occasional actor. In the season of 1976–1977 he performed in J. Arden's show "Živite kot svinje", directed by Zvone Šedlbauer at the theatre in Ljubljana. He later starred in a movie Eva, directed by Franci Slak. He also wrote the music for some other movies and television projects.

== Prizes ==
- 1969 – MLADI LEVI: ZAZNAMOVAN, Slovenska popevka, prize of the jury
- 1970 – MLADI LEVI: OLUJA, Opatija, prize of the jury
- 1971 – MLADI LEVI: GOSTJA, Slovenska popevka, prize for best performance
- 1974 – SRCE: SPOMIN, Slovenska popevka 1974, best performance and best debut
- 1983 – Janez Bončina: OB ŠANKU, Pop delavnica 1983, prize of the jury and the audience
- 1984 – Janez Bončina: NAVALI NAROD NA GOSTILNE, Pop workshop, 1. prize of the audience
- 1985 – Yugoslavian achievement for work
- 1992 – Janez Bončina: KADAR OGNJI DOGORIJO, Pop workshop, prize of the jury
- 1992 – BENČ & TOMO: NOSILA JE RDEČO ROŽO, MMS, prize of international jury
- 1987 – BENČ: POET, Pop delavnica, 2. prize of the audience
- 1993 – Golden note for lifetime achievements
- 1994 – BENČ: ABRAHAM, MMS, prize for lyrics and performance
- 1995 – Golden note for best rock singer of year 1994
- 1996 – BENČ: JOŽA IZ PORTOROŽA, MMS, prize of the jury for performance
- 1997 – Nomination for Golden rooster in the category for Rock singer
- 1997 – ČAS ZACELI RANE (A. Godec), MMS, prize of international jury for authoring
- 1999 – BENČ: BENDOLOGIJA, Golden rooster for best compilation

== Discography ==
- MLADI LEVI (1969, MC Cassette)
- MLADI LEVI: ZAZNAMOVAN (1969), LJUBEZEN (1970), GOSTJA (1971) (Slovenska popevka 1969, 1970, 1971)
- BENČ, BOR & DEJVI: VŠEČ MI JE ... (1971)
- Janez Bončina: & DITKA HABERL: MAŠKARADA, music from the movie (1971)
- MLADI LEVI: BLESNA KAKO NOŽ (1972)
- SRCE: GVENDOLINA, KDO JE BIL? (1972)
- BENČ & ASANOVIČ: MAJKO ZEMLJO (1974)
- BENČ: MAJA Z BISERI, ČLOVEK (Slovenska popevka 1975)
- SEPTEMBER: LUDUJ S NAMA (1975)
- SEPTEMBER: ZADNJA AVANTURA (1976)
- SEPTEMBER: LIVE IN STUDIO M (1977)
- SEPTEMBER: DOMOVINA MOJA (1978)
- Janez Bončina – BENČ: OB ŠANKU (1983)
- LEGENDE YU ROCKA (1987)
- BENČ & JUNAKI NOČNE KRONIKE: NA NOGE (1988)
- BENČ & JUNAKI NOČNE KRONIKE: GRAFFITI (1989)
- Janez Bončina – BENČ: NAJLEPŠI NEUSPEHI (1992)
- Janez Bončina – BENČ: STARO VINO (1996)
- Janez Bončina – BENČ: BENDOLOGIJA (1999)
- MLADI LEVI: ANTOLOGIJA (1999)
- BENČ: DELO MI NE LEŽI (released 28. maja 2001)
- BENČ: JANEZZ (2005)
