= Faraoni (band) =

Yugoslavian music group

- Origin: Izola, Slovenia
- Genres: Beat music; pop rock; rhythm and blues; progressive rock; pop
- Years active: 1967-1972; 1986–2007
- Labels: Jugoton, ZKP RTLJ, D-Look, ZKP RTVS, POP Records, Nika Records, Dallas Records
- Past members: Stojan Družina; Janez Kolarič; Valter Soša; Nelfi Depanger; Črtomir Janovski; Marjan Malikovič; Tulio Furlanič; Georgij Krestanov; Piero Pocecco; Ferdinand Maraš; Slavko Ivančić; Ezro Horvatin; Robert Buljevič; Klaudio Krmac; Karlo Jaksetič

Faraoni (trans. The Pharaohs) were a Slovenian and Yugoslav rock and pop band formed in Izola in 1967. Although they were not among the earliest Yugoslav rock bands, Faraoni, as other Yugoslav rock groups of the 1960s, played a pioneering role on the Yugoslav rock scene.

Faraoni started their career performing covers of foreign beat and pop rock hits, before moving towards rhythm and blues. In the 1970s the band moved towards progressive rock, disbanding in 1972. In 1979, original Faraoni drummer Nelfi Depanger reformed the band. The reformed Faraoni performed as a backing band for a number of pop singers, most notably Oliver Dragojević, and released the band's first studio album in 1988. Since the beginning of the 1990s, the band turned towards pop sound, releasing seven more studio albums. They officially ended their activity in 2007, reuniting occasionally for anniversary performances and concerts in larger venues.

== History ==
=== 1967–1972 ===
Faraoni were formed at the end of 1967 in Izola by Stojan Družina (guitar), Janez Kolarič, alias Đani Kolori (rhythm guitar), Valter Soša (bass guitar) and Nelfi Depanger (drums), Soša soon being replaced by Črtomir "Črt" Janovski. During the first year of their activity, organist Tine Guzelj occasionally performed with them. At the beginning of their career, Faraoni performed covers of foreign beat and pop rock hits, and later moved towards rhythm and blues, managing to gain local popularity. They gained further attention of the public with their appearances on the Belgrade Guitar Festival and Ljubljana Guitar Festival.

In the summer of 1968, Kolarič was replaced by Marjan Malikovič, formerly of the band Kameleoni. Soon after, they were joined by another former Kameleoni drummer, Tulio Furlančič, so for a period of time they performed with two drummers. Depanger left the band at the beginning of 1970, Faraoni continuing with Furlančič on drums, moving towards progressive rock. In the summer of 1970, they released the EP Berač (Picker) through Jugoton and performed for a month in the club Simonida in Belgrade. At the end of the year, Družina left the band. Faraoni continued their career by appearing in a documentary film about the group, directed by Koni Steinbacher. At the beginning of 1971, they were joined by Bulgarian organist Georgij Krestanov. However, after failing to gain larger attention of the public, Faraoni disbanded at the beginning of 1972, the members of the group continuing their career in other bands.

=== 1979–2007 ===
In 1979, Faraoni reunited in the lineup consisting of Marjan Malikovič (guitar), Nelfi Depanger (drums), Piero Pocecco (formerly of I Simplici, bass guitar and vocals), and Ferdinand "Ferdi" Maraš (keyboards), holding a comeback concert on 29 November, celebrated as the Rebulic Day in SFR Yugoslavia. They continued their career as a backing band for a number of pop singers. In 1981, they were joined by a new member, keyboardist and vocalist Slavko Ivančić. During the same year, they held a concert with Kameleoni in Portorož. At the beginning of 1983, Malikovič and Ivančić left the band, and the group was joined by guitarist Ezro Horvatin. The new lineup performed as a backing band for Oliver Dragojević, Tereza Kesovija, Kićo Slabinac and Mišo Kovač. The group backed Oliver Dragojević on his tour across the United States and Canada. At the beginning of 1986, they performed in clubs in Western Europe.

In 1988, the band released their first studio release since their 1970 EP Berač, their first studio album entitled simply Faraoni. They performed as the backing band for Oliver Dragojević on his 1989 concert in Croatian National Theatre (HNK), the recording of which was released on the double live album Oliver u HNK (Oliver in HNK). During the same year, they were joined by vocalist Robert Buljevič, but in 1990 he was replaced by keyboardist and vocalist Klaudio Krmac.

At the beginning of the 1990s, they turned towards commercial pop sound. In 1992, they celebrated their 25th anniversary with a concert in Izola and with the release of their second studio album, Tu je moj dom (My Home Is Here). During the same year, they won the first place on the Melodije morja in sunca (Melodies of the Sea and the Sun) with the song "E tristemente" (Italian for "And Sadly"). Their third studio album, Naj te morje... (May the Sea Bless You...), was released in 1994 and featured Oliver Dragojević as guest. In 1994, they won the first place at the Melodije morja in sunca with the song "Mi ljudje smo kot morje" ("We Humans Are Like the Sea"). After their following studio album, Stari časi (Old Times), released in 1995, Krmac left Faraoni and Ivančić returned to the group. He had in the meantime recorded a 7-inch single with the band Vivak, performed in Daniel's backing band and played with the bands Caravan, Bazaar and Casino Band.

In 1997, they marked their 30th anniversary with the live album V živo! (Live!), recorded in the San Simon resort in Izola. The recording of the concert was also released on video cassette. During the same year, they won the first place at the Melodije morja in sunca festival for the third time, with the song "Kar je res, je res" ("What's True Is True"), and were awarded the Zlatni petelin (Golden Rooster) award for the Best Slovenian Pop Group. Their following studio album, Solinar (Salt Pan), featured another guest appearance by Oliver Dragojević, in the song "Peškador". After Ferdinand Maraž died on 28 July 2003, keyboardist and accordionist Karlo Jaksetič joined the group. In 2007, they celebrated their 40th anniversary with a concert held in Izola on 21 August and with the release of the studio album Skupaj (Together). After the release of the album, the band officially ended their activity.

=== Post 2007 ===
Since the disbandment, the band had reunited on several occasions, for anniversary performances and concerts in larger venues. They celebrated their 45th anniversary with a series on concerts held during the summer of 2013.

Slavko Ivančić released three solo albums, Črta (The Line, 2000), Moja ljubezen (My Love, 2003), and Preberi me... (Read Me..., 2008). In 2009, he started a klapa group Solinar, with which he released the eponymous album in 2014. In July 2015, he had a car accident, after which he retired from performing.

== Legacy ==
Drago Mislej and Tomaž Feluga authored a book about the band, entitled Faraoni (1967–1992), published in 1992.

Slovenian trio Eroika covered the song "Solinar" for their 2007 album Eroika. Slovenian singer Alenka Godec covered the band's song "Ne bom pozabil na stare čase" ("I Won't Forget the Old Days") for her 2008 album So najlepše pesmi že napisane (The Most Beautiful Songs Have Already Been Written).

== Discography ==
=== Studio albums ===
- Faraoni (1988)
- Tu je moj dom (1992)
- Naj te morje... (1994)
- Stari časi (1995)
- Sem takšen, ker sem živ (1996)
- Kar tako (1999)
- Solinar (2002)
- Skupaj (2007)

=== Live albums ===
- V živo! (San Simon, 20. 8. 1997) (1997)

=== EPs ===
- Berač (1970)

=== Compilation albums ===
- Vol 1. (2004)
- Vol 2. (2014)

=== Video albums ===
- V živo! (1997)
