= Dado Topić =

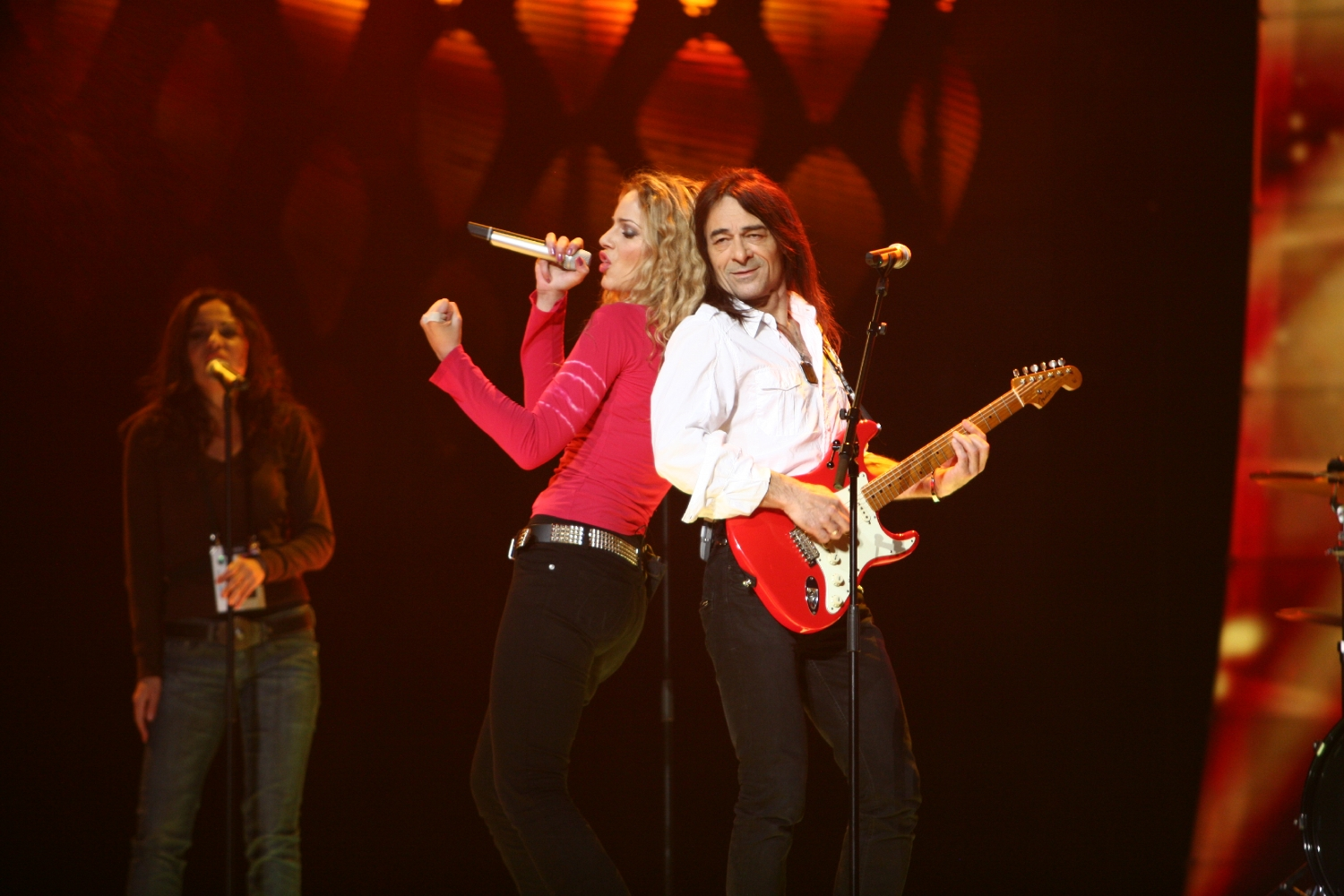
- Dragonfly and Dado Topić perform at Eurovision Song Contest 2007

Background information
- Born: Adolf Topić; 4 September 1949 (age 76); Siverić, PR Croatia, Yugoslavia
- Origin: Croatia
- Genres: Pop music, jazz, rap rock, pop rock, disco, hip hop, rock, funk rock, progressive rock
- Occupation: Singer
- Years active: 1969–present
- Formerly of: Dinamiti; Korni Grupa; Time

Adolf "Dado" Topić (born 4 September 1949) is a Croatian rock musician. He was the lead singer and founder of Time, a 1970s progressive rock band from the former Yugoslavia. From 1970 to late 1971, he was also the lead singer of the popular prog-rock band Korni Grupa (also known as The Kornelyans). He is a male vocalist who sang the entry from Croatia in the Eurovision Song Contest 2007, together with the band Dragonfly.

== Career ==
Topić has performed at Etnofest Neum twice: in 1997 with "Na te mislim" and in 2008 with "Nema prodaje".

He collaborated (singing and producing albums) with Smak.

== Discography ==
Studio albums

- Neosedlani (1979)
- Šaputanje na jastuku (1980)
- Otok u moru tišine (2001)
- Apsolutno sve (2004)

Live albums

- Live in Kerempuh (2008)

Compilation albums

- The Best Of (with Slađana Milošević, 1989)
- The Ultimate Collection (with Time, 2007)

Awards and achievements
Preceded by Severina with Moja štikla	Croatia in the Eurovision Song Contest (with Dragonfly); 2007	Succeeded by Kraljevi ulice & 75 Cents with Romanca
Preceded by Saša Vasić	Music Festival Budva winner (tied with Saša Matić); 2003	Succeeded by Marija Šerifović
Preceded by Nina Petković	Pjesma Mediterana winner (with Slađana Milošević); 2010	Succeeded by Event discontinued
Preceded by Kaliopi & Naum Peterski	Sunčane Skale winner (with Anita Popović); 2010	Succeeded by Qpid
